= Les Anges (TV series) =

French television series

- Created by: Alexann Bergeron
- Presented by: Fabrice Sopoglian (parrain saison 1 à 6, 8 à 12); Matthieu Delormeau (saisons 1 à 7); Ayem Nour (saisons 5, 8 & 9); Benjamin Cano (parrain saison 7); Aymeric Bonnery (saisons 10 & 11)
- No. of seasons: 12
- No. of episodes: 22 (season 1-2); 45 (season 3); 55 (season 4); 90 (season 5); 86 (season 6, 7, 10); 91 (season 8); 106 (season 9); 116 (season 11-12)

Production
- Running time: 45 min

Original release
- Network: NRJ 12
- Release: 10 January 2011 – 4 December 2020
- Network: TFX
- Release: 6 April 2026 – present

Les Anges, formerly Les Anges de la téléréalité (pronounced [lɛz‿ɑ̃ʒ də la teleʁealite], lit. 'The Angels of Reality TV'), is a reality television series broadcast on NRJ 12. In 2021, NRJ 12 announced that the series was canceled. In 2026, the series was revived on TFX.

== Summary ==
Season	Title	Broadcast period
1	Los Angeles	January / February 2011
2	Miami Dreams	May / June 2011
3	I Love New York	September / December 2011
4	Club Hawai	April / June 2012
5	Welcome to Florida	March / July 2013
6	Australia	March / July 2014
7	Latin America	March / July 2015
LVDA1	Les Vacances des Anges: All Stars	August / October 2015
8	Pacific Dream	February / June 2016
9	Back to Paradise	February / June 2017
LVDA2	Les Vacances des Anges 2: Bienvenue chez les Grecs !	August / November 2017
10	Let's Celebrate !	February / June 2018
LVDA3	Les Vacances des Anges 3: Viva España !	August / November 2018
11	Les Anges 11: En route pour l'Aventure	February / March 2019
12	Les Anges 12: Asian Dream	27 January / 2020

== Season 1: Los Angeles ==
Contestant	Real name	Formerly in	Objective
Astrid	Astrid Poubel	L'île de la tentation 2010	Become a model
Steevy	Steevy Boulay	Loft Story 2001	None (on holiday for a good time)
Marlène	Marlène Duval	Loft Story 2002	Become a singer
Senna	Senna Hounhanou	Secret Story 2010	Become a model
Amélie	Amélie Neten	Secret Story 2010	Become a model
Cindy	Cindy Sander	Nouvelle Star 2008	Become a singer in the US
John-David	John-David Dery	Secret Story 2008	Become a disc jockey
Diana	Diana Jones	L'île de la tentation 2001	Become a reality TV star

=== Guest stars ===
Romain Chavent, a former Secret Story 2009 contestant and former husband of Shauna Sand.

Senna and Amelie were in a relationship on Secret Story, but during their stay in L.A they parted.

=== Ratings ===
The show was a ratings success for NRJ 12. After a start with only 250,000 viewers to 17:50, the latest qutotidienne have attracted nearly 500,000 viewers on average.

== Season 2: Miami Dreams ==
Contestant	Real name	Formerly in	Objective
Loana	Loana Petrucciani	Loft Story 1 I'm a Celebrity 1	Regain fitness
Julie	Julie Ricci	Secret Story 4 France's Next top model 2	Become a model designer
Caroline	Caroline Receveur	Secret Story 2	Become a model and actress
Jonathan	Jonathan Cannarsa-Hirschberg	Secret Story 3	Work on movies
Daniela	Daniela Martins	Secret Story 3 Secret Story 2010 (Portugal)	Become an actress
Monia	Monia Righi	Popstar 2 former member Whatfor	Become a singer
Sofiane	Sofiane Tadjine-Lambert	Star Academy 4	Become a singer
Brandon	Brandon Yoko	L'île de la tentation 1	Become a yoga teacher
Marvin	Marvin Maarek	Génération Mannequin 4	Become a model

=== Guest stars ===
The first eight people of the L.A. season.

Diana and Brandon have been together for four years, before leaving the L'île de la tentation 2001 in separate.

Daniela and Jonathan have been a couple for Secret Story 2009, but Jonathan has broken with her for Sabrina, another candidate (Daniela already been eliminated during the break).

Julie and Amelie were friends at Secret Story 2010, but since Julie was in a relationship with Senna (Amelie's boyfriend, met in SS, and during the first season ofAngels) Amelie was hate. They are the enemy now.

=== Special guest stars ===
Actress, former Playboy model and a former contestant on Dancing with the Stars, Pamela Anderson, came into the house and gave advice to tenants (angels).

Rapper and former Celebrity and Ultimate Big Brother housemate, Coolio, comes to help and sings with Monia.

Singer Craig David.

== Season 3: I Love New York ==
Season 3 featured 10 Angels from reality TV and an anonymous/unknown "Angel".

Contestant	Real name	Formerly in	Objective
Carine	Carine Haddadou	Star Academy 2001–02	Become a singer
Matthieu	Matthieu Edwards	Star Academy 2007–08	Become a singer
Stéphanie	Stéphanie Clerbois	Secret Story 2010	Become a model and/or launch her own clothing brand
Mickaël	Mickaël Vendetta	La Ferme Célébrités 2010; Carré ViiiP 2011	Launch his own clothing brand
Émilie	Émilie NefNaf	Secret Story 2009	Open a hair salon
Myriam	Myriam Abel	Nouvelle Star 2003	Become a singer
Kamel	Kamel Djibaoui Saïch	Loft Story 2002	Become an actor
Kévin	Kévin Miranda	Dilemme 2010	Become an actor
Anaëlle		Poker : Mission Caraïbes 2009	Become a model
Benjamin	Benjamin Khalifa	L'île de la tentation 2007; Top Chef 2010	Become a chef
Guillaume	Guillaume Lemaire Van Kann	None	Become a wedding planner

=== Guest ===
- Keenan Cahill
- Clara Morgane
- Gilles Luka
- Lloyd Klein

=== Special Guest Star ===
Actress and former Dancing with the Stars 10 competitor Shannen Doherty.

== Season 4: Club Hawaii ==
In season 4, all twelve "Angels" worked at "Club Hawaï" ("Hawaii") to raise money for sick children. The charity was named "Le cœur des Anges". Catherine, the eldest "Angel", was in charge of fundraising and supervising other "Angels". All "Angels" lived in a house in Oahu. Throughout the season, some of them traveled to L.A. to attend go-sees and photo shoots as well as meet music producers and casting directors. Some "Angels" saw their dreams come true. Bruno had the opportunity to record a single and shoot a music video. Mohamed met professional dancers that helped him perfect his dancing. He also ended up being one of the dancers featured in Bruno's music video. Anthony trained Dennis Rodman. Aurélie met meteorologist Malika Dudley and flew to L.A. to interview Perez Hilton. She later came back to Honolulu to be a one-day TV correspondent for Hawaii News Now Sunrise. Nabilla traveled to L.A. to have the photo shoot of her dreams. Marie was offered a 3-year contract with Niche Talent in their life and style division and signed in a heartbeat.

Season 4 was one of the most controversial seasons, averaging 1–2 fights per episode. Marie and Geoffrey's relationship ended soon after their arrival in Hawaii, resulting in many arguments. Marie left the show before the end after finding out Geoffrey had had a tryst with Julia.

Contestant	Real name	Formerly in	Objective
Anthony	Anthony Amar	Koh-Lanta 2011	Become a sports coach Take care of the Hawaii Club
Myriam	Myriam Abel	Nouvelle Star 2003; Les Anges 3	Find a producer Take care of the Hawaii Club
Amélie	Amélie Neten	Secret Story 2010; Les Anges 1	Launch his brand of children's clothing Take care of the Hawaii Club
Bruno	Bruno Rua	Nouvelle Star 2006; Encore une chance 2012	Launch his career and record her single Take care of the Hawaii Club
Marie	Marie Garet	Secret Story 2011	Become an American brand muse Take care of the Hawaii Club
Geoffrey	Geoffrey Crousillat	Secret Story 2011	Sign in a modeling agency Take care of the Hawaii Club
Aurélie	Aurélie Van Daelen	Secret Story 2011	Become a TV host Take care of the Hawaii Club
Sofiane	Sofiane Tadjine-Lambert	Star Academy 2004; Les Anges 2	Register a new single Take care of the Hawaii Club
Julia	Julia Flabat	L'Île des vérités 2012	Sign in a modeling agency Take care of the Hawaii Club
Nabilla	Nabilla Benattia	L'amour est aveugle 2011	Become a model Take care of the Hawaii Club
Mohamed		None (Anonymous Angel)	Become a dancer Take care of the Hawaii Club
Catherine		Koh-Lanta 2006	Manage Club Hawaï

== Season 5: Welcome to Florida ==
Season 5 of the show was filmed in Fort Lauderdale, Florida.

List of candidates
Contestant	Real name	Formerly in	Objective
Amélie	Amélie Neten	Secret Story (season 4 – 2010); Les Anges 1 – 2011; Les Anges 4 – 2012	Promote her fashion label for babies (Baby H) and insure its marketing
Nabilla	Nabilla Benattia	L'amour est aveugle 2 – 2011; Les Anges 4 – 2012	To become a well-known model in the United States, to become an "It Girl"
Thomas	Thomas Vergara	Secret Story 6 – 2012	To become a model and a comic, to sign with an American agency
Benjamin	Benjamin Machet	La Belle et ses princes presque charmants 1 – 2012	Become a sports model and sign a contract with a known clothing trademark
Marie	Marie Parmentier	Koh-Lanta 12 – 2012	Become a home companion for VIPs
Capucine	Capucine Anav	Secret Story 6 – 2012	Become a face of an important cosmetic trademark
Alban	Alban Bartolli	The Voice: la plus belle voix (Season 1 – 2012	To record a single with a well-known producer
Samir	Samir Benzema	À la recherche du grand amour 1 – 2010; L'Île des vérités 2 – 2012	To represent a well known trademark and become a comic
Aurélie	Aurélie Dotremont	Carré ViiiP 1 – 2011; L'Île des vérités 2 – 2012	To become a consultant for a clothing and cosmetics trademark
Frédérique	Frédérique Brugiroux	Koh-Lanta 10 – 2010	Responsible for the charity operations of an association
Michael	Michael Essouong	None (Anonymous Angel)	Become a bodyguard for the stars
Maude	Maude Harcheb	None (Anonymous Angel)	To record a hit in the United States
Angel		Guard for the angels	None
Vanessa	Vanessa Lawrens	L'Île de la tentation 8 – 2010; Les Anges gardiens 1 – 2011	Sign for a modeling agency in the United States
Marie	Marie Garet	Secret Story 5 – 2011; Les Anges 4 – 2012)	To become an actress or a TV host presenter in the United States
Geoffrey	Geoffrey Crousillat	Secret Story 5 – 2011; Les Anges 4 – 2012	Sign with a modeling agency

=== Special Guest Stars ===
- Ayem (Ayem Nour) – from Secret Story 5 – 2011 and from Hollywood Girls 1 and 2 – Mission: To find Nabilla
- Kim (Kim Kardashian) from Dancing with the Stars (season 7 – 2008) – will make an appearance, coming into the house to give advice to tenants (angels).
- Dita (Dita von Teese) – will make an appearance, coming into the house to give advice to tenants (angels).
- Gilles Luka – Mission: To record a song for the tenants.
- Tracey Night (Tracey Hayden) makes appearances in three episodes as a vocal coach, singer and model.

== Season 6: Australia ==
Season 6 of the show is in Sydney and Melbourne.

List of candidates
Contestant	Real name	Formerly in	Objective
Amélie	Amélie Neten	Secret Story (season 4 – 2010 season 7 2013); Les Anges 1 – 2011; Les Anges 4 – 2012; Les Anges 5 – 2013	Responsible charitable mission
Benjamin	Benjamin Machet	La Belle et ses princes presque charmants 1 – 2012; Les Anges 5 – 2013	Model
Nelly	Nelly Chanteloup	La Belle et ses princes presque charmants 2 – 2013	Makeup artist
Anaïs	Anaïs Camizuli	Secret Story (season 7 – 2013)	Dancer
Eddy	Eddy Ben Youssef	Secret Story (season 7 – 2013)	Dancer
Julien	Julien Guirado	Secret Story (season 7 – 2013)	Footballer
Kelly	Kelly Helard	Les Ch'tis (seasons 1 to 3, 2011–2012)	Dancer
Shanna	Alicia Cres	Les Marseillais (seasons 1 & 2, 2012–2013)	Singer
Thibault	Thibault Garcia	Les Marseillais (seasons 1 & 2, 2012–2013)	Model
Julien	Julien Bert	L'Île des vérités 3 (season 3, 2013))	Footballer
Linda	Linda Youdif	Qui veut épouser mon fils? (season 2, 2012))	Housekeeper
Naïs	Naïs	None (Anonymous Angel)	Cooker
Dania	Dania Gio	None (Anonymous Angel)	Singer

== Season 7: Latin America ==
List of candidates
Contestant	Real name	Formerly in	Objective
Amélie	Amélie Neten	Secret Story (season 4 – 2010 season 7 2013); Les Anges 1 – 2011 – Les Anges 4 – 2012; Les Anges 5 – 2013; Les Anges 6 – 2014	Responsible charitable mission
Vivian	Vivian Grimigni	Secret Story 8	Comedian
Shanna	Alicia Cres	Les Marseillais 1 & 2 Les Anges 6	Dancer/Singer
Eddy	Eddy Ben Youssef	Secret Story (season 7 – 2013); Les Anges 6	Dancer
Thibault	Thibault Garcia	Les Marseillais 1 & 2 Les Anges 6	Model
Jon	Jon Ali	Nouvelle Star; The Voice 2	Singer
Barbara	Sarah Pombo	Nouvelle Star; Rising Star	Singer
Jessica	Jessica Da Silva	Secret Story 8	Footballer
Nathalie	Nathalie Andreani	Secret Story 8	Relooker
Coralie	Coralie Delmarcelle	La Belle et ses princes presque charmants 3	Model
Steven	Steven Bachelard	Qui veut épouser mon fils ? 3	DJ
Raphael	Raphael Pepin	L'île des vérités 3 Les Princes de l'Amour 2	Model
Maëva Karen	Maëva Karen Jolard	None (Anonymous Angel)	Singer
Somayeh	Somayeh Rashidi	None (Anonymous Angel)	Model
Micha	Micha Ionnikoff	Les Marseillais 3 Les Ch'tis VS Les Marseillais : Qui seront les meilleurs ?	confectioner

== Season 8: Pacific Dream (2016) ==
List of candidates
Contestant	Real name	Formerly in	Objective
Coralie	Coralie Porrovecchio	Secret Story (season 9) – 2015	Model
Melanie	Melanie Da Cruz	Secret Story (season 9) – 2015	Model
Nadège	Nadège Lacroix	Secret Story (season 6) – 2012; Friends Trip 2	Wedding Planner
Nicolas	Nicolas Nomal	Secret Story (season 9) – 2015; Friends Trip 2	Fighter
Sarah	Sarah Fraisou	Les princes de l'amour 2	XXL Model
Nikola	Nikola Lozina	Les princes de l'amour 3	Model
Nehuda	Lea Nehuda	The Voice 4	Singer
Jeff	Jeff Santiago	Koh Lanta Johor	Comedian
Jazz	Jazz Lanfranchi	Qui Veut Epouser Mon Fils 4 ?	Fighter
Ricardo	Ricardo Pinto	Friends Trip 1 & 2 La villa des coeurs brisés	Model
Andreane	Andreane Chamberland	None (Anonymous Angel)	Photographer
Dimitri	Dimitri Delavegas	None (Anonymous Angel)	Bodybuilder
Aurelie	Aurelie Preston	Les Marseillais 4	Singer

== Season 9: Back To Paradise ==
List of candidatesList of eliminated contestants
Contestant	Real name	Formerly in	Objective
Sarah	Sarah Lopez	Secret Story (season 10) – 2016	Model
Senna	Senna Hounhanou	Secret Story (season 4) – 2010; Les Anges 1 & 2	Model
Milla	Marie Charlotte Germain	Les princes de l'amour 3 Les Anges 8 Les Marseillais & Les Chtis vs le Reste du Monde	Comedian
Antho	Anthony Matéo	La belle et ses princes 3 Les princes de l'amour 2 La villa des coeurs brisés 2	Model
Melanie	Melanie Amar	La villa des coeurs brisés 2	Model
Jordan	Jordan Faelens	Les Chtis	Barber
Thomas	Thomas Adamandopoulos	Les Marseillais	Boxer
Rawell	Rawell Saiidii	Les Marseillais	Fashion Blogger
Vincent	Vincent Shogun	Les Chtis	Find Love
Frédérique Brugiroux	Frédérique Brugiroux	Les Anges 5 & 6	Housekeeper
Julien Bert	Julien Bert	Les Anges 6	Sportif coach
Sarah Fraisou	Sarah Fraisou	Les princes de l'amour 2 Les Anges 8	None
Emilie Amar	Emilie Amar	Friends Trip 2 & 3	None
Contestant	Real name	Formerly in	Objective
Giuseppe	Giuseppe Salamone	None (Anonymous Angel)	Footballer
Mickeal	Mickeal	Best Cook	Cook
Anissa	Anissa Jebbari	Moundir	Model
Evy	Evy Caysac	Les princes de l'amour 4	Dancer
Anthony	Anthony Alcaraz	None (Anonymous Angel)	Comedian
Haneia	Haneia Maurer	None (Anonymous Angel)	Comedian
Jonathan	Jonathan Zidane	Secret Story 9	Coach
Kim	Sophie Laune	Les Marseillais	Singer
Nesma	Nesma Lafhal	None (Anonymous Angel)	Model
Raphaël	Raphael Pépin	Les Anges 7 & 8	Barber
Luna	Luna Ginestet	The Voice 5	Singer
Alban Bartoli	Alban Bartoli	Les Anges 5	Singer
Carl	Carl Charron	The Game of Love	Model / Comedian
Barbara Lune	Sarah Pombo	Les Anges 7	Singer
Rania	Rania Saiidii	None (Anonymous Angel)	Fashion Blogger

== Season 10: Let's celebrate ==
List of candidates
Contestant	Real name	Formerly in	Objective
Barbara	Barbara Opsomer	Secret Story (Secret Story) – 2018	Singer
Florian	Florian Pagliara	Mariés au premier regard (Mariés au premier regard) – 2017	Real Estate Agent
Maddy	Maddy Burciaga	Les marseillais	Model
Remi	Remi Notta	Les Marseillais (Les Marseillais)	Personal Trainer
Manon	Manon Van	Les Marseillais (Les Marseillais)	
Adrien	Adrien Laurent	Friends Trip (Friends Trip)	Fitness Model
Sarah	Sarah Van Elst	The Voice 4 (The Voice 4)	Singer
Tristan	Tristan Defeuillet-Vang	Ninja Warrior (Ninja Warrior)	Stunt man
Claire	Claire Tomek	Friends Trip 4 (Friends Trip 4)	Model
Jordan	Jordan Gibky	Secret Story 11 (Secret Story 11)	Foodtruck
Amelie	Amelie Neten	Les Anges (Les Anges)	Charity
Vincent	Vincent Queijo	Les anges (Les anges)	Photographer
Shanna	Shanna Kress	Les anges (Les anges)	Music Video
Thomas	Thomas Adamandopoulos	Les anges (Les anges)	Boxer
Charles	Charles Theyssier	Secret story 11 (Secret Story 11)	
Sarah	Sarah Martins	Friends Trip 4 (Friends Trip 4)	News Anchor
Léana	Léana Zaoui	Les princes et princesses de l'amour (Les princes et princesses de l'amour)	Model
Jaja	Jawad Moussaoui	Les vacances des anges (Les vacances des anges)	Hair stylist
Raphael	Raphael Pepin	Les anges (Les anges)	Barber
Sarah	Sarah Fraisou	Les vacances des anges (Les vacances des anges)	
Emilie	Emilie Nef Naf	Les anges (Les anges)	
Steven	Steven Bachelard	Les anges (Les anges)	
Eddy	Eddy Ben Youssef	Les anges (Les anges)	
Astrid	Astrid Nelsia	Les vacances des anges (Les vacances des anges)	
Anais	Anais Camizouli	Les anges (Les anges)	

== Season 11: Back to Miami ==
List of candidates
Contestant	Real name	Formerly in	Objective
Aurelie	Aurélie Dotremont	Les anges 5	
Julien	Julien Guirado	Les anges 6	
Hillary	Hillary Vanderosieren	Les marseillais	
Thomas	Thomas Adamandopoulos	Les Marseillais )	
Stephanie	Stephanie Clerbois	Les anges 3 (	
Beverly	Beverly Bello	La villa des coeurs brisés (	
Raphael	Raphael Pepin	Les anges 7,8,9,10	
Vanessa	Vanessa Lawrens	Les anges 5 & 6 (	
Astrid	Astrid Nelsia	Friends Trip 4 (	
Marvin	Marvin Tillière	Secret Story 10	
Illan	Illan Castronovo	La villa des coeurs brisés ()	
Barbara	Barbara Opsomer	Les anges (Les anges)	
Tiffany		Koh Lanta 17 (Koh Lanta)	
Montaine	Montaine Mounet	Les Marseillais	
Jeremy	Jeremy Brun	Top Chef 5 (	
Jelena	Jelena Djinki	La villa des coeur brisés)	
Oceane		Beauty Match (	
Abel	Abel Marta	The voice 7 (	
Nicolo	Nicolò Ferrari	Riccanza	
Remi	Remi Notta	Les anges	
Pascal	Pascal Salviani	Les vacances des anges (	
Celine	Céline Morel	None (anonymous angel)	
Liyah	Liyah Dia	None (anonymous angel)	
Emy	Emy Buffa	None (anonymous angel)	
Kentin	Kentin Roges	None (anonymous angel)	
Benjamin	Benjamin Ulm	None (anonymous angel)	
Nathanya	Nathanya Sion	None (anonymous angel)	
Sephora	Sephora Goignan	None (anonymous angel)	
Mehdi	Mehdi Khchab	None (anonymous angel)	
Romain	Romain Reinaud	None (anonymous angel)	

== Les Vacances des Anges : All Stars ==
Name	Formerly in	Period	Place	Stats
Barbara Lune	Les Anges 7	Week 2 to week 8	–	
Benjamin Machet	Les Anges 5 & 6	Week 1 to week 8	–	
Eddy Ben Youssef	Les Anges 6 & 7	Week 1 to week 8	–	
Nathalie Andreani	Les Anges 7	Week 5 to week 8	–	
Shanna Kress	Les Anges 6 & 7	Week 1 to week 8	–	
Thibault Kuro Garcia	Les Anges 6 & 7	Week 1 to week 8	–	Stay
Vivain Grimigni	Les Anges 7	Week 6 to week 8	–	
Astrid Poubel	Les Anges 1	Week 7	08	Evicted
Guillaume Reydel	None (Anonymous Angel)	Week 5 to week 7	09	Evicted
Sofiane Tadjine	Les Anges 2, 3 & 4	Week 1 to week 6, week 8	10	Evicted
Samir Benzema	Les Anges 5	Week 6	11	Evicted
Amélie Neten	Les Anges 1, 2, 4, 5, 6 & 7	Week 1 to week 6	12	Walked
Diana Jones	Les Anges 1 & 2	Week 2 to week 5	13	Evicted
Caroline Van Hoye	None (Anonymous Angel)	Week 4 to week 5	14	Evicted
Raphaël Pépin	Les Anges 7	Week 4, week 7 to week 8	15	Evicted
Kamel Djibaoui	Les Anges 3	Week 1 to week 3, week 8	16	Evicted
Kevin Miranda	Les Anges 3	Week 3	17	Evicted
Myriam Abel	Les Anges 3 & 4	Week 1 to week 3	18	Evicted
Aurélie Dotremont	Les Anges 5	Week 2	19	Walked
Julien Bert	Les Anges 6	Week 2	20	Walked
Julie Ricci	Les Anges 2	Week 1	21	Evicted
Marie Garet	Les Anges 4 & 5	Week 1	22	Evicted

== Les Vacances des Anges 2: Bienvenue chez les Grecs ==
Name	Formerly in	Period	Place	Stats
Barbara Lune	Les Anges 7, 9 & LVDA	–	–	-
Carl Charron	Les Anges 9	–	–	-
Coralie Porrovecchio	Les Anges 8	–	–	-
Florian Paris	La Belle et ses princes presque charmants	–	–	-
Frédérique Brugiroux	Les Anges 5, 6, 9 & LVDA	–	–	-
Jawed "Jaja" Moussaoui	Secret Story 10	–	–	-
Kelly Helard	Les Anges 6	–	–	-
Neymar Abdelkader	Moundir et les apprentis aventuriers	–	–	-
Rania Saiidii	Les Anges 9	–	–	-
Sanaya Serra	None (Anonymous Angel)	–	–	-
Sarah Fraisou	Les Anges 8 & 9	–	–	-
Sarah Lopez	Les Anges 9	–	–	-
Thomas Adamandopoulos	Les Anges 9	–	–	-
Vincent Queijo	Les Anges 7 & 9	–	–	-
Vincent Shogun	Les Anges 9	–	–	-
Astrid Nelsia	La princes et princesses de l'amour 4	–	–	-
Florian Paris	La Belle et ses princes presque charmants	–	–	Walked
Raphael Pepin	Les Anges 9	–	–	Walked
Coralie Delmarcelle	Les Anges 7	–	–	Walked
Jonathan Zidane	Les Anges 9	–	–	Walked
Jordan Faelens	Les Anges 9	–	20	Walked
Mélanie Amar	Les Anges 9	–	20	Walked
Clément Castelli	Les Marseillais	–	–	Walked
Tony Teixeira	La villa des coeurs brisés	–	20	Walked
Rawell Saiidii	Les Anges 9	Week 1	21	Ejected
Amélie Neten	Les Anges 1, 2, 4, 5, 6, 7 & LVDA	Week 1	22	Ejected
Kim Glow	Les Anges 9	Week 1	23	Ejected
Florian Roche	Les Ch'tis et les Marseillais vs le Reste du Monde	Week 1	24	Walked

== Les Vacances des Anges 3: ¡ Viva España ! ==
Name	Formerly in	Period	Place	Stats
Raphael Pepin	Les Anges 7, 8, 9 & 10	–	–	-
Tressia Bertin	La villa des coeurs brisés	–	–	-
Bryan Dubois	Secret Story 11	–	–	-
Yamina Niya	10 couples parfaits	–	–	-
Remi Notta	Les Anges 10	–	–	-
Thomas Adamandopoulos	Les anges 9 & 10	–	–	-
Léana Zaoui	Les Anges 10	–	–	-
Yoann Boutonnet	10 couples parfaits 1	–	–	-
Sarah Fraisou	Les anges 8, 9 & 10	–	–	
Sarah Martins	Les Anges 10	–	–	-
Frédérique Brugiroux	Les Anges 5, 6 & 9	–	–	-
Florian Pagliara	Les Anges 10	–		-
Linda Dalin	La villa des coeurs Brisés	–	–	-
Jaja Moussaoui	Les anges 10	–		-
Barbara Opsomer	Les Anges 10			Walked
Corentin Albertini	Friends Trip 4	–	–	Walked
Sabrina Boot	Les Princes de l'amour	–	–	Walked
Elisa De Panicis	Supervivientes 14	–	–	Walked
Dominique-Damien Réhel	Friends Trip 4	–		Walked
Julie Robert	Secret Story 11	–	–	Walked
Zaven Aslanian	Les princes de l'amour 4	–	–	Walked
Pascal Salviani	Koh Lanta	–	–	Walked
Cassandre Lapierre	Secret Story 11	–	–	Walked
Marvyn Leone	Koh Lanta	–	–	Walked
Andréane Chamberland	Les anges 8	–	–	Walked

== Season 12 : Asian Dream ==
Jeremy

Anissa

Kevin

Virgil

Yumee

Illan

Vanessa

Sarah

Jonhatan

Cloé

Rémy (Leona Winter)

Sofiane

Angélique

Participants have formerly appeared in earlier season of the show or on other television reality shows as follows:

Former show	Season 1 Los Angeles	Season 2 Miami	Season 3 New York	Season 4 Hawaï	Season 5 Florida	Season 6 Australia	Season 7 Latin America	Season 8 Pacific Dream	Season 9 Back To Paradise	Season 10 Let's Celebrate	Season 11 Back to Miami	Season 12 ’’Asian dream
Loft Story	Steevy; Marlène	Loana	Kamel									
L'Île des vérités	Diana; Astrid	Our Brendon	Benjamin	Julia	Vanessa						Vanessa	
Star Academy		Sofiane	Carine; Matthieu	Sofiane (return of season 2)								
Koh-Lanta				Anthony; Catherine	Marie; Frédérique			Jeff	Frederique		Pascal; Tiffany	Angelique
Nouvelle Star	Cindy		Myriam	Myriam (return of season 3); Bruno		Sofiane	Barbara		Barbara			
Popstars		Monia										
Pekin Express											Oussama	Lydia
Beauty Match											Océane	Océane
Riccanza											Nicolo	
Secret Story	Amélie; Senna; John-David	Jonathan; Daniela; Caroline; Julie	Stéphanie; Émilie	Amélie (return of season 1); Aurélie; Geoffrey; Marie	Amélie (return of season 4); Geoffrey (return of season 4); Marie (return of season 4); Thomas; Capucine	Amélie; Anaïs; Eddy; Julien; Benoït	Vivian; Nathalie; Eddy; Jessica; Amelie; Vincent	Coralie; Nicolas; Melanie; Eddy; Nadège	Sarah; Thomas; Senna; Vincent	Jordan; Barbara; Amelie; Vincent; Charles; Jaja; Emilie; Eddy	Julien; Stephanie; Marvin; Barbara; Remi	
Je suis une célébrité, sortez-moi de là !		Loana (of Loft Story)							Loana (of Loft Story)			
La Ferme Celebrités			Mickaël									
Friends Trip							Julia	Ricardo; Nicolas	Emilie	Adrien; Claire; Charles; Sarah		
Les princes de l'amour							Raphael; Anaïs	Sarah Fraisou; Nikola; Milla; Raphael	Sarah Fraisou; Milla; Evy; Raphael	Sarah; Léana; Raphael; Fraisou; Astrid	Marvin; Astrid	
Génération Mannequin		Marvin				Christie						
Top Model		Julie (of Secret Story)										
La Maison du bluff		Caroline (of Secret Story)										
Poker : mission Caraïbes			Anaëlle									
Dilemme			Kévin									
Top Chef			Benjamin (of L’île de la tentation)			Latifa					Jeremy	
Le meilleur patissier									Mickaël			
Secret Story – Casa dos Segredos		Daniela (of Secret Story)										
Encore une chance				Bruno (of Nouvelle Star)								
L'île des vérités				Julia	Samir; Aurélie	Jeremstar; Julien			Julien		Aurélie; Beverly; Raphael	
Ninja Warrior										Tristan		
Mariès au premier regard										Florian		
The game of Love									Carl	Sarah		
La villa des coeurs brisés									Melanie; Antho	Raphael; Remi; Steven	Raphael; Remi; Illan; Jelena	
Allo Nabilla								Tarek				
Giuseppe Restorante								Amandine				
Les Chtis						Kelly			Jordan; Vincent		Hillary	
Qui veut epouser mon fils	P					Linda	Corinne; Steven; Linda	Jazz		Steven		
L'amour est aveugle				Nabilla	Nabilla (return of season 4)							
Celebrity Big Brother		Coolio (guest)		Dennis Rodman (guest)								
Dancing with the Stars		Pamela (Special guest)	Shannen (Special guest)		Kim (Special guest)							
The Celebrity Apprentice				Dennis Rodman (guest)								
La belle et ses princes presque charmants					Benjamin; Marc	Nelly	Coralie		Antho			
Moundir et les Apprentis Aventuriers									Evy; Anissa			Sarah
Les anges de la Teleréalité						Maude						Eddy sofiane
Les Marseillais /LMvsRDM						Shanna; Thibault	Shanna; Thibault; Micha	Aurélie	Kim; Thomas; Rawell	Shanna; Maddy; Remi; Manon; Thomas	Thomas; Montaine; Hillary; Remi	Cloe virgil Jonathan annisa illan
The Voice: la plus belle voix					Alban		Jon	Nehuda	Luna; Alban	Sarah	Abel	Remy”leona winter
Hollywood Girls					Ayem (of Secret Story) (special guest)							
None			Guillaume	Mohamed	Angel; Maude; Michael; Dita (special guest); Gilles Luka (special guest)	Dania; Naïs	Somayeh; Maëva Karen	Andréane; Dimitri	Haneia; Nesma; Anthony; Giuseppe; Rania; Ellen; Rawdolff; Laury; Apryl		Mehdi; Sephora; Romain; Kentin; Nathanya; Benjamin; Celine; Liyah; Emy	

== Discography ==
=== Albums ===
In 2013, an album was released titled Les anges de la téléréalité: Allô que des Hits appearing at No. 29 in France in its first week of release and rising to No. 37 the following week.

Year	Album	Peak positions	Notes
Year	Album	FR	Notes
2013	Les anges de la téléréalité: Allô que des Hits	27	
2013	Les anges de la téléréalité: Allô que des Hits 2014	–	

=== Singles ===
During Les Anges de la téléréalité 4, a number of singles were launched. A group named Les Anges: le Group was also formed made up of Myriam, Bruno, Julia and Mohamed. Bruno had the single "Be mine". Les Anges sang "Prêts pour danser".

During Les Anges de la téléréalité 5, the collective Les Anges sang "Ocean Drive Avenue". Participant Maude Harcheb whose task was to record a hit in the United States, had a big success with her solo effort "Love Is What You Make of It" (reaching number 3 in France and number 12 in Belgian Wallonia francophone charts)

Year	Single details	Peak positions	
Year	Single details	FR	BEL (Wa)
2012	"Be Mine": Credited to: Bruno Moneroe; Series: Les Anges de la téléréalité 4	64	–
2012	"Prêts pour danser": Credited to: Les Anges: le Group; Series: Les Anges de la téléréalité 4	–	–
2013	"Ocean Drive Avenue": Credited to: Les Anges; Series: Les Anges de la téléréalité 5	23	27 (Ultratip)
2013	"Love Is What You Make of It": Credited to: Maude (Maude Harcheb); Series: Les Anges de la téléréalité 5	3	12 (Ultratop)

== See also ==
- List of French television series

After this season, Angele, a candidate, filed a lawsuit against the production team for bullying. The show was permanently banned, as a consequence of the complaint deposited by Angele.
