= Secret Story season 4 =

Secret Story (season 4) or Secret Story 4 is the fourth season of various versions of television show Secret Story and may refer to:

- Secret Story (French season 4), the 2010 edition of the French version.
- Secret Story 4 (Portugal), the 2013 edition of the Portuguese version.
