= Nabilla Benattia =

French-Swiss model and TV personality (born 1992)

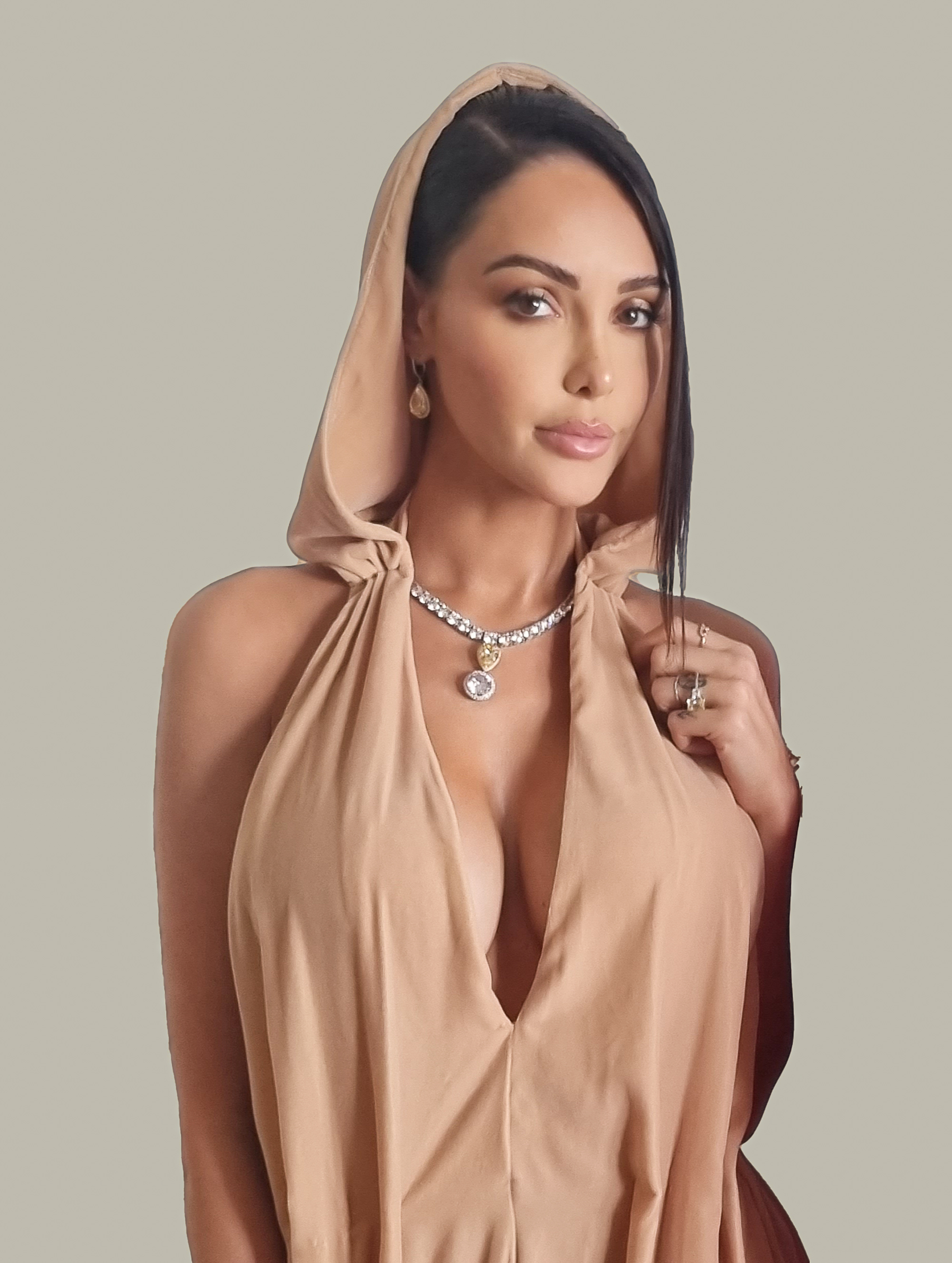
- Benattia at the Cannes Film Festival, 2023
- Born: Nabilla Leona Grange Benattia; February 5, 1992 (age 34); Ambilly, Rhône-Alpes, France
- Occupations: reality TV personality; model
- Years active: 2011–present
- Organization: NRJ 12
- Known for: Creating a media buzz in France with her catchphrase "non, mais allô quoi"
- Television: L'Amour est aveugle; Allô Nabilla : Ma famille en Californie; Les Anges de la télé-réalité; Hollywood Girls
- Spouse: Thomas Vergara (m. 2019)
- Children: 2
- Awards: Miss Salon de l'Auto 2011

Nabilla Leona Grange Benattia-Vergara (née Benattia; Italian: [naˈbilla leˈoːna ˈɡrand͡ʒe bɛnatˈtiːa], French: [nabila benatja]; born February 5, 1992), commonly known by her first name Nabilla, is a French-Algerian model and reality TV personality. She has appeared in L'Amour est aveugle (2009), Hollywood Girls (2012–2014), Les Anges de la télé-réalité (2012–2013) and her own TV show Allô Nabilla (2013–2014).

She became known in France for her one-liner "non, mais allô quoi?" ("I mean, like, hello?") on les Anges de la télé-réalité. The line was subsequently used in ads from brands such as IKEA and Carrefour. It gave rise to a number of parody videos viewed millions of times on YouTube, including a Downfall parody. She registered the phrase as a trademark at the Institut National de la Propriété Industrielle.

== Career ==
Nabilla was first hired by a modelling agency when she was 14 years old. Soon after, she was elected Miss Geneva International Motor Show 2011 while working on the Peugeot stand. At age 17, Benattia lied about her age to take part in the TF1's reality TV show L'Amour est aveugle (the French version of "love is blind"), where participants meet in total darkness.

Following her first appearance on TV, Benattia underwent breast enlargement surgery, which she claims was to further her career, enabling her to appear in publications such as Maxim and Playboy .

During 2012, she appeared in the fourth series of les Anges de la télé-réalité, shot in Hawaii. The programme, which airs on NRJ 12, follows a group of reality TV personalities for ten weeks. On the show she became romantically involved with Sofiane Tadjine-Lambert, who was in Star Academy 4. He wrote a song for her, "Dingue de toi (Nabi… Nabilla)", which reached number 25 in the French music charts.

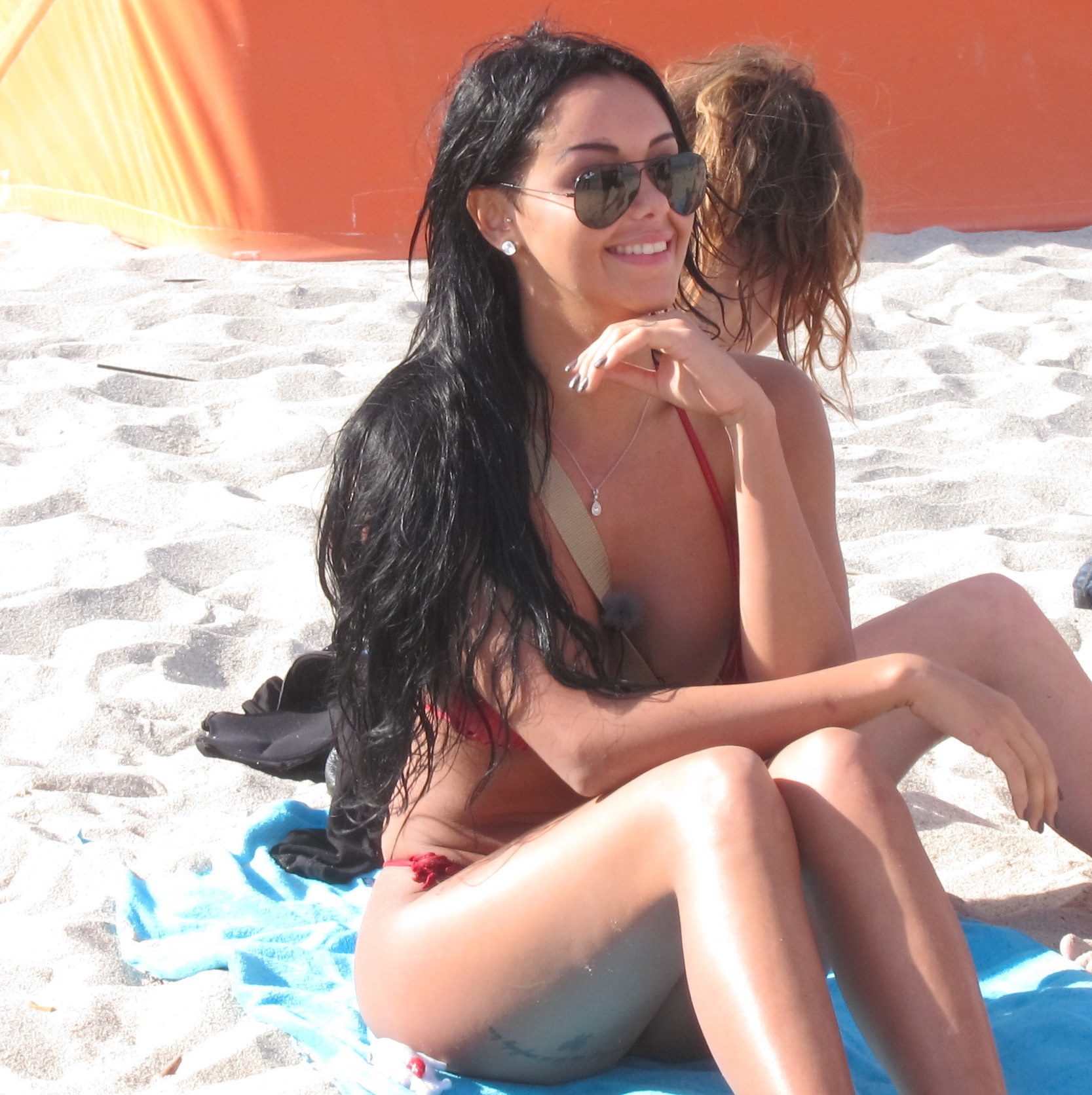
Nabilla at South Beach, January 2013

In early 2013, she finished filming on the fifth series in Florida. For her participation in this series, Benattia purportedly earned €25,000. In the fourth episode, after an argument with a fellow female castmember who said she had not bought shampoo, Benattia was shown in a confessional cutaway, where she mimed talking into a telephone and said the words which led to the establishment of her celebrity status:

"Euh, allô! non, mais allô, quoi. T'es une fille et t'as pas de shampooing ? Allô. Allô ! Je sais pas, moi, vous me recevez ? T'es une fille, t'as pas de shampooing ? C'est comme si je dis : t'es une fille, t'as pas de cheveux !" ("Er, hello! I mean, like, hello? You're a girl, you got no shampoo. Hello. Hello! I dunno, can you hear me? You're a girl, you got no shampoo? It's like if I said, 'you're a girl, you got no hair'.")

Nabilla's uttering caused a media buzz in France and generated many parodies, on the internet and in various media. La Grosse Équipe, the production company behind les Anges, registered four trademarks in mid-March with l'Institut national de la propriété industrielle, the French intellectual property registry. These were "Allô, quoi", "Allô, t'es une fille, t'as pas de shampooing, c'est comme si je dis, t'es une fille, t'as pas de cheveux", "Allô, non mais allô quoi", and "Allô, Nabilla la vraie vie de la famille Benattia". The last of these resulted in rumours discussed on Twitter that a new reality show was in the offing with her as the star. In a TV interview on the talkshow Grand journal, watched by 1.8 million viewers, Benattia confirmed that there will be a reality TV show following her day-to-day. La Grosse Équipe has also registered "Nabilla cherche l'amour" as a title for a TV show.

A fifth trademark "Nabilla allô t'es une fille t'as pas de shampooing c' est comme si t'es une fille t'as pas de cheveux" was registered by Benattia herself. The trademarks are registered across ten categories covering a wide range of products including scientific instruments, jewellery and linen but not shampoo.

In April 2013, a French Wikipedia article about her was deleted after a debate resulted in the decision that she lacked encyclopedic interest, being merely the object of a "buzz" instead of proper "information"; this decision on the French-language Wikipedia generated some media attention The page was redirected to that of Les Anges de la téléréalité.; in January 2014, it was ultimately recreated and kept after another debate, which concluded that her notability had proved sufficiently durable.

On 12 November 2013, her own TV Reality show started on NRJ 12. Called Allô Nabilla, ma famille en Californie (in reference to her famous line "Non mais allô quoi"), the show follows her and her family in Los Angeles. The show got mixed reviews. While the premiere's ratings were disappointing, the show performed ultimately well, and was renewed for three other seasons. In September 2014, she became a columnist for Touche pas à mon poste !, France's most popular talk show.

She is often referred as the "French Kim Kardashian" by TMZ.

In April 2016, she released an autobiographical book, Trop vite (Too fast).

In June 2018, conceptual artist Andy Picci unveiled a new body of work dedicated to Benattia. The exhibition at Joseph Saint Martin gallery consisted of a series of paintings by classic masters – including the Mona Lisa – on to which Picci has photoshopped Benattia's features.

== Personal life ==
Benattia was born in Ambilly, France. Her father is an Algerian and her mother Swiss Italian. She has been in a relationship with Thomas Vergara since January 2013.

In July 2009, Benattia was arrested for her part in a fraud alongside three Congolese individuals and sentenced to six months in prison. She used a stolen passport to open three bank accounts under a false identity. Meanwhile, her accomplices intercepted money transfers from public letter boxes and modified the bank account details to match the accounts Benattia had set up. She subsequently withdrew money from them. The victims were slow to take notice the theft because most of them were elderly people. According to the department of justice, approximately 200,000 Swiss francs were stolen. She was caught on CCTV in a branch of UBS Bank in January 2009 and was arrested at Geneva airport in July 2009, with the passport of her cousin, and used a false identity to the police. She spent a month in La Clairière youth detention centre for her part in the crimes.

On November 7, 2014, she was arrested and subsequently detained for several weeks after wounding her boyfriend Thomas Vergara in the chest with a knife during an argument. After keeping a low profile for several months, she made a media comeback in April 2016, by publishing her autobiography. On May 19, 2016, she was sentenced to six months in jail, but avoided returning behind bars thanks to the French system of penalty adjustments. She and Thomas Vergara reconciled before the trial.

In April 2019, Nabilla and her fiancé Thomas Vergara confirmed they were expecting their first child, and are planning to move to Dubai once it is born. They got married on May 1, 2019, in Paris, and gave birth to their son on October 11, 2019. They moved to Dubai a few months after their son's birth. On 5 June 2022, she gave birth to her second son.

== Filmography ==
| Year | Title | Role | Notes |
|---|---|---|---|
| 2007 | Turn Me Up | | Willy Denzey's music video |
| 2008 | À la Vie Éternellement | Unknown role | Swiss TV movie |
| 2011 | Dating in the Dark | Herself | Contestant, 8 episodes |
| 2012 | Les Anges 4 : Club Hawaï | Herself | Contestant, 55 episodes |
| 2012 | Dingue de toi | | Sofiane Tadjine's music video |
| 2012 | Le Mag | Herself | Chronicler |
| 2012 | Celebration | | The Game's music video |
| 2012–14 | Hollywood Girls | Nabilla Klein | Series regular, 106 episodes |
| 2013 | Les Anges 5 : Welcome To Florida | Herself | Contestant, 90 episodes |
| 2013 | Love Is What You Make Of It | | Maude Harcheb's music video |
| 2013 | Ocean Drive Avenue | | Les Anges 5's music video |
| 2013 | GirlZ | | Make The Girl Dance's music video |
| 2013–14 | Allô Nabilla | Herself | Main role, 34 episodes |
| 2014 | Les Anges 6 : Les Retrouvailles | Herself | |
| 2014 | Touche pas à mon poste ! | Herself | Chronicler |
| 2016 | Les Anges 8 : Pacific Dream | Herself | Cameo, 1 episode |
| 2017 | Orange Is the New Black | Nabilla | Guest |
| 2017 | Les Incroyables Aventures de Nabilla et Thomas en Australie | Herself | Lead role, 40 episodes |
| 2020 | Love Island France | Herself | Host, 26 episodes |
| 2023 | Cosmic Love France | Herself | Host, 20 episodes |
| 2025 | The Worst Witch News | Fenella Feverfew | Hors.13 episode |
