= Sofiane (singer) =

French singer

- Born: Sofiane Tadjine-Lambert; November 18, 1980 (age 45); France
- Genres: Pop
- Occupations: Singer, songwriter
- Years active: 2004 – present
- Label: EMI

Sofiane Tadjine-Lambert or just Sofiane Tadjine, better known by his simply Sofiane (born November 18, 1980) is a French singer and songwriter and a contestant in season 4 of French reality television music competition Star Academy in 2004 and in 2nd season of Les Anges de la télé-réalité in 2012.

== In Star Academy (2004) ==
He started singing and writing at an early age. In 2004, at 22 years old, he applied to the reality television show Star Academy in its fourth season reaching the Final 5 stage and eliminated after week 10 of a 12-week competition. The season was won by Grégory Lemarchal. Sofiane interpretations appeared in various season 4 album releases including "Je vais t'aimer" in duo with Francesca in Star Academy 4 chante Michel Sardou, "Mrs Robinson" in duo with winner Grégory in Star Academy 4 fait son cinéma and "Comme à l'ancienne" as a solo single in album Star Academy 4 : Les singles. "Comme à l'ancienne" became his debut single in 2004. He also took part in the Star Academy Tour with other finalist.

== Music career ==
After Star Academy, Sofiane began preparing songs for releasing an eventual album. He was encouraged by the success of his biggest hit in France "Briser mes chaînes". It was a song from the French adaptation of High School Musical in a French-language rendition of a song, composed by Jamie Houston. The French version with lyrics by Georges Costa, produced by Allias LJ and Xavier Pech and sung by Sofiane reached No. 10 on SNEP, the official French Singles Chart 2006, and stayed for 29 weeks in the French charts. It was also a hit in Belgium making it to No. 21 on Belgian Ultratop 50 francophone charts.

In 2007, he released his limited release album Comme je suis in collaboration with Alias LJ and Xavier Plèche with contributions by a wide prospect of artists like Bambi Cruz in "L'envie d'y croire" with hip hop influences, with Ygal Amar on the track "Elle" and N'Zongo Soul featuring in a fusion African music style. In the very personal album, Sofiane talks about his absent-father, talking about his Algerian origins, his mother to whom he was greatly attached, and about love such as on tracks. with funky-jazz style "Pour que tu reviennes", the dance tune "Danse pour moi". He also tackled racism and intolerance in "Je vous dis", indifference as in "L'envie d'y croire" and abandonment as in "Donne-moi".

He took part in High School Musical 3 that ran at the Rex in Paris starting September 2008.

== In Les Anges de la télé-réalité (2011 and 2012) ==
In 2011 and 2012, Sofiane has come back to reality television competition broadcast on French NRJ 12 television. The program gives a chance for participants in earlier reality television shows to achieve their own dreams through this new series.

Sofiane took part in series 2 with the announced aim of "releasing a hit single in the United States". This specific series was entitled Les Anges de la télé réalité 2 – Miami Dreams and included 9 finalists. The series was broadcast in May and June 2011. He was eliminated before reaching the finals. Loana Petrucciani won the series.

Sofiane also took part in series 4 with the declared aim of "recording a new single". This series was entitled Les Anges de la télé réalité 4 – Club Hawaï and it included 12 participants. The series was broadcast between April and June 2012. Sofiane became an immediate crowd favourite particularly because of his public flirtations with another contestant, the model Nabilla Benattia. During the program, he wrote a new song "Dingue de toi" with the catch phrase 'Nabi...Nabilla'. Although he was eliminated prior to reaching the finals, the song has proven to be a hit with the public and has charted in the official French Singles Chart

== Personal life ==
Sofiane was born in France to an Algerian father and a French mother. He grew up in a single mother environment with his father away. His father died in 2011.

== Discography ==
=== Albums ===
| Year | Album | Charts | Details |
| Year | Album | FRA | Details |
|---|---|---|---|
| 2007 | Comme je suis: Date released: June 25, 2007; Record label: EMI | 186 | Track listing: Comme je suis; 1. "Rêver" (3:23); 2. "Elle" (4:01); 3. "Je vous dis" (5:54); 4. "Briser mes chaînes" (3:26); 5. "Donne-moi" (3:30); 6. "Le mélange des couleurs..." (6:01); 7. "Pour que tu reviennes" (3:31); 8. "L'envie d'y croire (4:35); 9. "Pour ces femmes" (2:49); 10. "Danse pour moi" (3:29); 11. "Dis-moi pourquoi" (3:05); 12. "Dis-lui" (3:38); 13. "Deux âmes sœur" (3:50) |

=== Singles ===
| Year | Single | Charts | | Album | Music videos |
| Year | Single | FRA | BEL Wa | Album | Music videos |
|---|---|---|---|---|---|
| 2004 | "Comme à l'ancienne" | – | – | | |
| 2006 | "Briser mes chaînes" | 10 | 21 | Comme je suis | |
| 2011 | "It's OK, it's alright" | – | – | Non-album release | |
| 2012 | "Dingue de toi (Nabi...Nabilla)" | 25 | – | Non-album release | |

== Videography ==
- 2006: "Briser mes chaînes"
- 2009: "Rêver"
- 2012: "Dingue de toi (Nabi...Nabilla)"
- 2015: "Yoyo" (Ooh Ooh)
