= Secret Story 1 (Portuguese season) =

- Season 1
- Presented by: Júlia Pinheiro
- No. of days: 90
- No. of housemates: 17
- Winner: António Queirós
- Runner-up: Ana Isabel

Release
- Original network: TVI
- Original release: 3 October – 31 December 2010

Season chronology
- Next → Season 2

Secret Story - Casa dos Segredos 1 was the first season of the Portuguese version of the reality show Secret Story, based on the French version of Secret Story, which itself is based on the international format, Big Brother. The series started on October 3, 2010, and the finale, which took place in Campo Pequeno, Lisbon, was on December 31. The show aired on TVI and was produced by Endemol Portugal. The show lasted three months and was hosted by Júlia Pinheiro, Pedro Granger, and Leonor Poeiras.

The eviction shows (also called Galas) took place on Sundays and a daily diary of what happened in the house was broadcast on the other days of the week. Both were on in prime time. Also, a sister show called Secret Story Extra, airing in a late-nighttime slot, showed more of the events that took place in the house. On the TVI Direct cable TV channel, the show was broadcast 24/7. Since November 15, another hour of Secret Story began to be broadcast in the late afternoon, therefore making three programmes per day plus a 24/7 channel. In that space, since Week 8, the public could vote for secret missions that housemates would make. On Saturdays, only one show aired a special one with the best moments of the week called "Secret Story Fim-de-Semana" (Secret Story Weekend). A special CD was made with the theme song and housemates' favourite songs.

The format is based on the French one, although the Portuguese version has more secret missions. These missions were imposed by "a Voz" ('The Voice'), which served a similar function to "The Voice" in the previous series. If a housemate discovered another housemate's secret, he or she would win that housemate's prize money. The money prizes for each mission were different; only the four finalists received their account money. Nominations followed the standard Big Brother format, although, in this series, nominations alternated weekly, boys one week and girls the next. Only two housemates could be up for eviction in each round. If there was a tie in the nominations, a second-round was held in which only the tied housemates could be nominated. As the series progressed, housemates developed friendships, dividing into two groups, Boi Marinho and Toupeira, although at the end of Week 8, when Vítor was expelled, all the housemates became closer.

== Housemates ==
=== Ana Isabel ===
Ana Isabel Ribeiros was 26 years old when the series began and lives in Guimarães. Her secret was that she was in a relationship with Vítor. She found Mário and Renato's secret on day 2. Hugo F. told Ana Isabel he knew her secret in week 2 but didn't have the courage or money to reveal it. She confirmed that was her secret. Consequently, "A Voz" withdrew her money and gave her the task of pretending that Hugo F. he was wrong. Subsequently, they became very close friends in the House. On day 25, Renato discovered her secret. She was the runner-up of "Secret Story-Casa dos Segredos" season 1.

=== Andreia ===
Andreia Leal was 37 years old when the show began and lives in Porto. Her secret is "I worked as an escort", and Ivo discovered it on day 66. She was considered one of the best players and bluffers inside the House. She was a member of the Toupeira group and was a friend of Hugo F., Ana Isabel and Ivo. She was evicted from the House on day 77, with 55% of the votes against Ana Isabel.

=== António ===
Antonio Queirós was 28 years old and lives in Portugal. His secret is that he owned a brothel, but appeared innocent and religious, so nobody suspected his secret. He developed a crush on Vera during the show, although she never reciprocated. Ivo and Antonio discovered one another's secret, although Antonio's was the last one to be discovered by the housemates.

=== Catarina ===
Catarina was 20 and lives in Rio Tinto. Her secret was that she is the accomplice of "A Voz". She had a very difficult life before Secret Story and people thought her secret was related to that. She belongs to the "Toupeira" group. Catarina was evicted on Day 49 with 37% of the public votes and was up against Joana and Andreia.

=== Daniela ===
Daniela Martins was 23. She was born on the region of Trás-os-Montes but she lived in Luxembourg since the age of five. She was on the third season of Secret Story in France, where she was evicted on Day 7. Her secret was that she spent nine years in a convent. She had a romance with Vasco and a very close friendship with Vera. She was evicted on Day 21 with 62% of the votes and was pitted against Ana Isabel.

In May 2011, she participated in the second season of Les Anges de la télé-réalité, which was set in Miami. In this game, there were eight other former candidates for reality TV, including Jonathan, her former boyfriend of Secret Story 3 in France.

=== Doriana ===
Doriana was 20 and lives in Porto Santo. Her secret was "I posed nude for a magazine." She appeared shy on the show, but she mentioned she acted that way so that her boyfriend (in the real world) would still love her. She was evicted on Day 7 against Joana, with 68% of the votes.

=== Hugo F. ===
Hugo Felgueiras was 26 and lives in Porto. He made numerous attempts to discover secrets, and he discovered a few first but other participants revealed their correct guesses before his. He belonged to the "Toupeira" group and had a very close friendship with Ana Isabel. Hugo F. was considered humble, funny and a "Don Juan". He was evicted on Day 70 with 46% of the public vote, against António and Ivo.

=== Hugo M. ===
Hugo Marques was 23 and lives in Lisbon. He shared a secret with Joana: "We are a fake couple." Their secret was discovered on Day 18 by Jade, but both decided to continue the relationship. He belonged to the "Boi Marinho" group and people had doubts about his feelings for Joana. On Day 42 he was evicted with 53%, against Zé Miguel and António.

=== Ivo ===
Ivo was 31 and lives in Lisbon. His secret was "I have an obsessive-compulsive disorder", which was discovered by António on Day 80. He finished in fourth place.

=== Jade ===
Jade Carpinteiro was 22. She lived in France but moved to Coimbra. Her secret was that when she lived in France, she participated in a car robbery with her boyfriend. She discovered Hugo M. and Joana's secret on Day 18. She belonged to the Toupeira Group and was described as funny. She was evicted on Day 35 with 56% of the public vote, against Ana Isabel.

=== Joana ===
Joana Janeiro was 23 and lives in Lisbon. She shared a secret Hugo M.: "We are a fake couple." Their secret was discovered on day 18 by Jade, but they decided to continue the relationship. In the beginning, Joana said that she would act in the house, as her dream is to be an actress. She was closer to the "Boi Marinho" group. Although at first, she intended to "declare war" on Ana Isabel, after Vítor's ejection all the housemates became closer, and the two developed a friendship. She was evicted on Day 63 with 54% of the votes, against Ana Isabel.

=== Mário ===
Mário Lima is 26, lives in Pontinha and his secret is that he is Renato's twin brother. He lived in a secret room for one week and switched positions with Renato. If the substitution was not discovered until the end of Day 2, they will continue in the house. Their secret was discovered on Day 2 by Ana Isabel. Mario was evicted on Day 4 with 27%, against his brother.

=== Renato ===
Renato Lima was 26 years old and lives in Pontinha. He entered the house on 3 / 10. His secret is that he was Mario's twin brother, which was discovered on day 2 by Ana Isabel. On day 25, he discovered the secret of Ana Isabel and Victor. He was in the group "Boi Marinho." He was sent off in 28 days, with 73% of the vote, against 27% for Victor.

=== Vasco ===
Vasco Oliveira was 28 and lives in Porto. His secret is that he is the son of a public figure, António Luís Alves Ribeiro Oliveira. He had a strong friendship with Vera and Daniela which he called "O triângulo" (The Triangle). In his final days in the house, he had a relationship with Daniela. He was the creator of the "Boi Marinho Group". Vasco was evicted on Day 14 with 69% of the votes, against Vítor.

=== Vera ===
Vera was 21 and lives in Sintra. She told her secret to other housemates on Day 22, without revealing it was hers, but still, she was punished by losing all her account money. Her secret was that she had an affair with a famous Portuguese football player (Ruben Amorim). Vera is the only housemate who has never been nominated. Vera got third place.

=== Vítor ===
Vítor Rangel was 37 and lives in Porto. His secret was that he is in a relationship with Ana Isabel. Hugo F. revealed to Ana Isabel on Day 8 that he already knew her and Vítor's secret, but he couldn't click on the "Button of Secrets" since he was short €300. Their secret was discovered on Day 25 by Renato. For most of the series, people were asking if he and Ana Isabel still dated. He was closer to the "Toupeira" group and he had the so-called "most difficult secret mission" where he had to go to a secret room and the others had to believe he walked. It was there that the secret of his relationship with Ana Isabel was revealed; however, he was ejected on Day 54 because he exhibited disrespect for Hugo F. and Ana Isabel and aggression when he was drunk during a party.

=== Zé Miguel ===
Zé Miguel Fernandes was 34 and lives in Irivo. He belonged to the "Boi Marinho" group and had a crush on Ana Isabel. Many of the other housemates thought his secret was that he was bisexual or homosexual. He was evicted on Day 56 with 62% of the public vote, against Hugo F.

== Secrets ==
There are 14 secrets in the House for this first season.

| Secret | Person | Discovered by | Discovered in: |
|---|---|---|---|
| I'm the son of a celebrity | Vasco | Not discovered | |
| I had an affair with a famous Portuguese football player | Vera | Andreia^{2} | Day 65 |
| I spent nine years in a convent | Daniela | Not discovered | |
| We are a fake couple | Hugo M. and Joana | Jade^{1} | Day 18 |
| I'm the accomplice of "The Voice" ("A Voz") | Catarina | Hugo F. | Day 46 |
| We are a real couple | Ana Isabel and Vítor | Renato | Day 25 |
| I have an obsessive-compulsive disorder | Ivo | António | Day 80 |
| I was the owner of a brothel | António | Ivo | Day 82 |
| I had a paranormal experience | Hugo F. | Not discovered | |
| I posed nude for a magazine | Doriana | Not discovered | |
| I have a twin brother in the house | Mário and Renato | Ana Isabel | Day 2 |
| I was in more than 250 relationships | Zé Miguel | Not discovered | |
| I worked as an escort | Andreia | Ivo | Day 66 |
| I participated in a robbery | Jade | Not discovered | |

- Note 1: Even though their secret was discovered, both agreed to continue the relationship.
- Note 2: Vera revealed her secret to other housemates on Day 22, without saying that it is her secret.

== Weekly Summary ==
=== Week 1 (October 3rd to October 10th) ===
Entrances: All the housemates entered the House on Day 1.

Secret Missions, Tasks & Accounts: Mário and Renato are twin brothers. While one is open in the house, the other is hidden in a secret room, and they periodically switch places, both going by the name Renato. If the masquerade is successful until Day 2, both of them will stay in the house. If they fail, they will be nominated for eviction. Hugo F. has a mission to wear unusual clothing and convince the other housemates they are his actual clothes. If he succeeds, he will win €1000. If they find out, he will lose €1000. He passed the task. On Day 1, "a Voz" gave Jade a secret mission: pretend that she likes Vítor, whose secret is that Ana Isabel is his girlfriend. "A Voz" assigned the whole group the task of saying who they liked and who they didn't, which revealed the least popular person in the house was Renato—at the time, the other housemates didn't know about the twins—and that Andreia was the most popular member in the house. "A Voz" took €500 away from all of the housemates because they jumped to the pool with the microphones.

Secrets: Ana Isabel discovered Mário's and Renato's secret, and all their money was transferred to her account. Hugo F. tried to discover António's secret on Day 1 but failed, and therefore half of his account money went to António. On Day 2, António thought that the twins were triplets and pressed the secrets button. As that wasn't true, half of his money went to the twins' account. Doriana pressed the secret button saying that António's secret is that he is a witch. Her answer was not right and half of her account went to António. Vasco's secret was officially revealed one during the eviction show.

Nominations: Mário and Renato were automatically up for eviction since Ana Isabel discovered their secret on Day 2. On Day 4, Joana and Doriana were the most nominated housemates with 5 and 3 votes respectively and were also up for eviction.

Exits: Mário was evicted on Day 4 with 28% to save. Doriana was evicted on Day 7 with 68% to evict.

=== Week 2 (October 11th to October 17th) ===
Secret Missions, Tasks & Account: Zé Miguel had to steal Jade's Yoda doll—a McDonald's Happy Meal toy similar to a Magic Eight Ball)--and incriminate Ivo. He failed and lost €500. "A Voz" gave all the housemates a task: answer questions about other housemates. Since only 3 of 15 answers were correct, all the housemates lost €1000. Some housemates got missions. António had to convince the other housemates that his first love was for a sheep. Daniela had to pretend that she is interested in Vasco. She passed the task and therefore she won some hours alone with Vasco in a secret room. Hugo M. had to teach António how to swim in 48 hours. He failed and lost €1000. All the housemates had a task: catch 3 roosters in the living room, alluding to tic-tac-toe which is called "Jogo dos galos" (The rooster's game) in Portugal. There was a dance competition in which the male and female winner would get €300 to their account. Joana and Renato won the game and both won €300.

Secrets: Hugo F. tried to discover Ana and Vítor's secret but he didn't have enough money to do so. He then confronted Ana Isabel and she confirmed her secret. Thanks to that, she lost all her money - €9100 - and went from the richest member in the house to the poorest. Andreia won €100 for passing a task. Vítor tried to discover Vera's secret by saying that he thought she is an ex-alcoholic. Since that is not her secret, he lost half of his money to her. Vasco thought that Ana Isabel's secret was that she lived 9 years in a convent. He lost half of his money to Ana Isabel. In a strategic move, Hugo M. pretended to discover Joana's secret, claiming that she is the accomplice of "a Voz". Therefore, he lost half of his money to Joana. Doriana's and Catarina's secret was the one officially revealed during the eviction show.

Nominations: Vasco and Vítor were both up for eviction with 3 nominations each.

Exits: Vasco was evicted on Day 14 with 69% of the votes.

=== Week 3 (October 18th to October 24th) ===
Secret Missions & Tasks: As accomplice of "a Voz", Catarina has to make a housemate or housemates of her choice believe that Hugo F. is the accomplice strongly enough that they will click on the "Button of Secrets". She revealed her mission to Jade and therefore lost all her money. Also, she has to steal cigarettes every day til "a Voz" tells her to stop. As a task given on Day 15, but which continued through the whole week, all the housemates had to become "masters". They all would get an individual mission to perform with the other housemates. As they passed, they would win €500. Then a "Master of the Masters" would get €1000, which Renato won. For this week's shopping mission, housemates had to cross the pool as many times as they could. Each time they crossed, they won sometime in the storage room to take as much food as they could. They won 2m20s. On Day 17, all the housemates had to play a game in which they shared their true feelings about the other housemates. The most sincere housemate would win €1000. Renato and Hugo M. had a mission on Day 18 to make a special dinner for the other without being discovered. Vera had a mission to make António believe that she's in love with him. She will win €500 if she passes. On Day 19, all the housemates lost half of their money for two reasons. Some people threw tennis balls to the garden with information about Ana and Vitor's secret. Daniela and Andreia grabbed the balls and read it to most of the people. The other reason is that everyone keeps talking about secrets with each other, but these secrets have to be discovered by clicking in the Button of Secrets.

Accounts & Secrets: Jade discovered Joana and Hugo M.'s secret and all their account money was transferred to Jade's account. Ivo and Hugo F. won €50 for answering correctly a question on the phone. Andreia's secret was officially revealed one during the eviction show.

Nominations: Ana Isabel and Daniela both received 3 nominations and were up for eviction.

Exits: Daniela was evicted on Day 21 with 62% of the public vote.

=== Week 4 (October 25th to October 31st) ===
Secret missions, Tasks & Accounts: On Day 22, all the housemates began a group challenge of remaining 50 hours on a stationary bike. There were two lights, red and white, and the light had to stay white. If the light went red during a participant's turn, he/she would lose €200. The participants who passed would win €200 and if the mission is passed as a group, everyone would get massage kits. Jade and Hugo F. have to convince the others they are in love. They won €500. They made a deal with "a Voz". During the first weeks, the other housemates believe that Hugo F. and Andreia's secret is that they were in a relationship. He has to make the others believe in that once again. Andreia had a secret mission to convince the others she is in love with Renato. She failed and lost €500. For the shopping task, to earn time in the storeroom for food, several personalities were displayed on the living room television. For each person the housemates remembered afterwards, they would earn time in the storeroom. They won 3 minutes. Hugo M. had a mission on Day 25 to teach everyone a gym class at 14:00 according to the yellow clock (several clocks, all wrong, were on one wall of the house). He failed and received a punishment: he lost €200 while everyone else won €300. On Day 26, the housemates were divided into two groups: men and women. The women had to replicate Jade's Yoda doll in clay, while the men's group had to make a clay model of a Porsche; the women won. António had a mission to make the biggest number of housemates laugh. He failed and lost €300.

Secrets: Vera told the housemates her secret, without revealing whose it was and lost her account money as a result. Renato discovered Vítor and Ana Isabel's secret on Day 25 and so all their money was transferred into his account. Daniela and António's secret were revealed during the eviction show.

Nominations: On Day 22 the phone rang. Ivo was the first to answer the phone and therefore immunized himself from being nominated this week. In Day 23 the nominations took place. Hugo F., Renato and Vítor were. As in the Portuguese rules, only two housemates can be up, the girls had to nominate for a second round, but they could only nominate one of the three tied housemates. Renato and Vítor both received three nominations in the second round and were nominated for eviction.

Exits: Renato was evicted on Day 28 with 73% of the public vote to evict.

Other: On Day 23, two cats entered the house. They were named Woody and Rute.

=== Week 5 (November 1st to November 7th) ===
Secret missions, Tasks & Accounts: All the housemates had to make puppets of other housemates during the week, and in the final episode of the week they created a sketch with them. To celebrate Halloween, the housemates had to make a character in a pumpkin. This task began in the 4th week but concluded on Day 29. Ana Isabel won the task and received €600. On Day 30 the girls took part in a beauty pageant, and the boys had to decide the winner. They chose Catarina. She won beauty products. Zé Miguel had to make the other housemates believe his secret is that his IQ is above normal. To win time to take food from the storage room, they had a shooting game. They won 1min and 58sec. The group had a mission to peel vegetables, divided into three turns. Everyone passed the mission and therefore won €1000. Catarina had to make Ivo nervous. She had to hide his glasses and hat and also put hair in his bed. On Day 33. António had a mission to make Ivo and Hugo F. mad. He passed and won €2000. A letter was put in the garden. As Zé Miguel was the first to see it, he won €1000. The housemates played a game of Bingo. Vera was the winner, for €6000, and Ivo and Hugo F. won €1000 as runner-ups. Zé Miguel had a mission to convince the other to take part in a Portuguese folk dance class. He won €2000.

Secrets: On Day 31, as a strategic move, Jade tried to discover Hugo F.'s secret: She says that she is practically sure that she will be evicted against Ana Isabel, and, even if the secret isn't right, she would give all her money to someone instead of being evicted with her money. She said that Hugo F. took part in a solidarity mission in Afghanistan. As that is not Hugo F. secret, half of her money Jade's money went to Hufo F. tried to discover Ivo's secret: He said that he is the accomplice of "a Voz". As that's not Ivo's secret, half of his money went to Ivo. On Day 33 António tried to discover Jade, Hugo F. and Ivo's secret (he said that they all had a shared secret). He said that Hufo F. is Jade's brother and that Ivo is Jade's boyfriend. He lost half of his money to all of them. Zé Miguel tried to discover Catarina's secret, claiming she was bisexual; that was not her secret, and he lost half of his money to Catarina. Ivo's secret was the one revealed during the eviction show.

Nominations: The phone rang on Day 29, and as Andreia was the first to answer it she won immunization for the week. On Day 30 the nominations took place. Jade received 4 nominations and Ana Isabel 3.

Exits:Jade was evicted on Day 35 with 56% of the public vote.

=== Week 6 (November 8th to November 14th) ===
Secret missions, Tasks & Accounts: Andreia had a mission to ask Zé Miguel and António some questions. She partially passed and won €500. Vera had a mission to teach a hip hop class to other housemates and won €2000. She also chose Joana as the worst student and Joana lost €800. "A Voz" gave Ana Isabel a mission to keep all the housemates indoors for 1 hour. However, a few minutes later, "a Voz" also gave Vera a mission to keep all the housemates in the garden for one hour. Ana Isabel kept everyone in the kitchen and won €500, while Vera lost €500. Hugo F. and Ana Isabel won €500 for answering the phone at the 3rd ring.

The housemates have to jump through a circle in turn without touching the circle. The faster they do that, the bigger the prize of time in the storage room will be. They've won 3m10s. Hugo M., António and Vítor had a mission to be the "chef" of the day. They passed and won €1000. All the housemates had a task to plant some flowers in the garden and tell a story about them. The winner would receive €2000. Ivo won, but declined the prize, and divided the money with the other housemates. The housemates had to label all the objects in the house with a time limit. They passed. The housemates had a mission to learn how to dance Tango. Even though this was optional, all the housemates took part.

Secrets: On Day 36, Hugo F. said that Antonio's secret was that he was a virgin and intended to remain that way until marriage. Half of his money went to António. On day 37, Andreia tried to discover António's secret and said that António wants to find his wife inside the house. Half of her money went to António. Also on Day 38, Zé Miguel clicked the Button of Secrets saying that Hugo F.'s secret is that he thinks that he is the perfect man; half of his money went to Zé Miguel. Vítor also tried to discover António's secret. He said that the secret is that António wants to marry inside the house, and so half of his money went to António. Hugo M. also tried to discover Hugo F.'s secret, saying he is a "Don Juan"; half of Hugo M.'s money went to Hugo F. Jade's secret was the one officially revealed during the eviction show. Catarina said that Zé Miguel's secret is that he is a "Don Juan". Half of her money went to Zé Miguel.

Nominations: On Day 37, Hugo M. was automatically nominated for "a Voz" by breaking the rules of the game. On the nominations, Zé Miguel and António received three nominations. So, all three were up for eviction.

Exits: Hugo M. was evicted on Day 42 with 53% of the public vote.

=== Week 7 (November 15th to November 21st) ===
Secret missions, Tasks & Accounts:Vera and António had a shared mission. Vítor had to criticise the food of the day. His mission was discovered by Ana Isabel and therefore he failed. The housemates had a task to tell some jokes. Joana and Zé Miguel won €500. When a song played, they had to go to a wooden horse and neigh. The housemates had to pair up and do comedy sketches. Ana Isabel had to put on a wedding dress and throw bouquets to the men. As all the bouquets were caught, she won €3500. On Day 46, Vítor had to pretend he walked and is now watching everyone from a secret room. He passed the task and won not only €5000 as also he spent an entire night with Ana Isabel alone in the secret room. Housemates had a resistance task called "walk over water". Joana was the female winner and António was the male winner. They won a special prize. A henhouse with a chicken was put in the garden. The three nominees had to dress a kitchen suit and always that the chicken stepped on a little target in the floor, they had to say a sentence about chickens.

Secrets: On Day 43 Vera tried to discover Catarina's secret. She said that Catarina was sexually abused. Ivo tried to discover Hugo F.'s secret, that he was Ana's boyfriend. Ana Isabel also tried António's secret, that he can predict the future. All were wrong. On Day 46, Zé Miguel tried to discover Catarina's secret. He said that she is homosexual. That's not her secret. Later on that day, Hugo F. discovered Catarina's secret and won all her money. Vera's secret was the one officially revealed.

Nominations: Andreia received four votes, while Joana, Ana Isabel and Catarina received 2 votes. Therefore, Andreia was up and the other three had to go to a 2nd round. In that round, Joana and Catarina received two votes, and both were up for eviction.

Exits: Catarina was evicted on Day 49 with 37% of the public vote.

=== Week 8 (November 22 – November 28) ===
Secret missions, Tasks, & Accounts: Hugo F. has a mission to pretend that he has hallucinations for four days, during which he will discuss secrets. This week is the get healthy week; housemates will win money for every kilogram lost. For the storage task, housemates will write "Secret Story" with some dominoes; the larger the number of pieces that stay up, the more time they win. Ivo had a mission to get close to five persons for more than 5 minutes. He passed and won a dinner with the five persons. All the housemates had a task to tell what they most like about themselves and other persons and also whom they should live with in the exterior. Andreia and António won €500.

Nominations: In the first round, Hugo F. received 3 votes, but as Vítor and Zé Miguel tied in second place with 2 votes, there was a second round. In that second round, Vítor and Zé Miguel tied again with 2 votes and therefore were both up with Hugo F.

Exits: Vitor was ejected on Day 54. Zé Miguel was evicted on Day 56 with 62% of the public vote.

=== Week 9 (November 29th to December 5th) ===
Secret Missions & Tasks: Many secret missions were held, and the task for the storage time was to play a golf game.

Secrets: A lot of attempts to discover secrets were made, but no one got it right.

Nominations: Ana Isabel and Joana were both nominated with 2 votes.

Eviction: Joana was evicted with 54% of the public vote.

=== Week 10 (December 6th to December 12th) ===
Secret Missions & Tasks: Many secret missions were held, and the task for the storage time was to knit scarves as long as they could.

Secrets: On Day 65 Andreia discovered Vera's secret. On Day 66 Ivo discovered Andreia's secret. Many other attempts were made.

Nominations: On Day 65 all the male housemates received one nomination and are up.

Eviction: Hugo F. was evicted with 46% of the public vote on Day 70.

=== Week 11 (December 13th to December 19th) ===
Secret Missions & Tasks: Many secret missions were held, including the storage and the Facebook mission.

Secrets: Many attempts were made to discover the remaining secrets.

Nominations: On Day 72 Ana Isabel and Andreia received 2 nominations and are up for eviction.

Eviction: Andreia was evicted on Day 77 with 55% of the public vote.

=== Week 12 (December 20th to December 26th) ===
Secret Missions, Tasks & Accounts: Many secret missions were made on this week.

Secrets: A lot of clues were put in the house for the two secrets left. António discovered Ivo's secret, while Ivo discovered António's secret.

== Nominations Table ==
Each week the nominations alternated: male housemates nominate female housemates one week, and female housemates nominate male housemates the following week. Except the special rule made by 'a Voz'.

| | Week 1 | | Week 2 | Week 3 | Week 4 | Week 5 | Week 6 | Week 7 | Week 8 | Week 9 | Week 10 | Week 11 | Week 13 Final | |
| | Day 3 | Day 5 | Week 2 | Week 3 | Week 4 | Week 5 | Week 6 | Week 7 | Week 8 | Week 9 | Week 10 | Week 11 | Week 13 Final | |
|---|---|---|---|---|---|---|---|---|---|---|---|---|---|---|
| António | No; Nominations | Joana, Doriana | Not; Eligible | Vera, Daniela | Not; Eligible | Jade, Ana Isabel | Not; Eligible | Andreia, **Ana Isabel** | Not; Eligible | Ana Isabel, Andreia | Not; Eligible | Ana Isabel, Andreia | **Winner** (Day 90) | |
| Ana Isabel | No; Nominations | Not; Eligible | Vasco, Renato | Not; Eligible | **Renato**, Hugo M. | Not; Eligible | Zé Miguel, António | Not; Eligible | Ivo, **Zé Miguel** | Not; Eligible | Ivo | Not; Eligible | **Runner-Up** (Day 90) | |
| Vera | No; Nominations | Not; Eligible | Zé Miguel, Vítor | Not; Eligible | **Vítor**, Hugo F. | Not; Eligible | Hugo F., Vítor | Not; Eligible | **Vítor**, Hugo F. | Not; Eligible | Hugo F. | Not; Eligible | **Third place** (Day 90) | |
| Ivo | No; Nominations | Ana Isabel, Joana | Not; Eligible | Ana Isabel, Jade | Exempt | Ana Isabel, Jade | Not; Eligible | Ana Isabel, **Catarina** | Not; Eligible | Ana Isabel, Joana | Not; Eligible | Ana Isabel, Andreia | **Fourth place** (Day 90) | |
| Andreia | No; Nominations | Not; Eligible | Vítor, Zé Miguel | Not; Eligible | **Vítor**, Hugo F. | Exempt | Zé Miguel, António | Not; Eligible | Hugo F., **Zé Miguel** | Not; Eligible | António | Not; Eligible | Evicted (Day 78) | |
| Hugo F. | No; Nominations | Jade, Doriana | Not; Eligible | Daniela, Joana | Not; Eligible | Vera, Joana | Not; Eligible | **Joana**, Andreia | Not; Eligible | Joana, Vera | Not; Eligible | Evicted (Day 71) | | |
| Joana | No; Nominations | Not; Eligible | Renato, Ivo | Not; Eligible | **Vítor**, Hugo F. | Not; Eligible | Hugo F., Vítor | Not; Eligible | **Vítor**, Hugo F. | Not; Eligible | Evicted (Day 64) | | | |
| Zé Miguel | No; Nominations | Andreia, Vera | Not; Eligible | Andreia, Daniela | Not; Eligible | Catarina, Jade | Not; Eligible | Andreia, **Catarina** | Not; Eligible | Evicted (Day 57) | | | | |
| Vítor | No; Nominations | Joana, Doriana | Not; Eligible | Andreia, Vera | Not; Eligible | Vera, Joana | Not; Eligible | **Joana**, Andreia | Not; Eligible | Ejected (Day 55) | | | | |
| Catarina | No; Nominations | Not; Eligible | Vasco, Hugo M. | Not; Eligible | **Renato**, Zé Miguel | Not; Eligible | Zé Miguel, António | Not; Eligible | Evicted (Day 50) | | | | | |
| Hugo M. | No; Nominations | Jade, Vera | Not; Eligible | Ana Isabel, Jade | Not; Eligible | Jade, Ana Isabel | Nominated | Evicted (Day 43) | | | | | | |
| Jade | No; Nominations | Not; Eligible | Vasco, Hugo M. | Not; Eligible | Hugo M., **Renato** | Not; Eligible | Evicted (Day 36) | | | | | | | |
| Renato | Nominated | Joana, Ana Isabel | Not; Eligible | Joana, Ana Isabel | Not; Eligible | Evicted (Day 29) | | | | | | | | |
| Daniela | No; Nominations | Not; Eligible | Vítor, António | Not; Eligible | Evicted (Day 22) | | | | | | | | | |
| Vasco | No; Nominations | Joana, Doriana | Not; Eligible | Evicted (Day 15) | | | | | | | | | | |
| Doriana | No; Nominations | Not; Eligible | Evicted (Day 8) | | | | | | | | | | | |
| Mário | Nominated | Evicted (Day 5) | | | | | | | | | | | | |
| Up for eviction | Mário; Renato | Doriana; Joana | Vasco; Vítor | Ana Isabel; Daniela | Renato; Vítor | Ana Isabel; Jade | António; Hugo M. Zé Miguel | Andreia; Catarina; Joana | Hugo F. ~~Vítor~~; Zé Miguel | Ana Isabel; Joana | António; Hugo F. Ivo | Ana Isabel; Andreia | All housemates | |
| Nomination notes | 1 | 2 | 3 | 4 | 5, 6, 7 | 8, 9 | 10, 11 | 12, 13 | 14, 15, 16 | 17 | 18 | 19 | 20 | |
| Ejected | none | | | | | | | | **Vítor** | none | | | | |
| Evicted | **Mário**; 27% to save | **Doriana**; 68% to evict | **Vasco**; 69% to evict | **Daniela**; 62% to evict | **Renato**; 73% to evict | **Jade**; 56% to evict | **Hugo M.** 53% to evict | **Catarina**; 37% to evict | **Zé Miguel**; 62% to evict | **Joana**; 54% to evict | **Hugo F.** 46% to evict | **Andreia**; 55% to evict | **Ivo**; 12% to win | **Vera**; 17% to win |
| Evicted | **Mário**; 27% to save | **Doriana**; 68% to evict | **Vasco**; 69% to evict | **Daniela**; 62% to evict | **Renato**; 73% to evict | **Jade**; 56% to evict | **Hugo M.** 53% to evict | **Catarina**; 37% to evict | **Zé Miguel**; 62% to evict | **Joana**; 54% to evict | **Hugo F.** 46% to evict | **Andreia**; 55% to evict | **Ana Isabel**; 28% to win | **António**; 43% to win |

=== Notes ===
- Note 1: Mário and Renato were on a secret mission related to their shared secret. They are twins and while one is visible in the house, the other is in a secret room. They alternate, both under the name Renato. If the other housemates find out before Day 2, they will be both up for eviction. If they succeed, both will stay in the house. Their secret was discovered on Day 2 by Ana Isabel, and therefore they went up for eviction. Mário was eliminated on day 4.
- Note 2: In round one of the nominations, only male housemates could nominate and only female housemates could be nominated.
- Note 3: In round two of nominations, only female housemates could nominate and only male housemates could be nominated.
- Note 4: In round three of nominations, only male housemates could nominate and only female housemates could be nominated.
- Note 5: On Day 22 the phone rang. Ivo was the first to answer to it and by doing that he immunized himself from being nominated.
- Note 6: In round four of nominations, only female housemates could be nominated and only male housemates could be nominated.
- Note 7: Hugo F, Renato and Vítor all had three votes. In the Portuguese version of the rules, only two housemates can be up for eviction, thus there was a second round of nominations. In bold is the housemate nominated in the second round. In the second round, only girls could nominate, and they could only nominate the 3 housemates that were tied.
- Note 8: The phone rang on Day 30. As Andreia was the first to answer the phone, she won immunization from the nominations.
- Note 9: In round five of nominations, only male housemates could nominate and only female housemates could be nominated.
- Note 10: Hugo M. was automatically nominated for constant breaking of the rules imposed by "a Voz".
- Note 11: In round six of nominations, only female housemates could nominate, and only male housemates could be nominated. This week there was an exception in rules, that it was 3 housemates up for eviction rather than two.
- Note 12: In round seven of nominations, only male housemates could nominate, and only female housemates could be nominated.
- Note 13: In the first round Andreia received 4 votes and was automatically up, but Joana, Ana Isabel and Catarina received two votes and went to a 2nd round. In that round, Joana and Catarina both received two votes and tied, and therefore are up with Andreia. In bold are the nominations that housemates made in the 2nd round.
- Note 14: In round eight of nominations, only female housemates could nominate, and only male housemates could be nominated.
- Note 15: In the first round Hugo F. received 3 votes and was automatically up, but Vítor and Zé Miguel received 2 votes and went to a 2nd round. In that round, both received two votes and tied, and therefore are up with Hugo F.. In bold are the nominations that housemates made in the 2nd round.
- Note 16: Vítor was originally nominated but later he was ejected.
- Note 17: In round nine of nominations, only male housemates could nominate, and only female housemates could be nominated.
- Note 18: In round ten of nominations, only female housemates could nominate, and only male housemates could be nominated. Housemates nominated only one person.
- Note 19: In round eleven of nominations, only male housemates could nominate, and only female housemates could be nominated.
- Note 20: On the last two weeks there were no nominations and people voted for who they wanted to win.

=== Nominations totals received ===
| | Week 1 | | Week 2 | Week 3 | Week 4 | Week 5 | Week 6 | Week 7 | Week 8 | Week 9 | Week 10 | Week 11 | Week 13 | Total |
|---|---|---|---|---|---|---|---|---|---|---|---|---|---|---|
| António | – | – | 1 | – | 0 | – | 3 | – | 0 | – | 1 | – | **Winner** | 5 |
| Ana Isabel | – | 2 | – | 3 | – | 3 | – | 2 | – | 2 | – | 2 | **Runner-Up** | 14 |
| Vera | – | 2 | – | 2 | – | 2 | – | 0 | – | 1 | – | 0 | **3rd Place** | 7 |
| Ivo | – | – | 1 | – | – | – | 0 | – | 1 | – | 1 | – | **4th Place** | 3 |
| Andreia | – | 1 | – | 2 | – | – | – | 4 | – | 1 | – | 2 | Evicted | 6 |
| Hugo F. | – | – | 0 | – | 3 | – | 2 | – | 3 | – | 1 | Evicted | | 9 |
| Joana | – | 5 | – | 2 | – | 2 | – | 2 | – | 2 | Evicted | | | 13 |
| Zé Miguel | – | – | 2 | – | 1 | – | 3 | – | 2 | Evicted | | | | 8 |
| Vítor | – | – | 3 | – | 3 | – | 2 | – | 2 | Ejected | | | | 10 |
| Catarina | – | 0 | – | 0 | – | 1 | – | 2 | Evicted | | | | | 3 |
| Hugo M. | – | – | 2 | – | 2 | – | – | Evicted | | | | | | 4 |
| Jade | – | 2 | – | 2 | – | 4 | Evicted | | | | | | | 8 |
| Renato | – | – | 2 | – | 3 | Evicted | | | | | | | | 5 |
| Daniela | – | 0 | – | 3 | Evicted | | | | | | | | | 3 |
| Vasco | – | – | 3 | Evicted | | | | | | | | | | 3 |
| Doriana | – | 4 | Evicted | | | | | | | | | | | 4 |
| Mário | – | Evicted | | | | | | | | | | | | 0 |

=== Nominations: Results ===
| Weeks | Nominated |
|---|---|
| Week 1 | **Mário (27%)**, Renato (73%) |
| Week 1 | **Doriana (68%)**, Joana (32%) |
| Week 2 | **Vasco (69%)**, Vítor (31%) |
| Week 3 | **Daniela (62%)**, Ana Isabel (38%) |
| Week 4 | **Renato (73%)**, Vítor (23%) |
| Week 5 | **Jade (56%)**, Ana Isabel (44%) |
| Week 6 | **Hugo M. (53%)**, Zé Miguel (29%), António (18%) |
| Week 7 | **Catarina (37%)**, Joana (32%), Andreia (31%) |
| Week 8 | ~~Vítor,~~ **Zé Miguel (62%)**, Hugo F. (38%) |
| Week 9 | **Joana (54%)**, Ana Isabel (46%) |
| Week 10 | **Hugo F. (46%)**, António (29%), Ivo (25%) |
| Week 11 | **Andreia (55%)**, Ana Isabel (45%) |
| Final | **António (43%)**, Ana Isabel (28%), Vera (17%), Ivo (12%) |

== Ratings ==
Eviction shows took place on Sundays, with the exception of the first eviction that took place on a Thursday.

| Show No. | Date | Share | Rating | Rank (timeslot) | Rank (day) |
|---|---|---|---|---|---|
| Launch | 3 October | 48.5% | 15.1 | 1st | 1st |
| Eviction #1 (Nomination) ^{1} | 7 October | 33.8% | 13.9 | 1st | 2nd |
| Eviction #2 | 10 October | 41.3% | 13.9 | 1st | 1st |
| Eviction #3 | 17 October | 43.8% | 13.9 | 1st | 1st |
| Eviction #4 | 24 October | 43.6% | 14.0 | 1st | 1st |
| Eviction #5 | 31 October | 43.9% | 12.9 | 1st | 1st |
| Eviction #6 | 7 November | 39.4% | 12.4 | 1st | 1st |
| Eviction #7 | 14 November | 43.0% | 13.9 | 1st | 4th |
| Eviction #8 | 21 November | 41.2% | 13.6 | 1st | 1st |
| Eviction #9 | 28 November | 44.7% | 15.2 | 1st | 2nd |
| Eviction #10 | 5 December | 46.6% | 15.2 | 1st | 1st |
| Eviction #11 | 12 December | 44.3% | 14.0 | 1st | 1st |
| Eviction #12 | 19 December | 45.9% | 16.4 | 1st | 1st |
| Christmas special | 26 December | 43.8% | 15.6 | 1st | 1st |
| Final | 31 December | 62.7% | 18.2 | 1st | 1st |

Note 1: This show was considered a nomination show.
