= Andy Picci =

Swiss conceptual artist

- Born: Andrea Picci
- Education: Central Saint Martins
- Website: andypicci.com

Andrea Picci is a conceptual artist. His work analyses the profound quest for self-identity and its construction through the virtualization of our society.

== Early life ==
Picci grew up in Switzerland. He studied photography at ECAL, visual communication at ESAM Design in Paris, and has a MFA from Central Saint Martins in London.

== Career ==
In 2015, Picci staged an artistic performance in which he dressed as Pete Doherty, fooling some photojournalists and having his picture published on Le Parisien's front-page as Doherty's.

"By embodying a false Doherty on a photograph presented as a true one, the doppelgänger joined an appropriationist art process in a Richard Prince’s style, questioning the construction of identity (hello Cindy Sherman) and tackled our Society of the Spectacle," stated the French newspaper Les Inrockuptibles.

In April 2017, Picci published a book of poetry, Essais de gloire (Anatomie de mon coeur en été).

In June 2018, he showed a series of copies of historic paintings altered to resemble Nabilla Benattia. Benattia said she was "very flattered" by the exhibition.

In 2019, he published a series of Instagram face filters. The filters questioned user's relation to selfie.

In 2020, Picci was part of the group show "Link in Bio" at MdbK (Museum der Bildenden Künste), Leipzig, DE. Curated by Anika Meier, the exhibition explored the impact of social media on contemporary art and showcased how artists have harnessed platforms like Instagram for creative expression.

In October 2021, he was part of "Global Gallery", a collaborative project developed by König Gallery for Porsche. This initiative turned major city screens, like the ones of Times Square and Shibuya Crossing into digital exhibition spaces.

In 2022, Andy Picci was included in the "Class of 2022", a global initiative by CIRCA and Dazed. This project featured the works of 30 emerging artists, which art was showcased on the screens of Piccadilly Circus, London, Uk.

From January to April 2023, his work was exhibited at Paradisoterrestre Gallery (founded by Dino Gavina) in Bologna, alonside works by Paola Pivi, Allen Jones, Tobia Scarpa, Roberto Matta, Kazuhide Takahama and more.

In November 2024, Picci's work has been exhibited at Sotheby's Paris as part of Attention Fragile curated by Colette's founder Sarah Andelman. The exhibition which also presented works from Katerina Jebb, Raphael Zarka, Fred Mortagne was a celebration of skateboarding culture, bringing together treasures from artists and creatives across the globe, mixed with a selection of Sotheby’s Buy Now handbags, jewelry and more.

== Publications ==
=== Poetry ===
- Essais de Gloire (Anatomie de mon coeur en été), Éditions de la Marquise, Lausanne 2017. ISBN 978-2-940591-03-9

=== Featured ===
- PZ World, IDEA ltd, PZToday, London 2018. REF 11545
- Futures Of Love, Magasins Généraux, Paris 2019. ISBN 978-2-9563028-3-4
- Link In Bio - Art After Social Media, City of Leipzig, Museum der BildendenKünste Leipzig, Germany 2020. ISBN 978-3-86828-984-8
