= Secret Story (French TV series) season 3 =

Secret Story
- Season 3
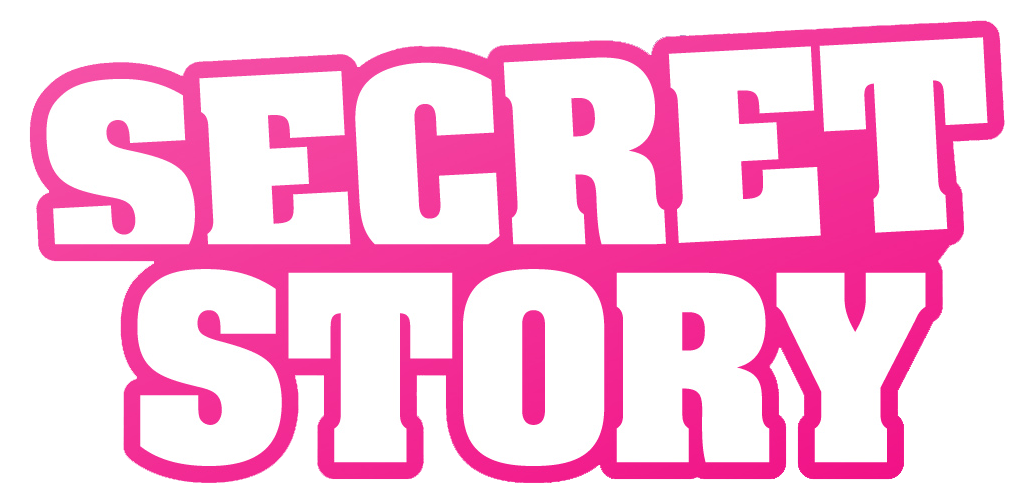
- Presented by: Benjamin Castaldi; Adrien Lemaître (After Secret); Nikos Aliagas (replacement) (Note: During this season, Nikos Aliagas replaced Benjamin Castaldi for certains shows due to a sick leave.)
- No. of days: 99
- No. of housemates: 20
- Winner: Emilie
- Runner-up: Jonathan
- Companion show: After Secret

Release
- Original network: TF1
- Original release: 19 June – 25 September 2009

Season chronology
- ← Previous; Season 2 Next → Season 4

Secret Story 2009 is the third edition of the French reality show Secret Story. It began airing on TF1 on June 19, 2009, and continue to air until September 25, 2009, lasting 99 days, and is presented by Benjamin Castaldi, who presented Loft Story and the first two seasons of Secret Story.

== Principle ==
The principle is similar to that of Loft Story. The contestants are kept locked away for 14 weeks in a house, called "La Maison des Secrets" (the House of Secrets) measuring 1600m² styled on the UK Big Brother house including a swimming pool, Jacuzzi, a lounge, a big bedroom divided by a shattered glass, bathroom with showers and 5 secrets room which are the Crystal room, Love Cave, Museum of Secrets, White Room and Bedsit (like Big Brother 5). All of the rooms are installed with cameras, (except the toilet due to a law imposed by the Conseil Supérieur de l'audiovisuel). The Voice speaks to the contestants at times, and acts like Big Brother in other countries. Each contestant has to conceal a secret which the other contestants must try to discover. If a contestant does, that contestant wins the jackpot of the contestant whose secret they have guessed. Each secret is worth €10,000. Each Tuesday, 2 contestants are nominated and put up against the public vote, one housemate will be evicted every Friday. Housemates are only permitted to nominate every other week and housemates are only allowed to nominate other housemates of the opposite sex.

The third series of Secret Story launched on the 19th of June 2009 with eighteen housemates entering the house. On Day 8 a new housemate previously dubbed as Mystery Candidate, Martin, entered the house.

== Housemates ==
=== Angie ===
Angie Be is a 32-year-old model from Paris. She entered the house with her two pet chihuahuas. In week one she was a part of "Intruder Fraternity" who were placed at a separate "Intruder" house where they lived and tried to discover the other housemates secrets. Angie entered the main house in week two. She had a romance with Romain who proposed her before being evicted. Angie was nominated for eviction in round six of nominations and survived. Angie was again nominated in week ten against Sabrina and was evicted on day 71 after receiving 44% of the vote to save.

=== Bruno ===
Bruno is a 19-year-old from France. Bruno was a homeless for a year. He has been recognized by Emilie, she decided not to reveal his secret. Bruno was automatically nominated for eviction for the first, and only, time in the last round of nominations along with most of his fellow housemates. He was the third person to be evicted in a triple (and the final) eviction on day 92 after receiving 11% of the publics vote to stay.

=== Cindy ===
Cindy is a 26-year-old from France. Cindy is a bisexual, this revelation is from Martin's interview. She kept her secret until the end of the game. On finale night, she came in 3rd place.

=== Daniela ===
Daniela is a 22-year-old who lives in Luxembourg but is originally from Portugal. Daniela was nominated for eviction against Emilie in the first round of nominations and was evicted with an unknown percentage of the vote on day 8. Daniela's secret was that she had slept with a footballer. She participated in the first Portuguese version, where she was the 4th housemate evicted on Day 21.

=== Didier ===
Didier is a 26-year-old from France. His secret is that he is married to housemate Élise. Dider is also a transvestite who uses the name Alicia for his female alias. Didier was automatically nominated for eviction for the first, and only, time in the last round of nominations along with most of his fellow housemates. He was the second person to be evicted in a triple(and the final) eviction on day 92 after receiving 9% of the publics vote to stay.

=== Élisabeth ===
Élisabeth Fanger is a 53-year-old from France. Her secret was that she was an ex international criminal on the run. Elisabeth was unanimously nominated in round six of nominations against Angie. Elisabeth was evicted on day 43 after receiving only 39% of the vote.

=== Elise ===
Élise is a 25-year-old from France. Her secret is that she is married to housemate Didier. Elise was nominated in round eight of nominations against Sabrina, she was ultimately evicted having received only 33% of the vote on day 57.

=== Emilie ===
Emilie is a 21-year-old from France. Her secret is that she is Vanessa's worst enemy after Vanessa tried to steal her boyfriend. But in order to keep their secret, they must pretend that they are best friends. Vanessa later revealed that the secret was a complete lie. She was named the winner of Secret Story 3 with 39% of the 4 way vote.

=== François-Xavier ===
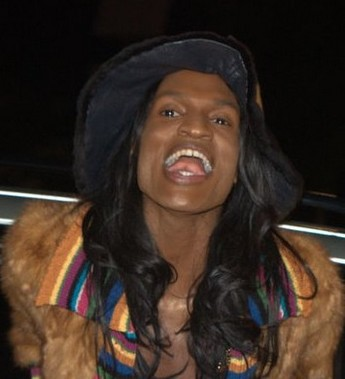
François-Xavier, at 2011 NRJ Music Awards

Francois-Xavier is an eccentric and effeminate 20-year-old from France. His secret is that he is the son of a millionaire. In an unknown episode he decided to talk behind his friends back to win 3 000 euros. He did not know that his friends were listening that day. Francois-Xavier was first nominated for eviction in round seven against Jonathan and Romain and barely survived. Francois-Xavier was automatically nominated for eviction in the last round of nominations along with most of his fellow housemates. He was the first person to be evicted in a triple (and the final) eviction on day 92 after receiving 4% of the public's vote to stay. François-Xavier died on 9 August 2011, having committed suicide.

=== Jonathan ===
Jonathan is a 23-year-old from France. His secret is that his IQ is equivalent to Albert Einstein's. On finale night, he was named runner up, losing to Emilie.

=== Kevin ===
Kevin is a 21-year-old from France. He is a part of "Intruder Fraternity" who were placed at a separate "Intruder" House where they have to try and discover the other housemates secrets. They remain immune from eviction until they are discovered. In round eleven of nominations Kevin was nominated against Jonathan. Kevin was evicted on day 78 after receiving 39% of the vote to stay.

=== Léo ===
Leo is a 20-year-old from France. He is a part of "Intruder Fraternity" who were placed at a separate "Intruder" House where they have to try and discover the other housemates secrets. They remain immune from eviction until they are discovered. He was the first Intruder to enter the main house in week one. In round five of nominations Leo was automatically nominated by La Voix, though initially nominated against Jonathan and Romain, it was decided by La Voix that Leo should face a housemate, as opposed to a public, vote alone to decide if he should be ejected. Leo lost the vote and was ejected on day 36.

=== Maija ===
Marie-Noëlle aka Maija is a 30-year-old from Canada. Maija's secret is that she survived the tsunami.

=== Martin ===
Martin is a 19-year-old from France. Martin entered the house on day 8 and was nominated for eviction along with Jonathan following the second round of nominations and was evicted on day 15 after receiving only 32% of the vote. His secret was that he is a millionaire.

=== Nicolas ===
Nicolas is a 28-year-old from Belgium. His secret is that he is in communications with Dalida. Nicolas was automatically nominated for eviction by La Voix in round four of nominations against Maija and Sabrina. Nicolas was evicted on day 29 after receiving only 12% of the public vote.

=== Romain ===
Romain Chavent is a 33-year-old from France. He was married to playmate Shauna Sand. In week one he was a part of the "Intruder Fraternity" who were placed at a separate "Intruder" house where they had to try and discover the other housemates secrets. In week three he was nominated by La Voix for revealing his secret to Jonathan and faced the public vote alone. Romain survived his first nomination having garnered 59% of the vote to stay. Romain was nominated again in week seven against Francois-Xavier and Jonathan and was evicted on day 50 after receiving only 29% of the vote to stay. Before leaving, he proposed to Angie, wishing that she continued the game as far as possible.

=== Sabrina ===
Sabrina is a 19-year-old from France. Her secret is that she is still a virgin and she wants to remain as one. She came in fourth place.

=== Vanessa ===
Vanessa is 21 years old. Her secret is that she is Emilie's worst enemy after she tried to steal Emilie's boyfriend. But in order to keep their secret, they must pretend that they are best friends.

In 2015 she participated for the second time in Secret Story, however she is playing under the name "Lisa", as her secret for that edition is "I am a former Secret Story contestant".

== Houseguests ==
=== Rachel Legrain-Trapani "Rosa" ===
Rachel Legrain-Trapani, participating in the show under the name Rosa, entered the house on Day 1 and quit on Day 4. Her secret was that she was Miss France 2007. Her secret was discovered on the first day by fellow housemate Léo, and she left the house on Day 4.

=== Secret ===
Secret is a dog. He entered the house on Day 36. His secret is that he was a candidate at the election of Marseille Mayor. His real name is Saucisse.

== Secrets ==
Name	Age	Country	Secret	Discovered by	Status
Emilie	21	France	"We are the worst enemies" (with Vanessa)	Leo (Day 26)	Winner
Jonathan	23	France	"I have the IQ of Einstein"	Maija (Day 39)	Runner-Up
Cindy	26	France	"I'm bisexual"	Undiscovered Revealed (Day 92)	Third Place
Sabrina	19	France	"I decided to remain a virgin"	Maija (Day 50)	Fourth Place
Bruno	19	France	"I used to be homeless"	Jonathan (Day 25)	Evicted
Didier	26	France	"We are a married couple" (with Élise)	Jonathan (Day 19)	Evicted
François-Xavier	20	France	"I am a millionaire"	Cindy (Day 61)	Evicted
Vanessa	21	France	"We are the worst enemies" (with Emilie)	Leo (Day 26)	Evicted
Kevin	21	France	"We are the intruders of the house" (with Angie, Leo and Romain)	François-Xavier (Day 22)	Evicted
Angie	32	France	"We are the intruders of the house" (with Kevin, Leo and Romain)	François-Xavier (Day 22)	Evicted
Maija	29	Canada	"I survived the Pacific Ocean tsunami "	Revealed (Day 57)	Evicted
Élise	25	France	"We are a married couple" (with Didier)	Jonathan (Day 19)	Evicted
Romain	33	United States	"We are the intruders of the house" (with Angie, Leo and Kevin)	Revealed (Day 22)	Evicted
Elisabeth	53	France	"I was tracked by Interpol for 2 years"	Revealed (Day 43)	Evicted
Leo	20	France	"We are the intruders of the house" (with Angie, Romain and Kevin)	François-Xavier (Day 22)	Ejected
Nicolas	28	Belgium	"I am in communication with Dalida"	Angie (Day 26)	Evicted
Martin	19	France	"I am a millionaire"	Revealed (Day 15)	Evicted
Daniela	22	Luxembourg	"I was the mistress of a Golden Ball"	Revealed (Day 64)	Evicted

== Nominations ==
Nominations follow a different formula than is typical of the Big Brother franchise. Each week the housemates alternate nominations : male housemates nominate female housemates one week, and female housemates nominate male housemates the following week. In some weeks housemates are only permitted to nominate one housemate, rather than the typical two.

	Week 1	Week 2	Week 3	Week 4	Week 5	Week 6	Week 7	Week 8	Week 9	Week 10	Week 11	Week 12	Week 13	Week 14 Final	
Émilie	Not eligible	Jonathan; Nicolas	No nominations	Not eligible	~~Kevin~~; ~~Jonathan~~	Not eligible	Romain; FX	Secret; Room	No nominations	Not eligible	Not eligible	Vanessa; Bruno	No nominations	Winner (Day 99)	
Jonathan	Vanessa; Cindy	Not eligible	No nominations	Vanessa; Sabrina	Not eligible	Elisabeth; Angie	~~Emilie~~; ~~Cindy~~	Secret; Room	Nominated	Not eligible	Nominated	FX; Bruno	Exempt	Runner-Up (Day 99)	
Cindy	Not eligible	Martin; Bruno	No nominations	Not eligible	~~Kevin~~; ~~Bruno~~	Not eligible	Jonathan; Romain	Not eligible	No nominations	Not eligible	Not eligible	Emilie; Bruno	No nominations	Third Place (Day 99)	
Sabrina	Not eligible	Jonathan; Nicolas	No nominations	Not eligible	~~Romain~~; ~~Jonathan~~	Not eligible	Romain; FX	Nominated	No nominations	Nominated	Not eligible	Vanessa; Bruno	No nominations	Fourth Place (Day 99)	
Bruno	Elisabeth; Daniela	Not eligible	No nominations	Angie; Maija(x2)	Not eligible	Elisabeth; Angie	~~Emilie~~; ~~Sabrina~~	Elise	No nominations	Not eligible	Not eligible	Emilie; Cindy	No nominations	Evicted (Day 92)	
Didier	Daniela; Emilie	Not eligible	No nominations	Angie(x2); Maija	Not eligible	Emilie; Elisabeth	~~Emilie~~; ~~Sabrina~~	Vanessa	No nominations	Angie; Sabrina	Not eligible	Emilie; Bruno	No nominations	Evicted (Day 92)	
FX	Daniela; Emilie	Not eligible	No nominations	Angie; Maija(x2)	Not eligible	Elisabeth; Angie	~~Emilie~~; ~~Sabrina~~	Elise	No nominations	Not eligible	Exempt	Emilie; Cindy	No nominations	Evicted (Day 92)	
Vanessa	Not eligible	Jonathan; Nicolas	No nominations	Not eligible	~~Jonathan~~; ~~FX~~	Exempt	Romain; Jonathan	Not eligible	No nominations	Not eligible	Jonathan; Kevin	Jonathan; FX	Evicted (Day 85)		
Kévin	In Intruder; Mansion		No nominations	Vanessa; Sabrina(x2)	Not eligible	Elisabeth; Angie	~~Emilie~~; ~~Sabrina~~	Elise	No nominations	Not eligible	Nominated	Vanessa	Evicted (Day 78)		
Angie	In Intruder; Mansion	Martin; FX	No nominations	Not eligible	~~Jonathan~~; ~~Bruno~~	Not eligible	Romain; Bruno	Not eligible	No nominations	Nominated	Evicted (Day 71)				
Maija	Not eligible	Martin; Bruno	No nominations	Not eligible	~~Didier~~; ~~Jonathan~~	Not eligible	Romain; FX	Not eligible	Nominated	Evicted (Day 64)					
Élise	Not eligible	Martin; Jonathan	No nominations	Not eligible	~~Romain~~; ~~Jonathan~~	Not eligible	Romain; Jonathan	Not eligible	Evicted (Day 57)						
Romain	In Intruder; Mansion	Exempt	Nominated	Vanessa; Sabrina(x2)	Not eligible	Elisabeth; Angie	~~Sabrina~~; ~~Cindy~~	Evicted (Day 50)							
Élisabeth	Not eligible	Bruno; Martin	No nominations	Not eligible	~~Romain~~; ~~Jonathan~~	Not eligible	Evicted (Day 43)								
Léo	Daniela; Emilie	In Intruder; Mansion	No nominations	Maija(x2); Angie	Nominated	Ejected (Day 36)									
Nicolas	Elise; Sabrina	Not eligible	No nominations	Cindy; Sabrina; Angie	Evicted (Day 29)										
Martin	Not in house	Not eligible	Evicted (Day 15)												
Daniela	Not eligible	Evicted (Day 8)													
Nomination Notes	1,2	3,4, 5	6	7,8,9	10, 11, 12	13,14	15	16,17	18	19	20, 21	22, 23	24	None	
Up for eviction	Daniela; Emilie	Jonathan; Martin	Romain	Maija; Nicolas; Sabrina	~~Leo~~; ~~Jonathan~~; ~~Romain~~	Angie; Elisabeth	FX; Jonathan; Romain	Elise; Sabrina	Jonathan; Maija	Angie; Sabrina	Jonathan; Kevin	Bruno; Emilie; Vanessa	Bruno; Cindy; Didier; Emilie; FX; Sabrina	All housemates	
Ejected	none				Léo	none									
Evicted	Daniela; 40% to save	Martin; 32% to save	Romain; 59% to save	Nicolas; 12% to save	Eviction cancelled	Elisabeth; 39% to save	Romain; 29% to save	Elise; 33% to save	Maija; 28% to save	Angie; 44% to save	Kevin; 39% to save	Vanessa; 13% to save	Bruno; 11% to save	Sabrina; 8% to win	Cindy; 23% to win
Evicted	Daniela; 40% to save	Martin; 32% to save	Romain; 59% to save	Nicolas; 12% to save	Eviction cancelled	Elisabeth; 39% to save	Romain; 29% to save	Elise; 33% to save	Maija; 28% to save	Angie; 44% to save	Kevin; 39% to save	Vanessa; 13% to save	Didier; 9% to save	Sabrina; 8% to win	Cindy; 23% to win
Evicted	Daniela; 40% to save	Martin; 32% to save	Romain; 59% to save	Nicolas; 12% to save	Eviction cancelled	Elisabeth; 39% to save	Romain; 29% to save	Elise; 33% to save	Maija; 28% to save	Angie; 44% to save	Kevin; 39% to save	Vanessa; 13% to save	Didier; 9% to save	Jonathan; 30% to win	Emilie; 39% to win
Evicted	Daniela; 40% to save	Martin; 32% to save	Romain; 59% to save	Nicolas; 12% to save	Eviction cancelled	Elisabeth; 39% to save	Romain; 29% to save	Elise; 33% to save	Maija; 28% to save	Angie; 44% to save	Kevin; 39% to save	Vanessa; 13% to save	FX; 4% to save	Jonathan; 30% to win	Emilie; 39% to win

=== Notes ===
- ^Note 1: In round one of nominations only male housemates could nominate.
- ^Note 2: As Angie, Kevin, and Romain were only intruders they could not be nominated for eviction.
- ^Note 3: In round two of nominations only female housemates could nominate.
- ^Note 4: As Kevin and Leo were only intruders they could not be nominated for eviction.
- ^Note 5: In week two La Voix gave Romain the choice between immunity from the second eviction or 10,000 euros, Romain chose to take the immunity.
- ^Note 6: In week three, Romain revealed his secret to Jonathan, and as punishment he was automatically nominated and faced the public vote alone.
- ^Note 7: In round four of nominations only male housemates were allowed to nominate.
- ^Note 8: In round four of nominations there was a three-way tie between Angie, Maija, and Sabrina. As only two housemates can be nominated at one time, the male housemates were each asked to vote for one of the three to face the public vote. Angie received votes from Didier and Nicolas, Maija received votes from Bruno, Francois-Xavier, and Leo, and Sabrina received votes from Jonathan, Kevin, and Romain. Since Maija and Sabrina received the most votes they remained nominated.
- ^Note 9: In round four of nominations Nicolas was nominated for eviction by La Voix for discussing nominations.
- ^Note 10: In round five of nominations Angie answered the red phone and was told she could nominate anymale housemate for eviction, she chose Leo.
- ^Note 11: In round five of nominations only female housemates could nominate.
- ^Note 12: Nomination results from the fifth round of nominations were discounted and Jonathan and Romain were no longer nominated. Instead of a public vote, on day 36 the housemates were asked to vote on whether or not Leo should be ejected. Angie, Romain, Vanessa, François-Xavier, Jonathan, Cindy, Sabrina, Kevin, Elizabeth and Maija voted against Leo's return so he was ejected. All other housemates, with the exception of Bruno who chose not to vote, voted for Leo to stay.
- ^Note 13: In round six of nominations only male housemates could nominate.
- ^Note 14: Upon his eviction, Nicolas was asked to choose either Cindy or Vanessa to give exemption to in the next female nominations week. Nicolas chose to give Vanessa the exemption.
- ^Note 15: In round seven of nominations all housemates were allowed to nominate, however the male nominations were fake and, as such, no female contestant was nominated.
- ^Note 16: In round eight of nominations Sabrina was automatically nominated by La Voix for revealing her secret.
- ^Note 17: Emilie was exempt from nominations as she had been placed in a secret room following Romain's eviction. For the same reason, Jonathan did not nominate.
- ^Note 18: In week nine Jonathan and Maija were automatically nominated for eviction by La Voix for revealing their secrets, as a result the scheduled nominations were cancelled.
- ^Note 19: In week ten, Didier was unanimously given the power to nominate two girls for eviction by the 5 remaining men, all other housemates were ineligible to nominate.
- ^Note 20: In week eleven, Bruno was given the choice to give immunity to François-Xavier and make everyone lose money or to not give him immunity. He chose to give him immunity.
- ^Note 21: In week eleven, La Voix asked the boys whether or not they wanted Vanessa to single-handedly nominate two boys for eviction and all but Jonathan agreed, all other housemates were ineligible to nominate.
- ^Note 22: In round twelve of nominations housemates were allowed to nominate any housemate regardless of gender, they nominated one during the Friday show (Kevin nominated Vanessa, leading to a tie with Emilie and as such both were nominated) and one on Tuesday.
- ^Note 23: Jonathan won an automatic pass to the finals after discovering a secret in the house.
- ^Note 24: As there was only one week left until the final, all housemates apart from Jonathan were nominated for a triple eviction.
