= Secret Story (French TV series) season 4 =

Secret Story
- Season 4
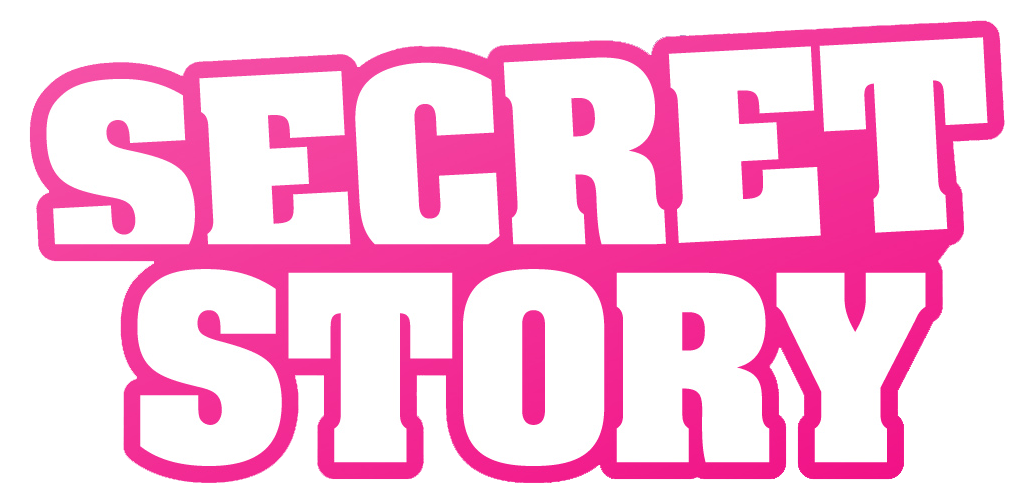
- Presented by: Benjamin Castaldi; Adrien Lemaître (After Secret)
- No. of days: 108
- No. of housemates: 20
- Winner: Benoît
- Runner-up: Senna
- Companion show: After Secret

Release
- Original network: TF1
- Original release: 9 July – 22 October 2010

Season chronology
- ← Previous; Season 3 Next → Season 5

Secret Story 2010 is the fourth edition of the French reality show Secret Story. Casting for season 4 began on Friday, February 19, 2010. The casting announcement came from Emilie NefNaf, the winner of season 3, during the premiere of La Ferme Célébrités, presented by Benjamin Castaldi. This season began on July 7, 2010, and will conclude on October 22, 2010, lasting 108 Days.

== Housemates ==
- Laura, Benoît and Robin were revealed on Secret Story's official website on July 6, 2010. These three candidates lived in an area known as the "apartment" for two days. Only two of them entered the house on day three, after the public voted on the internet for their favorite fake couple.
- On day three, the 17 new housemates including Charlotte, and the fake couple (Benoît and Robin), were revealed live on TF1.
- This is the first time in the history of Secret Story, that three candidates are competing for spots in the house live on the internet and the rest of the cast will be announced live on television, three days after the season begins.

=== Ahmed ===
Ahmed is a 35-year-old from Strasbourg. He is married and has two children. Ahmed entered the house on Day 3 as one of "The Elected" housemates. He was ejected on Day 10 for violence and inappropriate actions towards other housemates.

=== Alexandre ===
Alexandre is a 26-year-old gardener from Paris. Alexandre entered the house on Day 3. His secret is that he's a vampire, which was discovered by Bastien on Day 4. Alexandre turned 26 on Day 11. He was evicted on Day 38, with 48% of the vote to save against Benoît.

=== Amélie ===
Amélie is a 25-year-old from Liège, Belgium. She entered the anti-room on Day 3 after Anne Krystel, Julie and Ahmed decided Charlotte should enter instead of her during the launch show. At the end of the launch show, she entered the anti-room with Maxime and Chrismaëlle, and entered the main house on Day 10 when she correctly guessed the recently ejected Ahmed was one of the three housemates responsible for choosing Charlotte over her. She married Senna during the game. She is eliminated on Day 87.

=== Anne-Krystel ===
Anne Krystel is a 24-year-old businesswoman and supposed "star" from Canada. Anne Krystel entered the house on Day 3 as one of "The Elected" housemates. On Day 31, she and Bastien moved to the secret room where they watched the main housemates for one week with Amélie as their spy. The other housemates believed they had left the house as Anne-Krystel was pregnant, and Bastien was the father. They returned to the main house on Day 38. She's evicted on Day 101 just before the final during the semifinals.

=== Anthony ===
Anthony is 23 years old. Anthony entered the house on Day 3 after Anne Krystel, Julie and Ahmed decided he should enter instead of Chrismaëlle and Maxime. His secret is that he is Mister France 2010, and was discovered on Day 4 by Robin. Anthony was evicted on Day 17.

=== Bastien ===
Bastien is 22 years old. His secret is that he's a mentalist. Bastien entered the house on Day 3. On Day 31, he moved to the secret room with Anne-Krystel where they watched the main housemates for one week with Amélie as their spy. The other housemates believed they had left the house as Anne-Krystel was pregnant, and Bastien was the father. They returned to the main house on Day 38, where it was revealed Bastien was automatically nominated for eviction that week as he had revealed his secret task to Stephanie.

=== Benoît ===
Benoît is a 21-year-old from Paris. Benoît entered the apartment on Day 1 and was voted into the main house along with Robin on Day 3. On Day 7, Robin revealed his and Benoît secret to Anthony, and Robin and Benoît were therefore nominated for eviction together (as a single nominee, rather than two) by La Voix. Benoît is the winner of Secret Story 2010.

=== Charlotte ===
Charlotte is a 19-year-old from Dieppe. Charlotte entered the main house on Day 3 after Anne Krystel, Julie and Ahmed chose her to enter instead of Amélie. She was evicted on day 59.

=== Chrismaëlle ===
Chrismaëlle is a 23-year-old from Mouscron, Belgium. Chrismaëlle entered the anti-room on Day 3 when Anne Krystel, Julie and Ahmed chose Anthony to enter instead of her and Maxime during the launch show. Chrismaëlle entered the main house on Day 10, after correctly guessing that Julie was one of the three housemates responsible for choosing Anthony over herself and Maxime. She's eliminated on day 73.

=== Coralie ===
Coralie is 19 years old and is Stephanie's best friend. Her secret is that both she and Stephanie previously dated Senna. Coralie entered the house on Day 3 and she was evicted on Day 31.

=== Julie ===
Julie is a 24-year-old from Lyon. Julie entered the house on Day 3 as one of "The Elected" housemates. On Day 10, she moved to the anti-room when Chrismaëlle guessed she was one of the housemates responsible for choosing Anthony instead of Chrismaëlle and Maxime. She stayed in the anti-room with Maxime until Day 13, where they moved to the main house. On Day 38, the red phone presented Julie with a dilemma—either she leaves and give Amélie immunity from nominations for two weeks, or Amélie would have to leave. Julie decided to leave the house. She was also a contestant on Top Model 2007.

=== John ===
John is 21 years old from Brussels, Belgium. John entered the house on Day 3 and was evicted on Day 23.

=== Laura ===
Laura is a 21-year-old from Paris. She entered the apartment on Day 1 and was evicted on Day 3 when the public voted for Robin and Benoit to enter the house as the fake couple.

=== Marion ===
Marion is 20 years old. Her secret is that she was a hostage in the kindergarten "human bomb" scenario in 1993. Marion entered the house on Day 3. On Day 5, Marion walked from the show.

=== Maxime ===
Maxime is a 22-year-old from Audincourt. He's a hairdresser. Maxime entered the anti-room on Day 3 when Anne Krystel, Julie and Ahmed chose Anthony to enter over him and Chrismaëlle during the launch show. On Day 10, he had the chance to enter the main house if he could guess the third housemate responsible for choosing Anthony over himself and Chrismaëlle. He chose Alexandre, and as this was incorrect, he remained in the anti-room until Day 13, when he entered the main house. He's eliminated on Day 66.

=== Robin ===
Robin is a 21-year-old bartender from Lyon. Robin entered the apartment on Day 1 and entered the main house as a fake couple with Benoit on Day 3. On Day 7, Robin revealed his and Benoît's secret to Anthony, and Robin and Benoît were therefore nominated for eviction together (as a single nominee, rather than two) by La Voix. He's eliminated on Day 52.

=== Senna ===
Senna is a 20-year-old basketball player. His secret is that he is the former boyfriend of Coralie and Stephanie. Senna entered the house on Day 3. Now he is in couple with Amelie, the blond waitress. They have got a Love-hate relationship. They are now separated. Senna finished second (Runner up) of the adventure and is eliminated on Day 106. He had also a relationship with Julie after the game.

=== Shine ===
Shine who was 28 upon entering is from Switzerland. Her secret is that she escaped from a sect. Shine entered the house on Day 3. On Day 8, Shine celebrated her 29th birthday. Shine was evicted on Day 45.

=== Stéphanie ===
Stéphanie is a 21-year-old from Liège, Belgium, and is best friends with Coralie. Her secret is that both she and Coralie have dated Senna. Stephanie entered the house on Day 3. She's eliminated on Day 106 during the Finale where she finished fourth.

=== Thomas ===
Thomas is 17 years old, the youngest housemate in the house this year. Thomas entered the house on Day 3. His secret is that he was born a hermaphrodite. On Day 15, Thomas celebrated his 18th birthday. He formed a "comedy" duo with Benoit. He's evicted on Day 94.

== Secrets ==
Name	Secrets	Stats
Benoît	"We are the Internet users' favorite fake couple"	Winner
Senna	"Our Exes are in the House"	Runner-Up
Bastien	"I am a Mentalist"	Third place
Stéphanie	"Our Exes are in the House"	Foufh place
Anne-Krystel	"We are The Elected by La Voix"	Evicted
Thomas	"I was born a hermaphrodite"	Evicted
Amélie	"I am a female Don Juan"	Evicted
Chrismaëlle	"I have Hexakosioihexekontahexaphobia"	Evicted
Maxime	"I am a miracle man"	Evicted
Charlotte	"I have the Absolute pitch"	Evicted
Robin	"We are the Internet users' favorite fake couple"	Evicted
Shine	"I got out of a sect"	Evicted
Alexandre	"I am a Vampire"	Evicted
Julie	"We are The Elected by La Voix"	Walked
Coralie	"Our Exes are in the House"	Evicted
John	"I'm the grandson of The Smurfs' father"	Evicted
Anthony	"I am France's most beautiful man"	Evicted
Ahmed	"We are The Elected by La Voix"	Ejected
Marion	"I was held hostage by suicide bombers in 1993 (French: Human Bomb)"	Walked
Laura	"I lost the vote against Benoît and Robin to enter the house"	Evicted

== Weeks ==
=== Week 1 (July 9 to July 16) ===
- Amélie, Maxime and Chrismaelle entered Anti Room after housemates did not pick them to stay in the house on Day 3. They are exempt from nominations and are safe from eviction, however, on Friday, if they correctly identify "The Elected" housemates they will enter the house and the elected will be evicted, if they fail, The Anti Room housemates will be evicted.
- On Day 5, Marion left the show because she didn't feel at ease in the house.
- On Day 10, La Voix (Big Brother) announced that Ahmed was to be ejected from the show. He was ejected due to his inappropriate behavior towards some of the housemates.
- Amélie discovered that Ahmed was an elected housemate. Christmaëlle correctly guessed that Julie was an elected housemate. Because of this, they were both allowed to enter the Main House.

=== Week 2 (July 17 to July 23) ===
- Maxime remained in the Anti-Room and Julie joined him there. Shortly after Julie's arrival, they were informed that they had been automatically pre-nominated for eviction. They each had three days to convince the housemates, who could watch them as well, to save them. At the end of the three days, housemates will decide which they would like to save from nomination.
- On Day 13 (Monday), Housemates voted on who should be nominated between the two, and decided to nominate Julie. Julie re-entered in the Main House with Maxime.
- On Day 14 (Tuesday), The nominees were revealed to be: Julie, Thomas & Anthony.
- In Day 15 (Wednesday), A new room was opened in the house called "Le Couloir des Secrets" ("The Secrets' Hallway") which contains clues on the Housemates' secrets.
- On Day 17 (Friday), Anthony was evicted from the house with only 27% of the vote.

=== Week 3 (July 24 to July 30) ===
- Maxime and Julie received a Secret Mission in which they have to be a fake couple for one week (July 24 to 30).
- Chrismaëlle and John were the nominees this week.
- John was evicted with 48% to save.

=== Week 4 (July 31 to August 6) ===
- Maxime was automatically nominated for eviction for revealing his secret to Julie.
- The nominees were Coralie, Julie and Maxime. Initially, Julie and Anne-Krystel were nominated. However, Anne-Krystel was saved as Coralie had given clues to her secret and was nominated with Maxime and Julie, who received the most nominations.
- Anne-Krystel and Bastien moved to the secret room, where they stayed for one week watching the housemates. Amélie acted as their spy in the house, and the other housemates believed Anne-Krystel and Bastien walked as they were expecting a child.
- Coralie was evicted from the house with 24%.

=== Week 5 (August 7 to August 13) ===
- The nominees this week were Alexandre and Benoît.
- The red phone returned to the house, and revealed to Julie she was automatically nominated (Anne-Krystel and Bastien, in the secret room, had chosen to nominate her). The red phone also gave Chrismaëlle a "double nomination" for the following nominations, and presented Julie with a dilemma - if she was to leave the house, Amélie would receive immunity from future nominations. If she declined, Amélie would have to leave the house. Julie decided to leave the house. The phone also gave Maxime the chance to automatically nominate a female in the next nominations.
- After one week in the secret room, Anne-Krystel and Bastien moved back to the main house. La Voix revealed that Bastien would be automatically nominated for revealing his secret mission to Stephanie.
- Julie's eviction by La Voix.
- In the eviction, Alexandre left the house with 48% vote to save against Benoît.

=== Week 6 (August 14 to August 20) ===
- Bastien, who revealed his mission in common with Anne-Krystel Stephanie (mission that she is pregnant and the father would Bastien), is nominated for office this week. Anne-Krystel and Bastien have the power to automatically nominate a person: their choice is Julie. However, when the red phone to Julie offered to choose between leaving the game and provide immunity to Amelie or vice versa, Julie chose to leave the game Amelie is immune.
- Senna giving heavy clues about his secret Amélie, it is automatically nominated alongside Stephanie share the same secret. Amélie narrowly escapes the nomination thanks to his immunity. Two girls are nominated alongside Bastien, Senna and Stephanie. One of them is nominated by Maxim through the red phone: this is Shine. The other is nominated by Benoit, Robin Thomas and unanimously choosing Anne-Krystel.
- Girls nominated alongside Bastien, Senna and Stephanie are Anne-Krystel and Shine. Shine is eliminated with 7% of the vote.

== Nominations ==
Nominations follow a different formula than is typical of the Big Brother franchise. Each week the housemates alternate nominations: male housemates nominate female housemates one week, and female housemates nominate male housemates the following week. In some weeks housemates are only permitted to nominate one housemate, rather than the typical two; this, usually occurs when at least one housemate has been already nominated by La Voix (The Voice).

	Week 1		Week 2	Week 3	Week 4	Week 5	Week 6	Week 7	Week 8	Week 9	Week 10	Week 11	Week 12	Week 13	Week 14	Week 15 Final	
	Day 1	Day 7	Week 2	Week 3	Week 4	Week 5	Week 6	Week 7	Week 8	Week 9	Week 10	Week 11	Week 12	Week 13	Week 14	Week 15 Final	
Benoît	Nominated	Nominated	Not; Eligible	Coralie	Julie; Anne-Krystel	Not; Eligible	Anne-Krystel	Not; Eligible	Not; Eligible	Anne-Krystel; Bastien; Stéphanie; Maxime	Not; Eligible	Amélie; Anne-Krystel	Amélie; Anne-Krystel	Nominated	Nominated	Winner (Day 108)	
Senna	Not in House	Not; Eligible	Not; Eligible	Chrismaëlle	Julie; Anne-Krystel	Exempt	Nominated	Robin	Charlotte; Stéphanie	Anne-Krystel; Bastien; Stéphanie; Maxime	Not; Eligible	Stéphanie; Anne-Krystel	Stéphanie; Anne-Krystel	Nominated	Nominated	Runner-Up (Day 108)	
Bastien	Not in House	Not; Eligible	Not; Eligible	Chrismaëlle	Julie; Anne-Krystel	Secret; Room	Nominated	Not; Eligible	Not; Eligible	Chrismaëlle; Amélie; Senna; Benoît	Not; Eligible	Amélie; Anne-Krystel	Amélie; Anne-Krystel	Nominated	Exempt	Third Place (Day 108)	
Stéphanie	Not in House	Anthony; Ahmed	Anthony; Robin	John	Not; Eligible	Benoît; Alexandre	Nominated	Benoît; Senna	Not; Eligible	Thomas; Amélie; Senna; Benoît	Senna; Benoît	Not; Eligible	Not; Eligible	Nominated	Nominated	Fourth Place (Day 108)	
Anne-Krystel	Not in House	Ahmed; Anthony	Robin; Anthony	John	Not; Eligible	Secret; Room	Not; Eligible	Benoît; Senna	Not; Eligible	Thomas; Amélie; Senna; Benoît	Senna; Benoît	Not; Eligible	Not; Eligible	Exempt	Nominated	Evicted (Day 101)	
Thomas	Not in House	Not; Eligible	Not; Eligible	Chrismaëlle	Julie; Chrismaëlle	Not; Eligible	Anne-Krystel	Robin	Not; Eligible	Anne-Krystel; Bastien; Stéphanie; Maxime	Nominated	Amélie; Anne-Krystel	Amélie; Anne-Krystel	Nominated	Evicted (Day 94)		
Amélie	Not in House	Anti; Room	Anthony; Thomas	John	Exempt	Robin; Maxime	Exempt	Robin; Maxime	Not; Eligible	Anne Krystel; Bastien; Stéphanie; Maxime	Bastien; Benoît	Not; Eligible	Not; Eligible	Evicted (Day 87)			
Chrismaëlle	Not in House	Anti; Room	Anthony; Thomas	Alexandre	Not; Eligible	Benoît; Alexandre	Not; Eligible	Senna (x2); Benoît (x2)	Exempt	Anne-Krystel; Bastien; Stéphanie; Maxime	Nominated	Evicted (Day 73)					
Maxime	Not in House	Anti; Room	Anti; Room	Chrismaëlle	Nominated	Not; Eligible	Shine	Not; Eligible	Not; Eligible	Thomas; Amélie; Senna; Benoît	Evicted (Day 66)						
Charlotte	Not in House	Anthony; Ahmed	Anthony; John	John	Not; Eligible	Alexandre; Benoît	Not; Eligible	Senna; Benoît	Not; Eligible	Evicted (Day 59)							
Robin	Nominated	Nominated	Not; Eligible	Chrismaëlle	Julie; Anne-Krystel	Not; Eligible	Anne-Krystel	Nominated	Evicted (Day 52)								
Shine	Not in House	Ahmed; Anthony	John; Anthony	John	Not; Eligible	Benoît; Alexandre	Nominated	Evicted (Day 45)									
Alexandre	Not in House	Not; Eligible	Not; Eligible	Chrismaëlle	Julie; Coralie	Not; Eligible	Evicted (Day 38)										
Julie	Not in House	Anthony; Ahmed	Nominated	John	Not; Eligible	Maxime; Robin	Walked (Day 38)										
Coralie	Not in House	Ahmed; Anthony	Anthony; Thomas	John	Nominated	Evicted (Day 31)											
John	Not in House	Not; Eligible	Not; Eligible	Chrismaëlle	Evicted (Day 24)												
Anthony	Not in House	Not; Eligible	Not; Eligible	Evicted (Day 17)													
Ahmed	Not in House	Not; Eligible	Ejected (Day 10)														
Marion	Not in House	Walked (Day 5)															
Laura	Nominated	Evicted (Day 3)															
Notes		1, 2	3, 4	5	6, 7, 8	9, 10, 11	12, 13	14, 15	16, 17, 18	19	20, 21	22	23, 24	25	26	none	
Up for eviction	Benoît & Robin, Laura & Robin, Benoît & Laura	Benoît & Robin	Anthony; Julie; Thomas	Chrismaëlle; John	Coralie; Julie; Maxime	Alexandre; Benoît	Anne-Krystel; Bastien; Senna; Shine; Stéphanie	Benoît; Robin	Charlotte; Senna; Stéphanie	Anne-Krystel; Bastien; Maxime; Stéphanie	Benoît; Chrismaëlle; Senna; Thomas	Bastien	Amélie; Anne-Krystel	Bastien; Benoît; Senna; Stéphanie; Thomas	Anne-Krystel; Benoît; Senna; Stéphanie	All housemates	
Walked	none	Marion	none			Julie	none										
Ejected	none	Ahmed	none														
Evicted	Benoît & Robin; 47.48% to save	Benoît & Robin; 89% to save	Anthony; 27% to save	John; 48% to save	Coralie; 24% to save	Alexandre; 48% to save	Shine; 7% to save	Robin; 46.5% to save	Charlotte; 27% to save	Maxime; 19.68% to save	Chrismaëlle; 7% to save	Bastien; 70.5% to save	Amélie; 49% to save	Thomas; 11% to save	Anne-Krystel; 10% to save	Stéphanie; 11% to win	Bastien; 28% to win
Evicted	Benoît & Robin; 47.48% to save	Benoît & Robin; 89% to save	Anthony; 27% to save	John; 48% to save	Coralie; 24% to save	Alexandre; 48% to save	Shine; 7% to save	Robin; 46.5% to save	Charlotte; 27% to save	Maxime; 19.68% to save	Chrismaëlle; 7% to save	Bastien; 70.5% to save	Amélie; 49% to save	Thomas; 11% to save	Anne-Krystel; 10% to save	Senna; 29% to win	Benoît; 32% to win

=== Notes ===
- ^Note 1: In round one of nominations, the Anti-Room housemates, Amélie, Maxime and Chrismaelle, were exempt from nominations. With this exemption, they were given a mission to uncover "The Elected" (Ahmed, Anne-Krystel, and Julie). Should they pass their mission, all three Anti-Room housemates will enter the main house on day 10 and "The Elected" housemates will be evicted. Should they fail their mission, all three Anti-Room housemates will be evicted.
- ^Note 2: Initially in round one of nominations, only female housemates living in the actual house were going to nominate and only male housemates living in the actual house could be nominated. However, Robin revealed his secret. Following this, La Voix announced to the housemates that Robin and Benoit were nominated for eviction and that the viewers were voting to save or evict them as a pair. If Robin had not revealed his secret, the nominees would have been Anthony and Ahmed.
- ^Note 3: Before the second round of nominations, the housemates living in the main house had to vote for which of the Anti-Room housemates they wanted to save from nomination. The housemates chose to save Maxime meaning that Julie was nominated for eviction.
- ^Note 4: In round two of nominations, only the female housemates were allowed to nominate and only the male housemates could be nominated.
- ^Note 5: In round three of nominations, each housemate was asked to nominate one housemate of the opposite gender for eviction.
- ^Note 6: In round four of nominations, Maxime was automatically nominated for eviction by La Voix for revealing his secret.
- ^Note 7: In round four of nominations, only male housemates were allowed to nominate and only female housemates could be nominated.
- ^Note 8: Originally, Julie and Anne-Krystel received the most nominations and were to face eviction with Maxime. However, Coralie revealed clues to her secret and was therefore nominated with Maxime and Julie, who received the most nominations.
- ^Note 9: In round five of nominations, only the female housemates were allowed to nominate and only the male housemates could be nominated.
- ^Note 10: In round five of nominations, Senna was exempt and could not be nominated.
- ^Note 11: During the fifth round of nominations, Anne-Krystel and Bastien were both in the Secret room and could not nominate or be nominated.
- ^Note 12: In round six of nominations, Bastien and Senna were automatically nominated for eviction for revealing their secrets.
- ^Note 13: In round six of nominations, only male housemates were allowed to nominate and only female housemates could be nominated.
- ^Note 14: In round seven of nominations, only the female housemates were allowed to nominate and only the male housemates could be nominated.
- ^Note 15: In round seven of nominations, Senna had the power to remove one housemate from the nominations list and replace them with another. He chose to save himself and nominate Robin in his place.
- ^Note 16: In round eight of nominations, Senna was automatically nominated for eviction and was the only housemate permitted to nominate.
- ^Note 17: In round eight of nominations, Senna was automatically nominated for eviction and was the only housemate permitted to nominate.
- ^Note 18: In round eight of nominations, Chrismaëlle, as well as all male housemates apart from Senna, was exempt from nominations.
- ^Note 19: In round nine of nominations, all housemates had to nominate four of their fellow housemates to face eviction.
- ^Note 20: In round ten of nominations, only female housemates could nominate and only male housemates could be nominated.
- ^Note 21: In round ten of nominations, Chrismaëlle and Thomas both chose to be automatically nominated in order to see their significant others.
- ^Note 22: During round eleven of nominations, Bastien revealed his secret and was therefore automatically nominated for eviction by himself.
- ^Note 23: In round twelve of nominations, only male housemates could nominate and only female housemates could be nominated.
- ^Note 24: During round twelve of nominations, Benoit was in the Red room after having been fake evicted by Bastien.
- ^Note 25: In round thirteen of nominations, the housemates were initially going to nominate in pairs, however, because Benoit revealed Anne-Krystel's secret she was given an exemption while all other housemates were automatically nominated for eviction.
- ^Note 26: Bastien having a place in finale acquired, he is the only one not to be to nominate.

== Nominations : Results ==
Weeks	Nominated	Evicted
Week 0	Benoît & Robin (47.48%), Laura & Robin (39.60%), Benoît & Laura (12.93%)	Laura
Week 1	Benoît & Robin (89%)	Marion (Walked), Ahmed (Ejected)
Week 2	Julie (41%), Thomas (32%), Anthony (27%)	Anthony
Week 3	Chrismaëlle (52%), John (48%)	John
Week 4	Julie (40%), Maxime (36%), Coralie (24%)	Coralie
Week 5	Benoît (52%), Alexandre (48%)	Julie (Walked), Alexandre
Week 6	Stéphanie (31%), Senna (28%), Bastien (23%), Anne-Krystel (11%), Shine (7%)	Shine
Week 7	Benoît (53.5%), Robin (46.5%)	Robin
Week 8	Senna (43%), Stéphanie (30%), Charlotte (27%)	Charlotte
Week 9	Bastien (38%), Stéphanie (22%), Anne-Krystel (19.92%), Maxime (19.68%)	Maxime
Week 10	Senna (57%), Benoît (25%), Thomas (11%), Chrismaëlle (7%)	Chrismaëlle
Week 11	Bastien (70.5%)	—
Week 12	Anne-Krystel (51%), Amélie (49%)	Amélie
Week 13	Senna (35%), Bastien (23%), Benoît (17%), Stéphanie (14%), Thomas (11%)	Thomas
Week 14	Stéphanie (33%), Senna (31%), Benoît (26%), Anne-Krystel (10%)	Anne-Krystel
Final	Benoît (32%), Senna (29%), Bastien (28%), Stéphanie (11%)	Senna, Bastien, Stéphanie

== Prime-Time Ratings ==
Like every year the first prime-time was at 08.45pm.

Show N°	Day & Hour	Viewers	Ratings Share
1	Friday, July 9 8:45 p.m-11:30 p.m	4,257,000	25.5%
2	Friday, July 16 10:25 p.m-12:15 a.m	2,900,000	24.5%
3	Friday, July 23 10:25 p.m-12:15 a.m	3,000,000	26.9%
4	Friday, July 30 10:25 p.m-12:15 a.m	2,600,000	23.5%
5	Friday, August 6 10:25 p.m-12:15 a.m	2,500,000	24.2%
6	Friday, August 13 10:25 p.m-12:15 a.m	2,300,000	20.1%
7	Friday, August 20 10:25 p.m-12:15 a.m	2,400,000	20.4%
8	Friday, August 27 10:25 p.m-12:15 a.m	3,000,000	23%
9	Friday, September 3 10:25 p.m-12:15 a.m	2,300,000	25.4%
10	Friday, September 10 10:25 p.m-12:15 a.m	2,900,000	23%
11	Friday, September 17 10:25 p.m-12:15 a.m	3,369,000	30.1%
12	Friday, September 24 10:25 p.m-12:15 a.m	3,480,000	24.8%
13	Friday, October 1 10:25 p.m-12:15 a.m	3,512,000	28.5%
14	Friday, October 8 10:25 p.m-12:15 a.m	3,051,000	24.7%
15	Friday, October 15 10:25 p.m-12:15 a.m	3,082,000	25.6%
16	Friday, October 22 10:25 p.m-12:15 a.m	3,456,000	26.7%
