= L'Île des vérités =

- Presented by: Alexandre "Alex" Taliercio (starting season 2)
- Country of origin: France
- No. of seasons: 4
- No. of episodes: 108

Production
- Production locations: Moorea (season 1); Tahiti (Seasons 2 to 4)

Original release
- Network: NRJ 12
- Release: December 5, 2011 – November 14, 2014

L'Île des vérités is a French reality television series broadcast on French music and entertainment specialty channel NRJ 12.

The debut was on 5 December 2011. A second season followed on 5 November 2012 with a third starting on 26 August 2013 and a fourth 25 August 2014. Season 2 also had an offshoot called L'Île des vérités 2, Le Mag, but was suspended after just one season because of poor viewership figures. Starting season 2, the show was hosted by Alexandre Taliercio.

The program took Au paradis, leur vie va basculer meaning in paradise their lives would be tipped over, as their activities included a great number of voluntary and benevolent acts in what is specified in season 1 as Moorea island in French Polynesia. In later seasons, a more general Tahiti is used.

== Seasons ==
=== Season 1 (2011-2012) ===
Seven participants (4 guys and 3 girls) joined later by Steven and Iman are entrusted by various voluntary and benevolent tasks, interspersed with various conflicts and love affairs all guided by Rodo their guide to the island of Moorea island in French Polynesia. Guest invitees also render visits to the group named the Robinsons.

Participants

- Ornella (best friend)
- Martika Caringella (Luana, mother)
- Julia Flabat (father)
- Florent Ré (ex-fiancé)
- Victor (person)
- Bea Kurtis (leaves show meeting no one)
- Medi (sister)
- Steven (only episodes 14 to 17)
- Iman (starting episode 15)

Guests

- Magloire, personality
- Shauna Sand, playmate
- Giuseppe

=== Season 2 (2012-2013) ===
Ten individuals (5 guys and 5 girls) called residents instead of Robinsons take on more challenges funding and building a house for the children of the island in conjunction with the association Puna Reo Piha'e'ina supervised by the head of the project Gabriel. "Moorea" is dropped in favour of a more general Tahiti or Temae. The new guide Alexandre "Alex" Taliercio replaces season 1 guide Rodo, who nevertheless renders a visit during the show. Second season included 40 episodes.

Participants

- Aurélie Dotremont, (Geoffrey's ex)
- Geoffrey Vandeloise (Aurélie's ex)
- Cindy Stoessel (Curtis, a suitor)
- Dimitri Cohen, (ex-best friend)
- Pietro Cistulli (ex-fiancé)
- Samir Benzema (starting episode 4; ex friend)
- Florent Saugrain (leaves having met no one)
- Inès Lee, (starting episode 4; sister)
- Léa Zeliah (Kerredine Soltani, music producer)
- Priscilla Lya (ex friend)
- Anita Dehaini (episodes 13 to 40)
- Stéphanie (episodes 28 and 29)
- Curtis (episodes 37 to 40)

Guests

- Marlène Mourreau, television host
- Willy Denzey, singer
- Quentin Elias, singer and model

=== Season 3 (2013) ===
A third season in Tahiti with returning host from season 2 Alexandre "Alex" Taliercio with nominal contributions by season 1 guide Rodo. The team continues on building and humanitarian mission for association Puna Reo Piha'e'ina, with the aim of building two new residences for the island children.

Participants

- Manon Marsault (cousin)
- Laura Giraudi (mother)
- Malika Bouhafs (Monira's sister)
- Monira Bouhafs (Malika's sister)
- Beverly Bello (Bruno's ex)
- Julien Bert (best friend)
- Raphaël Pépin (Aurélie Van Daelen's ex)
- Aurélie Van Daelen (Raphaël's ex, starting episode 2)
- Edeen (brother, episodes 1 to 17)
- Alice (ex, episodes 5 to 26)
- Ju Galendo (friend, starting episode 5)
- Zarko Stojanovic (friend of Caroline Boutier, starting episode 11)
- Zelko Stojanovic (friend of Caroline Boutier, starting episode 11)
- Astrid Poubel (not specified, starting episode 28)

Guests

- Organiz, singers (episodes 3 to 7)
- Jeremstar, blogger (episodes 14 to 21)
- Danièle and Béatrice, Presenters of programs (episodes 25 to 31)
- Monia (of Whatfor), singer (starting episode 46)

=== Season 4, 2014) ===
Alex (Alexandre Taliercio) returns for a third time. A new benevolent project, Ismael, occupies the residents of the season. The fourth season commenced 25 August 2014.

Participants

- Tatiana-Laurens Delarue (unspecified, episodes 1 to 36, returning with episode 42)
- Xavier Delarue (Maeva's ex)
- Maeva (Xavier's ex, starting episode 3)
- Stan (Auréa's best friend)
- Céline Dast (Philippe's best friend)
- Sarah Benmamar (unspecified)
- Chloey Bourgeois (unspecified)
- Julian Fourreaux (Left by his father, episodes 1 to 44)
- Yoan Del Heyos (Alizée's ex, episodes 1 to 33)
- Manu Sempere (Quits without finding any one, episodes 1 to 8)
- Beverly Bello (unspecified, episodes 12 to 31, returns episode 35)
- Mike Mescudi (hasn't seen his mother since childhood, episodes 12 to 34)
- Aurélie Dotremont (unspecified, starting episode 20)
- Benjamin Henou (unspecified, starting episode 30)
- Boris Guichet (unspecified, starting episode 36)

Guests

- Alexandra Canto and Marjorie Parascandola (both of French band L5), singer (episodes 5 to 10)
- Jessy Matador, singer (episodes 13 to 25)
