= Loana =

Loana may refer to:

== People ==
- Loana Berbedj, contributor to the French financial newspaper Les Echos
- Loana Bernhard, member of the Argentine team in the 2020 South American Under-20 Women's Football Championship squads
- Loana Bibeme, goalscorer for the Cameroon women's national under-20 football team at the 2026 African U-20 Women's World Cup qualification
- Loana Biffe, Member of the Italy women's national artistic gymnastics team at the 1978 World Artistic Gymnastics Championships
- Loana Bishop, competitor in the 1959 Wimbledon Championships – Women's doubles
- Loana Bohl, Miss Tahiti 1986
- Loana Capelli, Italian gold medal winner at the Boules sports at the 2009 World Games – Women's raffa doubles
- Loana Alejandra Diaz, 2nd runner-up in Sports & Fitness at Miss World Panamá 2022
- Loana Garraud, co-author of the 2023 paper "Ecolabel certification in multi-zone marine protected areas can incentivize sustainable fishing practices and offset the costs of fishing effort displacement."
- Loana Huynh, media researcher who appeared on the 2004 reality TV show Mad Mad House
- Loana Lecomte (born 8 August 1999), a French cross-country and mountain bike cyclist
- Loana Morrison, a Conservative Party candidate for the ward of Faraday in the 2018 Southwark London Borough Council election
- Loana P. Nascimento, co-author of a paper "Feeding biology of Boddaert's tropical racer, Mastigodryas boddaerti (Serpentes, Colubridae) from the Brazilian Amazon"
- Loana Petrucciani (30 August 1977 – March 2026), a French television personality and singer
- Loana Katharina Radecki, Miss Germany 1983
- Loana S. Rider, co-author of the paper "Cauda Equina and Conus Medullaris Syndromes" relating to saddle anesthesia
- Loana "Loli" Ruiz, professional dancer on Bailando 2021
- Loana Theresa Schrempp (born 2001), daughter of Jürgen E. Schrempp
- Loana Tito, editor of the 2008 article "Sparse Approximate Solutions to Semidefinite Programs"
- Loana dP Valencia, singer, photographer, and writer for the magazine Esto no tiene nombre
- Loana Viera, writer for the Argentine online newspaper Infobae

== Fictional characters ==
- Loana, a character played by Carole Landis in the 1940 film One Million B.C.
- Loana, a character played by Raquel Welch in the 1966 film One Million Years B.C.
- Loana, Kal-el's wife in Superman's fantasy in the 2004 Justice League Unlimited story "For the Man Who Has Everything"

== Places ==
- Loana, a small river that joins the Melezzo Orientale at Malesco, Italy
- Mt Loana, former location of the Central Area Command (RAAF) until May 1940
- Noha-lia-loana, a village in Bobete, Lesotho
- Val Loana, a valley in the Lepontine Alps

== Other ==
- Macrochlamys loana, a type of slug
- La misteriosa fiamma della regina Loana, a 2004 novel by Umberto Eco
- La misteriosa musica della Regina Loana, a 2019 album by Gianluigi Trovesi and Gianni Coscia
