= Danse avec les stars season 7 =

Danse avec les stars
- Season 7
- Celebrity winner: Laurent Maistret
- Professional winner: Denitsa Ikonomova
- No. of episodes: 10

Release
- Original network: TF1
- Original release: 15 October – 16 December 2016

Season chronology
- ← Previous; Season 6 Next → Season 8

The seventh season of the French version of Strictly Come Dancing started on 15 October 2016 on TF1. It was hosted by Sandrine Quétier and Laurent Ournac. Before the end of the sixth season, TF1 announced the renewal of the show for a seventh season in 2016.

== Participants ==
Celebrity	Occupation / known for	Professional partner	Status
Olivier Minne	Fort Boyard presenter	Katrina Patchett	Eliminated 1st on 22 October 2016
Kamel the Magician	Magician	Emmanuelle Berne	Eliminated 2nd on 29 October 2016
Sylvie Tellier	Miss France 2002 & Miss France Director	Christophe Licata	Eliminated 3rd on 5 November 2016
Julien Lepers	Television & radio broadcaster	Silvia Notargiacomo	Eliminated 4th on 10 November 2016
Valérie Damidot	D&CO presenter	Christian Millette	Eliminated 5th on 19 November 2016
Caroline Receveur	Television & web personality	Maxime Dereymez	Eliminated 6th on 26 November 2016
Florent Mothe	Singer, actor, & musician	Candice Pascal	Eliminated 7th on 4 December 2016
Karine Ferri	Television presenter	Yann-Alrick Mortreuil; Christophe Licata (Week 6-7)	Eliminated 8th on 10 December 2016
Artus	Comedian	Marie Denigot	Third Place on 16 December 2016
Camille Lou	Singer & actress	Grégoire Lyonnet	Second Place on 16 December 2016
Laurent Maistret	Koh-Lanta winner	Denitsa Ikonomova	Winners on 16 December 2016

Laurent Maistret

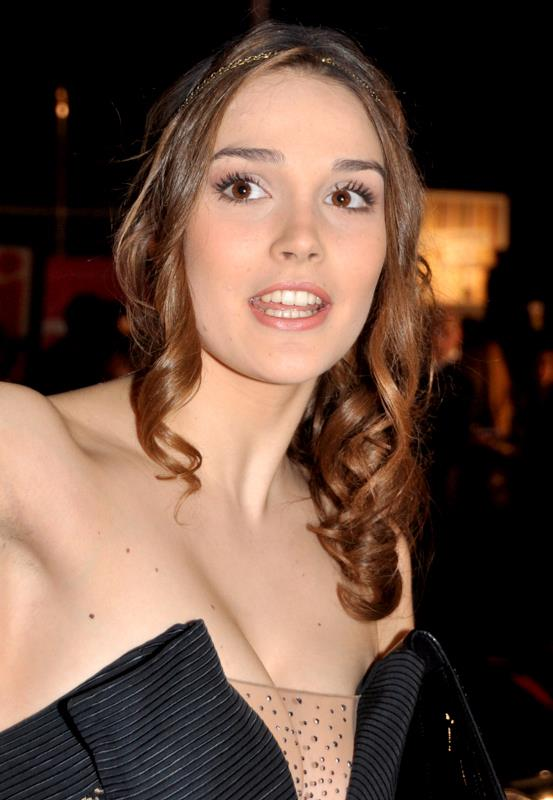
Camille Lou

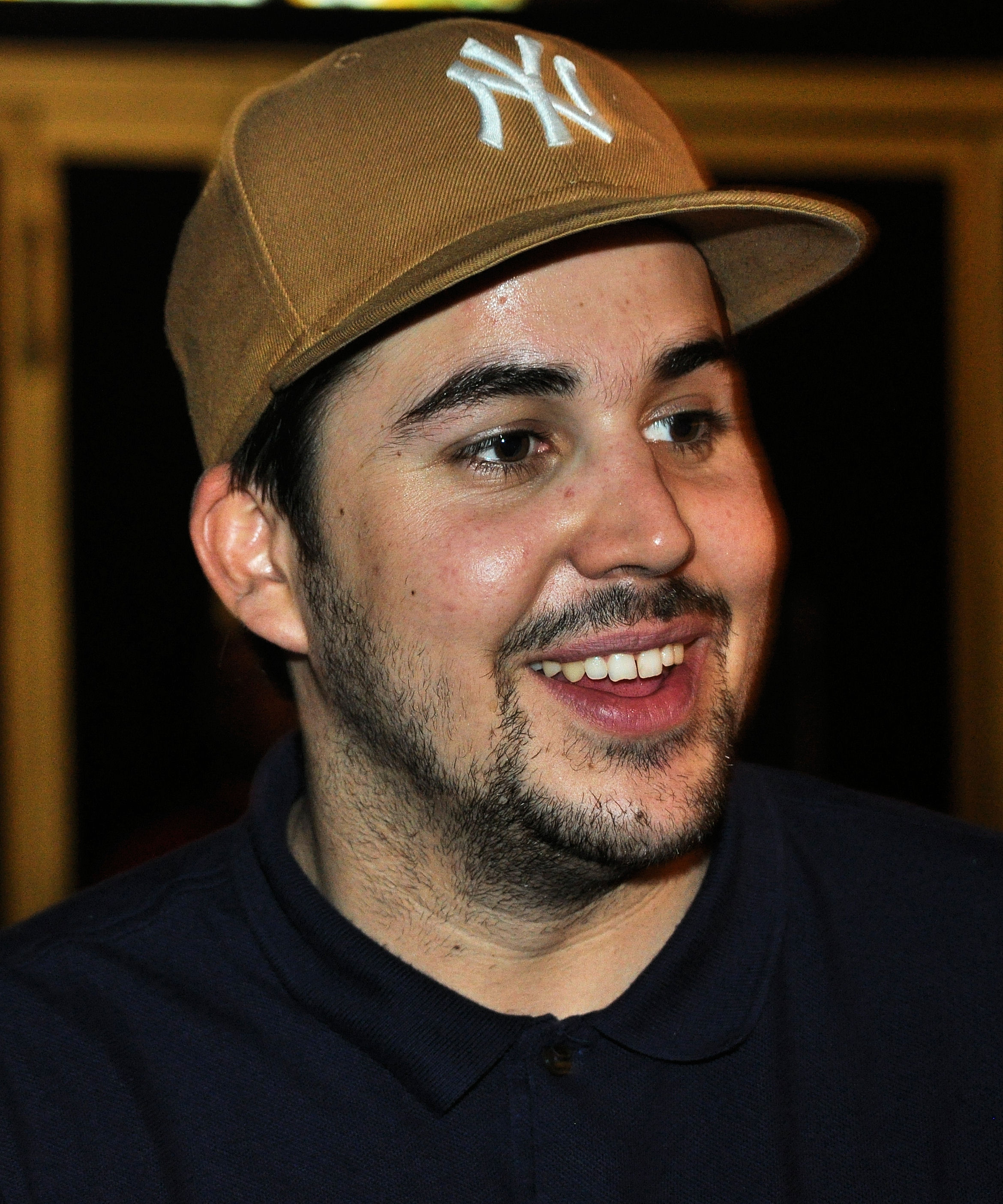
Artus

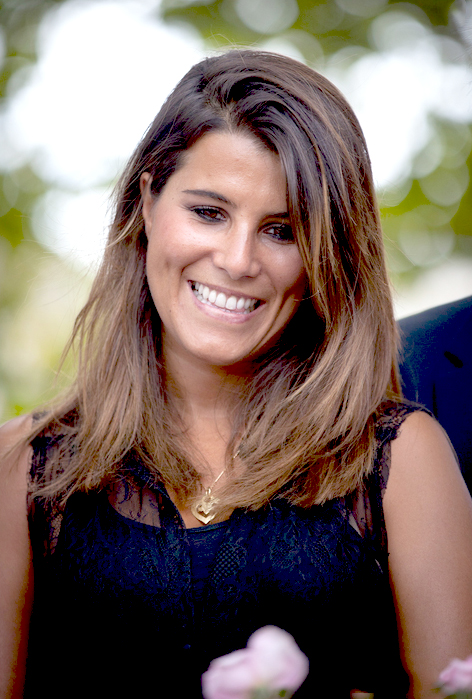
Karine Ferri

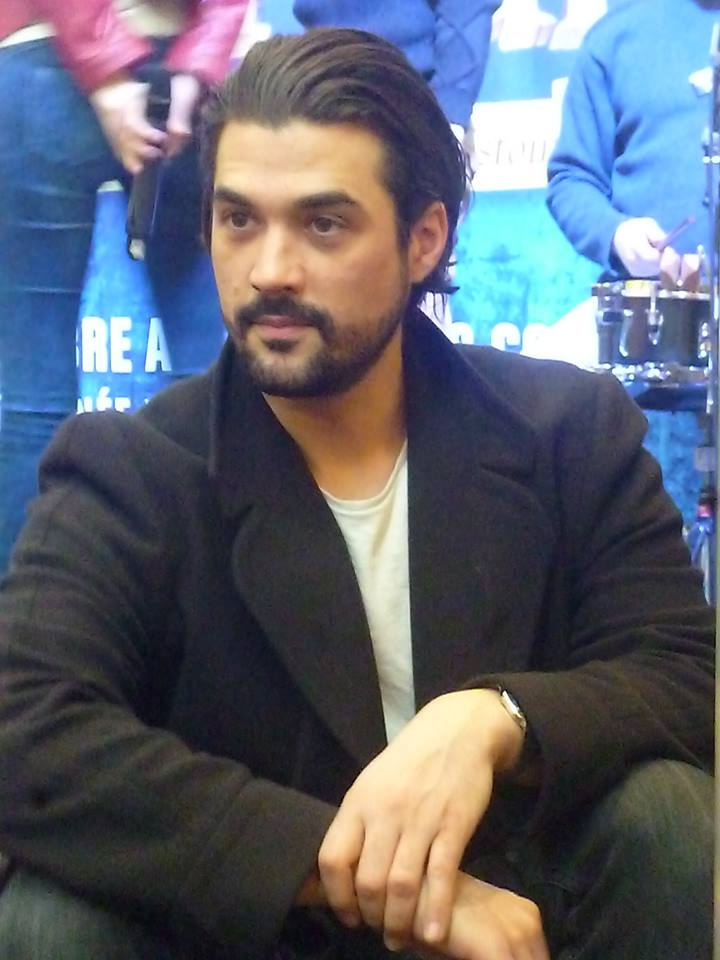
Florent Mothe

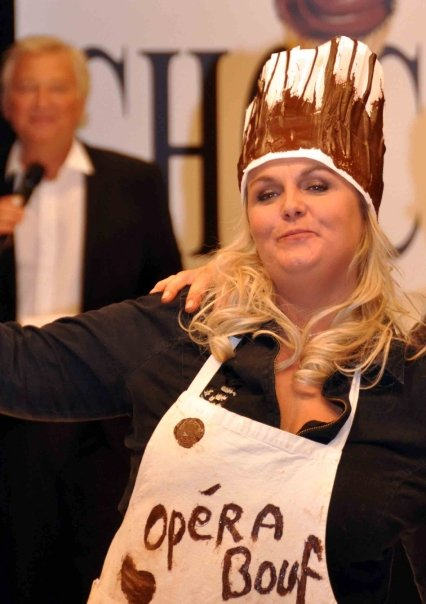
Valérie Damidot

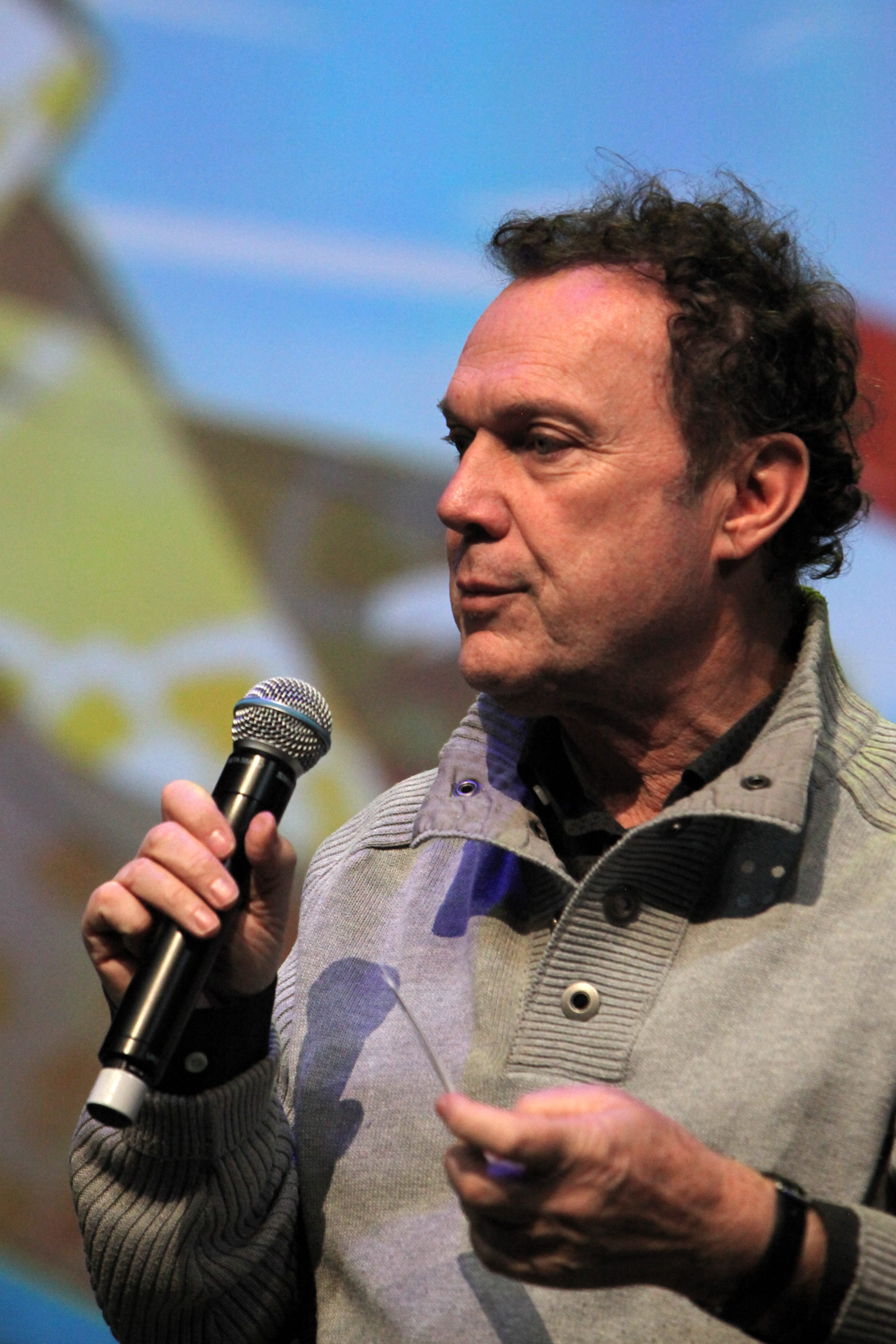
Julien Lepers

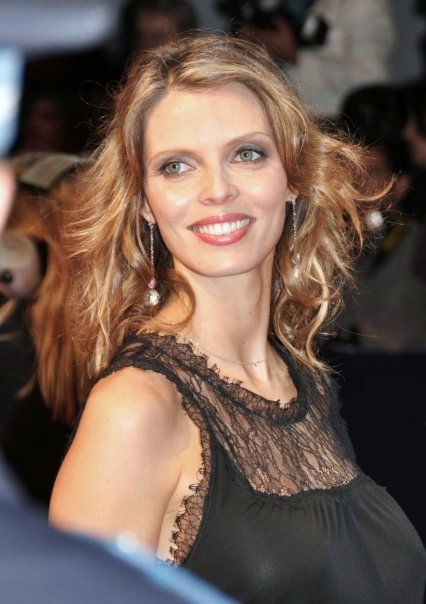
Sylvie Tellier

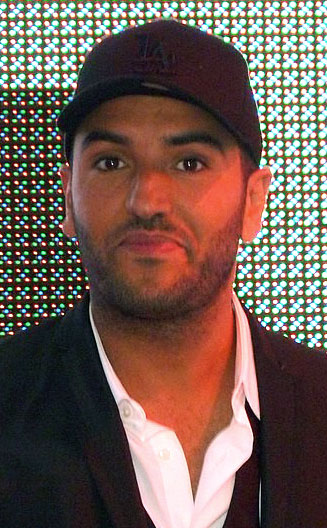
Kamel le Magicien

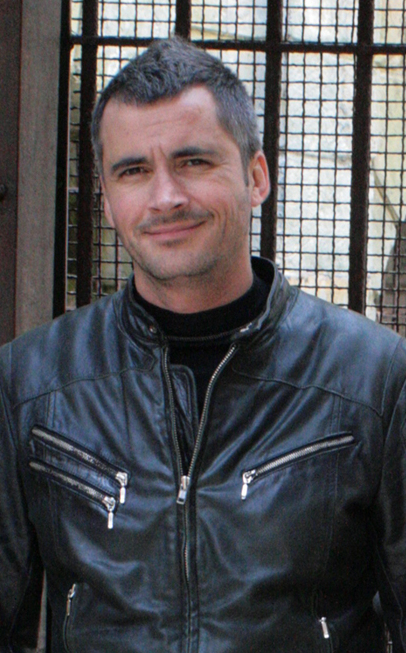
Olivier Minne

== Scoring ==
Team	Place	1	2	1+2	3	4	5	6	7	8	9	10
Laurent & Denitsa	1	30	33	63	43	68 + 45 = 113	54	70	70 + 70 = 140	74 + 71 = 145	56 + 75 = 131	75 + 77 = 152
Camille & Grégoire	2	31	28	59	41	68 + 40 = 108	52	60	69 + 73 = 142	72 + 74 = 146	56 + 75 = 131	74 + 78 = 152
Artus & Marie	3	29	28	57	33	58 + 25 = 82	50	69 + 10 = 79	59 + 73 = 132	68 + 67 = 135	56 + 67 = 123	72 + 75 = 147
Karine & Yann-Alrick	4	25	30	55	39	50 + 15 = 65	46	61	56 + 55 = 111	63 + 64 = 127	51 +68 = 119	
Florent & Candice	5	31	31	62	37	69 + 30 = 99	41	74	53 + 65 = 118	71 + 69 = 140		
Caroline & Maxime	6	33	30	63	38	61 + 35 = 96	49	72	66 + 65 = 131			
Valérie & Christian	7	25	25	50	28	55 + 10 = 65	45	52				
Julien & Silvia	8	20	26	46	29	45 + 5 = 50	39					
Sylvie & Christophe	9	29	31	60	37	62 + 20 = 82						
Kamel & Emmanuelle	10	21	30	51	34							
Olivier & Katrina	11	27	22	49								

Red numbers indicate the couples with the lowest score for each week.
Blue numbers indicate the couples with the highest score for each week.
indicates the couples eliminated that week.
indicates the returning couple that finished in the bottom two.
indicates the winning couple.
indicates the runner-up couple.
indicates the third place couple.

=== Notes of each couples ===
Couple	Total	10	9	8	7	6	5	4	3	2	1	Average
Laurent & Denitsa	97	20	57	14	5	1	—N/a					8.9
Camille & Grégoire	97	23	43	20	9	1	1	—N/a				8.8
Artus & Marie	97	16	29	30	13	7	2	—N/a				8.3
Karine & Yann-Alrick	81	—N/a	11	37	22	5	5	1	—N/a			7.5
Florent & Candice	67	4	26	17	13	5	2	—N/a				8.1
Caroline & Maxime	51	2	17	19	11	2	—N/a					8.1
Valérie & Christian	35	—N/a		7	15	6	5	2	—N/a			6.6
Julien & Silvia	27	—N/a		2	7	6	10	2	—N/a			5.9
Sylvie & Christophe	21	—N/a		13	7	1	—N/a					7.6
Kamel & Emmanuelle	13	—N/a	1	2	3	5	1	1	—N/a			6.5
Olivier & Katrina	8	—N/a			4	2	1	1	—N/a			6.1
Total	594	65	184	161	109	41	27	7	0	0	0	8

== Averages ==
This table only counts dances scored on the traditional 40-point scale. Starting in week 4, both technical and artistic scores were tallied.

Rank by average	Place	Couple	Total	Number of dances	Average
1	1	Laurent & Denitsa	866	14	35.71
2	2	Camille & Grégoire	851	14	35.09
3	3	Artus & Marie	804	14	33.15
4	6	Caroline & Maxime	414	8	32.47
5	5	Florent & Candice	541	10	32.30
6	9	Sylvie & Christophe	159	4	30.29
7	4	Karine & Yann-Alrick	608	12	30.02
8	7	Valérie & Christian	230	6	26.29
9	10	Kamel & Emmanuelle	85	3	26.15
10	11	Olivier & Katrina	49	2	24.50
11	8	Julien & Silvia	159	5	23.56

== Highest and lowest scoring performances ==
The best and worst performances in each dance according to the judges' marks were as follows (starting in week 4, an average of the technical and artistic scores was used):

Dance	Best dancer	Best score	Worst dancer	Worst score
Cha-Cha-Cha	Laurent Maistret	37.5	Julien Lepers	20
Samba	Artus	33.5	Valérie Damidot	22.4
Quickstep	Laurent Maistret; Camille Lou	37.5	Valérie Damidot	25
Rumba	Laurent Maistret	37.33	Valérie Damidot	25
Foxtrot	Camille Lou	37	Julien Lepers	23.2
Tango	Caroline Receveur	33	Valérie Damidot	27.5
Jive	Artus; Camille Lou	34.5	Sylvie Tellier	29.6
Waltz	Camille Lou	37	Julien Lepers	26
Contemporary	Artus	37.3	Kamel le Magicien	27.2
Argentine Tango	Camille Lou	34.7	Sylvie Tellier	31
Paso Doble	Laurent Maistret	38.5	Julien Lepers	22.5
Charleston	Camille Lou	34	Camille Lou	34
Jazz	Karine Ferri	30.5	Karine Ferri	30.5
Mambo	Laurent Maistret	35	Laurent Maistret	35
Salsa	Karine Ferri	34	Artus	29.5
Flamenco	Karine Ferri	27.5	Karine Ferri	27.5
Jazz Broadway	Camille Lou	39	Camille Lou	36.5
Bollywood	Florent Mothe	35.5	Florent Mothe	35.5

== Couples' highest and lowest scoring performances ==
According to the traditional 40-point scale (starting in week 4, an average of the technical and artistic score was used):

Couples	Highest Scoring Dances	Lowest Scoring Dances
Laurent & Denitsa	Paso Doble (38.5)	Samba (30)
Camille & Grégoire	Jazz Broadway (39)	Samba (28)
Artus & Marie	Paso Doble (37.5)	Cha-Cha-Cha (26.4)
Karine & Yann-Alrick	Salsa; Waltz (34)	Cha-Cha-Cha; Samba (25)
Florent & Candice	Contemporary (37)	Paso Doble (26.5)
Caroline & Maxime	Quickstep (36)	Rumba (30)
Valérie & Christian	Waltz (30)	Samba (22.4)
Julien & Silvia	Waltz; Quickstep (26)	Cha-Cha-Cha (20)
Sylvie & Christophe	Rumba; Argentine Tango (31)	Cha-Cha-Cha (29)
Kamel & Emmanuelle	Jive (30)	Cha-Cha-Cha (21)
Olivier & Katrina	Foxtrot (27)	Cha-Cha-Cha (22)

== Styles, scores and songs ==
=== Week 1 ===
Individual judges' scores in the chart below (given in parentheses) are listed in this order from left to right: Fauve Hautot, Jean-Marc Généreux, Marie-Claude Pietragalla, Chris Marques.

Running order

Couple	Score	Style	Music
Sylvie & Christophe	29 (8,7,7,7)	Cha-Cha-Cha	Let's Get Loud - Jennifer Lopez
Laurent & Denitsa	30 (8,7,8,7)	Samba	Lean On - Major Lazer, DJ Snake Ft MØ
Valérie & Christian	25 (7,6,7,5)	Quickstep	Bewitched Theme - The Hit Crew
Karine & Yann-Alrick	25 (7,5,7,6)	Cha-Cha-Cha	This Is What You Came For - Calvin Harris Ft Rihanna
Artus & Marie	29 (8,6,8,7)	Quickstep	Les Limites - Julien Doré
Camille & Grégoire	31 (8,7,8,8)	Rumba	Purple Rain - Prince Ft The Revolution
Olivier & Katrina	27 (7,6,7,7)	Foxtrot	I Still Haven't Found What I'm Looking For - U2
Caroline & Maxime	33 (8,8,9,8)	Tango	I Kissed a Girl - Katy Perry
Kamel & Emmanuelle	21 (6,5,6,4)	Cha-Cha-Cha	J'ai cherché - Amir Haddad
Julien & Silvia	20 (5,5,6,4)	Cha-Cha-Cha	Can't Stop the Feeling! - Justin Timberlake
Florent & Candice	31 (9,8,9,5)	Rumba	The Hills - The Weeknd

=== Week 2 : Personal Story Week ===
Individual judges' scores in the chart below (given in parentheses) are listed in this order from left to right: Fauve Hautot, Jean-Marc Généreux, Marie-Claude Pietragalla, Chris Marques.

Running order

Couple	Score		Style	Music	Result
Couple	Week 2	Week 1+2	Style	Music	Result
Sylvie & Christophe	31 (8,8,8,7)	60	Rumba	T'en va pas - Elsa	Safe
Valérie & Christian	25 (6,7,7,5)	50	Rumba	She - Elvis Costello	Safe
Camille & Grégoire	28 (7,5,8,8)	59	Samba	Bootylicious - Destiny's Child	Safe
Artus & Marie	28 (7,6,9,6)	57	Rumba	La solitudine - Laura Pausini	Safe
Karine & Yann-Alrick	30 (8,7,8,7)	55	Jive	I'll Be There for You - The Rembrandts	Safe
Julien & Silvia	26 (7,6,8,5)	46	Waltz	Hero - Mariah Carey	Last to be called Safe
Caroline & Maxime	30 (9,6,8,7)	63	Rumba	Nuit magique - Catherine Lara	Safe
Florent & Candice	31 (8,7,9,7)	62	Jive	Baila - Alliage	Safe
Olivier & Katrina	22 (7,5,6,4)	49	Cha-Cha-Cha	Sing Hallelujah - Dr. Alban	Eliminated
Kamel & Emmanuelle	30 (9,7,8,6)	51	Jive	Mambo No. 5 - Lou Bega	Safe
Laurent & Denitsa	33 (9,8,9,7)	63	Waltz	(Everything I Do) I Do It for You - Bryan Adams	Safe

=== Week 3 : Spectators Week ===
Individual judges' scores in the chart below (given in parentheses) are listed in this order from left to right: Fauve Hautot, Jean-Marc Généreux, Marie-Claude Pietragalla, Chris Marques.

Running order

Couple	Score			Style	Music	Result
Couple	by jury	by spectators	Total	Style	Music	Result
Valérie & Christian	20 (5,5,6,4)	8	28	Samba	On the Floor - Jennifer Lopez ft. Pitbull	Safe
Laurent & Denitsa	34 (9,8,9,8)	9	43	Contemporary	Papaoutai - Stromae	Safe
Sylvie & Christophe	30 (8,7,8,7)	7	37	Jive	Le Banana Split - Lio	Safe
Florent & Candice	28 (7,6,8,7)	9	37	Waltz	Unchained Melody - The Righteous Brothers	Safe
Artus & Marie	25 (6,6,7,6)	8	33	Cha-Cha-Cha	Boogie Wonderland - Earth, Wind & Fire	Safe
Camille & Grégoire	32 (9,7,8,8)	9	41	Contemporary	Iron - Woodkid	Safe
Caroline & Maxime	29 (7,7,8,7)	9	38	Cha-Cha-Cha	Don't Be So Shy - Imany	Safe
Kamel & Emmanuelle	26 (7,6,7,6)	8	34	Contemporary	Là-bas - Jean-Jacques Goldman & Sirima	Eliminated
Julien & Silvia	23 (6,5,7,5)	6	29	Foxtrot	Supreme - Robbie Williams	Last to be called Safe
Karine & Yann-Alrick	30 (8,7,8,7)	9	39	Rumba	Les yeux de la mama - Kendji Girac	Safe

=== Week 4 : Double-score Showdown ===
Individual judges' scores in the chart below (given in parentheses) are listed in this order from left to right: Fauve Hautot, Jean-Marc Généreux, Marie-Claude Pietragalla, Chris Marques.

Running order

Couple	Results			Style	Music	Result
Couple	Artistic	Technical	Total	Style	Music	Result
Karine & Yann-Alrick	28 (7,7,7,7)	22 (6,5,7,4)	50	Samba	Sapés comme jamais - Maître Gims Ft Niska	Safe
Sylvie & Christophe	32 (8,8,8,8)	30 (8,8,8,6)	62	Argentine Tango	Can't Feel My Face - The Weeknd	Eliminated
Laurent & Denitsa	35 (8,9,10,8)	33 (9,7,9,8)	68	Jive	Can't Hold Us - Macklemore & Ryan Lewis Ft Ray Dalton	Safe
Artus & Marie	31 (8,7,9,7)	27 (7,7,8,5)	58	Paso Doble	Run the World (Girls) - Beyoncé	Safe
Caroline & Maxime	29 (7,7,7,8)	32 (9,8,7,8)	61	Foxtrot	Encore un soir - Celine Dion	Safe
Florent & Candice	36 (9,9,10,8)	33 (9,8,9,7)	69	Argentine Tango	I've Seen That Face Before - Grace Jones	Safe
Julien & Silvia	25 (7,6,7,5)	20 (5,5,6,4)	45	Paso Doble	Bad - Michael Jackson	Last to be called Safe
Camille & Grégoire	37 (10,9,10,8)	31 (8,8,8,7)	68	Charleston	I Got a Woman - Ray Charles (Remix Rudedog)	Safe
Valérie & Christian	29 (8,8,7,6)	26 (7,7,7,5)	55	Tango	El Tango de Roxanne – Ewan McGregor, José Feliciano, Jacek Koman	Safe
Cha-Cha-Cha Relay
Laurent & Denitsa	+ 45		113	Cha-Cha-Cha	Medley (Daddy Cool, Ma Baker, Rivers of Babylon, Rasputin) – Boney M.	
Camille & Grégoire	+ 40		108	Cha-Cha-Cha	Medley (Daddy Cool, Ma Baker, Rivers of Babylon, Rasputin) – Boney M.	
Caroline & Maxime	+ 35		96	Cha-Cha-Cha	Medley (Daddy Cool, Ma Baker, Rivers of Babylon, Rasputin) – Boney M.	
Florent & Candice	+ 30		99	Cha-Cha-Cha	Medley (Daddy Cool, Ma Baker, Rivers of Babylon, Rasputin) – Boney M.	
Artus & Marie	+ 25		83	Cha-Cha-Cha	Medley (Daddy Cool, Ma Baker, Rivers of Babylon, Rasputin) – Boney M.	
Sylvie & Christophe	+ 20		82	Cha-Cha-Cha	Medley (Daddy Cool, Ma Baker, Rivers of Babylon, Rasputin) – Boney M.	
Karine & Yann-Alrick	+ 15		65	Cha-Cha-Cha	Medley (Daddy Cool, Ma Baker, Rivers of Babylon, Rasputin) – Boney M.	
Valérie & Christian	+ 10		65	Cha-Cha-Cha	Medley (Daddy Cool, Ma Baker, Rivers of Babylon, Rasputin) – Boney M.	
Julien & Silvia	+ 5		50	Cha-Cha-Cha	Medley (Daddy Cool, Ma Baker, Rivers of Babylon, Rasputin) – Boney M.	

=== Week 5 : Judges' Week ===
Individual judges' scores in the chart below (given in parentheses) are listed in this order from left to right: Fauve Hautot, Jean-Marc Généreux, Shy'm, Chris Marques.

Running order

Couple	Results			Style	Music	Coached by	Result
Couple	Artistic	Technical	Total	Style	Music	Coached by	Result
Camille & Grégoire	27 (X,9,10,8)	25 (X,8,9,8)	52	Argentine Tango	Santa María (Del Buen Ayre) - Gotan Project	Fauve Hautot	Safe
Laurent & Denitsa	27 (9,X,10,8)	27 (9,X,9,9)	54	Paso Doble	O Verona - Craig Armstrong	Jean-Marc Généreux	Safe
Valérie & Christian	24 (8,8,8,X)	21 (7,7,7,X)	45	Waltz	I Have Nothing - Whitney Houston	Chris Marques	Safe
Caroline & Maxime	25 (8,9,X,8)	24 (8,8,X,8)	49	Jive	Happy - Pharrell Williams	Shy'm	Safe
Julien & Silvia	20 (7,X,8,5)	19 (7,X,7,5)	39	Quickstep	It's Not Unusual - Tom Jones	Jean-Marc Généreux	Eliminated
Artus & Marie	27 (10,9,X,8)	23 (8,8,X,7)	50	Foxtrot	Toute la pluie tombe sur moi - Sacha Distel	Shy'm	Safe
Florent & Candice	21 (7,7,7,X)	20 (7,6,7,X)	41	Samba	Duele el Corazón - Enrique Iglesias Ft Wisin	Chris Marques	Last to be called Safe
Karine & Yann-Alrick	23 (X,8,8,7)	23 (X,8,8,7)	46	Contemporary	Christine - Christine and the Queens	Fauve Hautot	Safe

=== Week 6 : Ladies' Night ===
Individual judges' scores in the chart below (given in parentheses) are listed in this order from left to right: Fauve Hautot, Jean-Marc Généreux, Marie-Claude Pietragalla, Chris Marques.

Running order

Couple	Results			Style	Music	Result
Couple	Artistic	Technical	Total	Style	Music	Result
Karine & Christophe	31 (8,8,8,7)	30 (8,8,8,6)	61	Jazz	Flashdance... What a Feeling - Irene Cara	Safe
Laurent & Denitsa	36 (9,9,10,8)	34 (9,8,9,8)	70	Rumba	Lettre à France - Michel Polnareff	Safe
Valérie & Christian	29 (8,7,7,7)	23 (6,6,7,4)	52	Cha-Cha-Cha	I Will Survive - Gloria Gaynor	Eliminated
Caroline & Maxime	35 (9,9,9,8)	37 (10,9,9,9)	72	Quickstep	You're the One That I Want - John Travolta Ft Olivia Newton-John	Safe
Florent & Candice	38 (10,9,10,9)	36 (9,9,9,9)	74	Contemporary	U-Turn (Lili) - AaRON	Safe
Artus & Marie	36 (9,9,10,8)	33 (9,8,9,7)	69	Jive	You Never Can Tell - Chuck Berry	Safe
Camille & Grégoire	32 (8,8,9,7)	28 (7,7,8,6)	60	Cha-Cha-Cha	I Follow Rivers - Lykke Li	Last to be called Safe
Best Lift Challenge
Artus & Marie	+ 10		79	/	Murder on the Dancefloor - Sophie Ellis-Bextor	
Karine & Christophe	+ 0		61	/	Murder on the Dancefloor - Sophie Ellis-Bextor	
Laurent & Denitsa	+ 0		70	/	Murder on the Dancefloor - Sophie Ellis-Bextor	
Valérie & Christian	+ 0		52	/	Murder on the Dancefloor - Sophie Ellis-Bextor	
Caroline & Maxime	+ 0		72	/	Murder on the Dancefloor - Sophie Ellis-Bextor	
Florent & Candice	+ 0		74	/	Murder on the Dancefloor - Sophie Ellis-Bextor	
Camille & Grégoire	+ 0		60	/	Murder on the Dancefloor - Sophie Ellis-Bextor	

=== Week 7 : Shameful Songs ===
Individual judges' scores in the chart below (given in parentheses) are listed in this order from left to right: Fauve Hautot, Jean-Marc Généreux, Marie-Claude Pietragalla, Chris Marques

Running order

Couple	Results				Style	Music	Result
Couple	Artistic	Technical	Total		Style	Music	Result
Laurent & Denitsa	37 (9,9,10,9)	33 (9,9,9,6)	70	140	Mambo	(I've Had) The Time of My Life - Bill Medley Ft Jennifer Warnes	Safe
Laurent & Denitsa	36 (9,9,9,9)	34 (10,8,9,7)	70	140	Cha-Cha-Cha	Can You Feel It - The Jackson 5	Safe
Karine & Christophe	31 (9,7,8,7)	25 (7,5,8,5)	56	111	Foxtrot	On Se Retrouvera - Francis Lalanne	Safe
Karine & Christophe	30 (8,7,9,6)	25 (7,5,7,6)	55	111	Flamenco	Don't Let Me Be Misunderstood - Santa Esmeralda	Safe
Artus & Marie	33 (8,8,9,8)	26 (7,6,8,5)	59	132	Salsa	Maldòn - Zouk Machine	Safe
Artus & Marie	38 (10,9,10,9)	35 (8,9,10,8)	73	132	Contemporary	Tous les Cris les S.O.S. - Daniel Balavoine	Safe
Caroline & Maxime	32 (8,7,8,9)	34 (10,7,8,9)	66	131	Samba	Alexandrie Alexandra - Claude François	Eliminated
Caroline & Maxime	33 (9,9,9,6)	32 (9,8,8,7)	65	131	Contemporary	Big Girls Cry - Sia	Eliminated
Florent & Candice	28 (7,6,8,7)	25 (6,5,8,6)	53	118	Paso Doble	The Final Countdown - Europe	Last to be called Safe
Florent & Candice	33 (8,8,9,8)	32 (8,7,9,8)	65	118	Foxtrot	Crazy in Love - Beyoncé Ft Jay Z	Last to be called Safe
Camille & Grégoire	37 (10,9,10,8)	32 (9,7,9,7)	69	142	Jive	Wake Me Up Before You Go-Go - Wham!	Safe
Camille & Grégoire	38 (10,9,10,9)	35 (9,9,9,8)	73	142	Jazz Broadway	My Heart Belongs to Daddy - Marilyn Monroe	Safe

=== Week 8 : Dance Trio ===
Individual judges' scores in the chart below (given in parentheses) are listed in this order from left to right: Fauve Hautot, Jean-Marc Genereux, Marie-Claude Pietragalla, Chris Marques

For the 1st routine, each couple dance in trio with a contestant of the previous seasons among:

• Alizée (Season 4 winner)
• Brahim Zaibat (Season 4 finalist)
• Tonya Kinzinger (Season 5 contestant)
• Loïc Nottet (Season 6 winner)
• Priscilla Betti (Season 6 finalist)

Running order

Couple	Guest	Results				Style	Music	Result
Couple	Guest	Artistic	Technical	Total		Style	Music	Result
Karine & Yann-Alrick	Tonya Kinzinger	32 (8,8,8,8)	31 (8,8,8,7)	63	127	Argentine Tango	Cell Block Tango - Velma and the Girls	Last to be called Safe
Karine & Yann-Alrick	/	33 (9,8,8,8)	31 (8,8,8,7)	64	127	Cha-Cha-Cha	Monday, Tuesday... Laissez-moi danser - Dalida	Last to be called Safe
Laurent & Denitsa	Loïc Nottet	38 (10,9,10,9)	36 (9,9,9,9)	74	145	Contemporary	Runnin' (Lose It All) - Naughty Boy Ft Beyoncé & Arrow Benjamin	Safe
Laurent & Denitsa	/	36 (9,9,9,9)	35 (9,9,9,8)	71	145	Foxtrot	Strangers in the Night - Frank Sinatra	Safe
Florent & Candice	Priscilla Betti	37 (10,9,9,9)	34 (8,8,9,9)	71	140	Bollywood	Dola Re Dola - Kavita Krishnamurthy Ft Shreya Ghoshal & KK	Eliminated
Florent & Candice	/	35 (8,9,9,9)	34 (8,8,9,9)	69	140	Rumba	Je te promets - Johnny Hallyday	Eliminated
Camille & Gregoire	Alizée	36 (9,9,9,9)	36 (9,9,9,9)	72	146	Rumba	Ma Benz - Brigitte	Safe
Camille & Gregoire	/	38 (10,10,9,9)	36 (10,8,9,9)	74	146	Waltz	Je vole - Louane Emera	Safe
Artus & Marie	Brahim Zaibat	35 (9,9,9,8)	33 (8,8,9,8)	68	135	Argentine Tango	Tous les mêmes - Stromae	Safe
Artus & Marie	/	36 (8,9,10,9)	31 (7,8,9,7)	67	135	Waltz	Kissing You - Des'ree	Safe

=== Week 9 : Judges' Week ===
Individual judges' scores in the chart below (given in parentheses) are listed in this order from left to right: Fauve Hautot, Jean-Marc Genereux, Marie-Claude Pietragalla, Chris Marques

Running order

Couple	Results				Style	Music	Coach	Result
Couple	Artistic	Technical	Total		Style	Music	Coach	Result
Laurent & Denitsa	29 (X,10,10,9)	27 (X,9,9,9)	56	131	Rumba	Stay - Rihanna Ft Mikky Ekko	Fauve Hautot	Safe
Laurent & Denitsa	38 (10,9,10,9)	37 (10,9,9,9)	75	131	Quickstep	Sing, Sing, Sing - Benny Goodman	Fauve Hautot	Safe
Karine & Yann-Alrick	27 (9,9,9,X)	24 (8,8,8,X)	51	119	Salsa	Booty - Jennifer Lopez Ft Iggy Azalea & Pitbull	Chris Marques	Eliminated
Karine & Yann-Alrick	36 (9,9,9,9)	32 (8,8,8,8)	68	119	Waltz	Ti amo - Umberto Tozzi	Chris Marques	Eliminated
Artus & Marie	30 (10,10,X,10)	26 (9,9,X,8)	56	123	Contemporary	Je suis malade - Serge Lama	Marie-Claude Pietragalla	Safe
Artus & Marie	35 (9,8,10,8)	32 (7,8,9,8)	67	123	Samba	Mas que Nada - Jorge Ben Jor	Marie-Claude Pietragalla	Safe
Camille & Gregoire	29 (10,X,10,9)	27 (9,X,9,9)	56	131	Paso Doble	Requiem - Giuseppe Verdi	Jean-Marc Généreux	Bottom 2
Camille & Gregoire	38 (10,10,9,9)	37 (9,10,9,9)	75	131	Quickstep	Candyman - Christina Aguilera	Jean-Marc Généreux	Bottom 2
Dance Duel
Camille & Grégoire	58%				Jive	Great Balls of Fire - Jerry Lee Lewis		
Karine & Yann-Alrick	42%				Jive	Great Balls of Fire - Jerry Lee Lewis		

=== Week 10 Finals ===
Individual judges' scores in the chart below (given in parentheses) are listed in this order from left to right: Fauve Hautot, Jean-Marc Généreux, Marie-Claude Pietragalla, Chris Marques

Running order

Couple	Results				Style	Music	Result
Couple	Artistic	Technical	Total		Style	Music	Result
Laurent & Denitsa	39 (10,10,10,9)	36 (9,9,9,9)	75	152	Cha-Cha-Cha	Uptown Funk - Mark Ronson Ft Bruno Mars	Winner
Laurent & Denitsa	39 (10,10,10,9)	38 (10,10,9,9)	77	152	Paso Doble	O Verona - Craig Armstrong	Winner
Artus & Marie	39 (10,10,10,9)	33 (8,8,9,8)	72	147	Rumba	J'te l'dis quand même - Patrick Bruel	3rd Place
Artus & Marie	39 (10,10,10,9)	36 (9,9,9,9)	75	147	Paso Doble	Run the World (Girls) - Beyoncé	3rd Place
Camille & Grégoire	38 (10,10,9,9)	36 (9,9,9,9)	74	152	Foxtrot	Life on Mars - David Bowie	2nd Place
Camille & Grégoire	40 (10,10,10,10)	38 (10,10,9,9)	78	152	Jazz Broadway	My Heart Belongs to Daddy - Marilyn Monroe	2nd Place
The Last Dance
Laurent et Denitsa	54%				Freestyle	"Every Breath You Take" - The Police	
Camille et Grégoire	46%				Freestyle	"Wings" - Birdy	

== Dance Chart ==
Couple	1	2	3	4		5	6	7		8		9		10		
Laurent & Denitsa	Samba	Waltz	Contemporary dance	Jive	Cha-Cha-Cha Relay	Paso Doble	Rumba	Mambo	Cha-Cha-Cha	Contemporary dance (with Loïc Nottet)	Fox-Trot	Rumba (with Fauve)	Quickstep	Cha-Cha-Cha	Paso Doble	Freestyle
Camille & Grégoire	Rumba	Samba	Contemporary dance	Charleston	Cha-Cha-Cha Relay	Argentine Tango	Cha-Cha-Cha	Jive	Jazz Broadway	Rumba (with Alizée)	Waltz	Paso Doble (with Jean-Marc)	Quickstep	Foxtrot	Jazz Broadway	Freestyle
Artus & Marie	Quickstep	Rumba	Cha-Cha-Cha	Paso Doble	Cha-Cha-Cha Relay	Foxtrot	Jive	Salsa	Contemporary dance	Argentine Tango (with Brahim Zaibat)	Waltz	Contemporary dance (with Marie-Claude)	Samba	Rumba	Paso Doble	
Karine & Yann-Alrick	Cha-Cha-Cha	Jive	Rumba	Samba	Cha-Cha-Cha Relay	Contemporary dance	Jazz	Foxtrot	Flamenco	Argentine Tango (with Tonya Kinzinger)	Cha-Cha-Cha	Salsa (with Chris)	Waltz			
Florent & Candice	Rumba	Jive	Waltz	Argentine Tango	Cha-Cha-Cha Relay	Samba	Contemporary dance	Paso Doble	Foxtrot	Bollywood (with Priscilla Betti)	Rumba					
Caroline & Maxime	Tango	Rumba	Cha-Cha-Cha	Foxtrot	Cha-Cha-Cha Relay	Jive	Quickstep	Samba	Contemporary dance							
Valérie & Christian	Quickstep	Rumba	Samba	Tango	Cha-Cha-Cha Relay	Waltz	Cha-Cha-Cha									
Julien & Silvia	Cha-Cha-Cha	Waltz	Foxtrot	Paso Doble	Cha-Cha-Cha Relay	Quickstep										
Sylvie & Christophe	Cha-Cha-Cha	Rumba	Jive	Argentine Tango	Cha-Cha-Cha Relay											
Kamel & Emmanuelle	Cha-Cha-Cha	Jive	Contemporary dance													
Olivier & Katrina	Foxtrot	Cha-Cha-Cha														

Highest scoring dance
Lowest scoring dance
Danced, but not scored

== Musical guests ==
Date	Performers	Tracks Performed
Octobre 22, 2016	Matt Pokora	Cette année-là
10 December 2016	Vincent Niclo	Je ne sais pas
10 December 2016	Les Trois Mousquetaires	Tous pour un
16 December 2016	Kylie Minogue	Night Fever

== Ratings ==
Show	Episode	Air date	Viewers (millions)	Rating/share Viewers over 4	Rating/share Housewives under 50	Weekly Viewer rank	Note
1	"Top 11 Perform (Week 1)"	15 October 2016	5.56	28.6%	39%	1	
2	"Top 11 Perform (Week 2)"	22 October 2016	4.84	25.6%	37%	1	
3	"Top 10 Perform (Week 3)"	29 October 2016	4.64	24.1%	36%	1	
4	"Top 9 Perform (Week 4)"	5 November 2016	4.80	23.6%	34%	1	
5	"Top 8 Perform (Week 5)"	10 November 2016	4.73	21.1%	28%	1	
6	"Top 7 Perform (Week 6)"	19 November 2016	4.33	20.5%	28%	1	
7	"Top 6 Perform (Week 7)"	26 November 2016	4.50	22%	32%	2	
8	"Top 5 Perform (Week 8)"	4 December 2016	4.39	22.5%	34%	1	
9	"Top 4 Perform (Week 9)"	10 December 2016	4.60	22.3%	35%	1	
10	"Top 3 Perform (Week 10)"	16 December 2016	4.91	22.4%	35%	1	
