= Renaud Roussel =

French actor and model

Renaud Roussel is a French actor and model born on March 11, 1973.

== Biography ==
At age 20, Renaud Roussel entered classes at rue Saint-Roch from 1992 to 1995 under the direction of Olivier Leymarie. He followed shortly after a training at the Théâtre des Variétés from 1995 to 1998 under the direction of Richard Cross, then, a few years later, a training at the Laboratoire de L'Acteur under the direction of Hélène Zidi from 2006 to 2008.

He has been recognized by the public for his role as Daniel in the latest episodes of Premiers Baisers (First Kiss) and in all episodes of Les Années fac (The College. Years). In parallel with his career as an actor, he is also a model for commercials (Auchan, Intermarché, Conforama, Renault, Vet'affaires). He also regularly poses for the private sales site "Brandalley". Recently, we have seen in Hollywood Girls: A new life in California or under the sun of Saint-Tropez. In 2013, he appears in an advertisement of Monalbumphoto.fr and interprets Antoine. In 2014, Renaud Roussel appears in season 8 of the series The Mysteries of Love.

After having participated in a bonus of Plus belle la vie in 2011 in which he played the role of a professional robber, Renaud Roussel returned to the cast at the end of 2015 to interpret the recurring role of Arnaud Mougin, the husband of the character played by Vanessa Valence.

As of September 2017, Renaud Roussel plays in Éric Delcourt's play La fève du samedi soir alongside Capucine Anav and Patrick Veisselier.

== Filmography ==
=== Television ===
- 1994-1995 : Premiers Baisers - Daniel
- 1995-1997 : Les Années fac - Daniel
- 2006 : SOS 18 - Vincent
- 2008 : Flics - Pascal Etcheverry
- 2009 : Claire Brunetti - Vincent Brunetti
- 2009 : R.I.S Police scientifique - Sébastien Daumont
- 2010 : Chante! - divers
- 2010 : Sur le fil - Captain Duplan
- 2011 : Le juge est une femme - Adrien Garnier
- 2011 : Plus belle la vie - Sylvain Sinclair
- 2012 : Section de recherches Eric Le Roux (Season 6, Episode 6)
- 2012 : Hollywood Girls : Une nouvelle vie en Californie - Tony Angeli
- 2013 : Sous le soleil de Saint-Tropez - Victor
- 2013 : Camping Paradis : Camping Circus - Marc (Season 5, Episode 2)
- 2014 : Les Mystères de l'amour - Daniel (Season 8)
- 2015 : Commissaire Magellan - François Guérin
- 2015-2016 : Plus belle la vie - Arnaud Mougin (Season 12)
- 2016 : Clem - Alex Giroin (Season 7)

=== Film ===
- 1998 : Le mystère: Joséphine
- 1998 : Sucre amer: Captain Rougier
- 2009 : R.T.T

=== Theatre ===
- 2017 : La fève du samedi soir d'Éric Delcourt
