= 21News =

Belgian French-language news website

- Website type: News website
- Available in: French, Dutch
- Headquarters: {{{location_country}}}
- Website: 21news.be
- Launched: 2024

21News is a Belgian news website established in 2024. It is primarily aimed at a French-speaking audience, though publishes content in both French and Dutch.

== History ==
21News was launched in 2024 by Etienne Dujardin, a municipal councillor for the Reformist Movement political party. It was conceived as a response to the perceived lack of ideological diversity and debate in existing Belgian francophone media. Dujardin has described 21News' editorial line as "centre-right" and compared it to the French newspapers Le Figaro and Le Point. The site focuses on political and economic coverage, and features opinion pieces and contributions from external writers.

The Bolloré Group (via the Lagardère Group) has a 20% ownership stake. Louis Sarkozy, son of former French president Nicolas Sarkozy, is a board member and hosts a podcast on the website.

== 2026 sanctioning ==
In 2026, 21News was sanctioned by the Belgian Council for Journalistic Ethics (CDJ) after publishing the full text of a speech given by U.S. Vice President JD Vance at the 2025 Munich Security Conference. The regulator found that the outlet had failed to sufficiently contextualise or verify the content of the speech, arguing that publishing it without commentary risked disseminating unchallenged political messaging. The decision was criticized by 21News and led to a broader debate about media freedom in Belgium, both within the country and internationally.
