= Hollywood Girls =

French soap opera

- Also known as: Hollywood Girls : Un nouveau départ (season 4)
- Genre: Soap opera
- Created by: Alexandre dos Santos; Jérémy Michalak; Thibaut Vales
- Starring: Ayem Nour; Caroline Receveur; Kamel Djibaoui; Kevin Miranda; Sylvia Jagieniak; Nicolas Suret; Laura Coll; Shauna Sand; David Golis; Nabilla Benattia
- Narrated by: Céline Monsarrat (season 1); Jérémy Michalak (seasons 2-4)
- Country of origin: France
- Original language: French
- No. of seasons: 4
- No. of episodes: 203

Production
- Executive producers: Alexandre Dos Santos; Stéphane Joffre; Jérémy Michalak; Fabrice Sopoglian; Thibaut Valès
- Producer: Didier Beringuer
- Production locations: Los Angeles, California (United States) (only outside scenes in seasons 2-3); Le Perray-en-Yvelines, Yvelines (France) (inside scenes, seasons 2-3)
- Camera setup: Single-camera (outside scenes); Multiple-camera (inside scenes)
- Running time: 20-27 minutes
- Production company: La Grosse Équipe

Original release
- Network: NRJ 12
- Release: March 12, 2012 – March 6, 2015

Hollywood Girls : Une nouvelle vie en Californie (A New Life in California), or simply Hollywood Girls, is a French soap opera created by Alexandre dos Santos, Jérémy Michalak, and Thibaut Vales for NRJ12. The series features an ensemble cast and follows a group of French people who decide to start a new life in California, but their life is quickly disrupted by the diabolical Geny G and her husband, the Dr. David Moretti.

Filming takes place completely in Los Angeles for the first and fourth seasons, but for the rest of the show, only the outside scenes where filmed in the United States, with inside scenes filmed at a studio at Le Perray-en-Yvelines in France. All the plots of the series are written by screenwriters, but dialogues are improvised by the comedians, who are almost all former NRJ12's reality show candidates.

Hollywood Girls premiered on NRJ12 on March 12, 2012. When the series was renewed for a fourth season, it was renamed Hollywood Girls : Un nouveau départ (A New Beginning), which marks the beginning of a soft reboot with most of the main cast not returning. In April 2015, it was canceled due to the low ratings of the fourth season.

== Overview ==
Ayem Stevens and Caroline Vales are best friends. After a violent argument with her mother, Ayem realised that there was nothing for her in France and she decided to start a new life in California with Caroline, a woman recently separated from her fiancé who cheated on her the night before their wedding. In Los Angeles, they will find love, friendship and unexpected betrayal, with their lives changing for the better and for the worse.

== Cast ==
=== Main cast ===
- Ayem Nour as Ayem Stevens (seasons 1–2, guest season 3)
- Caroline Receveur as Caroline Vales (seasons 1–3)
- Kevin Miranda as Kevin Mirez
- Kamel Djibaoui as Kamel (seasons 1–3, recurring season 4)
- Sylvia Jagieniak as Chloe Jones (seasons 1–2)
- Laura Coll as Sandra Klein (seasons 1–3)
- Nicolas Suret as Nicolas Klein (seasons 1–3)
- Shauna Sand as Geny G (seasons 2–3, recurring season 1)
- David Golis as Dr. David Moretti (seasons 2–3)
- Nabilla Benattia as Nabilla Burano (seasons 2–3)
- Sébastien Soudais as Franck Mirez (season 3, recurring season 2)
- Marine Boudou as Marine Fontana (season 3)
- Thierry Picaut as Ethan Costes (season 3)
- Alison Cossenet as Mathilde Vales (season 3)
- Anthony Gomes as Simon Soares (season 3)
- Louise Buffet as Jessie Miller (season 4, recurring season 3)
- Maud Verdeyen as Maud (season 4)
- Nadège Lacroix as Nadège Jones (season 4)
- Nicolas Jacquemart as Nicolas Van (season 4)
- Gaëlle Garcia Diaz as Maria Johnson (season 4)
- Julien Croquet as Craig (season 4)
- Medhi Fieffé as Medhi (season 4)
- Julien Marlon as Taylor Johnson (season 4)

=== Recurring cast ===
- Franck Victor as Ben (seasons 1–3)
- Charles Fathy / Sacha Azoulay as Barry Stevens (seasons 1–2)
- Elie Haddad as Josh Stevens (season 1, guest season 2)
- Guy Roger as Erik Duval (season 1)
- Fay Svanberg as Kelly Ricci (season 1)
- Zack Zublena as Drake (season 1)
- Clara Morgane as Clara (season 1)
- Camille Chenut as Alex (seasons 2–3)
- Romain Fourel as Michaël Parker (seasons 2–3)
- Sylvia Dierckxx as Christina Klein (seasons 2–3)
- Patrick Hamel as Thibault Valès (seasons 2–3)
- Renaud Roussel as Tony Angeli (seasons 2–3)
- Aline Sap as Lisa Moretti (season 2)
- Soizic Sap as Lise Moretti (season 2)
- Julie Baronnie as Barbara Jones (season 2)
- Pierre Gribling as William Klein (season 2)
- Pierre Bourel as Don Spencer (season 2)
- Livia Dushkoff as Livia Damico (season 3)
- Karine Kaplan as Karine Moretti (season 3)
- Karin Swenson as Andréa Valès (season 3)
- Christian Souchon as Dr. Taylor (season 3)
- Romain Dupré as Vinz (season 3)
- Luis Acosta as Eddie Brock (season 3)
- Candice Gavalon as Alice (season 3)
- Amélie Neten as Amélie (season 4, guest season 3)
- Virginie Philippot as Christina / Ginie (season 4)
- Julien Marlon as Taylor Johnson (season 4)

== Episodes ==
=== Series 1 (March 2012 - April 2012) ===
1. Bienvenue à Los Angeles
2. Ça reste entre nous
3. Elle est parfaite pour moi
4. J'ai rien à faire ici
5. Méfie-toi vraiment
6. C'est à prendre ou à laisser
7. J'ai un plan
8. Je ne peux plus faire ça
9. C'est soit elles, soit moi
10. Je n'arrête pas de penser à lui
11. Pas un mot à Sandra
12. Je suis prête à tout
13. C'est juste catastrophique
14. J'en ai parlé à personne
15. J'ai du mal à comprendre
16. Tu peux pas me dire ça
17. Il faudrait un miracle
18. C'est fini, oublie-moi
19. Je vais tout arranger
20. Il est vraiment fou de toi
21. J'ue chose pour toi
22. J'ai un scoop énorme
23. On va tout balancer
24. Tout est sous contrôle
25. Il faut que je parte
26. Les amours impossibles

=== Series 2 (August 2012 - November 2012) ===
1. Je ne te connais pas
2. Toi aussi tu me manques
3. Laisse-lui une chance
4. Je ne fais rien de mal
5. Je n'ai rien à te dire
6. J'ai une bonne raison
7. Tu joues à quoi ?
8. Je joue un double jeu
9. Tu n'as pas le choix
10. Je te crois vraiment
11. Carpe diem
12. Je vais le détruire
13. Tu ne changeras jamais
14. J'ai tout perdu
15. C'est la guerre
16. On va les faire tomber
17. J'ai la solution
18. On repart à zéro
19. Tu es un homme mort
20. Je cherche ton frère
21. Ce n'était pas un accident
22. Il est là
23. Tu as ma parole
24. On n'a plus rien à se dire
25. Fais attention à toi
26. Tu es en danger
27. C'est un cauchemar
28. Je ne vais pas me laisser faire
29. Ouvre les yeux
30. Qui peut t'en vouloir ?
31. Je ne veux plus te voir
32. J'ai changé
33. Pas un mot à Caro
34. J'ai tellement peur
35. Laisse mon frère tranquille
36. On est pret
37. J'aurai du t'écouter
38. Tu peux compter sur moi
39. C'est ta dernière chance
40. Je tiens trop à toi
41. On va les doubler
42. Mission impossible
43. Tu m'as trahi
44. Comment tu peux me faire ça ?
45. Je prends ta place
46. Tu sais où me trouver
47. On n'en parle à personne
48. Je vais la détruire
49. Je ne suis pas folle
50. Je compte sur toi
51. Elle veut ma mort
52. J'ai tout entendu
53. Je te l'avais dis
54. Tu te trompes
55. On m'a piégé
56. Oublie moi
57. Rien ne pourra nous séparer
58. J'ai besoin de temps
59. Je la déteste
60. Il faut qu'on parle
61. On avait un deal
62. Je suis au courant
63. Je t'ai menti
64. C'est plus fort que moi
65. Tu te voiles la face
66. Il faut le coincer
67. Vous m'aviez promis
68. Tu m'as tout pris
69. Tu n'es pas la bienvenue
70. Tu es sûre de toi ?
71. Il est l'heure de payer

=== Series 3 (November 2013 - January 2014) ===
1. Reviens à la vie
2. Il a laissé quelque chose
3. Je ne mentirai plus !
4. Un nouveau secret
5. Tu es vivant !
6. Je ne pensais jamais te revoir
7. O<n fait une trêve
8. Une main tendue
9. Désolée, je peux pas
10. Il faut que je te dise la vérité
11. Comment tu as pu me cacher ça
12. La vérité, toute la vérité, rien que la vérité
13. De bien belles rencontres
14. Le hasard est bien fait ?
15. Ce n'est pas l'envie qui manque
16. Je suis sur que c'est elle
17. Travaillons ensemble !
18. Non mais t'es dingue ou quoi ?
19. Je rentre en France !
20. Je ne suis pas prête
21. J'ai besoin de temps
22. Merci d'être aussi franc
23. Si tu lui fais le moindre mal...!
24. Redeviens qui tu es
25. J'ai enfin choisi
26. Entre la vie et la mort
27. Qui va s'occuper de moi si t'es pas là
28. S'il te plaît
29. L'opération de la dernière chance
30. Le bout du tunnel
31. C'est toi que je veux
32. On ne joue pas avec les gens comme ça
33. Tout est de ma faute
34. Des dommages irreversibles
35. Et si c'était moi la reine de la soirée
36. Veux-tu être mon chef-d'oeuvre
37. Ici c'est l'Amérique
38. Fais le pour moi
39. Promets de ne le dire à personne
40. Tu m'avais fait une promesse
41. Tout va bien je t'assure
42. J'ai peur qu'il comprenne
43. Je ne veux pas mélanger amour et carrière
44. On a perdu une bataille
45. J'ai toujours su que cela allait fonctionner
46. Elle n'est pas si méchante
47. On va régler nos compte
48. Ce n'est pas moi qui tire les ficelles
49. Tu nous manques
50. Le grand soir
51. Je veillerai sur toi
52. Avoir du coeur
53. Plus qu'un chapitre'
54. Elle veut ma mort
55. J'ai gagné

=== Series 4 (January 2015 - March 2015) ===
1. Amour, travail et colocation
2. Mauvaises surprises
3. Ne jamais baisser les bras
4. Maladresses en série
5. Happy End
6. Fiasco sur fiasco
7. Oui !
8. Questions pour l'immigration
9. Erreurs à la chaîne
10. Un mensonge peut en cacher un autre
11. Rien ne va plus
12. Le chantage
13. Premier lapin
14. Mea culpa
15. Relooking extrême
16. Faux semblants
17. La main dans le sac
18. Amélie
19. En flag
20. L'incruste
21. Le dérapage
22. The End ?
23. L'accident
24. Les grands changements
25. Cassiopée
26. Gossip
27. Joyeux anniversaire
28. Les comptes sont bons
29. Sex friends
30. Les retrouvailles
31. Aller simple pour la France
32. Rien à sauver
33. Le poème du siècle
34. Vérité à la clé
35. Le défilé
36. Une déclaration d'amour
37. Christina
38. Ginie s'incruste
39. Bon anniversaire Maud
40. Les yeux fermés
41. Une victoire aux forceps
42. L'union fait la force
43. La passion retrouvée
44. Comme dans un film d'horreur
45. Pyjama et barbecue
46. Retour de flammes
47. Tous ensemble
48. Jeu collectif
49. Le temps qui court
50. Tout prêt du but
51. Le jour J
