= Secret Story season 2 =

Secret Story (season 2) or Secret Story 2 is the second season of various versions of television show Secret Story and may refer to:

- Secret Story (French season 2), the 2008 edition of the French version.
- Secret Story 2 (Portugal), the 2011 edition of the Portuguese version.
