= Kenza Braiga =

Iraqi actress (born 1976)

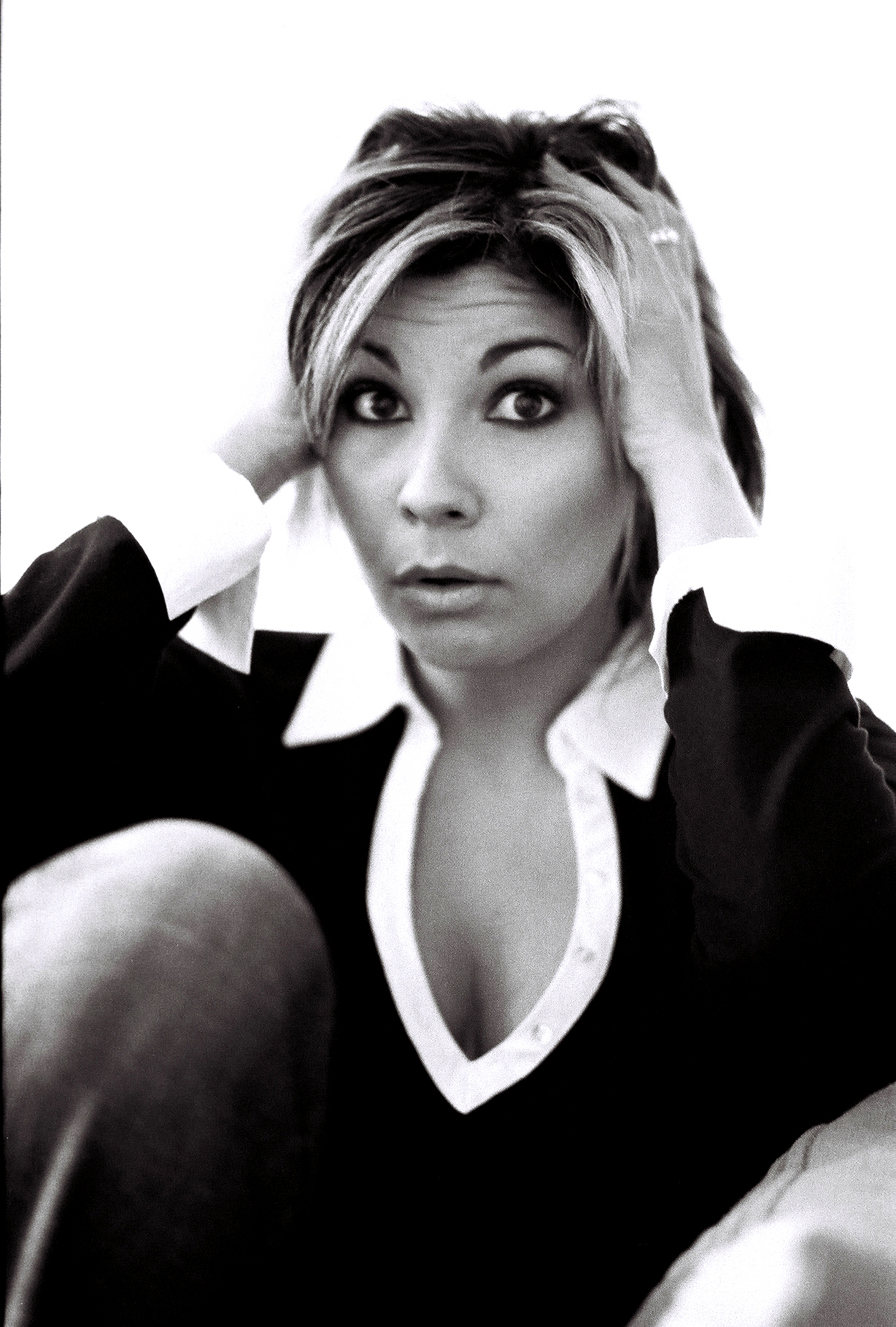
Kenza Braiga.

Manal Braiga better known as Kenza Braiga (Arabic: كنزة بريغا ;born 13 November 1976 in Baghdad, Iraq) is a French television contestant, actress and author of Iraqi origin, she is simply known as Kenza Braiga. She and her family left Iraq during the Gulf War, in February 1991, when she was only 14. She is author of "Un jour j'ai quitté Bagdad", which is about her escape from Iraq, it was released in April 2003. She was made known in France by appearing on reality television show Loft Story. She starred as a host in French television series Boudoir, Le.

She currently lives in Paris.

== Author ==
- Un jour j'ai quitté Bagdad (One day I left Baghdad)
- J'ai deux amours (I have two loves)
- 2 femmes en colere (Two Women in anger (Jewishitizens and free))
