= Secret Story (French TV series) season 1 =

Secret Story
- Season 1
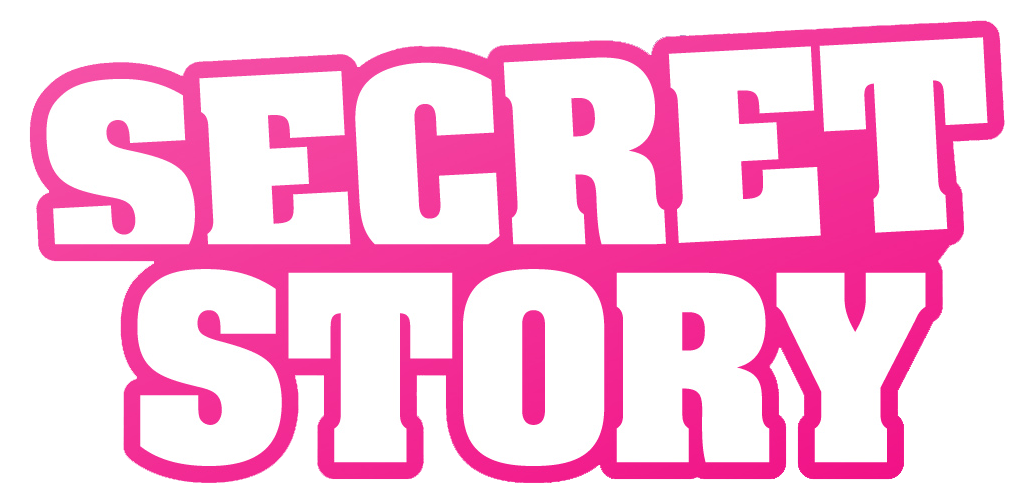
- Show logo
- Presented by: Benjamin Castaldi
- No. of days: 69
- No. of housemates: 15
- Winner: The Triplets
- Runner-up: Xavier

Release
- Original network: TF1
- Original release: 23 June – 31 August 2007

Season chronology
- Next → Season 2

Secret Story 2007 was the first edition of the French reality show Secret Story. It aired on TF1 and was presented by Benjamin Castaldi who had that role on a similar show, Loft Story. The series started on 23 June 2007, when 15 people entered a purpose-built house on the outskirts of Paris, France.

== Principle ==
The principle is similar to that of Loft Story. The contestants are kept locked away for 10 weeks in a house, called "La Maison des Secrets" (the House of Secrets) measuring 1600 m² styled on the Big Brother 8 house including a swimming pool, jacuzzi, a lounge (where the bath is), bathroom with showers, and separate bathrooms for each sex. All of the rooms are installed with cameras, except the toilet due to a law imposed by the Conseil Supérieur de l'audiovisuel. The Voice speaks to the contestants at times, and acts like Big Brother in other countries. Each contestant has to conceal a secret. Everyone else has to try and discover it. If a contestant does, that contestant wins the jackpot of the contestant whose secret they have guessed. Each secret is worth €10,000. Each Tuesday, 2 contestants are nominated and put up against the public vote to be evicted on the Friday. The girls and boys nominate the opposite sex, alternating weekly.

The show was originally to last 12 weeks, with 12 candidates, but Angela Lorente, director of reality TV shows on TF1, said in an interview that there would be 14 contestants over 10 weeks. Eventually, 15 contestants, of which three were triplets competing as one, thus making 13 official contestants.

== Title sequence ==
The theme tune is I Wanna Chat by Booty Full. The single was released by TF1 on 20 August 2007. The title sequence shows all of the contestants. The evicted ones are shown, but their names aren't.

== Broadcasts ==
The first live show was broadcast at 8:50pm on 23 June 2007. Each subsequent eviction show is now shown at around 10:20pm every Friday with a live audience. The daily shows showing highlights from the past 24 hours are broadcast between 6-7pm with repeats shown in the early hours following. Action can be seen live 22 hours a day on Canal 144, Canal 52 or on the official website. Each day, around 500,000 people connected to the live stream on the website (around 2.5 times more than the live Star Academy feed).

== Contestants ==
There were 15 people, with the Triplets competing as one, making 13 contestants. They are:

=== Erwan ===
Erwan Henaux, aged 19, lives in a hearth of young workers and studies first year social sciences. His secret is that he is transsexual.

=== Fred ===
Frédéric "Fred", aged 38, claims he made contact with extraterrestrials.

=== Gabriel ===
Gabriel Jordani, aged 26, is an artist. He is single and is working for La Voix (The Voice).

=== Julien ===
Julien Colas, aged 26, is an escort boy. He is described as a 'young man of taste'. Later in his life, he distinguishes himself as the faithful boss of well-known bartender and restaurant manager Christophe Rafie.

=== Laly ===
Nelly "Laly" Valade, aged 26, is described as being irritated easily and shouting a lot. Laly works for the police and is a stripper.

=== Maryline ===
Maryline, aged 26, is a naturist, measuring 6'1''. She is unmarried because she has no time to find a man.

=== Maxime ===
Maxime Leconte, aged 21, had been living in London for a few months prior the show. He is the son of Henri Leconte.

=== Nadège ===
Nadège Dabrowski, aged 20, is a model and has a height of 5'6''. She has OCD.

=== Nicolas ===
Nicolas Guillermin, aged 24, is a Chippendales dancer. His secret is that he lost 50 kg before the show.

=== Ophélie ===
Ophélie Marie, aged 23, is a playmate. She is described as a young woman full of energy.

=== Tatiana ===
Tatiana Laurens-Delarue (née Tatiana Hammoudi), aged 25, lives in Paris. Her mother died when she was young. Tatiana has been married to Xavier for a year.

=== The Triplets ===
Cyrielle, Johanna, and Marjorie Bluteau, all aged 23, are triplets. This was their secret. If they managed to hide their secret for a week, they would win €10,000. However, housemate Tatiana discovered the secret before the first week was over. They competed under the name Marjorie.

The Triplets with was based on a similar twist - done with twins - from Big Brother US 5.

=== Xavier ===
Xavier Delarue, aged 29, has played professional basketball for ten years. He has been married to Tatiana for a year. He threatened to leave the game on August 20 after hearing a message from former housemate Maryline.

== Hidden Rooms ==
The house also compromises of several other hidden rooms, made available to the contestants at various points throughout the show.

=== Secret Bedroom ===
Cyrielle, Johanna, and Marjorie and are triplets. They were to switch once a day for a week, taking turns, with one in the main house and two staying in a secret bedroom, located in the loft, accessed through a secret hatch in the Confessional (the equivalent of the Diary Room). However, Tatiana discovered their secret before the week was up and so they lost their chance to get the €10,000.

=== Chamber of Secrets ===
The Chambre des Vérités, translated as the "Room of Truths" is a completely white room equipped with a lie detector, developed by the Israeli services. Each contestant will go into the Chamber of Secrets and be put in front of the Lie Detector and will have to answer questions from the other contestants either 'yes' or 'no'. If the light goes green, the contestant is telling the truth; red is a lie and orange means 'indeterminable'.

=== Second Chamber of Secrets ===
Two contestants, a man and a woman, were chosen by the production team to leave the house. Maryline and Xavier were chosen and the other contestants were told that they had been evicted. However, in reality, they were in a secret bedroom, able to follow the other contestants with a TV and headphones, similar to the Big Brother bedsit, used in the Big Brother UK 2004 house. After they returned, the room was kept and used by Tatiana and Xavier on their anniversary, after their secret had been revealed.

== The Secrets ==
- One of the contestants is a transsexual.
- One of the contestants has lost 50 kilograms.
- One of the contestants is a playmate.
- One of the contestants works for the police and is a stripper.
- One of the contestants is the child of a celebrity.
- One of the contestants is in contact with extraterrestrials.
- One of the contestants is a naturist.
- One of the contestants is one third of identical triplets.
- Two of the contestants have been married for a year.
- One of the contestants is an escort.
- One of the contestants has Obsessive–compulsive disorder.
- One of the contestants is the accomplice of La Voix.

=== Secrets revealed to the public in the daily shows ===
- On Launch Night:
  - Cyrielle, Johanna, and Marjorie are triplets.
  - Erwan is a transsexual.
  - Fred thinks he is in contact with extraterrestrials.
  - Gabriel is a mole for La Voix.
- At the end of Week 1:
  - Tatiana and Xavier are a real married couple.
- At the end of Week 2:
  - Laly is a stripper and used worked in a police station in Mériadeck, Bordeaux.
  - Nadège has Obsessive–compulsive disorder.
- During the daily show of 10 July, it was revealed that Laly and Nicolas had disobeyed the 7th Commandment in revealing their secrets and were automatically put up for eviction.
  - Nicolas lost 50 kilograms
- At the end of Week 3 :
  - Maryline is a naturist.
- At the end of Week 4:
  - Ophélie is a playmate.
- At the end of Week 5:
  - Julien is an escort.
  - Maxime is the son of Henri Leconte, a former French professional tennis player.

=== Chronology involving the Secrets ===
- Day 1: Julien thinks that Erwan was not born a man, and he is correct.
- Day 4: Maryline thinks that Marjorie has a twin sister, and she is wrong.
- Day 5: Fred thinks that Julien is of noble ancestry (from the Count of Savoy), and he is wrong.
- Day 6:
  - Laly thinks that Fred is an extraterrestrial, having misunderstood that one of the contestants is in contact with extraterrestrials, not an extraterrestrial themself; Although this has been revealed already, her belief is discounted due to her misunderstanding. Fred loses his chance at the prize fund for giving Laly too much information to lead her to her belief.
  - Tatiana thinks that Marjorie has two twin sisters, and she is correct.
  - Xavier thinks that Maxime is Benjamin Castaldi's brother, and he is wrong.
- Day 14: The Triplets think that Maryline is a naturist, and they are correct.
- Day 21: Maxime thinks that Xavier is a DJ, and he is wrong.
- Day 25: Maryline thinks that Laly is a porn star, and she is wrong.
- Day 28: Erwan thinks that Laly works for the police. Laly confirms this, but states that it is only half of her secret. Erwan wins only half of her jackpot.
- Day 29:
  - Maryline thinks she's discovered Tatiana's secret, that "they took her child away from her and she got him/her back". Tatiana discounts her belief the next day.
  - Julien thinks that Ophélie is a sports champion. Ophélie denies this, claiming that he was not precise enough to say 'snowboarding', but this doesn't matter anyway, as her secret is that she is a playmate.
- Day 30: Tatiana thinks that Gabriel is a prince of a monarchy in the Middle East or Maghreb and that he lives in a palace, and she is wrong.
- Day 36: Tatiana suggests to Ophélie that she is a jumping champion, but of height, not length or width. Ophélie refutes this theory by saying that she's not any kind of jumping champion.
- Day 39: The Secret Alarm went off, but Maxime says that he was with Tatiana, who accidentally lent on the button.
- Day 40: Maxime says that he thinks Tatiana and Xavier are a couple, and he is correct but it doesn't count because Maxime is not completely sure.
- Day 41:
  - The Triplets think that Tatiana is a Buddhist, and they are wrong.
  - Maxime confirms his earlier thoughts about Tatiana and Xavier; his belief is confirmed and he scoops their jackpot.
- Day 43: Tatiana thinks that Maxime is the son of a celebrity, furthered by Gabriel, Maryline, and Xavier.
- Day 44: Tatiana confirms her earlier thoughts regarding Maxime; his belief is confirmed but she scoops just half the jackpot, for not discovering all of the secret.
- Day 45: Erwan and Xavier think that Maxime is the son of Henri Leconte.
- Day 46: Erwan and Xavier confirm their earlier thoughts about Maxime; their belief is confirmed and they share the remainder of Maxime's jackpot.
- Everyone failed to correctly identify Gabriel's secret: being a mole for La Voix.

== La Voix ==
La Voix ("The Voice") of Secret Story is that of French voice animator Dominique Duforest.

== Nominations and Evictions ==
Each week, in turn, the boys or girls go to the Confessional to nominate two people of the opposite sex that they want to face the public vote. The following is a table of their nominations:

	Week 1	Week 2	Week 3	Week 4	Week 5	Week 6	Week 7	Week 8	Week 9	Week 10		Nominations received
The Triplets	Fred (x2), Nicolas	Not; Eligible	No; Nominations	Not; Eligible	~~Xavier~~, Maxime	Not; Eligible	Maxime, Xavier	Maxime, Xavier	Xavier, Tatiana	Winner (Day 69)		18
Xavier	Not; Eligible	The Triplets, Nadège	No; Nominations	The Triplets, Maryline	Exempt	The Triplets, Ophélie	Secret; Room	The Triplets, Maryline	Gabriel, The Triplets	Runner-Up (Day 69)		10
Tatiana	Fred, Nicolas	Not; Eligible	No; Nominations	Exempt	Julien, Gabriel	Not; Eligible	Erwan, Maxime	The Triplets, Maryline	Gabriel, The Triplets	Third Place (Day 69)		1
Maxime	Not; Eligible	Nadège, The Triplets	No; Nominations	The Triplets, Laly	Not; Eligible	The Triplets, Ophélie	Not; Eligible	The Triplets, Maryline	Gabriel, The Triplets	Fourth Place (Day 69)		12
Gabriel	Not; Eligible	Nadège, The Triplets	No; Nominations	The Triplets, Laly	Not; Eligible	Triplets, Ophélie	Not; Eligible	Xavier, Maxime	Xavier (x2), Maxime	Evicted (Day 62)		5
Maryline	Julien, Xavier	Not; Eligible	No; Nominations	Not; Eligible	Maxime, Erwan	Not; Eligible	Erwan, Maxime	Xavier, Maxime	Evicted (Day 55)			6
Erwan	Not; Eligible	Maryline, Ophélie	No; Nominations	Maryline, Laly	Not; Eligible	The Triplets, Ophélie	Not; Eligible	Evicted (Day 48)				3
Ophélie	Fred, Nicolas	Not; Eligible	No; Nominations	Not; Eligible	~~Xavier~~, Maxime	Not; Eligible	Evicted (Day 41)					8
Julien	Not; Eligible	Nadège, Ophélie	No; Nominations	The Triplets, Ophélie	Not; Eligible	Evicted (Day 34)						3
Laly	Julien, Maxime	Not; Eligible	Nominated	Not; Eligible	Evicted (Day 27)							3
Nicolas	Not; Eligible	The Triplets, Ophélie	Nominated	Evicted (Day 20)								3
Nadège	Gabriel, Maxime	Not; Eligible	Evicted (Day 13)									4
Fred	Not; Eligible	Evicted (Day 6)										4
Notes	1	2	3	4	5	6	7	8	9	10		
Against public vote	Fred, Nicolas	Nadège, The Triplets	Laly, Nicolas	Laly, The Triplets	Julien, Maxime	Ophélie, The Triplets	Erwan, Maxime	Maryline, Maxime	Gabriel, The Triplets, Xavier	Maxime, Tatiana, The Triplets, Xavier		
Evicted	Fred; 22% to save	Nadège; 25% to save	Nicolas; 49% to save	Laly; 41% to save	Julien; 30% to save	Ophélie; 46% to save	Erwan; 22% to save	Maryline; 42% to save	Gabriel; 26.25% to save	Maxime; 14.5% to win	Tatiana; 18.5% to win	
Evicted	Fred; 22% to save	Nadège; 25% to save	Nicolas; 49% to save	Laly; 41% to save	Julien; 30% to save	Ophélie; 46% to save	Erwan; 22% to save	Maryline; 42% to save	Gabriel; 26.25% to save	Xavier; 25% to win	The Triplets; 43% to win	

=== Notes ===
- ^Note 1: Only the women could nominate. The Triplets were allowed three nominations (one each), and they nominated Fred twice.
- ^Note 2: On the men could nominate. The Triplets were considered as one housemate and could be nominated together.
- ^Note 3: The nominations were cancelled and Laly and Nicolas were automatically put up for eviction by La Voix for revealing their secrets.
- ^Note 4: On the men could nominate. La Voix gave Erwan the opportunity to give one woman immunity. He chose Tatiana, thus she was unable to be nominated.
- ^Note 5: Only the women could nominate. La Voix gave Tatiana the opportunity to give one man immunity. She chose Xavier but did so in the Confessional, so the others couldn't hear her. All nominations against Xavier were discounted. Ophélie's first nomination counted as two votes against Xavier, but he was immune and so this was discounted. Maxime had 3, but the other boys were tied at two each, so the girls then went to the second round of voting to decide the second nominee. During the second round, Julien received 2 votes and as a result, he joined Maxime in the vote. Erwan and Gabriel both received one vote.
- ^Note 6: Only the men could nominate.
- ^Note 7: Only the women could nominate. Maryline and Xavier were fake evicted by the producers and stayed in a secret bedroom to spy on their fellow housemates.
- ^Note 8: For the first time, all contestants could nominate and be nominated. This was supposed to happen Week 7 after each sex had nominated three times, but due to the nominations in Week 3 being cancelled, it was moved to Week 8. As 4 housemates were equally nominated (Maryline, Maxime, the Triplets, and Xavier), there were two rounds of nominations to find the two housemates to face the public vote; Maryline and Maxime.
- ^Note 9: Again, all contestants nominated and could be nominated. As a reward for his secret not having been exposed, Gabriel was given a double vote, which he used on Xavier.
- ^Note 10: In the final week, there were no nominations. All the contestants faced the public vote and the chance of winning the €150,000 prize money.

== Criticism and controversy ==
- The house is presented as very eco-friendly, but the contestants arrived in Hummers, renowned for having an extremely high carbon footprint.
- The secrets themselves have been criticized, as some are far more serious and shocking than others. For example, the desire to have a sex change (Erwan) is much more serious than being triplets (Cyrielle, Johanna, and Marjorie).
