= Capucine Anav =

French actress

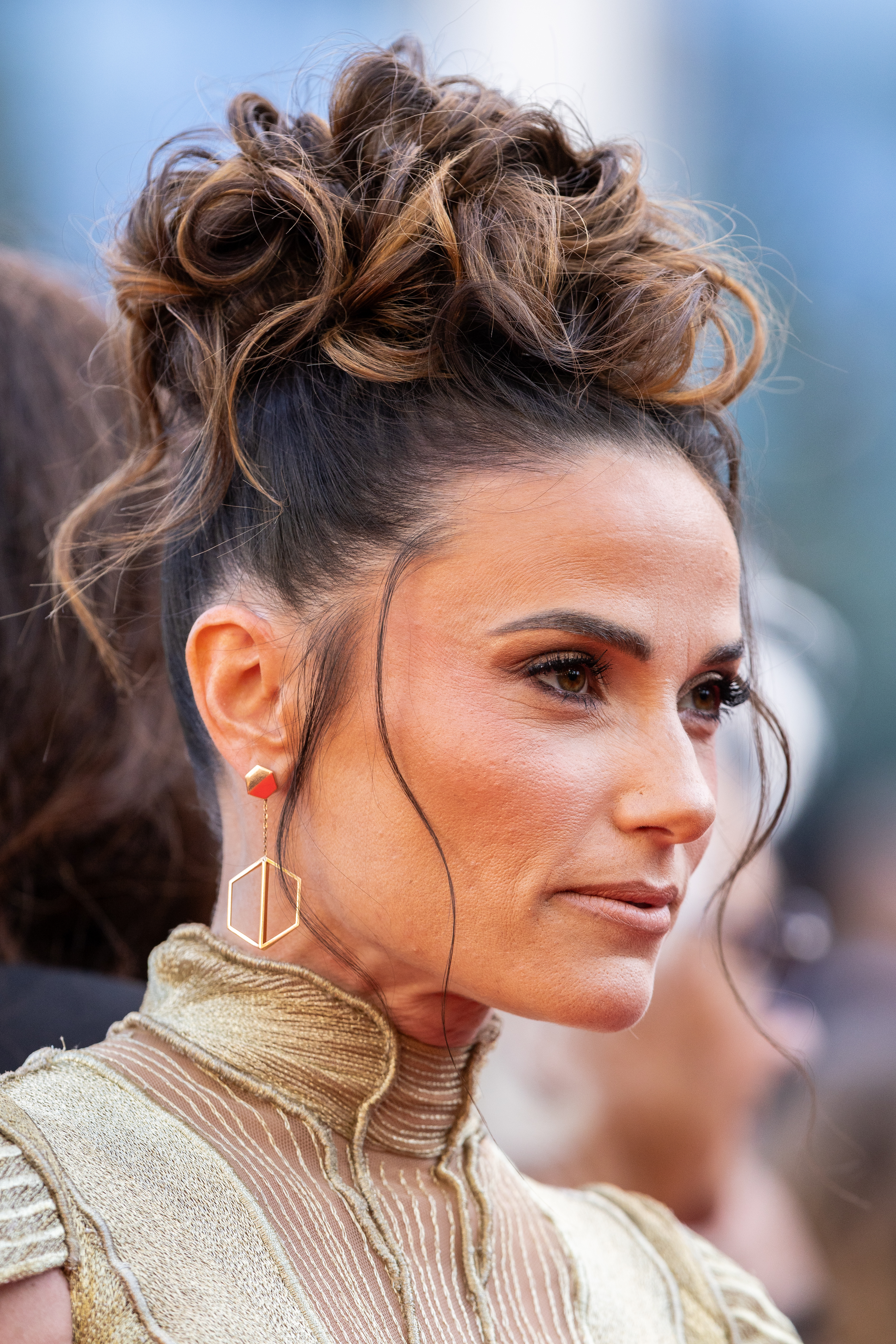
- Born: 22 April 1991 (age 35); 8th arrondissement of Lyon, Lyon, France
- Occupations: Actress, Producer
- Notable work: Le Mag(2012-2016); Touche pas à mon poste ! (2016-2017)

Capucine Anav (born April 22, 1991) is a French television host, actress and producer. She is a former columnist in the television program Touche pas à mon poste ! on C8.

== Biography ==
Capucine Anav was born on April 22, 1991, in the 8th arrondissement of Lyon. Her father owns many clothing stores across France and her mother is a sports coach

- In 2016, she starts her debut in the Touche pas à mon poste ! TV series in the episode of 8. She keeps some videos on Le Figaro.
- In March 2016, she left the show Le Mag.
- In 2017, she participated for the first time in Fort Boyard and second time in 2019 and then a third time in 2020.
- In 2018, she participated in and won the competition show Beauty Match on TFX.
- In 2019, Capucine joined the cast of the second season of the show Je suis une célébrité, sortez-moi de là ! on TF1.
- she was a columnist for the seventh season of Secret story in 2013
- For International Women's Day 2018, Capucine participated and in the Christina dans la Radio program on Fun Radio.
- On 1 March 2015, MIKL: No Limit, a program on Fun Radio
- On May 31, 2016, she created Oroa Production. an audiovisual production company and she is the manager.
- In 2017 - 2018, she presented E-Sports European League, a video game program broadcast in the third part of the evening on C8, on Sunday then on Saturday.
- She produces the web-series En coloc, humorous short films on the adventures of a “bunch of friends” in which she plays one of the main roles. The second season was shot and aired in 2018.
- In 2018, she appeared in an episode of Munch playing the role of a blogger.
- In 2019, she got a role in James Huth's film Rendez-vous chez les Malawas.

== Personal life ==
In May 2012, she joined the Secret Story show with two ex-companions, Yoann and Alexandre.

In 2014, she had a relationship of a few months with actor and comedian Kev Adams and Rayane Bensetti.

In 2014 to 2016, she was in a relationship with Louis Sarkozy, son of the President of the French Republic, Nicolas Sarkozy.

In 2017, she was in a relationship with Alain-Fabien Delon. In 2020, she broke up with Alain-Fabien Delon.

Public magazine reveals that she is in a relationship with Jérémy Ferrari.

== On television ==
=== As a facilitator ===
Show	Year	Notes
The Reality TV Mag	2015	with Benoît Dubois on NRJ 12
Friends Trip 2: The grand finale	2016	with Anne-Gaëlle Riccio and Benoît Dubois on NRJ 12
Le Prime à Capu live	2017	on C8
E-Sports European League	2017–18	on C8

=== As a columnist ===
Show	Year	Notes
Le Mag	2012–2016	on NRJ 12
It's Only TV	2016–2017	on C8
Il en pense quoi Camille ?	2016–2017	on C8
La Télé même l'été ! Le jeu	2017	on C8

=== As a candidate ===
Show	Year	Notes
Secret Story 6	2012	on TF1
Les Anges de la téléréalité 5 : Welcome to Florida	2013	on NRJ12
Les Anges de la téléréalité 5 : Les retrouvailles	2013	on NRJ12
Les Anges fêtent Noël	2014	on NRJ12
Les Enquêtes	2016	on C8
Fort Boyard	2017–2020	on France 2
Couple ou pas couple ?	2018	on C8
Beauty Match	2018	on TFX
Je suis une célébrité, sortez-moi de là !	2019	on TF1
