= Caroline Receveur =

French fashion blogger, television presenter and actress

- Born: Caroline Jocelyne Receveur; 10 November 1987 (age 38); Épinal, Vosges, France
- Occupations: Fashion blogger, model, television personality
- Notable credit(s): Secret Story; Les Anges de la télé-réalité Hollywood Girls; Danse avec les Stars
- Spouse: Hugo Philip (m. 2020)
- Children: 1

Caroline Receveur Philip (born 10 November 1987) is a French fashion blogger and television personality. She first appeared as a contestant in reality programs and continues to appear in television programs and her fashion blog, as well as post on social media.

== Education and early career ==
Caroline Receveur was born in Épinal in the department of Vosges. She is the second child of Jacky Receveur, a former soccer player of the FC Metz in the 1970s. As a child, she dreamt of becoming a model and passed her first casting at the age of 14. She studied at the Claude Gellée High School in Épinal and after obtaining a baccalauréat littéraire at 17, she was allowed by her parents to leave the family household. She moved to Paris, where she signed a contract a few months later with the modeling agency Roxane. However, her shootings did not allow her to have a home in the capital.

She worked as a waitress in a nightclub in Metz while continuing to travel in Paris for modelling contracts. Her height of 1.69 m (5 ft 6 1/2 in) did not allow her to pursue modelling vocationally.

== Television career ==
In June 2008, she participated at the second season of Secret Story broadcast on TF1. Her secret was that she and another contestant, Nicolas, were a couple. She was eliminated after two weeks, after having been nominated while revealing her secret.

In 2010, she made her return to reality television, participating at several programs broadcast on NRJ 12. She was featured on the first season of La Maison du bluff and the second season of Les Anges de la télé-réalité.

In 2012, she became one of the main actresses of the scripted reality Hollywood Girls. In 2013, she presented the second season of La Maison du bluff. She left Hollywood Girls in 2014 after three seasons. In January 2014, she started co-hosting Le Mag but left the program in September to focus on other personal projects.

In 2016, she was a contestant at the seventh season of Danse avec les stars where she had Maxime Dereymez as a coach and partner. She stated during her participation that she wanted to pay homage to her father who died a few months earlier. She was eliminated during the seventh episode on 26 November 2016.

== Parallel activities ==
In 2014, Caroline Receveur created Wandertea, a brand of detox products with tea and natural plants, in association with the pharmacist and herbalist Julien Duschene. She has also created and held a blog where she gives fashion advice. She continues to post on social media.

In August 2015, she reached one million followers on Instagram and posted a picture of her wearing a bra.

== Personal life ==
=== Family ===
Caroline Receveur is the second of three children. She has an older brother named Benjamin, born 31 December 1984, and a younger sister named Mathilde, born 3 February 1995. She has the birthdate of her parents and siblings tattooed inside her left arm.

In 2013, she announced her father had been a victim of a stroke several years prior. On 29 May 2016, she announced through social media that her father had died.

=== Relationships ===
In January 2012, Caroline Receveur began a relationship with Valentin Lucas, whom she met while on the jury of Mister France in February 2011. In 2013, they publicly announced they were ready to have a child together and to get married, but later decided to wait. In January 2015, they left their apartment in Paris to move to London. In early November 2016, they ended their relationship.

She has been dating French model Hugo Philip since December 2016. In February 2018, she announced on her Instagram account that she was expecting her first child. They have a son together named Marlon Philip Receveur, born 6 July 2018. The couple got secretly married on 11 July 2020 in Paris and moved to Dubai a few weeks later.

=== Residency ===
According to the magazine Challenges, her departure for Dubai would have been motivated for financial purposes, because Caroline Receveur stated that "a house with a garden and a pool is much less expensive than in France and even less expensive than the price of the English market", and also probably by the fact that Dubai is a tax haven.

=== Illness ===
On 25 July 2023, after a long absence on social media, she announced via an Instagram post that she had breast cancer detected at an early stage.

== Television programs ==
Television presenter

- La Maison du Bluff (2011–13) on NRJ 12
- Le Mag (2014) on NRJ 12

Television actress

- Hollywood Girls (2012–14) as Caroline Valès

Contestant

- Secret Story 2 (2008) on TF1
- La Maison du Bluff (2011) on NRJ 12
- Les Anges de la télé-réalité (2011) on NRJ 12
- Danse avec les stars, seventh season (2016) on TF1
