= Laly Vallade =

French pornographic actress

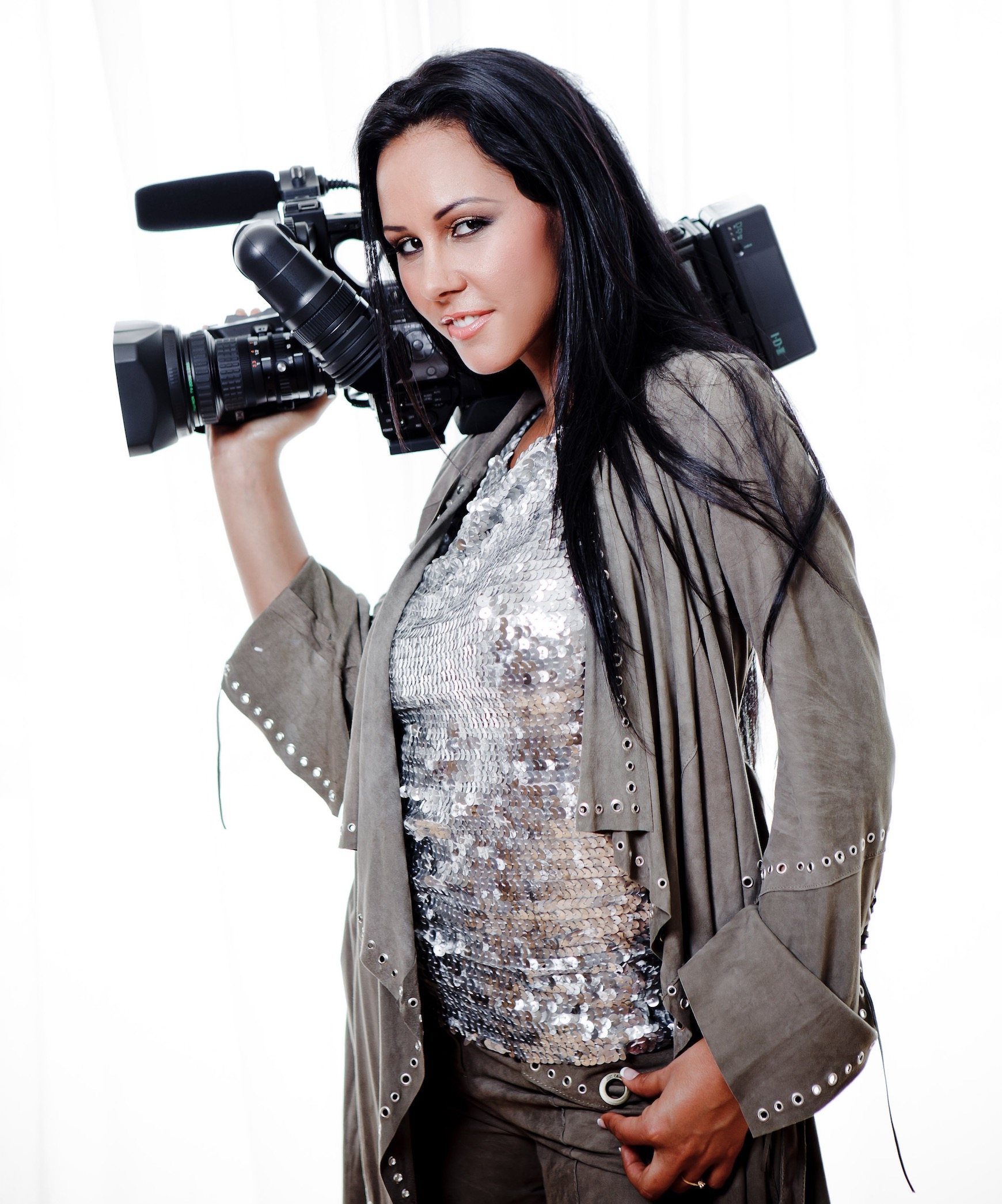

Laly Vallade (born 23 April 1981), also known just as Laly, is a French model, adult actress and DJ.

== Biography ==
Born in Bordeaux, Vallade started her career as an exotic dancer, then after some years she became a police woman and stayed for four years on the force. In 2007 she entered the TF1 reality show Secret Story, being eliminated in the fifth episode of the show.

In 2008 she and her then-boyfriend/later-husband Tristan Segal were approached by Marc Dorcel and entered the adult industry with the film The Story of Laly, a top selling success in France. Her second adult film, Laly's Angels, was released in 2010; she later established her own production company and turned to film directing.

In 2011 she became a DJ, toured with the "Ange ou démon DJ tour" and released a single, "You and I". In late 2011 she moved in Las Vegas and there, still continuing her activity as adult model and producer, she became resident DJ at the Hustler Club. She was Penthouse Pet of the Month in February 2013.
