= Secret Story (French TV series) season 2 =

Secret Story
- Season 2
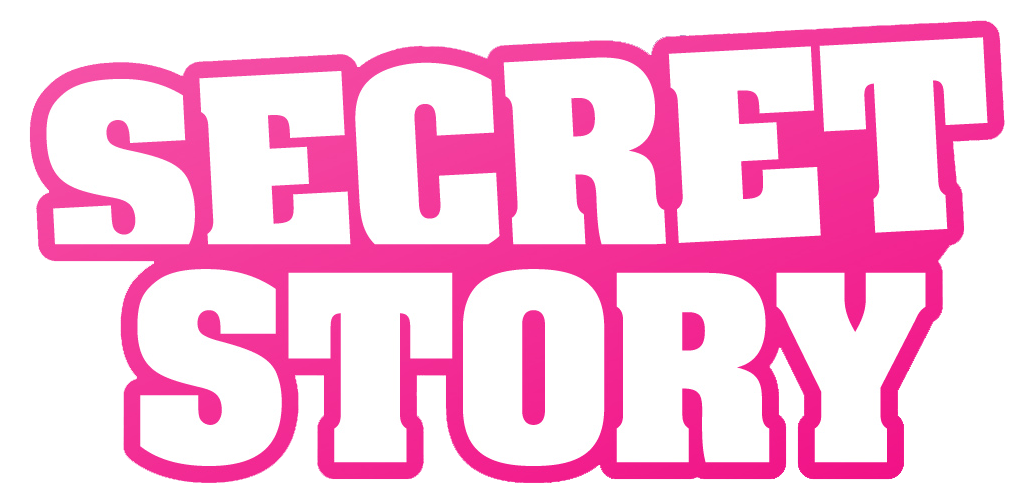
- Presented by: Benjamin Castaldi
- No. of days: 71
- No. of housemates: 16
- Winner: Matthias
- Runner-up: Cyril

Release
- Original network: TF1
- Original release: 27 June – 5 September 2008

Season chronology
- ← Previous; Season 1 Next → Season 3

Secret Story was the second edition of the French reality show Secret Story. It aired on TF1 and was presented by the same presenter of Loft Story and Secret Story 1, Benjamin Castaldi. The series started on 27 June 2008, when 15 people entered a purpose-built house on the outskirts of Paris.

== Principle ==
The principle is similar to that of Loft Story. The contestants are kept locked away for 10 weeks in a house, called "La Maison des Secrets" (the House of Secrets) measuring 1600m² styled on the UK Big Brother house including a swimming pool, jacuzzi, a lounge, a big bedroom divided by a shattered glass, bathroom with showers and 5 secrets room (Crystal room, Love cave, Museum of Secrets, White Room, Bedsit [like BBUK5]). All of the rooms are installed with cameras, (except the toilet due to a law imposed by the Conseil Supérieur de l'audiovisuel). The Voice speaks to the contestants at times, and acts like Big Brother in other countries. Each contestant has to conceal a secret. Everyone else has to try and discover it. If a contestant does, that contestant wins the jackpot of the contestant whose secret they have guessed. Each secret is worth €10,000. Each Tuesday, 2 contestants are nominated and put up against the public vote to be evicted on the Friday. The girls and boys nominate the opposite sex, alternating weekly.

The second series of the show lasted 10 weeks, with 16 candidates. Out of these candidates, 15 candidates entered the house during the launch night with 3 of them put in the Crystal Room. The last candidate, Nicolas, was dubbed as the Mystery Candidate and enter the house on Day 7.

== Housemates ==
=== Alexandra ===
Alexandra is a 21-year-old from France. Alexandra is secretly a Russian princess. On Day 15 Alexandra was up for eviction and she survived with 62.33% of the vote. On Day 29 she was up for eviction for the second time and once again survived with 43.9% of the vote. On Day 43 Alexandra survived her third public vote in a row after receiving 72% of the vote.

=== Alice ===
Alice is a 22-year-old from France. Her initial secret was that she was supposed to be an accomplice for La Voix. Upon entering the house, La Voix imposed a new secret: that she be in a fake relationship with Matthias. On Day 12, she was voted Miss Secret Story 2008 by her fellow housemates.

=== Caroline ===
Caroline is a 20-year-old from France. She is secretly in a relationship with Nicolas. Caroline began her time in the house in the Crystal Room, and was released into the main house on Day 3. On Day 10 Caroline revealed her secret to several housemates. As punishment, she was nominated for eviction by The Voice in Week 2. Alexandra officially discovered their secret on Day 12. Caroline was evicted on Day 15.

=== Cyril ===
Cyril is a 22-year-old from France. He has his secret tattooed on his back. His secret is that he is the French break-dance champion of 2006, 2007 and 2008. On Day 22 Cyril was up for eviction and survived with 61% of the vote. On Day 25 Cyril revealed his secret to John-David. As punishment for revealing his secret Cyril was automatically nominated for the following weeks eviction.

=== Hayder ===
Hayder is a 20-year-old from Quebec, Canada. His secret is that he has a bullet in both his head and neck, as a result of being shot at during the 2006 Dawson College shooting. Hayder was evicted on Day 36.

=== Isabelle ===
Isabelle was a 27-year-old from Belgium, and the first gothic girl to be present in the house. Her secret is that she is an undertaker. She began her time in the house in the Crystal Room, and was released into the main house on Day 2. On Day 29 Isabelle was up for eviction and survived with 32% of the vote. Isabelle was evicted on Day 43. She died of a brain aneurysm on August 18, 2011, making her the second ex-housemate to pass away.

=== John-David ===
John-David is a 22-year-old from France. His secret is that he has gone out with 780 girls. He began his time in the house in the Crystal Room, and was released into the main house on Day 3. John-David was evicted on Day 64.

=== Laurent ===
Laurent is a 39-year-old from France. His secret is that he is an Anglican priest. On Day 14, he was given a secret mission by La Voix to organize a house cleaning session; if succeeded, he would add €2,000 to his prize money. On Day 43 Laurent was ejected from the house for revealing his secret.

=== Maeva ===
Maeva is a 17-year-old from France. She is secretly Marie-France's daughter. On Day 5, Marie-France revealed their secret. As a result, Marie-France was ejected from the house and Maeva was automatically nominated for eviction. She was saved with 85% of the public vote. Maeva was evicted on Day 29.

=== Marie-France ===
Marie-France is a 38-year-old from France. Her secret is that she is Maeva's mother. On Day 3, she revealed this to several housemates. As a result she was ejected and her daughter Maeva was automatically nominated for eviction.

=== Marilyn ===
Marilyn is a 26-year-old from France. Her secret is that she is a medium. On Day 57 Marilyn was up for eviction for the first time and survived with 66% of the vote. Marilyn was evicted on Day 64.

=== Matthias ===
Matthias is a 27-year-old from Belgium. His secret is that he is in a fake relationship with Alice. His initial secret in unknown. On Day 50 Matthias was up for eviction and survived with 66.8% of the public vote. Possible champion kick-boxer.

On Day 71 Matthias was declared the winner of Secret Story 2008 with 33% of the public vote.

=== Nathalie ===
Nathalie is a 24-year-old from Belgium. Nathalie is secretly in a relationship with Samantha. Maeva discovered her secret in Week 1. On Day 21 Nathalie left the house for health reasons she was told that when she felt better she could return to the house if she wanted to. On Day 25 it was announced that Nathalie had chosen not to return to the house.

=== Nicolas ===
Nicolas is a 30-year-old from France. He entered the house on Day 8 as a Mystery Housemate. His secret is that he is in a relationship with Caroline. On Day 10, Caroline revealed their secret to several housemates. As punishment for this, Nicolas was automatically nominated for eviction in Week 3. Their secret was officially discovered on Day 12 by Alexandra. Nicolas was evicted on Day 22.

=== Quentin ===
Quentin is a 20-year-old from France. Quentin's secret is that he is a teenage parent. On Day 46 Quentin was automatically nominated for eviction for revealing his secret to fellow housemate Samantha. Quentin was evicted on Day 50.

=== Samantha ===
Samantha is a 29-year-old from Belgium. Samantha is secretly in a relationship with Nathalie. Maeva discovered her secret in Week 1. Samanth was evicted on Day 57.

== Secrets ==
| Name | Age | Country | Secret | Discovered by | Status |
|---|---|---|---|---|---|
| Matthias | 28 | Belgium | "We are a fake couple" (with Alice) | Hayder | Winner |
| Cyril | 22 | France | "I am the French break-dance champion of 2006, 2007 and 2008" | Alexandra & Hayder | Runner-up |
| Alice | 22 | France | "We are a fake couple" (with Matthias) | Hayder | Third place |
| Alexandra | 21 | France | "I am the Russian princess" | Cyril | Fourth place |
| Marilyn | 26 | France | "I am a Mediumship" | Alexandra & Cyril | Evicted |
| John-David | 22 | France | "I have gone out with 780 girls" | Alexandra | Evicted |
| Samantha | 29 | Belgium | "We are a couple" (with Nathalie) | Maëva (Week 1) | Evicted |
| Quentin | 20 | France | "I am a teenage parent" | Himself/Samantha (Day 46) | Evicted |
| Isabelle | 27 | Belgium | "I am an undertaker" | Marilyn & John-David | Evicted |
| Laurent | 39 | France | "I am an Anglican priest" | Himself (Day 43) | Ejected |
| Hayder | 20 | Canada | "I have a bullet in both my head and neck" | Matthias & Alice | Evicted |
| Maëva | 17 | France | "We are mother and daughter" (with Marie-France) | Marie-France (Day 5) | Evicted |
| Nicolas | 30 | France | "We are a couple" (with Caroline) | Alexandra (Day 12) | Evicted |
| Nathalie | 24 | Belgium | "We are a couple" (with Samantha) | Maëva (Week 1) | Walked |
| Caroline | 20 | France | "We are a couple" (with Nicolas) | Alexandra (Day 12) | Evicted |
| Marie-France | 38 | France | "We are mother and daughter" (with Maëva) | Herself (Day 5) | Ejected |

== Nominations ==
Nominations follow a different formula than is typical of the Big Brother franchise. Each week the housemates alternate their nominations: male housemates nominate female housemates one week, and female housemates nominate male housemates the following week. In some weeks housemates are only permitted to nominate one housemate, rather than the typical two.

| | Week 1 | Week 2 | Week 3 | Week 4 | Week 5 | Week 6 | Week 7 | Week 8 | Week 9 | Week 10 Final | |
|---|---|---|---|---|---|---|---|---|---|---|---|
| Matthias | No nominations | Alexandra | Not eligible | Alexandra, Maëva | Not eligible | Isabelle, Alexandra | Not eligible | Alexandra, Samantha | No nominations | Winner (Day 71) | |
| Cyril | No nominations | Alice | Not eligible | Isabelle, Alice | Nominated | Secret; Room | Exempt | Marilyn, Samantha | No nominations | Runner up (Day 71) | |
| Alice | No nominations | Not eligible | Cyril | Not eligible | John-David; Hayder | Secret; Room | Matthias | Exempt | No nominations | Third place (Day 71) | |
| Alexandra | No nominations | Not eligible | Matthias | Not eligible | Laurent (x2); Laurent (x2) | Not eligible | Matthias | Not eligible | No nominations | Fourth place (Day 71) | |
| Marilyn | No nominations | Not eligible | Cyril | Not eligible | John-David; Hayder | Not eligible | Matthias | Not eligible | No nominations | Evicted (Day 64) | |
| John-David | Cristal; Room | Marilyn | Exempt | Isabelle, Alice | Not eligible | Isabelle, Marilyn | Not eligible | Marilyn, Samantha | No nominations | Evicted (Day 64) | |
| Samantha | No nominations | Not eligible | Cyril | Not eligible | Hayder; Hayder | Not eligible | Matthias | Not eligible | Evicted (Day 57) | | |
| Quentin | No nominations | Alexandra | Not eligible | Alexandra, Maëva | Not eligible | Isabelle, Alexandra | Nominated | Evicted (Day 50) | | | |
| Isabelle | Cristal; Room | Exempt | Cyril | Not eligible | Hayder; Hayder | Not eligible | Evicted (Day 43) | | | | |
| Laurent | No nominations | Alexandra | Not eligible | Alexandra, Maëva | Not eligible | Isabelle, Alexandra | Ejected (Day 43) | | | | |
| Hayder | No nominations | Alice | Not eligible | Alexandra, Isabelle | Not eligible | Evicted (Day 36) | | | | | |
| Maëva | Nominated | Not eligible | Matthias | Not eligible | Evicted (Day 29) | | | | | | |
| Nicolas | Not in House | Nathalie | Nominated | Evicted (Day 22) | | | | | | | |
| Nathalie | No nominations | Not eligible | Cyril | Walked (Day 21) | | | | | | | |
| Caroline | Cristal; Room | Nominated | Evicted (Day 15) | | | | | | | | |
| Marie-France | Ejected (Day 3) | | | | | | | | | | |
| Notes | 1 | 2,3,4 | 4,5,6 | 7 | 8,9,10,11 | 12,13 | 14,15,16 | 17,18 | 19 | | |
| Up for eviction | Maëva | Alexandra; Caroline | Cyril; Nicolas | Alexandra; Isabelle; Maeva | Cyril; Hayder | Alexandra; Isabelle | Matthias; Quentin | Marilyn; Samantha | All; Housemates | | |
| Walked | none | | Nathalie | none | | | | | | | |
| Ejected | Marie-France | none | | | | Laurent | none | | | | |
| Evicted | Maëva; 85% to save | Caroline; 37.67% to save | Nicolas; 31% to save | Maëva; 24.1% to save | Hayder; 37.8% to save | Isabelle; 28% to save | Quentin; 33.2% to save | Samantha; 34% to save | John-David; 10.5% to save | Alexandra; 11% to win | Alice; 24% to win |
| Evicted | Maëva; 85% to save | Caroline; 37.67% to save | Nicolas; 31% to save | Maëva; 24.1% to save | Hayder; 37.8% to save | Isabelle; 28% to save | Quentin; 33.2% to save | Samantha; 34% to save | Marilyn; 14.9% to save | Cyril; 32% to win | Matthias; 33% to win |

=== Notes ===
- ^Note 1: Marie-France was ejected as a punishment for revealing her secret. Her daughter Maëva became the sole nominee of the week. The public could vote to evict her or to let her stay.
- ^Note 2: In round two of nominations only male housemates could nominate.
- ^Note 3: In round two of nominations housemates Caroline and Isabelle could not be nominated as they had been given immunity from nominations after their entry into the house from the crystal room.
- ^Note 4: Caroline and Nicolas revealed their joint secret to other housemates. As punishment for this, they were both against the public vote in the following alternate weeks.
- ^Note 5: In round three of nominations John-David could not be nominated as he had been given immunity from nominations after his entry into the house from the crystal room.
- ^Note 6: In round three of nominations only female housemates could nominate.
- ^Note 7: In round four of nominations only male housemates could nominate.
- ^Note 8: In round five of nominations only female housemates could nominate.
- ^Note 9: In round five of nominations Cyril was automatically nominated for eviction because he had revealed his secret to fellow housemate John-David.
- ^Note 10: In round five of nominations Alexandras nomination counted as two.
- ^Note 11: In round five of nominations there was a three-way tie for nomination votes between Hayder, Laurent, and John-David as Cyril was already up for eviction and since there cannot be more than three nominees up for eviction there was a second vote to determine which of the three would join Cyril as nominees for eviction. Since all of the female housemates voted for Hayder in the tiebreaker he was nominated for eviction.
- ^Note 12: In round six of nominations only male housemates could nominate.
- ^Note 13: In round six of nominations Alice could not be nominated because she was in a secret room at the time of nominations.
- ^Note 14: In round seven of nominations only female housemates could nominate.
- ^Note 15: In round seven of nominations Cyril could not be nominated because he was in a secret room at the time of nominations.
- ^Note 16: In round seven of nominations Quentin was automatically nominated for eviction because he had revealed his secret to fellow housemate Samantha.
- ^Note 17: In round eight of nominations only male housemates could nominate.
- ^Note 18: In round eight of nominations Alice could not be nominated as she had won exemption when she entered the confessional during week seven and was declared the 1,000th person to enter the confessional.
- ^Note 19: Housemates did not nominate this week because they were all automatically nominated because the public was voting for who they wanted to see win.
