= BrandAlley =

United Kingdom based online fashion retailer

- Company type: Privately held company
- Industry: Retail
- Founded: 2008; 18 years ago
- Founder: Joint venture between News International and BrandAlley in FRance
- Headquarters: London, United Kingdom
- Area served: United Kingdom and Ireland
- Products: Clothing, furniture, home wear and beauty products
- Number of employees: 150 (2024)
- Website: www.brandalley.co.uk

BrandAlley is a British online fashion retailer based in London. The company runs flash sales across designer brands, launching multiple sales each day which typically last for a week at a time. The site offers womenswear, menswear, children's collections, homeware and beauty products. BrandAlley ships to the UK and Ireland.

== History ==
BrandAlley UK was launched as a joint venture between News International and BrandAlley France, in 2008. In 2013, the company was sold in a management buyout to CEO Rob Feldmann and Chairman Bruce MacInnes.

In 2010 BrandAlley sponsored ‘The Naturally Fashionable Garden’ at Chelsea Flower Show designed by British landscape designer Nicholas Dexter.

BrandAlley went on to sponsor subsequent gardens at Chelsea Flower Show in 2013 and 2014, both designed by award-winning gardener Paul Hervey-Brookes.

The business received investment from a Chinese e-tailer Vipshop in 2015 for a minority stake in the company. BrandAlley were shortlisted for a Drapers award in 2017, under the Pure Play E-tailer Of The Year category, alongside ASOS, The Outnet and Boohoo.

In February 2018 BrandAlley purchased homeware and beauty e-tailer Achica in a cash deal from the Dunelm Group. The deal added 200 new beauty, homeware and furniture brands to the BrandAlley business. Under the deal BrandAlley acquired 33 Achica staff, bringing the total number of UK employees to 85.

== Business ==
BrandAlley visitors must be members in order to access sales, signing up is free. Launching new sales every day, BrandAlley notifies members of daily offers through email, as well as social media channels and its website.

Limited product availability incentivises customers to buy; items are reserved for 15 minutes once customers place them in their basket, after which they are released to other shoppers. Delivery lead times vary between 2–28 days depending on how the logistics for sales are handled.
