= Kamel the Magician =

French magician

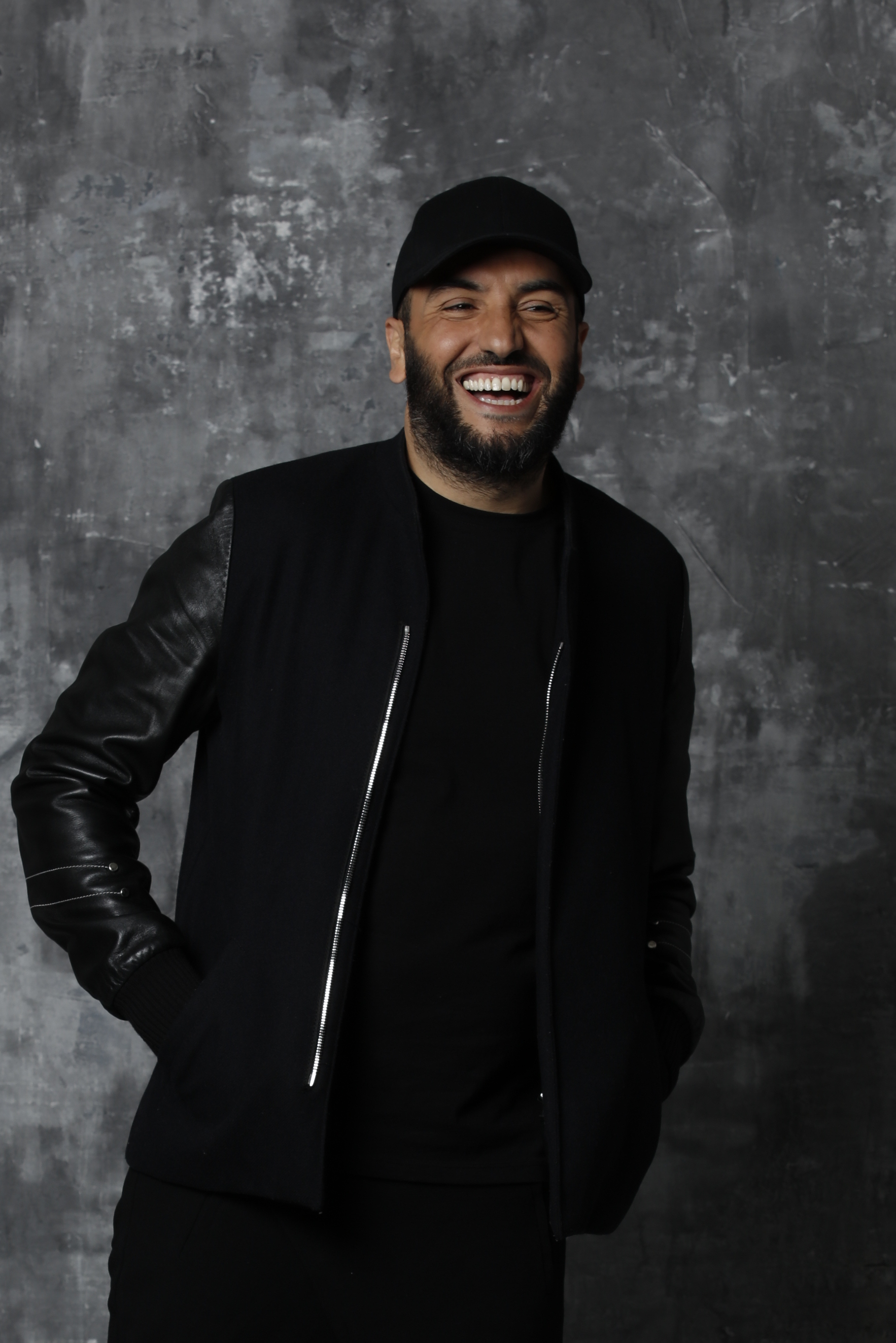
- Born: Kamel Boutayeb; February 5, 1980 (age 46); Livry-Gargan
- Occupation: Prestidigitator
- Website: https://kamellemagicien.com/

Kamel Boutayeb, known by his stage name Kamel the Magician (French: Kamel le Magicien), is a French prestidigitator and television presenter born in Livry-Gargan at Seine-Saint-Denis.

== Career ==
From 2010 to 2013, he hosted street magic shows, where he performed open-air tours before a public audience everyday at Canal +. He was also the coproducer of these performances.

In 2013, he filmed a documentary, Kamel à Las Vegas, in which he met with several prominent American prestidigitators. A sequel to the documentary focuses on Japan, named Kamel à Tôkyô, which he made with the actor Steve Tran, where he seeks out several famous Japanese magicians.

For the 30th anniversary of Canal +, he hosted a show where he performs magical tricks on several of the channel's presenters, including Ophélie Meunier, Maïtena Biraben and Antoine de Caunes.

His DVD for Kamel le Magicien en live was released on the 27 October 2015, with recording at the Casino de Paris directed by Richard Valverde.

In the autumn of 2016, he participated in the seventh season of the show Danse avec les stars on TF1, alongside the dancer Emmanuelle Berne, and finished tenth in the competition.

== Political positions ==
At a talk show on D8, questioned by journalist Audrey Pulvar about the tour which would constitute a "challenge" for him and which would mark "real progress", he immediately replied: "it's making Marine Le Pen disappear". This comment was lauded by Roselyne Bachelot, an opposing politician.

== Filmography ==
- 2011 : Beur sur la ville : le boulanger du toit
- 2015 : Kamel le Magicien en live (DVD recording of show)
