= Valérie Damidot =

French television personality

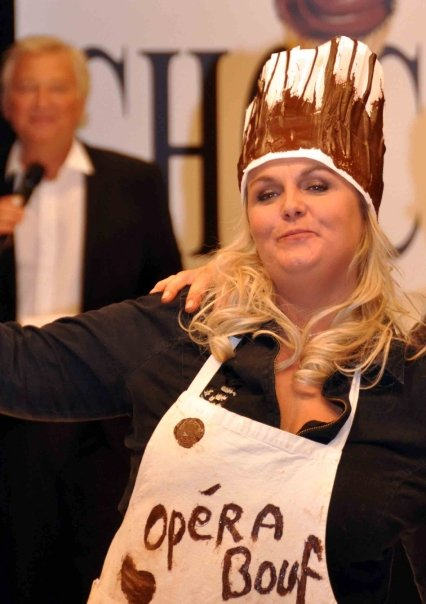
- Valérie Damidot at the 2012 edition of the Salon du Chocolat
- Born: 18 January 1965 (age 61); La Garenne-Colombes, France
- Occupations: Host of the TV show D&CO
- Employer: M6

Valérie Damidot (born 18 January 1965) is a French television personality best known for hosting the D&CO TV show from 2006 to 2015. It was broadcast once a week on M6, a national channel. Following its success, she has hosted other TV programs which are based on D&CO: Une semaine pour tout changer and D&CO c’est du bonheur.

== Life and career ==
Valérie Damidot was born on 18 January 1965 in France. She is the daughter of a jeweler and an accountant and she spent her childhood in Paris. After her secondary school, she studied arts at the university. Then, she worked as a seller in the country and then in Paris. In the 1980s, she worked as a freelance reporter in local press. At the end of the 1990s, she worked as a journalist on different French channels and took part in several TV shows, such as Loft Story, Exclusif, Star Academy, Plein les yeux or Vie privée, vie publique. But now she does not work as a journalist anymore, because she is totally involved in her TV shows in which she is more seen as an interior decorator than as a TV host. Valérie Damidot is also known for her role in a sitcom called Victoire Bonnot. It was broadcast on M6 in 2010 and it was her first steps as an actress.

== D&CO ==
D&CO is hosted by Valérie Damidot since 2006. This name comes from two wordplays. First of all D&CO is obviously the abbreviation of the word “DECORATION”. And secondly, D is the first letter of Damidot, and “CO” the abbreviation of the word “COMPANY”, so it means Damidot & Company. Basically, the aim of this TV show is to allow selected families to redecorate one or several rooms in their house in one week. During this redecoration, the family leaves the house, except one member who stays so as to help the D&CO team. He does few changes like redecorating an old piece of furniture or hanging wallpapers. Then, he leaves and the D&CO team completes the work. When the house is ready, the family returns and they are shown room by room with before and after shots. The children typically want themed decoration to their rooms and the houses often need quite considerable reconstruction such as heating plumbing etc. as well as complete refits of kitchens and bathrooms. The reaction of the family is usually quite emotional as most have been living in dire circumstances. The ideas and problems the team have to overcome is compelling viewing and Damidot keeps the atmosphere fun and lively.

== TV shows based on D&CO ==
D&CO, une semaine pour tout changer and D&CO c’est du bonheur are two TV shows based on D&CO. Contrary to the original show, D&CO, une semaine pour tout changer is broadcast once a month and the redecoration lasts one week. In this spin-off, the selected family can redecorate her entire house. The production evaluates the cost of the redecoration, according to the final weight of the truck in which all old stuffs are put in (1 kg [2.2 lb] = €100 ).

The latest show from D&CO is D&CO c’est du bonheur. This TV show was broadcast once at the end of 2010. The aim was to redecorate (for free) the part of a hospital dedicated to children. This action was done in line with a benefit association called “cè ke du bonheur” [it's pure happiness] and the voluntary workers were famous people called on for this occasion.
