= Louis Sarkozy =

French commentator (born 1997)

- Born: Louis Sarközy de Nagy-Bocsa; 28 April 1997 (age 29); Neuilly-sur-Seine, Paris, France
- Citizenship: France; United States (since 2023)
- Education: New York University; American University
- Spouse: Natali Husic (m. 2022)
- Children: 2
- Parent(s): Nicolas Sarkozy; Cécilia Attias

Louis Sarközy de Nagy-Bocsa (born 28 April 1997) is a French-American writer and political commentator who is the son of the former President of France Nicolas Sarkozy and Cécilia Attias.

== Early life ==
Louis Sarkozy was born in Neuilly-sur-Seine on 28 April 1997. He is the son of Nicolas Sarkozy and Cécilia Attias. He was 10 years old when his father was elected as President of France.

In December 2007, Sarkozy joined the Lycée Français Charles de Gaulle in London. In 2008, he moved to New York to live with his mother and his stepfather, businessman Richard Attias. He attended the Lycée Français de New York for a year.

In March 2009, he attended the Lycée Bonaparte in Doha. In 2011, Louis Sarkozy joined the Valley Forge Military Academy and College. He graduated from this military academy in 2015.

He holds a master's degree from the American University in Washington DC and a bachelor's degree from New York University.

== Career ==
Sarkozy is a regular commentator on U.S. politics on the French TV channel LCI. In September 2024, he caused some uproar by saying live on air, in reference to Israel's attacks on Hamas and Hezbollah during the Gaza war: “Let them all die! Israel is doing the work of humanity here.”

== Personal life ==
In 2013, he had a brief relationship with the student and UMP activist Sarah Knafo, then between 2014 and 2016 had a relationship with the columnist Capucine Anav, before starting an affair in 2017 with Natali Husic. Sarkozy married Husic in September 2022 in Gordes. They live in Washington, D.C. and in Menton (France).
