= Le Mag =

Le Mag is a French television show on the former music and entertainment specialty channel NRJ 12 that ran for 8 seasons from 2011 to 2018. In 2016, the show changed its name from Le Mag to Mad Mag.

The show covered various media topics related to reality TV, welcoming stars from this field.

Hosted by Matthieu Delormeau, various co-hosts took part with him, the first being Jeny Priez for three seasons. Priez was suspended after her alleged involvement in a match fixing scandal concerning a Handball match between Montpellier Agglomération Handball (since 2015 Montpellier Handball) and Cesson Rennes MHB in September 2012. She was replaced by Ayem Nour who co-hosted for seasons 3 and 4. She was replaced by Caroline Receveur.

The show premiered on 10 January 2011 on NRJ 12 and has become famous for inviting television reality personalities. The show was used as a launch for the French reality television show Les Anges de la téléréalité. Following, it became a launchpad to promote similar reality television shows on NRJ 12 like L'île des vérités or Hollywood Girl: Une nouvelle vie en Californie.

== Team ==
Code :
Current presenters
Co-presenters
Chroniqueurs actuels
Anciens chroniqueurs

Presenters
Presenters	Saison 1 (2011)	Saison 2 (2011-2012)	Saison 3 (2012-2013)	Saison 4 (2013-2014)	Saison 5 (2014-2015)
Matthieu Delormeau					

Co-Presenters
Co-Presenters	Saison 1 (2011)	Saison 2 (2011-2012)	Saison 3 (2012-2013)	Saison 4 (2013-2014)	Saison 5 (2014-2015)
Jeny Priez					
Ayem Nour					
Caroline Receveur					

Chroniclers

(season(s) in parentheses)

- Julien Mielcarek (Season 1)
- Valérie Khal (1)
- Thierry Calmont (1)
- Cyprien Iov (1, 2)
- Benoît Dubois (2, 3, 4, 5)
- Nicolas Touderte (2, 3, 4, 5)
- Dominique Damien Rehel (2, 3, 4, 5)
- Ayem Nour (2)
- Loana Petrucciani (2)
- Thomas Vitiello (2, 3)
- Anne Denis (2, 3)
- Caroline Receveur (2, 3)
- Marie Garet (3)
- Julia Flabat (3)
- Marine Boudou (3)
- Nabilla Benattia (3)
- Lucie Azard (3)
- Lucie Bernardoni (3)
- Davia Martelli (3, 4)
- Capucine Anav (3, 4, 5)
- Kévin Vatant (3, 4, 5)
- Cynthia Brown (3, 4, 5)
- Aurélie Dotremont (4)
- Tara Damiano (4)
- Gautier Preaux (4)
- Kelly Helard (4)
- Nicos (4)
- Hassan (4)
- Stéphane Larue (4)
- Annabelle Baudin (4)
- Antoni Ruiz (4, 5)
- Florian Paris (4, 5)
- Linda Roubine (5)
- Shanna Kress (5)
- Thibault Kuro-Garcia (5)
- Christie Nicora (5)
- Romain Migdalski (5)
- Louise Buffet (5)
- Aurélie Van Daelen (5)
