= Loana Petrucciani =

French reality television personality (1977–2026)

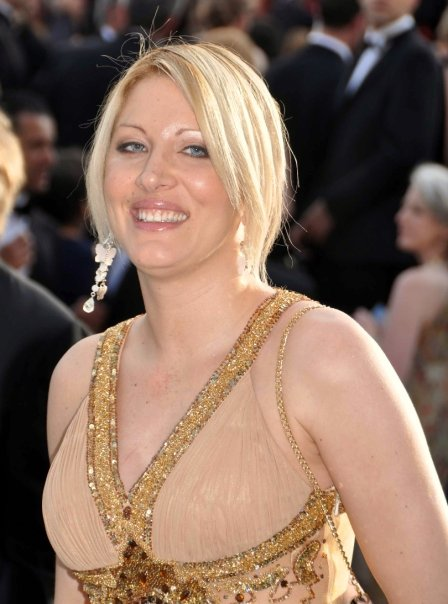
- Loana in 2009
- Born: Loana Petrucciani; 30 August 1977; Cannes, Alpes-Maritimes, France
- Died: 25 March 2026 (aged 48); Nice, Alpes-Maritimes, France
- Other name: Loana
- Occupations: Television presenter; Reality television participant
- Years active: 2001–2019
- Known for: Winner of Loft Story

Loana Petrucciani (30 August 1977 – 25 March 2026) was a French reality television personality known for being the winner of the first French TV reality show, Loft Story, in 2001. As a singer, she released two singles. After a decade of projects and success, she then struggled with addiction and depression for years. She died in March 2026, at the age of 48.
