= Boules sports at the 2009 World Games – Women's raffa doubles =

Boules - women's raffa doubles at the 2009 World Games
- Venue: 228 Memorial Park
- Date: 20-22 July 2009
- Competitors: 12 from 6 nations

Medalists
| 1st place, gold medalist(s) | | Loana Capelli; Elisa Luccarini | Italy |
| 2nd place, silver medalist(s) | | Noeli Dalla Corte; Ingrid Schulz | Brazil |
| 3rd place, bronze medalist(s) | | Deniz Demir; Rukiye Yüksel | Turkey |

The women's raffa doubles event in boules sports at the 2009 World Games took place from 20 to 22 July 2009 at the 228 Memorial Park in Kaohsiung, Taiwan.

== Competition format ==
A total of 6 teams entered the competition. In preliminary round they divided into two groups and played round-robin tournament. From this stage the best two pairs in each group advanced to the semifinals.

== Results ==
=== Preliminary ===
Group A

| Rank | Team | Country | M | W | L | Pts | +/– |
|---|---|---|---|---|---|---|---|
| 1 | Noeli Dalla Corte; Ingrid Schulz | Brazil | 2 | 2 | 0 | 30-17 | +13 |
| 2 | Gabriela Limardo; Natalia Limardo | Argentina | 2 | 1 | 1 | 18-25 | -7 |
| 3 | Cen Weifei; Gao Na | China | 2 | 0 | 2 | 24-30 | -6 |

| Team | Score | Team |
|---|---|---|
| China | 10-15 | Argentina |
| Argentina | 3–15 | Brazil |
| China | 14-15 | Brazil |

Group B

| Rank | Team | Country | M | W | L | Pts | +/– |
|---|---|---|---|---|---|---|---|
| 1 | Loana Capelli; Elisa Luccarini | Italy | 2 | 2 | 0 | 30-4 | +26 |
| 2 | Deniz Demir; Rukiye Yüksel | Turkey | 2 | 1 | 1 | 18-20 | -2 |
| 3 | Chung Yu-Chun; Yang Ta-Ting | Chinese Taipei | 2 | 0 | 2 | 6-30 | -24 |

| Team | Score | Team |
|---|---|---|
| Italy | 15-3 | Turkey |
| Turkey | 15-5 | Chinese Taipei |
| Italy | 15-1 | Chinese Taipei |

=== Finals ===
Semifinals
Brazil | 15
Turkey | 6
Italy | 15
Argentina | 2

Final
Brazil | 6
Italy | 15
Third place
Turkey | 15
Argentina | 11
