= Loft Story (French TV series) =

- Genre: Reality television
- Based on: Big Brother by John de Mol Jr.
- Presented by: Benjamin Castaldi
- Country of origin: France
- Original language: French
- No. of seasons: 2

Production
- Production location: La Plaine Saint-Denis
- Production company: Endemol France

Original release
- Network: M6
- Release: 26 April 2001 – 4 July 2002

Related
- Big Brother; Secret Story

Loft Story was a French reality show, and it is the first French adaptation of Big Brother franchise. The show generally considered is the first of its kind in France. Loft Story presented by Benjamin Castaldi and broadcast on M6 from 26 April 2001 to 5 July 2001 for the first season and from 11 April 2002 to 4 July 2002 for the second season.

The French title of the show is a play-on-words on loft because the contestants are "locked up" in a loft during their adventure, and Love Story.

The initial Loft Story inspired the creation of a similar show of the same name in Quebec. The famous eye logo is used by both Loft Story versions. It evokes the voyeuristic eye of the television viewer as she or he watches the Lofteurs live in front of the cameras. Some of them get gradually voted off the show by viewers on their phones and the last couple win a house.

It caused great controversy in France and the house was attacked by protesters. A limited television series following the creation of the show's first season, titled Culte, premiered in 2024 on Amazon Prime Video.

== History ==
Endemol France was created in January 2001, three months before the start of the TV show Loft Story.

== Production ==
=== Format ===
Loft Story is a slightly re-tooled version of the original Big Brother, toned down slightly for the French market by production company Endemol.

Eleven singles cut off from the outside world and must live in a loft where all rooms (except toilets and a room imposed by the CSA) are equipped with 26 cameras (including 3 infrared cameras, mostly hidden behind one-way mirrors) and microphones. They are filmed 24 hours a day.

=== Broadcast ===
The live stream is slightly delayed on one or more paid channels of the TPS offer, as well as on the Internet during the first season. A daily program is broadcast after editing this live footage.

=== Presentation ===
The show was presented by Benjamin Castaldi. Two hosts co-hosted the live show from the loft: Marie Guillaumond in 2001 and Séverine Ferrer in 2002.

In 2002, during the second season, there was also a show presented by Max and broadcast on Saturday at 23:55 summarizing the events of the week and welcomed the evicted contestants.

== Series overall ==
Seasons	Launch date	Finale date	Days	Housemates	Winner(s)	Grand prize	Average ratings	Ratings share
Loft Story 1	26 April 2001	5 July 2001	71	13	Loana Petrucciani and Christophe Mercy	A house worth 3 million francs	4,900,000	34.6%
Loft Story 2	11 April 2002	4 July 2002	85	13	Thomas Saillofest and Karine Delgado	€250,000 each	4,300,000	31.8%

== Season 1 ==
- Start Date: 26 April 2001
- End Date: 5 July 2001
- The prize: 3,000,000-franc₣ worth house (€450,000)

=== Nominations table ===
All Housemates entered on Day 1 except for Fabrice and Kimy who entered on Day 7 and Day 11 respectively.

	Week 2	Week 3	Week 4	Week 5	Week 6	Week 7	Week 8	Week 10		Nomination points received
	Week 2	Week 3	Week 4	Week 5	Week 6	Week 7	Week 8	Females	Males	Nomination points received
Christophe	Not eligible	Kenza, Laure	Not eligible	4-Julie, 3-Kimy, 2-Laure, 1-Loana	Not eligible	No nominations	No nominations	Male Winner (Day 71)		26
Loana	Steevy, Aziz	Not eligible	5-Jean-Édouard, 4-Christophe, 3-Fabrice, 2-Philippe, 1-Steevy	Not eligible	4-Jean-Édouard, 3-Christophe, 2-Philippe, 1-Fabrice	No nominations	No nominations	Female Winner (Day 71)		10
Jean-Édouard	Not eligible	Kenza, Laure	Not eligible	4-Laure, 3-Kimy, 2-Loana, 1-Julie	Not eligible	No nominations	No nominations	Male Runner-Up (Day 71)		26
Laure	Aziz, Jean-Édouard	Not eligible	5-Philippe, 4-Christophe, 3-Jean-Édouard, 2-Fabrice, 1-Steevy	Not eligible	4-Fabrice, 3-Jean-Édouard, 2-Philippe, 1-Christophe	No nominations	No nominations	Female Runner-Up (Day 71)		14
Fabrice	Not eligible	Kenza, Laure	Not eligible	4-Kimy, 3-Loana, 2-Laure, 1-Julie	Not eligible	No nominations	No nominations	Evicted (Day 57)		16
Kimy	Exempt	Not eligible	5-Christophe, 4-Jean-Édouard, 3-Philippe, 2-Fabrice, 1-Steevy	Not eligible	4-Christophe, 3-Philippe, 2-Fabrice, 1-Jean-Édouard	No nominations	Evicted (Day 50)			12
Philippe	Not eligible	Kenza, Laure	Not eligible	4-Julie, 3-Loana, 2-Laure, 1-Kimy	Not eligible	Evicted (Day 43)				21
Julie	Aziz, Jean-Édouard	Not eligible	5-Christophe, 4-Philippe, 3-Jean-Édouard, 2-Fabrice, 1-Steevy	Not eligible	Evicted (Day 36)					10
Steevy	Not eligible	Kimy, Loana	Not eligible	Evicted (Day 29)						5
Kenza	Aziz, Jean-Édouard	Not eligible	Evicted (Day 22)							4
Aziz	Not eligible	Evicted (Day 15)								4
Delphine	Walked (Day 11)									0
David	Walked (Day 6)									0
Notes	none	none	1	none						
Against public vote	Aziz, Jean-Édouard	Kenza, Laure	Fabrice, Steevy	Julia, Laure, Loana	Fabrice, Philippe	Kimy, Laure, Loana	Christophe, Fabrice, Jean-Édouard	Laure, Loana	Christophe, Jean-Édouard	
Walked	David, Delphine	none								
Evicted	Aziz; 49.6% to save	Kenza; 46% to save	Steevy; 47% to save	Julie; 28.4% to save	Philippe; 49.5% to save	Kimy; 18% to save	Fabrice; 28% to save	Laure; 34% to win	Jean-Édouard; 43% to win	
Evicted	Aziz; 49.6% to save	Kenza; 46% to save	Steevy; 47% to save	Julie; 28.4% to save	Philippe; 49.5% to save	Kimy; 18% to save	Fabrice; 28% to save	Loana; 66% to win	Christophe; 57% to win	

Notes:
- ^Note 1: From now on they will award each Lofteur points, their favourite will receive maximum points and their least favourite will receive one point. The two or more with the fewest points will be up for nomination.

The contestants released a music single under the name 'Les Lofteurs'; 'Up and Down' reached number one in the French charts.

== Season 2 ==
- Start Date: 11 April 2002
- End Date: 4 July 2002
- Prize: €250,000 + €250,000

=== Nominations table ===
All Housemates entered on Day 1 except for Lauryne and Romain who entered on Day 7 and Day 14 respectively.

	Week 3	Week 4	Week 5	Week 6	Week 7	Week 8	Week 9	Week 10	Week 12 Final		Nomination points received
	Week 3	Week 4	Week 5	Week 6	Week 7	Week 8	Week 9	Week 10	Females	Males	Nomination points received
Thomas	6-Karine, 5-Julia, 4-Sandra, 3-Angela, 2-Lesly, 1-Lauryne	Not eligible	5-Karine, 4-Sandra, 3-Lauryne, 2-Angela, 1-Lesly	Not eligible	4-Karine, 3-Lauryne, 2-Sandra, 1-Angela	Not eligible	3-Karine, 2-Angela, 1-Sandra	Not eligible	Male Winner (Day 85)		40
Karine	Not eligible	6-Thomas, 5-Félicien, 4-David, 3-William; 2-Romain, 1-Kamel	Not eligible	5-Thomas, 4-Félicien, 3-Romain, 2-David, 1-Kamel	Not eligible	4-Thomas, 3-Romain, 2-Kamel, 1-David	Not eligible	3-Thomas, 2-Kamel, 1-David	Female Winner (Day 85)		61
David	6-Angela, 5-Karine, 4-Sandra, 3-Lesly, 2-Julia, 1-Lauryne	Not eligible	5-Angela, 4-Lesly, 3-Sandra, 2-Karine, 1-Lauryne	Not eligible	4-Angela, 3-Sandra, 2-Karine, 1-Lauryne	Not eligible	3-Angela, 2-Sandra, 1-Karine	Not eligible	Male Runner-up (Day 85)		49
Angela	Not eligible	6-David, 5-Kamel, 4-Félicien, 3-Romain; 2-Thomas, 1-William	Not eligible	5-David, 4-Kamel, 3-Thomas, 2-Félicien, 1-Romain	Not eligible	4-David, 3-Kamel, 2-Thomas, 1-Romain	Not eligible	3-David, 2-Kamel, 1-Thomas	Female Runner-up (Day 85)		58
Kamel	6-Lesly, 5-Sandra, 4-Angela, 3-Lauryne, 2-Karine, 1-Julia	Not eligible	5-Lesly, 4-Angela, 3-Sandra, 2-Lauryne, 1-Karine	Not eligible	4-Angela, 3-Sandra, 2-Lauryne, 1-Karine	Not eligible	3-Angela, 2-Sandra, 1-Karine	Not eligible	Evicted (Day 71)		48
Sandra	Not eligible	6-David, 5-Kamel, 4-Romain, 3-Félicien; 2-William, 1-Thomas	Not eligible	5-Kamel, 4-David, 3-Thomas, 2-Romain, 1-Félicien	Not eligible	4-Kamel, 3-David, 2-Thomas, 1-Romain	Not eligible	Evicted (Day 64)			52
Romain	6-Lauryne, 5-Lesly, 4-Karine, 3-Sandra, 2-Angela, 1-Julia	Not eligible	5-Karine, 4-Lauryne, 3-Sandra, 2-Angela, 1-Lesly	Not eligible	4-Karine, 3-Lauryne, 2-Angela, 1-Sandra	Not eligible	Evicted (Day 57)				32
Lauryne	Not eligible	6-Kamel, 5-David, 4-Romain, 3-Félicien, 2-Thomas, 1-William	Not eligible	5-Félicien, 4-Thomas, 3-Romain, 2-Kamel, 1-David	Not eligible	Evicted (Day 50)					37
Félicien	6-Angela, 5-Karine, 4-Julia, 3-Lesly, 2-Sandra, 1-Lauryne	Not eligible	5-Karine, 4-Lauryne, 3-Sandra, 2-Angela, 1-Lesly	Not eligible	Evicted (Day 43)						30
Lesly	Not eligible	6-Kamel, 5-Romain, 4-David, 3-Félicien, 2-Thomas, 1-William	Not eligible	Evicted (Day 36)							32
William	6-Julia, 5-Karine, 4-Sandra, 3-Angela, 2-Lauryne, 1-Lesly	Not eligible	Evicted (Day 29)								8
Julia	Not eligible	Evicted (Day 22)									19
Marlene	Walked (Day 7)										0
Against public vote	Julia, Lauryne	Thomas, William	Angela, Lesly	David, Kamel, Félicien, Romain	Angela, Karine, Lauryne, Sandra	Romain, Thomas	Karine, Sandra	David, Kamel, Thomas	Angela, Karine	David, Thomas	
Walked	Marlene	none									
Evicted	Julia; 42% to save	William; 17% to save	Lesly; 30% to save	Félicien; 24% to save	Lauryne; 21% to save	Romain; 42% to save	Sandra; Fewest votes to save	Kamel; Fewest votes to save	Angela; 49.58% to win	David; 48.71% to win	
Evicted	Julia; 42% to save	William; 17% to save	Lesly; 30% to save	Félicien; 24% to save	Lauryne; 21% to save	Romain; 42% to save	Sandra; Fewest votes to save	Kamel; Fewest votes to save	Karine; 50.42% to win	Thomas; 51.29% to win	

== Criticism ==
Loft Story became a craze when it was screened, but as it went on, it became extremely criticized, mocked and belittled by the media: the premise of ordinary young people being filmed most of the time in a cozy loft (and letting themselves out, they got a reputation of being stupid), being voted off by people on phones and getting to win money at the end, got it called high-rated "garbage tv".

Loft Story is considered to be the precursor of reality shows in France where the contestants get voted off by viewers.

Like other Big Brother-style programs, the show's sexual content was criticized as several contestants were seen having intercourse on camera.

== See also ==
- Culture of France
- List of French television series
- List of French adaptations of television series from other countries
- Reality television
