= Je suis une célébrité, sortez-moi de là! =

- Genre: Reality television
- Based on: I'm a Celebrity...Get Me Out of Here!
- Presented by: Jean-Pierre Foucault (1); Christophe Dechavanne (2); Laurence Boccolini (2)
- Country of origin: France
- Original language: French
- No. of seasons: 2

Production
- Production locations: Teresópolis, Brazil (2006); Blyde River Canyon, South Africa (2019)
- Running time: 60 mins (live regular); 120 mins (live premiere)
- Production companies: Endemol France (season 1); ITV Studios France (season 2)

Original release
- Network: TF1
- Release: 14 April 2006 – 20 August 2019

Je suis une célébrité, sortez-moi de là! is a French television reality show presented by Jean-Pierre Foucault who was joined by Christophe Dechavanne in the first season, and Laurence Boccolini for the second. The first season was broadcast live in the early evening on TF1 from 14 April to 28 April 2006. It is the French version of the international reality show I'm a Celebrity...Get Me Out of Here!. The first season took place in Teresópolis, Brazil. The second season was pre-recorded in South Africa, at the same location used primarily by the Australian series, and aired in the summer of 2019.

== Series overview ==
Winners crowned King or Queen of their respective year.

Key:

King of the Jungle
Queen of the Jungle

Season	Start date	End date	Days in camp	Campmates	Honour places		
Season	Start date	End date	Days in camp	Campmates	Winner	Second place	Third place
1	14 April 2006	28 April 2006	16	12	Richard Virenque	Filip Nikolic	Loana
2	9 July 2019	20 August 2019	22	11	Gérard Vivès	Frédérick Bousquet	Capucine Anav

== Series results ==
Key
Winner – King or Queen of the Jungle
Runner-up
Third place
Late arrival
Evicted
Withdrew

=== Season 1 (2006) ===
12 contestants participated in series 1.

Celebrity	Famous for	Entered	Exited	Finished
Richard Virenque	Cyclist legend	Day 1	Day 16	1st
Filip Nikolic	Former 2Be3 singer & actor	Day 1	Day 16	2nd
Loana	TV personality, author & singer	Day 1	Day 16	3rd
Marielle Goitschel	2 Time Olympic Champion	Day 1	Day 16	4th
Charles-Philippe d'Orléans	Anjou Duke	Day 1	Day 15	5th
Benjamin Bove	TV Presenter & Model	Day 1	Day 15	6th
Indra	Singer & actress	Day 1	Day 14	7th
Omar Harfouch	Billionaire Entrepreneur	Day 1	Day 13	8th
Satya Oblet	International Model	Day 1	Day 11	9th
Delphine de Turckheim	TV Presenter	Day 1	Day 11	10th
Agnès Soral	Star of Stage & Screen	Day 1	Day 10	11th
Sonia Dubois	TV Presenter & author	Day 1	Day 9	12th

=== Season 2 (2019) ===
11 contestants (5 women and 6 men) participated in series 2.

Celebrity	Famous for	Entered	Exited	Finished
Gérard Vivès	Actor & Television presenter	Day 1	Day 22	1st
Frédérick Bousquet	Freestyle & butterfly swimmer	Day 1	Day 22	2nd
Capucine Anav	Television personality & comedian	Day 1	Day 22	3rd
Giovanni Bonamy	International model & influencer	Day 1	Day 22	4th
Candice Pascal	Danse avec les stars dancer	Day 1	Day 21	5th
Nilusi Nissanka	Former Kids United singer & actress	Day 1	Day 18	6th
Brahim Asloum	Light Flyweight Gold medal boxer	Day 1	Day 15	7th
Sloane	Singer & former Peter et Sloane member	Day 1	Day 12	8th
Alexandra Rosenfeld	Miss France & Miss Europe 2006	Day 1	Day 9	9th
Frédéric Longbois	The Voice singer & actor	Day 1	Day 6	10th
Julien Lepers	Former Questions pour un Champion host	Day 1	Day 3	11th
