= Je suis une célébrité, sortez-moi de là ! season 1 =

Je suis une célébrité, sortez-moi de là !
- Season 1
- Presented by: Jean-Pierre Foucault and Christophe Dechavanne
- No. of days: 16
- No. of contestants: 12
- Winner: Richard Virenque
- Runner-up: Filip Nikolic
- Location: Teresópolis, Brazil

Release
- Original network: TF1
- Original release: 14 April – 28 April 2006

Season chronology
- Next → Season 2

The first series of Je suis une célébrité, sortez-moi de là !, the French version of I'm a Celebrity...Get Me Out of Here!, began on 14 April 2006 and ended on 28 April 2006. The programme ran for 14 days (16 days if counting the day the celebrities arrived and the morning the finalists exited). The series was won by Richard Virenque.

The program began well, having a peak viewership of 8.5 million when it premiered on 14 April 2006. However, by the end of the series the show had only a peak viewership of 7 million, which resulted in the show being discontinued for 13 years until its return in 2019.

== Celebrities ==
The show began with 12 celebrity contestants.

Celebrity	Known for	Status
Richard Virenque	Retired road racing cyclist	Winner on 28 April 2006
Filip Nikolic	Former 2Be3 singer & actor	Runner-up on 28 April 2006
Loana Petrucciani	Loft Story winner, model & singer	Third place on 28 April 2006
Marielle Goitschel	Olympic alpine skier	Eliminated 9th on 28 April 2006
Charles-Philippe d'Orléans	Duke of Anjou	Eliminated 8th on 27 April 2006
Benjamin Bove	Model & television presenter	Eliminated 7th on 27 April 2006
Indra	Singer & actress	Eliminated 6th on 26 April 2006
Omar Harfouch	Pianist, composer & businessman	Eliminated 5th on 25 April 2006
Satya Oblet	International model	Eliminated 4th on 24 April 2006
Delphine de Turckheim	Television presenter & actress	Eliminated 3rd on 23 April 2006
Agnès Soral	Stage & screen actress	Eliminated 2nd on 22 April 2006
Sonia Dubois	Former television presenter & author	Eliminated 1st on 21 April 2006

== Results and elimination ==
Indicates that the celebrity was in the bottom
Indicates that the celebrity was safe from elimination
Indicates the winner celebrity
Indicates the runner-up celebrity
Indicates that the celebrity received the fewest votes
Indicates that the celebrity was eliminated
Indicates that the celebrity withdrew

	Day 9	Day 10	Day 11	Day 12	Day 13	Day 14	Day 15	Day 16 The Final
Richard Virenque	Safe	Safe	Safe	Safe	Safe	Safe	Safe	Winner (Day 16)
Filip Nikolic	Safe	Safe	Safe	Safe	Safe	Safe	4th	Second place (Day 16)
Loana Petrucciani	Safe	Safe	Safe	Safe	Safe	Safe	Safe	Third place (Day 16)
Marielle Goitschel	Safe	10th	Safe	Safe	7th	Safe	Safe	Fourth place (Day 16)
Charles-Philippe d’Orléans	Safe	Safe	Safe	Safe	Safe	Safe	5th	Eliminated (Day 15)
Benjamin Bove	Safe	Safe	Safe	8th	Safe	6th	6th	Eliminated (Day 15)
Indra	Safe	Safe	9th	Safe	Safe	7th	Eliminated (Day 14)	
Omar Harfouch	11th	Safe	Safe	Safe	8th	Eliminated (Day 13)		
Satya Oblet	10th	Safe	Safe	9th	Eliminated (Day 12)			
Delphine de Turckheim	Safe	Safe	10th	Eliminated (Day 11)				
Agnès Soral	Safe	11th	Eliminated (Day 10)					
Sonia Dubois	12th	Eliminated (Day 9)						

== Bushtucker Trials ==
The contestants take part in daily trials to earn food. The participants are chosen by the public (Day 1–8) and the production (Day 9–16).

Total amount of Bushtucker Trials the celebrities took part in:

Richard	Filip	Loana	Marielle	Charles- Philippe	Benjamin	Indra	Omar	Satya	Delphine	Agnès	Sonia
9	9	11	7	6	7	4	2	3	3	2	2
