= Je suis une célébrité, sortez-moi de là ! season 2 =

Je suis une célébrité, sortez-moi de là !
- Season 2
- Presented by: Laurence Boccolini; Christophe Dechavanne
- No. of days: 22
- No. of contestants: 11
- Location: Kruger National Park, South Africa

Release
- Original network: TF1
- Original release: 9 July – 20 August 2019

Additional information
- Filming dates: March 2019

Season chronology
- ← Previous; Season 1

The second series of Je suis une célébrité, sortez-moi de là !, the French version of I'm a Celebrity...Get Me Out of Here!, premiered on 9 July 2019.

This season was different from the first, as the mode of elimination was no longer entrusted to the public. The show was won by Gérard Vivès.

== Celebrities ==
The program began with 11 celebrity contestants.

Celebrity	Known for	Status
Gérard Vivès	Actor & TV host	Winner on 20 August 2019
Frédérick Bousquet	Freestyle & butterfly swimmer	Runner-up on 20 August 2019
Capucine Anav	Television personality	Third place on 20 August 2019
Giovanni Bonamy	International model & influencer	Eliminated 8th on 20 August 2019
Candice Pascal	Danse avec les stars pro dancer	Eliminated 7th on 20 August 2019
Nilusi Nissanka	Former Kids United singer & actress	Eliminated 6th on 13 August 2019
Brahim Asloum	Light Flyweight Gold medal boxer	Eliminated 5th on 6 August 2019
Sloane	Former Peter et Sloane member	Eliminated 4th on 30 July 2019
Alexandra Rosenfeld	Miss France & Miss Europe 2006	Eliminated 3rd on 23 July 2019
Frédéric Longbois	The Voice singer & actor	Eliminated 2nd on 18 July 2019
Julien Lepers	Former Questions pour un Champion host	Eliminated 1st on 9 July 2019

== Results and elimination ==
Indicates that the celebrity was in the bottom
Indicates that the celebrity was safe from elimination
Indicates the winner celebrity
Indicates the runner-up celebrity
Indicates that the celebrity received the fewest votes
Indicates that the celebrity was eliminated
Indicates that the celebrity withdrew
