= Harfouch =

Harfouch is a surname. Notable people with the surname include:

- Corinna Harfouch (born 1954), German actress
- Omar Harfouch (born 1969), Lebanese entrepreneur
- Walid Harfouch (born 1971), international television manager, producer, and public figure

== See also ==
- Harfush clan, Lebanon
