= MedEspoir =

Franco-Tunisian medical tourism company

- Industry: Medical services
- Founded: 2009
- Headquarters: Tunis, Tunisia
- Owner: Aymen Boujbel
- Website: www.medespoir.com

MedEspoir is a Franco-Tunisian medical tourism company founded in 2009. Its purpose is organising surgical trips for the general public in Tunisia. MedEspoir was founded by Aymen Boujbel, who is the chairman and CEO. MedEspoir was created in response to the demand of plastic surgery throughout the world, although the company also organises trips for other types of surgery.

MedEspoir's official slogan is "Invest in your health, quality has a price".

== Activity ==
MedEspoir's medical center, the MedEspoir Clinic, specialises in the conception and realisation of medical stays in different practices.These include plastic and reconstructive surgery, facial surgery, body surgery such as abdominoplasty and breast surgery. Eye surgery for alternative solutions to vision correction with glasses, dental treatments such as dental implants, dental veneers, and crowns, and Bariatric surgery, commonly known as obesity surgery, are also offered.

MedEspoir is a popular choice for nephrology patients from the Maghreb and sub-Saharan Africa regions. MedEspoir has expanded its range of health tourism destinations in recent years by offering services in Turkey and Egypt.

== Media ==
MedEspoir and its activities have been the subject of numerous media reports in various countries. Programs on M6, NRJ 12, France3, TF1, W9 and RTS have offered viewers an overview of patient care. These reports explored the motivations of patients and showed in detail the stages of the medical stay in Tunisia and Turkey. The media, particularly French, also mentioned MedEspoir for its strong commitment to supporting reality TV stars. Personalities such as Benjamin Macé, Loana, Smaïl or Nadege Lacroix have participated in programs or videos related to MedEspoir Clinic.
