= Secret Story (French TV series) season 7 =

Secret Story
- Season 7
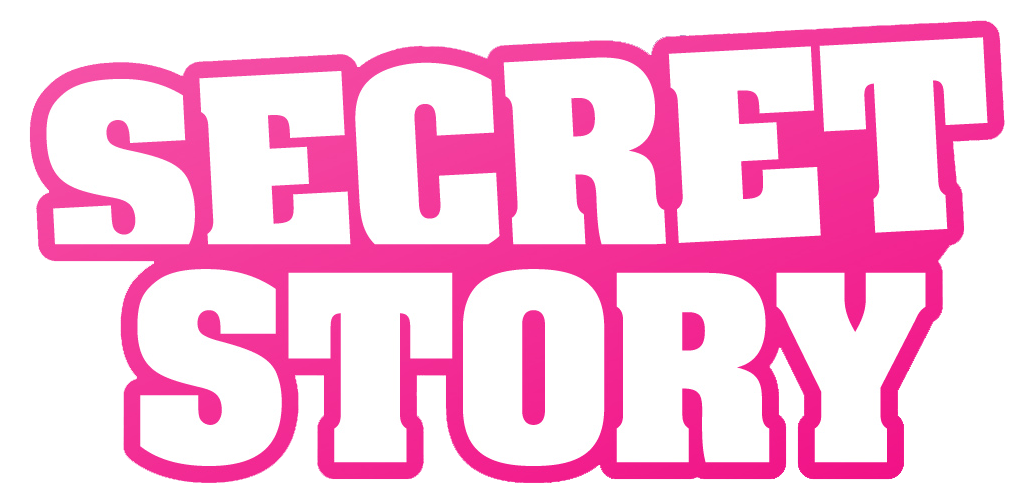
- Presented by: Benjamin Castaldi; Adrien Lemaître (After Secret)
- No. of days: 101
- No. of housemates: 17
- Winner: Anaïs
- Runner-up: Gautier
- Companion shows: Before Secret; After Secret

Release
- Original network: TF1
- Original release: 7 June – 13 September 2013

Season chronology
- ← Previous; Season 6 Next → Season 8

Secret Story 7 is the seventh season of the French reality television series Secret Story, a show which is based loosely on the international Big Brother format. Casting for this season opened on 24 August 2012. The season began on 7 June 2013 and will finish airing on 13 September 2013, with all episodes airing on TF1, as in previous years. The format of Before Secret this season was alike the concept used in the fourth edition.

Benjamin Castaldi returned to host the main show and Adrien Lemaître returned to host the spin-off show After Secret, with Nadège Lacroix (winner of the sixth season of the show) as his new co-host.

== Housemates ==
=== Alexia ===
- Alexia's secret is: "I lived 14 years with my paralyzed twin". She entered on Day 3. She finished in third place on Day 101.

=== Anaïs ===
- Anaïs is 25. She comes from Marseille, France and shares her secret with Ben, Julien and Sonia : "We are family of viewers". She entered on Day 1. She won the series on Day 101.

=== Ben ===
- Ben is 48. He shares his secret with Anaïs, Julien and Sonia : "We are family of viewers". He entered on Day 1. He walked on Day 21.

=== Clara ===
- Clara's secret is that she is the daughter of an 80's artist. She entered on Day 3. She was evicted on Day 87.

=== Eddy ===
- Eddy is a male/female model. He entered on Day 3. He was evicted on Day 73.

=== Émilie ===
- Émilie is a private detective. She entered on Day 3. She was evicted on Day 66.

=== Florine ===
- Florine has the ability of communicating with animals as secret. She entered on Day 3. She was evicted on Day 94.

=== Gautier ===
- Gautier is "the common secret of the housemates" therefore he is the solution to the first mystery of the seven this season. He entered on Day 3. He became the runner up on Day 101.

=== Guillaume ===
- Guillaume's secret is that he "sold himself on the Internet". He entered on Day 3. He was evicted on Day 59.

=== Jamel ===
- Jamel is 23. He lives in UK and his secret is : "I grew up in a slum". He entered on Day 3. He was evicted on Day 52.

=== Julien ===
- Julien is 21. He is a model and shares his secret with Anaïs, Ben and Sonja : "We are family of viewers". He entered on Day 1. He was evicted on Day 94.

=== Mickaël ===
- Mickaël's secret: "I survived to a shark attack". He entered on Day 3. He was evicted on Day 10.

=== Morgane ===
- Morgane shares her secret with Sabrina and their secret is : "We are twins". She entered on Day 10. She was evicted on Day 31.

=== Sabrina ===
- Sabrina shares her secret with Morgane and their secret is : "We are twins". She entered on Day 3. She was evicted on Day 38.

=== Sonja ===
- Sonja is 36. She shares her secret with Anaïs, Ben and Julien : "We are family of viewers". She entered on Day 1. She was evicted on Day 45.

=== Tara ===
- Tara is 22. She is a beautician and shares her secret with Vincent : "We are the masters of the nominations". She entered on Day 3. She was evicted on Day 17.

=== Vincent ===
- Vincent shares his secret with Tara: "We are the masters of the nominations". He entered on Day 3. He finished in fourth place on Day 101.

== Houseguests ==
=== Amélie ===
- Amélie Neten participated to Secret Story 4 in 2010. She entered in this season as a guest on Day 80, on the Secret House and quit on Day 87.

=== Daniel ===
- Daniel MKongo participated to Secret Story 5 in 2011 with the secret to be a fake couple with Ayem. He entered in this season as a guest on Day 87 and qui on Day 92.

=== Julien ===
- Julien participated to Secret Story 6 in 2012. He entered in this season as a guest on Day 87 and quit on Day 92.

=== Marie ===
- Marie Garet, winner of Secret Story 5 in 2011, entered in this season as a guest on Day 80, on the Secret Room with Vincent and Stephanie. On Day 83, she join the Secret House and quit on Day 87.

=== Stéphanie ===
- Stéphanie Clerbois, finalist of Secret Story 4 in 2010, entered in this season as a guest on Day 80, on the Secret Room with Vincent. On Day 85, Stephanie and Vincent join the Secret House as a couple. On Day 87, La Voix announce that Stepahnie can continue one more week his relation with Vincent, she quit the House on Day 92.

== Secrets ==
| Nom | Age | Country | Secret | Discovered by | Status |
|---|---|---|---|---|---|
| Anaïs | 25 | France | "We are the viewers' family" (w/ Julien, Ben and Sonja) | Vincent (Day 17) | Winner |
| Gautier | 24 | France | "I am the common secret of all the housemates" | Guillaume (Day 12) | Finalist |
| Vincent | 23 | Portugal | "We are the masters of the nominations" (w/ Tara) | Gautier (Day 43) | Finalist |
| Alexia | 23 | France | "I lived 14 years with my parasite twin" | - | Finalist |
| Julien | 21 | France | "We are the viewers' family" (w/ Anaïs, Ben and Sonja) | Vincent (Day 17) | Semi-finalist (Day 94) |
| Florine | 28 | France | "I communicate with animals" | Eddy (Day 70) | Semi-finalist (Day 94) |
| Clara | 18 | France | "My father is a famous singer from the 80's" | Undiscovered | Evicted (Day 87) |
| Eddy | 20 | France | "I am a male/female model" | Anaïs (Day 45) | Evicted (Day 73) |
| Émilie | 24 | France | "I'm a private detective" | Undiscovered | Evicted (Day 66) |
| Guillaume | 23 | France | "I sold myself on the web" | Undiscovered | Evicted (Day 59) |
| Jamel | 23 | United Kingdom | "I grew up in a slum" | Undiscovered | Evicted (Day 52) |
| Sonja | 36 | France | "We are the viewers' family" (w/ Anaïs, Ben and Julien) | Vincent (Day 17) | Evicted (Day 45) |
| Sabrina | 20 | France | "My twin sister is in the house" (w/ Morgane) | Gautier (Day 11) & Julien (Day 38) | Evicted (Day 38) |
| Morgane | 20 | France | "My twin sister is in the house" (w/ Sabrina) | Gautier (Day 11) & Julien (Day 38) | Evicted (Day 31) |
| Ben | 48 | France | "We are the viewers' family" (w/ Anaïs, Julien and Sonja) | Vincent (Day 17) | Walked (Day 21) |
| Tara | 22 | France | "We are the masters of the nominations" (w/ Vincent) | Undiscovered | Evicted (Day 17) |
| Mickaël | 21 | France | "I survived a shark attack" | Undiscovered | Evicted (Day 10) |

== Weekly summary ==
Weekly summary
Week 1
| Week 1 | Secrets | "I am the common secret of all the housemates" - Gautier's secret, revealed on Day 3.; "We are the family of the viewers" - Anaïs, Ben, Julien and Sonja's secret, revealed on Day 1.; "I communicate with animals" - Florine's secret, revealed on Day 3.; "We are the masters of nominations" - Tara and Vincent's secret, revealed on Day 3.; "We are twins" - Morgane and Sabrina's secret, revealed on Day 3.; "My father is a famous singer from the 80s"; "I sold myself on the web"; "I lived 14 years with my parasite twins"; "I am a male/female model"; "I survived a shark attacl"; "I grew in a slum"; "I am a private detective" |
| Week 1 | Tasks | On Day 3, during the live launch, Anaïs received a secret mission. She had to be angry when Sonja enters the house and leave it immediately. |
| Week 1 | Twists | On Day 1, Anaïs, Ben, Julien and Sonja entered the two "Before Secret's Houses". They will have to share a secret, chosen by the public : "We are the family of the viewers". Ben and Sonja will have to play the parents while Anaïs and Julien have to play the children's - which means they are fake brother and sister.; On Day 2, Anaïs and Julien met blindfolded in a dinner.; On Day 3, Gautier entered the House. He is the link between all the housemates. In fact, he is the one that gave them the envelopes that confirmed their entries in the house. All the housemates had to discover what is the link between all of them in order to enter in the house, otherwise they will have to live in the garden all the week.; On Day 3, it was revealed to Anaïs, Ben, Julien and Sonja that Sonja will actually be Anaïs and Julien's fake stepmother.; Morgane and Sabrina are twins. But, only one of them could enter the house on day 3, while the other would enter the house next week. They had to choose which one of them would enter the first. Sabrina entered the first while Morgane was sent abroad.; On Day 3, Tara and Vincent were named the "Masters of Nominations." Each week, they will have to nominate automatically a housemate in addition to the housemates nominated by the others housemates.; On Day 3, it was revealed that the housemate who found the link between all of them - which is Gautier - will win a place in finale.; On Day 3, Ben and Sonja, as the older housemates of the house, had access to the "Hut of love" while the others housemates slept outside in the garden.; On Day 5, even if nobody found out that Gautier is the link between all of them, all the housemates could have access to the house, but "La Voix" said "A danger is hanging over your heads."; This week, all the housemates have to search the link between all of them.; On Day 7, Eddy and Jamel went to a new room: "The Waiting Room". They had to wait until further notice. An hour later, "La Voix" gave them a clue for this week link's task, which is "You know the answer".; On Day 7, as nobody found out the link between all of them, this week all the housemates are up for eviction.; On Day 8, the housemates found a safe hidden in the garden, which contained a map of Paris, with red dots which are all the places where Gautier gave the Secret Pass to the housemates.; On Day 9, Anaïs, Ben, Julien and Sonja won a quiz of general knowledge. They won another clue on this week link's task: "The worm is in the apple". |
| Week 1 | Entrances | Anaïs, Ben, Julien and Sonja entered on Day 1.; Alexia, Clara, Eddy, Emilie, Florine, Gautier, Guillaume, Jamel, Mickaël, Sabrina, Tara and Vincent entered the house on Day 3.; Anaïs returned to the house on Day 4. |
| Week 1 | Exits | On Day 3, during the live launch, Anaïs had to leave the house. She went in a secret house near in order to make her task more realistic.; On Day 3, Morgane was sent abroad in order to protect her and Sabrina's secret.; On Day 10, Mickaël became the first person to be evicted with only 1.42% to save (1.96% for Sabrina, 2.22% for Guillaume, 94.4% for the others housemates, the split was not revealed). |
| Week 2 | Task | On Day 17, Sonja receives a secret mission. She has to seduce Sonja for €10000. She succeeds on Day 24 and wins €10000. |
| Week 2 | Twists | On Day 10, Guillaume and Sonja see a video full of clues for Gautier's secret.; On Day 10, Tara wins, as the investigator of the week, the right to have a clue for the link's task, but she has to take €5000 from somebody's pot. She chooses Julien and she finds a motorcycle helmet, which is Gautier's.; On Day 10, as nobody found that Gautier's the link between all of them, he won a place in finale.; On Day 10, Gautier finds half of Morgane and Sabrina's secret, which is "We are twins".; On Day 12, "La Voix" reveal to all the housemates that Gautier won the place in finale.; On Day 14, Guillaume finds Gautier's secret, which is "I am the common secret of all the housemates". However, he doesn't win Gautier's place in finale.; On Day 14, Tara and Vincent nominate Anaïs.; On Day 14, Anaïs, Morgane, Tara and Sonja face the public vote.; On Day 17, Vincent finds Anaïs, Ben, Julien and Sonja's secret. |
| Week 2 | Punishments | On Day 15, Clara reveals her secret to Gautier. She then loses her pot and is automatically nominated the next week. |
| Week 2 | Entrance | Morgane entered the house on Day 10. |
| Week 2 | Exits | On Day 17, Tara became the second person to be evicted with 12,81% to save (17,26% for Sonja, 17,8% for Morgane, 52,12% for Anaïs) |
| Week 3 | Twists | On Day 17, Eddy and Gautier went in the "Waiting Room". They had to choose if their fellow housemates could see their friends or not. At the end, they won €55,000 (€27,500 each). They chose to put Alexia, Emilie, Guillaume, Jamel and Vincent's secrets in danger by revealing clues.; On Day 20, Vincent nominated Ben.; On Day 20, Eddy and Vincent won access to the "Showromm of secrets".; On Day 21, Guillaume, Julien and Vincent got nominated, alongside Ben and Clara.; On Day 21, during the live nominations revelations, Ben expresses his wish to leave the house.; On Day 22, Ben walked from the house, which means that this week's nominations are cancelled.; On Day 23, Florine is elected "Miss Secret Story 7". |
| Week 3 | Entrances | On Day 24, Emilie and Vincent went to the Secret Room. |
| Week 3 | Exits | On Day 21, Ben walked from the house.; On Day 24, Emilie and Vincent went to the Room with 51,72%, while Gautier and Sonja got 37,59% and Guillaume and Morgane 10,69%. |
| Week 4 | Tasks | On Day 25, "La Voix" gives Eddy and Jamel a secret mission. They have to make the others housemates believe that they are in love.; On Day 29, Emilie and Vincent had to make believe to the others housemates that they became a couple. |
| Week 4 | Twists | On Day 24, Sonja had the choice between two presents. The one she chose got her automatically nominated for this prime's eviction. She then had to choose one of the boys for having a dinner. She chose Vincent.; On Day 24, Gautier had to choose between keeping his place in finale or winning €50000. He chose the money, which means that the place in finale is lost.; On Day 24, Morgane had to choose between winning €25000 or giving to all the housemates letters from home. She chose the letters.; On Day 24, Eddy or Clara, one of them will see his/her mother and it's down to Gautier. He chose Clara.; On Day 24, Sonja and Vincent find out that they are nominated for this prime's eviction. Sonja has to choose two girls, and Vincent two boys that will join them. Sonja chose Emilie and Morgane, while Vincent chose Gautier and Guillaume. What the housemates don't know about this prime's eviction is that none of them will go home but a duo will go in the Secret Room, it's either Emilie-Vincent, Gautier-Sonja or Guillaume-Morgane. Emilie and Vincent then went to the Secret Room.; On Day 27, Vincent nominated Florine.; On Day 28, Alexia and Sabrina got nominated alongside Florine and Clara, nominated on Day 15. But, Emilie and Vincent, in the Secret Room, switched Alexia with Morgane by using the "Last Word Cart". That means that, this week, the housemates up for evictions are Clara, Florine, Morgane and Sabrina.; On Day 28, "La Voix" reveal to the housemates that Emilie and Vincent didn't got evicted and that they are in a Secret Room. |
| Week 4 | Exit | On Day 31, Morgane became the third person to be evicted with 8% of the public vote (10% for Sabrina, 18% for Florine and 64% for Clara) |
| Week 5 | Twists | On Day 31, Florine's team (composed of herself, Jamel, Emilie, Guillaume, Sonja, Clara and Morgane) gave €10000 for having the place in finale for one of them.; On Day 31, Julien accepts a place in finale, but he then automatically nominated his team, except himself, so Alexia, Anaïs, Eddy, Gautier, Sabrina and Vincent.; On Day 32, Florine has the choice : she can have a dinner with her mother but she then will have to replace a girl and a boy from the nominees, with a girl and a boy of her team.; On Day 33, Florine switched Anaïs with Sonja and Vincent with Jamel.; On Day 33, Vincent nominated Guillaume.; On Day 33, this week's housemates up for eviction are Alexia, Eddy, Jamel, Gautier, Guillaume, Sabrina and Sonja. |
| Week 5 | Exit | On Day 38, Sabrina became the fourth person to be evicted, with 7,76% of the public vote to save (7,96 for Sonja, 8,03 for Guillaume, 76,25 for the other, split not revealed). |
| Week 6 | Tasks | On Day 38, "La Voix" gave Guillaume a secret mission. He had to make the others housemates believe that he is virgin. |
| Week 6 | Twists | On Day 38, Florine had the choice. She could allow Jamel to see his mother, or allow Sonja to see her mother and win €20000. She chose Jamel to see his mother.; On Day 38, Vincent had the choice to either immune Alexia or Emilie. He chose to immune Emilie.; On Day 41, Vincent nominated Sonja.; On Day 42, Alexia and Anaïs got nominated alongside Sonja.; On Day 44, Gautier found Vincent's secret. |
| Week 6 | Exit | On Day 45, Sonja became the fifth person to be evicted with 13,9% to save (29,97% for Anaïs and 56,13% for Anaïs) |
| Week 7 | Tasks | On Day 45, "La Voix" gave Florine and Guillaume a secret mission. They had to make believe that Guillaume finally had sex, with Florine, and that he turns out to be the best partner Florine ever had. |
| Week 7 | Twists | On Day 45, Anaïs, Eddy, Emilie, Florine and Sonja went in another house, called "The immune house" while the other house is the "nomination house".; On Day 45, Clara had to choose either Emilie or Gautier to be nominated. She chose Gautier, that means that Emilie and Gautier switched house.; On Day 45, in order to see her mother, Alexia had to send Eddy in the nomination house, and Guillaume in the immune house. She accepted.; On Day 45, Anaïs has to choose if she wants to destroy Julien's place in finale. She accepted.; On Day 45, Vincent had to choose which house he wants to make immune. He chose the big house, that means that Anaïs, Florine, Gautier and Guillaume are automatically nominated as Sonja got evicted a few minutes after.; On Day 48, Emilie can switch Gautier and Jamel. She accepts, that means that Gautier got immune while Jamel got automatically nominated.; On Day 49, Julien can switch Anaïs and Vincent. He accepts, that means that Anaïs got immune while Vincent got automatically nominated.; On Day 49, the finally housemates up for evictions are Florine, Guillaume, Jamel and Vincent. |
| Week 7 | Punishments | On Day 50, Florine reveals her and Guillaume's secret mission to Jamel. Florine and Guillaume then lose all their pots. |
| Week 7 | Exit | On Day 52, Jamel became the sixth person to be evicted with 10,60% to save (12,44% for Florine, 26,64% for Guillaume and 49,32% for Vincent) |
| Week 8 | Twists | On Day 52, Gautier and Jamel chose to immune Florine instead of Guillaume.; On Day 52, Gautier had the choice to either immune Clara but divide his pot. He refused.; On Day 52, all the housemates – except Florine - chose to nominate Jamel instead of Eddy.; On Day 52, Anaïs had the choice to permit Julien to see his father, or Vincent to see his mother. She chose Vincent.; On Day 55, Gautier and Clara went into the "Secret maze". The first to finish it win a power regarding the nominations. Gautier won the right to switch one of the nominees with another.; On Day 56, Alexia, Clara and Guillaume got nominated alongside Emilie. Gautier switched Clara with Julien, that means that this week nominations are Alexia, Emilie, Guillaume and Julien.; On Day 57, Vincent won clues on Alexia's secret.; On Day 58, Eddy and Florine won clues on Guillaume's secret, and Florine won a free buzz. |
| Week 8 | Punishment | On Day 55, as Emilie revealed her secret to Clara and Florine, she got automatically nominated. |
| Week 8 | Exit | On Day 59, Guillaume became the seventh person to be evicted with 10% of the vote to save (13% for Emilie, 38% for Julien and 39% for Alexia) |
| Week 9 | Twists | On Day 59, Eddy picked up the red phone. "La Voix" asked him if he wanted to know if he's loved on the outside. He said yes. Then "La Voix" said that he was automatically nominated.; On Day 59, Clara could switch her pot with Gautier's. She accepted, that means that Clara finally have €89054 while Gautier have €1800.; On Day 59, Anaïs had the choice. She can switch Eddy with Julien and then nominate Julien, or she could change nothing. She changed nothing which means that Eddy remained nominated.; On Day 59, Guillaume permitted to Florine and Gautier to go in the showroom of the secrets. They chose to have clues on Alexia's secret.; On Day 59, Eddy could give his nomination to either Alexia or Anaïs. He chose Alexia which means that she is automatically nominated, but Eddy is no longer nominated.; On Day 61, Anaïs and Florine received the "Inversely Card" which can inverse the nomines. They chose not to use it.; On Day 63, Clara and Emilie got nominated alongside Alexia. |
| Week 9 | Exit | On Day 66, Emilie became the eighth person to be evicted with 25,86% of the vote to save (32,28% for Clara, 41,86% for Alexia). |
| Week 10 | Tasks | |
| Week 10 | Twists | On Day 66, Alexia and Vincent, with "La Voix" planned a fake and ridiculous marriage. Then "La Voix" revealed the joke, saying that the Alexia and Vincent had to make them believe also that they were waiting twins. Alexia and Vincent won €10000 each.; On Day 66, Clara and Emilie had the choice: take a revenge and nominate either Anaïs or Florine. They chose to nominate Anaïs.; On Day 66, Gautier had the choice: become the Master of Nominations and chose the nominees but divide Clara's pot or do nothing. He chose to be the Master of Nominations. |
| Week 10 | Exit | |

== Nominations table ==
| | Week 1 | Week 2 | Week 3 | | Week 4 | Week 5 | Week 6 | Week 7 | Week 8 | Week 9 | Week 10 | Week 12 | Week 13 | Week 14 Final | |
| | Week 1 | Week 2 | Day 21 | Day 24 | Week 4 | Week 5 | Week 6 | Week 7 | Week 8 | Week 9 | Week 10 | Week 12 | Week 13 | Week 14 Final | |
|---|---|---|---|---|---|---|---|---|---|---|---|---|---|---|---|
| Anaïs | No; Nominations | Nominated | ~~Vincent~~; ~~Guillaume~~ | Not; Eligible | Not; Eligible | Saved | Not; Eligible | Immune; House | Clara; Guillaume | Not; Eligible | Julien | Not; Eligible | No; Nominations | Winner (Day 101) | |
| Gautier | No; Nominations | Sonja; Morgane | Exempt | Nominated | Alexia; Sabrina | Nominated | Anaïs; Alexia | Immune; House | Alexia; Guillaume | Émilie; Anaïs | Eddy; Vincent | Nominated | No; Nominations | Runner-Up (Day 101) | |
| Alexia | No; Nominations | Not; Eligible | ~~Julien~~; ~~Guillaume~~ | Not; Eligible | Saved | Nominated | Not; Eligible | Immune; House | Clara; Guillaume | Nominated | Julien | Not; Eligible | Exempt | Third Place (Day 101) | |
| Vincent | ~~Ben~~ | Anaïs | ~~Ben~~ | Gautier; Guillaume | Florine; Morgane | Guillaume | Sonja | Nomination; House | Clara; Guillaume | Émilie; Clara | Julien | Clara; Gautier | No; Nominations | Fourth Place (Day 101) | |
| Julien | No; Nominations | Tara; Morgane | Not; Eligible | Not; Eligible | Sabrina; Morgane | Exempt | Clara; Florine | Immune; House | Clara; Guillaume | Clara; Émilie | Alexia; Vincent | Not; Eligible | No; Nominations | Evicted (Day 94) | |
| Florine | No; Nominations | Not; Eligible | ~~Julien~~; ~~Vincent~~ | Not; Eligible | Nominated | Jamel; Sonja | Not; Eligible | Nomination; House | Alexia; Julien | Not; Eligible | Not; Eligible | Exempt | No; Nominations | Evicted (Day 94) | |
| Clara | No; Nominations | Not; Eligible | ~~Eddy~~; ~~Julien~~ | Not; Eligible | Nominated | Exempt | Not; Eligible | Immune; House | Alexia; Julien | Not; Eligible | Not; Eligible | Nominated | Evicted (Day 87) | Guest (Days 94-100) | |
| Eddy | No; Nominations | Clara; Morgane | Not; Eligible | Not; Eligible | Morgane; Sabrina | Nominated | Clara; Florine | Immune; House | Clara; Guillaume | Clara; Émilie | Julien | Evicted (Day 73) | | Guest (Days 94-100) | |
| Émilie | No; Nominations | Not; Eligible | ~~Julien~~; ~~Vincent~~ | Nominated | Morgane | Exempt | Exempt | Immune; House | Alexia; Julien | Not; Eligible | Evicted (Day 66) | | | | |
| Guillaume | No; Nominations | Sabrina; Morgane | Not; Eligible | Nominated | Alexia; Sabrina | Nominated | Anaïs; Alexia | Nomination; House | Alexia; Julien | Evicted (Day 59) | | | | | |
| Jamel | No; Nominations | Sonja; Morgane | Not; Eligible | Not; Eligible | Alexia; Sonja | Nominated | Anaïs; Alexia | Nomination; House | Evicted (Day 52) | | | | | Guest (Days 94-100) | |
| Sonja | No; Nominations | Not; Eligible | ~~Eddy~~; ~~Jamel~~ | Émilie; Morgane | Not; Eligible | Nominated | Nominated | Evicted (Day 45) | | | | | | | |
| Sabrina | No; Nominations | Not; Eligible | ~~Vincent~~; ~~Guillaume~~ | Not; Eligible | Not; Eligible | Nominated | Evicted (Day 38) | | | | | | | | |
| Morgane | Not in House | Not; Eligible | ~~Jamel~~; ~~Guillaume~~ | Nominated | Nominated | Evicted (Day 31) | | | | | | | | | |
| Ben | No; Nominations | Tara; Morgane | ~~Nominated~~ | Walked (Day 21) | | | | | | | | | | | |
| Tara | ~~Ben~~ | Anaïs | Evicted (Day 17) | | | | | | | | | | | Guest (Days 94-100) | |
| Mickaël | No; Nominations | Evicted (Day 10) | | | | | | | | | | | | | |
| Up for eviction | All housemates | Anaïs; Morgane; Sonja; Tara | ~~Ben~~; ~~Clara~~; ~~Guillaume~~; ~~Julien~~; ~~Vincent~~ | Émilie, Vincent; Morgane, Gautier; Sonja, Guillaume | Clara; Florine; Morgane; Sabrina | Alexia; Eddy; Gautier; Guillaume; Jamel; Sabrina; Sonja | Alexia; Anaïs; Sonja | Florine; Guillaume; Jamel; Vincent | Alexia; Émilie; Julien; Guillaume | Alexia; Clara; Émilie | Alexia; Anaïs; Eddy; Julien; Vincent | Clara; Gautier | Anaïs; Florine; Gautier; Julien; Vincent | Alexia; Anaïs; Gautier; Vincent | |
| Nomination Notes | 1, 2 | 1 | 1, 3, 4, 5 | 6 | 1, 4, 7 | 1, 8 | 1, 9 | 10 | 11, 12, 13 | 14 | 15, 16, 17 | 18, 19, 20 | 21 | none | |
| Walked | none | | Ben | none | | | | | | | | | | | |
| Evicted | Mickaël; 1.42% to save | Tara; 12.81% to save | Eviction; Cancelled | Émilie; Vincent; 51.72% to fake evict | Morgane; 8% to save | Sabrina; 7.71% to save | Sonja; 13.9% to save | Jamel; 11.6% to save | Guillaume; 10% to save | Émilie; 25.86% to save | Eddy; 14.12% to save | Clara; 46.17% to save | Julien; 18.32% to save | Vincent; 7.39% to win | Alexia; 10.45% to win |
| Evicted | Mickaël; 1.42% to save | Tara; 12.81% to save | Eviction; Cancelled | Émilie; Vincent; 51.72% to fake evict | Morgane; 8% to save | Sabrina; 7.71% to save | Sonja; 13.9% to save | Jamel; 11.6% to save | Guillaume; 10% to save | Émilie; 25.86% to save | Eddy; 14.12% to save | Clara; 46.17% to save | Florine; 5.41% to save | Gautier; 30.36% to win | |
| Saved | Guillaume; 2.22% Sabrina; 1.96% | Anaïs; 52.12% Morgane; 17.81% Sonja; 17.26% | Eviction; Cancelled | Sonja; Gautier; 37.59% Morgane; Guillaume; 10.69% | Clara; 64% Florine; 18% Sabrina; 10% | Guillaume; 7.98% Sonja; 7.90% | Alexia; 56.13% Anaïs; 29.97% | Vincent; 49.32% Guillaume; 26.64% Florine; 12.44% | Alexia; 39% Julien; 38% Émilie; 13% | Alexia; 41.86% Clara; 32.28% | Julien; 28.27% Anaïs; 20.28% Alexia; 19.47% Vincent; 17.33% | Gautier; 53.83% | Anaïs; 32.62% Vincent; 23.27% Gautier; 20.38% | Anaïs; 51.8% to win | |

=== Notes ===
- ^Note 1: Tara and Vincent were the "Masters of Nominations" and had the ability to add one nominee of their choice in the list of the nominees of the week. This power works until the power is discovered.
- ^Note 2: Nobody discovered Gautier's secret, being in common to all the housemates, so all the housemates were nominated.
- ^Note 3: Gautier held a free pass to the final, and therefore was immune from nominating and being nominated.
- ^Note 4: By revealing her secret, Clara was nominated automatically.
- ^Note 5: In Week 3, nominations are cancelled after Ben walked out the game.
- ^Note 6: Some housemates were nominated to enter in the Secret Room.
- ^Note 7: Vincent and Émilie had the power to switch one original nominee. They saved Alexia and switched it by Morgane.
- ^Note 8: Two clans are opposed: the clan of Florine and the clan of Anaïs. The clan of Anaïs is automatically nominated because Julien choose a place in final. But, Florine must switch one girl and one boy of her clan for one girl and one boy from Anaïs's clan to meet her mother.
- ^Note 9: Vincent has to choose between two boxes, with Alexia and Émilie names. He had to choose one of the boxes, and the one that he chose will be immune. He chose Émilie's box, meaning she is immune.
- ^Note 10: This week the housemates are divided into two houses: the Immunity House and the Nomination House. Between the week, there were opportunities to swamp houses. On Tuesday, the ones who were in the Nomination House were nominated, meaning that Florine, Guillaume, Jamel and Vincent are up for eviction this week.
- ^Note 11: Gautier and Jamel had to give immunity to a housemate. They decided to give the immunity to Florine.
- ^Note 12: Émilie was automatically nominated for reveal clues from her secret.
- ^Note 13: Gautier won the right to save one of the nominees, and replace with other. He could not save Émilie, as she was automatically nominated. He decided to save Clara and replace her with Julien.
- ^Note 14: Eddy answered the red phone, and is automatically nominated. Then, Anaïs had the power to swamp Eddy with Julien, or not. She decided to don't do that, so Eddy is still automatically nominated. Then, Eddy had the power to swamp him with either Anaïs or Alexia. He decided to swamp with Alexia, meaning she's automatically nominated this week.
- ^Note 15: This week the girls are immune. But, one of them has to be automatically nominated. Clara and Émilie had to automatically nominate either Anaïs or Florine. They decided to nominate Anaïs.
- ^Note 16: In Week 10, Gautier and Julien are the Kings of Nominations. First, they to nominate 2 housemates between Alexia, Florine and Eddy. The one who they don't chose will be immune. They nominated Alexia and Eddy, meaning that Florine is immune. In the next day, they had to nominate either Clara and Vincent. They decided to nominate Vincent, meaning Clara is immune.
- ^Note 17: As nominees, Alexia, Anaïs, Eddy and Vincent can choose to nominate automatically one of the responsible of their nominations between Gautier and Julien. They decided to nominate Julien, meaning Gautier is immune.
- ^Note 18: Vincent has an ultimatum: he has to convalide his cagnotte more €50.00. If he accepts, there will be no nominations, and he will be evicted, but if he doesn't accepts, all housemates will be up for eviction. He accepted the ultimatum. But, instead of being evicted, Vincent will move to the Secret Room on Friday.
- ^Note 19: Stephanie (SS4) as to decide to either automatically nominate Alexia, or to give immunity to Florine. She decided to give immunity to Florine.
- ^Note 20: This week Vincent has the power to nominate 2 housemates. He nominated Clara and Gautier, meaning they are up for eviction.
- ^Note 21: Alexia won the ticket to the final. However, he has a dilemma: Alexia, you can choose to take all the money of Vincent's account, and give to him the ticket place or keep your ticket place and doesn't win more money. She decided to keep the ticker. Therefore, she is the first finalist, and the other 5 are automatically nominated. It will be a double eviction.

== Nominations totals received ==
| | Week 1 | Week 2 | Week 3 | Week 4 | Week 5 | Week 6 | Week 7 | Week 8 | Week 9 | Week 10 | Week 11 | Week 12 | Week 13 | Week 14 | Total |
|---|---|---|---|---|---|---|---|---|---|---|---|---|---|---|---|
| Anaïs | – | – | – | 0 | – | 3 | – | 0 | 1 | – | – | 0 | – | Winner | 4 |
| Gautier | – | – | 0 | – | – | – | – | 0 | – | – | – | 1 | – | Runner-Up | 1 |
| Alexia | – | 0 | – | 3 | – | 3 | – | 5 | – | – | – | 0 | – | 3rd Place | 11 |
| Vincent | – | – | 3 | – | – | – | – | 0 | – | – | – | – | – | 4th Place | 3 |
| Julien | – | – | 3 | – | – | – | – | 4 | – | – | – | 0 | – | Evicted | 7 |
| Florine | – | 0 | – | – | – | 2 | – | – | 0 | – | – | – | – | Evicted | 2 |
| Clara | – | 1 | – | – | – | 2 | – | 5 | 3 | – | – | 1 | Evicted | | 12 |
| Eddy | – | – | 1 | – | – | – | – | 0 | – | – | Evicted | | | | 1 |
| Émilie | – | 0 | – | – | – | – | – | – | 4 | Evicted | | | | | 4 |
| Guillaume | – | – | 4 | – | – | – | – | 6 | Evicted | | | | | | 10 |
| Jamel | – | – | 2 | – | – | – | – | Evicted | | | | | | | 2 |
| Sonja | – | 2 | – | 1 | – | – | Evicted | | | | | | | | 3 |
| Sabrina | – | 1 | – | 4 | – | Evicted | | | | | | | | | 5 |
| Morgane | Not in H | 6 | – | 2 | Evicted | | | | | | | | | | 8 |
| Ben | – | – | – | Walked | | | | | | | | | | | 0 |
| Tara | – | 2 | Evicted | | | | | | | | | | | | 2 |
| Mickaël | – | Evicted | | | | | | | | | | | | | 0 |

Automatically nominated.
Not Eligible to be up for eviction.
Not in House.
No nominations.

=== Nominations: Results ===
| Weeks | Nominated | Evicted |
|---|---|---|
| Week 1 | Alexia, Anaïs, Ben, Clara, Eddy, Emilie, Florine, Gautier, Jamel, Julien, Sonja, Tara, Vincent, Guillaume (2,22 %), Sabrina (1,96 %), Mickaël (1,42 %) | Mickaël |
| Week 2 | Anaïs (52,12%), Morgane (17,81%), Sonja (17,26%), Tara (12,81%) | Tara |
| Week 3 | Cancelled | Ben |
| Week 4 | Clara (64%), Florine (18%), Morgane (8%), Sabrina (10%) | Morgane |
| Week 5 | Alexia (21.63%), Eddy (11.25%), Gautier (34.51%), Guillaume (7.98%), Jamel (9.02%), Sabrina (7.71%), Sonja (7.90%) | Sabrina |
| Week 6 | Alexia (56.13%), Anaïs (29.97%), Sonja (13.9%) | Sonja |
| Week 7 | Florine (12.44%), Guillaume (26.64%), Jamel (11.60%), Vincent (49.32%) | Jamel |
| Week 8 | Alexia (39%), Émilie (13%), Guillaume (10%), Julien (38%) | Guillaume |
| Week 9 | Alexia (41,66%), Clara (32,28%), Émilie (25,86%) | Émilie |
| Week 10 | Alexia (19,47%), Anaïs (20,82%), Eddy (14,12%), Julien (28,27%), Vincent (17,33%) | Eddy |
| Week 11 | No Nominations | |
| Week 12 | Clara (46,17%), Gautier (53,83%) | Clara |
| Week 13 | Anaïs (32,62%), Florine (5,41%), Gautier (20,38%), Julien (18,32%), Vincent (23,27%) | Florine, Julien |
| Week 14 - Finale | Alexia (10,45%), Anaïs (51,8%), Gautier (30,36%), Vincent (7,39%) | |

== Ratings ==
=== Prime time ===
| Show N° | Day | Viewers | Ratings Share |
|---|---|---|---|
| 1 - Launch | Friday, June 7 | 3 305 000 | 15,5% |
| 2 | Friday, June 14 | 2 075 000 | 22,4% |
| 3 | Friday, June 21 | 1 700 000 | 19,4% |
| 4 | Friday, June 28 | 2 039 000 | 18% |
| 5 | Friday, July 5 | 1 645 000 | 20,8% |
| 6 | Friday, July 12 | 1 558 000 | 22,2% |
| 7 | Friday, July 19 | 1 727 000 | 25% |
| 8 | Friday, July 26 | 1 831 000 | 21,3% |
| 9 | Friday, August 2 | 1 980 000 | 21,6% |
| 10 | Friday, August 9 | 1 915 000 | 20,6% |
| 11 | Friday, August 16 | 1 939 000 | 21,4% |
| 12 | Friday, August 23 | 2 125 000 | 25,8% |
| 13 | Friday, August 30 | 2 024 000 | 22,4% |
| 14 | Friday, September 6 | 2 034 000 | 25,6% |
| 15 - Finale | Friday, September 13 | 2 100 000 | 28% |

=== After Secret ===
| Show N° | Day | Viewers | Ratings Share |
|---|---|---|---|
| 1 | Friday, June 14 | 1 200 000 | 29,7% |
| 3 | Friday, June 21 | 1 000 000 | 25,9% |
| 4 | Friday, June 28 | | |
| 5 | Friday, July 5 | | |
| 6 | Friday, July 12 | | |
| 7 | Friday, July 19 | | |
| 8 | Friday, July 26 | | |
| 9 | Friday, August 2 | | |
| 10 | Friday, August 9 | | |

=== Live ===
| Show N° | Day | Viewers | Ratings Share |
|---|---|---|---|
| 1 | Friday, June 7 | 770 000 | 25% |
