= Walid Harfouch =

Lebanese-Ukrainian television manager

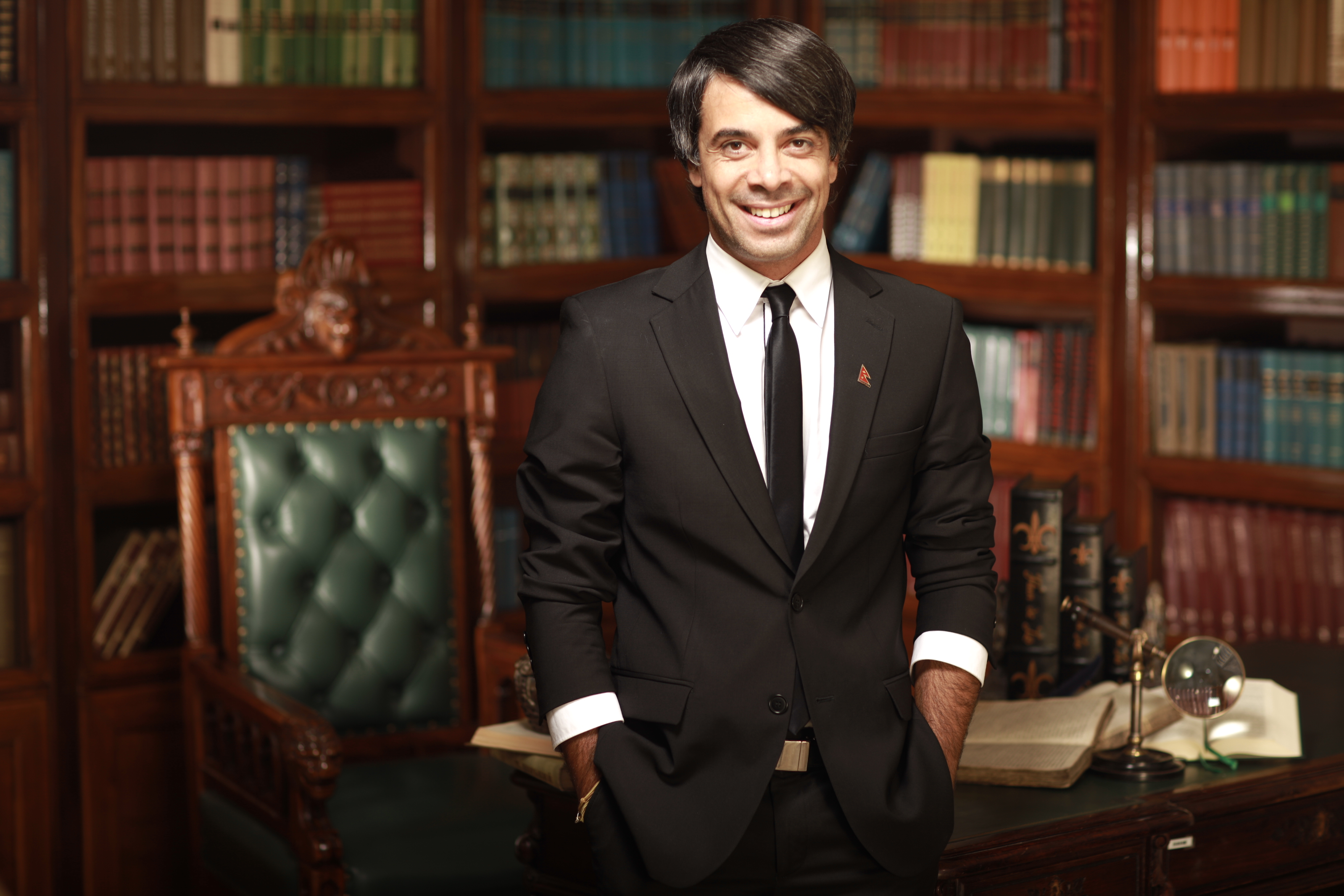
- Born: 10 April 1971 (age 55); Tripoli, Lebanon
- Citizenship: Ukrainian
- Title: Vice President of Euronews; President of HDFashion & LifeStyle

Walid Harfouch is an international television manager, producer and public figure. He serves as the Vice President of the international TV channel Euronews, President of the HD Fashion & Lifestyle TV channel, and co-founder of the Super-Nova radio station and the Paparazzi magazine.

In August 2011, Harfouch initiated the Ukrainian version of the Euronews TV channel.

He is recognized as the first United Nations Goodwill Ambassador authorized to combat AIDS in Ukraine and is the founder of the NGO "SOS Racism!"

For over 10 years, Walid Harfouch has been dedicatedly practicing yoga.

== Biography ==
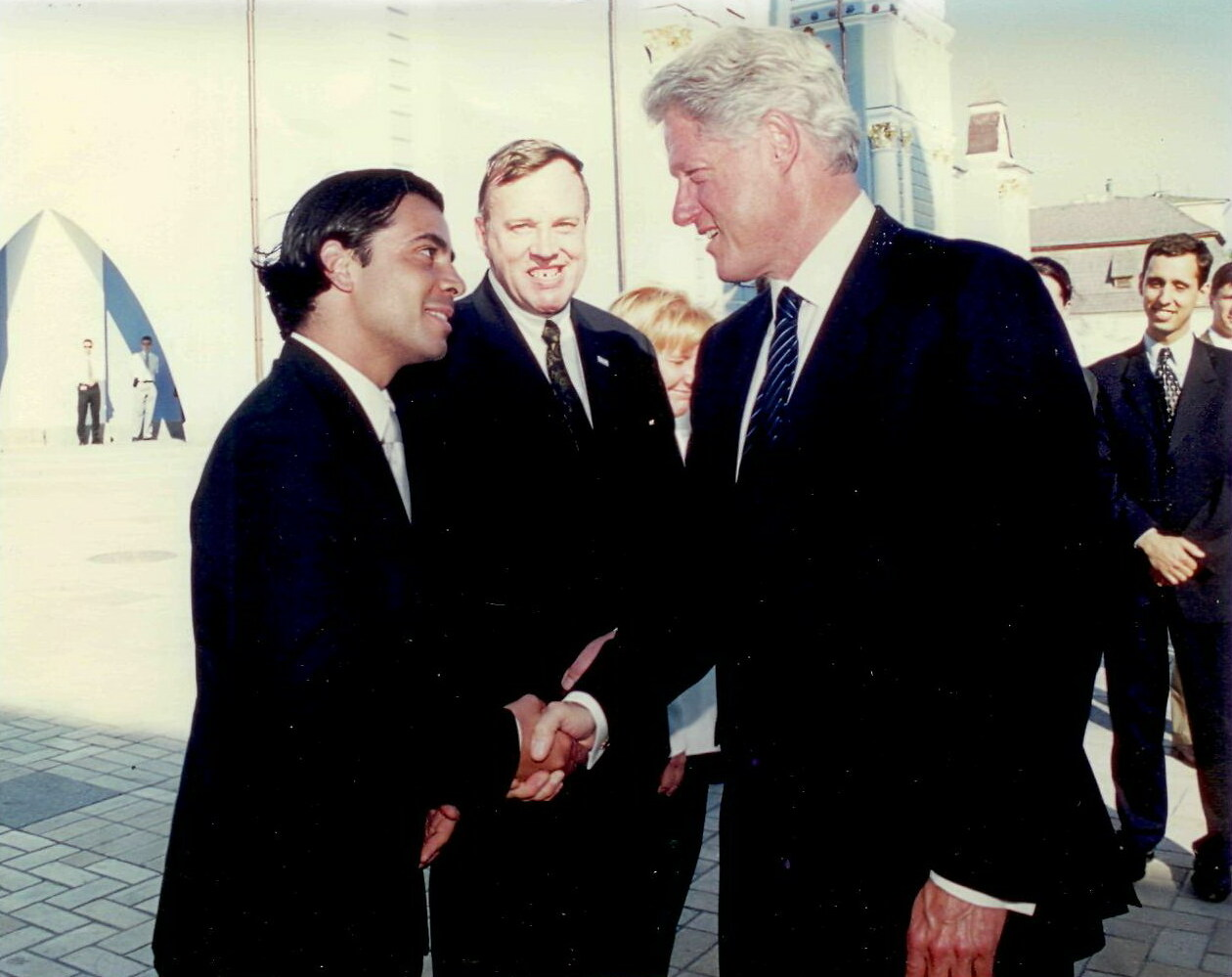
During an official visit by Bill Clinton to Ukraine, 1995

Walid Harfouch was born on 10 April 1971 in Tripoli, Lebanon. His father is Adnan Harfouch, a professor of Arabic literature, and his mother, Najwa El Hajj, a school director. He has an elder brother, Omar and a sister, Hind.

In 1988, Harfouch completed his education at the college des Freres. Subsequently, in 1990, his brother Omar invited him to Ukraine. The following year, he was admitted into the Faculty of Journalism at the Oles Honchar Dnipro National University.

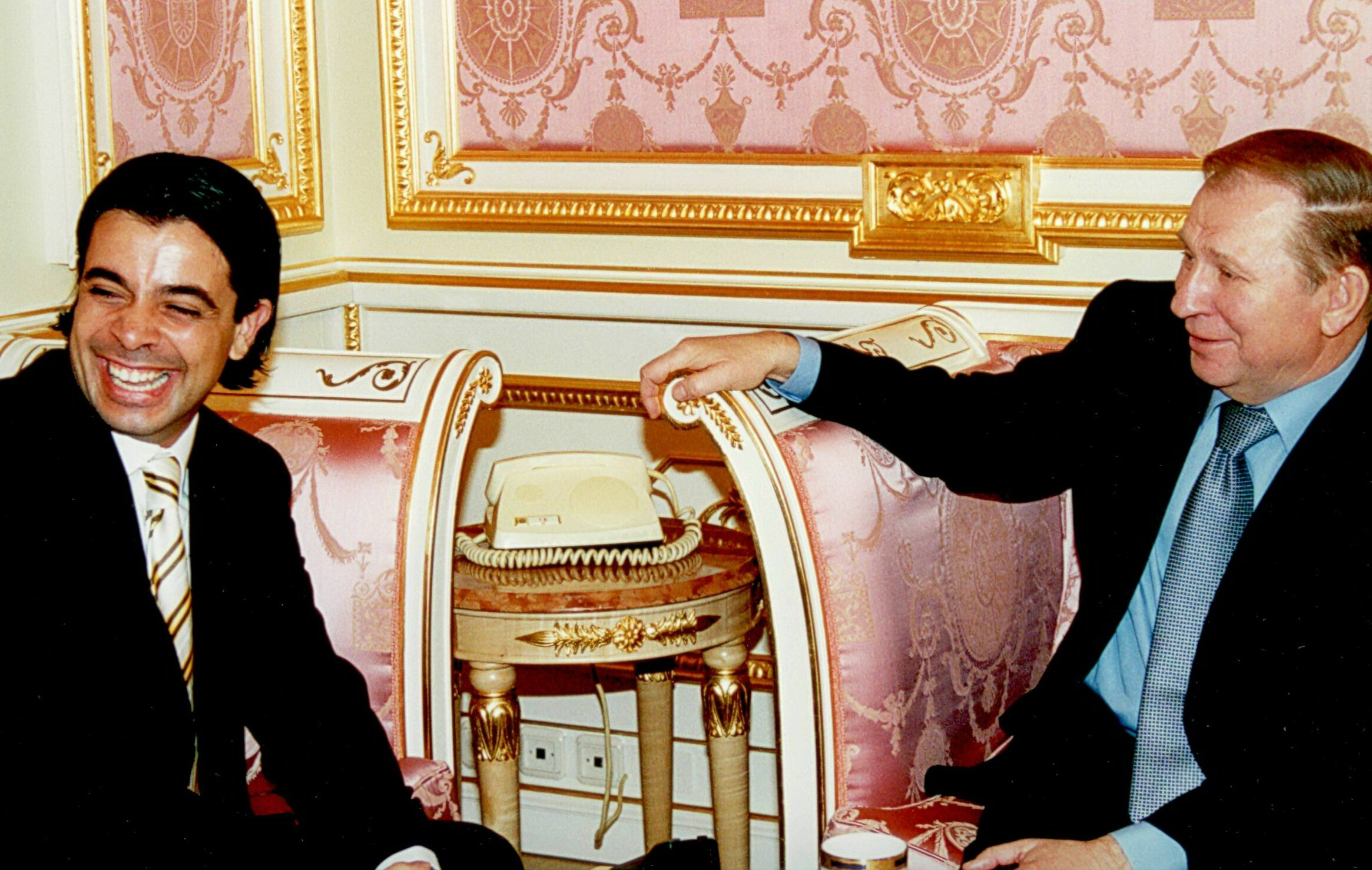
Walid Harfouch with Leonid Kuchma, 1997

In 1995, Harfouch relocated to Kiev, where he ventured into the media sector.

During 2003, Harfouch and his brother launched the Paparazzi magazine, focusing on the lives of show business celebrities and policymakers.

Additionally, in 2005, he published the book "Sex, Murder, a Million".

In 2006, Harfouch and his brother acquired the rights to organize three Miss Europe beauty contests. The first of these took place in October 2006 in Kyiv at the National Palace "Ukraine" and was broadcast in 12 European countries. Notably, 34 contestants from various European countries participated in the competition "Miss Europe - 2006", with Ukraine represented by Olena Avramenko who secured the title of the first vice-miss of Europe.

== Television ==
=== TET TV channel ===
In August 2007, Harfouch assumed the role of the general producer of TET TV channel, one of Ukraine's earliest private TV channels. His key objectives in this capacity were to enhance the channel's ratings, broaden its audience base, and revitalize its programming with new shows like Miss CIS.

=== First national channel ===
Between March 2010 and June 2013, Walid Harfouch served as the Deputy General Director of the Ukrainian public broadcaster NTKU. Overseeing the development of music and entertainment projects, as well as establishing international collaborations for the First National.

=== Euronews and other channels ===
In October 2010, Harfouch took on the role of the President of the Coordinating Council of the Ukrainian version of Euronews.

On 2 August 2011, in Lyon, Euronews and Harfouch, representing NTKU, jointly announced the official launch of the Ukrainian edition of Euronews with the support of the Deputy Prime Minister of Ukraine, Borys Kolesnikov, and with guidance from Ukrainian deputy Anna German. With Harfouch assistance, a fully-fledged Ukrainian version of Euronews was launched on 24 August.

During June 2013, Harfouch assumed the leadership of Euronews across various CIS countries.

In 2017, Harfouch took over the HD Fashion & Lifestyle TV channel.

Subsequently, in 2019, he transitioned to the position of Vice President of the international TV channel Euronews.

== Radio ==
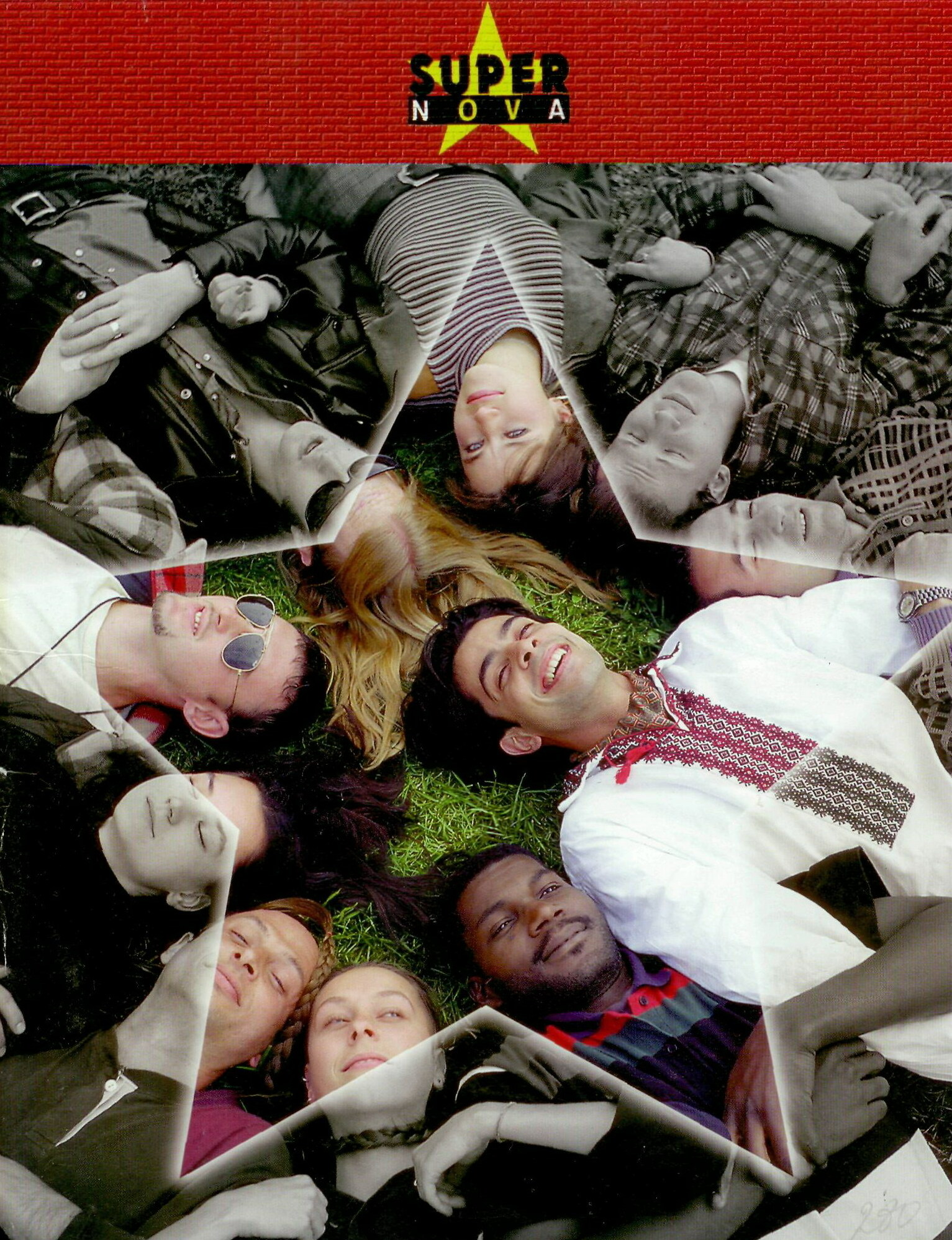
Walid Harfouch - An international team at radio Super Nova

In 1995, Harfouch and his brother Omar departed from Dnipro to Kyiv where they founded one of the first FM radio stations, SuperNova. The collaboration with Radio France International (RFI) enabled broadcasts in French, English, and Arabic, as well as Russian and Ukrainian. The radio swiftly gained popularity, actively participating in all cultural domains of the country, often initiating cultural events. Over the years, it became an iconic station among the youth in Kyiv, primarily due to its vibrant parties. The station collaborated directly with the French Institute in Ukraine and the French embassy in Ukraine. Super-Nova was the first in Ukraine to provide live coverage of the Cannes International Film Festival.

== Social activity ==
=== Kyiv Zoo ===
Kyiv Zoo In 1995, a public initiative, "Girl for Boy," organized by Walid and radio "Super-Nova," sought to transport a partner for the only elephant in the Kyiv Zoo, named Boy. The funds raised from a charity ball for the elephant facilitated the procurement of a companion from Germany.

=== United Nations Goodwill Ambassador ===
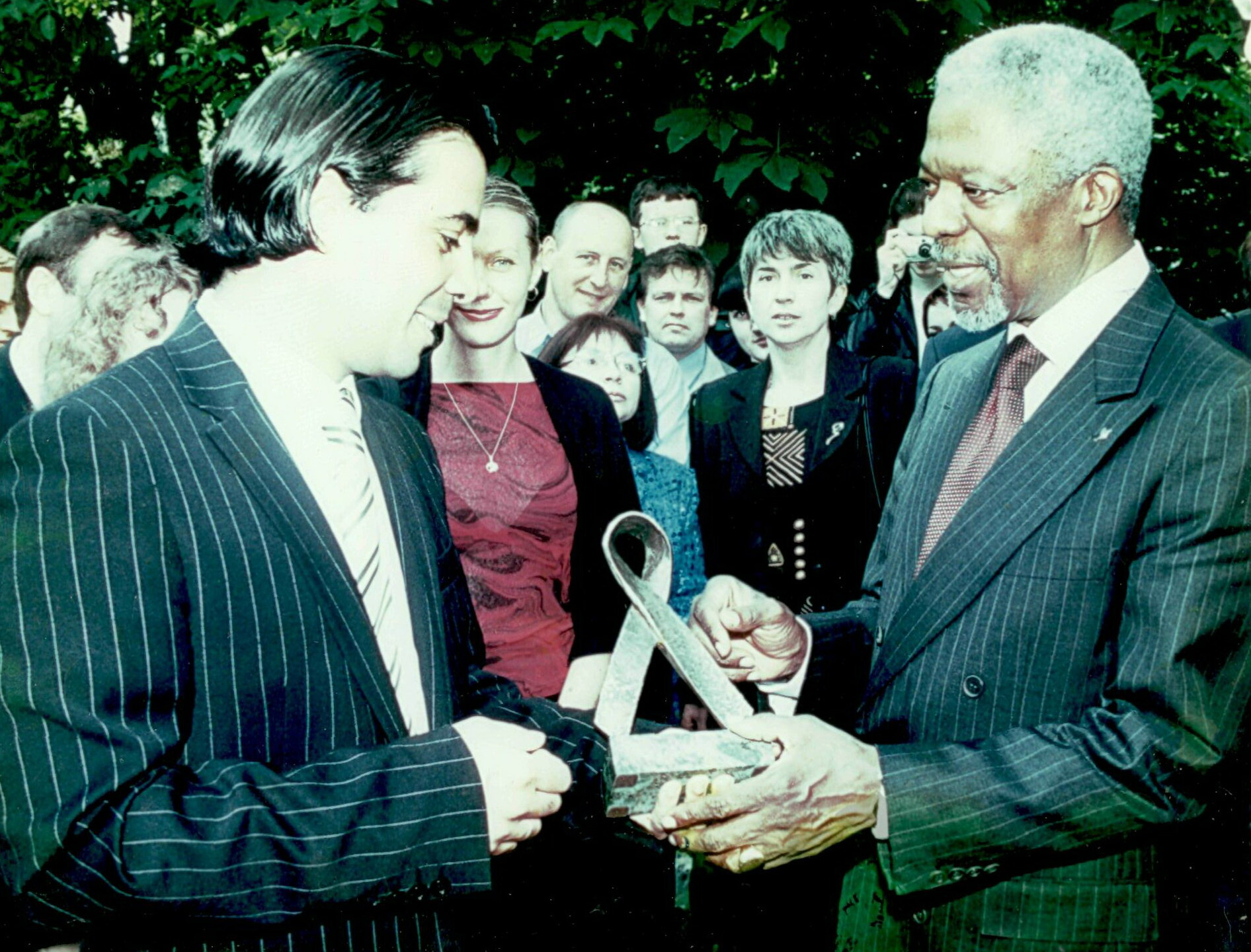
Walid Harfouch presents UN Secretary-General Kofi Annan, a symbolic sign of the Red Tape, 2002

In 2000, Walid Harfouch became the first UN Goodwill Ambassador to combat AIDS under the UNAIDS program. He played a significant role in the establishment of a bronze monument in memory of AIDS, victims, inaugurated with the presence of the then UN Secretary General Kofi Annan. Consequently, the song "Protect Life," composed by Omar Harfouch and produced by Walid, became renowned as the anthem of the anti-AIDS in Ukraine.

=== SOS! Racism! ===
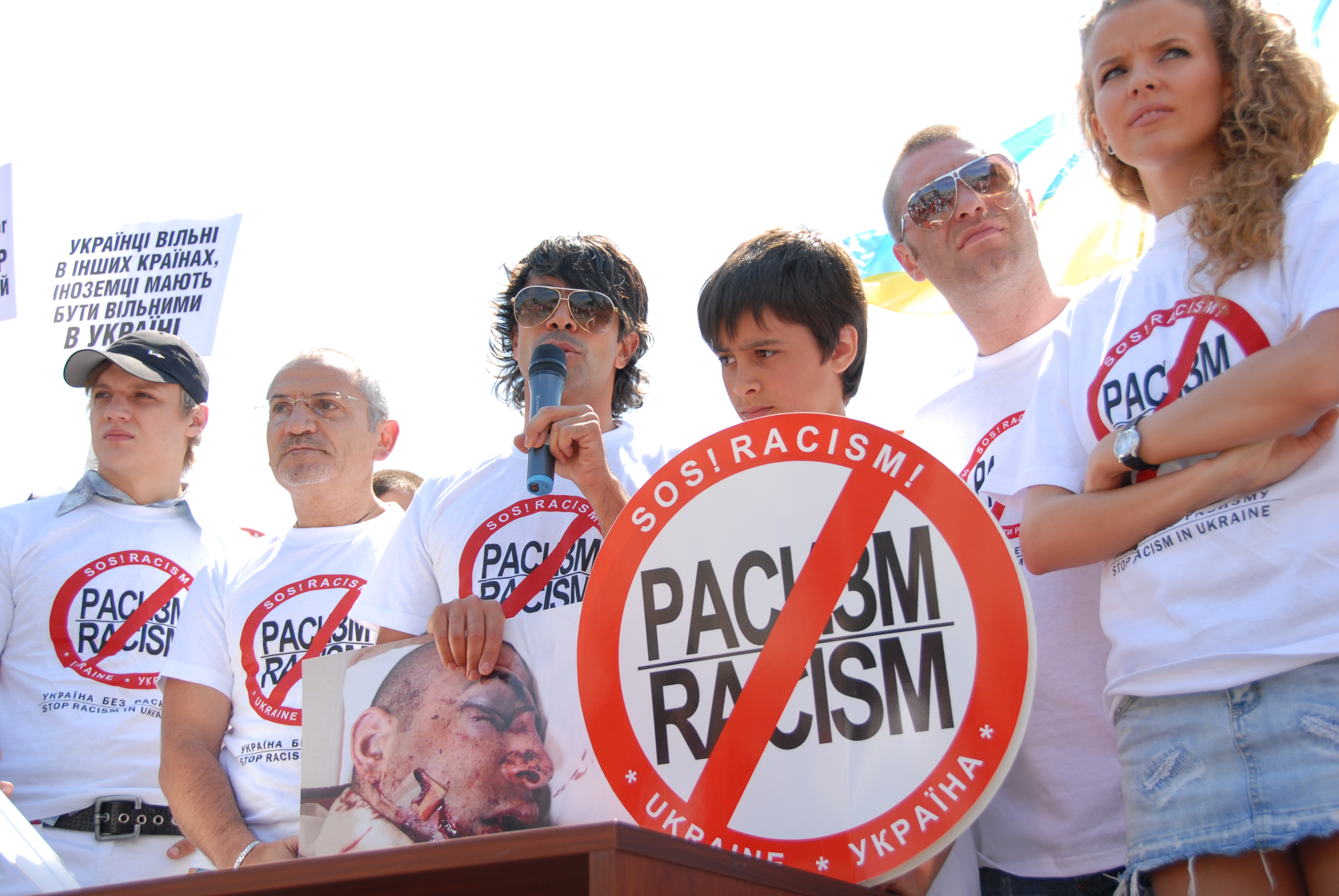
During the protest march SOS! Racism, 2007

In 2007, Walid Harfouch established the public organization "SOS! Racism!" and assumed the position of General Secretary. T"SOS! Racism!" spearheaded numerous public events, including the March Against Racism, which garnered widespread attention and political support. As a result of the march and with the backing of Ukrainian deputy Anna German Verkhovna Rada of Ukraine, a bill was proposed, modeled on the French version, to intensify penalties for instances of racism, antisemitism, and xenophobia.

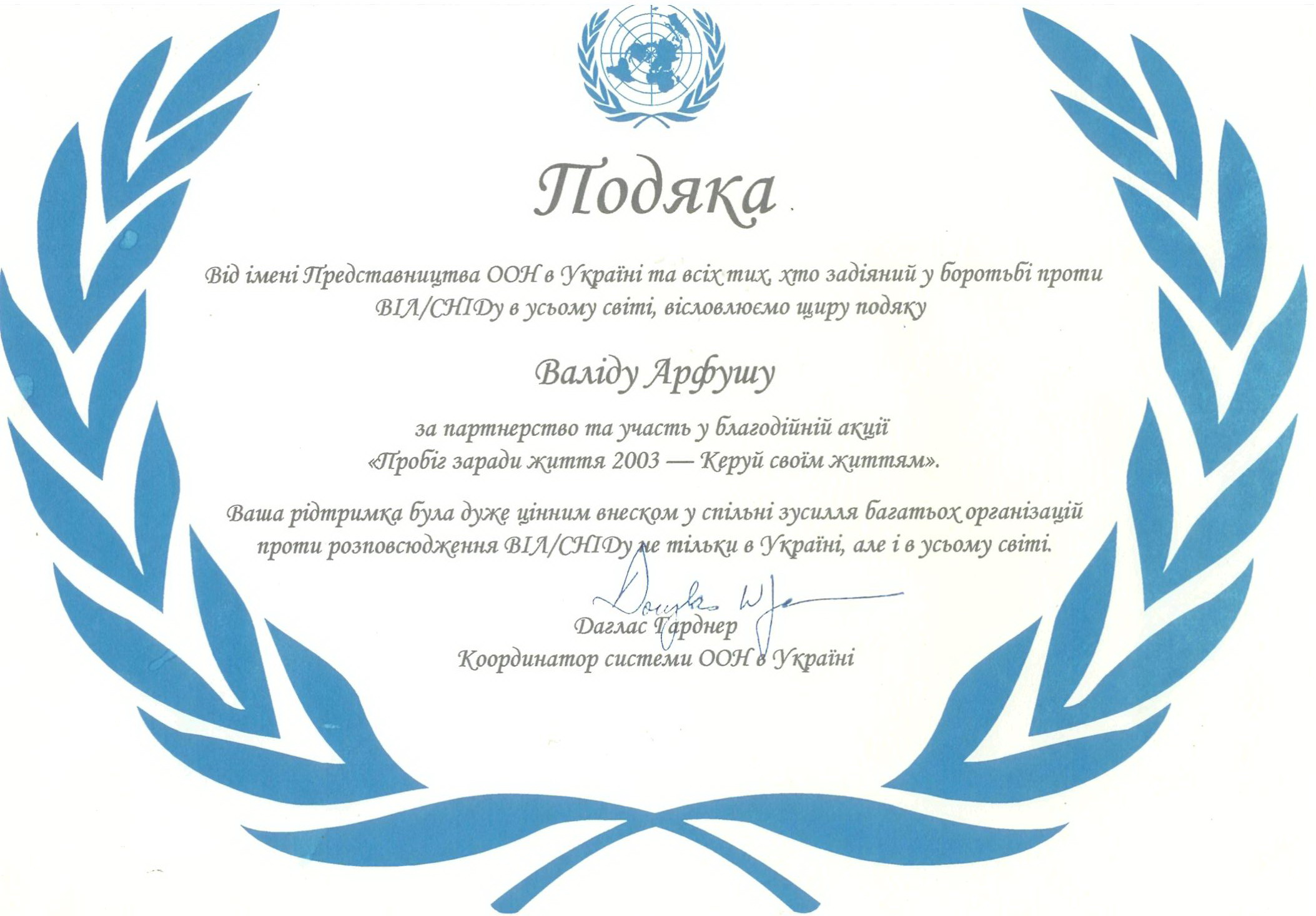
Thanks on behalf of the UN Office in Ukraine, and all those who are involved in the fight against HIV / AIDS worldwide

In response to the 2020 George Floyd protests which were marred by incidents of looting, Harfouch highlighted in an interview that the protests were motivated by issues of racism, emphasizing that the looting overshadowed the noble intentions of the movement.

Harfouch extended his condolences to the relatives of those killed in the Port of Beirut explosion in August 2020. He urged the Ukrainian community to provide moral support to the Lebanese, considering Ukraine's historically positive relations with the Lebanese people and the republic.

== Personal life ==
In the mid-90s, Walid married Natalya Dementieva, with whom he raised a son, Karim (born 1996), and a daughter, Liza (born 2000).

In 2001, Walid entered into a civil union with Lida Petrova, formalizing their marriage in 2015. Together, they have three children: Emilie (born 2004), Adam (born 2012), and Adele-Chloe (born 2016).

In 2008, Walid Harfouch converted to Orthodoxy, while maintaining a philosophical adherence to Buddhism and embracing all religions that promote love.

"The only religion for me is love, since Christianity says love your neighbor, this religion is close to me."

== Hobbies ==
=== Yoga ===
Walid Harfouch is a professional yoga practitioner and believes that yoga should be included in the school curriculum. His trainer is the famous yoga master Oksana Novakovska. Every year on June 21, Walid celebrates International Yoga Day with his friends.

== Interesting Facts ==
- In 2006, at the invitation of the Ukrainian director Andrey Benkendorf, Walid starred in his film "Old Colonels" as the bandit Arthur.
- In 2019, he became a part of the photo exhibition "Spied" by photographer Victoria Smetana.
