= Peter and Sloane =

French musical group

- Origin: France
- Genres: Pop
- Years active: 1984–1987
- Members: Jean-Pierre Savelli; Chantal Richard

Peter and Sloane was a 1980s French musical group. This duet was composed of Jean-Pierre Savelli (Peter) and Chantal Richard (Merry Sloane). Their greatest hit was the song, "Besoin de rien, envie de toi", which was number 1 for nine weeks in 1984 in France.

== Biography ==
Jean-Pierre Savelli sang the opening titles to several French versions of Japanese TV series, such as X-Or (Space Cop Gabin) and Albator, le Corsaire de l'Espace, the French version of the anime classic Captain Harlock. Chantal Richard was formerly Savalli's vocalist. She was also one of the women singers of the musical group of popular festive music La Bande à Basile (Basile's band). She also composed music for the French singers Carlos (La leçon de Square dance) and C.Jérôme (P'tit bonhomme), but also for the musical group of children Mini-Star the big hit of the spring and summer 1984 in France "Danse autour de la Terre" (Dance all over the world). She also provided background vocals with her sister Pascale for French artists like Michel Sardou and even for future huge international star Celine Dion for some of her early songs in French.

Their song "Besoin de rien, envie de toi" was the first to reach number one for sales of single playing records (45 RPM) in France, in the charts hit-parade Top 50, 4 November 1984, the first edition of this first hit parade in France which was broadcast on television, on the new channel Canal Plus. This hit parade, animated by Marc Toesca, was the first in France that was based on the sales of single playing records (45 RPM). It was also the first hit parade in France in which musical video clips could be seen.

In 1987, the duet split after the failure of their third single. Sloane then began a solo career in Quebec, then in France and released the album Exquise. Peter founded a production company and composed several songs for the French singer Indra.

In 1998, the duet released a Best of.

== Discography ==
=== Singles ===
- "Besoin de rien, envie de toi" (1984) - #1 (x9w)
- "Pour tous ceux qui vont s'aimer" (1984)
- "C'est la vie d'château avec toi" (1985) - #43
- "Pour tous ceux qui vont s’aimer" (1985)
- "Imagine que tout recommence" (1991)

=== Albums ===
- Best of (1998)
- Besoin de rien, envie de toi (1999)
