= Nadège Lacroix =

Swiss actress, television personality (born 1986)

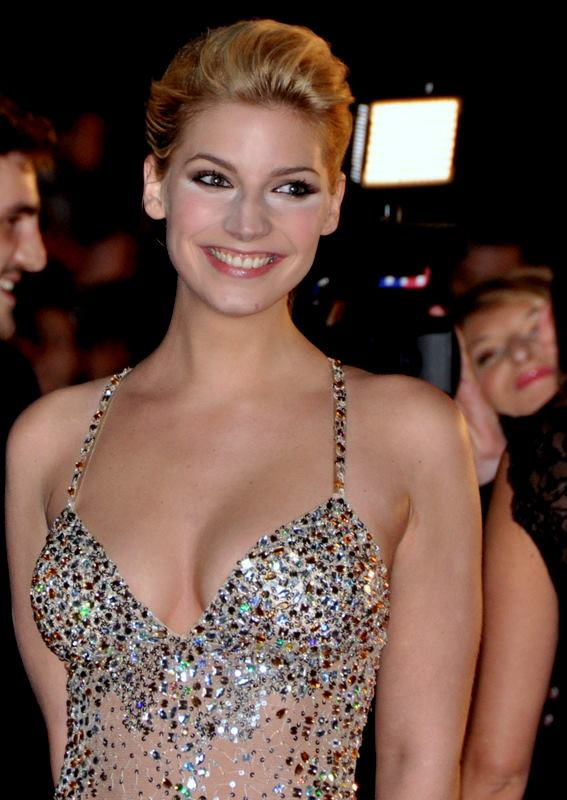
- Nadège Lacroix at the NRJ Music Awards, 2013
- Born: Nadège Lacroix; 30 June 1986 (age 39); Thônex, Switzerland
- Occupations: Actress, television personality
- Years active: 2012–present
- Television: Secret Story; Sous le soleil de Saint-Tropez

Nadège Lacroix (born 30 June 1986) is a Swiss actress, television personality. She became famous thanks to a French reality show, Secret Story. She starred in the Sous le soleil de Saint-Tropez and the scripted television drama series, Hollywood Girls : Une nouvelle vie en Californie.

== Life and career ==
=== 2009-10: Before Secret Story ===
In 2009, she posed nude for the magazine Blick and became the first Swiss French to be included. Nadège appeared, in 2010, on the Swiss program Infrarouge, on RTS Un. The same year, she was elected Miss Fêtes de Genève. She worked for several months as an escort in the same town.

=== 2012 : Secret Story ===
Nadège participated in French TF1 reality show, Secret Story season 6. On 1 June 2012 Nadège entered the House with Thomas Vergara. They share the secret: we are not really siblings. On 7 September 2012 she won season 6 of Secret Story with 73% of votes – a record for a winner of the show – and earned €165,140.

=== 2013-present : TV career and other projects ===
During 2013, Nadège Lacroix officially got her first role, Lisa, in the series Sous le soleil de Saint-Tropez. In February she became a contender on a new reality TV show; Splash : le grand plongeon and was chosen by the public to go to the finals. She participated in the game show Fort Boyard on 10 August 2013. She also becomes a television presenter thanks to programs Télé-réalité : leur nouvelle vie, with Adrien Lemaître, and the French reality show Secret Story (season 7), with Benjamin Castaldi. The same year, she was a TV columnist in After Secret.

Early 2014, Nadège starred in season 2 of Sous le soleil de Saint-Tropez. In December, Lacroix starred a recurrent role in season 8 of Les Mystères de l'amour.

Early 2015, she starred in the scripted television drama series, Hollywood Girls : Une nouvelle vie en Californie. During January - May 2015, she will starred in the play À vos souhaits, with Bernard Menez & Alexandra Kazan.

In 2016, she participated to three consecutive reality TV shows : the second season of Friends Trip, the eighth season of Les Anges and the third season of Les Ch'tis VS Les Marseillais (named Les Marseillais et les Ch'tis VS Le Reste du Monde).

In 2017, she co-hosts the French version of Ridiculousness, Ridiculous Made In France.

In 2022 she participates in the french TV show "les Cinquante" and was eliminated pretty fast.

== Filmography ==
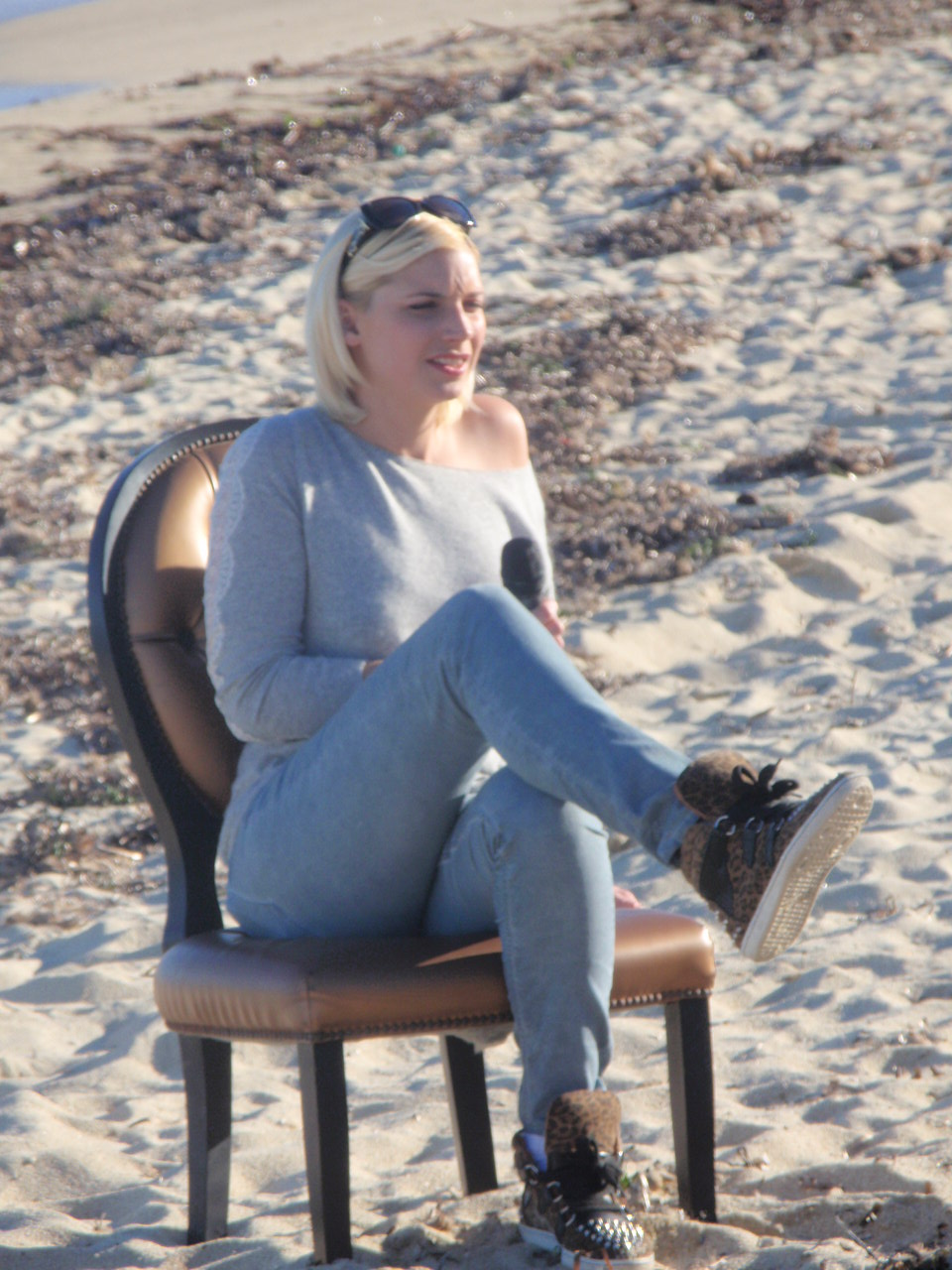
Nadège Lacroix on the filming of "Sous le Soleil de Saint-Tropez".

Television
Year	Film	Role	Notes
2013	Télé-réalité : leur nouvelle vie	TV Host	
2013–2014	Sous le soleil de Saint-Tropez	Lisa Drancourt	Main role (Season 1-2)
2013	Secret Story	co-host	
2013	After Secret	Columnist	
2013	Fort Boyard	Herself	Guest
2014–2015, 2018	Les Mystères de l'amour	Nadège Girard	Recurrent role (Season 8 & 17 )
2015	Hollywood Girls : Une nouvelle vie en Californie	Nadège	Main role (Season 4)
2017	Ridiculous Made In France	co-host	
Reality television
Year	Title	Role	Notes
2012	Secret Story	Herself	Winner
2013	Splash : le grand plongeon	Herself	Finalist
2016	Friends Trip	Herself	
2016	Les Anges 8 : Pacific Dream	Herself	
2016	Les Marseillais et les Ch'tis VS Le Reste du Monde	Herself	
2017–2018	La Villa des coeurs brisés	Herself	
Theater
Year	Title	Role	Notes
2015, 2018	À vos souhaits	Viviane	with Bernard Menez & Alexandra Kazan
2018–2019	La Michto michtonée	Herself	One woman show
2019	Ciel, ma belle-mère !	Valentine	with Gwenola De Luze & David Martin

== Awards and nominations ==
Year	Award	Category	Work	Result
2014	Lauriers TV Awards	Best female or male personality who participated in a program of entertainment	Splash : le grand plongeon	Nominated
