= Secret Story (French TV series) season 6 =

Secret Story
- Season 6
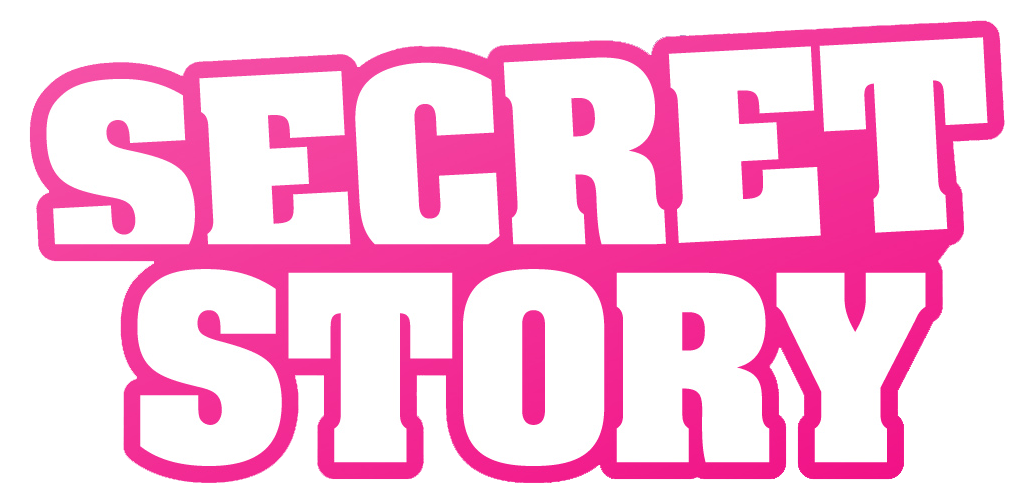
- Presented by: Benjamin Castaldi; Adrien Lemaître (After Secret); Nikos Aliagas (replacement) (Note: During this season, Nikos Aliagas replaced Benjamin Castaldi for certains shows due to a sick leave.)
- No. of days: 106
- No. of housemates: 20
- Winner: Nadège
- Runner-up: Julien
- Companion show: After Secret

Release
- Original network: TF1
- Original release: 25 May – 7 September 2012

Season chronology
- ← Previous; Season 5 Next → Season 7

Secret Story 6 is the sixth season of Secret Story. The show started on May 25, 2012, and concluded on September 7, 2012. The winner is Nadège Lacroix.

== Housemates ==
=== Alexandre ===
He is 20 years old, and is from Lyon, France. He entered the House on Day 1. His secret is "My ex and her other ex is in the house" (with Capucine and Yoann). He was evicted on Day 22.

=== Audrey Mazens (Sanchez) ===
She is 28 years old, originally from Lyon, France, currently living in Miami, United States. She entered the Secret Box on Day 1 and her secret is "I am a housemate of the Secret Box". She shares this secret with Emilie and Midou. She entered in the House on Day 8.

=== Capucine ===
She is 21 years old, and is from Lyon, France. She entered the House on Day 1. Her secret is "Both of my exes are in the House". She shares this secret with Alexandre and Yoann. She was evicted on Day 71.

In 2019 she completed the second season of Je suis une célébrité, sortez-moi de là !.

=== Caroline ===
She's from Longeville-les-Metz in France. Her secret is "I live with my ex-boyfriend and his wife" (with Kévin and Virginie). She entered the House on Day 1 and was evicted on Day 29.

=== David ===
He is 20 years old, and is from Paris, France. He entered the House on Day 1 and was ejected by la Voix on Day 19 for threatening behavior towards Audrey, Caroline, Fanny, and Kévin.

=== Émilie ===
She is 26 years old, and is from Seraing in Belgium. She is a singer and especially a musician. She entered the Secret Box on Day 1 and her secret is "I am a housemate of the Secret Box". She shares this secret with Audrey and Midou. She entered the House on Day 6. She left on Day 57.

=== Fanny ===
She is 28 years old, and is from Paris (Maisons-Alfort) in France. She entered the House on Day 1. Her secret is "I have +100 tattoos on my body". She was evicted on Day 85.

=== Ginie ===
She is 20 years old, and is from Brussels, municipality of Kortenberg in Belgium. She was evicted on Day 43.

=== Isabella ===
She is 18 years old, and is from Paris, France. She entered the House on Day 1. She was evicted on Day 8.

=== Julien ===
He is 21 years old, and is from Paris (Combs-la-Ville) in France. He entered the House on Day 1.

=== Kévin ===
He is 33 years old, and comes from Longeville-les-Metz in France. He entered the House on Day 1. His secret is "I live with my wife and my ex-girlfriend" (with Virginie and Caroline). He was evicted on Day 65.

=== Marie ===
She is 25 years old and is from Paris, France. She entered the House on Day 1. Her secret is "I am a chess grandmaster". She left the House on Day 4.

=== Matthieu ===
He is 27 years old and is from Châteauguay in Canada, a suburb of Montreal, in southwestern Quebec. He entered the House on Day 1. Matthieu revealed to the viewers and to the host his secret in the Diary Room on Day 1. His secret is "I survived a plane crash". He left the House on Day 14.

=== Midou ===
He is 26 years old and is from Paris (Champs-sur-Marne) in France. He entered the Secret Box on Day 1. His secret is "I am a housemate of the Secret Box". He shares this secret with Audrey and Emilie. He entered the House on Day 8 and was eliminated on Day 36.

=== Nadège ===
She is 25 years old and is from Thônex in Switzerland, a municipality of Genève. She entered the House on Day 8. Her secret is "We are not really siblings" (with Thomas). She is the winner of Secret Story 6.

=== Sacha ===
He is 18 years old and is from Beaucouze in France. He entered the House on Day 1. His secret is "I received my bac at age 14". He was evicted on Day 99.

=== Sergueï ===
He is 25 years old, and is from Nice, France. His secret is "I was switched at birth". He was evicted on Day 15.

=== Thomas ===
He is 24 years old and is from Aix en Provence in France. He entered the House on Day 8. His secret is "We are not really siblings" (with Nadège). He was ejected on Day 93 for physical violence against Nadège.

=== Virginie ===
She is 27 years old and is from Longeville-les-Metz in France. She entered the house on Day 1. Her secret is "I live with my husband and his ex-girlfriend" (with Caroline and Kévin). She was evicted on Day 92.

=== Yoann ===
He is 21 years old, and is from Lyon, France. He entered the House on Day 1 and his secret is "My ex and her other ex is in the house" (with Alexandre and Capucine).

== Secrets ==
Name	Age	Country	Secret	Discovered by	Stats
Nadège Lacroix	26	Switzerland	We are not really siblings. (with Thomas)	Audrey	Winner
Julien Sznejderman	21	France	I am the access code to the secret of the house.	Virginie	Runner-up
Yoann Fontaine	21	France	My ex is in the house. (with Capucine)	Julien	Finalist
Audrey Mazens Sanchez	28	United States	I am a housemate of the Secret Box. (with Émilie and Midou)	Virginie	Finalist
Sacha Minéo	18	France	I earned my Baccalauréat at 14 years old.	Nadège	Evicted
Thomas Vergara	25	France	We are not really siblings. (with Nadège)	Audrey	Ejected
Virginie Cueillette	27	France	I live with my husband and his ex. (with Caroline and Kévin)	Thomas	Evicted
Fanny Maurer	28	France	I have more than 100 tattoos.	Caroline	Evicted
Capucine Anav	21	France	Both of my exes are in the house. (with Alexandre and Yoann)	Audrey	Evicted
Kévin Emmenecker	33	France	I live with my wife and my ex. (with Caroline and Virginie)	Thomas	Evicted
Émilie Sabbia	26	Belgium	I am a housemate of the Secret Box. (with Audrey and Midou)	-	Evicted
Virginie "Ginie" Philippot	20	Belgium	I was born with 12 fingers.	-	Evicted
Mohamed "Midou" Boukhatem	26	France	I am a housemate of the Secret Box. (with Audrey and Émilie)	Nadège	Evicted
Caroline Scuto	25	France	I live with my ex and his wife. (with Kévin and Virginie)	Thomas	Evicted
Alexandre Gérard	20	France	My ex is in the house. (with Capucine)	Julien	Evicted
David Schemba	20	France	My face has been completely rebuilt.	-	Ejected
Sergueï Chidyvar	25	France	I have been switched at birth.	-	Evicted
Mathieu Bourdet	27	Canada	I survived a plane crash.	-	Walked
Isabella Di Fabio	18	France	I am a descendant of samurais.	-	Evicted
Marie Sebag	25	France	I am a chess grandmaster.	-	Walked

== Nominations table ==
	Week 1	Week 2	Week 3	Week 4	Week 5	Week 6	Week 7	Week 8	Week 9	Week 10	Week 11	Week 12	Week 13	Week 14	Week 15 Final	
Nadège	Not in House	Sergueï; Alexandre	~~Kévin~~; Alexandre	Not; Eligible	Immune; House	Exempt	~~Thomas~~; ~~Yoann~~	Not; Eligible	Not; Eligible	Not; Eligible	Nominated	Fanny	Not; Eligible	No; Nominations	Winner (Day 106)	
Julien	Isabella; Capucine	Not; Eligible	Not; Eligible	Capucine; Ginie	Immune; House	Audrey; Ginie	Not; Eligible	Émilie; Nadège	Nominated	Capucine; Nadège	Audrey; Nadège; Thomas; Yoann	Nominated	Nominated	Exempt	Runner-Up (Day 106)	
Yoann	Caroline; Ginie	Not; Eligible	Exempt	Virginie; Ginie	Immune; House	Ginie; Audrey	Not; Eligible	Émilie; Nadège	Not Eligible saved	Capucine; Nadège	Nominated	Not; Eligible	Thomas; Audrey	No; Nominations	Third Place (Day 106)	
Audrey	Secret; Box	Alexandre; Sergueï	~~Kévin~~; Alexandre	Exempt	Nomination; House	Nominated	~~Thomas~~; ~~Yoann~~	Not; Eligible	Yoann; Virginie	Nominated	Nominated	Not; Eligible	Nominated	No; Nominations	Fourth Place (Day 106)	
Sacha	Isabella; Capucine	Not; Eligible	Not; Eligible	Capucine; Ginie	Nominated	Not; Eligible	Not; Eligible	Émilie; Nadège	Nominated	Capucine; Nadège	Not; Eligible	Not; Eligible	Julien; Virginie	No; Nominations	Evicted (Day 99)	
Thomas	Not in House	Not; Eligible	Nominated	Caroline; Virginie; Ginie	Nominated	Not; Eligible	Not; Eligible	Fanny; Audrey	Not; Eligible	Fanny; Virginie	Nominated	Julien	Nominated	Ejected (Day 93)		
Virginie	Not; Eligible	Thomas; Sergueï	Thomas; Alexandre	Not; Eligible	Nomination; House	Little; Room	~~Kévin~~; ~~Julien~~	Secret; Room	Not Eligible saved	Capucine; Nadège	Not; Eligible	Not; Eligible	Nominated	Evicted (Day 92)		
Fanny	Not; Eligible	Thomas; Sergueï	Thomas; Alexandre	Not; Eligible	Nomination; House	Little; Room	~~Kévin~~; ~~Julien~~	Not; Eligible	Not; Eligible	Not; Eligible	Not; Eligible	Nominated	Evicted (Day 85)			
Capucine	Not; Eligible	Not; Eligible	~~Kévin~~; Midou	Not; Eligible	Nomination; House	Not; Eligible	~~Thomas~~; ~~Yoann~~	Not; Eligible	Not; Eligible	Not; Eligible	Evicted (Day 71)					
Kévin	Isabella; Capucine	Not; Eligible	Not Eligible saved	Capucine; Ginie	Immune; House	Not; Eligible	Not; Eligible	Émilie; Nadège	Nominated	Evicted (Day 65)						
Émilie	Secret; Box	Sacha; Mathieu	~~Kévin~~; Alexandre	Not; Eligible	Nomination; House	Not; Eligible	~~Thomas~~; ~~Yoann~~	Not; Eligible	Evicted (Day 57)							
Ginie	Not; Eligible	Sergueï; Alexandre	Midou; Julien	Not; Eligible	Nomination; House	Nominated	Evicted (Day 43)									
Midou	Secret; Box	Not; Eligible	Not; Eligible	Virginie; Ginie	Nominated	Evicted (Day 36)										
Caroline	Not; Eligible	Thomas; Sergueï	Thomas; Alexandre	Nominated	Evicted (Day 29)											
Alexandre	Caroline; Ginie	Not; Eligible	Not; Eligible	Evicted (Day 22)												
David	Caroline; Fanny	Not; Eligible	Not; Eligible	Ejected (Day 19)												
Sergueï	Isabella; Capucine	Not; Eligible	Evicted (Day 15)													
Mathieu	Isabella; Capucine	Not; Eligible	Walked (Day 14)													
Isabella	Not; Eligible	Evicted (Day 8)														
Marie	Walked (Day 4)															
Up for eviction	Capucine; Isabella	Alexandre; Nadège; Sergueï; Thomas	Alexandre; Capucine; Nadège; Thomas	Capucine; Caroline; Ginie	Midou; Sacha; Thomas	Audrey; Ginie	Virginie	Émilie; Nadège	Julien; Kévin; Sacha	Audrey; Capucine; Nadège	Audrey; Nadège; Thomas; Yoann	Fanny; Julien	Audrey; Julien; Thomas; Virginie	Audrey; Nadège; Sacha; Yoann	All; Housemates	
Nominations Notes	1	2, 3, 4	5, 6, 7	8, 9, 10	11	12, 13	14	15	16	17, 18	19	20	21	22	none	
Walked	Marie	Mathieu	none													
Ejected	none		David	none									Thomas	none		
Evicted	Isabella; 19% to save	Sergueï; 18% to save	Alexandre; 21% to save	Caroline; 8% to save	Midou; 17% to save	Ginie; 34% to save	Virginie; 50.31% to save	Émilie; 15% to save	Kévin; 18.4% to save	Capucine; 16% to save	Nadège; Thomas; 90% fake evict	Fanny; 48% to save	Virginie; 9% to save	Sacha; 9% to save	Audrey; 6% to win	Yoann; 7% to win
Evicted	Isabella; 19% to save	Sergueï; 18% to save	Alexandre; 21% to save	Caroline; 8% to save	Midou; 17% to save	Ginie; 34% to save	Virginie; 50.31% to save	Émilie; 15% to save	Kévin; 18.4% to save	Capucine; 16% to save	Nadège; Thomas; 90% fake evict	Fanny; 48% to save	Virginie; 9% to save	Sacha; 9% to save	Julien; 14% to win	Nadège; 73% to win

- ^Note 1: Female nominations. Only male housemates could nominate.
- ^Note 2: Male nominations. Only female housemates could nominate.
- ^Note 3: Male nominations. Only female housemates could nominate. Friday, during the live show, the housemates accepted to protect Kevin's secret and ban one female housemate to nominate. Midou and Thomas decided to ban Capucine from nominating.
- ^Note 4: In weeks 2, 3, and 4, both Nadège and Thomas will face the public vote if one of them is nominated.
- ^Note 5: Yoann won immunity because of the Trust Show.
- ^Note 6: Capucine is automatically nominated because of the Trust Show.
- ^Note 7: Caroline and Fanny won the joker card and they decided to automatically nominate Thomas and save Kévin from the nominations.
- ^Note 8: Audrey won immunity because she opened a secret book containing immunity.
- ^Note 9: As the master of the game this week, Thomas made a wish on Day 25 to automatically nominate Caroline.
- ^Note 10: Julien has a double vote for the nominations this week. He nominated Capucine twice.
- ^Note 11: This week, housemates are separated in 2 Houses: the Immune House and the Nomination House. After confrontations in the room of duels, the boys of The Nomination House are nominated: Midou, Sacha, and Thomas.
- ^Note 12: As they stayed in the Immune House, Fanny, Nadège, and Virgine are immune for the sixth round of nominations.
- ^Note 13: La Voix decided to give an important power to Julien. He is the master of nominations. Yoann will have the possibility to help him.
- ^Note 14: Virginie obtained the card of the nominations inverted, the girls vote as the result for both boys whom they wish to protect. But Virginie didn't have to reveal the existence of the card. But because she didn't, all nominations were voided and Virginie faced the public vote alone. The public voted to either evict or save her.
- ^Note 15: La Voix gave a mission to Kévin: he had to make believe the housemates that he wanted to leave the House. In reality, he joined Virginie in the Secret Room.
- ^Note 16: The red phone announces to Kévin and Virginie where they are automatically nominated. In the red room, Sacha is automatically nominated. Kévin and Sacha nominated Julien and Yoann to face the public with them. Audrey becomes master of the immunity and saves Virginie and Yoann. The three nominated are Julien, Kévin, and Sacha.
- ^Note 17: By answering the red phone, Audrey is automatically nominated.
- ^Note 18: Virginie is exceptionally able to nominate during the tenth round of nominations with the boys because of Kévin's eviction.
- ^Note 19: Thanks to his secret, Julien nominates 4 housemates. In reality, the public choose his preferred duet to join the Secret Room.
- ^Note 20: Nadège and Thomas, in Secret Room, becomes the masters of the nomination this week. They made their choice live on the prime show on Day 85. Nadège nominates Fanny and Thomas nominates Julien.
- ^Note 21: Sacha and Yoann becomes the masters of nomination. They have to each nominate two persons of their clan. They can nominate themselves.
- ^Note 22: Julien is immune from eviction and is automatically a finalist.

== Nominations: Results ==
Weeks	Nominated	Evicted
Week 1	Capucine (81%), Isabella (19%)	Marie (Walked), Isabella
Week 1	Audrey & Midou (81% - saved)	none
Week 2	Alexandre (36%), Thomas (27%), Nadège (19%), Sergueï (18%)	Mathieu (Walked), Sergueï
Week 3	Thomas (32%), Nadège (24%), Capucine (23%), Alexandre (21%)	David (Ejected), Alexandre
Week 4	Capucine (50%), Caroline (8%), Ginie (42%)	Caroline
Week 5	Thomas (61%), Sacha (22%), Midou (17%)	Midou
Week 6	Audrey (66%), Ginie (34%)	Ginie
Week 7	Virginie (50.31% - saved)	none
Week 8	Nadège (85%), Émilie (15%)	Émilie
Week 9	Julien (48%), Sacha (33.6%), Kévin (18.4%)	Kévin
Week 10	Nadège (54%), Audrey (30%), Capucine (16%)	Capucine
Week 11	Nadège/Thomas (90%), Nadège/Yoann (5%), Audrey/Yoann (3%), Audrey/Thomas (2%)	none
Week 12	Julien (52%), Fanny (48%)	Fanny
Week 13	Thomas (40%), Audrey (36%), Julien (15%), Virginie (9%)	Virginie, Thomas (Ejected)
Week 14	Nadège (55%), Audrey (18%), Yoann (18%), Sacha (9%)	Sacha
Final - Week 15	Nadège (73%), Julien (14%), Yoann (7%), Audrey (6%)	Audrey, Yoann, Julien

== Live Show Ratings ==
The launch is @ 8.50p.m., the Live Shows are @ 10.30/10.50p.m. to 00.15a.m.

Show N°	Day	Viewers	Ratings Share
1 - Launch	Friday, May 25	4 096 000	19,4%
2	Friday, June 1	2,479,000	25.1%
3	Friday, June 8	1,895,000	20%
4	Friday, June 15	2,200,000	23%
5	Friday, June 22	1,830,000	20%
6	Friday, June 29	1,991,000	18.9%
7	Friday, July 6	2,350,000	20.2%
8	Friday, July 13	1,900,000	18%
9	Friday, July 20	2,200,000	19%
10	Saturday, July 28	1,640,000	14.5%
11	Friday, August 3	2,300,000	17.4%
12	Friday, August 10	1,700,000	13%
13	Friday, August 17	2,000,000	25%
14	Friday, August 24	2,100,000	25.6%
15	Friday, August 31	2,166,000	27%
16	Friday, September 7	2,130,000	31%

== The After Secret Ratings ==
Show N°	Day	Viewers	Ratings Share
1	Friday, June 1	1,200,000	27.9%
2	Friday, June 8	1,000,000	25%
3	Friday, June 15	1,100,000	24.8%
4	Friday, June 22	1,300,000	27%
5	Friday, June 29	1,180,000	26.5%
6	Friday, July 6	1,500,000	28%
7	Friday, July 13	1,500,000	28,2%
8	Friday, July 20	1,480,000	27.6%
9	Saturday, July 28	1,200,000	19.4%
10	Friday, August 3	1,760,000	29%
11	Friday, August 10		
12	Friday, August 17		
13	Friday, August 24		
14	Friday, August 31		
15	Friday, September 7		

== Night Live Feed ==
Show N°	Day	Viewers	Ratings Share
1	Friday, May 25		
