= Gérard Vivès =

French actor, comedian and television presenter

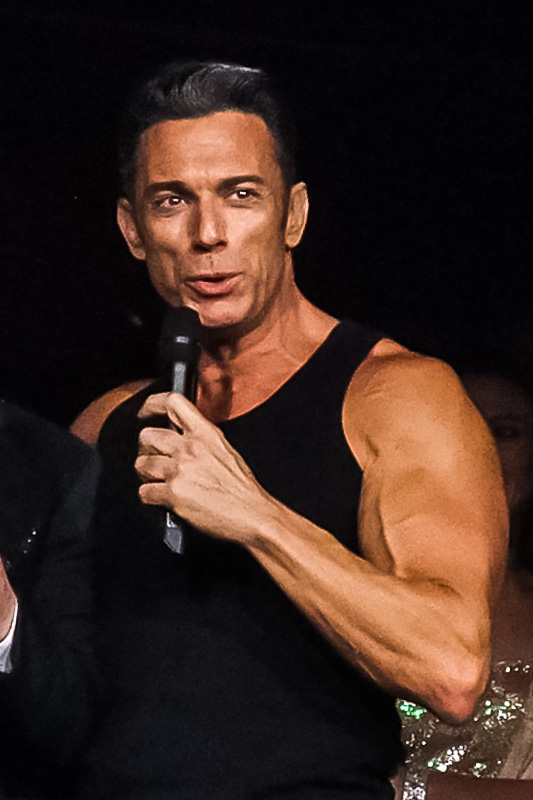
- Gérard during Danse avec les stars tour in Paris on 31 January 2015
- Born: 30 November 1962 (age 63); Choisy-le-Roi, Val-de-Marne, France
- Occupations: Actor, television presenter
- Years active: 1987–present
- Television: Les Filles d'à côté Les Nouvelles Filles d'à côté Le Juste Prix; Danse avec les stars Splash : le grand plongeon

Gérard Vivès (born 30 November 1962) is a French actor, comedian and television presenter. He is better known for playing in the series Les Filles d'à côté from 1993 to 1996, and co-hosting the game show Le Juste Prix from 2009 to 2011, hosted by Vincent Lagaf'.

== Biography and career ==
=== Early career (1987–93) ===
Gérard Vivès was born on 30 November 1962 in Choisy-le-Roi in the department of Val-de-Marne. He began his acting career in the film Aria (1987), portraying a small role of a bodybuilder. In 1992, he briefly appeared in the program Les Nuls L'émission. The same year, he played a small role in the film Les Visiteurs, where he escorts Godefroy le Hardi (played by Jean Reno) when he comes out of the psychiatrist hospital. However, he was uncredited in the film cast.

=== Les Filles d'à côté (1993–96) ===
After playing a few guest roles in a number of AB Productions series including Le Miel et les abeilles, Hélène et les garçons and Le Collège des cœurs brisés, Gérard Vivès became well known from the audience in the series Les Filles d'à côté, in which he portrays Gérard, an effeminate gym club owner who is a gay stereotype.

The series broadcast on TF1 since 1993, was a success until 1995, period where the actors were progressively replaced one after the other. The series was then renamed Les Nouvelles Filles d'à côté. Playing the character of Gérard, he contributes a lot at the success of the sitcom. In two episodes of the new series, he also portrays Berny, the twin brother of Gérard. The same character of Gérard also appeared in other sitcoms such as Permiers baisers (1994) and La Croisière foll'amour (1996).

=== Television presenting ===
After his role in Les Filles d'à côté, Gérard Vivès became a television presenter. He regularly participated at the game show Drôle de jeu on TF1, presented by Vincent Lagaf' and produced by Hervé Hubert.

He co-hosted on France 3 the program Je passe à la télé from 1997 to 1998, and the game show Le Kouij also produced by Hervé Hubert from 1998 to 1999, with the virtual character Clic. In January 1998, he participated at the game show Fort Boyard in a special episode for the new year.

=== Le Juste Prix ===
In July 2009, he joined the game show Le Juste Prix on TF1, hosted by Vincent Lagaf'. He is the person charged of announcing the candidates, presenting the products and giving the prices. He is on the set behind a desk and often comes down to play small sketches, in which he appears disguised or presents crazy fake gifts.

In October 2010, he had an accident during the filming of Le Juste Prix in the studio. He wore a helmet and was only lightly injured. In November, Vincent Lagaf' stated that he had sixteen stitches on the head, two broken ribs and a twisted ankle. He was absent in the following broadcasts and was not replaced. Since then, Vincent Lagaf' hosted alone the game show, while the "Gafettes" replaced him to present the games to win a product, a kitty or a trip. Gérard Vivès came back in the program on 17 December 2010.

In June 2012, he announced that he would not come back to co-host Le Juste Prix in September. He is replaced by a voiceover and the Gafettes permanently replaced him to present the games for a gift.

=== Splash : le grand plongeon ===
In February 2013, he co-hosted the program Splash : le grand plongeon (French version of Splash!) on TF1 with Estelle Denis and Julie Taton.

== Filmography ==
Year	Title	Role	Director	Notes
1987	Aria	Bodybuilder	Jean-Luc Godard	Segment "Armide"
1993	Helen and the Guys	Thomas Fava's bodyguard	Gérard Espinasse; Jean-Pierre Spiero	TV series (3 episodes)
1993	The Visitors	Male nurse	Jean-Marie Poiré	
1994	Premiers baisers	Gérard		TV series (Episode : "Le cadeau de mariage")
1993-95	Les filles d'à côté	Gérard		TV series (126 episodes)
1995-96	Les nouvelles filles d'à côté	Gérard / Berny		TV series (113 episodes)
1996	La croisière Foll'amour	Gérard		TV series (2 episodes)
1998	Extra Zigda	Monsieur Blanchard	Philippe Layani	TV series
2001	Gamer	Marcus Lambert	Patrick Levy	
2001	Caméra Café	John-Kevin		TV series (1 episode : "Cheap and que dalle")
2003	Un amour en kit	Brando	Philippe de Broca	TV movie
2005	Cheyenne	Hugues / Waka Tanka	Hervé Prat	Short

== See also ==
- Le Juste Prix
- Danse avec les stars
- Danse avec les stars (France season 3)
