= 2Be3 =

French boy band

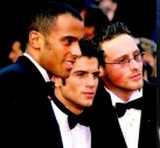
- Left to right: Adel Kachermi, Filip Nikolic, Frank Delay

Background information
- Origin: France
- Genres: Dance-pop; Europop; pop; Eurodance; dance
- Years active: 1996–2001
- Past members: Frank Delay; Adel Kachermi; Filip Nikolic

2Be3 was a French boy band that was active from 1996 to 2001.

== History ==
2Be3 was formed in 1996 and comprised three childhood friends from Longjumeau (a suburb of Paris): Filip Nikolic, Adel Kachermi and Frank Delay. Inspired by English bands like Take That and Worlds Apart, the group produced 3 studio albums and various compilations before disbanding in 2001.

The name 2Be3 was a pun on the English language phrases to be free (in French, "être libre") and to be three ("être trois"). Hence the band's name was pronounced in English ("Two Be Three") rather than French ("Deux Be Trois").

Hugely popular in France, despite attempts to break the American and British markets (via an English-language single, Excuse My French, produced in Miami by Desmond Child), their only significant chart success occurred in their home nation. In 1997 they appeared in their own television series (called Pour être libre) which ran for 40 episodes on TF1, and several videos were released including a live concert from the Bercy arena in Paris. Their song "Toujours là pour toi" is a French cover of "Never Gonna Give You Up", originally sung by Rick Astley.

During year 2000, they went on a promotional tour in France, Germany, England, Switzerland, Belgium and Yugoslavia. In 2001, they left for Asia for a tour of several months and brought out the album Excuse My French, which was a big success there.

== Post-breakup ==
After disbanding, Filip Nikolic had a role in the film Simon Sez with Dennis Rodman and appeared in the French version of I'm a Celebrity... Get Me Out of Here! in 2006. Nikolic later had a television career as a comedian. From 2002 to 2007 he had a recurring role as Yann Boldec in the French series Navarro and, from 2007 to 2009, in the spin-off series Brigade Navarro. Filip was reportedly preparing a solo album when he died of a heart attack on 16 September 2009. He was 35 years old.

== Discography ==
=== Albums ===
Year	Album	Charts		Certifications
Year	Album	FRA	BEL	Certifications
1997	Partir un jour	2	3	BEA: Platinum; SNEP: 3× Platinum
1997	Remix Collector	14	—	
1998	2 Be 3	4	6	BEA: Gold; SNEP: 2× Gold
1999	Bercy 98	38	—	
2001	L'Essential	—	—	
2001	Excuse My French	—	—	
"—" denotes releases that did not chart

=== Singles ===
Year	Single	Charts		Certifications
Year	Single	FRA	BEL	Certifications
1996	"Partir un jour"	2	4	BEA: Gold; SNEP: Gold
1997	"Toujours là pour toi"	4	12	SNEP: Gold
1997	"Donne"	8	19	
1997	"La salsa"	7	11	SNEP: Gold
1997	"2 Be 3 (Pour être libre)"	15	17	SNEP: Gold
1998	"Don't Say Goodbye"	14	22	SNEP: Gold
1998	"Regarde-moi"	27	—	
2000	"Excuse My French"	71	—	
2000	"Even If"	—	—	
"—" denotes releases that did not chart

=== Videos ===
Year	Video	Certifications
1997	En Coulisses – Vol. 1	SNEP: Diamond
1997	En Coulisses – Vol. 2	SNEP: 3× Platinum
1998	Live au Zénith	SNEP: 3× Platinum
