= Filip Nikolic =

French actor and singer (1974–2009)

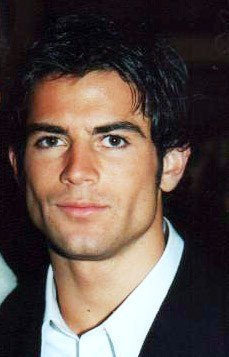
- Born: 1 September 1974; Saint-Ouen-sur-Seine, Île-de-France, France
- Died: 16 September 2009 (aged 35); Paris, France
- Occupations: Singer, songwriter, actor
- Years active: 1988–2009

Filip Nikolic (Serbian: Филип Николић, Filip Nikolić; 1 September 1974 – 16 September 2009) was a French-Serbian actor and singer, best known as the lead of the French band 2Be3.

Born at Saint-Ouen, Seine-Saint-Denis, he was raised with two siblings in Longjumeau, a suburb of Paris.

Filip was a French singer, but he also featured in acting roles in a TV shows such as Navarro and Pour être libre, a series centred on 2Be3. He also appeared in the US movie Simon Sez with Dennis Rodman in 1999. He was also runner-up in the French version of I'm a Celebrity...Get Me Out of Here! in 2006.

== Death ==
He died on 16 September 2009, aged 35, reportedly while preparing a solo album. According to the first reports the cause of the death was a heart attack due to a combination of pills he used to get to sleep.
