= Indra (singer) =

Sweden-Estonian vocalist

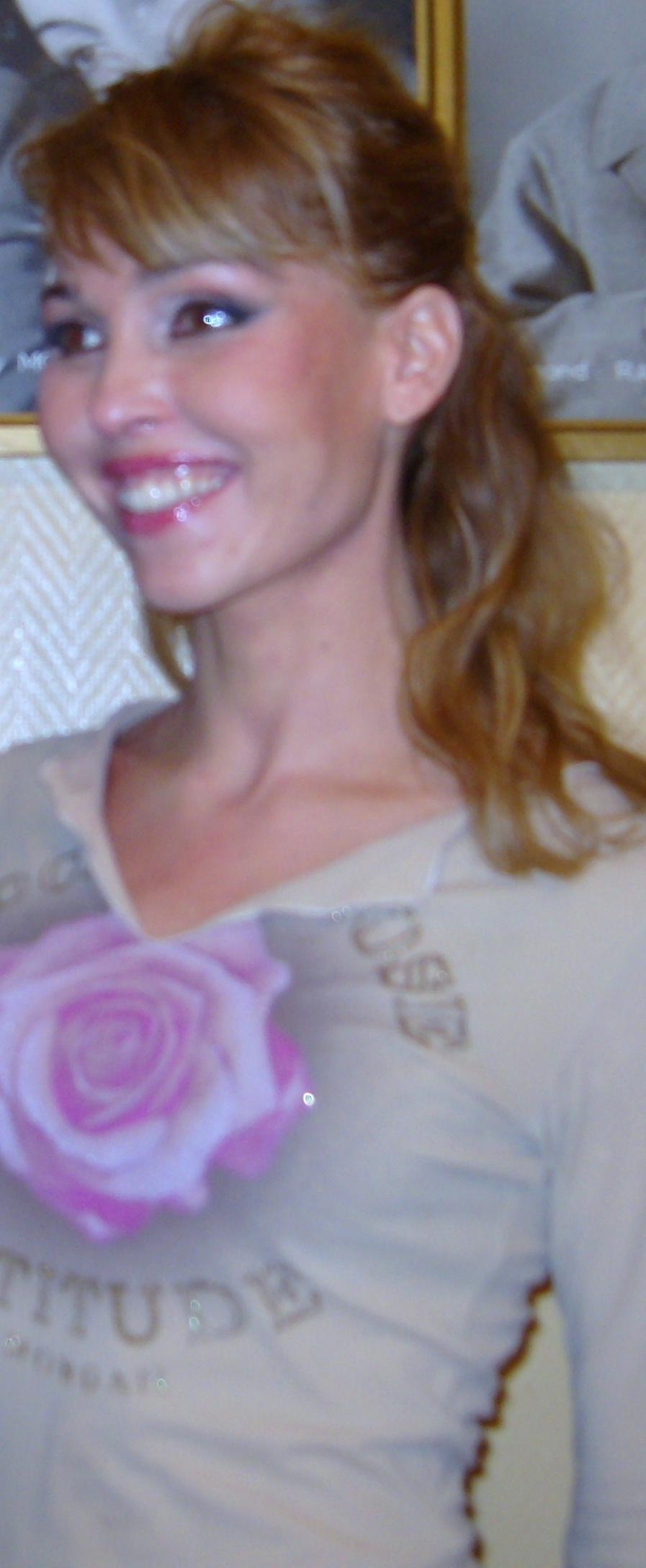
- Indra in January 2009, after one of her performances in "Ma femme est folle".

Background information
- Born: Indra Kuldasaar; 20 July 1967 (age 58); Sweden
- Genres: Eurodance, pop
- Occupation: Singer
- Years active: 1990-2013
- Labels: Orlando/Carrere (1990-1994); Orlando/East West (1995-1999); BG Productions/Warner Music (2004-2006); BG Productions/Mercury (2009)
- Website: http://www.indraofficiel.com

Indra Kuldasaar (born 20 July 1967 in Gothenburg, Sweden) is a dance music singer, who achieved success in France.

== Background ==
Indra was born in Göteborg, Sweden to Estonian parents. Following her model boyfriend to Paris in the late 1980s, she was discovered dancing in a Parisian night club, and was soon offered a recording contract.

== Musical career ==
=== 1990s ===
She worked with the producer Orlando, brother of French singer Dalida, and released her début single "Let's Go Crazy" in late 1990. Much like the club/house music style of the time, the song also contained elements of rap, and crossed over from the underground to the mainstream, reaching No. 11 on the French singles chart.

In 1991, Indra's second single "Misery" hit No. 7 in France. It was written and produced by Eddy Beatboxking a.k.a. Walter Taieb, with lyrics by American songwriter Cathy Grier. The song remains Indra's biggest hit to date.

This was followed by another top 10 track, "Temptation" written and produced by Walter Taieb, and her debut album also titled Temptation later in the year. The album went gold in France and was later released in some other territories, though Indra never managed to gain success outside of France. The album's fourth and last single was released in early 1992, "Tell Me", which was a top 20 hit.

In autumn 1992, Indra released "Gimme What's Real", the first single from her second album. The single peaked at No. 16 on the French singles chart, becoming Indra's fifth consecutive top 20 hit.

At that time, Indra was very popular in France and managed to establish herself as the 'Queen of Dance Music' with a big club impact in addition to her chart success. She was the opening act for Prince's concert in Paris in July 1992.

Indra's second album, Together Tonight, was released in January 1993 and also went gold in France. After a string of dance singles, Indra released the ballad "Rescue Me" as her sixth single, which reached No. 38 in France. A third single from the album was released later in 1993, "Yesterday Is History (Tomorrow Is a Mystery)" but it did not manage to chart in the top 50.

After only two albums, 1994 saw the release of a Best Of collection, which yielded two brand new singles, "Hollywood" and "Save My Life". Both failed to make the French top 50, but the album again reached gold status.

DJ Bobo and Masterboy produced her third studio album Anywhere, which was released in July 1995. The album was also released in Germany where DJ Bobo is popular. Both the album and its two singles, "Anywhere" and "We Belong Together" did not gain significant success.

In 1995, Indra also participated on the Dalida remix album Comme si j'étais là. She did a rap on the track "Jusqu'au bout du rêve..." which is a remake of the classic Dalida disco hit "Laissez-moi danser (Monday, Tuesday)". The song was planned to be released as a single and a video was made of archive footages of Dalida mixed with images of Indra's "Gimme What's Real" video but the song remained only available on promo CD and 12".

After a break of two years, Indra returned in 1997 with the single "Message for You".

After some TV hosting work in France on the channel France 3 on the show Ce soir, je passe à la télé in 1998; Indra returned to the music industry in 1999 with her fourth studio album, "You & Me".

The lead single Never never spent only one week (#99) in the French single Top 100! The album was a complete failure in terms of sales and no other single was released from that album. However, another single in summer 1999 saw her teamed up with Michael Damian from The Young and the Restless, but the song, Reggae Life, became a further addition to her string of flops totally missing the Top 100.

Indra's recording contract was over at the end of 1999.

=== 2000s ===
Indra married model Guy Paillard, moved to Switzerland, and had a son, Ollie, in 2000.

Indra returned to music in 2004. Still produced by Orlando, she started to sing in French in order to get more radio airplays on the French territory. Her come-back single was the pop/rock song Besoin De Vous, a duet with Frédéric Lerner. The track made the French top 50 (#47), and for the first time saw Indra enter the official Swiss singles chart.

Then, in 2005, she released her 'real' solo come-back single with Oublie-Moi, a pop/R'n'B track penned by Tragédie who had a string of Top 10 hits in France. With that song, Indra found herself back in the French Top 40 (the song peaked at #39).

In 2006, Indra appeared in the French version of reality show I'm a Celebrity... Get Me Out of Here! - Je suis une célébrité, sortez-moi de là!. While still in the show, a new single was released in April 2006 called Sois beau et tais-toi which reached number 16 in France and made Indra's return in the Top 20 after 14 years. She also released a self-titled album which included her last three singles, some of her biggest hits from the early 1990s and a couple of brand new songs. However the album did not sell very well reaching number 63 on the official French album chart.

Throughout her career, Indra sold more than one million records in France and is in the Top 500 of the best-selling artists of all time in France.

Indra made a surprising come back in January 2009 as a stage actress in the comedy "Ma femme est folle" at the 'Théâtre des Nouveautés' in Paris, alongside Georges Beller, Steevy Boulay and Sonia Dubois. The first night was on January, 10 and performances were planned until the end of February, but due to the success of the play, performances had been extended until June.

In early 2009, it was also announced that Indra had recorded a full new album to be released in April called "One Woman Show". The album includes 12 tracks in English of dance-electro-pop. Including "Move In Time" co written by UK's queen of dance Tara McDonald.

Because of the success of "Ma femme est folle", the release of the album was first postponed to June, and then to September. In the meantime, "Upper hand (sexy mama)", the first single, was sent to the medias but due to the radios' lack of enthusiasm, the album was once more delayed and a new release date in November was announced. Finally, the album was made available for digital download only on 7 December. After one more delay, the physical release was finally available on 8 February 2010. The album suffered a total lack of promotion and did not reach the French album chart (Top 200).

=== 2010s ===
In June 2010, "High heels and backwards" has been announced to be the second single from "One woman show". Promos have been sent to radios and the song was remixed by 2FrenchGuys. However, the song did not make any impact on charts or radios.

In October 2010, Indra confirmed that she would be part of the tour "Dance Machine - La tournée des années 90", a series of concerts throughout France to celebrate the 1990s with 90's artists such as Gala, Corona, Worlds Apart, Larusso, Black Box and Benny B among others. Indra performed one or two songs (including her biggest hit "Misery") during each concert. A dozen of dates were planned in France's biggest towns from March 2011 and due to the success of the tour, more dates were announced from December 2011.

Indra also announced that she is continuing her stage actress career and that she had the lead female role in another comedy "Le clan des célibataires". Performances are planned throughout France from October 2011 until June 2012. Indra was replaced by "Plus belle la vie" actress, Léa François, during the December performances so that she can be on stage for the "Dance machine" tour.

She also had the leading role in an episode of the French docufiction TV series "Le jour où tout a basculé" which aired on France 2 in April 2012.

On 20 May 2013, Indra released a new single, a cover version of the track "It's on you" originally released by MC Sar & the Real McCoy in 1990. Several mixes of the single are available for download and a music video was also filmed. This is the first time that Indra released a song that is not produced by Orlando and the track has been released under a new music label.

In September 2013, she teamed up with David Stephan on his single "Feel my love" and has started to tour throughout France in her third play, a new adaptation of the classic "Ma femme s'appelle Maurice".

== Discography ==
=== Albums ===
- Temptation (1991) (this album was also released in Germany in 1992 under the title "Temptation - The Album" and was set to be released in Taiwan in 1994 but only a few promotional copies were actually available there) (France: #34)
- Together Tonight (1992) (France: #31)
- Best Of (1994)
- Anywhere (1995)
- You & Me (1999)
- Indra (2006) (France: #63)
- One Woman Show (2009: Digital release / 2010: Physical release)

=== Singles ===
- From Temptation:
  - Let's Go Crazy (1990) (France: #11; French Club Play Chart: #3)
  - Misery (1991) (France: #7; French Club Play Chart: #1)
  - Temptation (1991) (France: #7; French Club Play Chart: #1)
  - Tell Me (1992) (France: #17; French Club Play Chart: #7)
- From Together Tonight:
  - Gimme What's Real (1992) (France: #16; French Club Play Chart: #5)
  - Rescue Me (1993) (France: #38)
  - Yesterday Is History (Tomorrow is a mystery) (1993) (French Club Play Chart: #73)
- From Best Of ...:
  - Hollywood (1994) (French Club Play Chart: #36)
  - Save My Life (1994) (French Club Play Chart: #39)
- From Anywhere:
  - Anywhere (1995) (French Club Play Chart: #17)
  - We Belong Together (1995)
- From You & Me:
  - Message For You (1997) (French Club Play Chart: #41)
  - Never Never (1999) (France: #99)
- Reggae Life (1999) (with Michael Damian)
- From Indra:
  - Besoin De Vous (2004) (with Frédéric Lerner) (France: #47, Switzerland: #88)
  - Oublie-Moi (2005) (France: #39)
  - Sois Beau Et Tais-Toi (2006) (France: #16)
- From One Woman Show:
  - Upper Hand (Sexy mama) (2009) (promo only)
  - High Heels And Backwards (2010) (promo only)
- It's On You (2013)

=== Appearances ===
- Jusqu'au bout du rêve... (1995) (single with Dalida; taken from Dalida's remix album "Comme si j'étais là") (unreleased, promo only)
- Donnons-Nous La Main (2005) (charity single by "Donnons-Nous La Main")
- Tes yeux De Breizh (2013) (charity single by "Les Voix De La Breizh")
- Feel My Love (2013) (single with David Stephan)

== Filmography ==
=== Television ===
- Ce Soir, Je Passe A La Télé (1997–1998) (Herself, host)
- Je Suis Une Célébrité, Sortez-Moi De Là! (2006) (Herself, contestant)
- Le Jour Où Tout A Basculé (2012) (Sophie) (1 episode, "Par désespoir, j'ai piégé mon fan")
- Influences (2021) (Marjorie) (TV series)

=== Theatre ===
- Ma Femme Est Folle (2009) (Catherine)
- Le Clan Des Célibataires (2011–2012) (Léa)
- Ma Femme S'appelle Maurice (2013–2015) (Catherine)
