= Omar Harfouch =

Pianist and composer (born 1969)

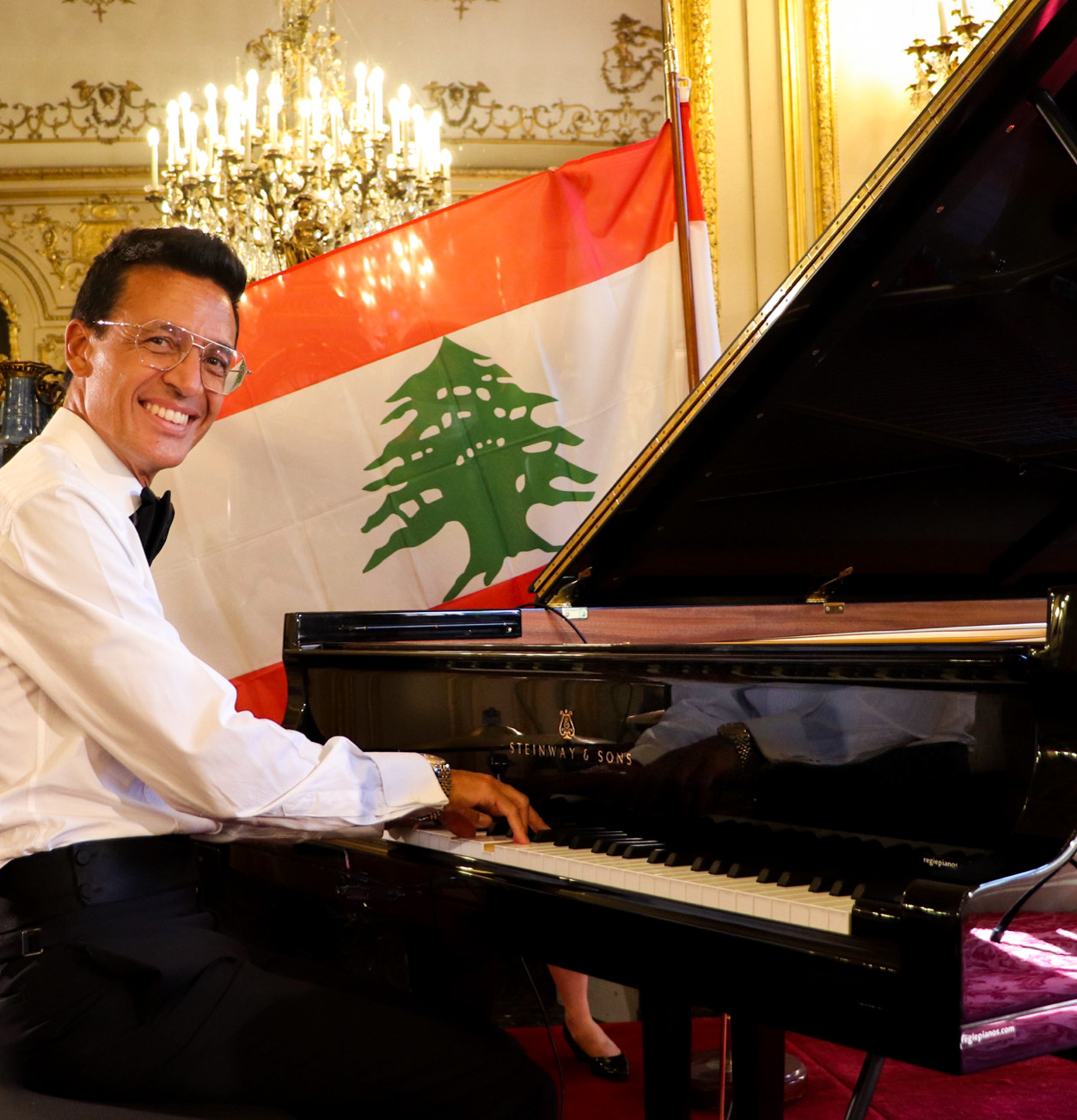
- Born: April 20, 1969 (age 57); Tripoli, Lebanon
- Citizenship: France; Lebanon
- Occupations: Pianist, composer, businessman

Omar Harfouch (Arabic: عمر حرفوش; born 20 April 1969 in Tripoli, Lebanon) is a French-Lebanese pianist, composer, and businessman. He is the owner of a communications group in Ukraine. He is known in France for his participation in the reality show I'm a Celebrity...Get Me Out of Here! and for his many appearances at jet set parties, in videos, and in celebrity magazines. He is a regular donor and guest at AMFAR charity dinner in Cannes. He is the co-owner of the international TV channel HDFashion & LifeStyle, and is the owner of the French magazine Entrevue.

== Early life ==
Omar Harfouch was born into a Sunni Muslim family in Tripoli, Lebanon. He studied piano at the Beirut Conservatory before relocating to Ukraine in the early 1990s, where he began working in the media and entertainment industries.

== Career ==
Durings the 1990s, Harfouch established several media businesses in Ukraine, including the television network SuperNova, the fashion magazine L'Officiel Ukraine, and the modeling agency SuperNova Models.

He became known to the general public in France in April 2006, when he took part in the reality show I'm a Celebrity...Get Me Out of Here! for the benefit of Reporters Without Borders. During the show, he became the center of a controversy when he said he was a victim of "racist remarks" by Marielle Goitschel, who in turn claimed to have treated him as "just a shrimp" (minus in French).

In May 2006, after participating in the radio broadcast of Cauet dechire on Fun Radio, he filed a complaint against Cauet for defamation and racial abuse for statements made during the show and published by the magazine Entrevue in July 2006. A few months later, Cauet was found guilty of public defamation of an individual and sentenced to a 500 euro fine and one euro in damages, including two against Geneviève de Fontenay, and four against Entrevue.

In October 2006, Harfouch released the book Mystères, scandales et... fortune (Mysteries, Scandals and... Fortune). The same year, he released his autobiography, Omar Harfouch: Confessions of a millionaire.

In 2023, he became the owner of the French magazine Entrevue.

On June 11–13, 2025, Harfouch was awarded a medal and the honorary title Compositeur honoris causa by the city of Béziers, France. The ceremony took place at the Béziers Conservatory, alongside composer Vladimir Cosma. In September 2025, Harfouch was awarded an order by Prince Emanuel Philibert of Savoy, as part of a ceremony honoring dynastic and cultural distinctions.

== Concerts ==
=== Concert for peace in Paris and the United Nations ===
On September 18, 2024, Harfouch presented his "Concerto for Peace" at the Théâtre des Champs-Élysées in Paris. The event, which featured the Béziers Méditerranée Symphony Orchestra under the direction of Mathieu Bonnin, was designed to promote global peace and unity through music. On September 20, 2024, the same concert was performed at the United Nations headquarters in Geneva, emphasizing Harfouch's commitment to using music as a humanitarian tool.

=== Historic concert in the Vatican ===
On November 15, 2024, Harfouch performed his "Concerto for Peace" in the Sistine Hall of the Vatican Library. This historic event marked the first-ever concert held in this sacred space. Following the performance, Harfouch was awarded the Vatican's 2025 Jubilee Medal by Pope Francis in recognition of his contribution to promoting peace through music. The event was attended by representatives of some of the world's most prominent libraries. In September 2025, The original score of "Concerto for Peace" was donated to the Vatican Library (Bibliotheca Apostolica Vaticana), becoming part of its permanent archives.

=== Dubai Opera ===
In December 2024, Harfouch brought his "Concert for Peace" to the Dubai Opera. The event, which celebrated unity and harmony, featured a special appearance by UNICEF Goodwill Ambassador Orlando Bloom. The concert included a 3D installation symbolizing the warmth and cultural unity of the Middle East, alongside a surprise performance by Chico & the Gypsies. This event underscored Harfouch's dedication to using music as a bridge between cultures and as a medium for promoting humanitarian initiatives.

In 2025, the work was performed at the Italian Parliament on May 7 in Rome, and later in Béziers, France.

== Other endeavors ==
Harfouch launched a large-scale anti-corruption project in Lebanon. Together with members of the European Parliament, he allegedly discovered in foreign accounts, and also claims to have seized the first $150 million stolen from the Lebanese budget. Harfouch was recognized for his work "Save a life, you save humanity" during the 11th edition of the Cael Awards in Dubai. The piece was presented in various significant venues, including the European Commission in Brussels, highlighting themes of harmony and solidarity.

On September 5, 2024, during the 81st Venice International Film Festival, Harfouch was honored with the Best Achievement for Peace Award. This was presented by actor Kevin Costner in recognition of Harfouch's dedication to promoting human rights and social causes. On November 15, 2024, Harfouch performed his "Concerto for Peace" in the Sistine Hall of the Vatican Library, marking the first time a concert was held in this sacred venue. Following his performance, he was awarded the 2025 Jubilee Medal by Pope Francis. In March 2025, he received the Women United for Peace award for his contributions to promoting peace.

== Reception ==
=== Elite affair ===
Beginning in 2001, Harfouch publicly alleged that senior executives associated with the Elite modeling agency had engaged in misconduct involving young models, in sexual harassment, sexual abuse, and other inappropriate behavior. He stated that his allegations were based on his experience as a former business partner involved with Elite Model Look competitions in several countries.

Elite denied the accusations and initiated legal proceedings against publications that had reported Harfouch's claims. Harfouch subsequently became the subject of media reports accusing him of offenses including procuring, money laundering, and having links to organized crime. Several of those reports were later challenged in court. In one case, the Tribune de Genève acknowledged that allegations against Harfouch had relied on a forged document, and reached a settlement with him after a defamation action.

=== Business disputes and Miss Europe ===
Harfouch organized the Miss Europe competition with Endemol, initially presented on the French TV channel TF1, but the channel decided to sell it. In 2006, Harfouch's company Super Nova Agency agreed with Endemol's Miss Europe Organisation to organize the Miss Europe 2006 pageant. Following disputes over the execution of the agreement, both parties initiated legal proceedings. In 2011, the Paris Court of Appeal upheld a lower court judgement ordering Harfouch and Super Nova Agency to pay more than €83,000 in damages to Endemol for failing to fulfill contractual obligations.

=== Miss Universe 2025 ===
In July 2025, Harfouch served as a judge on the Miss Universe 2025 competition in Thailand. He joined the elite panel of judges chaired by Raul Rocha. In November 2025, Harfouch resigned from the judging panel of the pageant, alleging that an unofficial committee had pre-selected finalists without the participation of the official judges and that the competition lacked transparency. He stated that he possessed recordings and other evidence supporting his allegations. The Miss Universe Organization denied the claims, stating that its judging procedures followed established protocols and that the selection process referenced by Harfouch was related to a separate initiative.

=== Miss Grand International All Stars ===
In 2026, Harfouch's participation as a judge in the inaugural Miss Grand International All Stars pageant attracted media attention after he awarded Laotian contestant Miranda Aengmany scores of 1 out of 10 in both the evening gown and "bare face" preliminary competitions. The scores generated criticism from pageant audiences and contestants. Harfouch later stated that his evaluations reflected an independent judging methodology, and defended the scores publicly.

== Personal life ==
=== Politics ===
Harfouch has campaigned for the establishment of a secular third republic. His positions have been reported in many Lebanese media outlets. He will go as far as announcing the creation of a Lebanese government in exile to get things moving. Then, he will run for the general elections on 15 May 2022 in the Tripoli constituency. He will not be elected, which will not prevent him from continuing to advocate for "a non-confessional elective system that guarantees greater representativeness and greater freedom to Lebanese citizens.

From the end of 2022, he increased his trips and international meetings to defend his institutional reform project. In Italy, he received the support of MP Roberto Bagnasco (Forza Italia), who, during a colloquium on 9 March 2023, declared: "The attention we pay to Lebanon is dictated by our desire to facilitate its transition to a third republic, more liberal, which goes beyond the confessional scheme, as advocated by our friend Harfouch." Harfouch also received the support of Carol Moseley Braun, the first African-American woman to be elected to the US Senate. This close friend of US President Joe Biden said at a press conference on 22 February 2023 that she would speak to the president about Harfouch and his Third Republic project.

Harfouch has also been noted for his statements on Israel. Following the historic agreement on the maritime border between Lebanon and Israel, he has advocated a lasting economic peace and campaigns for peaceful relations between the two countries..

In 2023, legal proceedings were initiated against Harfouch in Lebanon after he was accused of meeting with an Israeli journalist during a conference in Brussels, conduct that Lebanese authorities alleged violated Lebanese law. The case was subsequently raised in the French National Assembly through a written parliamentary question, in which a member of parliament asked the French government to comment on the proceedings and their implications for human rights. In its response, the French government stated that the matter fell under Lebanese law, while reaffirming France's commitment to human rights and opposition to antisemitism.

==== Reported ties to Muammar Gaddafi ====
According to an investigation published by Le Monde in September 2024, Robert Ménard, then head of Reporters Without Borders, had described Omar Harfouch in the mid-2000s as a “friend of Colonel Gaddafi.”
