= Secret Story (French TV series) season 11 =

Secret Story
- Season 11
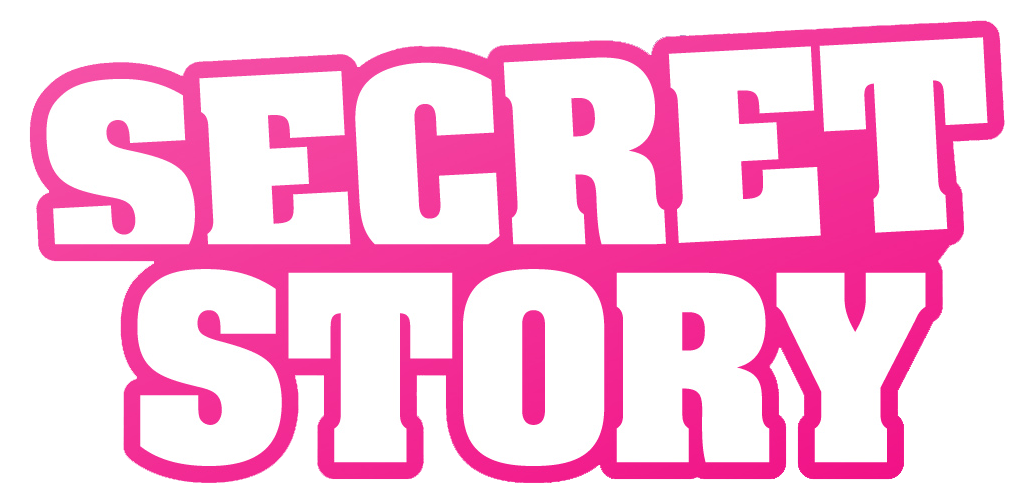
- Hosted by: Christophe Beaugrand
- No. of days: 98
- No. of housemates: 17
- Winner: Noré Tir
- Runner-up: Laura Lempika
- Companion show: Le Débrief

Release
- Original network: TF1 (first live show only); NT1
- Original release: 1 September – 7 December 2017

Season chronology
- ← Previous; Season 10 Next → Season 12

Secret Story 11 is the eleventh season of the French reality television series Secret Story, a show which is based loosely on the international Big Brother format.

The applications were opened on 11 May 2017 and was closed on 14 August 2017.

The season started on Friday 1 September 2017 on TF1. It was hosted by Christophe Beaugrand for the daily recaps and the live shows, on NT1. Adrien Lemaitre, Leila Ben Khalifa and Julien Geloën participate with the main host to "Le Débrief" on NT1.

Noré Tir won the series on Day 98.

== House of Secrets ==
For the fourth time, after Secret Story 8, Secret Story 9 and Secret Story 10, the house is located on the rooftop of the studios of AB Productions which was used in the 1990s where many popular sitcoms were filmed, as Hélène et les Garçons and Premiers baisers. Perched on a building, the House of Secrets offers to the contestants a wide view of Paris.

=== The Campus of Secrets ===
In this season, the House has become a Campus. The spirit of American universities is an integral part of the "Campus", and the magic spirit, as in Harry Potter is also present, as much in the decoration as in the mysteries of the game, and the game itself.

== Housemates ==
=== Alain ===
- Alain Rochette is 39 years old. He is from Valencia, Spain. He was a contestant from the seventeenth season of Gran Hermano Spain. He entered on Day 1. He was evicted on Day 91.

=== Barbara ===
- Barbara Opsomer is a 27 years old singer and actress. She is from Paris, France. She entered on Day 1. She finished in third place on Day 98.

=== Benjamin ===
- Benjamin Macé is 28 years old. He is from Bordeaux, France. He entered on Day 42. He was evicted on Day 62.

=== Benoît ===
- Benoît Douady is 27 years old. He is from Tours, France. He entered on Day 1. He was evicted on Day 84.

=== Bryan ===
- Bryan Dubois is a 21 years old management student. He is from Los Angeles, United States. Bryan was called Mister Buzz, and created “Showtime baby” which made a lot of noise. He entered on Day 1. He was evicted on Day 49.

=== Cassandre ===
- Cassandre Lapierre is 26 years old. She is from Cannes, France. She entered on Day 42. She was evicted on Day 56.

=== Charlène ===
- Charlène Le Mer is 23 years old. She is from Tours, France. She entered on Day 1. She finished in fourth place on Day 98.

=== Charles ===
- Charles Theyssier is a 28 years old barman. He is from Annemasse, France. He entered on Day 1. He was evicted on Day 14.

=== Jordan ===
- Jordan Aumaitre is a 28 years old bus driver. He is from Vieux-Condé, France. He entered on Day 1. He was evicted on Day 70.

=== Julie ===
- Julie Robert is a 20 years old model. She is from Paris, France. She entered on Day 1. She was evicted on Day 21.

=== Kamila ===
- Kamila Tir is 23 years old. She is from Marseille, France. She entered on Day 1. She was evicted on Day 90.

=== Laura ===
- Laura Lempika is 27 years old. She is from Cannes, France. She entered on Day 1. She is Marie's best friend. Her secret is: "My best friend sacrificed herself to let me enter the House of Secrets". She finished as the runner up on Day 98.

=== Lydia ===
- Lydia Serbout is a 28 years old marketing student. She is from Toulouse, France. She entered on Day 1. Her secret is: "I am the spy of Internet users". She was evicted on Day 7.

=== Makao ===
- Alain-Gloirdy Bakwa is a 26 years old service agent. He is from Tours, France. He entered on Day 1. He was evicted on Day 28.

=== Marie ===
- Marie Thomae is a 28 years old waitress. She didn't enter the house on Day 1. She is Laura's best friend. She sacrificed herself to let Laura enter the house. She came into the House on Day 62 as a fake new housemate, and she quit on Day 70.

=== Nony ===
- Anthony Kruger is 33 years old. He is from Müllheim, Germany. He is the former member of the Tribal King. His secret is: "I was number 1 in the top 50 for several weeks". He didn't enter the house on Day 1.

=== Noré ===
- Noré Tir is a 29 years old plumber. He is from Marseille, France. He entered on Day 1. He finished as the winner on Day 98.

=== Shirley ===
- Shirley Lamy is 22 years old. She is from Franconville, France. She entered on Day 42. On Day 70 she is the last housemate to have arrived after the launch of the program to be still in play. She was evicted on Day 78.

=== Tanya ===
- Tanya Drouginska is a 68 years old model, actress and singer. She is from Paris, France. She entered on Day 1. Her secret is: "I pose for the biggest fashion magazines around the world". She was evicted on Day 35.

=== Ylies ===
- Ylies Djiroun is a security guard from Marseille, France. His secret is: "I am European martial arts champion". He didn't enter the house on Day 1.

== Secrets ==
Name	Age	Country	Secret	Discovered by	Day entered	Day exited	Status
Noré	29	France	"We are married" (with Kamila)	Laura (Day 35)	1	98	Winner
Laura	28	United Arab Emirates	"My best friend sacrificed herself to let me enter the House of Secrets" (with Marie)	Noré (Day 87)	1	98	Runner-up
Barbara	27	France	"I tied my destiny to another Housemate"	Alain (Day 90)	1	98	3rd Place
Charlène	23	France	"We are a couple" (with Benoît)	Barbara (Day 66)	1	98	4th Place
Alain	39	Spain	"I'm a TV star abroad"	Kamila (Day 67)	1	91	Evicted
Kamila	24	France	"We are married" (with Noré)	Laura (Day 35)	1	90	Evicted
Benoît	26	France Tours	"We are a couple" (with Charlène)	Barbara (Day 66)	1	84	Evicted
Shirley	22	France	"My life almost ended during a carnival"	Noré (Day 68)	42	78	Evicted
Jordan	28	France	"I saved a family from drowning"	Undiscovered	1	70	Evicted
Benjamin	28	France	"I participated twice in the Olympic Games"	Undiscovered	42	62	Evicted
Cassandre	26	France	"I escaped a natural disaster"	Undiscovered	42	56	Evicted
Bryan	20	United States	"I am a multi-millionaire"	Himself (Day 42)	1	49	Evicted
Tanya	68	France	"I pose for the biggest fashion magazines around the world"	Undiscovered	1	35	Evicted
Makao	26	France	"I was bodyguard for the President of the Republic"	Undiscovered	1	28	Evicted
Julie	20	France	"I was raised among wild animals"	Undiscovered	1	21	Evicted
Charles	28	France	"I protected the biggest Hollywood stars"	Undiscovered	1	14	Evicted
Lydia	28	France	"I am the spy of Internet users"	Undiscovered	1	7	Evicted
Ylies	25	France	"I am European martial arts champion"	Himself (Day 1)	1	1	Not chosen
Nony	33	France	"I was number 1 in the top 50 for several weeks"	Himself (Day 1)	1	1	Not chosen
Marie	28	United Arab Emirates	"My best friend sacrificed herself to let me enter the House of Secrets" (with Laura)	Noré (Day 87)	1	1	Not chosen

== Nominations ==
	Week 1		Week 2	Week 3	Week 4	Week 5	Week 6	Week 7	Week 8	Week 9	Week 10		Week 11	Week 12	Week 13		Week 14		
	Day 1	Day 7	Week 2	Week 3	Week 4	Week 5	Week 6	Week 7	Week 8	Week 9	Day 68	Day 70	Week 11	Week 12	Day 89	Day 91	Day 95	Final	
Noré	Not; Eligible	Nominated	Not; Eligible	Julie; Tanya	Not; Eligible	No; Nominations	Nominated; Forever	No; Nominations	Barbara	No; Nominations	Saved	~~Alain~~; Shirley	Shirley; Barbara	Barbara; Charlène	Exempt	Finalist	Fake; Eviction	Winner (Day 98)	
Laura	Marie	Nominated	Alain; Charles	Not; Eligible	Benoît; Noré	Nominated	No; Nominations	No; Nominations	Not; Eligible	No; Nominations	Saved	Noré	~~Charlène~~	Benoît; Charlène	No; Nominations	No; Nominations	Saved	Runner-Up (Day 98)	
Barbara	Not; Eligible	Nominated	Noré; Jordan	Not; Eligible	Alain; Makao	No; Nominations	Nominated	Jordan	Not; Eligible	No; Nominations	No; Nominations	Benoit; Shirley	~~Charlène~~	Nominated	No; Nominations	No; Nominations	Saved	Third Place (Day 98)	
Charlène	Not; Eligible	Nominated	Alain; Charles	Not; Eligible	Alain; Makao	No; Nominations	Nominated; Forever	Secret; Room	Not; Eligible	No; Nominations	Saved	~~Alain~~; Shirley	Shirley; Barbara	Nominated	Nominated	Laura	~~Noré~~	Fourth Place (Day 98)	
Alain	Nominated	Nominated	Not; Eligible	Julie; Laura	Not; Eligible	No; Nominations	Exempt	No; Nominations	Shirley	No; Nominations	Fake; Nomination	Noré; Charlène	~~Charlène~~	Not; Eligible	No; Nominations	No; Nominations	Evicted (Day 91)		
Kamila	Not; Eligible	Nominated	Charles; Alain	Not; Eligible	Makao; Alain	No; Nominations	No; Nominations	Nominated; Forever	Nominated; Forever	No; Nominations	No; Nominations	~~Alain~~; Shirley	Shirley; Barbara	Not; Eligible	Nominated	Evicted (Day 90)			
Benoît	Not; Eligible	Nominated	Not; Eligible	Julie; Tanya	Not; Eligible	No; Nominations	Nominated	No; Nominations	Barbara	Nominated	No; Nominations	~~Alain~~; Shirley	Shirley; Barbara	Nominated	Evicted (Day 84)				
Shirley	Not in House							Exempt	Not; Eligible	Nominated	No; Nominations	Noré; Barbara	~~Charlène~~	Guest	Evicted (Day 78)				
Jordan	Not; Eligible	Exempt	Not; Eligible	Tanya; Julie	Not; Eligible	No; Nominations	Barbara	Nominated	Barbara	Nominated; Forever	Saved	~~Alain~~; Shirley	Evicted (Day 70)						
Benjamin	Not in House							Exempt	Cassandre; Shirley	Nominated	Evicted (Day 62)								
Cassandre	Not in House							Exempt	Nominated	Evicted (Day 56)									
Bryan	Not; Eligible	Nominated	Not; Eligible	Tanya; Julie	Not; Eligible	No; Nominations	Control; Tower	Nominated	Evicted (Day 49)										
Tanya	Alain	Nominated	Bryan; Makao	Not; Eligible	Makao; Bryan	Nominated	Evicted (Day 35)												
Makao	Not; Eligible	Nominated	Not; Eligible	Tanya; Kamila	Not; Eligible	Evicted (Day 28)													
Julie	Not; Eligible	Exempt	Alain; Benoît	Not; Eligible	Evicted (Day 21)														
Charles	Not; Eligible	Exempt	Not; Eligible	Evicted (Day 14)															
Lydia	Not; Eligible	Nominated	Evicted (Day 7)																
Nony	Nominated	Not chosen (Day 1)																	
Yiles	Nominated	Not chosen (Day 1)																	
Marie	Marie	Evicted (Day 1)									~~Alain~~	Guest	Evicted (Day 1)						
Up for eviction	Laura & Marie	Alain; Barbara; Benoît; Bryan; Charlène; Kamila; Laura; Lydia; Makao; Noré; Tanya	Alain; Charles	Julie; Tanya	Alain; Makao	Laura; Noré; Tanya	Barbara; Benoît; Charlène; Noré	Barbara; Bryan; Jordan; Kamila	Barbara; Cassandre; Kamila	Benjamin; Benoît; Jordan; Shirley	~~Alain~~; ~~Marie~~	Jordan; Noré; Shirley	Barbara; Shirley	Barbara; Benoît; Charlène	Charlène; Kamila	Alain; Barbara; Charlène; Laura	Barbara; Charlène; Laura; Noré		
Up for eviction	Alain; Nony; Yliès	Alain; Barbara; Benoît; Bryan; Charlène; Kamila; Laura; Lydia; Makao; Noré; Tanya	Alain; Charles	Julie; Tanya	Alain; Makao	Laura; Noré; Tanya	Barbara; Benoît; Charlène; Noré	Barbara; Bryan; Jordan; Kamila	Barbara; Cassandre; Kamila	Benjamin; Benoît; Jordan; Shirley	~~Alain~~; ~~Marie~~	Jordan; Noré; Shirley	Barbara; Shirley	Barbara; Benoît; Charlène	Charlène; Kamila	Alain; Barbara; Charlène; Laura	Barbara; Charlène; Laura; Noré		
Ejected	none										Laura fake ejection	none							
Evicted	Marie; Laura & Marie's choice to sacrifice	Lydia; 2% to save	Charles; 46.7% to save	Julie; 49.1% to save	Makao; 44.1% to save	Tanya; 11.1% to save	Charlène; 45% to fake evict	Bryan; 16.26% to save	Cassandre; 11.4% to save	Benjamin; 19.5% to save	None	Jordan; 10.1% to save	Shirley; 31.6% to save	Benoit; 14% to save	Kamila; 48% to save	Alain; 22% to save	Noré; Charlène's choice to fake evict	Charlène; 10.1% to win	Barbara; 12.5% to win
Evicted	Alain; Chosen by Tanya	Lydia; 2% to save	Charles; 46.7% to save	Julie; 49.1% to save	Makao; 44.1% to save	Tanya; 11.1% to save	Charlène; 45% to fake evict	Bryan; 16.26% to save	Cassandre; 11.4% to save	Benjamin; 19.5% to save	None	Jordan; 10.1% to save	Shirley; 31.6% to save	Benoit; 14% to save	Kamila; 48% to save	Alain; 22% to save	Noré; Charlène's choice to fake evict	Laura; 35.8% to win	Noré; 41.6% to win

=== Nominations : Results ===
Weeks	Nominated	Evicted
Week 1	Which of the best friends will sacrifice her place? Laura, Marie	Marie
Week 1	Who does Tanya wish to be in a false relationship? Alain, Nony, Yliès	Nony, Yliès
Week 1	Alain (5%), Barbara (6%), Benoît (6%), Bryan (7.5%), Charlène (9%), Kamila (14%), Laura (14%), Lydia (2%), Makao (15%), Noré (12%), Tanya (15%)	Lydia
Week 2	Alain (53.3%), Charles (46.7%)	Charles
Week 3	Julie (49.1%), Tanya (50.9%)	Julie
Week 4	Alain (55.9%), Makao (44.1%)	Makao
Week 5	Laura (35.8%), Noré (53.1%), Tanya (11.1%)	Tanya
Week 6	Benoît (9.3%), Barbara (19.7%), Charlène (45.6%), Noré (25.4%)	Charlène
Week 7	Barbara (33.64%), Bryan (16.26%), Jordan (17.29%), Kamila (32.81%)	Bryan
Week 8	Barbara (45.5%), Cassandre (11.4%), Kamila (43.1%)	Cassandre
Week 9	Benjamin (19.5%), Benoît (28.4%), Jordan (28.1%), Shirley (24%)	Benjamin
Week 10	Jordan (10.1%), Noré (19.4%), Shirley (70.5%)	Jordan
Week 11	Barbara (68.4%), Shirley (31.6%)	Shirley
Week 12	Barbara (64%), Benoît (14%), Charlène (22%)	Benoît
Week 13	Charlène (52%), Kamila (48%)	Kamila
Week 13	Alain (22%), Barbara (24%), Charlène (28%), Laura (26%)	Alain
Week 14 - Final	Barbara (12.5%), Charlène (10.1%), Laura (35,8%), Noré (41.6%)	Barbara, Charlène, Laura
