= Secret Story (French TV series) season 10 =

Secret Story
- Season 10
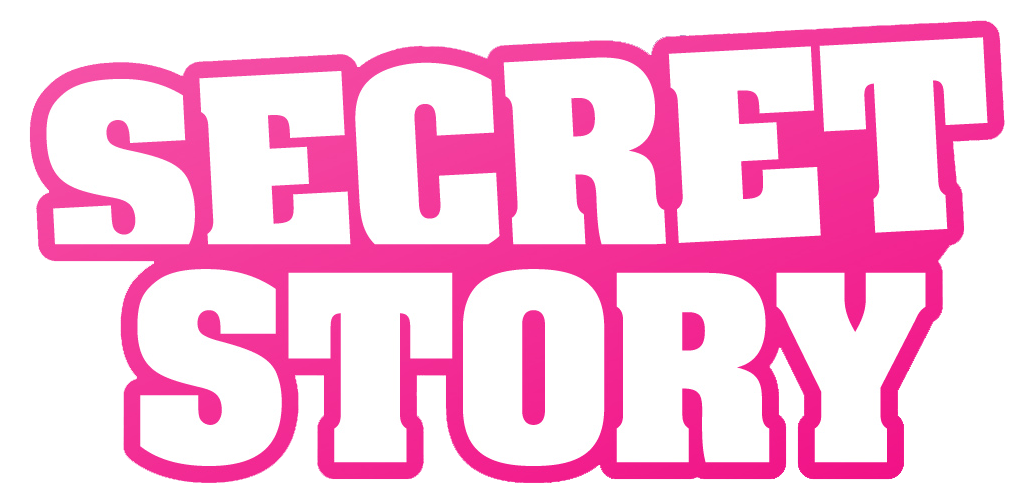
- Presented by: Christophe Beaugrand
- No. of days: 84
- No. of housemates: 18
- Winner: Julien
- Runner-up: Thomas
- Companion show: Le Débrief

Release
- Original network: TF1 (first live show only); NT1
- Original release: 26 August – 17 November 2016

Season chronology
- ← Previous; Season 9 Next → Season 11

Secret Story 10 is the tenth season of the French reality television series Secret Story, a show which is based loosely on the international Big Brother format and produced by Big Brother's production company Banijay. On 3 November 2015 NT1 and Christophe Beaugrand officially confirmed a tenth season.

It was confirmed both daily recaps and live shows air on NT1.

Julien Geloën won the series on Day 84.

== House of Secrets ==
For the third time, after Secret Story 8 and Secret Story 9, the house is located on the rooftop of the studios of AB Productions which was used in the 1990s where many popular sitcoms were filmed, as Hélène et les Garçons and Premiers baisers. Perched on a building, the House of Secrets offers to the contestants a wide view of Paris.

== Housemates ==
=== Alexandre ===
- Alexandre ?? is 30. He is from France. He entered on Day -3 in the "Secret Boat" but he didn't enter Day 1 on the House.

=== Anaïs ===
- Anaïs Casumaro is 20. She is from Aubagne, France. She entered on Day 1 in the Main House. She shares a secret with her twin sister Manon, to be the Mistresses of the Identities. They have a special and important secret mission to complete during the first week. She finished in fourth place on Day 84.

=== Athénaïs ===
- Athénaïs de Truchis is a 26-year-old hostess in event, from St Germain En Laye, France. She entered on Day 1 in the Main House, and entered as single, she comes from an aristocratic family, she sings, she dances. She was evicted on Day 28.

=== Bastien ===
- Bastien Grimal is a 28-year-old New York City, United States. He entered on Day 1 in the Main House. His secret is to be the alibi of Julien's and Sophia's secret, he must create a fake couple with Sophia to protect their secret. Bastien is a player, a seducer, he entered in the house as single, and likes brunettes.

=== Damien ===
- Damien Gomes is 24 years old. He is from Nogent-sur-Marne, France. He entered on Day 1, in the Main House. He has a girlfriend but still lives with his parents, he has Portuguese origins, he plays football, he loves making jokes and he once saved his cousin from drowning in a pool. He was evicted on Day 7.

=== Darko ===
- Darko Bozovic is 24, from Paris, France. He works as a waiter, he's single, origin Serbian, when he was born his mother was 16 years old, and he stayed 8 years with someone and recently broke up. He pretends to be the best liar in the world. He entered on Day 1 in the Secret Hotel. His secret is : "I'm international star of E-sports". He was evicted on Day 70.

=== Fanny ===
- Fanny Rodrigues is 24. She is from Oliveira de Azeméis, Portugal. She originally is from Switzerland but lives in Portugal for 4 years with her fiancé João. Her family is her strength, she shares everything with her fiancé João and she loves fashion and has a clothing store. Very playful and combative, she hopes to be a finalist of Secret Story 10, in France. She entered on Day 1 in the Main House. Her secret is : "I already participated twice to Secret Story" (having previously competed on the Portuguese version). She was evicted on Day 63.

=== Jaja ===
- Jawad Moussaoui is 23. He is from Paris, France. Jaja works as a hairdresser, he is single and eats all day. He falls in love very fast, example : just with a simple Facebook message. He is funny and is Ch'ti. He entered on Day -3 in the "Secret Boat" and entered on Day 1 in the Secret Hotel. His secret is : "Three winners of Secret Story chose me to enter the House of Secrets". He shares this secret with Sarah. He was evicted on Day 35.

=== Julien ===
- Julien Geloën is 23. He is from Cannes, France. Julien is a D.J. He entered on Day 1 in the Main House, his secret is : "We are a couple" with Sophia. He became the winner on Day 84.

=== Liam ===
- Léa ?? is 22. She is from Saint-Tropez, France. She entered on Day -3 in the "Secret Boat" but she didn't enter Day 1 on the House.

=== Maeva ===
- Maeva Pellerin is a 24-years-old commercial communication advisor from Nantes, France. She is a professional dancer, she is smart, stubborn, when she was 12, she learned the identity of her real father. She entered on Day 1 in the Main House. She was evicted on Day 42.

=== Manon ===
- Manon Casumaro is 20. She is from Aubagne, France. She shares a secret with her twin sister Anaïs, to be the Mistresses of the Identities. They have a special and important secret mission to complete during the first week. She was evicted on Day 49.

=== Marvin ===
- Marvin Tillière is 22. He is from Paris, France. Marvin works as a trainer, since he is 10, he has no contact with his father. He entered on Day 1 in the Main House. His secret is : "I've got the keys of the House's mailbox". He was ejected on Day 39.

=== Mélanie ===
- Mélanie Dedigama is a 26-years-old model from Genève, Switzerland. She likes dance and theatre, she defines herself as funny, smart, and she prefers to be around beautiful girls than the others. She entered on Day 1 in the Secret Hotel. She finished in third place on Day 84.

=== Pierre ===
- Pierre Abena is a 26 year old model and actor from Paris who lives in Los Angeles. He is the son of an Italian mother and a Cameroonian father. Pierre has two sisters in Paris and has a long-term girlfriend. Before his modelling career he was a professional basketball player in France. As for acting he was in the movie "The Perfect Match"in 2016.

=== Sarah ===
- Sarah Lopez is 25, from Livry-Gargan, France. She works as a hostess in a tanning center. Her parents are divorced and she lives with her mother. She entered on Day -3 in the "Secret Boat" and entered Day 1 in the Secret Hotel. She shares a secret with Jaja, her secret is : "Three winners of Secret Story chose me to enter the House of Secrets". She was evicted on Day 78.

=== Sophia ===
- Sophia Lazare is 31. She is from Cannes, France. She is a dancer. She entered on Day 1 in the Main House. Her secret is : "We are a couple", with Julien. As a way to protect this secret, she has the first week to fake a beginning of romance with Bastien. She was evicted on Day 14.

=== Thomas ===
- Thomas Beatie is 42 years old. He is from Phoenix, United States. He is a writer and a lecturer. He entered on Day 1 in the Main House. His secret is : "I'm the first pregnant man ever". He finished as the runner up on Day 84.

== Secrets ==
Name	Age	Country	Secret	Discovered by	Status
Julien	23	France	"We are a couple" (with Sophia)	Undiscovered	Winner (Day 84)
Thomas	42	United States	"I'm the first pregnant man ever"	Marvin (Day 28)	Runner-Up (Day 84)
Mélanie	26	Switzerland	"A city bears my name as a tribute to my ancestors"	Thomas (Day 78)	Finalist (Day 84)
Anaïs	20	France	"We are Mistresses of Identities" (with Manon)	Fanny (Day 34)	Finalist (Day 84)
Sarah	25	France	"Three winners of Secret Story chose me to enter the House of Secrets" (with Jaja)	Darko (Day 69)	Evicted (Day 78)
Bastien	28	United States	"I'm the alibi of Julien's and Sophia's secret"	Undiscovered	Evicted (Day 77)
Darko	25	France	"I'm international star of E-sports"	Julien (Day 24)	Evicted (Day 70)
Fanny	24	Portugal	"I already participated twice to Secret Story"	Anaïs (Day 50)	Evicted (Day 63)
Manon	20	France	"We are Mistresses of Identities" (with Anaïs)	Fanny (Day 34)	Evicted (Day 49)
Maeva	23	France	"I'm champion of international car wash"	Undiscovered	Evicted (Day 42)
Marvin	22	France	"I've got the keys of the House's mailbox"	Undiscovered	Ejected (Day 39)
Jaja	23	France	"Three winners of Secret Story chose me to enter the House of Secrets" (with Sarah)	Darko (Day 69)	Evicted (Day 35)
Athénais	26	France	"I was transplanted three times"	Undiscovered	Evicted (Day 28)
Pierre	25	United States	"I'm the face of an international brand"	Undiscovered	Evicted (Day 21)
Sophia	31	France	"We are a couple" (with Julien)	Undiscovered	Evicted (Day 14)
Damien	23	France	"The film in which I played won the Golden Palm in Cannes"	Undiscovered	Evicted (Day 7)

== Nominations ==
	Week 1	Week 2	Week 3	Week 4		Week 5	Week 6	Week 7		Week 8	Week 9	Week 10	Week 11		Week 12 Final	
	Week 1	Week 2	Week 3	Day 21	Day 26	Week 5	Week 6	Day 47	Day 48	Week 8	Week 9	Week 10	Day 76	Day 77	Week 12 Final	
Head of Identities	Anaïs, Manon						Secret; Discovered									
Identity Stolen	Not; Used	Julien	Not; Used	Not; Available		Sarah	Secret; Discovered									
Nominations	Not; Used	Mélanie; Sophia	Not; Used	Not; Available		Thomas; Jaja	Secret; Discovered									
Julien	No; Nominations	~~Manon~~; ~~Fanny~~	Not; Eligible	Exempt	Not; Eligible	Not; Eligible	Exempt	Darko; Sarah	No; Nominations	No; Nominations	Nominated	No; Nominations	Bastien	No; Nominations	Winner (Day 84)	
Thomas	Nominated	Manon; Athénaïs	Not; Eligible	Exempt	Not; Eligible	Not; Eligible	Nominated	Julien; Sarah	Nominated	No; Nominations	Not; Eligible	Nominated	No; Nominations	No; Nominations	Runner-Up (Day 84)	
Mélanie	Nominated	Not; Eligible	Pierre; Darko	Sarah; Fanny	Athénaïs; Maeva	Thomas; Marvin	Exempt	Darko; Sarah	No; Nominations	No; Nominations	Fanny; Julien	Nominated	No; Nominations	No; Nominations	Third Place (Day 84)	
Anaïs	No; Nominations	Not; Eligible	Thomas; Marvin	Jaja; Sarah	Not; Eligible	Jaja; Thomas	Exempt	Darko; Sarah	No; Nominations	No; Nominations	Not; Eligible	No; Nominations	Exempt		Fourth Place (Day 84)	
Sarah	No; Nominations	Not; Eligible	Thomas; Julien	Mélanie; Bastien	Athénaïs; Maeva	~~Marvin~~; ~~Thomas~~	Exempt	Thomas; Anaïs	Manon	Nominated	Not; Eligible	Exempt	No; Nominations	No; Nominations	Evicted (Day 78)	
Bastien	No; Nominations	Manon; Maeva	Not; Eligible	Sarah; Jaja	Not; Eligible	Not; Eligible	Exempt	Darko; Sarah	No; Nominations	Nominated	Secret; Room	Nominated	Nominated	Evicted (Day 77)		
Darko	No; Nominations	Mélanie; Sophia	Not; Eligible	Exempt	Exempt	Exempt	Exempt	Thomas; Manon	Saved	No; Nominations	Not; Eligible	Nominated	Evicted (Day 70)			
Fanny	No; Nominations	Not; Eligible	Thomas; Julien	Mélanie; Athénaïs	Athénaïs; Maeva	Marvin; Thomas	Exempt	Thomas; Manon	No; Nominations	No; Nominations	Nominated	Bastien	Evicted (Day 63)			
Manon	No; Nominations	Not; Eligible	Thomas; Julien	Mélanie; Maeva	Not; Eligible	Thomas; Bastien	Exempt	Darko; Sarah	Nominated	Evicted (Day 49)						
Maeva	No; Nominations	Not; Eligible	Pierre; Darko	Sarah; Fanny	Nominated	Jaja; Thomas	Nominated	Evicted (Day 42)								
Marvin	No; Nominations	Mélanie; Sophia	Not; Eligible	Mélanie; Manon	Not; Eligible	Not; Eligible	Ejected (Day 39)									
Jaja	No; Nominations	Sophia; Maeva	Not; Eligible	Mélanie; Bastien	Not; Eligible	Not; Eligible	Evicted (Day 35)									
Athénaïs	No; Nominations	Not; Eligible	Pierre; Darko	Sarah; Fanny	Nominated	Evicted (Day 28)										
Pierre	Nominated	Mélanie; Sophia	Not; Eligible	Evicted (Day 21)												
Sophia	No; Nominations	Not; Eligible	Evicted (Day 14)													
Damien	Nominated	Evicted (Day 7)														
Up for eviction	Damien; Mélanie; Pierre; Thomas	Mélanie; Sophia	Darko; Julien; Pierre; Thomas	Fanny; Mélanie; Sarah	Athénaïs; Maeva; Mélanie	Jaja; Thomas	Maeva; Thomas	Darko; Sarah	Manon; Thomas	Bastien; Sarah	Fanny; Julien	Bastien; Darko; Mélanie; Thomas	Bastien; Julien	Julien; Mélanie; Sarah; Thomas	Anaïs; Julien; Mélanie; Thomas	
Nominations Notes	1	2	3	4	5, 6	6, 7										
Ejected	none						Marvin	none								
Evicted	Damien; 10% to save	Sophia; 36.8% to save	Pierre; 17.6% to save	None	Athénaïs; 25% to save	Jaja; 26% to save	Maeva; 40% to save	None	Manon; 41% to save	Bastien; 54% to fake evict	Fanny; 25% to save	Darko; 19.0% to save	Bastien; 31.0% to save	Sarah; 19.3% to save	Anaïs; 13% to win	Mélanie; 17% to win
Evicted	Damien; 10% to save	Sophia; 36.8% to save	Pierre; 17.6% to save	None	Athénaïs; 25% to save	Jaja; 26% to save	Maeva; 40% to save	None	Manon; 41% to save	Bastien; 54% to fake evict	Fanny; 25% to save	Darko; 19.0% to save	Bastien; 31.0% to save	Sarah; 19.3% to save	Thomas; 28% to win	Julien; 42% to win

=== Notes ===
^Note 1: In round one of nominations, the Main House housemates fail to identify the identities of the Secret Hotel housemates, therefore Anaïs and Manon are saved and must pre-nominate six housemates : Damien, Pierre, Maeva, Mélanie, Sophia and Thomas. The six pre-nominees were facing a game in which Maeva and Sophia were saved, letting Damien, Mélanie, Pierre and Thomas face eviction.
^Note 2: In round two of nominations, male housemates nominate female housemates. Following the passage of the boys in the confessional, Manon, Sophia and Mélanie arrive ex aequo in the votes. But the power of the Mistresses of the Identities, Manon and Anaïs, allows the twins to replace Julien's vote by the girls of their choice, to avoid to Manon to be nominated. They replaced his vote by Mélanie and Sophia.
^Note 3: In round three of nominations, female housemates nominate male housemates. Anaïs and Manon decided not to use their power to steal an identity.
^Note 4: In round four of nominations, all the housemates were able to nominate and be nominated except Darko, Julien and Julien because they were currently up for eviction.
^Note 5: Fanny, Mélanie and Sarah can espace the nomination by challenging some of the housemates to give in to temptation. They put Jaja face the temptation, he yielded to the temptation by agreeing to see a message from his family which automatically provides a switch card that will allow one of the nominees to escape the nomination.
^Note 6: Fanny, Mélanie and Sarah put Darko face the temptation for winning a place in the semi-final. Darko has agreed to receive the place in the semifinals which automatically provides a second switch card to the three nominees.
^Note 7: In round six of nominations (week 5), female housemates nominate male housemates. Anaïs and Manon decided to use their power as the Mistresses of the Identities and replaced Sarah's vote by Thomas and Jaja.

=== Nominations : Results ===
Weeks	Nominated	Evicted
Week 1	Damien (10%), Mélanie (12,9%), Pierre (19,9%), Thomas (57,2%)	Damien
Week 2	Mélanie (63,2%), Sophia (36,8%)	Sophia
Week 3	Darko (18,3%), Julien (36,6%), Pierre (17,6%), Thomas (27,5%)	Pierre
Week 4	Athénaïs (25%), Maeva (47%), Mélanie (28%)	Athénaïs
Week 5	Jaja (26%), Thomas (74%)	Jaja
Week 6	Maeva(40%), Thomas (60%)	Maeva
Week 7	Manon (41%), Thomas (59%)	Manon
Week 8	Bastien (54%), Sarah (46%)	Bastien (Fake Nom.)
Week 9	Fanny (25%), Julien (75%)	Fanny
Week 10	Bastien (30%), Darko (19%), Mélanie (22%), Thomas (29%)	Darko
Week 11 (1)	Bastien (31%), Julien (69%)	Bastien
Week 11 (2)	Julien (36,2%), Mélanie (22,3%), Sarah (19,3%), Thomas (22,2%)	Sarah
Week 12 - Final	Julien (42%), Thomas (28%), Mélanie (17%), Anaïs (13%)	Thomas, Mélanie, Anaïs
