= Secret Story (French TV series) season 13 =

Secret Story
- Season 13
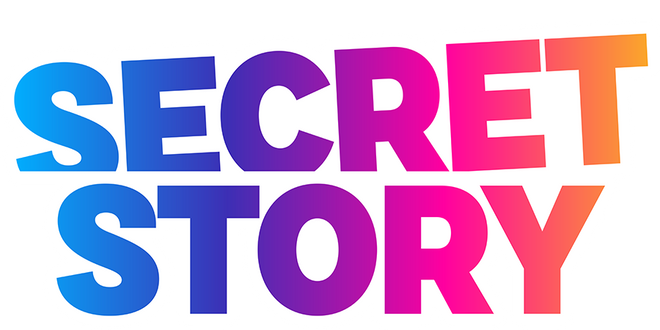
- Hosted by: Christophe Beaugrand
- No. of days: 60
- No. of housemates: 14
- Winner: Romy-Line Loyez
- Runner-up: Ethan Hazard

Release
- Original network: TF1 (first live show only); TFX
- Original release: 10 June – 7 August 2025

Season chronology
- ← Previous; Season 12

Secret Story 13 is the thirteenth season of the French reality television series Secret Story, based on the international Big Brother format.

On May 20, 2025, TF1 confirmed the return of the series for a thirteenth season. It started on June 10, 2025.

== Housemates ==
=== Adrien ===
- Adrien Aucouturier is 24 years old. He is from Saint-Palais, France, and lives in Bali, Indonesia.

=== Aïmed ===
- Aïmed Boualaoui is 25 years old. He is from Épinay-sur-Seine, France.

=== Anita ===
- Aminata (Anita) Cheick-Touré is 21 years old. She is from Nice, France.

=== Célia ===
- Célia Mejjati is 20 years old. She is Belgian, and lives in Miami, Florida, USA.

=== Constance ===
- Constance Omar is 22 years old. She is from Normandie, France.

=== Damien ===
- Damien Muller is 25 years old. He is from Alsace, France.

=== Dréa ===
- Andréa (Dréa) Yang (양이레; Yang Irae) is 19 years old. She lives in Paris.

=== Ethan ===
- Ethan Hazard is 21 years old. He is from La Louvière, Belgium.

=== Marianne ===
- Marianne Desrumaux is 32 years old. She is from the Vosges, France.

=== Mayer ===
- Mayer Ramouki is 24 years old. He is from Paris, France.

=== Noah ===
- Noah Djebali is 19 years old. He is French, and lives in Philadelphia, Pennsylvania, USA.

=== Pimprenelle ===
- Pimprenelle Diskeuve is 26 years old. She is from Namur, Belgium, and resides in Bali, Indonesia.

=== Romy ===
- Romy-Line Loyez is 29 years old. She is from Lille, France.

=== Théo ===
- Théo Fausser is 24 years old. He is from Strasbourg, France.

== Houseguests ==
=== Amélie ===
- Amélie Neten is a contestant who previously appeared on Secret Story 4. She entered in the house from Day 24 to Day 29. She had the Immune Ring, and gives it to Romy.

=== Vivian ===
- Vivian is a contestant who previously appeared on Secret Story 8. He entered in the house from Day 24 to Day 29. He had the Nomination Ring, and gives it to Pimprenelle.

=== Mélanie ===
- Mélanie Da Cruz is a contestant who previously appeared on Secret Story 9. She entered in the house from Day 24 to Day 29. She had the Switch Ring, and gives it to Mayer.

=== Lou ===
- Lou Videau is a contestant who previously appeared on Secret Story 12. She entered in the house from Day 24 to Day 29. She had the Jackpot Exchange Ring, and gives it to Ethan.

== Secrets ==
Name	Age	Residence	Secret	Discovered by	Status
Romy	29	France	"I have been a viral phenomenon"	Constance (Day 45)	Winner
Ethan	21	Belgium	"My brother is a living soccer legend"	Pimprenelle (Day 14)	Runner-up
Anita	21	France	"Our past history binds our fate in the game" (with Noah)	Undiscovered and reveal by herself Day 57	3rd Place
Noah	19	USA	"Our past history binds our fate in the game" (with Anita)	Undiscovered and reveal by himself Day 57	4th Place
Aïmed	25	France	"We are the guardians of transparency" (with Célia)	Anita (Day 23)	Evicted (Day 52)
Constance	22	France	"We are a fake couple" (with Damien)	Undiscovered and revealed by herself Day 52	Evicted (Day 45)
Mayer	24	France	"I am one of the 1% of the world's population with an IQ over 134"	Anita (Day 56)	Walked (Day 40)
Pimprenelle	26	Belgium	"Half my face has been reconstructed"	Adrien (Day 31)	Evicted (Day 38)
Adrien	24	France	"I learned about my sister's existence when I was 16"	Romy (Day 54)	Evicted (Day 38)
Célia	20	USA, Belgium	"We are the guardians of transparency" (with Aïmed)	Romy (Day 28)	Evicted (Day 31)
Marianne	32	France	"I have 11 names"	Undiscovered and reveal Day 55	Evicted (Day 24)
Damien	25	France	"We are a fake couple" (with Constance)	Undiscovered and revealed by himself Day 52	Evicted (Day 17)
(Yang) Dréa Irae	19	France	"I won a k-pop talent show in South Korea"	Anita (Day 54)	Evicted (Day 17)
Théo	24	France	"I lived in my car for six months"	Romy and Ethan (Day 55)	Evicted (Day 10)

- Aïmed and Célia can spy on the other Housemates and on both Houses; they have the ability to choose to be "transparent", or reveal videos of housemate conversations to all housemates.
- If either Anita and Noah are nominated, the other is automatically nominated as well.
- Constance and Damien are a fake couple.

== Nominations ==
	Week 1						Week 2			Week 3		Week 4	Week 5		Week 6		Week 7	Week 8	
	Day 1	Day 3	Day 6	Day 7	Day 8	Day 9	Day 10	Day 15	Day 17	Day 21	Day 22	Week 4	Day 32	Day 36	Day 42	Day 43	Week 7	Week 8	
Romy	No; Nominations	Crystal; House	No; Nominations	Théo	No; Nominations	Dréa to save	Dréa	2x Damien; Adrien	No; Nominations	Adrien; Pimprenelle	Adrien	Célia; Adrien	Crystal; House	Noah; Pimprenelle	Constance; Anita	Ethan	Ethan to save	Winner (Day 59)	
Ethan	No; Nominations	No; Nominations	Crystal; House	Crystal; House	Pimprenelle; Théo	Dréa to save	Dréa	~~Adrien~~; Célia	Nominated	Adrien; Pimprenelle	Adrien	Célia; Adrien	No; Nominations	Adrien; Pimprenelle	Aïmed; Anita	Aïmed	Romy to save	Runner-Up (Day 59)	
Anita	Romy	No; Nominations	No; Nominations	Théo	No; Nominations	Dréa to save	Banned	Ethan; Mayer	No; Nominations	Banned	Banned	Crystal; House	Constance	Adrien; Pimprenelle	Constance; Ethan	Ethan	Romy to save	Third Place (Day 59)	
Noah	No; Nominations	No; Nominations	Ethan	Not; Eligible	No; Nominations	Marianne to save	Mayer	Ethan; Mayer	No; Nominations	Mayer; Ethan	~~Mayer~~	~~Constance~~; Célia	Crystal; House	Constance; Ethan	Constance; Romy	Ethan	Anita to save	Fourth Place (Day 59)	
Aïmed	Célia	Constance	No; Nominations	Dréa	No; Nominations	Pimprenelle to save	Mayer	Ethan; Mayer	No; Nominations	Mayer; Ethan	~~Mayer~~	Ethan; ~~Constance~~	No; Nominations	Constance; Ethan	Anita; Constance	Ethan	Romy to save	Evicted (Day 52)	
Constance	No; Nominations	Crystal; House		Dréa	No; Nominations	Théo to save	Dréa	~~Adrien~~; Aïmed	No; Nominations	Adrien; Pimprenelle	Adrien	Adrien; Noah	Crystal; House	Aïmed; Noah	Banned	Banned	Evicted (Day 45)		
Mayer	No; Nominations	Crystal; House			No; Nominations	Dréa to save	Dréa	~~Adrien~~; Aïmed	Nominated	Marianne; Adrien; Pimprenelle	Adrien	Célia; Adrien; Aïmed	No; Nominations	Adrien; Pimprenelle	Walked (Day 40)				
Pimprenelle	Damien	No; Nominations	No; Nominations	Dréa	Crystal; House	Nominated	Not; Eligible	Ethan; Mayer	No; Nominations	Mayer; Ethan	~~Mayer~~	~~Romy~~; Ethan	No; Nominations	Ethan; Romy	Evicted (Day 38)				
Adrien	Mayer	No; Nominations	No; Nominations	Dréa	No; Nominations	Théo to save	Mayer	Ethan; Mayer; Damien	No; Nominations	Mayer; Romy	~~Mayer~~	~~Constance~~; ~~Romy~~	Crystal; House	Constance; Romy	Evicted (Day 38)				
Célia	No; Nominations	Crystal; House		Dréa	No; Nominations	Théo to save	Dréa	Ethan; Anita	No; Nominations	Ethan; Anita	~~Mayer~~	Mayer; Ethan	Evicted (Day 31)						
Marianne	No; Nominations	No; Nominations	No; Nominations	Crystal; House	Crystal; House	Nominated	Not; Eligible	Ethan; Mayer	No; Nominations	Romy; Ethan	~~Mayer~~	Evicted (Day 24)							
Damien	No; Nominations	Crystal; House		Marianne	No; Nominations	Dréa to save	Dréa	~~Adrien~~; Aïmed	Nominated	Evicted (Day 17)									
Dréa	No; Nominations	No; Nominations	No; Nominations	Crystal; House	Crystal; House	Not; Eligible	Mayer	Ethan; Mayer	Evicted (Day 17)										
Théo	No; Nominations	No; Nominations	No; Nominations	Not; Eligible	Crystal; House	Nominated	Evicted (Day 10)												
Nominations Notes	1	2	3	4				8	9	10, 11, 12	13, 14	15, 16, 17							
Up for Eviction	None					Marianne; Pimprenelle; Théo	None	Damien; Dréa; Ethan; Mayer	Damien; Ethan; Mayer	None	Constance; Ethan; Marianne	Adrien; Aïmed; Célia; Pimprenelle	None	Constance; Adrien; Pimprenelle; Ethan; Mayer	None	Anita; Constance; Ethan	Aïmed; Anita; Ethan	Anita; Ethan; Noah; Romy	
Walked	none														Mayer	none			
Moves and Evictees	Célia, Damien, Mayer, Romy to move	Constance; Aïmed's decision to move	Ethan; Noah's decision to move	Dréa; Constance's decision to move Marianne; Damien's decision to move	Théo, Pimprenelle; Ethan's decision to move	Théo; Fewest votes to save	Dréa; 6 of 10 votes to nominate	Dréa; Fewest votes out of 4	Damien; Fewest votes out of 3	Ethan nominated Tie between Mayer; Adrien; Pimprenelle to nominate	Marianne; Fewest votes to save	Célia; Fewest votes to save	Constance to nominate	Adrien, Pimprenelle; Fewest votes to save	Anita; Constance nominated Tie between Aïmed; Ethan; Romy	Constance; Fewest votes to save	Aïmed; Fewest votes to save	Noah; 3% to win	Anita; 9% to win
Moves and Evictees	Célia, Damien, Mayer, Romy to move	Constance; Aïmed's decision to move	Ethan; Noah's decision to move	Dréa; Constance's decision to move Marianne; Damien's decision to move	Théo, Pimprenelle; Ethan's decision to move	Théo; Fewest votes to save	Dréa; 6 of 10 votes to nominate	Dréa; Fewest votes out of 4	Damien; Fewest votes out of 3	Ethan nominated Tie between Mayer; Adrien; Pimprenelle to nominate	Marianne; Fewest votes to save	Célia; Fewest votes to save	Constance to nominate	Adrien, Pimprenelle; Fewest votes to save	Anita; Constance nominated Tie between Aïmed; Ethan; Romy	Constance; Fewest votes to save	Aïmed; Fewest votes to save	Ethan; 16% to win	Romy; 72% to win

=== Notes ===
^Note 1: The Housemates in the House of Secrets (Main House) failed to correctly guess the number of contestants living in the Crystal House, allowing the contestants in the Crystal House to become full contestants and move into the Main House. Previously, each of them would have chosen their replacement.
^Note 2: Aïmed paid €2,5000 from his pot to decide which housemates would be swapped between the Main and Crystal Houses. He chose to move Romy back to the Main House and send Constance to the Crystal House.
^Note 3: On Day 6, Noah was chosen by housemates who had not been to the Crystal House to choose between himself, Dréa, Ethan, Marianne and Théo to send to the Crystal House. He decided to send Ethan.
^Note 4: Ethan was not eligible to be sent to the Main House as he just came from the Main House. Célia was sent to the Main House.
^Note 8: Adrien bought a Switch card, which allowed him to switch one nominee for another contestant. He swapped himself for Damien when he was nominated.
^Note 9: After Dréa was eliminated by the Red Phone, the votes for the other nominees were reset to zero.
^Note 10: Noah chose to block Anita's nomination in order to obtain a clue about Marianne's secret.
^Note 11: Constance was nominated by the Red Phone during the Prime.
^Note 12: Mayer chose to nominate Marianne over Romy in the Jungle of Decisions.
^Note 13: A tiebreaker vote between Adrien, Mayer and Pimprenelle was held to decide the final nominee after Ethan, Marianne, and Constance.
^Note 14: After gaining the power of the Jungle of Decisions, Ethan chose to save Mayer, in a decision between himself, Mayer, Constance and Marianne.
^Note 15: During the Prime, Noah had the mission to falsely evict Anita; in reality, she joined the Crystal Room with past contestants Amélie, Mélanie, Lou and Vivian.
^Note 16: The houseguests had different Ring powers. Amélie choose to grant Romy immunity. Vivian choose to nominate Pimprenelle. Mélanie choose Mayer to switch nominees. Mayer choose to switch Constance with Aïmed for nominee.
^Note 17: After their decisions on the bridge of sacrifices, Constance, Célia and Romy each had two additional votes against them.
