= Secret Story (French TV series) season 14 =

Fourteenth season of the French reality TV series Secret Story.

Secret Story
- Season 14
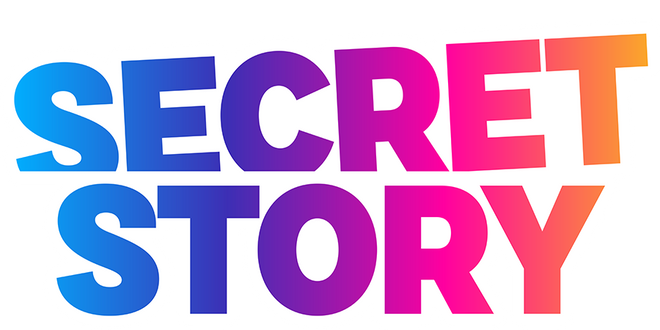
- Hosted by: Christophe Beaugrand
- No. of days: 59
- No. of housemates: 14
- Winner: Paola Cavalli
- Runner-up: Océane Andrieu
- No. of episodes: 59

Release
- Original network: TF1 (launch show); TMC (daily and live shows); TFX (rebroadcast); TF1+ (live stream)
- Original release: 23 June – 20 August 2026

Season chronology
- ← Previous; Season 13

Secret Story 14 is the fourteenth season of the French reality television series Secret Story, based loosely on the international Big Brother format. The season premiered on 23 June 2026 and was again hosted by Christophe Beaugrand.

The season began with the launch show, which aired on TF1. Daily episodes and weekly prime-time live shows aired on TMC, following the show's move from TFX in the thirteenth season. The daily episodes were also rebroadcast on TFX every evening. TF1+ Premium also offered live connections with the House of Secrets every day during the afternoon, from 2 pm to 4 pm and in the evening 9 pm to 11 pm.

The season concluded on 20 August 2026 with Paola Cavalli announced as the winner and received the €100,000 prize.

== Housemates ==
Thirteen housemates entered the house on Day 1, while Kurtis entered on Day 9, following Lou's eviction.

Name	Age on entry	Residence	Occupation	Day entered	Day exited	Status
Paola Cavalli	25	Boulogne-Billancourt	Communications student	1	59	Winner
Océane Andrieu	27	Perpignan	Fitness instructor	1	59	Runner-up
Robin Rainero	24	Nice	Clothing brand owner	1	59	Third place
Kurtis Yedo	24	Alfortville	Real estate agent	9	59	Fourth place
Maguette Diouf	21	Marseille	Luxury event communications	1	52	Evicted
Gréta Zézé	26	Val-de-Reuil	Athlete	1	52	Evicted
Malo Boutry	26	Rueil-Malmaison	Landscaping business owner	1	52	Evicted
Arthur Garcia	26	Perpignan	Graphic designer	1	45	Evicted
Léonie Mérida	24	Paris	Editorial and social media manager	1	38	Evicted
Azad Feddal	28	Bordeaux	Business developer	1	31	Evicted
Simon Vigne	25	Saint-Rémy-de-Provence	Bar manager	1	31	Evicted
Arwen Caharel-Delphin	22	Paris	Communications student	1	24	Evicted
Willy Gorrissen Ruiz	27	Marbella, Spain	Boat rental company owner	1	16	Evicted
Lou Hébrard	27	Toulouse	Avatar creator	1	9	Evicted

== Secrets ==
Name	Secret	Discovered by...	Discovered on...	Ref(s)
Arwen	"I was born with only one kidney"	Undiscovered (Note: This housemate(s) was evicted before their secret was discovered.)		
Arthur and Océane (Note: Arthur and Océane shared the same secret.)	"We are a couple"	Gréta	Day 38	
Azad	"Following an accident, I came close to death"	Undiscovered		
Gréta	"I am the Oracle of the House of Secrets"	Océane	Day 50	
Kurtis	"My face has been broadcast in more than 215 countries"	Océane & Robin	Day 52	
Léonie	"I am a descendant of Louis XV"	Paola	Day 24	
Lou	"I am the creator of the Avatars"	Undiscovered		
Maguette	"My father is a football legend"	Malo half	Day 52	
Malo	"One of my stories became a worldwide advertisement"	Maguette - 1/2	Day 41 (Note: Maguette buzzed Malo for the first time on Day 41: "I made a video which was widely viewed worldwide", before finding the entirety of his secret on Day 50.)	
Malo	"One of my stories became a worldwide advertisement"	Maguette - 1/2	Day 50	
Paola	"I am the protector of the couple"	Maguette	Day 52	
Robin	"At 6 years old, I was a young musical prodigy"	Kurtis - 1/2 (Note: Kurtis buzzed Robin: "I am a musical genius.")	Day 52	
Simon	"I shared the pool with one of the greatest Olympic champions"	Arthur - 1/2 (Note: Arthur buzzed Simon: "I am a swimming champion.")	Day 30	
Willy	"I live with a bullet in my head"	Undiscovered (Note: Willy revealed his secret after being evicted from the house on Day 16.)		

== Nominations table ==
This housemate was in the Yacht of Secrets.
This housemate was immune for that round of nominations.
This housemate was directly nominated or nominated as a consequence of failing a certain task/mission.
This housemate was Master of Votes and received control over the nomination process.
This housemate secured a finalist position.
Red ⊙ This housemate received a special power and gave nomination votes to another housemate; Red ⊃ This housemate received the votes and was allowed to transfer to another housemate; Red ⊂ This housemate received the transferred votes.
x2/x3 This housemate's nomination vote counted twice or three times.

	Week 1	Week 2	Week 3	Week 4		Week 5	Week 6	Week 7	Week 8 Final	
	Week 1	Week 2	Week 3	Day 28 Cursed Attic twist	Day 31 Express vote	Week 5	Week 6	Week 7	Week 8 Final	
Paola	Nominated	Not; Eligible	Arwen & Kurtis; Océane & Robin	Maguette	Arthur	In the Yacht	⊃ Malo x3	Kurtis to be finalist	Winner (Day 59)	
Paola	Nominated	Not; Eligible	Arwen & Kurtis; Océane & Robin	Maguette	Arthur	In the Yacht	Gréta; Robin	Kurtis to be finalist	Winner (Day 59)	
Océane	Lou to identify	Not; Eligible	Gréta & Simon	Léonie	Not; Eligible	Paola	Malo; Gréta	~~Robin~~; Kurtis to be finalist	Runner-Up (Day 59)	
Robin	Malo to identify	Arwen	Gréta & Simon	Paola	Not; Eligible	Arthur	⊙ ~~Paola x3~~ Arthur x2	Kurtis to be finalist	Third Place (Day 59)	
Robin	Malo to identify	Arwen	Gréta & Simon	Paola	Not; Eligible	Arthur	Arthur; Océane	Kurtis to be finalist	Third Place (Day 59)	
Kurtis	Not in House	Arwen	Océane & Robin	Paola	Nominated	In the Yacht	Arthur; Océane	Gréta to be finalist	Fourth Place (Day 59)	
Gréta	Not; Eligible	Azad; Robin	Océane & Robin	Léonie	Not; Eligible	Arthur	Arthur; Océane	Maguette to be finalist	Evicted (Day 52)	
Maguette	Failed to identify	Not; Eligible	Océane & Robin	Paola	Azad	Léonie; Léonie	Banned	Gréta to be finalist	Evicted (Day 52)	
Maguette	Failed to identify	Not; Eligible	Océane & Robin	Paola	Azad	Arthur	Malo x3	Gréta to be finalist	Evicted (Day 52)	
Malo	Nominated	Azad; Océane	Arwen & Kurtis; Océane & Robin	Léonie	Not; Eligible	Paola	⊂ x3 Arthur; Océane	Not; Eligible	Evicted (Day 52)	
Arthur	Immuned	Azad; Robin	Gréta & Simon	Léonie	Kurtis	Paola	Gréta; Robin	Evicted (Day 45)		
Léonie	Paola to identify	Arthur x2 Willy x2	Océane & Robin	Simon	Not; Eligible	Paola	Evicted (Day 38)			
Azad	Simon to identify	Arthur x3 Willy x3	Gréta & Simon	Paola	Kurtis	Evicted (Day 31)				
Simon	Nominated	Not; Eligible	Océane & Robin	Léonie	Evicted (Day 31)					
Arwen	Not; Eligible	Nominated	Océane & Robin	Evicted (Day 24)						
Willy	Not; Eligible	Not; Eligible	Evicted (Day 16)							
Lou	Nominated	Evicted (Day 9)								
Penalty	none		Océane & Robin	none						
Notes	1	2	3	4	5	6	7	8	9	
Up for eviction	Lou; Maguette; Malo; Paola; Simon	Arthur; Arwen; Azad; Willy	Arwen; Greta; Kurtis; Océane; Robin; Simon	Léonie; Maguette; Malo; Simon	Arthur; Azad; Kurtis	Arthur; Léonie; Paola	Arthur; Greta; Kurtis; Malo; Océane; Paola	Greta; Maguette; Malo; Océane; Paola	Kurtis; Océane; Paola; Robin	
Evicted	Lou; Fewest votes to save	Willy; Fewest votes to save	Arwen; Fewest votes to save	Simon; Fewest votes to save	Azad; Fewest votes to save	Léonie; Fewest votes to save	Arthur; Fewest votes to save	Malo; Fewest votes (out of 5) to save	Kurtis; 9% to win	Robin; 17% to win
Evicted	Lou; Fewest votes to save	Willy; Fewest votes to save	Arwen; Fewest votes to save	Simon; Fewest votes to save	Azad; Fewest votes to save	Léonie; Fewest votes to save	Arthur; Fewest votes to save	Gréta; Fewest votes (out of 4) to save	Océane; 32% to win	
Evicted	Lou; Fewest votes to save	Willy; Fewest votes to save	Arwen; Fewest votes to save	Simon; Fewest votes to save	Azad; Fewest votes to save	Léonie; Fewest votes to save	Arthur; Fewest votes to save	Maguette; Fewest votes (out of 4) to save	Paola; 42% to win	

Notes

- ^Note 1: At the start of the season, the 13 housemates were divided into two groups. Arwen, Malo, Lou, Gréta, Arthur, Simon, Paola and Willy entered the House of Secrets (main house), while Maguette, Azad, Océane, Léonie and Robin were sent to the Yacht of Secrets. The two groups initially lived separately and didn't know each other's identities. During the first week, the eight housemates in the main house created avatars, while the five Yacht housemates acted as investigators, attempting to identify the real housemates from a selection of 16 avatars. The outcome of the investigation determined the first nominees. Correctly identifying a real housemate resulted in that housemate being nominated, while the investigator received immunity. Incorrectly identifying a fictional avatar resulted in the investigator being nominated. Léonie and Océane received immunity for identified Paola and Lou, respectively, while Maguette was nominated after incorrectly identifying a fictional avatar assigned to Arthur, resulting in Arthur being granted immunity. Robin correctly identified Malo's avatar, while Azad identified Simon's.
- ^Note 2: Kurtis was appointed Maître des votes (Master of votes) and given control over the nomination process. He granted nomination rights to Greta, Arthur and Malo, and Léonie received a double nomination vote and Azad a triple nomination vote. Greta nominated Robin and Azad, Arthur nominated Azad and Robin, and Malo nominated Azad and Océane. Léonie and Azad both nominated Arthur and Willy, with their votes respectively counting double (x2) and triple (x3). Kurtis and Robin directly nominated Arwen. The four nominees were Arthur, Arwen, Azad and Willy
- ^Note 3: For the Cercle de confiance (Circle of Trust) twist, the housemates were divided into pairs. Each pair shared the same fate in nomination. The pair Paola & Malo were given the power to nominate one pair directly and chose Arwen & Kurtis. The remaining pairs nominated another pair through a nomination process in the Confessional. During the previous week's live show, Océane was given the power to impose a penalty vote and chose Azad & Robin. After the pairs were reshuffled, Robin teamed up with Océane, and the penalty vote carried over to their new pair. The two pairs receiving the most votes were Océane and Robin and Greta and Simon. The six housemates were then put up for the public vote individually, rather than in pairs.
- ^Note 4: Malo was automatically nominated as a consequence of Greta's decision during the previous live show on Day 24. Her choice to secure immunity for the following week resulted in both Arwen and Malo being nominated. As Arwen was evicted later during the live show on Day 24, Malo was the only one of the two who remained in the game. Meanwhile, Kurtis, who was secretly staying in the Grenier Maudit (Cursed Attic), was given the power to send two housemates into the Attic and he selected Paola and Azad. The other housemates were then asked to choose one of the two to be replaced. They voted for Léonie to take Azad's place, leaving Paola and Léonie in the Attic. Then a vote was held to determine which of the two would be nominated, with Léonie receiving five votes against Paola's four. Léonie was therefore nominated and allowed to leave the Attic, but had to choose a housemate to replace her, she selected Simon. Paola was also replaced by Maguette. As the final housemates in the Attic, Simon and Maguette were automatically nominated alongside Léonie. Therefore, Malo, Léonie, Simon and Maguette were the four nominees.
- ^Note 5: After Simon's eviction, a second nomination round was triggered by the Pont des Sacrifices (Bridge of Sacrifices), a challenge in which housemates made choices that affected their fellow housemates. Maguette and Paola each had to nominate one housemate and grant immunity to another. Maguette chose to nominate Azad and granted immunity to Paola, while Paola chose to nominate Arthur and granted immunity to Maguette. Arthur and Azad were called by Téléphone rouge (Red Telephone) to the bridge and informed that they were nominated. They were then sent to the SAS (the secret waiting room), where they were given the task of choosing a third nominee. They chose Kurtis, and the three housemates immediately faced a five-minute public vote. Kurtis and Arthur were saved, while Azad received the fewest votes and was evicted.
- ^Note 6: During the previous week's Bridge of Sacrifices, Maguette agreed to nominate Léonie (in red) in the following week. On Day 36, after crossing the red line in the Zone Rouge (Red Zone), she received another vote to nominate a housemate of her choice and again chose Léonie (in blue), giving her two additional votes against her that week. On Day 35, the Red Telephone sent Kurtis, Paola, Léonie and Arthur to the Yacht, separating them from the other housemates. The following day, Océane, jealous of Arthur and Paola's growing closeness, spent €5,000 from the prize fund to join them. After her arrival, she and Paola received the power to select the first nominee of the week and they chose Léonie. The remaining nominations were determined through separate votes by the two groups. In the main house, Océane and Malo voted for Paola, while Maguette, Greta and Robin voted for Arthur, making Arthur the main house's nominee. The Yacht housemates voted separately and selected Paola as the second nominee. The three nominees were therefore Arthur, Léonie and Paola. Léonie was evicted.
- ^Note 7: Paola was automatically nominated for the remainder of the season (nomination à vie: lifetime nomination) after her role in protecting Arthur and Océane's secret relationship was exposed. During the week, Robin introduced the Caverne des Malédictions (Cave of Curses) with Paola, Arthur and Maguette, where he was given the power to triple the votes against Paola (x3), double those against Arthur (x2) and prevent Maguette from nominating in this round of housemates' nominations. ⊃ Paola later received an opportunity to transfer the three votes on her to a housemate of her choice. She chose ⊂ Malo. As a consequence, he received the additional three votes. Maguette received a secret mission with a €10,000 reward: she had to make the other housemates dislike her. As part of the mission, she faced Paola in the Cave of Curses, where the first to press a black buzzer would gain immunity for the week. Paola stepped aside, letting Maguette press it and gain immunity. Later, the Red Telephone announced the reopening of the Cursed Attic and granted Maguette the opportunity to take one housemate there and give three additional votes (x3) against a housemate of her choice. She chose Malo. Following the housemates' nomination votes and these additional powers, Arthur, Greta, Kurtis, Malo, Océane and Paola faced the public vote.
- ^Note 8: During the live show on Day 45, Robin was called to the SAS and instructed by La Voix to give a black envelope to a housemate of his choice. He chose Océane, who was not allowed to open it immediately. During the same live show, Paola was given a choice between allowing either Gréta or Océane to meet a relative in the SAS, with the other inheriting her (Paola) lifetime nomination. Paola chose Gréta, who was reunited with her sister, while Océane inherited the lifetime nomination. Following Arthur's eviction, Océane was allowed to open the black envelope and discovered that it contained a special nomination power. The following day, she used this power to nominate Robin. On Day 49, Robin won a treasure hunt organised by La Voix, solved the code to unlock the main house and got a golden ticket that secured him the first finalist spot. He later gave a free buzz to Océane, who used it to successfully discover Gréta's secret. The following day, the housemates voted to select a second finalist. Malo sacrificed his voting right in exchange for an additional clue about a housemate's secret and a free buzz. As a consequence, he did not participate in the vote. Kurtis received three votes, ahead of Gréta with two and Maguette with one, securing him the second finalist spot. The remaining five housemates, Paola, Océane, Gréta, Malo and Maguette, were automatically nominated for the semi-final. During the live show on Day 52, the five nominees entered the SAS in two rounds, with the public votes carried over between them. Malo was evicted in the first round after receiving the fewest votes. In the second round, Océane and Paola secured the remaining places in the final, while Gréta and Maguette were evicted.
- ^Note 9: For the final week, the public voted for the winner.
