= Secret Story (French TV series) =

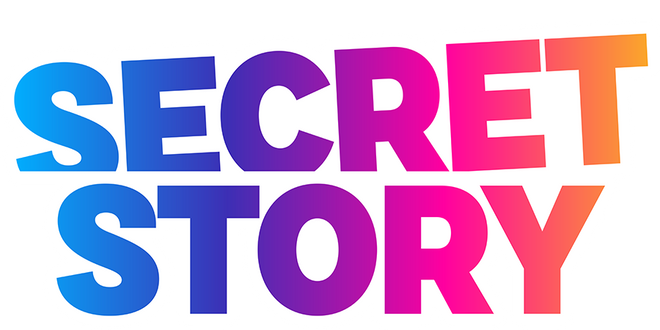
- 2024 revival logo
- Genre: Reality competition
- Presented by: Benjamin Castaldi (S1–8) (Note: During the third and sixth seasons, Nikos Aliagas replaced Benjamin Castaldi for certains shows due to a sick leave.); Adrien Lemaître (After shows, S3–8); Christophe Beaugrand (S9–present)
- Voices of: Dominique Duforest (as La Voix); Zoé Bettan (as La Fausse Voix, S12)
- Narrated by: Emily Forest (S2–present); Caroline Klaus (S7)
- Opening theme: I Wanna Chat by Booty Full (Note: Since season 12, a version of the song with altered lyrics, titled I Wanna Chat (version 2024), is used.)
- Ending theme: I Wanna Chat (Instrumental)
- Country of origin: France
- Original language: French
- No. of seasons: 14
- No. of episodes: 158 (live shows, 2007–25); 1011 (daily shows, 2007–25)

Production
- Production locations: Studio 224 (Seine-Saint-Denis) (house, S1–7); Studio 1000 de la Montjoie (Seine-Saint-Denis) (house, S8–11); Studio 217 (Seine-Saint-Denis) (shows, S1–11); Technoparc (Poissy) (house and shows, S12–present)
- Camera setup: Multiple
- Production companies: Endemol France; So Nice Productions (S1–4); 2M Productions (S1)

Original release
- Network: TF1
- Release: 23 June 2007 – 26 September 2014
- Network: TF1 (Live shows, S9; Premiere live shows, S10–11); NT1 (Daily and after shows, S9; All shows, S10–11)
- Release: 21 August 2015 – 7 December 2017
- Network: TF1 (Live and daily shows, S12; Premiere live show, S13); TFX (After shows, S12; All shows, S13) (Note: For season 12, the first after show was broadcast on TF1+. It was moved to TFX from the second after show onwards.)
- Release: 23 April 2024 – 7 August 2025
- Network: TF1 (Premiere live show); TMC
- Release: 23 June 2026 – present

Secret Story is a French reality competition television show. Despite not being a direct adaptation of the Big Brother franchise's format, created by producer John de Mol Jr. in 1997, the show has a similar concept while including its own game mechanics, and is also produced and owned by Big Brother's production company Endemol Shine Group/Banijay Entertainment.

It follows a group of contestants who live together in a specially constructed house named La maison des secrets (The House of Secrets) that is isolated from the outside world for a cash prize. The contestants are continuously monitored during their stay in the house by live television cameras as well as personal audio microphones. Throughout the course of the competition, contestants are evicted from the house, by being voted out of the competition by the spectators after being nominated by the other residents. All contestants have a secret that they try to hide, while trying to discover the other housemates' one. Finding a secret allows the candidates to add money to their prize pool, while the candidate whose secret was discovered loses money. Several challenges and secret missions are also offered to the candidates during the adventure to help them earn money or clues.

The show was hosted by Benjamin Castaldi for the first eight seasons, and by Christophe Beaugrand since the ninth season.

Each seasons begins with an inaugural live show airing in the evening, and are composed of daily shows that airs during the afternoon (except on Saturdays or Sundays depending on the seasons). It also feature weekly live shows to reveal the evicted member of the week or the winner for the final one, that aired either on Friday or Thursday evening depending on the season (with the exception of the twelfth season where only the inaugural and final shows aired in the evening, and with the eviction live shows replaced by a live daily show on Friday afternoon). Each live shows also offers contestants different challenges, confrontations, and events that can have an impact on the game. From the third to twelfth seasons, the live shows where followed by an after show titled After Secret, (Note: The after show was titled After Secret from seasons 3 to 9, and 12. It was retitled Le Débrief for seasons 10 and 11.) co-hosted by Castaldi and Adrien Lemaître from seasons three to eight, and Beaugrand from the ninth.

Secret Story premiered on 23 June 2007 on TF1. For the ninth season, the daily and after shows moved to NT1 while the live shows where still airing on TF1. Following a ratings declined, the tenth and eleventh seasons where moved completely to NT1, with TF1 only airing the first live show of each seasons. In May 2018, the show was canceled after eleven seasons. In October 2023, the TF1 Group announced that the show will be revived in 2024. The revival premiered on 23 April 2024 on TF1, with the after shows on TFX. The revival version was later moved to TFX for the thirteenth season, and to TMC for the fourteenth season, with TF1 only airing the first live show of each seasons.

Secret Story has spanned a franchise with numerous international adaptations including Portuguese, Dutch, Peruvian, Lithuanian, Spanish, and French-African versions. Some of his game mechanics were also used in selected seasons of the Big Brother franchise internationally.

== Series overall ==
Seasons	Start date	Finale date	Days	Housemates	Winner	Percentage	Main presenter	Grand prize	Network	Average ratings	Ratings share
Secret Story 1	23 June 2007	31 August 2007	69	15	Marjorie, Cyrielle & Johanna Bluteau	42%	Benjamin Castaldi	€178,000	TF1	4,838,467	34.60%
Secret Story 2	27 June 2008	5 September 2008	71	16	Matthias Pohl	33%	Benjamin Castaldi	€181,151	TF1	4,220,676	31.80%
Secret Story 3	19 June 2009	25 September 2009	99	20	Emilie Nefnaf	39%	Benjamin Castaldi	€186,000	TF1	3,945,400	30.30%
Secret Story 4	9 July 2010	22 October 2010	108	20	Benoît Dubois	32%	Benjamin Castaldi	€197,805	TF1	3,006,688	24.80%
Secret Story 5	8 July 2011	14 October 2011	99	19	Marie Garet	45%	Benjamin Castaldi	€186,367	TF1	2,815,333	24.20%
Secret Story 6	25 May 2012	7 September 2012	106	20	Nadège Lacroix	73%	Benjamin Castaldi	€165,140	TF1	2,172,688	21%
Secret Story 7	7 June 2013	13 September 2013	101	17	Anaïs Camizuli	52%	Benjamin Castaldi	€174,630	TF1	2,014,467	21.90%
Secret Story 8	18 July 2014	26 September 2014	71	15	Leila Ben Khalifa	51%	Benjamin Castaldi	€114,300	TF1	1,938,091	21%
Secret Story 9	21 August 2015	13 November 2015	85	16	Émilie Fiorelli	51%	Christophe Beaugrand	€108,028	TF1 (live shows) NT1 (daily shows and After Secret)	1,143,750	17.50%
Secret Story 10	26 August 2016	17 November 2016	84	16	Julien Geloën	42%	Christophe Beaugrand	€111,400	NT1 (Note: For seasons 10-11 and 13-14, TF1 only aired the inaugural live show.)	743,846	4.7%
Secret Story 11	1 September 2017	7 December 2017	98	17	Noré Tir	41.6%	Christophe Beaugrand	€115,866	NT1	565,533	3.2%
Secret Story 12	23 April 2024	18 June 2024	56	15	Alexis André Jr.	49%	Christophe Beaugrand	€105,313	TF1 TFX (After Secret)	870,100	11.6 %
Secret Story 13	10 June 2025	7 August 2025	60	14	Romy Loyez	72%	Christophe Beaugrand	€105,000	TFX	514,110	5.2%
Secret Story 14	23 June 2026	20 August 2026	60	14	Paola Cavalli	42%	Christophe Beaugrand	€100,000	TMC	415,000	4,3%

== Concept ==
=== The house of secrets ===
At the beginning of each season, the "house of secrets" also contains hidden rooms. It contains for example a "Chamber of truths" in the first season (room accessible by pressing a button hidden in the tapestry), a "Cave of love" in the second season (room accessible by a passage in the pool), or "a house of intruders" in the third season (room accessible by a secret passage on the floor). Some "Secret rooms" are also set up for each season where two contestants announced as eliminated to the other candidates have to remain locked up in order to see all their comings and goings through television screens.

Other rooms are inspired by Big Brother, as the "confessional" where each contestant goes every day to give his impression or opinion on events that happen in the house to "The Voice", or a double-door entrance, an intermediary passage between the house and outside, where "nominated" (contestants who have been chosen to leave the house by the others) learn their elimination or reintegration in the house where some contestants can come into contact with other candidates who have already been eliminated through a glass pane.

=== The Voice ===
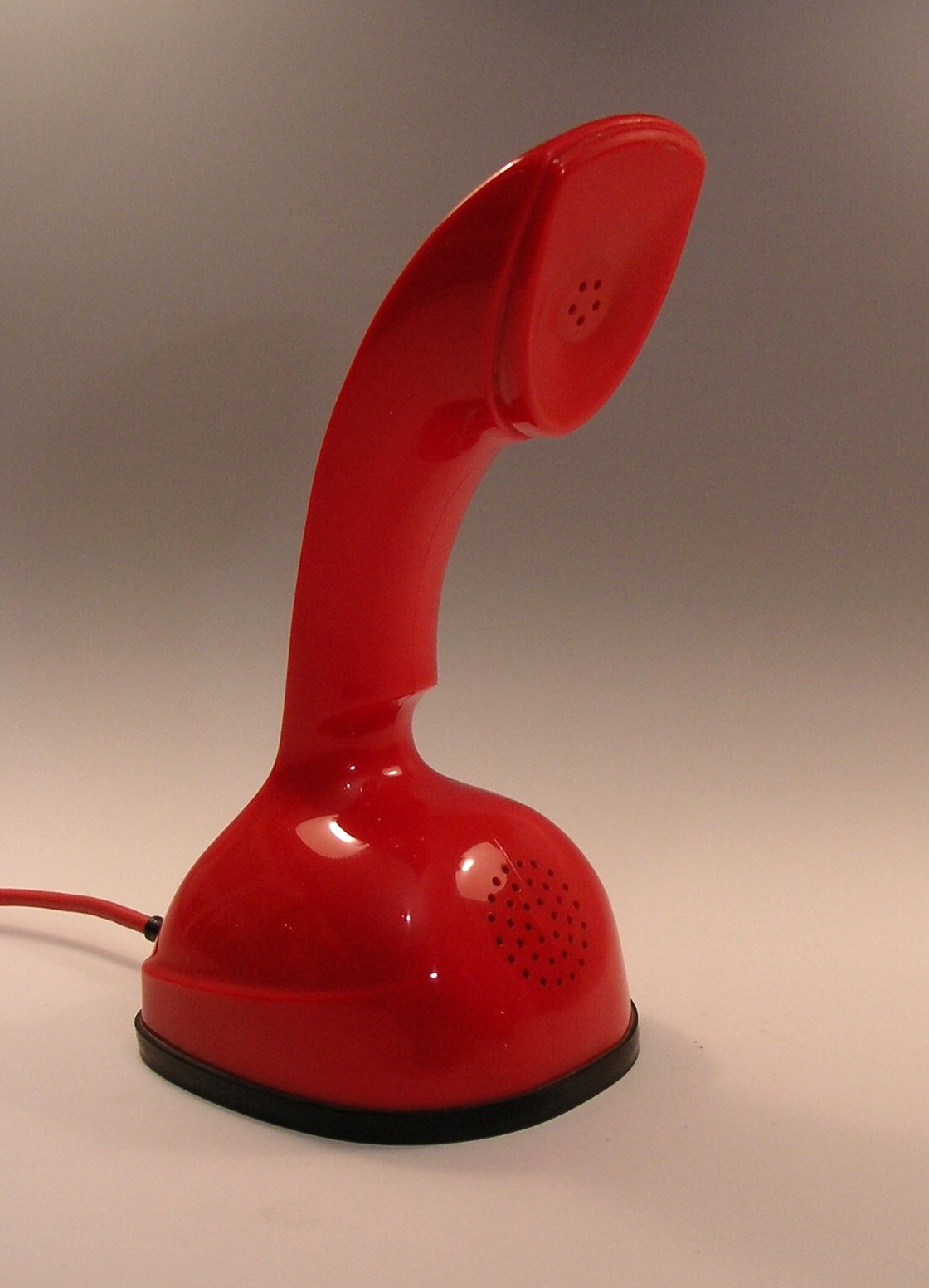
An Ericofon, a red telephone used during seasons 2 and 6.

An invisible male character named "The Voice" (La Voix) can speak at any time to the contestants through the speakers and give them instructions. This is the voice of the radio host Dominique Duforest. "The Voice" always starts its interventions with the sentence "This is the Voice" and ends with "That is all … for now".

At the beginning of the game, "The Voice" imposes some rules that the contestants have to obey during the whole game if they don't want to be penalized (no more warm water, withdrawal of a contestant's kitty bank for example). During the game, a "red phone" makes its appearance from which "The Voice" can get the contestants that answer win or lose money, give a resident one more vote against him for nominations, or allow a contestant to "nominate automatically" another one.

"The Voice" also has the ability to propose an emotional or entertaining "secret mission" to one or several contestants of its choice, allowing him or them to win money without the knowledge of other contestants. Activities and parties are also organized by "The Voice" in order to break contestants' everyday life, but also to replenish their kitty bank.

=== Secrets ===
The characteristic of Secret Story is the fact that each contestant must hide a secret that relates to them to protect their kitty bank initially filled up with 10 000 euros. The secrets of the contestants are usually personal as "I decided to change sex", "I survived a tsunami" or "I have Einstein's IQ", but they can also be changed or imposed by the production as "We are a false couple" or "We are the intruders of the house".

The contestant who thinks he guessed the secret of another one can "buzz" the latter, that is to say setting off a kind of sound alarm located in the confessional. Then there is a "confrontation" between the two contestants in private and in the presence of "the Voice" where the defendant has to justify himself without revealing his secret. The discoverer can confirm its "buzz" by investing a part of its kitty bank (the sum set by "the Voice" is 5000 euros). In this case, the answer is given later in front of the other contestants. If he guessed right, he wins the whole defendant's kitty bank; otherwise, he lets him having the total of the "buzz" (excepted in case of free "buzz" offered previously by "the Voice" or by the public and/or the Internet users who vote for the election of the best investigator of the week).

== Franchise ==
=== International versions ===
Region/Country	Local title	Seasons	Originally aired	Network
Portugal	Secret Story – Casa dos Segredos	18 (Total) 10 (Main) 8 (All-Stars)	2010–present	TVI
Netherlands	Secret Story	1	2011	Net5
Peru	La Casa de los Secretos	1	2012	Frecuencia Latina
Lithuania	Paslapčių namai	1	2013	TV3/TV6/TV8
Spain	Secret Story: La Casa de los Secretos	2	2021–2022	Telecinco
Francophone Africa	Secret Story Afrique	2	2024–present	Canal+ Pop

- Some contestants participated in several versions of the show:
  - Daniela Martins from the third season of the original French version, returned for the first season of the Portuguese version with a different secret.
  - Fanny Rodrigues from the second season of the Portuguese version, returned for the tenth season of the original French version, with a secret link to the fact that she already participate to Secret Story. She was also a contestant in two all-stars editions in Portugal, becoming the contestant with the most participation in the franchise.
  - Sarah Lopez from the tenth season of the original French version, made an appearance in a live show of the second season of the Spanish version.

=== Video game ===
An official video game adaptation of the show was released for the Nintendo DS on 17 September 2009 in France. The game was developed and published by Anuman Interactive.

=== Secret Story mechanics in Big Brother ===
Both the Secret Story and the Big Brother franchises are owned by Endemol Shine Group/Banijay Entertainment. In 2010, the company started to add some of the game mechanics from Secret Story, mainly the concept of secrets, in selected seasons of Big Brother internationally.

Region/Country	Show	Season	Originally aired	Network
South Africa	Big Brother Africa	Big Brother Africa: All-Stars	2010	M-Net
Germany	Big Brother	Big Brother: The Secret	2011	RTL Zwei
Australia	Big Brother Australia	Season 9	2012	Nine Network
Albania	Big Brother Albania	Season 6	2013	Top Channel
United Kingdom	Big Brother	Big Brother: Secrets and Lies	2013	Channel 5
Denmark	Big Brother	Big Brother : Hemmeligheder & Løgne	2014	Kanal 5
South Africa	Big Brother Mzansi	Big Brother Mzansi: Secrets	2014	Mzansi Magic
Spain	Gran Hermano	Season 16	2015	Telecinco
