= Secret Story =

Secret Story may refer to:

== Books ==
- Secret Story, a novel by Ramsey Campbell 2006
- The Secret Story, a novel by Cathy Hopkins 2009

== Music ==
- Secret Story (album), a 1992 album by Pat Metheny
- Secret Story, music documentary introducing Secret (South Korean band)

== Television ==
- Secret Story (French TV series)
- Secret Story (Portuguese TV series)
- Secret Story (Spanish TV series)
- Secret Story 2011 (Netherlands)
- Secret Story (Peruvian TV series)
- Secret Story (Lithuanian TV series)
- Secret Story (African TV series)

== See also ==
- Big Brother (TV series)
