= Secret Story season 1 =

Secret Story (season 1) or Secret Story 1 is the first season of various versions of television show Secret Story and may refer to:

- Secret Story (French season 1), the 2007 edition of the French version.
- Secret Story 1 (Portugal), the 2010 edition of the Portuguese version.
- Secret Story (Dutch TV series), the 2011 edition of the Dutch version.
- La casa de los secretos, the 2012 edition of the Peruvian version.
- Paslapčių namai, the 2013 edition of the Lithuanian version.
