= Secret Story (Lithuanian TV series) =

Paslapčių namai
- Presented by: Marijonas Mikutavičius; Agnė Grigaliūnienė
- No. of days: 85
- No. of housemates: 15
- Winner: Gintautas Katulis
- Runner-up: Karolina Riaukaitė

Release
- Original network: TV3; TV6; TV8
- Original release: 2 March – 25 May 2013

Paslapčių namai (lit. The House of Secrets) is a Lithuanian reality competition television show based on the French series Secret Story and part of the franchise of the same name.

Like the original French version, the show is not a direct adaptation of the Big Brother franchise's format, created by producer John de Mol Jr. in 1997, but has a similar concept while including his own game mechanics and is also produced and owned by Big Brother's production company Endemol Shine Group/Banijay Entertainment. It started on March 2, 2013, on TV3, TV6 and TV8.

== Housemates ==
- Andrius Braziulis is a 30-year-old IT scientist.
- Avgustina Issengel is a 20-year-old model and a dancer. Her father is from Brazil and her mother is from Belarus.
- Dileta Meškaitė is a 22-year-old singer.
- Elita Vilpišauskaitė is a 26-year-old homemaker.
- Ernestas Naučius is a 30-year-old father of two daughters.
- Gintautas Katulis is a 22-year-old psychology and theater student.
- Indrė Vožbutaitė is a 26-year-old, factory worker in the United Kingdom.
- Jolita Grubliauskaitė is a 29-year-old lawyer.
- Karolina Riaukaitė is a 23-year-old radio host.
- Laura Kuliešaitė is a 24-year-old law student and a model from Vilnius.
- Šarūnas Tamulis is a 24-year-old actor.
- Tomas Patašius is a 23-year-old, unemployed.
- Valdas Končius is a 24-year-old from Šiauliai. He has 8 brothers and sisters.
- Viktorija Česonytė is a 35-year-old psychologist and a business woman.
- Vytautas Kugelevičius is a 20-year-old who wants to work in TV.

== Secrets ==
| Secret | Person | Discovered by | Discovered on: |
|---|---|---|---|
| My ex-boyfriend was an escort. | Elita | Not Discovered | Revealed on Day 8 |
| My wife is my first and only woman in my life. | Ernestas | Jolita | Day 18 |
| My fiancé is Japanese | Indrė | Not Discovered | Revealed on Day 22 |
| I was engaged to a stripper. | Andrius | Viktorija | Day 26 |
| I was a suspect of murdering my father. | Viktorija | Not Discovered | Revealed on Day 29 |
| I lived in a nunnery against my will. | Dileta | Jolita | Day 40 |
| I broke the speed record in double bike racing. | Jolita | Karolina | Day 46 |
| I was left during engagement. | Tomas | Laura | Day 56 |
| My tattoo is for my grandfather remembrance. | Vytautas | Not Discovered | Revealed on Day 57 |
| I am addicted to computer games. | Gintautas | Karolina | Day 59 |
| My grandfather was the mayor of Lentvaris. | Avgustina | Šarūnas | Day 67 |
| I lived with Radži for 3 years. | Valdas | Not Discovered | Revealed on Day 78 |
| I lied about my graduation from university. | Šarūnas | Laura | Day 81 |
| I worked on farm. | Laura | Šarūnas | Day 83 |
| I am a teenage mom. | Karolina | Šarūnas | Day 84 |

== Nominations table ==
| | Week 1 | Week 2 | Week 3 | Week 4 | Week 5 | Week 6 | Week 7 | Week 8 | Week 9 | Week 10 | Week 11 | Week 12 | | Nominations received |
|---|---|---|---|---|---|---|---|---|---|---|---|---|---|---|
| Gintautas | Elita; Viktorija | Not; Eligible | Viktorija (x2); Indrė (x2) | Jolita; Viktorija | Not; Eligible | Jolita; Dileta | Jolita; Dileta | ~~Šarūnas~~; ~~Tomas~~ | Karolina; Valdas | No; Nominations | Avgustina; Karolina; Avgustina | Winner (Day 85) | | 21 |
| Karolina | Not; Eligible | Tomas; Ernestas | Not; Eligible | Andrius; Šarūnas | Vytautas; Valdas | Not; Eligible | Šarūnas; Valdas | ~~Šarūnas~~; ~~Gintautas~~ | Šarūnas; Jolita | No; Nominations | Valdas; Gintautas; Avgustina | Runner-Up (Day 85) | | 13 |
| Šarūnas | Viktorija; Indrė | Not; Eligible | Dileta; Karolina | Dileta; Jolita | Not; Eligible | Dileta; Jolita | Dileta; Avgustina | ~~Gintautas~~; ~~Valdas~~ | Gintautas; Karolina | No; Nominations | Laura; Karolina; Karolina | Third place (Day 85) | | 15 |
| Laura | Not; Eligible | Tomas; Andrius | Not; Eligible | Šarūnas; Valdas | Andrius; Vytautas | Not; Eligible | Tomas; Valdas | ~~Šarūnas~~; ~~Tomas~~ | Gintautas; Jolita | Nominated | Valdas; Šarūnas; Karolina | Fourth place (Day 85) | | 6 |
| Avgustina | Not; Eligible | Gintautas; Tomas | Not; Eligible | Tomas; Gintautas | Gintautas; Andrius | Not; Eligible | Gintautas; Šarūnas | ~~Šarūnas~~; ~~Gintautas~~ | Gintautas; Karolina | No; Nominations | Valdas; Gintautas; Laura | Evicted (Day 78) | | 10 |
| Valdas | Karolina; Laura | Not; Eligible | Viktorija; Jolita | Viktorija; Jolita | Not; Eligible | Jolita; Laura | Jolita; Karolina | ~~Šarūnas~~; ~~Tomas~~ | Jolita; Karolina | No; Nominations | Avgustina; Laura; Avgustina | Evicted (Day 78) | | 11 |
| Tomas | Karolina; Indrė | Not; Eligible | Indrė; Avgustina | Avgustina; Karolina | Not; Eligible | Dileta; Avgustina | Jolita; Dileta | ~~Valdas~~; ~~Gintautas~~ | Karolina; Valdas | Nominated | Evicted (Day 71) | | | 12 |
| Jolita | Not; Eligible | Šarūnas; Gintautas | Not; Eligible | Gintautas; Šarūnas | Gintautas; Šarūnas | Not; Eligible | Gintautas; Tomas | ~~Šarūnas~~; ~~Gintautas~~ | Karolina; Avgustina | Evicted (Day 64) | | | | 17 |
| Vytautas | Elita; Jolita | Not; Eligible | Viktorija; Dileta | Viktorija; Dileta | Not; Eligible | Dileta; Jolita | Dileta; Jolita | ~~Valdas~~; ~~Tomas~~ | Evicted (Day 57) | | | | | 3 |
| Dileta | Not; Eligible | —N/a | Not; Eligible | Tomas; Gintautas | Andrius; Tomas | Not; Eligible | Gintautas; Vytautas | Evicted (Day 50) | | | | | | 13 |
| Andrius | Viktorija; Elita | Not; Eligible | Viktorija; Jolita | Viktorija; Dileta | Not; Eligible | Evicted (Day 36) | | | | | | | | 7 |
| Viktorija | Not; Eligible | Ernestas; Andrius | Not; Eligible | Andrius; Gintautas | Evicted (Day 29) | | | | | | | | | 13 |
| Indrė | Not; Eligible | —N/a | Not; Eligible | Evicted (Day 22) | | | | | | | | | | 5 |
| Ernestas | Viktorija; Laura | Not; Eligible | Evicted (Day 15) | | | | | | | | | | | 2 |
| Elita | Not; Eligible | Evicted (Day 8) | | | | | | | | | | | | 3 |
| Notes | none | 1 | 2 | 3 | none | 4 | 3 | 5, 6 | 7 | 8 | 9 | 10 | | |
| Up for eviction | Elita; Viktorija | Ernestas; Gintautas; Tomas | Indrė; Viktorija | Gintautas; Viktorija | Andrius; Vytautas | Dileta; Jolita | Dileta; Jolita; Gintautas | Šarūnas; Tomas; Valdas; Vytautas | Gintautas; Jolita; Karolina | Laura; Tomas | Avgustina; Gintautas; Karolina; Valdas | Gintautas; Karolina; Laura; Šarūnas | | |
| Evicted | Elita; 38.1% to save | Ernestas; 12.7% to save | Indrė; 47.4% to save | Viktorija; 17.8% to save | Andrius; 48% to save | Eviction; Cancelled | Dileta; 12% to save | Vytautas; 17.5% to save | Jolita; 14.3% to save | Tomas; 46% to save | Valdas; 6% to save | Laura; 5.72% to win | Šarūnas; 22.6% to win | |
| Evicted | Elita; 38.1% to save | Ernestas; 12.7% to save | Indrė; 47.4% to save | Viktorija; 17.8% to save | Andrius; 48% to save | Eviction; Cancelled | Dileta; 12% to save | Vytautas; 17.5% to save | Jolita; 14.3% to save | Tomas; 46% to save | Avgustina; 9.3% to save | Karolina; 31.31% to win | | |
| Saved | Viktorija; 61.9% | Tomas; 27% Gintautas; 60.3% | Viktorija; 52.6% | Gintautas; 82.2% | Vytautas; 52% | Eviction; Cancelled | Jolita; 14.9% Gintautas; 73.1% | Valdas; 19.3% Tomas; 27.2% Šarūnas; 36% | Karolina; 31.5% Gintautas; 54.2% | Laura; 54% | Karolina; 23.5% Gintautas; 61.2% | Gintautas; 40.37% to win | | |

=== Notes ===
- ^Note 1: In week 2 Dileta and Indrė's nominations were not shown, thus they are unknown.
- ^Note 2: Following the initial nominations in week 3 there was tie between Dileta, Indrė and Jolita. The voice then decided to allow the housemates the option of doubling either Gintautas or Tomas nominations in order to break the tie. The housemates chose to double Gintautas nominations.
- ^Note 3: All housemates were eligible to vote in week 4 and in week 7, but only for housemates of the opposite gender.
- ^Note 4: In week 6 eviction was cancelled because it was the middle of the game.
- ^Note 5: All housemates were eligible to vote in week 8, but only for housemates of the male gender.
- ^Note 6: The voice decided to scrap all votes that week, and nominate male contestants except for Gintautas, as he had already been nominated 3 times before.
- ^Note 7: This week they can nominated people from the same gender.
- ^Note 8: Laura and Tomas were automatically nominated by the voice.
- ^Note 9: This week, 4 housemates will be nominated: 2 males and 2 females. There was a tie between all the female housemates. To break the tie, all housemates voted for a female.
- ^Note 10: In total there were 10.348 votes, and 592 were for Laura, 2.339 for Šarūnas, 3.240 for Karolina and 4.177 for Gintautas.

== Nominations: results ==
| Weeks | Nominated | Evicted |
|---|---|---|
| Week 1 | Viktorija (61.9%), Elita (38.1%) | Elita |
| Week 2 | Gintautas (60.3%), Tomas (27%), Ernestas (12.7%) | Ernestas |
| Week 3 | Viktorija (52.6%), Indrė (47.4%) | Indrė |
| Week 4 | Gintautas (82.2%), Viktorija (17.8%) | Viktorija |
| Week 5 | Vytautas (52%), Andrius (48%) | Andrius |
| Week 6 | ~~Jolita (51.9%), Dileta (48.1%)~~ | none |
| Week 7 | Gintautas (73.1%), Jolita (14.9%), Dileta (12%) | Dileta |
| Week 8 | Šarūnas (36%) , Tomas (27.2%), Valdas (19.3%), Vytautas (17.5%) | Vytautas |
| Week 9 | Gintautas (54.2%), Karolina (31.5%), Jolita (14.3%) | Jolita |
| Week 10 | Laura (54%), Tomas (46%) | Tomas |
| Week 11 | Gintautas (61.2%), Karolina (23.5%), Avgustina (9.3%), Valdas (6%) | Avgustina & Valdas |
| Week 12 | Gintautas (40.37%), Karolina (31.31%), Šarūnas (22.6%), Laura (5.72%) | Karolina, Šarūnas & Laura |
