= Secret Story (French TV series) season 9 =

Secret Story
- Season 9
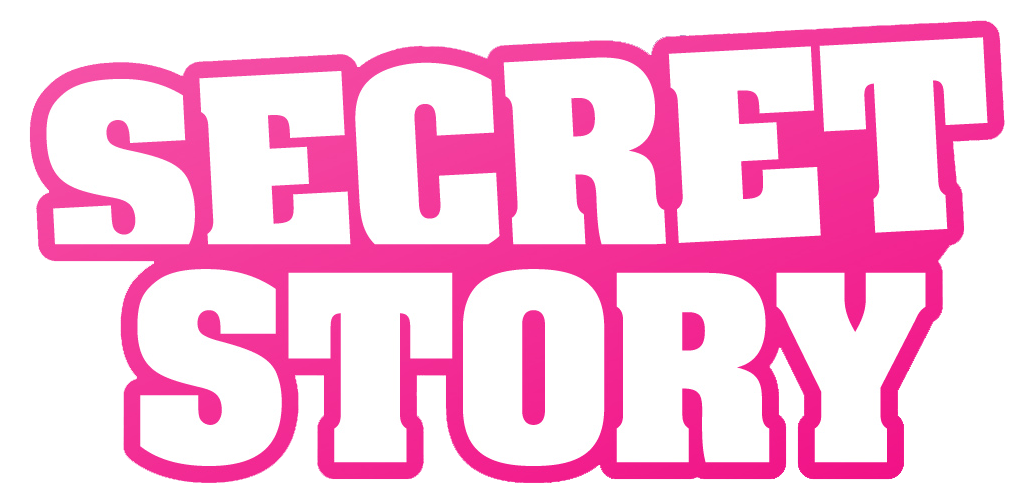
- Presented by: Christophe Beaugrand
- No. of days: 85
- No. of housemates: 16
- Winner: Émilie
- Runner-up: Jonathan
- Companion show: After Secret

Release
- Original network: TF1 (live shows); NT1 (Daily shows and After Secret)
- Original release: 21 August – 13 November 2015

Season chronology
- ← Previous; Season 8 Next → Season 10

Secret Story 9 is the ninth season of the French reality television series Secret Story, which is based loosely on the international Big Brother format. On 10 April 2015 TF1 and NT1 formalized a ninth season. It was confirmed daily recaps air on NT1 and live shows on TF1.

Following the departure of Benjamin Castaldi, Christophe Beaugrand will be the presenters.

It started on Friday 21 August 2015.

Émilie Fiorelli won the series on Day 85. Due to the November 2015 Paris attacks, the final was cancelled. Émilie confirmed that she had won the series on 15 November 2015 via Instagram, while the final results were announced on 18 November.

== House of Secrets ==
For the second time, after Secret Story 8, the house is located on the rooftop of the studios of AB Productions, where many popular sitcoms were filmed in the 1990s, such as Hélène et les Garçons and Premiers baisers. Perched on a building, the House of Secrets offers to the contestants a wide view of Paris.

== Housemates ==
=== Ali ===
- Ali Suna is a 24-year-old model, from Limoges, France. He entered on Day 1. He was evicted on Day 64.

=== Alia ===
- Alia Chergui is 25, from Paris, France. She works as a receptionist. She entered on Day 1. She was evicted on Day 43.

=== Arthur « Marley » ===
- Arthur Bauzac He entered on Day 1. He was evicted on Day 36.

=== Claudia ===
- Claudia Romani is a 33-year-old model from Miami (originally from Italy). She is Kévin's girlfriend, she shares a secret with Mélanie and Kévin : "We are La Voix's adventurers". She entered the house on Day 1, she will be the Kévin's and Mélanie's guide. She walked on Day 31.

=== Coralie ===
- Coralie Porrovecchio is a 19-year-old model and student, from Belgium. She was finalist in the contest of Miss Belgium 2014. She walked on Day 77.

=== Émilie ===
- Émilie Fiorelli is Loic's twin. She is 25 years old, from Marseille, France. She works as an ambulance attendant. She shares with Loïc the secret : "We are twins". She entered on Day 1. She won the series on Day 85.

=== Jonathan ===
- Jonathan Zidane is 26, from Marseille, France. He entered on Day 1. He is the cousin of a famous French footballer Zinedine Zidane. He became the runner up on Day 85.

=== Karisma ===
- Karisma Flageul is a 21-year-old student, from Loudéac, Bretagne, France. She entered on Day 1. She was evicted on Day 71.

=== Kévin ===
- Kévin Gleizes is 30. He is Claudia's boyfriend. He is from Miami, United States. He traveled to Dubai with Mélanie because of their secret. He was evicted on Day 29.

=== Loïc ===
- Loic Fiorelli is Émilie's twin. He is 25 years old, from Marseille, France. He works as an ambulance attendant and during winter as a ski instructor. He shares with Émilie the secret : "We are twins". He entered on Day 1. He finished in fourth place on Day 85.

=== Manon ===
- Manon Schobben is a 21-year-old cashier. She is from Grâce-Hollogne, Belgium, and gave birth to Lola when she was 16. She was evicted on Day 22, The day of his 22 years.

=== Mélanie ===
- Mélanie Da Cruz is 24. She is from Saint-Cloud, France. She was evicted on Day 78.

=== Nicolas ===
- Nicolas Scandale is 32. He is from France. He was evicted on Day 57.

=== Rémi ===
- Rémi Notta is a 24-year-old sporting coach from Saint-Tropez, France. He finished in third place on Day 85.

=== Tony ===
- Tony Scoffield is 26. He is from Melun, France. He was evicted on Day 15.

=== Vanessa « Lisa » ===
- Vanessa Grymonprez is 28, from Paris, France. She participated to Secret Story 3 in 2009, and her secret is : "I am an ex-contestant of Secret Story" She was evicted on Day 8.

== Houseguests ==
=== Julie ===
- Julie Ricci is a contestant of Secret Story 4. She stayed in the house two weeks (Day 57-Day 71) and had a relationship with Loic.

=== Nathalie ===
- Nathalie Andreani is a contestant of Secret Story 8. She stayed in the house two weeks (Day 57-Day 67) and had a relationship with Ali.

=== Eddy ===
- Eddy Ben Youssef is a contestant of Secret Story 7. He stayed in the house two weeks (Day 57-Day 67).

== Secrets ==
Name	Age	Country	Secret	Discovered by	Status
Émilie	25	France	"We are twins" (with Loïc, helped by Rémi)	Jonathan (Day 41)	Winner (Day 85)
Jonathan	26	France	"I am the cousin of a French football star"	Mélanie/Coralie (Day 60)	Finalist (Day 85)
Loic	25	France	"We are twins" (with Émilie, helped by Rémi)	Jonathan (Day 41)	Finalist (Day 85)
Rémi	25	France	"I was born in prison"	Jonathan (Day 71)	Finalist (Day 85)
Mélanie	24	France	"We are La Voix's adventurers" (with Claudia and Kévin)	Undiscovered	Evicted (Day 78)
Coralie	20	Belgium	"We are the subjects of unprecedented love experience" (with Nicolas)	Jonathan (Day 77)	Walked (Day 77)
Karisma	21	France	"I have never met my twin sister"	La Voix/Herself (Day 11)	Evicted (Day 71)
Ali	24	France	"105 247 people have allowed me to enter to the House of Secrets"	Jonathan (Day 57)	Evicted (Day 64)
Nicolas	33	France	"We are the subjects of unprecedented love experience" (with Coralie)	Jonathan (Day 77)	Evicted (Day 57)
Alia	25	France	"I am champion of France Boxing"	Ali (Day 27)	Evicted (Day 43)
Arthur	21	France	"I do not know my date of birth"	Undiscovered	Evicted (Day 36)
Claudia	33	United States / Italy	"We are La Voix's adventurers" (with Kévin and Mélanie)	Undiscovered	Walked (Day 31)
Kévin	30	United States	"We are La Voix's adventurers" (with Claudia and Mélanie)	Undiscovered	Evicted (Day 29)
Manon	21	Belgium	"I am ghost hunter"	Undiscovered	Evicted (Day 22)
Tony	26	France	"I am a Yamakasi"	Undiscovered	Evicted (Day 15)
Vanessa	28	France	"I am an ex-contestant of Secret Story"	Alia (Day 4)	Evicted (Day 8)

== Nominations ==
	Week 1	Week 2		Week 3	Week 4	Week 5	Week 6	Week 7		Week 8	Week 9	Week 10	Week 11	Week 12 Final	
	Week 1	Day 9	Day 12	Week 3	Week 4	Week 5	Week 6	Day 44	Day 48	Week 8	Week 9	Week 10	Week 11	Week 12 Final	
Émilie	Small; House	Karisma	Nicolas; Tony	Not; Eligible	Not; Eligible	Nominated	Not; Eligible	Nicolas; Jonathan	No; Nominations	Secret; Room	Exempt	Banned	No; Nominations	Winner (Day 85)	
Jonathan	Big; House	Karisma	Not; Eligible	Alia; Claudia	Nominated	Nominated	Émilie; Mélanie	Not; Eligible	No; Nominations	Not; Eligible	Exempt	Karisma	No; Nominations	Runner-Up (Day 85)	
Rémi	Big; House	Karisma	Not; Eligible	Banned	Exempt	Nominated	Alia; Mélanie	Not; Eligible	No; Nominations	Not; Eligible	Exempt	Karisma	No; Nominations	Third Place (Day 85)	
Loïc	Small; House	Karisma	Not; Eligible	Manon; Mélanie	Not; Eligible	Nominated	Alia; Mélanie	Not; Eligible	No; Nominations	Not; Eligible	Nominated	Coralie	No; Nominations	Fourth Place (Day 85)	
Mélanie	In Dubai	Karisma	Rémi; Loïc	Not; Eligible	Not; Eligible	No; Nominations	Not; Eligible	Rémi; Loïc	No; Nominations	Nicolas	Exempt	~~Rémi~~; Rémi	No; Nominations	Evicted (Day 78)	
Coralie	Big; House	Karisma	Loïc; Arthur	Exempt	Kévin; Ali	Nominated	Exempt	Ali; Loïc	Émilie; Loïc	Ali	Nominated	~~Loïc~~; Loïc	~~Exempt~~	Walked (Day 77)	
Karisma	Small; House	Nominated	Tony; Rémi	Not; Eligible	Not; Eligible	Nominated	Not; Eligible	Nicolas; Ali	No; Nominations	Nicolas	Nominated	~~Jonathan~~; Rémi	Evicted (Day 71)		
Ali	Small; House	Karisma	Not; Eligible	Manon; Alia	Nominated	Nominated	Émilie; Karisma	Not; Eligible	No; Nominations	Not; Eligible	Nominated	Evicted (Day 64)			
Nicolas	Big; House	Karisma	Not; Eligible	Alia; Émilie	Not; Eligible	No; Nominations	Alia; Émilie	Not; Eligible	No; Nominations	Not; Eligible	Evicted (Day 57)				
Alia	Big; House	Karisma	Tony; Rémi	Not; Eligible	Kévin; Jonathan	Nominated	Not; Eligible	Evicted (Day 43)							
Arthur	Small; House	Karisma	Not; Eligible	Manon; Alia	Not; Eligible	Nominated	Evicted (Day 36)								
Claudia	Big; House	Karisma	Rémi; Jonathan	Not; Eligible	Not; Eligible	Walked (Day 31)									
Kévin	In Dubai	Karisma	Exempt	Manon; Émilie	Nominated	Evicted (Day 29)									
Manon	Small; House	Karisma	Rémi; Nicolas	Not; Eligible	Evicted (Day 22)										
Tony	Big; House	Karisma	Not; Eligible	Evicted (Day 15)											
Vanessa	Big; House	Evicted (Day 8)													
Nominations Notes	1, 2, 3	4	5, 6	7, 8, 9	10, 11, 12	13, 14	15, 16	17, 18	19	20, 21	22, 23, 24	25	26	none	
Up for eviction	Alia; Claudia; Coralie; Jonathan; Nicolas; Tony; Vanessa	Karisma	Rémi; Tony	Alia; Manon	Ali; Jonathan; Kévin	Ali; Alia; Arthur; Coralie; Émilie; Jonathan; Karisma; Loïc; Rémi	Alia; Émilie; Mélanie	Ali; Loïc; Nicolas	None	Ali; Nicolas	Ali; Coralie; Karisma; Loïc	Karisma; Rémi	Émilie; Jonathan; Loïc; Mélanie; Rémi	Émilie; Jonathan; Loïc; Rémi	
Walked	none					Claudia	none						Coralie	none	
Evicted	Vanessa; 9% to save	Karisma; 14 of 14 votes to save	Tony; 19% to save	Manon; 14% to save	Kévin; 26,2% to save	Arthur; 3% to save	Alia; 24% to save	No; Eviction	Émilie; Coralie's choice to fake evict	Nicolas; 13% to save	Ali; 17,9% to save	Karisma; 38,3% to save	Mélanie; 14% to save	Loïc; 11% to win	Rémi; 16% to win
Evicted	Vanessa; 9% to save	Karisma; 14 of 14 votes to save	Tony; 19% to save	Manon; 14% to save	Kévin; 26,2% to save	Arthur; 3% to save	Alia; 24% to save	No; Eviction	Émilie; Coralie's choice to fake evict	Nicolas; 13% to save	Ali; 17,9% to save	Karisma; 38,3% to save	Mélanie; 14% to save	Jonathan; 22% to win	Émilie; 51% to win

=== Notes ===
^Note 1: In round one of nominations, Ali, Arthur, Émilie, Karisma, Loïc and Manon robbed the immunity inside the house and are immune, with Rémi, as their accomplice.
^Note 2: In round one of nominations, Alia, Claudia, Coralie, Jonathan, Nicolas, Tony and Vanessa were nominated because they failed to protect their immunity.
^Note 3: Kévin and Mélanie were in Dubai and were immune for not entering the game yet.
^Note 4: On Day 11, La Voix punished Karisma for lying about her secret. Her housemates then had to decide whether to save or evict her.
^Note 5: In round two of nominations, only female housemates could nominate and only male housemates could be nominated.
^Note 6: In week 2, La Voix's adventurers decided to use the power of immunity for Kévin.
^Note 7: In round three of nominations, only male housemates could nominate and only female housemates could be nominated.
^Note 8: Coralie has agreed to show all the gossip she said about Alia, Mélanie and Émilie to win immunity.
^Note 9: In week 3, La Voix's adventurers decided to use the power of ban voting for Rémi.
^Note 10: Émilie passed a secret mission that gave to Rémi an immunity for nominations of Week 4.
^Note 11: In round four of nominations, only male housemates could be nominated
^Note 12: Alia and Coralie had power to nominate the two male housemates of their choice.
^Note 13: Nicolas found Mélanie as her accomplice, they both escape nominations.
^Note 14: All housemates but Nicolas and Mélanie were up for eviction.
^Note 15: Nicolas accepted to reveal 7 clues about his secret to give an immunity to Coralie for the female nominations.
^Note 16: Rémi decided to be nominated to give a false clue about Émilie's and Loïc's secret to everyone. Later, Émilie decided to give a clue about her secret to remove Rémi's nomination.
^Note 17: In week 7, only female housemates could nominate and only male housemates could be nominated.
^Note 18: Due to Coralie's powers, nominations were canceled.
^Note 19: Coralie had to pre-nominate two housemates and to evict one of them. She decided to evict Émilie, but the eviction was fake without nobody knowing.
^Note 20: Émilie won the power of switching to save Loïc in case of nomination by the housemate of her choice. This power works only if Loïc is nominated.
^Note 21: In week 8, the nominations were as a group decision. Coralie, Nicolas and Jonathan in the Joconi group and Ali, Mélanie, Loïc, Rémi and kKarisma in the Serial Buzzers group. Only male housemates could be nominated.
^Note 22: Coralie was rewarded with an immunity for volunteering to be nominated.
^Note 23: Julie (Secret Story 4), Eddy (Secret Story 7) and Nathalie (Secret Story 8) decided to give immunities to Émilie, Jonathan and Mélanie.
^Note 24: Coralie could choose to protect an important clue about her secret by removing her immunity and giving it to Rémi or let the clue come out and remain immune. She accepted to protect a clue about her secret and she is no longer immune but Rémi is.
^Note 25: Participants had to vote for the housemate that should win a place in the pre-finals. Émilie received the most votes and is immune during week 10.
^Note 26:After several tests, Coralie won his place in the final against Jonathan. Jonathan has directly been nominated, and Coralie has drawn each person who would be nominated by his side: Emilie. Emilie and Jonathan were therefore automatically nominated and one of them had to leave the house on Thursday evening. However, Coralie looked back because his friend Jonathan has been nominated by her fault, and asked the voice to cancel his place in the final, which also cancels this nominations.

=== Nominations : results ===
Weeks	Nominated	Evicted
Week 1	Alia (13%), Claudia (19%), Coralie (22%), Jonathan (10%), Nicolas (14%), Tony (13%), Vanessa (9%)	Vanessa
Week 2	Rémi (81%), Tony (19%)	Tony
Week 3	Alia (86%), Manon (14%)	Manon
Week 4	Ali (46.5%), Jonathan (27.3%), Kévin (26.2%)	Kévin
Week 5	Ali (8%), Alia (10%), Arthur (3%), Coralie (9%), Émilie (27%), Jonathan (5%), Karisma (4%), Loïc (19%), Rémi (15%)	Arthur
Week 6	Alia (24%), Émilie (47%), Mélanie (29%)	Alia
Week 7	None	No Eviction
Week 8	Ali (87%), Nicolas (13%)	Nicolas
Week 9	Ali (17.9%), Coralie (19.4%), Karisma (38.3%), Loïc (24.4%)	Ali
Week 10	Karisma (38.3%), Rémi (61.7%)	Karisma
Week 11	Émilie (30%), Jonathan (22%), Loïc (15%), Mélanie (14%), Rémi (19%)	Mélanie
Week 12 - Final	Émilie (51%), Jonathan (22%), Loïc (11%), Rémi (16%)	Jonathan, Loïc & Rémi
