= Claudia Romani =

Italian American model (born 1982)

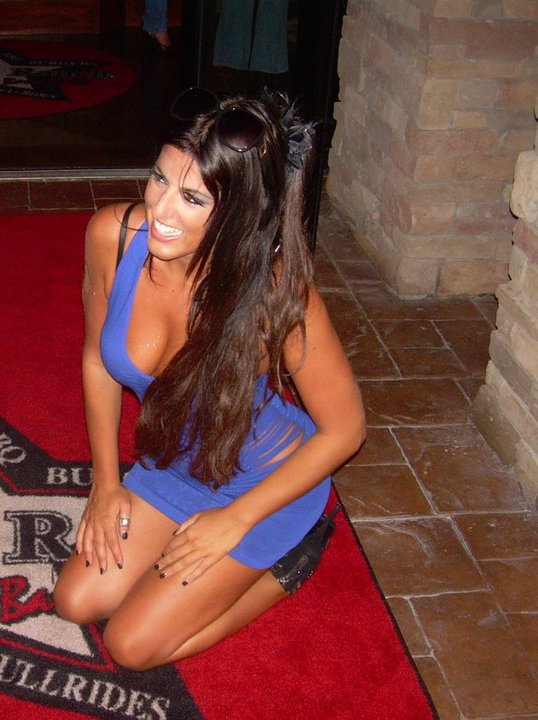
- Claudia Romani in Miami
- Born: April 14, 1982 (age 44); L'Aquila, Italy
- Other name: Claudia SS9
- Education: Multimedia Design at Lyngby Uddannelse Center, Denmark
- Occupations: International Model, TV Personality and Non Profit Owner
- Known for: Vegan activist, Model, Reality TV Personality, Founder and owner of Help Miami Cats Inc.
- Television: Esta Noche Tu Night, Secret Story 9 (Big Brother France), Tjeneste Denmark
- Height: 5 ft 7 in (1.70 m)

Claudia Romani (born April 14, 1982 in L'Aquila, Italy) is an Italian American model. She has appeared on covers such as GQ and Maxim, and in 2006 was voted one of the 100 Sexiest Women in the World by FHM Denmark. Since 2010, she is based in Miami, Florida.

== Biography ==
=== Modeling ===
Claudia Romani was born on April 14, 1982 in L'Aquila, Italy. She moved to Denmark in her late teens, also studying in England.

She has been featured in magazines such as FHM (Denmark, Turkey and Slovenia), GQ, Maxim (Italy and Greece), Cosmopolitan (UK), More!, Chulo Magazine, and Playboy Italy. She is the Model Consultant for Miami Life Magazine and has been featured on their cover numbers of times, as well as having been a cover model for Semanario Argentino, Gente Sur and others.

Romani has appeared on commercials for Samsung, Toyota, and Ford. In the Latin market she has appeared in shows such as Noche de Perros and Despierta America. She is also the official model on the TV show Esta Noche Tu Night on Mega TV.

In 2006, she was voted one of the 100 Sexiest Women in the World by FHM Denmark, she won the title of Miss Internet by Clarence as well as "Denmark's Most Beautiful Legs" by Q magazine and "Page 9 Miss Of the Year" by Ekstra Bladet. In February 2013 she was voted among the "Most Beautiful of 2012" by GQ Mexico, ahead of Sofia Vergara, Alyssa Miller, and Megan Fox.

She was voted best Bikini Body 2012 on the VH1 website in the supermodels category, beating Adriana Lima and Naomi Campbell. Afterwards she won in round 2 with Selena Gomez and in round 3 with Drita D'Avanzo. She was in the final with Beyoncé at the VH1 Bikini Awards Finals; Beyoncé won 52.88% against 47.12% Claudia. Three of Claudia's pictures also made it to the VH1 chart of the 100 Hottest Bikini Photos of 2012. Claudia won the 2014 Mentality Magazine March Hotness Tournament, beating out 64 of the most beautiful women in the world.

=== Spokespersoning ===
Claudia has been a spokesperson for Gran Fondo Giro d'Italia, a cycling race organized by Giro d'Italia and Gazzetta dello Sport in Miami. As of 2013 she retains the role and has traveled in the US as a spokesmodel for Gran Fondo, working at the Five Boro Bike Tour in New York City and the Interbike convention in Las Vegas. On November 10, 2013 she was the spokesperson for Gran Fondo Giro in Miami, posing at the start line with professional cyclist Pippo Pozzato, next to event sponsors Lamborghini. In the summer of 2013 Romani was invited along with several French media figures to join the Starwest Celebrity "Petanque" (bocce ball) tournament, in Arcachon, France, with her own team.

She is also a spokesperson for Forza l'Aquila alongside the Italian rugby team, in support of her hometown after it was hit by an earthquake. In August 2013 she was invited to the Circolo Tennis L'Aquila, where her grandfather used to play, for a photoshoot and to help with the tennis organization's international image-building after the earthquake. Also in the summer of 2013 she was chosen to represent her hometown soccer team L'Aquila Calcio.

In a December 2014 competition, she won competition "sexy supporter Italy."

=== Television ===
In 2015, Claudia has participated in the French Reality TV Show Secret Story 9, sharing the secret Nous sommes les Aventuriers de la Voix with her ex boyfriend and another candidate, Melanie Da Cruz, now Martial.

The couple had to pretend not to know each other, in order to spice up the game. Claudia left the show by her own choice after Kevin's elimination: Claudia's departure had the highest audience of the season during the "quotidien", the daily show aired on NT1.

== Personal life ==
Since 2009, she has lived in Miami, Florida. She is a vegan and animal rights activist.

She became an American citizen on March 23, 2019 after following the 01 Visa path based on Extraordinary Abilities.

Known animal lover and activist, in 2022 Claudia founded Help Miami Cats, a Non Profit feeding and supporting the Community Cats in Miami Beach.
