= TV8 (Lithuanian TV channel) =

TV8 Lithuania
- Logo used since 24 December 2022
- Country: Lithuania
- Broadcast area: Lithuania
- Headquarters: Kalvarijų g. 135, LT-08221 Vilnius, Lithuania

Programming
- Picture format: HDTV 1080i (downscaled to 16:9 576i for the SDTV feed)

Ownership
- Owner: Providence Equity Partners
- Sister channels: TV3; TV6; TV3 Plus; Go3 films Go3 Sport

History
- Launched: 3 October 2011; 13 years ago

Links
- Website: tv8.tv3.lt

TV8 is a Lithuanian terrestrial, satellite and cable television channel aimed at women, owned by Providence Equity Partners. It was launched on 3 October 2011. On the air: programs, series, lifestyle shows. TV8 shows mostly Lithuanian productions but also shows Turkish, German, Indian, Mexican, Nickelodeon shows, etc. The broadcaster is UAB All Media Lithuania.

TV8, as with other channels of the Media Baltics group in the Baltic States, switched to HD broadcasting on 26 July 2018.
