= TV6 (Lithuanian TV channel) =

TV6 Lithuania TV6 Lietuva
- Logo since October 3, 2022.
- Country: Lithuania
- Broadcast area: Lithuania
- Headquarters: Kalvarijų g. 135, LT-08221 Vilnius, Lithuania

Programming
- Picture format: SD, HD since January 1, 2018

Ownership
- Owner: Providence Equity Partners
- Sister channels: TV3; TV8; TV3 Plus; Go3 Films; Go3 Sport

History
- Launched: March 31, 2002
- Former names: Tango TV (2002—2008)

Links
- Webcast: TV6 on TV3 Play
- Website: tv6.tv3.lt

TV6 is a Lithuanian terrestrial, satellite and cable television channel owned by the media company Providence Equity Partners. It was launched on March 31, 2002 (as Tango TV). The broadcaster is UAB All Media Lithuania.

TV6 focuses on entertainment and occasional but high-profile sports broadcasts (like the UEFA Champions League), comedy, sitcoms, action, science fiction and reality programmes are popular fixtures.

TV6, as with other channels of the All Media Baltics group in the Baltic states, switched to HD broadcasting on 26 July 2018.
