= Secret Story (French TV series) season 8 =

Secret Story
- Season 8
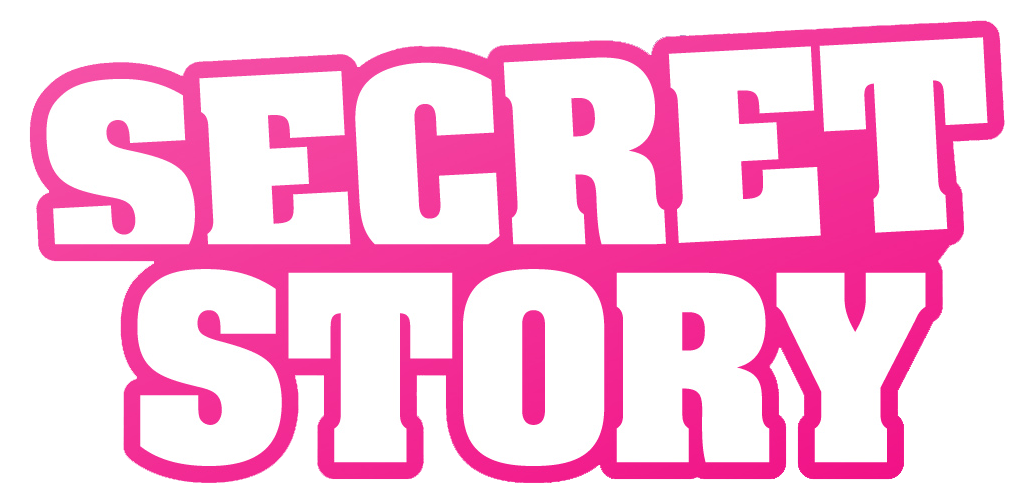
- Presented by: Benjamin Castaldi; Adrien Lemaître (After Secret)
- No. of days: 71
- No. of housemates: 15
- Winner: Leila
- Runner-up: Jessica
- Companion show: After Secret

Release
- Original network: TF1
- Original release: 18 July – 26 September 2014

Season chronology
- ← Previous; Season 7 Next → Season 9

Secret Story 8 is the eighth season of the French reality television series Secret Story, a show which is based loosely on the international Big Brother format. TF1 has formalized an eighth season on 27 January 2014.

Whereas several rumors explain that Benjamin Castaldi would not host the eighth season of Secret Story, he stated that he will. It was said Benjamin Castaldi will only host the live shows and not the daily recaps anymore, unlike previous seasons and that La Voix (Big Brother) will voice off the daily recaps, but it was revealed at the press release that Benjamin Castaldi would still host daily recaps and that nothing changes compared to previous seasons. Adrien Lemaitre returns to host the spin-off show: After Secret.

Due to the 2014 FIFA World Cup, this season is shortened and lasted 10 weeks. It started on Friday 18 July 2014 on TF1. It was confirmed the finale is on Friday 26 September 2014 at 10:45 p.m.

Leila Ben Khalifa, ex contestant of Grande Fratello 6, is the winner of Secret Story 8.

== House of Secrets ==
For the first time, this season's house is located on the rooftop of the studios of AB Productions which was used in the 1990s where many popular sitcoms were filmed, as Hélène et les Garçons and Premiers baisers. Perched on a building, the House of Secrets offers to the contestants a wide view of Paris.

The house has three different levels. The first and second floor, and a mysterious secret basement. The garden has a floating pool and for the first time in Secret Story's history a jacuzzi, a small terrace with a large table for breakfasts and dinners. Bedrooms are in the second floor and have windows with charming shutters.

The house has 64 cameras with most of them hidden behind countless mirrors and 40 microphones.

== Housemates ==
=== Abdel ===
- Abdel Sellou is 43 years old from Paris, France and a father of three. He entered on Day 1. He was ejected on Day 5. His secret is : "The story of my life generated 20 millions of entries in box office"

=== Aymeric ===
- Aymeric is 22 from Versailles. His secret is : "I am an imposter of the House of Secrets", he shares this secret with three other housemates : Leila, Sara and Stéfan, and his secret identity is : Vince. He entered on Day 1 in the House of Imposters. He was ejected on Day 56, After a fight with Sara.

=== Elodie ===
- Elodie Ortisset is a 22 years old artistic director in event planning from Montauban, France and is single. She entered on Day 1. she was evicted on Day 22.

=== Geoffrey ===
- Geoffrey is a 26 years old electrician from France. He lost his father four years ago. He entered on Day 1. He was evicted on Day 29.

=== Iliesse ===
- Iliesse is a 20 years old business student from Paris, France. He entered the House on Day 1. He was evicted on Day 15.

=== Jessica ===
- Jessica Silva is from Toulouse, France and works as a model . She occasionally plays soccer. Jessica has a boyfriend, and two identical sisters, Chloé and Audrey. La Voix made her travel to Las Vegas where she must build a secret in less than 24 hours before the launch show with Steph. If she doesn't succeed Big Brother's task, access to the main house will be denied. She entered on Day 1. She became the runner up on Day 71.

=== Joanna ===
- Joanna Thomae is a 31-year-old mother from Entressen, France. She entered on Day 1. She walked on Day 17. with the secret : "I lived a romance with Michael Jackson".

=== Julie ===
- Julie Couillard is a 31-year-old nail prosthetist from Le Havre, France. She's in a relationship with her boyfriend of 12 years and has a 2-year-old daughter with him. Her secret is that she is hyperthymesic. She entered on Day 1. She was evicted on Day 64.

=== Leila ===
- Leila Ben Khalifa is a 32-year-old actress from Tunisia. She now lives in Milan, Italy. She was a contestant during the sixth season of the Italian version of Big Brother. Her secret is : "I am an imposter of the House of Secrets", she shares this secret with three other housemates : Aymeric, Sara and Stéfan, and her secret identity is : Virginie. She entered on Day 1 in the House of Imposters. She won the series on Day 71.

=== Nathalie ===
- Nathalie is a 43-year-old businesswoman from Bastia, France. She entered the house on Day 1. She finished in fourth place on Day 71. with the secret : "My boyfriend is half my age" and entered with a secret task to act as if housemate Vivian was her 22-year-old son.

=== Sacha ===
- Sacha is a 23-year-old musician, singer and make up artist from Belgium. He entered on Day 1. He was evicted on Day 43.

=== Sara ===
- Sara Rose is a 20-year-old business student from the Var, France. She describes herself as « capricious, angry and ultra strategist ». She is ready to do anything to win, even seducing male housemates. She works as a model to make ends meet. Her secret is : "I am an imposter of the House of Secrets" She shares this secret with three other housemates : Leila, Aymeric and Stéfan, and her secret identity is : Lois. She entered on Day 1 in the House of Imposters. She was ejected on Day 56, After a fight with Aymeric.

=== Stéfan ===
- Stéfan is a 25-year-old business man from France who works in the video game industry. His mother died from cancer when he was 9 years old. His secret is : "I am an imposter of the House of Secrets", he shares this secret with three other housemates : Leila, Sara and Aymeric, and his secret identity is : Matt. He entered on Day 1 in the House of Imposters. He was evicted on Day 36.

=== Stéphane « Steph » ===
- Stéphane Rodrigues is a 31-year-old model from Luxembourg. He is also a dancer and appeared in a Shy'm music video. La Voix made him travel to Las Vegas where he must build a secret in less than 24 hours before the launch show with another contestant : Jessica. If he doesn't succeed Big Brother's task, access to the main house will be denied. He entered on Day 1. He was evicted on Day 50.

=== Vivian ===
- Vivian is 22 and is from Bastia, France. He entered the house on Day 1. He finished in third place on Day 71. with the secret : "My girlfriend is twice my age" and entered with a secret task to act as if housemate Nathalie was his 43-year-old mother.

== Houseguests ==
=== Anaïs ===
- Anaïs Camizuli is the winner of Secret Story 7.

=== Benoît ===
- Benoît Dubois is the winner of Secret Story 4. He entered as a guest in the Secret Story 8's house on Day/Night 47 and stays only for an evening along with Amélie.

=== Amélie ===
- Amélie Neten participated to Secret Story 4 in 2010. She also participated to Secret Story 7 as a guest and entered on Day 80, and quit on Day 87. She entered as a guest in the Secret Story 8's house on Day/Night 47 and stays only for an evening along with Benoît.

=== Zelko ===
- Zelko Stojanovic participated to Secret Story 5 in 2011 and was runner-up.

=== Zarko ===
- Zarko Stojanovic participated to Secret Story 5 in 2011 and is also the winner of Veliki Brat 2013.

== Secrets ==
Name	Age	Country	Secret	Discovered by	Status
Leila Ben Khalifa	32	Tunisia / Italy	"We are imposters" (with Aymeric, Sara and Stéfan)	Housemates (Day 7)	Winner
Jessica Silva	20	France	"We married at Las Vegas to enter on Secret Story" (with Stéphane)	Geoffrey (Day 11)	Runner-Up
Nathalie Andreani	43	France	"My boyfriend is half my age"	Jessica (Day 52)	3rd Place
Vivian Grimigni	22	France	"My girlfriend is twice my age"	Jessica (Day 52)	4th Place
Julie Couillard	31	France	"I am hyperthymesic"	Undiscovered	Evicted (Day 64)
Aymeric Bonnery	22	France	"We are imposters" (with Leila, Sara and Stéfan)	Housemates (Day 7)	Ejected (Day 56)
Sara Rose-Ange	20	France	"We are imposters" (with Leila, Aymeric and Stéfan)	Housemates (Day 7)	Ejected (Day 56)
Stéphane Rodrigues	31	Luxembourg	"We married at Las Vegas to enter on Secret Story" (with Jessica)	Geoffrey (Day 11)	Evicted (Day 50)
Sacha Buyse	23	Belgium	"I've been missing for more than a year"	Julie (Day 40)	Evicted (Day 43)
Stéfan Bentahar	25	France	"We are imposters" (with Leila, Sara and Aymeric)	Housemates (Day 7)	Evicted (Day 36)
Geoffrey Bouin	25	France	"I am the accomplice of the audience"	Undiscovered	Evicted (Day 29)
Élodie Ortisset	22	France	"I was born under anonymous childbirth"	La Voix/Herself (Day 18)	Evicted (Day 22)
Joanna Thomae	31	France	"I lived a romance with Michael Jackson"	Undiscovered	Walked (Day 17)
Iliesse Ardalane	21	France	"I am ailurophobic"	Undiscovered	Evicted (Day 15)
Abdel Yamine Sellou	43	France	"The story of my life generated 20 millions of entries in the box office"	Undiscovered	Ejected (Day 5)

== Weekly summary ==
Weekly summary
Week 1
Week 1	Secrets	"The story of my life generated 20 millions of entries in box office" (Abdel); "We are imposters of the House of Secrets (Aymeric, Leila, Sara and Stéfan)"; "I was born under anonymous childbirth" (Élodie); "I've been missing for more than a year" (Sacha); "I am the mole of Internet users" (Geoffrey); "We married at Las Vegas to enter on Secret Story (Steph and Jessica); "I lived a romance with Michael Jackson" (Joanna); "I am hyperthymesic" (Julie); "My boyfriend is half my age" (Nathalie); "My girlfriend is twice my age" (Vivian); "I am ailurophobic" (Iliesse)
Week 1	Tasks	On Day 0, Jessica and Steph had 24 hours to create a common secret at Vegas. If they not pass the task on Day 1, they will not enter in the house.; On Day 1, Aymeric had to change for a few minutes his identity to "Vince", a fictitious character, and must convince the housemates to select him as an official contestant on Day 8.; On Day 1, Nathalie and Vivian, the couple, received a secret mission. They must act like if they were mother and son to avoid possible suspicions about their secret.; On Day 3, Sara had to change for a few minutes her identity to "Lois", a fictitious character, and must convince the housemates to select her as an official contestant on Day 8.; On Day 4, Leila had to go in the Secret Zone with her real identity and convince the housemates to select her as an official contestant on Day 8.; On Day 5, Stéfan had to change for a few minutes his identity to "Matt", a fictitious character, and must convince the housemates to select him as an official contestant on Day 8.; On Day 6, Aymeric and Sara went at a different time of the day, to the Secret Zone for the second time as themselves and had to convince the housemates to select them as an official contestant on Day 8.; On Day 7, Leila had to change for a few minutes her identity to "Virginie", a fictitious character, and must convince the housemates to select her as an official contestant on Day 8.; On Day 7, Julie was elected "investigator of the week" by the viewers and was able to try to expose someone's secret. She chose Jessica and Stéph but did not find their secret.; On Day 8, Geoffrey must create a choir in the house of secrets, the lyrics must be intended for Jessica. If he passes the secret mission, Geoffrey will win €2,000.
Week 1	Twists	On Day 1, after entering the house, La Voix moved Sara, Stéfan, Leila and Aymeric to the House of Imposters. They must change of identity and convince the main house's contestants to accept their entry in the house at the end of the week. La Voix announced to the Imposters that out of four, only two of them will enter the house on Day 8.; Due to Abdel's ejection, this week's nominations were canceled.; On Day 7, as all the contestants never believed in identities of Sara, Aymeric, Leila and Stéfan, the Imposters had to reveal the name of their secret : "We are the Imposters of the House of Secrets".; On Night 7, La Voix decided to show to the main house contestants, the week of the impostors in the House of Imposters.; On Day 8, female housemates chose Aymeric to enter the house, male housemates chose Leila.; On Day 8, Leila and Aymeric must choose between Stéfan and Sara to enter the house, they selected Stéfan that later received a dilemma to choose to take Sara's place to face the public vote, then all the imposters would be immune for nominations or let Sara face the public vote. He chose to face the public vote instead of Sara.; On Day 8, Stéfan faces the public vote and received 84% of votes to save.
Week 1	Entrances	On Day 1, Abdel, Aymeric, Elodie, Geoffrey, Iliesse, Jessica, Joanna, Julie, Leila, Nathalie, Sacha, Sara, Stéfan, Steph and Vivian entered the house.
Week 1	Exit	On Day 5, Abdel was ejected for violence towards Vivian.
Week 2
Week 2	Tasks	On Day 11, female housemates were competing for the title of "Miss Secret Story 2014", the winner was selected by male housemates and Nathalie was the winner and won €1000.; On Day 12, housemates had to do imitations of each other. Nathalie and Vivian did the most convincing imitation according to La Voix (Big Brother) and shared €2000.; On Day 12, housemates competed in a dance "slow" contest. The duo finalists were Steph and Nathalie, Leila and Geoffrey and Vivian and Jessica. Housemates had to vote for the winner, Nathalie and Steph received the most votes to win and share €1000.; On Day 13, La Voix organized a rap battle involving the two nominees competing against each other. Housemates had to choose which nominee to join. The team of Geoffrey's team won.; On Day 14, Leila has been elected the most glamorous girl of the House of Secrets and must be the subject of the photoshoot of the House. In the evening, all the girls were to be Leila's servants and serve her and the men dinner and drinks.; On Day 14, La Voix gave €1500 to Leila that she had to split between three housemates of her choice. She decided to give €500 to Julie, Geoffrey and Sacha.; On Day 14, Geoffrey was given an earpiece for a secret mission and had to do everything La Voix told him to do.
Week 2	Twists	On Day 11, Geoffrey discovered Steph and Jessica's secret and therefore won €18 000 from Steph's and Jessica's pot.; On Day 12, Geoffrey and Iliesse face the public vote.
Week 2	Exit	On Day 15, Iliesse was evicted with 30% of votes to save.
Week 3
Week 3	Tasks	On Day 16, La Voix gave a one-week secret mission to Geoffrey. Geoffrey became the swindler of the House of Secrets. He must provide services and be useful to housemates and taking money away from their pots.; On Day 18, Elodie is punished by La Voix for revealing her secret and is nominated.
Week 3	Twists	On Day 15, Leila and Sara's nomination immunity was revoked by Julie and Geoffrey which protected clues on their secrets.; On Day 18, La Voix punished Élodie who revealed her secret to Joanna. Therefore, Élodie is nominated.; On Day 19, Élodie, Leila and Sara face the public vote.
Week 3	Exit	On Day 17, Joanna decided to leave.

== Nominations ==
	Week 1		Week 2	Week 3	Week 4	Week 5		Week 6	Week 7	Week 8	Week 9	Week 10	
	Day 5	Day 8	Week 2	Week 3	Week 4	Day 33	Day 36	Week 6	Week 7	Week 8	Week 9	Week 10	
Leila	House of Imposters	Stéfan	Geoffrey; Iliesse	Not; Eligible	Geoffrey; Stéfan	Jessica; Stéfan	Steph	Nominated	Steph; Sara	Nominated	No; Nominations	Winner (Day 71)	
Jessica	No nominations	Aymeric	Sacha; Steph	Not; Eligible	Nominated	Leila; Sacha	Saved	Not; Eligible	Steph; Sara	Exempt	Exempt	Runner-Up (Day 71)	
Vivian	No nominations	Sara	Not; Eligible	Leila; Sara	Not; Eligible	Leila; Sacha	Steph	Not; Eligible	Not; Eligible	Nominated	No; Nominations	Third Place (Day 71)	
Nathalie	No nominations	Stéfan	Geoffrey; Iliesse	Not; Eligible	Not; Eligible	Jessica; Stéfan	Steph	Sacha; Julie	Not; Eligible	Exempt	No; Nominations	Fourth Place (Day 71)	
Julie	No nominations	Aymeric	Steph; Iliesse	Not; Eligible	Not; Eligible	Leila; Sacha	Stéfan	Nominated	Not; Eligible	Nominated	No; Nominations	Evicted (Day 64)	
Aymeric	House of Imposters	Leila; Stéfan	Exempt	Sara; Julie	Not; Eligible	Jessica; Stéfan	Steph	Nominated	Not; Eligible	Nominated	Ejected (Day 56)		
Sara	House of Imposters	Saved	Geoffrey; Iliesse	Not; Eligible	Geoffrey; Stéfan	Jessica; Stéfan	Saved	Not; Eligible	Nominated	Nominated	Ejected (Day 56)		
Steph	No nominations	Leila	Not; Eligible	Sara; Julie	Not; Eligible	Jessica; Stéfan	Nominated	Not; Eligible	Nominated	Evicted (Day 50)			
Sacha	No nominations	Leila	Not; Eligible	Sara; Jessica	Not; Eligible	Jessica; Stéfan	Steph	Aymeric; Leila	Evicted (Day 43)				
Stéfan	House of Imposters	Nominated	Exempt	Sara; Leila	Nominated	Leila; Sacha	Nominated	Evicted (Day 36)					
Geoffrey	No nominations	Leila	Not; Eligible	Sara; Leila	Nominated	Evicted (Day 29)							
Élodie	No nominations	Aymeric	Geoffrey; Iliesse	Nominated	Evicted (Day 22)								
Joanna	No nominations	Aymeric	Steph; Iliesse	Walked (Day 17)									
Iliesse	No nominations	Leila	Not; Eligible	Evicted (Day 15)									
Abdel	Ejected (Day 5)												
Up for eviction	None	Stéfan	Geoffrey; Iliesse	Élodie; Leila; Sara	Geoffrey; Jessica; Stéfan	Jessica; Sara; Stéfan; Steph	Steph; Stefan	Aymeric; Julie; Leila; Sacha	Sara; Steph	~~Aymeric~~; ~~Julie~~; ~~Leila~~; ~~Sara~~; ~~Vivian~~	Julie; Leila; Nathalie; Vivian	Jessica; Leila; Nathalie; Vivian	
Nominations Notes	1, 2	3	3, 4	5, 6	7, 8, 9	10, 11	12	13	14, 15	16, 17, 18	19, 20	none	
Walked	none			Joanna	none								
Ejected	Abdel	none								Aymeric, Sara	none		
Evicted	No; Eviction	None	Iliesse; 30% to save	Élodie; 28.5% to save	Geoffrey; 28% to save	None	Stéfan; 1 of 6 votes to save	Sacha; 17% to save	Steph; 36.63% to save	Eviction; Cancelled	Julie; 19% to save	Nathalie; 10.4% to win	Vivian; 19.1% to win
Evicted	No; Eviction	None	Iliesse; 30% to save	Élodie; 28.5% to save	Geoffrey; 28% to save	None	Stéfan; 1 of 6 votes to save	Sacha; 17% to save	Steph; 36.63% to save	Eviction; Cancelled	Julie; 19% to save	Jessica; 19.2% to win	Leila; 51.3% to win

=== Notes ===
^Note 1: In round one of nominations only female housemates could nominate and only male housemates could be nominated.
^Note 2: As Abdel was ejected on Day 5 by La Voix for inappropriate behavior, nominations were canceled.
^Note 3: Housemates had to choose two imposters to enter the house, male housemates must choose between Sara and Leila and female housemates must choose between Aymeric and Stéfan. Later, as they were chosen by the housemates, Aymeric and Leila had a dilemma to choose between Stéfan and Sara to enter the house, they chose Stéfan. Later, Stéfan received a dilemma, if he accepts to pick Sara's place to face the public vote, all the imposters (Aymeric, Leila, Sara and Stéfan) are immune. He accepted.
^Note 4: In round two of nominations only female housemates could nominate and only male housemates could be nominated.
^Note 5: In order to destroy clues on their secrets, Julie and Geoffrey accepted to remove the immunity of Sara and Leila for nominations of week 3.
^Note 6: Élodie revealed her secret and therefore is nominated.
^Note 7: In round four of nominations, only male housemates could be nominated.
^Note 8: As a revenge for manipulating male housemates to nominate Leila, this latter had opportunity to nominate Jessica. She accepted the offer of La Voix.
^Note 9: Leila and Sara have power to nominate two male housemates as they nominated them in Week 3.
^Note 10: In the room of shields, Stéfan had to give a fake immunity to one of his fellow housemate while it is a nomination. He must remain secret until La Voix reveals it on Day 32. He decided to nominate Sara by giving her a fake immunity.
^Note 11: In round five of nominations, all the housemates were eligible to nominate and to nominate whoever they want, in duos. Aymeric and Nathalie, Leila and Sacha, Jessica and Stéfan, Sara and Steph, Vivian and Julie.
^Note 12: Stéfan and Steph received the fewest votes to save and therefore are in danger for eviction. All the housemates have to save one of them. Sara and Jessica were not eligible to save one of them as they were nominated.
^Note 13: Housemates are divided into two houses. Jessica, Steph, Julie, Sacha and Vivian in the main house and Sara, Nathalie, Aymeric and Leila in the little house. Each house had to elect a "leader" of their house. Main house chose Sacha, little house chose Nathalie. As chiefs of their houses, Sacha and Nathalie will nominate on Day 40 two housemates of the opposite house.
^Note 14: After being up for eviction along Sacha, Julie and Aymeric, Leila was evicted for fake and therefore joined the Secret Room. On Day 45, La Voix revealed to Aymeric that only Sacha was evicted and Leila was in secret room, Aymeric joined Leila in Secret Room but still lives in the main house.
^Note 15: Jessica becomes another Leila's complice and is aware Leila is still in the house. La Voix gave them both the power to nominate one male and one female housemate to face the public's vote.
^Note 16: During the live show, the red phone his apparition, all the housemates had to pass the phone to another and the last one who received it was nominated. As Sara was the last one to have it, she was nominated. To protect their secret, Nathalie and Vivian had the possibility to take Sara's nomination for one of them. They chose Vivian. Then, Leila received a dilemma: she could give Aymeric the possibility to see his brother but she would take Vivian's nomination. She accepted. Then, Sara and Steph could nominate Jessica but all the housemates money would be divided by two. They accepted, Jessica therefore became nominated next to Leila. But, Aymeric and Julie could replace Jessica and Leila with Nathalie and Vivian. They accepted, Nathalie and Vivian therefore became the nominees. Finally, Nathalie and Vivian had the possibility to save one of them, but clues of their secret would be revealed to the house. They accepted and saved Nathalie. Vivian therefore remained the only nominee.
^Note 17: Vivian, as a nominee, had then to choose 2 housemates to win immunity. He chose Nathalie and Jessica. The other housemates faced eviction with him.
^Note 18: In week 8, nominations were cancelled as Aymeric and Sara were ejected. The housemates have to choose if they merit to stay. Only Leila and Julie vote for the return of the two housemates.
^Note 19: Jessica won a free pass to the final.
^Note 20: In week 9, due to the last nominations before the final, there were no nominations, and all the housemates except to Jessica were up for eviction.

== Nominations totals received ==
	Week 1		Week 2	Week 3	Week 4	Week 5		Week 6	Week 7	Week 8	Week 9	Week 10	Total
	Day 5	Day 8	Week 2	Week 3	Week 4	Day 33	Day 36	Week 6	Week 7	Week 8	Week 9	Week 10	Total
Jessica	–	–	–	1	–							Finalist	
Leila	–	5	–	3	–							Finalist	
Nathalie	–	–	–	0	–							Finalist	
Vivian	–	–	0	–	0							Finalist	
Julie	–	–	–	2	–							Evicted	
Aymeric	–	4	–	–	0						Ejected		
Sara	–	1	–	6	–						Ejected		
Steph	–	–	3	–	0					Evicted			
Sacha	–	–	1	–	0				Evicted				
Stéfan	–	3	–	–	2			Evicted					
Geoffrey	–	–	4	–	2	Evicted							6
Élodie	–	–	–	–	Evicted								0
Joanna	–	–	–	Walked									0
Iliesse	–	–	6	Evicted									6
Abdel	Ejected												N/A

=== Nominations : Results ===
- The results of nominations with percentages included

Weeks	Nominated	Evicted
Week 1	Stéfan (84% - saved)	Abdel
Week 2	Geoffrey (70%), Iliesse (30%)	Iliesse
Week 3	Élodie (28.5%), Leila (34%), Sara (37.5%)	Élodie
Week 4	Geoffrey (28%), Stéfan (31%), Jessica (41%)	Geoffrey
Week 5	Jessica (27%), Sara (29%), Stéfan (18%), Steph (26%)	Stéfan
Week 6	Aymeric (28%), Julie (26%), Leila (29%), Sacha (17%)	Sacha
Week 7	Sara (63.37%), Steph (36.63%)	Steph
Week 8	~~Aymeric, Julie, Leila, Sara, Vivian~~	Sara, Aymeric
Week 9	Leila (40%), Nathalie (20%), Vivian (21%), Julie (19%)	Julie
Week 10 - Final	Leila (51.3%) , Jessica (19.2%), Nathalie (10.4%), Vivian (19.1%)	Nathalie, Vivian, Jessica

== Ratings ==
=== Prime Time ===
Show N°	Day	Viewers	Ratings Share
1 - Launch	Friday 18 July	3,066,000	17.8%
2	Friday 25 July	2,078,000	20.9%
3	Friday 1 August	1,900,000	20.4%
4	Friday 8 August	1,700,000	19.6%
5	Friday 15 August	1,719,000	18.8%
6	Friday 22 August	1,736,000	20.8%
7	Friday 29 August	1,728,000	23.8%
8	Friday 5 September	1,532,000	22.8%
9	Friday 12 September	1,902,000	22%
10	Friday 19 September	1,833,000	22.8%
11 - Final	Friday 26 September	2,143,000	21.2%

=== After Secret ===
Show N°	Day	Viewers	Ratings Share
1 - Live	Friday 18 July	473,000	16.7%
2	Friday 25 July	1,120,000	23.2%
3	Friday 1 August	1,000,000	23%
4	Friday 8 August	1,100,000	23%
5	Friday 15 August	1,200,000	23%
6	Friday 22 August	1,100,000	25.6%
7	Friday 29 August	1,000,000	28.4%
8	Friday 5 September	1,000,000	28%
9	Friday 12 September	1,000,000	25%
10	Friday 19 September	1,000,000	25%
11 - Final	Friday 26 September	1,000,000	21.7%
