= Christophe Beaugrand =

French television presenter and journalist (born 1977)

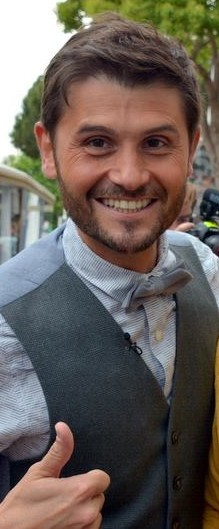
- Beaugrand in 2016
- Born: January 2, 1977 (age 49); Massy, France
- Occupations: Television presenter, journalist
- Years active: 1992–present
- Notable credit(s): Confessions intimes La matinale Weekend on LCI
- Spouse: Ghislain Gérin (m. 2018)
- Children: 1

Christophe Beaugrand (born January 2, 1977) is a French television presenter and journalist.

== Early life and education ==
Christophe Beaugrand was born in Massy in the department of Essonne. During his adolescence, he wrote for television series and comics in a child magazine. In 1992, he made his debut in audiovisual starting in radio. He began his career as a radio presenter in a local radio station of the Essonne and later on Ado FM. In the meantime, he studied journalism at the CELSA of Neuilly. In 1988, he participated at a talent show hosted by Jacques Martin, finishing among the finalists.

After a hypokhâgne, Beaugrand graduated at the IUT de Journalisme of Bordeaux in 1999, and he made freelance works for printed media, especially for France Soir. He then worked for the programs Éconoclaste on La Cinquième, Télématin on France 2, and Home Cinema on TPS Star.

== Television career ==
In 1999, he joined the news channel LCI as a reporter and an editor. In 2000, he was one of the replacing presenters of the channel. He also presented the news broadcast on weekends on the same channel before creating LCI est à vous, a news program created from the list of articles with the most views on the site LCI. From 2004 to 2006, he co-hosted Le Set with Marie Labory, a daily culture program broadcast on Pink TV.

In 2006, for about a year, he presented every week the column "People Police" in 50 Minutes Inside on TF1, the news of famous celebrities. In September 2007, he joined the Canal+ Group to present every morning Le JT des médias on La Matinale hosted by Bruce Toussaint on Canal+. He also presented I>Net, a program dedicated to the Internet on the channel I>Télé, the continuous news channel of the group in 1 h 30 chrono presented by Thomas Hugues, with a rebroadcast on Info soir. In early 2008 he co-hosted with Émilie Besse a short version of La Matinale.

Since September 2008, while still pursuing on La Matinale with Maïtena Biraben, he presents the section Mediaplanet every Saturday on + Clair. In July 2009, he left Canal+ to join TF1 in September as a columnist in the programs 10 h le Mag and 50 minutes inside, and presents L'After news on LCI, a weekly talk show about culture and news. He also presents with Ariane Brodier the musical reality program Pop Job on Virgin 17.

Since October 2013, he presents the entertainment program Confessions intimes on NT1.

== Personal life ==
Beaugrand is openly gay and on 25 July 2018, he married his partner Ghislain Gerin in a civil ceremony in the 8th arrondissement of Paris, with a second ceremony for friends and relatives on 28 July in Châteauneuf-de-Gadagne.

== Bibliography ==
- Christophe Beaugrand (2011). Dictionnaire malhonnête de la télévision. Balland, coll. p. 416. ISBN 978-2353151318.
