= Big Brother Canada season 11 =

Season of television series

Big Brother Canada
- Season 11
- The title card for Big Brother Canada 11
- Presented by: Arisa Cox
- No. of days: 69
- No. of houseguests: 16
- Winner: Terrell "Ty" McDonald
- Runner-up: Claudia Campbell
- Canada's Favourite HouseGuest: Jonathan Leonard
- No. of episodes: 29

Release
- Original network: Global
- Original release: March 8 – May 11, 2023

Additional information
- Filming dates: March 4 – May 11, 2023

Season chronology
- ← Previous; Season 10 Next → Season 12

Big Brother Canada 11 is the eleventh season of the Canadian reality television series Big Brother Canada. The series premiered on March 8, 2023, on Global. Hosted by Arisa Cox, the show revolves around sixteen contestants (known as HouseGuests), who volunteered to reside in a house under constant surveillance and without any communication with the outside world as they compete to win a grand prize of C$100,000 cash.

Terrell "Ty" McDonald, a personal trainer from Toronto, Ontario, was named the winner of the show on the season finale aired on May 11, 2023. McDonald became the second Black Canadian to win the show after Tychon Carter-Newman in Big Brother Canada 9. He defeated fellow finalist Claudia Campbell in an 8–1 vote from the jury of previously evicted HouseGuests. Meanwhile, Jonathan Leonard was voted as Canada's Favourite HouseGuest.

== Format ==
Big Brother Canada follows a group of contestants, known as House Guests who move into a custom-built house outfitted with cameras and microphones, recording their every move 24 hours a day. The House Guests are sequestered in the Big Brother Canada House with no contact with the outside world. During their stay, the House Guests share their thoughts on events and other HouseGuests inside a private room referred to as the Diary Room. At the start of each week in the house, the House Guests compete for the title of Head of Household, often shortened to simply HoH. The winner of the HoH competition is immune from eviction and will name two House Guests to be nominated for eviction. After the nominees are determined, the Power of Veto competition is played. Five players will compete in the competition: the two nominees and three random players, with the winner receiving the Power of Veto. If a House Guest chooses to exercise the Power of Veto, the Head of Household is obligated to name a replacement nominee. The holder of the Power of Veto is safe from being nominated as the replacement nominee. On eviction night, all House Guests must vote to evict one of the nominees, with the exception of the nominees and the Head of Household. The eviction vote is by secret ballot, with House Guests casting their votes orally in the Diary Room. In the event of a tied vote, the Head of Household will cast a tie-breaking vote publicly. The nominee with the majority of the votes is evicted from the house. Midway through the season, the evicted House Guests go on to become members of the "jury"; the jury is responsible for choosing who wins the series. The final Head of Household competition is split into three parts; the winners of the first two rounds compete in the third and final round. Once only two House Guests remain, the members of the jury cast their votes for who should win the series.

== HouseGuests ==
The cast of the eleventh season of Big Brother Canada. From left to right: Vanessa, Ty, Dan, Renee, Santina, Anika, Kuzie, Roberto, Amal, Jonathan, John Michael, Hope, Claudia, Zach, Shanaya and Daniel

The images and profiles of the HouseGuests for the eleventh season were released on Wednesday, March 1, 2023.

Name	Age	Occupation	Residence	Result
Terrell "Ty" McDonald	27	Personal trainer	Toronto, Ontario	Winner; Day 69
Claudia Campbell	25	Marketing coordinator	Kensington, Prince Edward Island	Runner-up; Day 69
Daniel Clarke	33	Graphic designer	Toronto, Ontario	Evicted; Day 69
Anika Mysha	28	Investment advisor	Saskatoon, Saskatchewan	Evicted; Day 63
Renee Mior	24	Law student	Vaughan, Ontario	Evicted; Day 60
Shanaya Carter	27	Bartender	Victoria, British Columbia	Evicted; Day 55
Kuzivakwashe "Kuzie" Mujakachi	29	9-1-1 operator	Victoria, British Columbia	Evicted; Day 55
Hope Agbolosoo	23	Skills coach	Milton, Ontario	Evicted; Day 48
Santina Carlson	29	Aesthetician	Edmonton, Alberta	Evicted; Day 42
Jonathan Leonard	33	Fisherman	Paradise, Newfoundland	Evicted; Day 41
Dan Szabo	28	DJ	Niagara Falls, Ontario	Evicted; Day 34
Zach Neilson	34	Senior vice president	Ottawa, Ontario	Walked; Day 26
Vanessa MacTavish	42	Yoga instructor	Calgary, Alberta	Walked; Day 22
Roberto Lopez	30	Gym manager	Toronto, Ontario	Evicted; Day 20
John Michael Sosa	28	Project manager	Bradford, Ontario	Evicted; Day 13
Amal Bashir	28	Superfan	Toronto, Ontario	Walked; Day 4

=== Future appearances ===
In 2023, Kuzie Mujakachi competed on season one of The Traitors Canada. In 2025, Ty McDonald competed on the third season of The Traitors Canada.

== Summary ==
Week 1 & 2
On Day 1, 16 House Guests entered the murder-mystery-themed Big Brother Canada Manor. Arisa revealed that there will be no eviction in the first week, though she revealed the first big twist of the season, known as "Dead Last", in which the House Guest to place last in the Head of Household competition will be automatically nominated as a third nominee.
- HoH Competition Part 1 ("Rough Around the Hedges"): One House Guest from each pair must untie knots to release a series of puzzle pieces. They must then weave a key through the vines up to their teammate, who will unlock the hatch and untie their own pieces. Each pair must then work together to solve the puzzle. The first pair to complete the puzzle will win the competition and will compete against one another for Head of Household. The last-place pair will also compete against each other to determine Dead Last. John Michael and Santina were the winners, while Renee and Shanaya came in last.
- HoH Competition Part 2: The House Guests in each pair then raced to a puzzle of season 10 winner Kevin Jacobs' head. They must then maneuver their hedges so they can roll a ball down a chute into his crown. The first House Guest to land the ball (between John Michael and Santina) will be the first Head of Household; the last House Guest to land the ball (between Renee and Shanaya) would become Dead Last. Renee became Dead Last, while Santina became the first Head of Household.

On Day 4, Amal walked from the game for personal reasons. John Michael told Zach that he wanted to target the strong men if he won HOH. Zach, in turn, rallied the other guys together to convince Santina to go after John Michael. The House Guests also learned they can earn Wendy's Reward Points that could help their game in the future. On Day 6, Claudia was voted by the public to receive the "BelAir Direct Eviction Protection Insurance", granting them immunity for the week. On Day 7, Santina nominated Anika and Dan alongside Renee for eviction, an intent to backdoor John Michael.

On Day 8, the nominees, alongside Daniel and Ty, competed in the Power of Veto competition.

- PoV Competition ("Can't Slop, Won't Slop") House Guests must fill their cups with the secret sauce, slide down their lane, and pour it into their jugs. After their jugs are full, they must mix it with oatmeal to make slop. House Guests have to then launch the slop into their barrel to lift it. The first House Guest to raise their barrel will win the Power of Veto, while the losers will go on slop until after the Veto Meeting. Ty won the competition, while Anika, Dan, Daniel, and Renee went on slop.

On Day 10, Ty took Anika off the block, and Santina nominated John Michael as the replacement nominee. After the veto meeting, John Micheal rallied hard trying to get numbers to stay. On Day 13, John Michael was evicted by a unanimous vote of 11–0–0. It was then announced that the "Dead Last" twist was over.

Week 3
Following John Michael's eviction, the House Guests competed in the Head of Household Competition.
- HoH Competition ("Basket Slide"): The house guests grabbed a ball from the bottom, ran to the top, and slid down while shooting their ball into point-valued baskets. Dan racked up the most points and was crowned the Head of Household.

On Day 15, Dan nominated Renee and Hope for eviction, with the intention of backdooring Roberto.

On Day 16, the nominees, alongside Kuzie, Vanessa and Zach competed in the Power of Veto competition

- PoV Competition ("Philips Sonicare")The house guest first needs to complete a toothbrush puzzle and then balance it upward. The person who finished it first will be ranked higher in the second part of the competition. Then they would go head to head where they need to take the bristles and place them in the corresponding hole. There is a 2-minute time limit and whichever house guest has more bristles in the hole would move on and eliminate the other houseguest. The winner of the final round would win the Power of Veto. Zach won the final round and earned the Power of Veto along with a $5000 cash prize from Philips Sonicare.

Rallying for Roberto to be evicted, Zach used the Power of Veto on Hope; Dan nominated Roberto as the replacement. Vanessa and Zach were then involved in a screaming match, about how the latter was trying to play all sides. On Day 20, after much debate, Roberto was evicted by a vote of 7–4 with Vanessa, Hope, Santina, and Jonathan voting to evict Renee.

Week 4
Following Roberto's eviction, the House Guests competed in the Head of Household Competition.
- HoH Competition ("Croquet All Day"): The house guest first need to balance tiles on a narrow platform to make a path for the croquet ball. Then they would make the shot and try to aim for the end post. Kuzie was the first one to get the ball to the end zone and was crowned the Head of Household.

On Day 22, Jonathan was voted by the public to receive the "BelAir Direct Eviction Protection Insurance", granting them immunity for the week. Kuzie nominated Santina and Vanessa for eviction, with the intention of evicting Santina. Vanessa, however, subsequently walked from the game on the same day, forcing Kuzie to name a new nominee; she nominated Hope as the replacement nominee.

On Day 24, the nominees, along with Anika, Ty and Zach competed in the Power of Veto competition

- PoV Competition ("Every Drop Counts"): The house guest first needed to toss carbon balls into the Brita Filter, then water will spray out one of three taps and they must move and catch the water to fill it into a jug. Then they would transfer the jug to a glass to fill up and retrieve a ball. Hope was the first one to fill with enough water and retrieve the ball, thus giving him the Power of Veto and a $5000 cash prize from Brita.

Hope used the Veto on himself and Kuzie named Zach as the replacement nominee. Zach then noticed an unauthorized item from Hope and informed production about it. Hope was confronted about the letter, which later sparked an argument in the house. After the talk with a producer, they announced that Hope would lose a vote in the upcoming eviction and would be ineligible for the next Head of Household competition. Everyone then received a letter from home to make up for the incident. However, this upsets Ty and Zach who wanted him ejected for bringing an unauthorized item into the house.

On Day 26, Ty and Zach both contemplated walking from the game. Ultimately, Ty decided to stay in the house while Zach walked from the game. As Zach was a nominee, this week's eviction was cancelled.

Week 5
Following Zach's departure from the Manor, the House Guest competed in whodunit week where both Head of Household and Power of Veto competitions are invisible.
- Invisible HoH Competition ("The Inheritance"): One at a time, the house guest would see a pile of $50,000. Then they would bid on how much money would they like to bid. If the highest bid was less than $50,000, then the leftover money would be added to the prize money. The highest bidder will become the invisible Head of Household. In an event of a tie, they would answer a question in which what was the average bid. Santina became the new Head of Household.

On Day 28, Santina anonymously nominated Dan and Ty.

On Day 30, the nominees, along with Claudia, Daniel and Hope competed in the Power of Veto competition

- Invisible PoV Competition ("Power Heist"): The House guest would first need to disable the laser from the vault and poles, then they would need to collect as much gold or currency to get to the target weight of 500lb. There were also 3 keys that would unlock 3 different weight references. There was a 30-minute time limit and once a house guest was comfortable with the amount, they would lock in the scores. Daniel was the closest to 500lb at 490 lb, winning him the Power of Veto.

Daniel anonymously used the Veto to take Ty off the block and Invisible HOH Santina put up Claudia as the replacement nominee.

On Day 34, just before the vote, the public viewers voted for their favourite moment of the season so far. Kuzie's Week 3 HOH win was voted as their favourite and won a $1000 WINNERS Gift Card. In a unanimous vote of 8–0, Dan was evicted and became the first member of the jury.

Week 6
Following Dan's eviction, the HouseGuest competed in the Head of Household competition
- HoH Competition ("Get a Grip"): The House guest needs to hold on to their buoy line at an angle while battling the harsh storm elements. If a house guest falls off their pole, then they would be eliminated. The last house guest standing will become the new Head of Household. After a 5 hour's battle, Ty outlasted Hope to become the next Head of Household.

On Day 34, It was announced that Santina won a public vote from the "BelAir Direct Eviction Protection Insurance", which granted her immunity for the week. Ty originally wanted to evict Santina from the house but decided to shift to the other target to Renee. Ty nominated Hope and Renee for eviction.

On Day 36, the nominees, along with Claudia, Santina and Shanaya competed in the Power of Veto competition

- PoV Competition ("Belairdirect"): The house guest competed in a 1 v 1 battle, with the loser being eliminated. The winner of the final round would win the Power of Veto. In the first round, they needed to first fix the rail of the fence and put the rungs in the correct spot. Then they would need to pick up the trash. Hope and Santina competed in this round and Hope won. In the second round, they must put the bushes in the correct spot before removing the damaged tires from the car. Then they need to roll the 4 damaged wheels into the slot. Then they need to attached the new wheels onto the car. Renee and Shanaya competed in this round with Shanaya winning. In the third round, they need to gather the tiles for their sidewalk and place them in the correct spot. Then they would need to fix the brick wall by putting them in the correct spot. Claudia and Hope competed in this round and Claudia emerged victorious. In the final round, the final 2 people needed to guide their ball into the 4 slots. Shanaya guided all 4 balls into the slot, granting her the Power of Veto and a $5000 cash prize from Bel Air Direct.

Shanaya used the Veto to take off Renee from the block. With the original target now safe, Ty decide to target Jonathan and put him up as a replacement nominee beside Hope. On Day 41, Jonathan was evicted in a 4–3 vote with Claudia, Renee and Shanaya voting to evict Hope. He became the second member of the jury.

Week 7
Following Jonathan's eviction, the HouseGuest competed in the Head of Household competition
- HoH Competition ("Circle K Trivia Showdown"): Two at a time, the house guest would need to answer a questions based on the Circle K room. The first house guest to buzz in gets to answer. A correct answer eliminates their opponent. But an incorrect answer results in their elimination. The surviving player then chooses the next two to face off. The last house guest standing would become the next Head of Household. Kuzie answered the last question correct, making her the new Head of Household.

On Day 42, books were starting to fly off the Manor's library. It showed a puzzle which lead to searching and ripping through books. It read 'you are invited' and the house guest were invited to a feast. Unknowingly, it was known as Fatal Feast. As Head of Household, Kuzie would start the chain of safety by selecting another house guest to be safe. Then that house guest would choose the next person to be safe until there are three people remaining. The remaining three will compete in a safety competition to determine the final person safe and the remaining two will be the nominees for the Fatal Feast. Kuize started by saving Hope, then Hope saved Anika, followed by Daniel, Shanaya and finally Claudia. Leaving Renee, Santina and Ty to compete in the safety competition.

- Safety Competition ("Too Hot to Candle"): One at a time, the house guest need to place candles onto the chandelier arm based on the color. They need to start at the bottom and spin the chandelier to get to the place, which could spill the candles. The house guest with the fastest time will earn safety leaving the other two to face eviction. At a time of 7:17, Ty was awarded safety, leaving Renee and Santina to face eviction.

Both Santina and Renee campaigned very hard to stay in the house. Ultimately, Santina became the victim of the Fatal Feast as she was evicted in a unanimous vote of 6–0, making her the third member of the jury.

Immediately following Santina's eviction, the House guest competed in the Head of Household competition.

- HoH Competition ("Pick your Poison"): Each round, house guest are presented with drinks in a shot glass. One of which is poisoned which will taste horrible. They will then choose one of the drinks and sample it. There, they need to guest which house guest had the poisoned drink. If at least one person guess correctly, then the house guest who drank the poison will be eliminated. However, if no one guess correctly, the house guest who drank the poison will choose one person to eliminate. Once 2 house guest are left, they need to answer a tie-breaking question. Claudia answered the tie breaking question to the closest answer, making her the new Head of Household.

On Day 43, Claudia nominated Hope and Ty for eviction, with Ty as her target.

On Day 44, the nominees, along with Anika, Renee and Shanaya competed in the Power of Veto competition.

- PoV Competition ("Double Dutch"): Using 2 ropes and the tension, the house guest needs to guide the balls onto their post. If they drop the ball, they need to pick it up and start again. Whoever is the first one to get all 9 balls on the 9 post would win the Power of Veto. Ty was the winner.

On Day 45, Ty used the veto to save himself. Claudia then nominated Kuzie as the replacement nominee. On Day 48, Hope became the next house guest evicted in a vote of 4–1, with Ty voting to evict Kuzie. He became the fourth member of the jury.

Week 8
Following Hope's eviction, the House guest competed in the Head of Household competition.
- HoH Competition ("Before or After"): Arisa will read out events that happened in the house. Then the house guest will need to decide if the first event happened before or after the second event. Each correct answer is worth one point and whoever had the most point after 7 questions would become the new Head of Household. Renee answered all of the question correct and received a perfect score, making her the new Head of Household.

On Day 49, Renee received a task in needing to complete 3 dares to win 5000 Wendy's points to all of the house guest. Renee failed the 3rd task. However, because of her effort, all house guest had won the Wendy's points. Later, Renee nominated Anika and Ty, with the latter as her target.

On Day 50, everyone except for Renee and Claudia competed in the Power of Veto competition.

- PoV Competition ("Winners Moment"): One at a time, the house guest needs to search for puzzle pieces in 5 different rooms. In each room however, there is a temptation that can slow them down. Once all of the pieces have been found, they need to solve the puzzle using the pieces that they found. With a time of 18:49, Ty was victorious, beating Daniel's time by 4 seconds.

On Day 52, Ty used the veto to save himself. Renee then nominated Kuzie as the replacement nominee. On Day 55, Kuzie was evicted in a 3-1 vote, with Ty voting to evict Anika. She became the fifth member of the jury.

Moment after Kuzie's eviction, Arisa informed the other house guest about the double eviction.

- HoH Competition ("BB Crime Scene"): The house guest looked at a crime scene with past house guest in which they need to answer True or False questions. Each correct answers is worth 1 point and the most points will be the new Head of Household. Claudia was the only one to answer the last question correct and scored 5 out of 7, making her the new Head of Household.

Claudia immediately nominated Anika and Daniel for eviction. Then, everyone but Claudia competed for the Power of Veto.

- PoV Competition ("Smash Pots"): House guest needs to grab one pot and smash it in the smash zone in hopes to find a puzzle piece. Once all 5 pieces are found, they then need to solve a puzzle with the first one completing it and hitting the buzzer winning the veto. Ty won.

Ty decided to use the Power of Veto on Anika. With a hard and emotional decision, Claudia decided to name Shanaya as the replacement nominee. Moments later, Shanaya was evicted in a 2-1 vote, with Renee voting to evict Daniel. She became the sixth member of the jury.

Week 9
Following the Double eviction, the House guest competed in the next Head of Household.
- HoH Competition ("Take it or Lever"): The house guest needs to put one foot on a sea saw in order to balance the HOH statues. If the house guest drops the HOH statute, then they are eliminated and the last one standing becomes the new Head of Household. Anika was victorious after a short 17 second battle.

On Day 56, Anika nominated Claudia and Renee for eviction, with Claudia as her main target.

- PoV Competition ("SharkNinja"): The house guest competed one at a time. They first need to memorize a cleaning list with 10 items. They then go into the Shark's cordless vacuum to search for the items. However, bringing the wrong item will incurred a 2 minute time penalty. Finally, they need to solve a puzzle with the fastest time winning the Power of Veto and a $5000 cash prize from SharkNinja. With a time of 13:42, Ty got his 5th Veto win, the most ever in BBCan History.

On Day 58, Ty decided to use the Power of Veto on Claudia and Daniel was nominated by default as he was the only one eligible to be put on the block. Then the house guest were put on slop. Later season 9 legend Spicy V entered the Manor to host a Wendy's auction. The house guest bid on various items and the points that they have earned throughout the season is their currency. On Day 60, Claudia voted for Daniel, while Ty voted for Renee which ended in a tie. Then HOH Anika broke the tie by evicting Renee, making her the seventh member of the jury.

Week 10 (Finale)
Following Renee's eviction, the remaining house guest, competed in the penultimate Head of Household.
- HoH Competition ("Dazed and Confused"): The house guest will hear questions from different days. Then using the number cards, they need to figure out which day is it on. Every correct answer is worth 1 point and whoever has the most point will be the new Head of Household. Ty answered all questions correct, making him the next Head of Household and granting him a spot in the final 3.

On Day 61, The house guest got styled for the BBCan Awards where they watched some memorable moments of the season in the BBCan Manor. Then Ty nominated Claudia and Daniel for eviction.

- PoV Competition ("BBCan Motel"): The House guest needs to search for hidden keys with faces of this season's house guest. Once all of the keys have been found, they would need to place the keys that is corresponding to the clues. Once correct, they can head to the roof to escape the motel. Whichever house guest can escape the fastest will win the final Power of Veto and earn a spot in the final 3. With a time of 48:40, Claudia won the final Power of Veto and earned a spot in the spot in the final 3.

On Day 63, Claudia used the Power of Veto on herself and Anika was named the replacement nominee. Then with her sole vote, Claudia cast her vote to evict Anika, making her the eighth member of the jury. Following the eviction, the remaining 3 house guest prepared for the final Head of Household competition which is split into 3 parts.

- Final HoH Competition Part 1 ("Ariel's Secret Underwater Grotto"): The house guest first need to study a diagram in which how the coins will be stacked, then they need to search for the coins and bring it back two at a time. There, they need to stack them as stated in the diagram. At the same time, they need to hold onto a rope that spins the plate that could cause it to fall, forcing them to start all over. Whoever can stack 30 coins without toppling will win and go straight to Part 3 of the final Head of Household along with receiving tickets for the movie premier of "The Little Mermaid." Claudia won.
- Final HoH Competition Part 2 ("Hands of Time"): The House guest will read a skill testing questions with 12 possible answers. There, they need to guide the ball to the correct slot. Once correct, they will receive the next question and whoever completes the questions the fastest will advance to Part 3 of the final Head of Household. Ty won and will faceoff against Claudia in the final part.
- Final HoH Competition Part 3 ("Jury Questions"): The House guest are asked a series of questions based on the members of the jury. Every correct answer is worth 1 point and whoever has the most point at the end will become the final Head of Household. Claudia was named the final Head of Household and secured a spot in the final 2.

On Day 69, Claudia cast her sole vote to evict Daniel, making him the ninth and final member of the jury. Before the reading of the vote, Canada's favourite house guest was announced as Jonathan and earned him $10,000. At the end of the finale, In a vote of 8-1, Ty was named the winner of Big Brother Canada Season 11 which comes with $100,000 cash, $10,000 towards a new wardrobe from Winners and $10,000 worth of Shark and Ninja products. While Claudia was named the runner up, only receiving Shanaya's vote and received $20,000.

== Episodes ==
No. overall	No. in season	Title	Day(s)	Original release date
Week 1
276	1	Episode 1	Day 1	March 8, 2023
277	2	Episode 2	Days 1–3	March 9, 2023
Week 2
278	3	Episode 3	TBA	March 14, 2023
279	4	Episode 4	TBA	March 15, 2023
280	5	Episode 5	TBA	March 16, 2023
Week 3
281	6	Episode 6	TBA	March 21, 2023
282	7	Episode 7	TBA	March 22, 2023
283	8	Episode 8	TBA	March 23, 2023
Week 4
284	9	Episode 9	TBA	March 28, 2023
285	10	Episode 10	TBA	March 29, 2023
286	11	Episode 11	TBA	March 30, 2023
Week 5
287	12	Episode 12	TBA	April 4, 2023
288	13	Episode 13	TBA	April 5, 2023
289	14	Episode 14	TBA	April 6, 2023
Week 6
290	15	Episode 15	TBA	April 11, 2023
291	16	Episode 16	TBA	April 12, 2023
292	17	Episode 17	TBA	April 13, 2023
Week 7
293	18	Episode 18	TBA	April 18, 2023
294	19	Episode 19	TBA	April 19, 2023
295	20	Episode 20	TBA	April 20, 2023
Week 8
296	21	Episode 21	TBA	April 25, 2023
297	22	Episode 22	TBA	April 26, 2023
298	23	Episode 23	TBA	April 27, 2023
Week 9
299	24	Episode 24	TBA	May 2, 2023
300	25	Episode 25	TBA	May 3, 2023
301	26	Episode 26	TBA	May 4, 2023
Week 10
302	27	Episode 27	TBA	May 9, 2023
303	28	Episode 28	TBA	May 10, 2023
304	29	Episode 29	TBA	May 11, 2023

== Voting history ==
Summary of the HouseGuests' votes and nominations
	Weeks 1-2	Week 3	Week 4	Week 5	Week 6	Week 7		Week 8		Week 9	Week 10		
	Weeks 1-2	Week 3	Week 4	Week 5	Week 6	Day 42	Day 43	Day 49	Day 55	Week 9	Day 61	Day 69	Finale
Head of Household	Santina	Dan	Kuzie	Santina	Ty	Kuzie	Claudia	Renee	Claudia	Anika	Ty	Claudia	(none)
Nominations (pre-veto)	Anika; Dan; **Renee**	Hope; Renee	Hope; Santina; ~~Vanessa~~	Dan; Ty	Hope; Renee	**Renee**; **Santina**	Hope; Ty	Anika; Ty	Anika; Daniel	Claudia; Renee	Claudia; Daniel	Daniel; Ty	(none)
Veto Winner	Ty	Zach	Hope	Daniel	Shanaya	(none)	Ty	Ty	Ty	Ty	Claudia	(none)	(none)
Nominations (post-veto)	Dan; John Michael; **Renee**	Renee; Roberto	Santina; Zach	Claudia; Dan	Hope; Jonathan	(none)	Hope; Kuzie	Anika; Kuzie	Daniel; Shanaya	Daniel; Renee	Anika; Daniel	(none)	(none)
Ty	John Michael	Roberto	No voting	Dan	Head of Household	Santina	Kuzie	Anika	Shanaya	Renee	Head of Household	Nominated	**Winner** (Day 69)
Claudia	John Michael	Roberto	No voting	Nominated	Hope	Santina	Head of Household	Kuzie	Head of Household	Daniel	Anika	Daniel	**Runner-up** (Day 69)
Daniel	John Michael	Roberto	No voting	Dan	Jonathan	Santina	Hope	Kuzie	Nominated	Nominated	Nominated	Evicted (Day 69)	Ty
Anika	John Michael	Roberto	No voting	Dan	Jonathan	Santina	Hope	Nominated	Shanaya	Renee	Nominated	Evicted (Day 63)	Ty
Renee	Nominated	Nominated	No voting	Dan	Hope	Nominated	Hope	Head of Household	Daniel	Nominated	Evicted (Day 60)		Ty
Shanaya	John Michael	Roberto	No voting	Dan	Hope	Santina	Hope	Kuzie	Nominated	Evicted (Day 55)			Claudia
Kuzie	John Michael	Roberto	Head of Household	Dan	Jonathan	Head of Household	Nominated	Nominated	Evicted (Day 55)				Ty
Hope	John Michael	Renee	Not eligible	Dan	Nominated	Santina	Nominated	Evicted (Day 48)					Ty
Santina	Head of Household	Renee	Nominated	Head of Household	Jonathan	Nominated	Evicted (Day 42)						Ty
Jonathan	John Michael	Renee	No voting	Dan	Nominated	Evicted (Day 41)							Ty
Dan	Nominated	Head of Household	No voting	Nominated	Evicted (Day 34)								Ty
Zach	John Michael	Roberto	Nominated	Walked (Day 26)									
Vanessa	John Michael	Renee	~~Nominated~~	Walked (Day 22)									
Roberto	John Michael	Nominated	Evicted (Day 20)										
John Michael	Nominated	Evicted (Day 13)											
Amal	Walked (Day 4)												
Notes	1, 2, 3	none	3, 4, 5, 6	5, 7	3	8	none		9	none			10
Walked	**Amal**	none	**Vanessa**, **Zach**	none									
Evicted	**John Michael**; 11 of 11 votes to evict	**Roberto**; 7 of 11 votes to evict	Eviction cancelled	**Dan**; 8 of 8 votes to evict	**Jonathan**; 4 of 7 votes to evict	**Santina**; 6 of 6 votes to evict	**Hope**; 4 of 5 votes to evict	**Kuzie**; 3 of 4 votes to evict	**Shanaya**; 2 of 3 votes to evict	**Renee**; 2 of 3 votes to evict	**Anika**; Claudia’s choice to evict	**Daniel**; Claudia’s choice to evict	**Claudia**; 1 vote to win
Evicted	**John Michael**; 11 of 11 votes to evict	**Roberto**; 7 of 11 votes to evict	Eviction cancelled	**Dan**; 8 of 8 votes to evict	**Jonathan**; 4 of 7 votes to evict	**Santina**; 6 of 6 votes to evict	**Hope**; 4 of 5 votes to evict	**Kuzie**; 3 of 4 votes to evict	**Shanaya**; 2 of 3 votes to evict	**Renee**; 2 of 3 votes to evict	**Anika**; Claudia’s choice to evict	**Daniel**; Claudia’s choice to evict	**Ty**; 8 votes to win

Notes

- **^Note 1**: The House Guest that placed last in the first Head of Household competition was automatically nominated as the Dead Last Nominee and is denoted in **Bold**.
- **^Note 2**: On Day 4, Amal walked from the game for personal reasons.
- **^Note 3**: The House Guest noted by was awarded the immunity by Canada.
- **^Note 4**: On Day 22, Vanessa walked from the game due to an undisclosed medical issue. As Vanessa was nominated, Head of Household Kuzie had to nominate a replacement nominee. She nominated Hope.
- **^Note 5**: As punishment for sneaking in contraband (a personal letter, placed among his socks from his girlfriend) from the outside world into the house, Hope was not eligible to vote in Week 4's Eviction prior to its cancellation (see note 6), and he was unable to compete for Head of Household in week 5.
- **^Note 6**: On Day 26, Zach walked from the game after being upset that Hope was not expelled for sneaking in contraband (see note 5). His exit resulted in the cancellation of Week 4's Eviction.
- **^Note 7**: Week 5 is Whodunit week. All competition winners were anonymous.
- **^Note 8**: On Day 42, the House Guests were surprised by the Fatal Feast, during which an Instant Eviction occurred. During the feast, the House Guests participated in a Chain of Safety to determine the Nominees. Starting with the reigning Head of Household, each House Guest would select another House Guest to save until three remained. The three House Guests left unselected competed in a safety challenge, with the winner (indicated by ) saving themselves from Eviction. The two remaining House Guests were the final nominees and faced the House's Vote.
- **^Note 9**: This week was a double eviction week. Following the first eviction, the remaining HouseGuests played a week's worth of games, including Head of Household and Veto competitions and Nomination, Veto and Eviction ceremonies, during the remainder of the live show, culminating in a second eviction for the night.
- **^Note 10**: The Jury voted to crown the winner of Big Brother Canada 11.

== Production ==
=== Development ===
Arisa Cox
(@arisacox)
tweeted:

Big Brother Canada Season 11. Confirmed. Spring 2023. That’s it, that’s the tweet. #BBCAN11 @BigBrotherCA

June 9, 2022

The eleventh season was produced by Insight Productions, in association with Corus Entertainment and Banijay. The season was first announced on June 8, 2022, at the Corus upfronts for the 2022–23 Canadian network television schedule. A press release for the show's renewal confirmed that Arisa Cox would return as a host and as an executive producer. Executive producers John Brunton, Erin Brock and Eric Abboud were also confirmed to be returning for the season. Casting began on August 8, 2022, with Kassting Inc. returning to provide casting services for the show. Online applications opened upon the start of casting and closed on November 11, 2022; the cast was announced on March 1, 2023. On February 6, 2023, it was announced that the season would premiere on March 8, 2023.

While premiere and all weekly eviction episodes took place behind closed doors, live audiences returned for the first time since Big Brother Canada 8 for the season finale.

=== Twists ===
==== Dead Last Nomination ====
In Week 2, the HouseGuest who placed last in the Head of Household competition was automatically nominated as the Dead Last Nominee. After the pair of Renee and Shanaya came in last place during the HoH competition, they faced off in a second competition in which the loser would automatically become a third nominee for the week. Renee lost the competition, and therefore became the Dead Last Nominee for the week. While the Dead Last Nominee could not pick a player for the Power of Veto competition, they could still be taken off the block if the Veto is used on them. If the Dead Last Nominee is removed from the block, the HoH would then have to still choose a replacement nominee.

==== Belairdirect Eviction Protection Insurance ====
Occasionally throughout the season, Canada would vote for one HouseGuest to earn the Belairdirect Eviction Protection Insurance. The HouseGuest who receives the most votes would be immune from that week's eviction. The voter mmay vote for multiple HouseGuests with no vote limits being imposed. Once that HouseGuest earns immunity, they would not be eligible again to receive this immunity for the rest of the season. This immunity was sponsored by BelAirDirect.

- On Day 1, it was announced that the viewers would be voting to decide which HouseGuest would receive immunity from nominations for Week 2. On Day 6, Claudia received the most votes and was awarded the immunity.
- On Day 20, it was announced that the viewers would be voting to decide which HouseGuest would receive immunity from nominations for Week 4. Jonathan received the most votes and received the immunity.
- On Day 34, it was announced that the viewers would be voting to decide which HouseGuest would receive immunity from nominations for Week 6. Santina received the most votes and received the immunity.

==== Wendy's Rewards Points ====
In the seasons run, the HouseGuests will be able to earn Wendy's Rewards points through various means, including becoming a Head of Household; winning the Power of Veto; being selected by the HoH for breakfast, surviving an eviction as a nominee; or completing a week of the game, among others. When a HouseGuest is evicted, they must bequeath their remaining points to a HouseGuest still in the game. On Day 58, it was revealed that the points would be spent at an Auction, during which the Final 5 HouseGuests could buy rewards, calls and letters from home and game advantages.

Summary of the progression of the Wendy's Rewards Points
Contestant	Weeks 1–2		Week 3		Week 4		Week 5		Week 6		Week 7		Week 8		Week 9	
Contestant	Start	End	Start	End	Start	End	Start	End	Start	End	Start	End	Start	End	Start	End
Ty	500	850		1,725		1,825		1,925		2,525		2,975		8,675	30,375	20,000
Claudia	500	600		1,600		1,700		1,950		2,200		2,900		8,600	18,275	11,175
Daniel	500	600		2,050		2,300		2,400		2,500		2,700		8,050		0
Anika	500	600		1,550		1,650		1,750		1,850		2,050		7,550		3,650
Renee	500	750		1,800		1,900		2,000		2,100		2,450		8,150		6,650
Shanaya	500	600		1,500		1,600		1,700	3,875	4,225		4,575		~~9,675~~		
Kuzie	500	600	1,250	1,750		2,350		2,450		7,750		10,625	16,700	~~21,700~~		
Hope	500	600		1,925		2,275		2,375		2,725	~~6,075~~					
Santina	500	1,100		1,775		2,025		2,125		~~2,225~~						
Jonathan	500	600		1,400	3,150	3,250		~~3,350~~								
Dan	500	750		2,075		~~2,175~~										
Zach	500	600		~~1,700~~												
Vanessa	500	600		~~1,075~~												
Roberto	500	600		~~1,750~~												
John Michael	500	~~650~~														

==== Whodunit Week ====
Similar to the Invisible HoH twist of season 9, all competition winners for the week will not be announced. All decisions were made in the Diary Room, before being displayed on screen during the ceremonies.

Additionally, to disguise the Anonymous HoH, they were eligible to compete for the Power of Veto if they were drawn and could compete the following week to be HoH; however, they did not have access to the HoH Suite.

==== Fatal Feast ====
Week 6 included an Instant Eviction, which occurred at a surprise feast for the HouseGuests that was revealed to be a Fatal Feast. The game structure for the Fatal Feast Eviction operated similarly to the Chain of Safety twist from season 10, with the nominations being determined by a "Chain of Safety" selection process. Beginning with Kuzie, as reigning Head of Household, each HouseGuest would select another HouseGuest to save until three were left unselected. The remaining three would then compete for safety in a second challenge to determine that night's set of nominees who would face the House's vote.

	Fatal Feast
Head of Household	Kuzie
1	Hope
2	Anika
3	Daniel
4	Shanaya
5	Claudia
Safety Challenge	Ty
Nominated	Renee; Santina

==== Other twists ====
- During Week 1, there was no eviction, and the first eviction was held during Week 2 instead.

=== Prizes ===
In addition to the main C$100,000 cash prize, the winner, as decided by a jury of evicted HouseGuests, will win an additional C$10,000 provided by Winners intended for new clothing, and C$10,000 worth of SharkNinja products. Meanwhile, the runner-up receives C$20,000 and the HouseGuest voted as Canada's Favourite HouseGuest receives $10,000.

Additional prizes were also offered during select challenges held during the seasons.

=== Production design ===
On February 27, Global released images of the HoH room, foyer, diary room, and the bathroom of the new house, billed as the Big Brother Canada Manor. The house is built with hidden passageways and hidden twists "designed to stroke paranoia in the house".

=== Digital Dailies ===
On February 23, it was announced that the show's 24/7 live feeds will be replaced with "Digital Dailies", featuring uncut footage from the house that will be published weekly on the show's website. The move received backlash online. Lorraine Palinkas of ScreenRant described the elimination of the 24/7 live feeds in lieu of the "Digital Dailies" as "surprising", while commenting that "it seems that production felt that the feeds were doing more harm than good".

== Reception ==
The season received a mixed to negative reception from viewers and critics alike. Lee Whitten of ScreenRant deemed the season as a "very weak" installment for the show, citing the "unlikable presence" of the eventual winner, Ty, and the "weak overall gameplay" seen on the show. Whitten added that the elimination of live feeds "doomed" the season from the start.
