= Big Brother Canada season 6 =

Big Brother Canada
- Season 6
- Big Brother Canada 6 title card
- Presented by: Arisa Cox
- No. of days: 69
- No. of houseguests: 16
- Winner: Paras Atashnak
- Runner-up: Kaela Grant
- Companion shows: Big Brother Canada: After Dark; Big Brother: After the Eviction
- No. of episodes: 29

Release
- Original network: Global
- Original release: March 7 – May 10, 2018

Additional information
- Filming dates: March 3 – May 10, 2018

Season chronology
- ← Previous; Season 5 Next → Season 7

Big Brother Canada 6 is the sixth season of the Canadian reality television series Big Brother Canada.The series began filming on March 3, 2018 and premiered on March 7, 2018 on Global. Hosted by Arisa Cox, the show revolved around sixteen contestants (known as HouseGuests), who volunteered in reside in a house under constant surveillance and without any communication with the outside world as they compete to win a grand prize of CA$100,000.

The season concluded on May 10, 2018 following 69 days of competition. The season was won by Paras Atashnak, who defeated Kaela Grant by a 6-1 jury vote. Their respective advancements to the finale marked the first time in the show's history that both the winner and the runner-up were women. The finale was watched by 1.248 million viewers.

== HouseGuests ==
The cast of the sixth season of Big Brother Canada. Top: William Middle: Olivia, Merron, Andrew, Ryan, Hamza, Derek, Jesse, and Erica Bottom: Johnny, Alejandra, Kaela, Arisa (host), Paras, Maddy, Rozina and Veronica

Name	Age	Occupation	Residence	Entry	Result
Paras Atashnak	23	Law student	Port Coquitlam, British Columbia	1	Winner; Day 69
Kaela Grant	25	Wine ambassador	Saint John, New Brunswick	1	Runner-up; Day 69
Derek Kesseler	27	Entrepreneur	Beaumont, Alberta	1	Evicted; Day 69
Will Kenny	25	Oil field technician	Trepassey, Newfoundland	1	Evicted; Day 64
Madeline "Maddy" Poplett	25	Bartender	Ottawa, Ontario	1	Evicted; Day 62
Johnny Mulder	28	House husband	Victoria, British Columbia	1	Evicted; Day 55
Olivia Riemer	21	Student	Guelph, Ontario	1	Evicted; Day 55
Alejandra Martinez	30	Personal trainer	Vancouver, British Columbia	1	Evicted; Day 55
Ryan Ballantine	39	Fire safety technician	Calgary, Alberta	1	Evicted; Day 48
Erica Hill	23	Server	Pickering, Ontario	1	Evicted; Day 41
Merron Haile (Note: Merron and Veronica were voted into the house by Canada.)	22	Business student	Edmonton, Alberta	6	Evicted; Day 34
Hamza Hatoum	27	Soccer coach	Thunder Bay, Ontario	1	Evicted; Day 27
Veronica Doherty	24	Server & Student	Ottawa, Ontario	6	Evicted; Day 27
Jesse Larson	24	Sales executive	Saskatoon, Saskatchewan	1	Evicted; Day 20
Andrew Miller	36	Small business owner	Toronto, Ontario	1	Evicted; Day 13
Rozina Yaqub	49	Religious educator	Toronto, Ontario	1	Evicted; Day 6

=== Former Potential HouseGuests ===
Four potential HouseGuests were unveiled on February 25, 2018. The viewers could vote for one man and one woman to enter the House as the fifteenth and sixteenth HouseGuests. These two lost the public vote and did not enter the Big Brother Canada 6 house.

Name	Age	Occupation	Residence
Kirsten MacInnis	25	University housing coordinator	Calgary, Alberta
Michael "Mikey" Jacobczak	33	Real estate agent	Toronto, Ontario

== Summary ==
On Day 1, Erica, Hamza, Kaela, William, Alejandra, Andrew, Rozina, Johnny, Olivia, Jesse, Paras, Ryan, Maddy and Derek entered the House. A twist shortly after forced Andrew to select seven HouseGuests to live in Hell for the first week; only these HouseGuests could compete for Head of Household and be nominated for eviction, whilst those living in Heaven were immune. He chose to send Alejandra, Johnny, Kaela, Maddy, Paras, Rozina, and Will to Hell, where they competed in the Feel the Burn Head of Household competition. In this endurance competition, HouseGuests had to hold on to rocks connected to an adjacent wall which tilted forwards and backwards at several intervals during the game. If a HouseGuest fell off the wall, they were eliminated. Johnny was the last HouseGuest standing, and he therefore became the new Head of Household. On Day 2, Johnny nominated Alejandra and Rozina for eviction. Derek, Paras, Kaela, and Jesse formed the "Real Deal" alliance. On Day 3, Johnny, Alejandra, and Rozina, as well as Hamza, Olivia, and Jesse, squirmed in the Game of Inches Power of Veto competition. In this competition, HouseGuests must crawl along their lane, take an egg and carry it along their lane. At the five inch mark, they may no longer use their hands to transport the egg. They must move their egg into one of the five holes at the end of their lane. Each HouseGuest also has one golden egg. If a HouseGuest lands a golden egg, they will freeze their opponents for thirty seconds. The first HouseGuest to land an egg in all five holes will win the Power of Veto. Johnny was the winner. On Day 4, Johnny decided not to use the Power of Veto. On Day 6, Rozina was evicted by an 11-0 vote. Immediately following Rozina's eviction, Arisa revealed the Gate Crashers twist to the HouseGuests. Merron and Veronica were revealed to have won Canada's vote and entered the House. They were given immunity for one week.

Following Rozina's eviction and Merron and Veronica's entrance, the HouseGuests splashed in the Right in the Kisser Head of Household competition. Before the competition, HouseGuests filled out a first impressions survey of each other in private. The HouseGuests will be read a question, and the first HouseGuest to buzz in will head to the bar with their martini glass. They must then throw their drink in the face of the HouseGuest they believe is the correct answer. If they are correct, they can choose a HouseGuest to eliminate. If they are incorrect, they will be eliminated. The last HouseGuest standing will be the new Head of Household. Ryan was the winner. As Head of Household, Ryan was required to name four Have-Nots for the week. Derek, Erica, Hamza, and Jesse became Have-Nots for the week. On Day 7, Ryan nominated Andrew and Hamza for eviction, with the plan to backdoor Olivia. On Day 8, Ryan, Andrew, and Hamza, alongside Johnny, Jesse, and Erica, scrapped in the Tomb Raider Power of Veto competition. In this competition, HouseGuests must first untie themselves from their pole. Afterwards, they must use their bow and arrow to knock off their first puzzle piece. They must then climb over the wall and search the jungle for the rest of their pieces. They can bring only one puzzle piece back at a time. They must then use their pieces to assemble their pyramid puzzle. When completed, the puzzle will reveal a code to unlock the Tomb of the Mother of Death. The first HouseGuest to unlock the tom will win the Power of Veto, as well as an advanced screening of "Tomb Raider" and $5000. Erica was the winner. On Day 10, Erica decided not to use the Power of Veto. The House began to divide based on where everyone was sleeping, with the Red Room of Alejandra, Derek, Erica, Jesse, Johnny, Kaela, Merron and Olivia against the White Room of Andrew, Hamza, Maddy, Paras, Ryan, Veronica, and Will. At the live eviction, Arisa revealed the Gate Crashers Merron and Veronica were ineligible to vote. On Day 13, Andrew was evicted by a 10-0 vote.

Following Andrew's eviction, the HouseGuests paired up for the Handle with Care Head of Household competition. Before the competition, HouseGuests had a random draw to determine their partner. As Erica was the odd one out, she earned immunity for the week. In this competition, HouseGuests must work together, while in their individual crates, to transport fruit from one end of the yard to the other. One HouseGuest must pass the fruit to their partner halfway, who will then deposit the fruit into their tray. The first team to transfer all of their fruit will win the competition, and they will decide who between them will be the new Head of Household. Hamza and Veronica were the winners, and Hamza became the new Head of Household. The showmances Derek/Kaela, Will/Veronica, Jesse/Paras, and Erica/Merron tested how well they knew each other in the Will You Showmance? Have-Not competition. In this competition, one person of each pair would answer a question in private. Their partner would then be asked the same question, trying to match their partner's answer. If they match, they will earn one point. The two pairs with the fewest points will be Have-Nots for the week. Derek, Erica, Kaela, and Merron became Have-Nots for the week. On Day 14, Hamza nominated Jesse and Olivia for eviction. On Day 15, Hamza, Jesse, and Olivia, joined by Derek, Ryan, and Erica, freshened up in the Fresh off the Block Power of Veto competition, sponsored by Wendy's. In this competition, HouseGuests must walk across their balance beams to their freeze. They must then break open an ice block from the freezer to retrieve a ball. They must then walk back across their balance beam to their garden. They can then attempt to knock down one of their targets. After they knock down four targets, they can attempt to search their garden for a key which unlocks a larger tool to help break the ice. The first HouseGuest to knock down all of their targets will win the Power of Veto, as well as $5000. Hamza was the winner. On Day 17, Hamza decided not to use the Power of Veto. On Day 18, the HouseGuests were given the task to clean the House, but also dance when music played. The HouseGuests completed their task and won food from "Skip the Dishes". On Day 20, Jesse was evicted by a 9-2 vote, with Derek and Veronica voting to evict Olivia.

Following Jesse's eviction, the HouseGuests recalled in the Night in the BBCAN Museum Head of Household competition. The day before the competition, the HouseGuests had the opportunity to view three exhibits from memorable moments in "Big Brother Canada" history. HouseGuests were asked a series of questions about the exhibits. An incorrect answer resulted in elimination. The last HouseGuest standing will be the new Head of Household. Erica was the winner. On Day 21, Erica nominated Maddy and Merron for eviction. On Day 22, Erica, Maddy, Merron, Olivia, Alejandra, and Ryan fished in the Fisherman's Barf Power of Veto competition. In the first round, each HouseGuest will be connected to a fishing line wrapped around a series of posts. While attached to one end of the line, they must climb over, under, and around the posts in order to untangle the line. The first three to untangle their fishing line and ring their bell will move on to the final round. Olivia, Erica, and Maddy moved on to the final round. For the final round, they must each roll over their fishing pole in order to reel in their fish. The first HouseGuest to reel in their fish will win the Power of Veto. Erica was the winner. On Day 24, Erica decided to take Maddy off the block, and named Veronica as the replacement nominee. On Day 25, Cassandra from Big Brother Canada 4 & 5 surprised the HouseGuests for a task. The guys were required to give the girls an '80s-themed makeover. However, the guys were also secretly given the task to give the worst makeover possible. The best pair will win a $2000 cash prize and a year's supply of "L'Oreal" hair care products, as well as a special dinner. Veronica and Johnny won the task. Just before the Live Eviction, Arisa informed the HouseGuests of the Double Eviction. On Day 27, Veronica was evicted by a 9-1 vote, with Will voting to evict Merron. The HouseGuests then faced off in the One, Two, Three Head of Household competition. In this competition, HouseGuests played in a series of head-to-head matches. They were asked a question about the season's events. The answer will either be one, two, or three. The first HouseGuest to buzz in with the correct answer will advance and eliminate their opponent. If they are incorrect, they will be eliminated and their opponent will advance. If nobody buzzes in, they will both be eliminated unless they are the final two. The survivor of the match will then select the next two HouseGuests to face off. The last HouseGuest standing will be the new Head of Household. Olivia was the winner. She immediately nominated Merron and Ryan for eviction. Afterwards, Olivia, Merron, and Ryan, plus Alejandra, Hamza, and Paras, bounced in the Big Brother Pinball Power of Veto competition. In this competition, each HouseGuest has their own board with two balls and five targets. They must slide their balls down their board, trying to knock down their targets. The first HouseGuest to knock down all of their targets will win the Power of Veto. Ryan was the winner. At the Veto Meeting, Ryan took himself off the block, and Olivia named Hamza as the replacement nominee. On Day 27, Hamza was evicted by an 8-1 vote, with Erica voting to evict Merron.

Following Veronica and Hamza's evictions, the HouseGuests were hung over in the About Last Night Head of Household competition. In this competition, HouseGuests were asked true-false questions based on the party they had the previous night. An incorrect answer resulted in elimination. The last HouseGuest standing will be the new Head of Household. Erica was the winner. For being the first four eliminated during the Head of Household competition, Alejandra, Kaela, and Merron became Have-Nots for the week. Since there was a tie for the last Have-Not, Erica selected Johnny to join them. On Day 28, Erica nominated Merron and Ryan for eviction, with Merron as the target. On Day 29, Erica, Merron, and Ryan, beside Alejandra, Maddy, and Johnny, delivered in the Delivering the Goods Power of Veto competition. In this competition, HouseGuests must deliver a series of ten various restaurant orders to various homes. However, the orders are made more difficult by leaving out key information, which they must figure out themselves. The HouseGuest who completes the ten orders in the fastest time will win the Power of Veto, as well as a $5000 "Skip the Dishes" gift card. Johnny was the winner. On Day 31, Johnny decided not to use the Power of Veto. On Day 34, Merron was evicted in a 5-3 vote, with Alejandra, Derek, and Kaela voting to evict Ryan. After the eviction, Arisa revealed to Canada within the next two weeks, they could vote to save a nominee after the veto is used, or not to use the power. If it is not used in the coming week, it carries over to the week after. If it still isn't used, the twist ends.

Following Merron's eviction, the HouseGuests stuck it out in the Buttoned Up Head of Household competition. In this competition, HouseGuests must hold their arm above their head, holding down their button with their hand. Throughout the competition, HouseGuests will be offered temptations to drop out. If they release their button, they will be eliminated. The last HouseGuest standing will be the new Head of Household. Paras won $1000, Derek won immunity for the week, and Will won a phone call from home. Kaela became the new Head of Household. On Day 35, Kaela nominated Ryan and Will for eviction. On Day 36, Kaela, Ryan, and Will, connected with Erica, Derek, and Johnny, flew in the Globetrotting Power of Veto competition. In the first round of the competition, the HouseGuests must place champagne flutes on their tray, loop around their table, and stack their flutes on the table in a pyramid. If they drop any of their glasses, they must start over. The first four HouseGuests to stack their glasses will move on to the next round. Ryan, Erica, Johnny, and Kaela moved on to the second round. In the second round, HouseGuests must move a peg through a maze. The first two HouseGuests to release their peg will move on to the final round. Johnny and Ryan moved on to the final round. In the final round, HouseGuests must smash their pots to find puzzle pieces. If they smash a pot with black sand, they will receive a time penalty. The first HouseGuest to solve their puzzle will win the Power of Veto, as well as a trip for two to London. Johnny was the winner. On Day 38, Johnny decided not to use the Power of Veto. On Day 39, the HouseGuests were given the task to prepare lettuce and tomatoes for 100 salads. The team who completes their salads first will earn themselves a Wendy's dinner and videos from home. However, Olivia was given a secret mission to take a shower, take a nap, and eat a salad during the task. If she succeeds, everyone will win the dinner and the videos. She passed her mission and everyone earned the dinner and videos. At the Live Eviction, Arisa revealed the "Canada's Save" Twist. Canada decided to take Ryan off the block. Kaela nominated Erica in his place. On Day 41, Erica was evicted by a 5-2 vote, with Johnny and Ryan voting to evict Will.

Following Erica's eviction, the HouseGuests recollected in the Before or After Head of Household competition. In this competition, HouseGuests were read a series of events from the season. They must determine whether the first event took place before or after the second event. An incorrect answer resulted in elimination. The last HouseGuest standing will be the new Head of Household. Derek was the winner. On Day 42, the HouseGuests dribbled in the Buttsketball Have-Not competition. In this competition, HouseGuests must score as many baskets as they can. However, one team member is strapped to the back of their opponents' goal, with the freedom to turn their goal to make their opponents miss. The team with more baskets will be the Haves for the week, while the other team will be Have-Nots for the week. Alejandra, Kaela, Olivia, and Paras became Have-Nots for the week. On Day 42, Derek nominated Johnny and Ryan for eviction. On Day 43, Derek, Johnny, and Ryan selected Maddy, Paras, and Olivia to play in the Under Fire Power of Veto competition. In this competition, HouseGuests will first fire one shot at the target to determine their ranking. The HouseGuest with a shot closest to the bullseye will be ranked highest, the second closest HouseGuest the second highest, and so forth. In each round, the two lowest competitors will compete head-to-head to knock down their opponent's army. The winner of the match will eliminate their opponent, and move to the next round. The last HouseGuest standing will win the Power of Veto. Derek was the winner. On Day 45, Derek decided not to use the Power of Veto. On Day 46, Will discovered Marsha the Moose inside the Crypt in the Have-Not room. He received a secret mission to hold a "Screech In" for the entire House, including getting them to take a shot and kiss the cod. He has one hour to accomplish the task. If he passes, the House will receive a kitchen party. If he fails, the House will be on slop for the rest of the season. However, the rest of the HouseGuests were given the secret task to ensure Will fails his mission. The HouseGuests passed their task and the House received a kitchen party. On Day 48, Ryan was evicted by a 6-0 vote. He became the first member of the jury.

Following Ryan's eviction, the HouseGuests held strong in the Slippery Slope Head of Household competition. In this competition, HouseGuests must hold onto their rope, trying to stay on their candy for as long as possible. If they step off, they will be eliminated. The last HouseGuest standing will be the new Head of Household. Johnny was the winner. As Head of Household, Johnny was required to name two Have-Nots for the week. He selected Derek and Kaela. On Day 49, Johnny nominated Derek and Kaela for eviction. On Day 50, Johnny, Derek, and Kaela, alongside Alejandra, Maddy, and Paras, raced in the Downloaded Power of Veto competition. In each round of the competition, HouseGuests were asked a question about a series of images. They must watch the monitor to identify the correct images, run along the track, and place the images on their computer. The last HouseGuest to place the correct images in each round will be eliminated. The last HouseGuest standing will win the Power of Veto, as well as $5000. Derek was the winner. On Day 52, Derek decided to take himself off the block, and Johnny named Alejandra as the replacement nominee. On Day 55, Alejandra was evicted by a 4-1 vote, with Olivia voting to evict Kaela. She became the second member of the jury. Arisa then informed the HouseGuests of the Triple Eviction. The HouseGuests were then tested in the Name That Speech Head of Household competition. In this competition, HouseGuests were read a series of quotes made at a previous ceremony. They must identify who made the quote. An incorrect answer resulted in elimination. The last HouseGuest standing will be the new Head of Household. Derek was the winner. He immediately nominated Johnny, Maddy, and Olivia for eviction. Everyone except Derek then grappled in the Drawbridge to Veto Power of Veto competition. In this competition, each HouseGuest had a drawbridge with four missing planks. They must complete their drawbridge with four planks of the HouseGuests who have won Head of Household and the Power of Veto in the same week, with the earliest occurrence at the bottom. In order to release their planks, they must spin around their posts. The first HouseGuest to correctly complete their drawbridge, lower it, and hit their button will win the Power of Veto. Kaela was the winner. At the Veto Meeting, Kaela decided not to use the Power of Veto. On Day 55, Johnny and Olivia were evicted by a 3-0-0 vote. They became the third and fourth members of the jury.

Following Alejandra, Olivia, and Johnny's eviction, the HouseGuests sought a spot in the final four in the Previously on Big Brother Canada Head of Household competition. In this competition, HouseGuests were given a recap of a series of events pertaining to a specific week in the House. HouseGuests must identify who was Head of Household when those events took place. Each correct answer earned them one point. The HouseGuest with the most points will be the new Head of Household. Kaela was the winner. On Day 56, Kaela nominated Maddy and Paras for eviction. On Day 57, the HouseGuests were pinned in the Stick It to Me Power of Veto competition. In this competition, HouseGuests must stay on their voodoo doll, using their pins as support. Throughout the competition, a light bar will indicate what color of pin they must remove from their voodoo doll, making it more difficult. If a HouseGuest falls off their doll, or if they fail to pull out their pin in time, they will be eliminated. The last HouseGuest standing will win the Power of Veto. Kaela was the winner. On Day 58, Big Brother gave the two HouseGuests who were never Have-Nots, Maddy and Will, the task to chug a slop shake, take a 15-minute nap together on top of the Tomb, and take a 1-minute dip in the moat. If they succeed, the Have-Not Room will be closed for the season. They passed their task and closed the Have-Not Room. On Day 59, Kaela decided not to use the Power of Veto. On Day 62, Maddy was evicted by a 2-0 vote. She became the fifth member of the jury.

Following Maddy's eviction, the HouseGuests faced their past in the Legends of the Fallen Head of Household competition. In this competition, HouseGuests watched a monitor that will slowly reveal information about an evicted HouseGuest. They must identify which HouseGuest is being described. The first HouseGuest to buzz in with the correct answer will earn one point. The HouseGuest with the most points will be the new Head of Household. Paras was the winner. On Day 63, the HouseGuests attended the "Big Brother Canada Awards", where they had the opportunity to watch and reminisce with moments from the season. On Day 63, Paras nominated Kaela and Derek for eviction. On Day 64, the HouseGuests were mazed and confused in the Stuck in the Past final Power of Veto competition. In this competition, HouseGuests were blindfolded and must navigate their way through their maze, which is based on the floor design in the House. They must retrieve four bags, one at a time, and return them to the center. Throughout the maze are buttons that will trigger trivia questions read by evicted HouseGuests. Each possible answer will lead them a different direction. If they are correct, it will lead them to a bag. If they are incorrect, it will lead them to a dead end. Once they have all of their bags, they can use the numbers inside to answer a final series of questions. The HouseGuest who completes the maze in the fastest time will win the final Power of Veto of the season. Kaela was the winner. On Day 64, Kaela used the Power of Veto to take herself off the block, and Will was automatically named as the replacement nominee. On Day 64, Kaela cast the sole vote to evict Will. Immediately after Will's eviction, the HouseGuests each had the opportunity to have private talks with all of the previous "Big Brother Canada" winners to talk strategy about the end game.

Following Will's eviction, the HouseGuests engaged in their final battle in the Bribe the Beast Part 1 of the Final Head of Household competition. In this competition, HouseGuests must collect three coins, cross the river into the Underworld, and balance them on the pillars of the altar, placing them one at a time. If their coins fall, those coins are out of play. The first HouseGuest to balance twenty coins on each pillar will win Part 1 of the final Head of Household competition and advance to Part 3. Paras was the winner. Derek and Kaela then faced off in the Reach for the Stairs Part 2 of the Final Head of Household competition. In this competition, HouseGuests must complete a staircase based on information that applies to the HouseGuests. They must place their blocks so the HouseGuest showing applies to the information beneath it. The HouseGuest who correctly completes their staircase faster will win Part 2 and face Paras in Part 3. Kaela was the winner. Paras and Kaela had the final showdown in the Jury Questions Part 3 of the Final Head of Household competition. In this competition, HouseGuests were asked questions based on the members of the jury. A correct answer earned one point. The HouseGuest with more points after seven questions will become the final Head of Household of the season. Paras was the winner. On Day 69, Paras cast the sole vote to evict Derek. He became the seventh and final member of the jury. On Day 69, after receiving Ryan, Alejandra, Olivia, Johnny, Maddy, and Will's votes, Kaela was deemed the runner-up and walked away with $20,000, and Paras left the House with $100,000, a European dream vacation for two courtesy of Air Transat, a $30,000 home makeover from The Brick, and was deemed the winner of Big Brother Canada 6.

== Voting history ==
Color key:

Winner
Runner-up
Head of Household
Nominated for eviction
Immune from eviction
Votes to Save
Evicted
Entered the game

	Week 1	Week 2	Week 3	Week 4		Week 5	Week 6	Week 7	Week 8		Week 9	Week 10		
	Week 1	Week 2	Week 3	Day 21	Day 27 (Note: This week was a double eviction week. Following the first eviction, the remaining HouseGuests played a week's worth of games, including Head of Household and veto competitions, and nomination, veto and eviction ceremonies, during the live show, culminating in a second eviction for the week.)	Week 5	Week 6	Week 7	Day 49	Day 55 (Note: This week was a triple eviction week. Following the regular eviction, the remaining HouseGuests played a modified week's worth of games, including HoH and Veto competitions and their respective ceremonies during the remainder of the live show. The Head of Household was obliged to nominate three HouseGuests for eviction. Additionally, the voting HouseGuests would vote to save rather than to evict, with the HouseGuest with the most votes to save being the sole nominee surviving the vote for that cycle.)	Week 9	Day 63	Day 69	Finale
Head of Household	Johnny	Ryan	Hamza	Erica	Olivia	Erica	Kaela	Derek	Johnny	Derek	Kaela	Paras	Paras	(None)
Nominations (pre-veto)	Alejandra; Rozina	Andrew; Hamza	Jesse; Olivia	Maddy; Merron	Merron; Ryan	Merron; Ryan	Ryan; Will	Johnny; Ryan	Derek; Kaela	Johnny; Maddy; Olivia	Maddy; Paras	Derek; Kaela	Derek; Kaela	(None)
Veto Winner	Johnny	Erica	Hamza	Erica	Ryan	Johnny	Johnny	Derek	Derek	Kaela	Kaela	Kaela	(None)	(None)
Nominations (post-veto)	Alejandra; Rozina	Andrew; Hamza	Jesse; Olivia	Merron; Veronica	Hamza; Merron	Merron; Ryan	~~Ryan~~ (Note: Canada voted to save Ryan from eviction with 51% of Canada's Vote. Will received 36% and Not to Use the Power got 12%. Kaela nominated Erica in his place.); Will; Erica	Johnny; Ryan	Alejandra; Kaela	Johnny; Maddy; Olivia	Maddy; Paras	Derek; Will	(None)	(None)
Paras	Rozina	Andrew	Jesse	Veronica	Hamza	Merron	Erica	Ryan	Alejandra	Maddy	Nominated	Head of Household	Derek (Note: As Head of Household, Paras chose to evict Derek.)	Winner (Day 69)
Kaela	Rozina	Andrew	Jesse	Veronica	Hamza	Ryan	Head of Household	Ryan	Nominated	Maddy	Head of Household	Will	Nominated	Runner-up (Day 69)
Derek	Rozina (Note: The 7 HouseGuests sent to Heaven received Immunity from the first eviction.)	Andrew	Olivia	Veronica	Hamza	Ryan	Erica (Note: For dropping out of the Head of Household competition, Derek received Immunity for the week.)	Head of Household	Alejandra	Head of Household	Maddy	Nominated	Evicted (Day 69)	Kaela
Will	Rozina	Andrew	Jesse	Merron	Hamza	Merron	Nominated	Ryan	Alejandra	Maddy	Maddy	Nominated	Evicted (Day 64)	Paras
Maddy	Rozina	Andrew	Jesse	Veronica	Hamza	Merron	Erica	Ryan	Alejandra	Nominated	Nominated	Evicted (Day 62)		Paras
Johnny	Head of Household	Andrew	Jesse	Veronica	Hamza	Merron	Will	Nominated	Head of Household	Nominated	Evicted (Day 55)			Paras
Olivia	Rozina	Andrew	Nominated	Veronica	Head of Household	Merron	Erica	Ryan	Kaela	Nominated	Evicted (Day 55)			Paras
Alejandra	Nominated	Andrew	Jesse	Veronica	Hamza	Ryan	Erica	Ryan	Nominated	Evicted (Day 55)				Paras
Ryan	Rozina	Head of Household	Jesse	Veronica	Hamza	Nominated	Will	Nominated	Evicted (Day 48)					Paras
Erica	Rozina	Andrew	Jesse (Note: As Erica was left without a partner in the Head of Household competition, she received Immunity for the week.)	Head of Household	Merron	Head of Household	Nominated	Evicted (Day 41)						
Merron	Not in House	Exempt (Note: As new HouseGuests, Merron and Veronica were immune for the week and were not eligible to vote at the eviction ceremony.)	Jesse	Nominated	Nominated	Nominated	Evicted (Day 34)							
Hamza	Rozina	Nominated	Head of Household	Veronica	Nominated	Evicted (Day 27)								
Veronica	Not in House	Exempt	Olivia	Nominated	Evicted (Day 27)									
Jesse	Rozina	Andrew	Nominated	Evicted (Day 20)										
Andrew	Rozina	Nominated	Evicted (Day 13)											
Rozina	Nominated	Evicted (Day 6)												
Evicted	Rozina; 11 of 11 votes to evict	Merron, Veronica; Canada's choice to enter	Jesse; 9 of 11 votes to evict	Veronica; 9 of 10 votes to evict	Hamza; 8 of 9 votes to evict	Merron; 5 of 8 votes to evict	Erica; 5 of 7 votes to evict	Ryan; 6 of 6 votes to evict	Alejandra; 4 of 5 votes to evict	Johnny; 0 of 3 votes to save	Maddy; 2 of 2 votes to evict	Will; Kaela's choice to evict	Derek; Paras' choice to evict	Paras; 6 votes to win
Evicted	Rozina; 11 of 11 votes to evict	Andrew; 10 of 10 votes to evict	Jesse; 9 of 11 votes to evict	Veronica; 9 of 10 votes to evict	Hamza; 8 of 9 votes to evict	Merron; 5 of 8 votes to evict	Erica; 5 of 7 votes to evict	Ryan; 6 of 6 votes to evict	Alejandra; 4 of 5 votes to evict	Olivia; 0 of 3 votes to save	Maddy; 2 of 2 votes to evict	Will; Kaela's choice to evict	Derek; Paras' choice to evict	Kaela; 1 vote to win

== Have-Nots ==
	Week 1 (Note: Alejandra, Johnny, Kaela, Maddy, Paras, Rozina, and Will were put in Hell by Andrew on night one, putting them on slop and without their personal belongings for the first week. After winning the first Head of Household, Johnny was immune from this punishment.)	Week 2	Week 3	Week 4 (Note: Originally, Olivia successfully completed a task so there would be no Have-Nots for the week. After the Veto ceremony, Big Brother punished the houseguests and put all of them on slop for the remainder of the week.)	Week 5	Week 6 (Note: There were no official Have-Nots for this week, however HouseGuests were put on slop for one hour for every five minutes that elapsed from the beginning to the end of the endurance Head of Household competition.)	Week 7	Week 8	Week 9	Week 10
Have-Nots	none	Derek, Erica, Hamza, Jesse	Derek, Erica, Kaela, Merron	none	Alejandra, Johnny, Kaela, Merron	none	Alejandra, Kaela, Olivia, Paras	Derek, Kaela	none	

== Nomination shortlist ==
	Week 1 (Note: The shortlist was not revealed to the viewers.)	Week 2	Week 3	Week 4 (Note: Due to a double eviction, the second round of week 4 had no shortlist.)		Week 5	Week 6	Week 7	Week 8 (Note: Due to a triple eviction, the second round of week 8 had no shortlist.)		Week 9	Week 10 (Note: No nomination ceremony was held for the final eviction, as the nominees were the losers of the Final HoH competition.)	
HOH	Johnny	Ryan	Hamza	Erica	Olivia	Erica	Kaela	Derek	Johnny	Derek	Kaela	Paras	Paras
Shortlist	none	Andrew, Erica, Hamza, Olivia	Alejandra, Jesse, Olivia, Ryan	Hamza, Maddy, Merron, Veronica	none	Alejandra, Merron, Ryan, Will	Johnny, Maddy, Ryan, Will	none	Alejandra, Derek, Kaela, Paras	none	Maddy, Paras, Will	Derek, Kaela, Will	none

== Production ==
=== Development ===
It was originally announced in June 2017 that Big Brother Canada had been put on indefinite hiatus. In response, the show's fan base started a campaign to save the program. After several weeks, it was announced that due to the overwhelming response from viewers, the show had been green lit for a sixth season in 2018.

=== Teasers ===
A 15-second teaser was released following the conclusion of the first season of the American celebrity version.

=== Prize ===
The winner of the series, determined by the previously evicted HouseGuests, wins CA$100,000, while the runner-up receives CA$20,000. The HouseGuest selected as Canada's Favourite HouseGuest receives $50,000. The winner also received sponsored prizes such as a European dream vacation for two, courtesy of Air Transat, as well as a $30,000 home makeover from The Brick.

== Ratings ==
#	Air Date	Canada		Source
#	Air Date	Viewers (millions)	Rank (week)	Source
1	Wednesday, March 7, 2018	1.291	15	
2	Thursday, March 8, 2018	1.210	21	
3	Monday, March 12, 2018	1.158	18	
4	Wednesday, March 14, 2018	1.045	24	
5	Thursday, March 15, 2018	1.038	25	
6	Monday, March 19, 2018	1.092	24	
7	Wednesday, March 21, 2018	1.211	14	
8	Thursday, March 22, 2018	1.168	18	
9	Monday, March 26, 2018	1.201	18	
10	Wednesday, March 28, 2018	1.091	25	
11	Thursday, March 29, 2018	1.057	27	
12	Monday, April 2, 2018	1.172	24	
13	Wednesday, April 4, 2018	1.227	20	
14	Thursday, April 5, 2018	1.154	25	
15	Monday, April 9, 2018	1.182	21	
16	Wednesday, April 11, 2018	1.097	25	
17	Thursday, April 12, 2018	1.139	23	
18	Monday, April 16, 2018	1.100	23	
19	Wednesday, April 18, 2018	1.131	21	
20	Thursday, April 19, 2018	1.029	28	
21	Monday, April 23, 2018	0.984	26	
22	Wednesday, April 25, 2018	0.953	29	
23	Thursday, April 26, 2018	0.991	25	
24	Monday, April 30, 2018	1.144	21	
25	Wednesday, May 2, 2018	1.136	22	
26	Thursday, May 3, 2018	1.094	24	
27	Monday, May 7, 2018	<0.917	>30	
28	Wednesday, May 9, 2018	1.163	21	
29	Thursday, May 10, 2018	1.248	15	
