= Big Brother Canada season 12 =

Season of television series

Big Brother Canada
- Season 12
- Presented by: Arisa Cox
- No. of days: 69
- No. of houseguests: 14
- Winner: Bayleigh Pelham
- Runner-up: Anthony Douglas
- Canada's Favourite HouseGuest: Todd Clements
- No. of episodes: 29

Release
- Original network: Global
- Original release: March 5 – May 8, 2024

Additional information
- Filming dates: March 1 – May 8, 2024

Season chronology
- ← Previous; Season 11

Big Brother Canada 12 is the twelfth season of the Canadian reality television series Big Brother Canada. The series premiered on March 5, 2024, on Global and was the final season of the Global/Slice iteration of the show. Hosted by Arisa Cox, the show revolves around fourteen contestants (known as HouseGuests), who volunteered to reside in a house under constant surveillance and without any communication with the outside world as they compete to win a grand prize of C$200,000 in cash and prizes. This season features 12 new HouseGuests compete against two returning All-Star HouseGuests.

After 69 days in the competition, Bayleigh Pelham, a bartender and new houseguest from Halifax, Nova Scotia, was crowned the winner over returning houseguest Anthony Douglas in a 6–1 vote during the season finale on May 8, 2024. Todd Clements was named Canada's Favourite Houseguest by popular vote.

== Format ==
Big Brother Canada follows a group of contestants, known as House Guests who move into a custom-built house outfitted with cameras and microphones, recording their every move 24 hours a day. The House Guests are sequestered in the Big Brother Canada House with no contact with the outside world. During their stay, the House Guests share their thoughts on events and other HouseGuests inside a private room referred to as the Diary Room. At the start of each week in the house, the House Guests compete for the title of Head of Household, often shortened to simply HoH. The winner of the HoH competition is immune from eviction and will name two House Guests to be nominated for eviction. After the nominees are determined, the Power of Veto competition is played. Five players will compete in the competition: the two nominees and three random players, with the winner receiving the Power of Veto. If a House Guest chooses to exercise the Power of Veto, the Head of Household is obligated to name a replacement nominee. The holder of the Power of Veto is safe from being nominated as the replacement nominee. On eviction night, all House Guests must vote to evict one of the nominees, with the exception of the nominees and the Head of Household. The eviction vote is by secret ballot, with House Guests casting their votes orally in the Diary Room. In the event of a tied vote, the Head of Household will cast a tie-breaking vote publicly. The nominee with the majority of the votes is evicted from the house. Midway through the season, the evicted House Guests go on to become members of the "jury"; the jury is responsible for choosing who wins the series. The final Head of Household competition is split into three parts; the winners of the first two rounds compete in the third and final round. Once only two House Guests remain, the members of the jury cast their votes for who should win the series.

== HouseGuests ==
The cast of the twelfth season of Big Brother Canada. Top: Avery, Vivek, Kayla, Matthew, Dinis, Janine, Donna and Elijah Bottom: Todd, Victoria, Tola, Bayleigh, Lexus and Anthony

The images and profiles of the new HouseGuests for the twelfth season were released on February 28, 2024. It was also announced that two "Mystery All-Stars" were going to be on the cast, with their identities being revealed during the premiere. The two "Mystery All-Stars" were revealed to be Anthony Douglas, the runner up of Big Brother Canada 7, and Victoria Woghiren, the first juror from Big Brother Canada 9.

Ibrahim Appiah, a 34-year-old sales engineer from Vancouver, British Columbia, was originally announced as a member of the cast, but was later removed for unknown reasons. Tola Eam joined the cast in Appiah's place.

Name	Age	Occupation	Residence	Result
Bayleigh Pelham	34	Bartender	Halifax, Nova Scotia	Winner; Day 69
Anthony Douglas Big Brother Canada 7	36	Energy Compliance Supervisor (Note: Douglas' bio credits him as an "Energy Compliance Supervisor"; however, on the show, he confirmed that he lost this job to participate in the show.)	Richmond Hill, Ontario	Runner-up; Day 69
Lexus Jackson	24	Dental hygienist	Toronto, Ontario	Evicted; Day 69
Todd Clements	31	General contractor	Happy Valley-Goose Bay, Newfoundland and Labrador	Evicted; Day 63
Victoria Woghiren Big Brother Canada 9	30	Social worker	Hamilton, Ontario	Evicted; Day 60
Tola Eam	40	Fiber optic technician	Ottawa, Ontario	Evicted; Day 55
Avery Martin	26	Videographer	Selkirk, Manitoba	Evicted; Day 55
Kayla Clennon	26	Volleyball coach	Stouffville, Ontario	Evicted; Day 48
Elijah Kazlauskas	31	ESL teacher	North Bay, Ontario	Evicted; Day 41
Matthew Wong	27	Kinesiologist	Surrey, British Columbia	Evicted; Day 40
Vivek Sabbarwal	25	Software developer	Saint John, New Brunswick	Evicted; Day 33
Dinis Freitas	48	Textile designer	Toronto, Ontario	Evicted; Day 27
Donna Marshall	26	Artist	Hubbards, Nova Scotia	Evicted; Day 20
Janine Holmes	44	Hair and make-up artist	Toronto, Ontario	Evicted; Day 13

== Summary ==
Twelve new House Guests entered the Big Brother Canada House, with two returning All-Star House Guests, Victoria from Season 9 and Anthony from Season 7, joining as mystery House Guests and granted immunity for the first week.

The initial competitions established alliances, including a gender-based alliance known as "Big Sister." Anthony and Victoria competed for the first Head of Household (HOH) and later led entourages that provided safety for the first week.

Anthony won the first HOH and nominated two House Guests for eviction. Subsequent competitions and nominations led to several evictions, with the game initially played in teams, later transitioning to individual play.

Throughout the season, House Guests competed in various competitions for power, safety, and rewards. Alliances such as "Hot Chocolate" and "The Directors" formed, and strategic nominations and evictions occurred. Notable twists included the introduction of the Executive Veto and a series of special competitions.

In the final weeks, the remaining House Guests competed in a series of head-to-head competitions to determine the final Head of Household and ultimately the winner. Anthony secured the final HOH and voted to evict Lexus, who became the season's final juror.

Bayleigh was crowned the winner of Big Brother Canada 12, with Anthony finishing as the runner-up. Todd was named Canada's Favourite House Guest, earning $10,000. The runner-up received $20,000, while the winner took home $100,000 along with various prizes from sponsors.

== Episodes ==
No. overall	No. in season	Title	Day(s)	Original release date
Week 1
305	1	Episode 1	Day 1	March 5, 2024
306	2	Episode 2	TBA	March 6, 2024
Week 2
307	3	Episode 3	TBA	March 10, 2024
308	4	Episode 4	TBA	March 12, 2024
309	5	Episode 5	TBA	March 13, 2024
Week 3
310	6	Episode 6	TBA	March 17, 2024
311	7	Episode 7	TBA	March 19, 2024
312	8	Episode 8	TBA	March 20, 2024
Week 4
313	9	Episode 9	TBA	March 24, 2024
314	10	Episode 10	TBA	March 26, 2024
315	11	Episode 11	TBA	March 27, 2024
Week 5
316	12	Episode 12	TBA	March 31, 2024
317	13	Episode 13	TBA	April 2, 2024
318	14	Episode 14	TBA	April 3, 2024
Week 6
319	15	Episode 15	TBA	April 7, 2024
320	16	Episode 16	TBA	April 9, 2024
321	17	Episode 17	TBA	April 10, 2024
Week 7
322	18	Episode 18	TBA	April 14, 2024
323	19	Episode 19	TBA	April 16, 2024
324	20	Episode 20	TBA	April 17, 2024
Week 8
325	21	Episode 21	TBA	April 21, 2024
326	22	Episode 22	TBA	April 23, 2024
327	23	Episode 23	TBA	April 24, 2024
Week 9
328	24	Episode 24	TBA	April 28, 2024
329	25	Episode 25	TBA	April 30, 2024
330	26	Episode 26	TBA	May 1, 2024
Week 10
331	27	Episode 27	TBA	May 5, 2024
332	28	Episode 28	TBA	May 7, 2024
333	29	Episode 29	TBA	May 8, 2024

== Voting history ==
Summary of the HouseGuests' votes and nominations
	Weeks 1-2	Week 3	Week 4	Week 5	Week 6	Week 7		Week 8		Week 9	Week 10		
	Weeks 1-2	Week 3	Week 4	Week 5	Week 6	Day 41	Day 42	Day 48	Day 55	Week 9	Day 61	Day 69	Finale
Head of Household	Anthony	Victoria	Vivek	Elijah	Avery	Victoria	Avery	Tola	Victoria	Anthony	Bayleigh	Anthony	(none)
Nominations (pre-veto)	Avery; Janine	Elijah; Vivek	Bayleigh; Elijah	Todd; Tola	Elijah; Tola	Avery; Kayla	Todd; Tola	Avery; Bayleigh	Lexus; Tola	Lexus; Todd	Lexus; Todd	Bayleigh; Lexus	(none)
Veto Winner(s)	Dinis	Dinis	Kayla	Lexus	Tola	Kayla	Bayleigh	Todd	Todd	Todd	Lexus	(none)	(none)
Veto Winner(s)	Dinis	Dinis	Kayla	Victoria	Tola	Kayla	Bayleigh	Todd	Todd	Todd	Lexus	(none)	(none)
Nominations (post-veto)	Avery; Janine	Donna; Elijah	Dinis; Elijah	Tola; Vivek	Elijah; Matthew	Avery; Elijah	Kayla; Tola	Avery; Bayleigh	Lexus; Tola	Lexus; Victoria	Anthony; Todd	(none)	(none)
Bayleigh	Janine	Elijah	Dinis	Vivek	Matthew	Elijah	Kayla	Nominated	Tola	Victoria	Head of Household	Nominated	Winner (Day 69)
Anthony	Head of Household	Donna	Dinis	Vivek	Elijah	Elijah	Kayla	Avery	Tola	Head of Household	Nominated	Lexus	Runner-up (Day 69)
Lexus	Janine	Donna	Dinis	Vivek	Elijah	Elijah	Kayla	Avery	Nominated	Nominated	Todd	Evicted (Day 69)	Bayleigh
Todd	Janine	Elijah	Dinis	Vivek	Matthew	Elijah	Kayla	Avery	Tola	Victoria	Nominated	Evicted (Day 63)	Bayleigh
Victoria	Janine	Head of Household	Dinis	Vivek	Matthew	Head of Household	Kayla	Bayleigh	Head of Household	Nominated	Evicted (Day 60)		Bayleigh
Tola	Janine	Donna	Dinis	Nominated	Elijah	Elijah	Nominated	Head of Household	Nominated	Evicted (Day 55)			Bayleigh
Avery	Nominated	Donna	Dinis	Vivek	Head of Household	Nominated	Head of Household	Nominated	Evicted (Day 55)				Bayleigh
Kayla	Janine	Donna	Dinis	Vivek	Matthew	Elijah	Nominated	Evicted (Day 48)					Bayleigh
Elijah	Janine	Nominated	Nominated	Head of Household	Nominated	Nominated	Evicted (Day 41)						Anthony
Matthew	Janine	Donna	Dinis	Vivek	Nominated	Evicted (Day 40)							
Vivek	Janine	Donna	Head of Household	Nominated	Evicted (Day 33)								
Dinis	Janine	Elijah	Nominated	Evicted (Day 27)									
Donna	Janine	Nominated	Evicted (Day 20)										
Janine	Nominated	Evicted (Day 13)											
Notes	1, 2	none	3	4, 5	none	6	none		7	none			8
Evicted	Janine; 11 of 11 votes to evict	Donna; 7 of 10 votes to evict	Dinis; 9 of 9 votes to evict	Vivek; 8 of 8 votes to evict	Matthew; 4 of 7 votes to evict	Elijah; 6 of 6 votes to evict	Kayla; 5 of 5 votes to evict	Avery; 3 of 4 votes to evict	Tola; 3 of 3 votes to evict	Victoria; 2 of 2 votes to evict	Todd; Lexus’ choice to evict	Lexus; Anthony’s choice to evict	Anthony; 1 vote to win
Evicted	Janine; 11 of 11 votes to evict	Donna; 7 of 10 votes to evict	Dinis; 9 of 9 votes to evict	Vivek; 8 of 8 votes to evict	Matthew; 4 of 7 votes to evict	Elijah; 6 of 6 votes to evict	Kayla; 5 of 5 votes to evict	Avery; 3 of 4 votes to evict	Tola; 3 of 3 votes to evict	Victoria; 2 of 2 votes to evict	Todd; Lexus’ choice to evict	Lexus; Anthony’s choice to evict	Bayleigh; 6 votes to win

Notes

- ^Note 1: On Day 1, the 12 new HouseGuests competed in an endurance challenge. The winner (Lexus) earned Immunity. Additionally, the order they placed determined the order they would select an "Entourage" headed by either All-Star Anthony or Victoria.
- ^Note 2: In Week 1, only the All Stars, Anthony and Victoria could compete for the Head of Household. While both were granted immunity for the week (noted by ) the winner of the HoH competition would also grant immunity to their team (noted by )
- ^Note 3: During Week 3's HoH Competition, Avery won a Game Advantage, which was revealed to be Immunity for the week.
- ^Note 4: On Day 33, the Executive Veto was introduced to the game during the Executive Meeting and awarded by a Chain of Rejection selection. Unlike the regular Power of Veto, the saved nominee would name the replacement nominee. Lexus as the regular Veto holder, and Elijah as the HoH were immune to this nomination. Victoria won the Executive Veto and used it on Todd. Todd named Vivek as the replacement nominee.
- ^Note 5: For Week 5's eviction, as part of the Executive Meeting, the HouseGuests wrote their vote on a card before revealing their votes in a face-to-face round of voting.
- ^Note 6: On Day 41, the Movie Night Massacre occurred, in which an instant eviction took place. As part of this twist, an immunity competition took place, which also determined the order in which the HouseGuest would select a role for another HouseGuest in the Movie Night Casting selection - which would determine the roles for the night. Bayleigh won immunity and was the first to participate in the role selection. Notable role selections included:
  - Bayleigh choosing Victoria as Head of Household (who was immune, but did not nominate except to name a replacement nominee).
  - Todd nominating Avery.
  - Tola nominating Kayla.
  - Elijah was ineligible to vote by Anthony (though this penalty was irrelevant as Elijah became the replacement nominee).
- ^Note 7: This week was a double eviction week. Following the first eviction, the remaining HouseGuests played a week's worth of games, including HoH and Veto competitions and Nomination, Veto and Eviction ceremonies, during the remainder of the live show, culminating in a second eviction for the night.
- ^Note 8: The Jury voted for the winner of Big Brother Canada 12 and grand prize of $200,000 in cash and prizes.

== Have-Nots ==
At the start of each week, a group of HouseGuests are selected to become the Have-Nots for the week. Those selected to be the Have-Nots are restricted to a slop diet and cold showers. There was no official Have-Not room for this season.

Summary of HouseGuests who became Have-Nots each week.
	Week 1	Week 2	Week 3	Week 4	Week 5	Week 6	Week 7	Week 8	Week 9	Week 10
Have-Nots	none	Avery, Donna, Lexus, Vivek	Dinis, Elijah, Todd, Vivek	Anthony, Bayleigh, Matthew, Tola	~~Anthony~~, Kayla, Tola, Victoria, Vivek	none		~~Anthony~~, Bayleigh, Victoria	none	

== Production ==
=== Development ===
The show's renewal was released via a press release on June 7, 2023.

=== Twists ===
==== Executive Veto ====
In the Pool Room, an Executive Veto was displayed. On Day 33, an "Executive Meeting" was held, with the Lounge Room transformed into a Boardroom. The HouseGuests were told that the Executive Veto would be awarded by a Chain of Rejection. Beginning with Elijah, as reigning Head of Household, each HouseGuest would select another HouseGuest to reject, denying them the opportunity to gain the power. The remaining unselected HouseGuest would be awarded the Executive Veto. It was then revealed that the power of the Executive Veto would allow the holder to veto one of that week's nominations, with the saved nominee naming the replacement nomination. Elijah as Head of Household and Lexus as the week's regular Veto Holder were immune to this nomination .

Below is the full selection order for the rejection chain selection.

	Rejection Chain
Head of Household	Elijah
1	Tola
2	Bayleigh
3	Vivek
4	Todd
5	Lexus
6	Matthew
7	Kayla
8	Anthony
9	Avery
Executive Veto	Victoria

Additionally, as part of the Executive Meeting, the HouseGuests would vote in that week's eviction in an face-to-face vote, with HouseGuests writing their vote on a card, before revealing their vote to the group. This voting process had previously occurred in Big Brother Canada 3 as part of an Instant Eviction twist.

==== The Movie Night Massacre ====
On Day 41, a special Instant Eviction took place. The houseguests competed in a special competition for immunity and to determine the order in which they cast the "roles" of that round. The first place would receive immunity and could cast any other HouseGuest to any other role; the second place would be next to make a casting selection, and so on. Whoever finished in second last would cast the final role by default and the last place finsiher would not get to cast any role. No one can cast themselves in a role. The roles are:

- Safe: The competition winner is automatically cast in this role and awarded immunity for the night. Additionally, they will make the first casting decision.
- Head of Household: They were also awarded immunity for the night. While they will name a replacement nominee should one be required, they will not make the original nominations (as they are roles to be cast) and will not vote unless a tie-break vote is required. Like normal gameplay, this HoH was subject to the outgoing HoH rule, notably rendering the holder of the role unable to compete for in the next HoH competition.
- Nominee: Two HouseGuests will be cast as the Original Nominees for the night’s eviction.
- Slop Pass: The HouseGuest cast in this role will be given a Slop Pass, preventing them from being a Have-Not for the rest of the season.
- Veto Players: The three HouseGuest Veto Players will play in the PoV in addition to the nominees. There was no random draw for Veto Players.
- No Eviction Vote: The HouseGuest cast in this role will not vote in the eviction.

The game would then proceed normally, with a Power of Veto competition, Veto Ceremony and an Eviction vote. Below is the order in which each HouseGuest participated in the casting selection process and which HouseGuest they cast to a chosen role. In addition to the gameplay twist, the Immunity/Casting Order and PoV competitions are horror movie-themed.

	HouseGuest	Casting Choice	Role
1	Competition Winner	Bayleigh	Safe
2	Bayleigh	Victoria	Head of Household
3	Tola	Kayla	Nominee 1
4	Todd	Avery	Nominee 2
5	Lexus	Tola	PoV Player 1
6	Anthony	Elijah	No Eviction; Vote
7	Victoria	Anthony	Slop Pass
8	Avery	Todd	PoV Player 2
9	Elijah	Lexus	PoV Player 3
10	Kayla	No Casting Choice	

=== Production design ===
On February 26, 2024, Global released four images of the new Big Brother Canada house.

=== Digital Dailies ===
On February 27, 2024, it was announced that Live Feeds would not be reinstated and the "Digital Dailies" introduced during season 11 would return for a second year, featuring uncut footage from the house that will be published weekly on the show's website. It was also promised that the Digital Dailies would be more expansive this year.

=== Prizes ===
The HouseGuests are competing for the largest prize in Big Brother Canada history, valued at over $200,000 - the grand prize includes $130,000 in cash (consisting of the base prize of $100,000 with an additional $10,000 each provided by three sponsors: (Philips Sonicare Oral Care, TonyBet and Endy), a two-year lease of a 2024 Infiniti QX60 SU, a Cuban beach vacation provided by Sunwing Vacations, a $10,000 Samsung Galaxy prize pack, $10,000 of clothing courtesy of Winners and a year’s worth of food from Skip the Dishes valued at $10,000. The runner-up wins $20,000. Canada's Favourite Houseguest will also return with the Canadian public voting for the recipient of a $10,000 prize courtesy of Winners.

Additional prizes will also be awarded over the course of the game.
