= Big Brother Canada season 9 =

Season of television series

Big Brother Canada
- Season 9
- Big Brother Canada 9 title card
- Presented by: Arisa Cox
- No. of days: 69
- No. of houseguests: 14
- Winner: Tychon Carter-Newman
- Runner-up: Breydon White
- Canada's Favourite HouseGuest: Kiefer Collison
- No. of episodes: 29

Release
- Original network: Global
- Original release: March 3 – May 6, 2021

Additional information
- Filming dates: February 27 – May 6, 2021

Season chronology
- ← Previous; Season 8 Next → Season 10

Big Brother Canada 9 is the ninth season of the Canadian reality television series Big Brother Canada. The series began filming on February 27, 2021, and premiered on March 3, 2021, on Global. Hosted by Arisa Cox, the show revolved around fourteen contestants (known as HouseGuests), who volunteered to reside in a house while being constantly filmed without any communication with the outside world as they compete to win a grand prize of CA$100,000.

The season concluded on May 6, 2021, after 69 days of competition. It was won by urban planner Tychon Carter-Newman, who defeated anthropology student Breydon White in a 6-1 jury vote. Carter-Newman is the first Black Canadian to win a season of Big Brother Canada, and the second to win a season among North American Big Brother adaptations, after Tamar Braxton of the second season of the American celebrity spin-off. Kiefer Collison won an online vote to become this season's Canada's Favourite HouseGuest, being the first to receive such distinction.

== Format ==
Big Brother Canada follows a group of contestants, known as HouseGuests who move into a custom-built house outfitted with cameras and microphones, recording their every move 24 hours a day. The HouseGuests are sequestered in the Big Brother Canada House with no contact with the outside world. During their stay, the HouseGuests share their thoughts on events and other HouseGuests inside a private room referred to as the Diary Room. At the start of each week in the house, the HouseGuests compete for the title of Head of Household, often shortened to simply HoH. The winner of the HoH competition is immune from eviction and will name two HouseGuests to be nominated for eviction. After the nominees are determined, the Power of Veto competition is played. Five players will compete in the competition: the two nominees and three random players, with the winner receiving the Power of Veto. If a HouseGuest chooses to exercise the Power of Veto, the Head of Household is obligated to name a replacement nominee. The holder of the Power of Veto is safe from being nominated as the replacement nominee. On eviction night, all HouseGuests must vote to evict one of the nominees, with the exception of the nominees and the Head of Household. The eviction vote is by secret ballot, with HouseGuests casting their votes orally in the Diary Room. In the event of a tied vote, the Head of Household will cast a tie-breaking vote publicly. The nominee with the majority of the votes is evicted from the house. Midway through the season, the evicted HouseGuests go on to become members of the "jury"; the jury is responsible for choosing who wins the series. The final Head of Household competition is split into three parts; the winners of the first two rounds compete in the third and final round. Once only two HouseGuests remain, the members of the jury cast their votes for who should win the series.

== HouseGuests ==
The cast of the ninth season of Big Brother Canada. From left to right: Austin, Jedson, Tera, Rohan, Kiefer, Beth, Latoya, Josh, Victoria, Kyle, Breydon, Tychon, Julie and Tina

The HouseGuests' images and profiles were released on Wednesday, February 24, 2021. Initially announced HouseGuest Ethan Quance was later removed when significant concerns were brought to the attention of production. He was replaced by Kyle Moore.

Name	Age	Occupation	Residence	Entry	Result
Tychon Carter-Newman	29	Urban planner	Montreal, Quebec	1	Winner; Day 69
Breydon White	23	Anthropology student	Calgary, Alberta	1	Runner-up; Day 69
Tera Gillen-Petrozzi	37	Full-time mom & spin instructor	LaSalle, Ontario	55	Evicted; Day 69
Tera Gillen-Petrozzi	37	Full-time mom & spin instructor	LaSalle, Ontario	1	Fake Evicted; Day 55
Kiefer Collison	32	Radio host	Old Massett, British Columbia	1	Evicted; Day 64
Beth Bieda	27	Homeless support worker	Tomahawk, Alberta	1	Evicted; Day 62
Jedson Tavernier	25	Personal trainer	Aurora, Ontario	55	Evicted; Day 55
Jedson Tavernier	25	Personal trainer	Aurora, Ontario	1	Fake Evicted; Day 55
Tina Thistle	42	Graphic designer	Paradise, Newfoundland and Labrador	1	Evicted; Day 48
Rohan Kapoor	26	Strategic partnerships manager	Toronto, Ontario	1	Evicted; Day 41
Victoria Woghiren	27	Youth advocate	Hamilton, Ontario	1	Evicted; Day 41
Austin Dookwah	23	Realtor & model	Newmarket, Ontario	1	Evicted; Day 34
Kyle Moore	26	Unemployed ice hockey coach	Red Deer, Alberta	1	Evicted; Day 27
Latoya Anderson	34	Police officer & designer	Pickering, Ontario	1	Evicted; Day 20
Josh Farnworth	30	Film production co-ordinator	New Westminster, British Columbia	1	Evicted; Day 13
Julie Vu	28	Social media influencer	Vancouver, British Columbia	1	Evicted; Day 6

=== Future appearances ===
In 2022, Tychon Carter-Newman, with his father Cedric competed on The Amazing Race Canada 8.

In 2024, Victoria Woghiren returned to compete as a HouseGuest on Big Brother Canada 12.

== Summary ==
Week 1
On Day 1, fourteen new HouseGuests moved into the Big Brother Canada house for up to three months and a chance to win the grand prize of $100,000 in addition to prizes from sponsors valued at $20,000. The public voted for the two HouseGuests they wanted to become team captains before the start of the season. Kiefer and Tina were revealed to be the winners and the captains for Team Defender and Team Destiny respectively. After entering the house, the pair entered the OLG Lounge to observe the remaining twelve HouseGuests in secret monitor with no sound. After all the HouseGuests entered Kiefer and Tina were tasked to pick their teams based on first impressions. Arisa revealed to the group that there would be no Head of Household or Power of Veto competitions for the week instead the teams would compete for safety.
- Safety Competition ("Drop in the Bucket"): This competition was played in teams. As Team Captains, Kiefer and Tina did not participate since they were already safe from eviction. HouseGuests must hold a bucket of toxic sludge. If their bucket drops, they will be eliminated. The starting weight of each bucket was filled based on the physical proportions of the HouseGuests to make the competition as fair as possible. In addition, the Captains may add sludge to the opposing team's buckets at selected times. The last team standing will be safe, and the members of the other team will be nominated for eviction. Victoria won for Team Destiny.

As a result of Victoria winning the safety competition for Team Destiny, her team received a feast for the night. Meanwhile, Team Defenders, as the losing team, received slop. Breydon, Jedson, Josh, Julie, Latoya and Rohan from Team Defenders all faced eviction. Latoya campaigned to evict Julie under the assumption of Julie being a loud-mouth, while Josh wanted to evict Rohan for being a potential threat. On Day 6, all HouseGuests, except for Tina, voted to evict one of the two nominees on eviction night. Tina, as the Captain of the winning team, would only vote in the event of a tie. Prior to the eviction vote, the members of Team Destiny anonymously submitted questions for the nominees of Team Defender. Julie was evicted after receiving eleven eviction votes. Josh received two eviction votes, while the other four nominees received zero eviction votes.

Week 2
Following Julie's eviction, the HouseGuests competed in the Head of Household competition.
- HoH Competition ("Arch Rivals"): HouseGuests must balance a ball in their bow and arrow, periodically adding an additional ball from time to time. If they drop any of their balls, they will be eliminated. Austin of Team Destiny was the last HouseGuest standing, making her the HoH and earning her team immunity for the week.

Big Brother presented the teams with a food dilemma. They had the opportunity to earn a feast of peanut butter and jelly, cookies, and milk for their team for the week. Each team would vote to either share the feast with the other team or steal it for themselves. If both teams share, they will share the feast. If one team steals, they will earn a luxury dinner, a week of groceries, and an advantage in the Power of Veto competition, while the team that shared will be on slop for the week. If both teams steal, the entire House will be on slop for the week. Both teams decided to share. On Day 7, Austin nominated Josh and Kiefer for eviction, with Josh as the target. Victoria, Tera and Tina were drawn to compete for the Power of Veto.

- PoV Competition ("Don't Upset the Apple Cart"): HouseGuests must steer their wheelbarrow down the winding track, placing five apples on their wheelbarrow every time they reach the end. If an apple hits the ground, it is out of play. They have 30 minutes to stack apples, but may lock in their score early if they feel they have enough to win. Kiefer placed the most apples, earning him the Power of Veto.

On Day 10, Kiefer elected to use the Power of Veto on himself, with Austin nominating Rohan in his place. On Day 13, Josh was evicted by a unanimous vote. Arisa then announced to the HouseGuests that the teams were officially disbanded, and everyone would play as individuals.

Week 3
Following Josh's eviction, the HouseGuests competed in the Head of Household competition.
- HoH Competition ("Dream to the Max"): The HouseGuests competed in a series of head-to-head matches. In each round, competitors will be shown a photo of a dream scenario. Arisa will then read them a statement about the scenario, the HouseGuest must determine whether that statement is true or false. The first person to answer correctly will advance and eliminate their opponent. However, if they answer incorrectly, they will be eliminated and their opponent will advance. Victoria was the last HouseGuest standing, making her the HoH as well as winning a lottery gift card from OLG and Lotto Max.

As Head of Household, Victoria had to name four HouseGuests to be Have-Nots for the week. Austin, Breydon, Kyle, and Rohan became Have-Nots for the week. Latoya became a target for trying to stage a last-minute flip against Rohan last week. Victoria also felt threatened by Kiefer after he tried to blame the flip on her. Austin, Breydon, and Victoria formed the "Bossy Glossies" alliance. On Day 14, Victoria nominated Kiefer and Latoya for eviction, with Latoya as the target. In order to counteract the other side of the House, Austin, Breydon, Kyle, Rohan, and Victoria formed the "Oddballs" alliance. Tychon, Jedson and Austin were drawn to compete for the Power of Veto.

- PoV Competition ("Instant Crossword"): HouseGuests must scratch off their board to reveal clues to solve their crossword. dropping letter tiles and blank tiles in the appropriate slot. If they drop a tile in the wrong spot, they must restart their crossword in order to fix it. Jedson was the first to correctly complete the puzzle, earning him the Power of Veto.

The HouseGuests learned that Breydon won the "Skip the Slop" vote, earning him a meal from Skip the Dishes and nullifying his Have-Not status for the remainder of the week. While Jedson wanted to save an ally, Victoria alluded that Beth or Tychon would be the replacement nominee to dissuade him from using it. On Day 17, Jedson decided not to use the Power of Veto. On Day 18, the HouseGuests played a game of "Big Brother Instant Bingo". Divided into two teams, HouseGuests in turn would scratch a space off their bingo card, revealing a dare. If they complete their dare, they earn a ball to complete their card. The first team to complete their card will earn a pizza party and will select a member of the losing team to become a bingo ball for the rest of the week. The team of Austin, Beth, Kiefer, Rohan, Tera, and Tychon won the pizza party, and Breydon became a bingo ball for the rest of the week. On Day 20, Latoya was evicted by a 6–3 vote, with Beth, Jedson, and Tychon voting to evict Kiefer.

Week 4
Following Latoya's eviction, the HouseGuests competed in the Head of Household competition.
- HoH Competition ("Seniors Disc-count"): Each HouseGuest will take one shot on the shuffleboard table, aiming to achieve the highest score. If their disc falls off the table, they will receive a zero. Kiefer scored the highest, making him the new Head of Household.

As the new Head of Household, Kiefer was required to name four Have-Nots. Rohan, Tera, Tina, and Victoria became Have-Nots for the week. On Day 21, Kiefer nominated Kyle and Rohan for eviction, with Rohan as his target. Kiefer hoped to split up a duo in the house, specially that of Kyle and Rohan, who made him feel threatened following a confrontation. Beth, Jedson, and Tychon formed "The Sauce" alliance. On Day 22, Beth, Jedson, and Austin were drawn to compete for the Power of Veto.

- PoV Competition ("Mole in One"): Using only their breath, HouseGuests must transfer balls across their playing field onto their designated tube. They must maneuver the course by popping their head through the various holes to control the balls. Rohan was the first to get ten balls in their tube, earning him the Power of Veto.

Rohan won the "Skip the Slop" vote, canceling his Have-Not status and earning a meal from "Skip the Dishes". Despite promising her safety, Kiefer considered nominating Austin due to her partnership with Breydon. On Day 24, Rohan used the Power of Veto on himself, making Kiefer name Austin as his replacement nominee. On Day 27, Kyle was evicted by a 7–1 vote, with Rohan voting to evict Austin.

Week 5
Following Kyle's eviction, the HouseGuests competed in the Invisible Head of Household competition. In a twist, this week's HoH would be made "invisible". They will make their nominations in secret, are eligible to be a Have-Not, play in the week's Power of Veto competition if drawn, and play in next week's Head of Household competition.
- Invisible HoH Competition: HouseGuests were sequestered in booths with clicker counters, where they must click the counter every time a rock drops down the conveyor belt above the players. They will also be made offers to look away from the conveyor belt, such as a feast if three people look away, a Slop Pass for the person who looks away the longest, and gave the person with the worst count the ability to drop out of the competition to earn a letter from home. The HouseGuest closest to the correct count will be the new Head of Household. In addition, the winner will remain anonymous, with no obligation to reveal their status. Tina earned the letter from home, while Victoria earned the slop pass. Victoria also became the invisible Head of Household. As the invisible Head of Household, Victoria had to anonymously name four Have-Nots for the week: Austin, Breydon, Kiefer, and Victoria. Despite being anonymous, Victoria felt caught between the "Oddballs" alliance and her desire to work with Tychon and Jedson, as well as feeling abandoned by the "Bossy Glossies" alliance. On Day 28, Victoria anonymously nominated Austin and Breydon for eviction. On Day 29, Austin and Breydon, up against Victoria, Tychon, and Rohan, competed in the Power of Veto competition.
- PoV Competition ("BBCAN Condo"): HouseGuests must place their I-beams to create a path across the construction site. They must then transfer their condo pieces one at a time across the site. The first HouseGuest to complete their condo puzzle will win the Power of Veto. Rohan was the winner.

On Day 31, Rohan decided not to use the Power of Veto. On Day 33, the Haves were given the task to cook a spaghetti lunch, make a huge mess, and force the Have-Nots to clean it up. The Have-Nots completed their task, earned a meal, and their Have-Not status ended. On Day 34, Austin was evicted by a unanimous vote.

Week 6
Following Austin's eviction, the HouseGuests competed in the Head of Household competition.
- HoH Competition ("BB Calendar"): HouseGuests were asked a series of questions based on the new “Big Brother” calendar they were shown the night before. An incorrect answer resulted in elimination. Beth was the last HouseGuest standing, making her the new Head of Household.

As the new Head of Household, Beth was required to name four Have-Nots for the week. Breydon, Rohan, Tera, and Tina became Have-Nots for the week. On Day 35, Beth nominated Rohan and Tera for eviction, with the plan to backdoor Victoria. Meanwhile, it was announced that Rohan won the "Skip the Slop" online vote. Breydon, Tina, and Tychon were drawn to compete for the Power of Veto alongside the nominees.

- PoV Competition ("Backyard Barbecue"): HouseGuests must open their grill and memorize the layout of their food. They must then toss their corn into their cornhole, toss their pineapple onto the skewer, and flip their hot dogs into their bun. They can then use their spatula to launch their food onto their grate. They must then rearrange their food on the grill exactly how it was at the beginning of the competition. Rohan was the fastest to correctly arrange the most food in their grill, earning him the Power of Veto, as well as a barbecue grill from Weber.On Day 38, Rohan used the Power of Veto on himself, making Beth name Victoria as her replacement nominee. On Day 41, Victoria was evicted by a unanimous vote, becoming the first member of the jury.

Arisa then informed the HouseGuests of the Double Eviction.

- HoH Competition ("Before or After"): In this competition, HouseGuests had to determine if one event took place before or after another event in the House. Each correct answer gave them one point. Kiefer earned the most points, making him the Head of Household.

Kiefer nominated Breydon and Rohan for eviction. Beth, Tina, and Tychon were drawn to compete for the power of veto alongside the nominees.

- PoV Competition ("Stone Cold Veto"): HouseGuests must maneuver their sword through their table maze. Tychon was the first to complete the maze, earning him the Power of Veto.

At the Veto Meeting, Tychon decided not to use the Power of Veto. At the end of the night, Rohan was evicted by a unanimous vote. He became the second member of the jury.

Week 7
Following the events of the Double Eviction, the HouseGuests competed in the Head of Household competition.
- HoH Competition ("Ball Pit Blitz"): HouseGuests must race into the ball pit in the Have-Not room, in search of white balls amongst the pile. They must then take a maximum of five white balls to the backyard and place them in their arrow. Each white ball they place in their arrow will give them one point, while white balls marked with an "X" will deduct one point from the HouseGuest's score. The latter can be placed on an opponent's arrow. After twenty minutes of competition, Jedson had the most points, making him the new HoH.On Day 42, Jedson nominated Tera and Tina for eviction. On Day 43, Beth, Kiefer, and Tychon were drawn to compete for the Power of Veto alongside the nominees.
- PoV Competition ("TikTok Moments"): This competition was played in three parts:
  - Part 1: HouseGuests must stack a series of blocks with symbols on them in a given order while blindfolded. Tera, Tina, and Beth were the first to correctly stack the blocks, advancing them to the next part.
  - Part 2: HouseGuests must recreate a slop recipe by searching for number cards in a big slop bowl, as well as converting their measurements to metric when completing the recipe. Tera and Tina were the first to complete the recipe, advancing them to the final round.
  - Part 3: HouseGuests must tilt six discs down their staircase. They must then bounce their ping pong ball down the stairs from disc to disc, aiming to land their ball in their cup. Tera was the first to land their ball in their cup, earning her the Power of Veto.

Needing a replacement nominee, Jedson debated whether to nominate outsider Breydon or to betray the “Sunsetters” by backdooring Kiefer as a big competitor. On Day 44, the HouseGuests were given the task to play a game of hide-and-seek. As the competition winners, Jedson and Tera were the seekers. The HouseGuests were given 100 seconds to hide. The last HouseGuest found will earn the right to make one HouseGuest sleep in the ball pit for the rest of the week. Beth was the last one found, and she chose Tychon to sleep in the ball pit. On Day 45, Tera used the Power of Veto on herself, and Jedson named Kiefer as the replacement nominee. On Day 46, the HouseGuests were given the task to eat a series of seven peppers, increasing in intensity. Each HouseGuest must eat one pepper. If they eat all of the peppers, they will earn a reward. They completed their task and earned a party. Despite originally being the target, Kiefer began to make inroads with “The Sauce”, pledging loyalty to their alliance. In addition, “The Sauce” began to fear Tera and Tina as a duo. On Day 48, Tina was evicted by a 3–1 vote, with Tera voting to evict Kiefer. She became the third member of the jury.

Week 8
Following Tina's eviction, the HouseGuests were competed in the Head of Household competition.
- HoH Competition ("The Unauthorized History of BBCAN9"): In the night before the competition, the HouseGuests listened to excerpts from an audiobook read by the evicted HouseGuests. In the competition, they must determine which HouseGuest read each excerpt. Each correct answer gave them one point. Tera earned the most points, making her the new HoH.As the new Head of Household, Tera was required to name three Have-Nots for the week. Beth, Jedson, and Tychon became Have-Nots. Determined to split up “The Sauce”, Tera made a deal with Breydon and Kiefer to protect one another moving forward. On Day 49, Tera nominated Beth and Jedson for eviction, with Jedson as her target. On Day 50, everyone except Tera competed for the Power of Veto.
- PoV Competition ("Adventures with Expedia"): HouseGuests listened to a series of clues from their loved ones describing specific pieces of luggage. They had to find the correct bags, and place them in their car. They then had to slide the barriers surrounding their car so they can slide their car through the puzzle. Finally, HouseGuests must solve a puzzle based on the wall signs in the Expedia room. Jedson was the fastest to complete the tasks, winning the Power of Veto, as well as a "once-in-a-lifetime" trip for two from Expedia.

On Day 51, it was announced that Tychon won the "Skip the Slop" online vote. Kiefer formulated a plan to convince Jedson to keep himself on the block, veto Beth instead, nominate Breydon as a fake target, and blindside Jedson on eviction night. On Day 52, Jedson fell for the plot and used the Power of Veto on Beth, and Tera nominated Breydon as her replacement nominee. On Day 55, Jedson was fake evicted by unanimous vote.

As part of a twist, Jedson, along with a second fake evictee for the night would compete in a competition to determine the week's actual evictee. He was sent to the HoH Room as Arisa then informed the remaining HouseGuests of the Double Eviction.

- HoH Competition ("Say What Now?"): HouseGuests were shown a series of clips showing events of the season. The HouseGuests must identify which day each event took place. However, the clips were dubbed with an alternate audio. After six questions, Tychon earned the most points, making him the HoH.

Tychon nominated Beth and Tera for eviction. The HouseGuests then competed for the Power of Veto.

- PoV Competition ("Comb Free"): HouseGuests will be connected to a rope strung and tied through a hair curler. They must maneuver themselves through their curler, loosening and untangling their rope as they go. Breydon was the first to untangle themselves from the curler, earning him the Power of Veto.

At the Veto Meeting, Breydon decided not to use the Power of Veto. On Day 55, Tera was fake evicted by a unanimous vote. Arisa then revealed that the night's fake evictees, Jedson and Tera, would battle in a head-to-head buyback competition, with the loser officially joining the jury and the winner returning to the game.

- Buyback Competition ("Heads Will Roll"): HouseGuests must roll three balls up their ramp, aiming to land them on the top ledge. Tera was the first to land all three balls on the top ledge, returning to the game.

With his loss, Jedson was officially evicted, becoming the fourth member of the jury.

Week 9
Following the events of the Fake Double Eviction, the HouseGuests competed in the Head of Household competition.
- HoH Competition ("All In To Win"): In each round, Tychon will spin the wheel to land on a trivia category. Based on the category, HouseGuests can bet up to five chips. If they answer correctly, they double their bet. If they answer incorrectly, they lose their bet. On the final question, HouseGuests can bet any amount of chips they want. Each HouseGuests started with ten chips. After seven questions, Breydon had the most chips, making him the new HoHAs the new Head of Household, Breydon was required to name two Have-Nots for the week: Beth and Kiefer. On Day 56, Breydon nominated Beth and Tera for eviction, with Beth as his target. The following day, the HouseGuests competed for the Power of Veto.
- PoV Competition ("On Tilt"): HouseGuests must drop a ball into their pinball table, run down to the bottom as it bounces off the flippers, catch it, and place it back into the table at the top. When the lights on their pinball table flash, HouseGuests must add another ball. They may only have one ball in their hand at a time. If a ball hits the ground, they will be eliminated. Breydon was the last HouseGuest standing, earning him the Power of Veto. On Day 58, the HouseGuests received a pool party with food and drinks to celebrate making the final five. On Day 59, Breydon decided not to use the Power of Veto. Meanwhile, it was announced that Kiefer won the "Skip the Slop" vote. On Day 60, Beth and Kiefer were given a task. They must spend the night in the backyard, counting the number of raccoons that appear throughout the night. If their count is within five of the correct amount, they will earn a barbecue party courtesy of Weber. However, the other HouseGuests were also given the secret mission to distract Beth and Kiefer to mess up their count. If they can get Beth and Kiefer to guess incorrectly, they will earn the party instead. Beth and Kiefer counted correctly, and the entire House earned the party. On Day 62, Beth was evicted by a unanimous vote. She became the fifth member of the jury.
Week 10: Finale
Following Beth's eviction, the HouseGuests competed in the Head of Household competition.
- HoH Competition ("Buzzer Beater"): HouseGuests will watch the monitors as it slowly reveals a series of cards with the HouseGuests’ faces on them, all of whom played in a Power of Veto competition together. They must buzz in and answer which HouseGuest was evicted right after that Power of Veto competition was played. If they are correct, they will earn one point. If they are incorrect, the other players will have a chance to answer. Tychon earned the most votes, making him the new HoH.On Day 62, the HouseGuests attended the “BBCAN Awards”. The HouseGuests were given a gala makeover and watched memorable moments from the season in the ball pit. On Day 63, Tychon nominated Kiefer and Tera for eviction.
- PoV Competition ("Code Veto"): HouseGuests must search the office using keys, filing cabinets, and a black light to find a series of photos of the HouseGuests. They must then place the photos to correspond with a series of clues regarding season events. After completing the puzzle, they will change into their superhero outfits for the second part of the competition. HouseGuests must memorize the colored numbers on the brick wall and break through it. They must then input the numbers on the corresponding colored dials. Tera input the correct code in the fastest time, earning her the Power of Veto.

At the Veto Meeting, Tera used the Power of Veto on herself, with Breydon taking her spot by virtue of being the only other HouseGuest eligible for nomination. On Day 64, Tera cast the sole vote to evict Kiefer. He became the sixth member of the jury. The HouseGuests then started competing to be the final Head of Household of the season.

- HoH Competition, Part 1 ("Hoverboard Lane"): HouseGuests must push their hoverboard down their lane, duck under it, and stack five discs on top of the two pegs at either side of their board. They must then slide their hoverboard to the other side and do it again. If they drop any discs, they must collect them and restack. They have four hours to complete the task. The first HouseGuest to stack sixty discs on their hoverboard will be the winner. As the four hours expired with no winner, they participated in a sudden death round. The HouseGuests repeated the task, except they were allowed to grab ten discs at a time. Eventually, Breydon became the first HouseGuest to stack forty discs on their hoverboard, advancing him to part 3.
- HoH Competition, Part 2 ("Light 'Em Up"): HouseGuests are surrounded by boards with questions regarding season events with number answers. Atop each board is a series of answer blocks. HouseGuests must toss balls to knock off the incorrect blocks, leaving the correct answers standing. Tychon completed the task the fastest, advancing him to part 3.
- HoH Competition, Part 3 ("Jury Questions"): HouseGuests were asked a series of questions based on members of the jury. Each correct answer earned them one point. Tychon had the most points after seven questions, becoming the final Head of Household of the season.On Day 69, Tychon cast the sole vote to evict Tera. She became the seventh and final member of the jury.

At the end of the night, Tychon was named the winner of Big Brother Canada 9 after receiving Victoria, Rohan, Tina, Jedson, Beth, and Kiefer's votes. Breydon was named runner-up to Tychon, only receiving the vote of Tera. Kiefer the online public vote to become Canada's Favourite HouseGuest.

== Episodes ==
No. overall	No. in season	Title	Original release date
Week 1
218	1	Episode 1	March 3, 2021
219	2	Episode 2	March 4, 2021
Week 2
220	3	Episode 3	March 8, 2021
221	4	Episode 4	March 10, 2021
222	5	Episode 5	March 11, 2021
Week 3
223	6	Episode 6	March 15, 2021
224	7	Episode 7	March 17, 2021
225	8	Episode 8	March 18, 2021
Week 4
226	9	Episode 9	March 22, 2021
227	10	Episode 10	March 24, 2021
228	11	Episode 11	March 25, 2021
Week 5
229	12	Episode 12	March 29, 2021
230	13	Episode 13	March 31, 2021
231	14	Episode 14	April 1, 2021
Week 6
232	15	Episode 15	April 5, 2021
233	16	Episode 16	April 7, 2021
234	17	Episode 17	April 8, 2021
Week 7
235	18	Episode 18	April 12, 2021
236	19	Episode 19	April 14, 2021
237	20	Episode 20	April 15, 2021
Week 8
238	21	Episode 21	April 19, 2021
239	22	Episode 22	April 21, 2021
240	23	Episode 23	April 22, 2021
Week 9
241	24	Episode 24	April 26, 2021
242	25	Episode 25	April 28, 2021
243	26	Episode 26	April 29, 2021
Week 10
244	27	Episode 27	May 3, 2021
245	28	Episode 28	May 5, 2021
246	29	Episode 29	May 6, 2021

== Voting history ==
Team Phase

At the beginning of the game, the HouseGuests competed in two teams. These are noted by color ( Team Defender Team Destiny). As part of the team format, the Head of Household would also win immunity for their team (indicated by ). On Day 13, the game reverted to the regular format, with the HouseGuests playing as individuals.

Summary of the HouseGuests' votes and nominations
	Team Phase		Individual Phase											
	Week 1	Week 2	Week 3	Week 4	Week 5	Week 6		Week 7	Week 8		Week 9	Week 10		
	Week 1	Week 2	Week 3	Week 4	Week 5	Day 34	Day 41	Week 7	Day 48	Day 55	Week 9	Day 62	Day 69	Finale
Head of Household	(none)	Austin	Victoria	Kiefer	Victoria	Beth	Kiefer	Jedson	Tera	Tychon	Breydon	Tychon	Tychon	(none)
Nominations (pre-veto)	Team Defender	Josh; Kiefer	Kiefer; Latoya	Kyle; Rohan	Austin; Breydon	Rohan; Tera	Breydon; Rohan	Tera; Tina	Beth; Jedson	Beth; Tera	Beth; Tera	Kiefer; Tera	Breydon; Tera	(none)
Veto Winner	(none)	Kiefer	Jedson	Rohan	Rohan	Rohan	Tychon	Tera	Jedson	Breydon	Breydon	Tera	(none)	(none)
Nominations (post-veto)	(none)	Josh; Rohan	Kiefer; Latoya	Austin; Kyle	Austin; Breydon	Tera; Victoria	Breydon; Rohan	Kiefer; Tina	Breydon; Jedson	Beth; Tera	Beth; Tera	Breydon; Kiefer	(none)	(none)
Tychon	Julie	Josh	Kiefer	Kyle	Austin	Victoria	Rohan	Tina	Jedson	Head of Household	Beth	Head of Household	Tera	Winner (Day 69)
Breydon	Julie	Josh	Latoya	Kyle	Nominated	Victoria	Nominated	Tina	Nominated	Tera	Head of Household	Nominated	Nominated	Runner-up (Day 69)
Tera	Julie	Josh	Latoya	Kyle	Austin	Nominated	Rohan	Kiefer	Head of Household	Nominated	Nominated	Kiefer	Evicted (Day 69)	Breydon
Kiefer	Julie	Josh	Nominated	Head of Household	Austin	Victoria	Head of Household	Nominated	Jedson	Tera	Beth	Nominated	Evicted (Day 64)	Tychon
Beth	Julie	Josh	Kiefer	Kyle	Austin	Head of Household	Rohan	Tina	Jedson	Nominated	Nominated	Evicted (Day 62)		Tychon
Jedson	Julie	Josh	Kiefer	Kyle	Austin	Victoria	Rohan	Head of Household	Nominated	In HOH; Suite	Evicted (Day 55)			Tychon
Tina	Not eligible	Josh	Latoya	Kyle	Austin	Victoria	Rohan	Nominated	Evicted (Day 48)					Tychon
Rohan	Julie	Nominated	Latoya	Austin	Austin	Victoria	Nominated	Evicted (Day 41)						Tychon
Victoria	Josh	Josh	Head of Household	Kyle	Head of Household	Nominated	Evicted (Day 41)							Tychon
Austin	Julie	Head of Household	Latoya	Nominated	Nominated	Evicted (Day 34)								
Kyle	Julie	Josh	Latoya	Nominated	Evicted (Day 27)									
Latoya	Julie	Josh	Nominated	Evicted (Day 20)										
Josh	Julie	Nominated	Evicted (Day 13)											
Julie	Josh	Evicted (Day 6)												
Notes	1, 2	none			3	none	4	none	5		none			6
Evicted	Julie; 11 of 13 votes to evict	Josh; 10 of 10 votes to evict	Latoya; 6 of 9 votes to evict	Kyle; 7 of 8 votes to evict	Austin; 7 of 7 votes to evict	Victoria; 6 of 6 votes to evict	Rohan; 5 of 5 votes to evict	Tina; 3 of 4 votes to evict	Jedson; 3 of 3 votes to fake evict	Tera; 2 of 2 votes to fake evict	Beth; 2 of 2 votes to evict	Kiefer; Tera's choice to evict	Tera; Tychon's choice to evict	Breydon; 1 vote to win
Evicted	Julie; 11 of 13 votes to evict	Josh; 10 of 10 votes to evict	Latoya; 6 of 9 votes to evict	Kyle; 7 of 8 votes to evict	Austin; 7 of 7 votes to evict	Victoria; 6 of 6 votes to evict	Rohan; 5 of 5 votes to evict	Tina; 3 of 4 votes to evict	Jedson; 3 of 3 votes to fake evict	Jedson; Evicted by competition	Beth; 2 of 2 votes to evict	Kiefer; Tera's choice to evict	Tera; Tychon's choice to evict	Tychon; 6 votes to win

Notes

- ^Note 1: When the cast was revealed, voting opened for Canada to vote for two Team Captains. Kiefer and Tina were voted captains and chose their teams. The captains were also given immunity from the first eviction.
- ^Note 2: On Night 1, the HouseGuests competed in a team competition. The winning team won immunity from the first eviction, while the members of the losing team (excluding their captain) were all nominated for the first eviction. Since there were six nominees, all nominees voted. As the winning captain, Tina would only vote in the event of a tie.
- ^Note 3: This week, the Head of Household was invisible. The winner of the HoH competition would not be announced to the HouseGuests, and their nominations would be made in secret. Additionally, to disguise the Invisible HoH, they were eligible to compete for the Power of Veto, and could compete the following week to be HoH; however, they were also eligible to be a Have-Not, and did not have access to the HoH Suite.
- ^Note 4: This week was a double eviction week. Following the first eviction, the remaining HouseGuests played a week's worth of games, including HoH and Veto competitions and Nomination, Veto and Eviction ceremonies, during the remainder of the live show, culminating in a second eviction for the night.
- ^Note 5: This week was a fake double eviction night. Following the first eviction, the remaining HouseGuests played a week's worth of games, including HoH and PoV competitions, and Nomination, Veto, and Eviction ceremonies, during the remainder of the live show, culminating in two HouseGuests being voted out. HouseGuests who were voted out (Jedson & Tera) were secretly moved to the HoH suite until the end of the night when the pair competed in a competition to determine which of the two would be evicted. Tera won the competition, evicting Jedson.
- ^Note 6: During the finale, the Jury voted for which finalist should win Big Brother Canada 9.

== Have-Nots ==
At the start of each week, a group of HouseGuests are selected to become the Have-Nots for the week. Those selected to be the Have-Nots are restricted to a slop diet and cold showers, and are required to sleep in an uncomfortable room. Each week, a "Skip the Slop" online public vote is held. The winner of the vote (indicated by ~~strikethrough~~) will receive a free meal from SkipTheDishes and have their Have-Not status nullified for the remainder of the week. The vote was held every week where Have-Nots were named, with the exception of Week 5.

Summary of HouseGuests who became Have-Nots each week.
	Week 1	Week 2	Week 3	Week 4	Week 5	Week 6	Week 7	Week 8	Week 9	Week 10
Have-Nots	none		Austin, ~~Breydon~~, Kyle, Rohan	~~Rohan~~, Tera, Tina, Victoria	Austin, Breydon, Kiefer, Victoria	Breydon, ~~Rohan~~, Tera, Tina	none	Beth, Jedson, ~~Tychon~~	Beth, ~~Kiefer~~	none

== Production ==
=== Development ===
Following the cancellation of the eighth season due to the COVID-19 pandemic, the future of the show was left uncertain, however on July 13, 2020, Big Brother Canada was renewed for a ninth season. It was also announced that Arisa Cox would return as host and would assume the role of executive producer for the new season. Casting began on August 10, 2020, with Kassting Inc. returning to provide casting services for the show. On February 17, 2021, Global announced that the season will start airing with a two-night premiere on March 3–4, 2021.

=== Twists ===
==== Team twist ====
For the first time in Big Brother Canada, the HouseGuests will compete in two teams (known as Team Destiny & Team Defender). The teams were selected by Team Captains determined by Canada's Vote, which opened as the cast was revealed. The Captains are also awarded immunity for the first week. For the duration of the teams phase the Head of Household would win immunity for their entire team. The draft for the teams was as follows:

Round	Team Defender	Team Destiny
Captain	Kiefer	Tina
1	Jedson	Tychon
2	Latoya	Tera
3	Josh	Kyle
4	Julie	Beth
5	Rohan	Victoria
6	Breydon	Austin

=== Release ===
The free 24/7 live feeds, hosted on Big Brother Canada's website, started on March 4 after the first eviction episode. A tribute to Big Brother Canada 4 HouseGuest Nikki Grahame aired on the 18th episode following her death.

=== Production design ===
Taken from the ground level of the house, the intended post-apocalyptic theme can be seen by the overgrown vines throughout the house.

On February 22, 2021, Global released an image of the living room wall. The theme for the season was confirmed to be post-apocalyptic. The full house design was revealed on March 1, with most of the house being similar to the season 8 superhero themed house, but with decorative fake vines and overgrowth covering large portions of the house. The bathroom, the HoH bedroom the outdoor spa area, and the Expedia-themed lounge room remained the same as last season. Of the few rooms to be completely redesigned was the main bedrooms, which were redecorated to correspond the theme of each team. The swamp themed Have-Not room was replaced by a ball-pit. Additionally, there was no nomination room, with the space normally taken by the nomination room being used as a OLG themed games room.

=== Prizes ===
The HouseGuests competed for a grand prize of a $110,000 cash prize (consisting of the base prize of $100,000 with an additional $10,000 provided by sponsor Sunlight), $10,000 worth of grills and grilling accessories from Weber, and a vacation for two from Expedia. The runner-up wins $20,000. A new prize for "Canada's Favourite Houseguest" was also introduced this season, where the Canadian public voted for the recipient of a $10,000 prize.

== Reception ==
=== Critical reception ===
Big Brother Canada 9 was generally well received by critics and viewers, with praise being directed at the diverse cast and the unpredictability of the course of the season. Justin Carreiro of the Young Folks wrote a positive review of the season, stating that it was a "fun and captivating season that gave fans exactly what we needed".

=== Controversy ===
Big Brother Canada
(@BigBrotherCA)
tweeted:

While much of what has been brought to our attention remains unproven, we cannot proceed with casting this person and this individual will be replaced ahead of the season premiere.

25 Feb 2021

On February 24, 2021, Global announced 22-year-old Ethan Quance, a line cook from Banff, Alberta as one of the fourteen HouseGuests competing in the ninth season. However the following day, several allegations were made against him including sexual assault and the use of racist and homophobic language. As a result, Global made the decision to remove Quance from the cast and announced that he would be replaced prior to the premiere. He was replaced with Kyle Moore.

=== Viewing figures ===
No.	Episode	Air Date	Viewers (AMA (Note: Average minute audience (AMA) is the average number of individuals or (homes or target group) viewing a TV channel, which is calculated per minute during a specified period of time over the program duration.) in millions)	Rank (week)	Refs.
1	"Episode 1"	Wednesday, March 3, 2021	1.107	15	—
2	"Episode 2"	Thursday, March 4, 2021	0.970	22	—
3	"Episode 3"	Monday, March 8, 2021	0.925	26	—
4	"Episode 4"	Wednesday, March 10, 2021	1.067	16	
5	"Episode 5"	Thursday, March 11, 2021	0.893	29	
6	"Episode 6"	Monday, March 15, 2021	0.883	22	
7	"Episode 7"	Wednesday, March 17, 2021	1.067	15	—
8	"Episode 8"	Thursday, March 18, 2021	0.867	24	—
9	"Episode 9"	Monday, March 22, 2021	0.998	21	—
10	"Episode 10"	Wednesday, March 24, 2021	0.988	22	—
11	"Episode 11"	Thursday, March 25, 2021	0.863	27	—
12	"Episode 12"	Monday, March 29, 2021	0.958	24	—
13	"Episode 13"	Wednesday, March 31, 2021	0.902	26	—
14	"Episode 14"	Thursday, April 1, 2021	0.914	25	—
15	"Episode 15"	Monday, April 5, 2021	<0.850	—N/a	—
16	"Episode 16"	Wednesday, April 7, 2021	0.928	26	
17	"Episode 17"	Thursday, April 8, 2021	0.869	28	
18	"Episode 18"	Monday, April 12, 2021	0.900	28	
19	"Episode 19"	Wednesday, April 14, 2021	<0.865	—N/a	
20	"Episode 20"	Thursday, April 15, 2021	0.865	30	
21	"Episode 21"	Monday, April 19, 2021	0.935	26	
22	"Episode 22"	Wednesday, April 21, 2021	0.891	28	—
23	"Episode 23"	Thursday, April 22, 2021	1.015	24	—
24	"Episode 24"	Monday, April 26, 2021	1.012	21	—
25	"Episode 25"	Wednesday, April 28, 2021	0.971	26	—
26	"Episode 26"	Thursday, April 29, 2021	0.955	27	—
27	"Episode 27"	Monday, May 3, 2021	0.979	27	—
28	"Episode 28"	Wednesday, May 5, 2021	0.977	28	—
29	"Episode 29"	Thursday, May 6, 2021	<0.953	—N/a	—
