= Big Brother Canada =

Canadian reality television series

- Logo used for the CTV iteration.
- Genre: Reality competition
- Based on: Big Brother by John de Mol Jr.
- Presented by: Arisa Cox Andrea Bain
- Country of origin: Canada
- Original language: English
- No. of seasons: 12
- No. of episodes: 333

Production
- Executive producers: John Brunton (2013-2024); Erin Brock (2013-2024); Eric Abboud (2013-2024); Arisa Cox (2021-2024); Eric Young (2027-); Nathalie Brigitte Bustos (2027-)
- Production locations: Toronto, Ontario (2013-2024); Montreal, Quebec (2027-)
- Camera setup: Multi-camera
- Running time: 60 minutes
- Production companies: Insight Productions (2013-2024) (In association with Corus Entertainment and Banijay); Groupe Entourage (2027-)

Original release
- Network: Slice
- Release: February 27, 2013 – May 8, 2014
- Network: Global
- Release: March 23, 2015 – May 8, 2024
- Network: CTV

Related
- Companion shows; Big Brother Canada After Dark; Parent show; Big Brother (American TV series); Related; Big Brother Quebec; Big Brother Célébrités

Big Brother Canada is a Canadian television reality game show based on the Dutch show of the same name, and the English-Canadian version of the Big Brother franchise.

Following the format originated by the American version of the show, the show features a group of contestants, known as "HouseGuests" who live together in a specially constructed house that is isolated from the outside world. The housemates are continuously monitored during their stay in the house by live television cameras as well as personal audio microphones. Throughout the course of the competition, the houseguests compete in challenges to win power and safety before voting to evict each other from the house – eliminating them from the competition. The last remaining houseguest wins the competition and is awarded the grand prize. The series is named after George Orwell's novel Nineteen Eighty-Four from Big Brother.

The series was originally produced by Endemol and Insight Productions for Shaw Media and Corus Entertainment and hosted by Arisa Cox (who also acted as executive producer between 2021 and 2024), with the first season premiering on February 27, 2013, on Slice. From the third season, the show aired on Global. The series was put on hiatus following the conclusion of the fifth season, but fan support saw the series renewed for a sixth season. The twelfth and final season of this iteration aired in early 2024, with the series cancelled in June 2024.

In 2026, a revival of the franchise was announced, to be produced by Groupe Entourage for Bell Media, hosted by Andrea Bain. The revival is set to premiere on CTV in the spring of 2027. It is set to act as a sister show to the French-Canadian celebrity edition, titled Big Brother Célébrités, with both being produced by Entourage for CTV and Noovo, out of the same house and production facilities in Montreal.

== Rules and format ==
There are a number of rules imposed on the HouseGuests competing in the series. The participants are under constant audio and video surveillance, and are required to wear personal microphones at all times. Contestants have no access to phones, television, internet, magazines, newspaper, and are prohibited from contact with those not in the house. Described as a "social experiment", the concept of the show forces people to live in a home with people who may share differing ideals, beliefs, or prejudices. The doors to the house remain locked at all times, though a HouseGuest is free to quit the game whenever they choose; however, once leaving the house, they are not permitted to re-enter. Should a contestant break the rules of the game, they could be expelled and immediately removed from the house. Unlike other versions of Big Brother, the HouseGuests may discuss the nomination and eviction process openly and freely.

Each week, the HouseGuests compete in several competitions in order to win power and safety inside the house, before voting off one of the HouseGuests during the eviction. The main elements of the format are as follows:

- Head of Household (HoH): At the start of each week in the house, the HouseGuests compete for the title of Head of Household, often shortened to simply HoH. The Head of Household for each week is given luxuries such as their own personal bedroom and the use of an MP3 player, but is responsible for nominating two of their fellow HouseGuests for eviction. The Head of Household would not be able to compete in the following week's Head of Household competition; this excludes the final Head of Household competition of the season.
- Power of Veto (PoV): After the nominees are determined, the Power of Veto competition is played, with the winner receiving the Power of Veto. If a HouseGuest chooses to exercise the Power of Veto, the Head of Household is responsible for naming a replacement nominee. The holder of the Power of Veto is safe from being nominated as the replacement nominee.
  - Veto Players: During seasons 1–6, only six HouseGuests competed for the Power of Veto each week; the Head of Household and both nominees would be guaranteed to play, alongside three others selected by a random draw. From season 7 onwards, there would only be 5 veto players (2 nominees, and 3 randomly drawn HouseGuests) with the HoH prohibited from playing until the Final 5 round.
- Eviction: On eviction night, all HouseGuests must vote to evict one of the nominees, with the exception of the nominees and the Head of Household. The eviction vote is by secret ballot, with HouseGuests casting their votes orally in the Diary Room. In the event of a tied vote, the Head of Household will cast a tie-breaking vote publicly. The nominee with the majority of the votes to evict is evicted from the house.

Upon reaching the middle point in the game, the evicted HouseGuests go on to become members of the "Jury"; the jury is responsible for choosing who wins the series. The members of the Jury remain sequestered from the outside world and usually live in a remote villa until Finale Night. The jury are not shown any Diary Room interviews or any footage that may include strategy or details regarding nominations. The amount of HouseGuest serving as Juror has varied throughout the series but will typically involve the last 7 evicted HouseGuests. The final Head of Household competition is split into three parts; the winners of the first two rounds compete in the third and final round. The Final Head of Household will solely determine the final evictee. Once only two HouseGuests remain, the jury members cast their votes for who should win the series.

== History ==
The Big Brother franchise was first seen in Canada in 2000, after Global acquired the rights to air the United States edition from CBS. The series has also been broadcast on the former sister network, CH. A French-Canadian version of Loft Story, the France-produced version of the series, premiered in 2003. The show was succeeded by an official Quebec-produced edition of Big Brother in 2010, which aired for one season.

=== Global/Slice iteration (2013–2024) ===
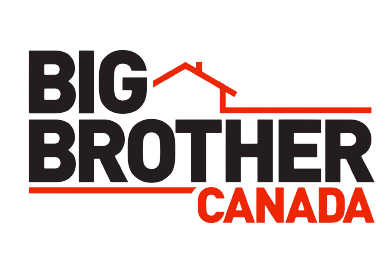
Logo during the Global/Slice iteration

Global's then-parent company, Shaw Media, announced on May 30, 2012, that an English adaptation of the series would launch in Canada on the cable channel Slice. The network later confirmed that live feeds from the Big Brother house would be available to Canadian viewers for free, unlike the subscription-based United States edition. Big Brother Canada was initially set to premiere on February 18, 2013; this was later pushed back to February 27. The show was greenlit for a second season following the ratings success of the first; a new house was built prior to the launch of the second season. It was confirmed after the conclusion of the second season that the show would be moving to Global.

Following the show's fifth season, it was announced by Global that the series had been placed on an indefinite hiatus for undisclosed reasons. The announcement led to backlash from fans of the series, who petitioned to bring the show back on air. Less than two months after the announcement, it was confirmed that the series would be returning for a sixth season in 2018 due to the large amount of fan support. Prior to the launch of the sixth season, a third House for the series was built with the same layout as the previous one. The seventh season of the series was confirmed by host Arisa Cox in June 2018. It premiered in March 2019.

Season 8 saw many series firsts for the Canadian franchise as two HouseGuests had to be removed due to a violation of house rules and production abruptly ended on March 24, 2020, due to the restrictions brought upon by the COVID-19 pandemic, culminating in a season finale airing on April 1, 2020, with no winner being proclaimed.

The series dropped the Live Feed component of the show with the eleventh season.

=== Hiatus ===
On June 27, 2024, the series was cancelled after twelve seasons due to a combination of factors, including declining audience trends, a need for more sponsor support, and rising production and licensing costs.

=== CTV iteration (2027) ===
On June 4, 2026, Bell Media announced a revival of the franchise. It is set to premiere in spring 2027, with casting details to be announced at a later date. Along with producing the local version, CTV also became the broadcaster of the American version from 2027, and episodes from the Global iteration will also be available on Crave. The new series will be produced by Groupe Entourage for CTV and Crave and hosted by Andrea Bain, a co-host of The Social. The revival series will serve as the English-language sister show to the French-Canadian edition, Big Brother Célébrités, with both being produced by Entourage for Bell Media.

== Series overview ==
Season	Episodes	Originally released			Days	HouseGuests	Winner	Runner-up	Final vote	Canada's Favourite Houseguest	Average viewers (millions)
Season	Episodes	First released	Last released	Network	Days	HouseGuests	Winner	Runner-up	Final vote	Canada's Favourite Houseguest	Average viewers (millions)
1	29	February 27, 2013	May 2, 2013	Slice	71	15	Jillian MacLaughlin	Gary Levy	4–3	—N/a	0.671
2	29	March 5, 2014	May 8, 2014	Slice	71	15 (Note: Fourteen HouseGuests entered the house on Day 1, while three additional contestants faced Canada's vote to decide who would be the final HouseGuest. The three contestants entered a secret room on Day 8, and the winning HouseGuest entered the house on Day 15.)	Jon Pardy	Sabrina Abbate	6–1 (Note: As part of a twist, Canada joined the jury as its seventh member. The recipient of the vote was determined by a public vote open to Canadian residents and was cast by Arisa Cox on behalf of the nation. Canada voted for Jon Pardy to be the winner.)	—N/a	0.667
3	29	March 23, 2015	May 27, 2015	Global	70	16	Sarah Hanlon	Godfrey Mangwiza	7–2 (Note: Ten evicted HouseGuests initially formed the jury, but the final three remaining HouseGuests were given the opportunity to select one juror's vote to disqualify.)	—N/a	1.120
4	32	March 2, 2016	May 12, 2016	Global	77	16 (Note: Fourteen HouseGuests entered the house on Day 1, while four former contestants of other editions of Big Brother faced Canada's vote to decide which two will enter the house as "international wildcards". These HouseGuests entered the house on Day 7. In a second twist, a pair of brothers played the game as one HouseGuest.)	Nick & Phil Paquette	Kelsey Faith	7–2 (Note: As a result of an exit caused by personal reasons, Canada replaced Ramsey Aburaneh on the jury as the ninth juror. The recipient of the vote was determined by a public vote open to Canadian residents and was cast by Aburaneh on behalf of the nation. Canada voted for Nick & Phil Paquette to be the winner.)	—N/a	1.185
5	29	March 15, 2017	May 18, 2017	Global	69	16 (Note: Eight of the HouseGuests this season were returning players from the first four seasons, while the other eight were new players.)	Kevin Martin	Karen Singbeil	9–0	—N/a	1.004
6	29	March 7, 2018	May 10, 2018	Global	69	16 (Note: Fourteen HouseGuests entered the house on Day 1, while the Canadian public voted between two sets of two contestants (one consisting of men and one consisting of women) to enter the house as the final two HouseGuests of the season. These HouseGuests entered on Day 6.)	Paras Atashnak	Kaela Grant	6–1	—N/a	1.118
7	29	March 6, 2019	May 9, 2019	Global	69	15 (Note: Fourteen HouseGuests entered the house on Day 1, while the Canadian public voted between two contestants to enter the house as the final HouseGuest of the season. This HouseGuest then had to complete a mission to officially enter the game.)	Dane Rupert	Anthony Douglas	7–0	—N/a	1.187
8	11	March 4, 2020	April 1, 2020	Global	25	16	Season discontinued (Note: The eighth season was planned to run for 83 days but production had to end early due to the COVID-19 pandemic. As a result, there was no winner as the game did not reach a conclusion. The CA$100,000 prize that would have gone to the winner went to a COVID-19 relief charity.)	Season discontinued	Season discontinued	—N/a	1.205
9	29	March 3, 2021	May 6, 2021	Global	69	14	Tychon Carter-Newman	Breydon White	6–1	Kiefer Collison	0.944
10	29	March 2, 2022	May 5, 2022	Global	69	16	Kevin Jacobs	Josh Nash	8–1 (Note: As part of a twist, Canada joined the jury as its ninth member. The recipient of the vote was determined by a public vote open to Canadian residents and was cast by Arisa Cox on behalf of the nation. Canada voted for Kevin Jacobs to be the winner.)	Marty Frenette	0.881
11	29	March 8, 2023	May 11, 2023	Global	69	16	Terrell "Ty" McDonald	Claudia Campbell	8–1	Jonathan Leonard	0.707
12	29	March 5, 2024	May 8, 2024	Global	69	14 (Note: Two of the HouseGuests this season were returning players, while the other 12 were new players.)	Bayleigh Pelham	Anthony Douglas	6–1	Todd Clements	0.410

== Notable contestants ==
In total, there have been 164 HouseGuests to compete in Big Brother Canada. In addition to this, there have been seven potential HouseGuests that did not enter the house and eight HouseGuests that have competed in two seasons. Season one HouseGuests Jillian MacLaughlin and Emmett Blois went on to participate in the fourth season of The Amazing Race Canada; the duo came in second place. Blois later went on to enter the Big Brother Mzansi house in South Africa as a guest; he remained in house for a week, attempting to cause trouble among the contestants. Demetres Giannitsos and Dane Rupert hold the record for the most Head of Household wins in a single season with five, while Kevin Martin, Adam Pike and combined HouseGuests Nick & Phil Paquette hold the record for most Power of Veto wins in a single season with four. Giannitsos, Martin, Paquette brothers, Pike, and Rupert are all also tied for the most total competition wins in a single season, with seven each. Martin, alongside HouseGuests Ashleigh Wood, Kaela Grant, Rohan Kapoor and Todd Clements are the only HouseGuests to win three consecutive Power of Veto competitions. Anthony Douglas has spent the most time in the house of any HouseGuest, with a total of 138 days. Douglas is also the first contestant to make it to Final 2 in two seasons and was runner-up for both. Season 9 winner Tychon Carter-Newman is the first black houseguest to win Big Brother Canada, and the second (after Celebrity Big Brother 2 winner Tamar Braxton) to win a season of Big Brother in North America.

== Companion shows ==
Following the announcement of the series, it was confirmed that the spin-off series Big Brother Canada: After Dark, would air alongside the show. Originating from the United States show of the same name, it provided a live look into the house and aired on Slice. The series began airing exclusively online following the fourth season. The Big Brother Side Show began airing alongside the second season of the show in 2014. Originally hosted by Cox alongside former HouseGuests Gary Levy and Peter Brown, the show featured interviews with the weekly evicted HouseGuest and aired immediately following the eviction episodes. It was confirmed in 2016 that Sarah Hanlon would replace Levy as co-host of the series. The show was cancelled in 2017 prior to the fifth season of Big Brother Canada, and was replaced instead by a Facebook chat with Cox following each eviction episode.

== Reception ==
Since its premiere in 2013, Big Brother Canada has been met with a positive reaction from viewers. Calum Marsh with National Post called the show "one of the most thrilling things on television" following the conclusion of the sixth season. The show was a ratings success during its run on Slice, with the first three episodes of the season causing a 24% increase in Slice's viewership. The show averaged 2.7 million viewers per week, at one point reaching a peak of 4.2 million in one week. The second season reached more than 6.4 million viewers during its run, becoming the number one specialty reality program of the year in key demographics. It was reported that the show's official website was visited more than 46 million times during the season. The show's seventh season saw the highest overall average for the series in terms of ratings, while season two was the least viewed season.

The show has been compared positively to the United States edition of the series on which it is based, with several fans and publications citing it as the superior series. The sophomore season was ranked as the fourth best North American season by BuzzFeed in 2018, with the fifth season coming in seventh place. Producer Trevor Boris has been praised for his role in the series, including producing the challenges and voicing the recurring character Marsha the Moose. He later went on to work on adaptions of the show in the United States and the United Kingdom. The series has received criticism for issues such as blocking the live feeds from viewers for long periods of time and for being seemingly "over-produced". Since it debuted, Big Brother Canada has been nominated for a total of fourteen Canadian Screen Awards, winning Best Production Design or Art Design in a Non-Fiction Program or Series at the 2015 ceremony. It has also been nominated for two Canadian Cinema Editors Awards, once in 2016 and once in 2017.

=== Accolades ===
==== Canadian Screen Awards ====
Year	Category	Nominee	Result
2014	Host in a Variety, Lifestyle, Reality/Competition, Performing Arts or Talk Program or Series	Arisa Cox	Nominated
2014	Production design/art direction in a non-fiction program or series	"Evil Dead"	Nominated
2014	Best Cross-Platform Project – Non-Fiction		Nominated
2016	Best Cross-Platform Project – Non-Fiction		Nominated
2016	Golden Screen Award for TV Reality Show		Nominated
2016	Editing in a reality or competition program or series	"Finale"	Nominated
2016	Production design/art direction in a non-fiction program or series	"Finale"	Nominated
2017	Reality/Competition Program or Series		Nominated
2017	Golden Screen Award for TV Reality Show		Nominated
2017	Editing in a reality or competition program or series	"Finale"	Nominated
2017	Production design/art direction in a non-fiction program or series	"Premiere"	Nominated
2017	Reality or competition program or series	"Finale"	Nominated
2018	Reality/Competition Program or Series		Nominated
2018	Editing in a reality or competition program or series	"Premiere"	Nominated
2018	Production design/art direction in a non-fiction program or series	"Finale"	Won
2019	Reality/Competition Program or Series		Nominated
2019	Editing in a reality or competition program or series		Nominated
2019	Production design/art direction in a non-fiction program or series		Nominated
2019	Lifestyle or reality/competition program or series	"Finale"	Nominated
2020	Reality/Competition Program or Series		Nominated
2020	Picture Editing, Reality/Competition	"Finale"	Nominated
2020	Production Design or Art Direction, Non-Fiction	"Finale"	Nominated
2021	Host or presenter, factual or reality/competition series	Arisa Cox	Nominated
2021	Editing in a reality or competition program or series	"Episode 11"	Nominated
2021	Production design/art direction in a non-fiction program or series	"Episode 1"	Nominated
2021	Reality or competition program or series	"Episode 1"	Nominated
2021	Audience Choice	Arisa Cox	Nominated
2022	Reality/Competition Program or Series		Nominated
2022	Host or presenter, factual or reality/competition	Arisa Cox	Nominated
2022	Photography in a lifestyle or reality program or series	"Premiere"	Won
2022	Editing in a reality or competition program or series	"Finale"	Nominated
2022	Production design/art direction in a non-fiction program or series	"Premiere"	Nominated
2022	Audience Choice		Nominated

==== International Emmy Awards ====
Year	Category	Nominee	Result
2025	Best Non-Scripted Entertainment		Nominated

== International broadcast ==
The series airs on the following channels outside of Canada:

- In Australia, season 9 was made available to stream on 7plus in November 2021. Season 10 started streaming in late March 2022 with episodes being uploaded weekly.
- In the United States, the series, excluding season 8, was added to Paramount+ on 16 February 2022.
