= Arisa Cox =

Canadian television and radio personality

- Born: Arisa Natalie Cox; December 7, 1978 (age 47); Toronto, Ontario, Canada
- Occupation: Television Host
- Years active: 2001-present
- Children: 3

Arisa Cox (born December 7, 1978) is a Canadian television and radio personality, best known as the host of Big Brother Canada. Cox was born in Toronto, Ontario.

Attending Carleton University's journalism program, Cox first came to prominence as an on-air reporter for CTV Ottawa, then as a participant in the first season of U8TV: The Lofters, and later worked as a creative producer, entertainment and weather reporter for A-Channel Ottawa, as an entertainment reporter for The A-List and The Gill Deacon Show. She has also appeared as an actor in Instant Star, Camp Rock 2: The Final Jam, The Smart Woman Survival Guide and the CBC mini-series Guns.

From September 2007 to August 2009, Cox co-hosted the entertainment newsmagazine E! News Weekend on the now defunct E! Canada. Her cohost on E! News Weekend, Jason Ruta, was also a former U8TV lofter, who appeared during that show's second season. Following the end of that show's run, she became an arts and entertainment reporter for CBC News Network.

On January 21, 2013, Cox was announced as the host of Big Brother Canada and in 2020, she was promoted to executive producer as of Season 9. In May 2013, Cox was announced as the new cohost of the morning show on CHBN-FM in Edmonton, Alberta. She began her job at The Bounce on July 8 during the morning show with Ara.

In 2018, she starred as Brock St. Regis in the TV movie Christmas with a View.

On June 26, 2024, she announced on Instagram that Big Brother Canada would not be renewed for a 13th season.
