= List of Big Brother Canada houseguests =

Big Brother Canada is a reality game show that began airing in 2013 on Slice, and later on Global. The series is part of the global Big Brother franchise. Contestants on the show, referred to as HouseGuests, compete for a $100,000 prize among other luxuries. Since its inception, the show has had a total of one hundred six official HouseGuests over the course of eight seasons. Of these contestants, forty-five were men while forty-five were women. Two brothers competed as one HouseGuest during the fourth season, while seven potential HouseGuests failed to gain access to the house throughout the show.

== HouseGuests ==
Contestant played the game for a second time.
Contestant played the game in another country prior to appearing on the Canadian edition.

Season	Name	Age^{1}	Hometown^{1}	Profession^{1}	Status	Finish
1	Katherine "Kat" Yee	27	Toronto, Ontario	Bartender	Evicted: Day 8	15th
1	Danielle Alexander	20	Calgary, Alberta	Aspiring Actress	Evicted: Day 15	14th
1	Aneal Ramkissoon	21	Halifax, Nova Scotia	Student	Evicted: Day 22	13th
1	Thomas "Tom" Plant	25	Edmonton, Alberta	Firefighter	Evicted: Day 29	12th
1	Liza Stinton	29	Toronto, Ontario	Tanning Salon Owner	Evicted: Day 29	11th
1	Suzette Amaya	36	Vancouver, British Columbia	Radio Show Host & Motivational Speaker	Evicted: Day 36	10th
1	Anuj "AJ" Burman	32	Scarborough, Ontario	Director of Business Development	Evicted: Day 43	9th
1	Alec Beall	27	Vancouver, British Columbia	Social Psychology Student	Evicted: Day 50	8th
1	Emerald "Topaz" Brady	27	Scarborough, Ontario	Dental Hygienist	Evicted: Day 50	7th
1	Peter Brown	26	Nackawic-Millville, New Brunswick	Web Content Curator	Evicted: Day 57	6th
1	Andrew Monaghan	38	Halifax, Nova Scotia	Insurance Sales Trainer	Evicted: Day 64	5th
1	Talla Rejaei	26	Edmonton, Alberta	Independent Living Support	Evicted: Day 67	4th
1	Emmett Blois	25	Gore, Nova Scotia	Dairy Farmer	Evicted: Day 71	3rd
1	Gary Levy	21	Toronto, Ontario	Fashion Stylist Assistant	Finalist: Day 71	2nd
1	Jillian MacLaughlin	27	New Glasgow, Nova Scotia	Teacher	Finalist: Day 71	1st
2	Anick Gervais	28	Hanmer, Ontario	Reiki Master	Evicted: Day 8	15th
2	Kyle Shore	24	Porters Lake, Nova Scotia	Personal Trainor	Evicted: Day 15	14th
2	Paul Jackson	43	Toronto, Ontario	Motivational Speaker & Consultant	Evicted: Day 22	13th
2	Ika Wong	29	Thornhill, Ontario	Hair Stylist	Evicted: Day 29	12th
2	Andrew James Gordon	27	Calgary, Alberta	Restaurant Manager	Evicted: Day 36	11th
2	Sarah Miller	32	Langley, British Columbia	Mortgage Broker	Evicted: Day 43	10th
2	Kenneth "Kenny" Brain	25	Montreal, Quebec	Model	Evicted: Day 43	9th
2	Arlie Shaban	25	Stouffville, Ontario	Unemployed	Evicted: Day 50	8th
2	Allison White	25	St. John's, Newfoundland	Registered Nurse	Evicted: Day 51	7th
2	Rachelle Diamond	20	Edmonton, Alberta	College Student	Evicted: Day 57	6th
2	Adel Elseri	27	Edmonton, Alberta	Inventor & Welder	Evicted: Day 64	5th
2	Heather Decksheimer	23	Edmonton, Alberta	Modelling Agency Coordinator	Evicted: Day 67	4th
2	Neda Kalantar	22	Vancouver, British Columbia	Freelance Fashion Stylist	Evicted: Day 71	3rd
2	Sabrina Abbate	25	Montreal, Quebec	Makeup Artist & Hair Stylist	Finalist: Day 71	2nd
2	Jon Pardy	23	Clarenville, Newfoundland	College Student	Finalist: Day 71	1st
3	Patricia "Risha" Denner	41	Toronto, Ontario	Waitress	Evicted: Day 7	16th
3	Naeha Sareen	29	Toronto, Ontario	Chiropractor & Entrepreneur	Evicted: Day 15	15th
3	Graig Merritt	36	Pitt Meadows, British Columbia	Professional Baseball Scout & Coach	Evicted: Day 21	14th
3	Johnny Colatruglio	26	Winnipeg, Manitoba	IT Project Manager	Evicted: Day 28	13th
3	Jordan Parhar	21	Cloverdale, British Columbia	College Student	Evicted: Day 35	12th
3	Sindy Nguyen	25	Huntsville, Ontario	Assistant Cruise Director & Pageant Queen	Evicted: Day 42	11th
3	Bobby Hlad	27	Oakville, Ontario	Rock Climbing Instructor	Evicted: Day 49	10th
3	Kevin Martin	22	Calgary, Alberta	Professional Poker Player	Evicted: Day 49	9th
3	Willow MacDonald	26	Calgary, Alberta	Sales & Marketing Representative	Evicted: Day 49	8th
3	Bruno Ielo	31	Ottawa, Ontario	Construction Worker	Evicted: Day 56	7th
3	Zachary "Zach" Oleynik	22	Regina, Saskatchewan	University Student	Evicted: Day 63	6th
3	Pilar Nemer	22	Dartmouth, Nova Scotia	College Student	Evicted: Day 63	5th
3	Brittnee Blair	25	Calgary, Alberta	Plus-Size Model	Evicted: Day 66	4th
3	Ashleigh Wood	21	Calgary, Alberta	Unemployed	Evicted: Day 70	3rd
3	Godfrey Mangwiza	22	Toronto, Ontario	Psychology Student	Finalist: Day 70	2nd
3	Sarah Hanlon	27	Toronto, Ontario	Cannabis Vapor Lounge Hemployee	Finalist: Day 70	1st
4	Paige Distranski	19	Thunder Bay, Ontario	Veterinarian Tech Assistant	Evicted: Day 7	16th
4	Sharry Ash	30	Toronto, Ontario	Customer Service Supervisor	Evicted: Day 14	15th
4	Christine Kelsey	47	Vancouver, British Columbia	Housekeeper	Evicted: Day 21	14th
4	Dallas Cormier	24	Saint John, New Brunswick	Welder	Evicted: Day 35	13th
4	Loveita Adams	25	Fort McMurray, Alberta	Entrepreneur	Evicted: Day 35	12th
4	Mitchell "Mitch" Moffit	27	Guelph, Ontario	YouTube personality	Evicted: Day 42	11th
4	Raul Manriquez	21	Calgary, Alberta	Fashion Stylist	Evicted: Day 49	10th
4	Ramsey Aburaneh	26	Toronto, Ontario	Digital Marketing	Walked: Day 52	9th
4	Madelyn "Maddy" Pavle	21	Vancouver, British Columbia	Server	Evicted: Day 56	8th
4	Jared Kesler	24	Winnipeg, Manitoba	Pipeline Worker	Evicted: Day 63	7th
4	Nikki Grahame†	33	London, England	TV Personality	Evicted: Day 63	6th
4	Joel Lefevre	33	Edmonton, Alberta	Actor	Evicted: Day 70	5th
4	Cassandra Shahinfar	22	Winnipeg, Manitoba	Social Media Strategist	Evicted: Day 72	4th
4	Tim Dormer	31	Sydney, New South Wales	TV & Radio Personality	Evicted: Day 77	3rd
4	Kelsey Faith	25	Calgary, Alberta	Flight Attendant & Bartender	Finalist: Day 77	2nd
4	Nick & Phil Paquette	20 & 21	Ottawa, Ontario	Student & DJ	Finalist: Day 77	1st
5	Mark Chrysler	24	Edmonton, Alberta	Bartender	Evicted: Day 6	16th
5	Dallas Cormier	25	Edmonton, Alberta	Lobster Fisherman & Welder	Evicted: Day 13	15th
5	Cassandra Shahinfar	23	Winnipeg, Manitoba	Marketing Manager	Evicted: Day 20	14th
5	Gary Levy	25	Ajax, Ontario	Artist	Evicted: Day 27	13th
5	Emily Hawkin	23	Toronto, Ontario	Musician & Server	Evicted: Day 34	12th
5	Neda Kalantar	25	Vancouver, British Columbia	Entrepreneur	Evicted: Day 34	11th
5	Sindy Nguyen	27	Toronto, Ontario	Beauty Queen	Evicted: Day 41	10th
5	Bruno Ielo	33	Ottawa, Ontario	Construction Worker	Evicted: Day 48	9th
5	Jackie McCurrach	22	Port Coquitlam, British Columbia	Professional Pizza Maker	Evicted: Day 55	8th
5	William Laprise Desbiens	23	Trois-Rivières, Quebec	Marketing Student & Blogger	Evicted: Day 55	7th
5	Andre "Dre" Gwenaelle	25	Montreal, Quebec	Masters Student	Evicted: Day 55	6th
5	Dillon Carman	30	Madoc, Ontario	Professional Boxer	Evicted: Day 62	5th
5	Ika Wong	32	Thornhill, Ontario	Financial Services Manager	Evicted: Day 64	4th
5	Demetres Giannitsos	25	Edson, Alberta	Oil Field Instrument Technician	Evicted: Day 69	3rd
5	Karen Singbeil	53	Victoria, British Columbia	Real Estate Broker	Finalist: Day 69	2nd
5	Kevin Martin	24	Calgary, Alberta	Professional Poker Player	Finalist: Day 69	1st
6	Rozina Yaqub	49	Toronto, Ontario	Religious Education	Evicted: Day 6	16th
6	Andrew Miller	36	Scarborough, Ontario	Small Business Owner	Evicted: Day 13	15th
6	Jesse Larson	24	Saskatoon, Saskatchewan	Sales Executive	Evicted: Day 20	14th
6	Veronica Doherty	24	Ottawa, Ontario	Student & Server	Evicted: Day 27	13th
6	Hamza Hatoum	27	Thunder Bay, Ontario	Soccer Coach	Evicted: Day 27	12th
6	Merron Haile	22	Edmonton, Alberta	Business Student	Evicted: Day 34	11th
6	Erica Hill	23	Pickering, Ontario	Server	Evicted: Day 41	10th
6	Ryan Ballantine	39	Calgary, Alberta	Fire Safety Technician	Evicted: Day 48	9th
6	Alejandra "Ali" Martinez	30	Vancouver, British Columbia	Personal Trainer	Evicted: Day 55	8th
6	Olivia Riemer	21	Guelph, Ontario	Student	Evicted: Day 55	7th
6	Johnny Mulder	28	Victoria, British Columbia	House Husband	Evicted: Day 55	6th
6	Madeline "Maddy" Poplett	25	Ottawa, Ontario	Bartender	Evicted: Day 62	5th
6	William "Will" Kenny	25	Trepassey, Newfoundland	Oil Field Technician	Evicted: Day 64	4th
6	Derek Kesseler	27	Beaumont, Alberta	Entrepreneur	Evicted: Day 69	3rd
6	Kaela Grant	25	Saint John, New Brunswick	Wine Ambassador	Finalist: Day 69	2nd
6	Paras Atashnak	23	Vancouver, British Columbia	Law Student	Finalist: Day 69	1st
7	Laura Roberts	26	Calgary, Alberta	Judicial Clerk	Evicted: Day 6	15th
7	Maki Moto	31	Toronto, Ontario	Poet, DJ	Evicted: Day 13	14th
7	Kailyn Archer	42	Grande Prairie, Alberta	Psychic	Evicted: Day 20	13th
7	Chelsea Bird	30	Edmonton, Alberta	Radio Host	Evicted: Day 27	12th
7	Eddie Lin	25	Montreal, Quebec	Cryptocurrency Developer	Evicted: Day 27	11th
7	Kiera "Kiki" Wallace	23	Port Moody, British Columbia	Bartender	Evicted: Day 34	10th
7	Samantha "Sam" Picco	30	Conception Bay South, Newfoundland and Labrador	Beauty Salon Owner	Evicted: Day 41	9th
7	Cory Kennedy	29	Sussex, New Brunswick	Middle School Teacher	Evicted: Day 48	8th
7	Estefania Hoyos	23	Gatineau, Quebec	Student	Evicted: Day 55	7th
7	Damien Ketlo	28	Nadleh Whut'en, British Columbia	Goalie Coach	Evicted: Day 55	6th
7	Mark Drelich	29	Edmonton, Alberta	Travel Guide	Evicted: Day 62	5th
7	Adam Pike	27	Spaniard's Bay, Newfoundland	Oil Field Worker	Evicted: Day 64	4th
7	Kyra Shenker	25	Montreal, Quebec	Bartender	Evicted: Day 69	3rd
7	Anthony Douglas	31	Richmond Hill, Ontario	Gas Inspector	Finalist: Day 69	2nd
7	Dane Rupert	27	Kelowna, British Columbia	Civil Technician	Finalist: Day 69	1st
8	Nico Vera	31	Toronto, Ontario	Sales Manager	Walked: Day 5	16th
8	Micheal Stubley	25	Prince George, British Columbia	Military Infantryman	Evicted: Day 13	15th
8	Jamar Lee	23	Ajax, Ontario	Warehouse Worker	Expelled: Day 18	14th
8	Kyle Rozendal	31	Okotoks, Alberta	Electrician	Expelled: Day 19	13th
8	Angela "Angie" Tackie	33	Winnipeg, Manitoba	Communications Officer	Season canceled due to COVID-19: Day 25	
8	Brooke Warnock	26	Calgary, Alberta	Social Support Worker	Season canceled due to COVID-19: Day 25	
8	Carol Rosher	44	Nanaimo, British Columbia	Disability Caregiver	Season canceled due to COVID-19: Day 25	
8	Christopher "Chris" Wyllie	28	Markham, Ontario	Brain Transformation Specialist	Season canceled due to COVID-19: Day 25	
8	Hira Deol	30	Brampton, Ontario	Accountant	Season canceled due to COVID-19: Day 25	
8	John Luke Kieper	22	Kamloops, British Columbia	Journalist	Season canceled due to COVID-19: Day 25	
8	Madeline Di Nunzio	30	Toronto, Ontario	Substitute Teacher	Season canceled due to COVID-19: Day 25	
8	Minh-Ly Nguyen-Cao	28	Montreal, Quebec	Flight Attendant	Season canceled due to COVID-19: Day 25	
8	Rianne Swanson	29	Chetwynd, British Columbia	Operating Room Nurse	Season canceled due to COVID-19: Day 25	
8	Sheldon Jean	24	Ottawa, Ontario	Professional Wrestler	Season canceled due to COVID-19: Day 25	
8	Susanne Fuda	24	Vaughan, Ontario	Corporate Recruiter	Season canceled due to COVID-19: Day 25	
8	Vanessa Clements	26	Mill River, Prince Edward Island	Lobster Fisherman	Season canceled due to COVID-19: Day 25	
9	Julie Vu	28	Vancouver, British Columbia	Social media influencer	Evicted: Day 6	14th
9	Josh Farnworth	30	New Westminster, British Columbia	Film production co-ordinator	Evicted: Day 13	13th
9	Latoya Anderson	34	Pickering, Ontario	Police officer	Evicted: Day 20	12th
9	Kyle Moore	26	Red Deer, Alberta	Hockey coach	Evicted: Day 27	11th
9	Austin Dookwah	23	Newmarket, Ontario	Realtor & model	Evicted: Day 34	10th
9	Victoria Woghiren	27	Hamilton, Ontario	Youth advocate	Evicted: Day 41	9th
9	Rohan Kapoor	26	Toronto, Ontario	Strategic partnerships manager	Evicted: Day 41	8th
9	Tina Thistle	42	Paradise, Newfoundland and Labrador	Graphic designer	Evicted: Day 48	7th
9	Jedson Tavernier	25	Aurora, Ontario	Personal trainer	Evicted: Day 55	6th
9	Beth Bieda	27	Tomahawk, Alberta	Homeless support worker	Evicted: Day 62	5th
9	Kiefer Collison	32	Old Massett, British Columbia	Radio host	Evicted: Day 64	4th
9	Tera Gillen-Patrozzi	37	LaSalle, Ontario	Full-time mom & spin instructor	Evicted: Day 69	3rd
9	Breydon White	23	Calgary, Alberta	Anthropology student	Finalist: Day 69	2nd
9	Tychon Carter-Newman	29	Montreal, Quebec	Urban planner	Finalist: Day 69	1st
10	Melina Mansing	29	Toronto, Ontario	Artist	Evicted: Day 6	16th
10	Jay Northcott	28	Toronto, Ontario	Theatre Director	Evicted: Day 13	15th
10	Stephanie Paterson	26	Toronto, Ontario	Child and Youth Worker	Evicted: Day 20	14th
10	Kyle Moore	23	Halifax, Nova Scotia	Podcaster	Evicted: Day 27	13th
10	Tynesha White	32	Montreal, Quebec	Model	Evicted: Day 34	12th
10	Jessica "Jess" Gowling	35	Cranbrook, British Columbia	Visual Artist	Evicted: Day 34	11th
10	Hermon Nizghi	29	Nanaimo, British Columbia	Auto Sales General Manager	Evicted: Day 41	10th
10	Mustafa "Moose" Bendago	24	Toronto, Ontario	Content Creator	Evicted: Day 48	9th
10	Steven "Gino" Giannopoulos	28	Laval, Quebec	Firefighter	Evicted: Day 55	8th
10	Summer Sayles	25	Toronto, Ontario	Funemployed	Evicted: Day 55	7th
10	Martin "Marty" Frenette	43	Petit-Rocher, New Brunswick	Fraud Investigator	Evicted: Day 55	6th
10	Jacey-Lynne Graham	24	Thunder Bay, Ontario	Social Media Manager	Evicted: Day 62	5th
10	Haleena Gill	27	Surrey, British Columbia	Master's Student	Evicted: Day 64	4th
10	Bethlehem "Betty" Yirsaw	31	Edmonton, Alberta	Human Resources Manager	Evicted: Day 69	3rd
10	Joshua "Josh" Nash	28	Vancouver, British Columbia	Pediatric Resident	Finalist: Day 69	2nd
10	Kevin Jacobs	28	Toronto, Ontario	Sales Engineer	Finalist: Day 69	1st
11	Amal Bashir	28	Toronto, Ontario	Superfan	Walked: Day 4	16th
11	John Michael Sosa	28	Bradford, Ontario	Project Manager	Evicted: Day 13	15th
11	Roberto Lopez	30	Toronto, Ontario	Gym Manager	Evicted: Day 20	14th
11	Vanessa MacTavish	42	Calgary Alberta	Yoga Instructor	Walked: Day 22	13th
11	Zach Neilson	32	Ottawa, Ontario	Senior vice president	Walked: Day 26	12th
11	Dan Szabo	28	Niagara Falls, Ontario	DJ	Evicted: Day 34	11th
11	Jonathan Leonard	33	Paradise, Newfoundland	Fisherman	Evicted: Day 41	10th
11	Santina Carlson	29	Edmonton, Alberta	Aesthetician	Evicted: Day 42	9th
11	Hope Agbolosoo	23	Milton, Ontario	Skills Coach	Evicted: Day 48	8th
11	Kuzivakwashe "Kuzie" Mujakachi	29	Victoria, British Columbia	9-1-1 Operator	Evicted: Day 55	7th
11	Shanaya Carter	27	Victoria, British Columbia	Bartender	Evicted: Day 55	6th
11	Renee Mior	24	Vaughan, Ontario	Law Student	Evicted: Day 60	5th
11	Anika Mysha	28	Saskatoon, Saskatchewan	Investment Advisor	Evicted: Day 63	4th
11	Daniel Clarke	33	Toronto, Ontario	Graphic designer	Evicted: Day 69	3rd
11	Claudia Campbell	25	Kensington, Prince Edward Island	Marketing coordinator	Finalist: Day 69	2nd
11	Terrell "Ty" McDonald	27	Toronto, Ontario	Personal Trainer	Finalist: Day 69	1st
12	Janine Holmes	44	Toronto, Ontario	Hair and make-up artist	Evicted: Day 13	14th
12	Donna Marshall	26	Hubbards, Nova Scotia	Artist	Evicted: Day 20	13th
12	Dinis Freitas	48	Toronto, Ontario	Textile Designer	Evicted: Day 27	12th
12	Vivek Sabbarwal	25	Saint John, New Brunswick	Software Developer	Evicted: Day 33	11th
12	Matthew Wong	27	Surrey, British Columbia	Kinesiologist	Evicted: Day 40	10th
12	Elijah Kazlauskas	31	North Bay, Ontario	ESL teacher	Evicted: Day 41	9th
12	Kayla Clennon	26	Stouffville, Ontario	Volleyball Coach	Evicted: Day 48	8th
12	Avery Martin	26	Selkirk, Manitoba	Videographer	Evicted: Day 55	7th
12	Tola Eam	40	Ottawa, Ontario	Fiber optic technician	Evicted: Day 55	6th
12	Victoria Woghiren	30	Hamilton, Ontario	Social Worker	Evicted: Day 60	5th
12	Todd Clements	31	Happy Valley-Goose Bay, Newfoundland and Labrador	General Contractor	Evicted: Day 63	4th
12	Lexus Jackson	24	Toronto, Ontario	Dental hygienist	Evicted: Day 69	3rd
12	Anthony Douglas	36	Richmond Hill, Ontario	Energy compliance	Finalist: Day 69	2nd
12	Bayleigh Pelham	34	Halifax, Nova Scotia	Bartender	Finalist: Day 69	1st

Notes

^Note 1: Information such as age, profession, and residence are at the time of entry in the house.

== Contestants competing in international versions ==
Name	Big Brother Canada history		Big Brother International history			
Name	Series	Status	Country	Series	Season(s)	Status
Nikki Grahame	Big Brother Canada 4	Evicted – 6th place	United Kingdom	Big Brother UK	Big Brother 7	Finalist – 5th place
Nikki Grahame	Big Brother Canada 4	Evicted – 6th place	United Kingdom	Big Brother UK	Ultimate Big Brother	Runner-up – 2nd place
Tim Dormer	Big Brother Canada 4	Evicted – 3rd place	Australia	Big Brother Australia	Big Brother 10	Winner – 1st place
Tim Dormer	Big Brother Canada 4	Evicted – 3rd place	Australia	Big Brother Australia	Big Brother 14	Evicted – 6th place

== Deaths ==
=== 2021 ===
- April 9 - Nikki Grahame, Big Brother Canada 4 houseguest. (b. 1982)
