= Big Brother Canada season 3 =

Big Brother Canada
- Season 3
- Big Brother Canada 3 title card
- Presented by: Arisa Cox
- No. of days: 70
- No. of houseguests: 16
- Winner: Sarah Hanlon
- Runner-up: Godfrey Mangwiza
- Companion shows: Big Brother Canada: After Dark; Big Brother: Side Show
- No. of episodes: 29

Release
- Original network: Global
- Original release: March 23 – May 27, 2015

Season chronology
- ← Previous; Season 2 Next → Season 4

Big Brother Canada 3 is the third season of the Canadian reality television series Big Brother Canada. The season began airing on March 23, 2015. It featured sixteen HouseGuests, an increase from the prior two seasons. The series moved to Global Television Network with this season, previously airing on the smaller Slice channel. The move resulted in an increase in ratings, making it the highest rated season at the time; it has since been surpassed by the fourth season. The house featured a "steampunk" theme, while the season featured more twists than its predecessors. It is the first season to feature a triple eviction, a twist that has been used in later seasons. Lasting for a total of ten weeks, the season concluded on May 27 when Sarah Hanlon was named the winner.

== HouseGuests ==
The cast of the third season of Big Brother Canada. From left to right: Jordan, Naeha, Brittnee, Johnny, Risha, Godfrey, Willow, Zach, Sarah, Graig, Bruno, Ashleigh, Kevin, Pilar, Bobby, and Sindy

The cast for season three was revealed on March 17, 2015.

Name	Age	Occupation	Residence	Entry	Result
Sarah Hanlon	27	Vapor Lounge employee	Toronto, Ontario	1	Winner; Day 70
Godfrey Mangwiza	22	Psychology student	Toronto, Ontario	1	Runner-up; Day 70
Ashleigh Wood	21	Unemployed	Calgary, Alberta	1	Evicted; Day 70
Brittnee Blair	25	Plus-size model	Calgary, Alberta	1	Evicted; Day 66
Pilar Nemer	22	College student	Dartmouth, Nova Scotia	1	Evicted; Day 63
Zach Oleynik	22	University student	Regina, Saskatchewan	1	Evicted; Day 63
Bruno Ielo	31	Construction worker	Ottawa, Ontario	1	Evicted; Day 56
Willow MacDonald	26	Sales & Marketing representative	Calgary, Alberta	1	Evicted; Day 49
Kevin Martin	22	Professional poker player	Calgary, Alberta	1	Evicted; Day 49
Bobby Hlad	27	Rock climbing instructor	Oakville, Ontario	1	Evicted; Day 49
Sindy Nguyen	25	Assistant cruise director & Pageant queen	Huntsville, Ontario	30	Evicted; Day 42
Sindy Nguyen	25	Assistant cruise director & Pageant queen	Huntsville, Ontario	1	Evicted; Day 14
Jordan Parhar	21	College student	Cloverdale, British Columbia	1	Evicted; Day 35
Johnny Colatruglio	26	IT project manager	Winnipeg, Manitoba	1	Evicted; Day 28
Graig Merritt	36	Professional baseball scout & Coach	Pitt Meadows, British Columbia	1	Evicted; Day 21
Naeha Sareen	29	Chiropractor & Entrepreneur	Toronto, Ontario	1	Evicted; Day 15
Patricia "Risha" Denner	41	Waitress	Toronto, Ontario	1	Evicted; Day 7

=== Future appearances ===
In 2017, HouseGuests Bruno Ielo, Kevin Martin, and Sindy Nguyen returned to compete on the show's fifth season.

In 2023, Godfrey Mangwiza appeared on the second season of Bachelor in Paradise Canada. In 2023, Kevin Martin competed on the first season of The Traitors Canada.

In 2024, Martin competed on The Amazing Race Canada 10.

In 2026, Brittnee Blair became the entertainment reporter for Global's The Morning Show afternoon edition, TMS2.

== Season summary ==
=== Days 1-28 ===
The sixteen HouseGuests moved into the House on 19 March, referred to as Day 1. The House was empty upon their entrance, and the contestants learned they would have to earn their belongings and furniture. In another twist, the HouseGuests were told that all of them were the Head of Household; each HouseGuest secretly nominated two HouseGuests, and the two with the most votes were the official nominations. Risha and Sindy became the nominees. Bobby, Kevin, Naeha, and Zach were chosen to compete for the Power of Veto alongside the nominees. Sindy won the "V Is For Veto" competition that night, and removed herself from the block. She was tasked with choosing a replacement nominee, and chose Pilar. Following a series of tasks, the HouseGuests earned the furniture and their belongings on Day 3. Kevin earned a $1,000 prize for sabotaging one of the tasks. Ashleigh, Bobby, Bruno, Graig, Willow, and Zach formed the Chop Shop alliance that same day. On Day 7, the HouseGuests learned that Canada had been given the power to evict one of the nominees; Risha was then evicted from the House.

Bobby won the "Wall to Wall" endurance Head of Household competition that night. Brittnee, Godfrey, Jordan, and Naeha became the Have-Nots after losing the "Have-Not Slop Off" competition on Day 8. Brittnee and Kevin were nominated for eviction on Day 9, as they were the first two to fall in the HoH competition. Johnny and Sindy were also on the shortlist. Though Kevin was the initial target, it shifted to Sindy after it was discovered she was attempting to form a female alliance. Godfrey, Willow, and Johnny were chosen to compete for the PoV this week; Kevin won the "Dam It!" Power of Veto competition that night. On Day 10, the HouseGuests passed a task and won a pool party. Kevin removed himself from the block on Day 11, with Sindy being nominated in his place. On Day 14, Sindy was evicted from the House in a unanimous vote. Kevin won the "Story Time" Head of Household competition that night and learned in The Vault he must immediately nominate two HouseGuests for an instant eviction. He chose to nominate Brittnee and Naeha, with the latter being his target.

The contestants learned of the nominations and twist the next day, and were required to cast their votes out loud; Naeha was evicted. HouseGuests competed in pairs that night in the "Switching Gears" Head of Household competition, which Brittnee and Sarah won. The duo chose Brittnee to be the HoH for the week. She was required to choose four Have-Nots for the week, and chose Ashleigh, Bobby, Kevin, and Zach. Brittnee nominated Bobby and Kevin on Day 16; Godfrey and Graig were also on the shortlist. Johnny, Sarah, and Zach were chosen to compete for this week's PoV; Johnny won the "Spooling Around" Power of Veto competition on Day 17. On Day 19, Johnny removed Kevin from the block allowing Brittnee to nominate Graig as her target. Later that day the HouseGuests competed in a task for a $1,000 prize and an advantage in the upcoming HoH competition; Zach was the winner. Brittnee, Johnny, Jordan, Kevin, Sarah, and Zach formed the Hexagon alliance. Graig became the fourth HouseGuest to be evicted from the House on Day 21. Bruno won the "Through the Wringer" HoH competition minutes later, which granted him a $5,000 prize as well as the title of Head of Household. On Day 22, Brittnee, Pilar, and Willow became Have-Nots after losing the "Game of Bones" competition. That night, Bruno chose to nominate Johnny and Sarah for eviction, with Johnny being the target as Bruno blamed him for Graig's eviction. Kevin and Zach were additionally on the shortlist this week.

This week's twist saw the viewers choosing to make the Power of Veto a forced or double Veto; the viewers chose double, meaning it could be used to save one, both, or neither nominee. On Day 24, Bruno won the "Game, Set, Match" Power of Veto competition. Bobby, Brittnee, and Kevin had been chosen to compete as well. Sarah was given a task on Day 25, which she completed and won the HouseGuests a prize. Bruno learned of the Power of Veto twist during the ceremony on Day 25, though chose to leave nominations the same. The HouseGuests participated in the BBTV task on Day 26, which saw former HouseGuest Jon Pardy entering the House as a guest. Johnny was evicted from the House on Day 28.

=== Days 28-49 ===
Following the eviction, Zach won the "Before or After" HoH competition. He named Bruno, Godfrey, Jordan, and Sarah the Have-Nots for the week. Zach nominated his target Godfrey against his closest ally Jordan on Day 29. Bobby and Bruno were also on the shortlist this week. The first five evicted HouseGuests competed to return to the House on Day 30 in the "On the Edge" competition; Sindy was the winner. She earned immunity for the week after successfully completing a task in The Vault. Ashleigh, Pilar, and Sarah were chosen to compete for the PoV; Zach won the Power of Veto in the "Ant Maze" competition that night. On Day 33, he chose to leave nominations intact. On Day 34, the HouseGuests chose Bobby and Sindy to participate in a task; the pair were locked in The Vault for twenty-four hours, with the option of taking $10,000 out of the prize and leaving immediately. Neither accepted the bribe. Sindy began working to secure the votes to evict Jordan from the House. On Day 35, Jordan was blindsided in a five to four eviction vote.

Following Jordan's eviction, Pilar became the new Head of Household after winning the "Student Film Fest" competition. Though Bruno and Bobby had worked with Brittnee, Sarah, and Sindy to evict Jordan, they turned on the trio immediately after. On Day 36, the HouseGuests competed in the "Bubble Ball" Have-Not competition; Brittnee, Godfrey, Kevin, and Sarah lost. Pilar chose to nominate Godfrey and Sindy for eviction that night, with Sindy being her target. Bobby and Willow were additionally on the shortlist. Godfrey won the "Big Brother Concentration" Power of Veto competition on Day 37. Bobby, Kevin, and Willow had also been chosen to compete. Bruno was given a secret task on Day 38, and won the House a reward. On Day 39, Godfrey chose to use the Power of Veto on himself, with Brittnee being nominated in his place. The HouseGuests completed another task on the following day involving treadmills. Sindy was evicted for a second time on Day 42. Kevin won the "Ratetribution" Head of Household competition minutes later. The group participated in a fortune telling task the next day, which resulted in Bobby, Willow, and Zach becoming Have-Nots for the week. Kevin chose to nominate Bobby and Brittnee for eviction that night, with Bruno and Godfrey being the additional HouseGuests on the shortlist.

Though Bobby believed that Godfrey was the target for the week, Kevin and the couples alliance hoped to see Bobby evicted. Ashleigh, Pilar, and Sarah were chosen to compete for the PoV; Kevin won the "Delivering the Goods" Power of Veto competition on Day 44, also winning a $10,000 gift card for The Brick. He chose to leave his nominations the same on Day 46. Bobby was evicted on Day 49. Brittnee won the "Talk of the Block" HoH competition minutes later, and the House learned of the triple eviction twist. The twist required Brittnee to nominate three HouseGuests; she chose Kevin, Pilar, and Zach. The twist deemed Brittnee ineligible to compete in the "Big Brother Workshop" PoV competition, which Ashleigh, Sarah, and Bruno were selected to compete in; Bruno won. He chose to remove Zach from the block, with Willow being nominated in his place. The remaining HouseGuests then voted to save one of the nominees, as opposed to voting to evict. The vote saw Kevin and Willow being evicted from the House, receiving zero and two votes to save, respectively.

=== Days 49-70 ===
Ashleigh won the "Pick Your Poison" endurance Head of Household competition on Day 50. It was revealed that Canada has chosen Brittnee and Sarah to be the Have-Nots for the week; unbeknownst to the HouseGuests, the pair earned the chance to compete for a secret power. That night, Ashleigh nominated Godfrey and Sarah for eviction, hoping to evict social threat Sarah. Brittnee and Bruno were on the shortlist. On Day 51, Sarah won the "Pin It to Win It" Power of Veto competition, as well as 250,000 Windom points. Everyone but Pilar participated. Brittnee and Sarah learned of this week's Have-Not twist the next day and competed for the secret power; Brittnee was the winner. Sarah removed herself from the block on Day 53, with Brittnee being named the replacement nominee. Brittnee chose to use her secret power moments before the live eviction on Day 56, allowing her to remove herself and Godfrey from the block and choose the two replacement nominees. She chose to nominate Bruno and Zach. Bruno was evicted from the House in a unanimous vote.

Sarah won the "100 Minutes in Hell" Head of Household competition that night. Brittnee and Zach became the Have-Nots for the week for coming in last place. On Day 57, Ashleigh and Godfrey won a task and each earned $500 gift cards to Pizza Pizza. Ashleigh and Zach were nominated the next day, with Godfrey and Pilar on the shortlist. Ashleigh won the "Shomi the Veto" competition on Day 59. Godfrey passed a secret task that night, and won a reward for the House. Ashleigh used the Power of Veto to save herself on Day 60, with Pilar being the replacement nominee. Zach was evicted in a unanimous vote on Day 63. HouseGuests learned that it would be a double eviction night prior to the "Web of Flies" Head of Household competition, which Brittnee won. She nominated Asleigh and Pilar for eviction, with Ashleigh winning the "Pit Stop to Veto" competition soon after. Ashleigh removed herself from the block with Godfrey going up in her place; Pilar was then evicted. Sarah won "The Voice of Housebots Past" Head of Household competition later that night, ensuring herself a spot in the show's finale.

On Day 64, former HouseGuests Gary Levy and Ika Wong entered the House to style the contestants for the annual awards show. Ashleigh and Godfrey were nominated that same day, with Brittnee being on the shortlist. Ashleigh won the "Fast Track to Finale" competition on Day 65. During a surprise eviction on Day 66, Ashleigh removed herself from the block; Brittnee was nominated in her place, being the only HouseGuest eligible. Ashleigh then cast the sole vote to evict Brittnee from the House. Following Brittnee's eviction, the final three HouseGuests learned they must agree on one member of the jury to ban from voting; they chose Jordan. Godfrey won "The End of Time" competition, the first part of the final Head of Household. Ashleigh won the "Final Front-Gear" competition on Day 68, meaning her and Godfrey would face off on the show's finale. On Day 70, Godfrey became the final Head of Household of the season after winning the "Jury Questions" competition; he chose to evict Ashleigh, making Godfrey and Sarah the final two. Sarah was crowned the winner of season three that night, receiving seven of nine jury votes.

== Voting history ==
Color key:

Winner
Runner-up
Head of Household
Nominated for eviction
Immune from eviction
Votes to Save
Evicted
Re-entered the game

	Week 1	Week 2	Week 3		Week 4	Week 5	Week 6	Week 7		Week 8		Week 9		Week 10		
	Week 1	Week 2	Day 15 (Note: This week was an instant eviction week. Immediately after nominations, the HouseGuests were instructed to cast their votes to evict.)	Day 16	Week 4	Week 5	Week 6	Day 43	Day 49 (Note: This week was a triple eviction week. Following the regular eviction, the remaining HouseGuests played a modified week's worth of games, including HoH and Veto competitions and their respective ceremonies during the remainder of the live show. The Head of Household was obliged to nominate three HouseGuests for eviction. Additionally, the voting HouseGuests would vote to save rather than to evict, with the HouseGuest with the most votes to save being the sole nominee surviving the vote for that cycle.)	Day 50	Day 56	Day 57	Day 63 (Note: This week was a double eviction week. Following the first eviction, the remaining HouseGuests played a week's worth of games, including Head of Household and veto competitions, and nomination, veto and eviction ceremonies, during the live show, culminating in a second eviction for the week.)	Day 64	Day 70	Finale
Head of Household	All HouseGuests (Note: Shortly after the HouseGuests entered the House, they were informed that they were all named Head of Household and would be forced to nominate in a House Vote.)	Bobby	Kevin	Brittnee	Bruno	Zach	Pilar	Kevin	Brittnee	Ashleigh		Sarah	Brittnee	Sarah	Godfrey	(None)
Nominations (pre-veto)	Risha; Sindy	Brittnee; Kevin	Brittnee; Naeha	Bobby; Kevin	Johnny; Sarah	Godfrey; Jordan	Godfrey; Sindy	Bobby; Brittnee	Kevin; Pilar; Zach	Godfrey; Sarah	Brittnee; Godfrey	Ashleigh; Zach	Ashleigh; Pilar	Ashleigh; Godfrey	Ashleigh; Sarah	(None)
Veto Winner	Sindy	Kevin	(None)	Johnny	Bruno	Zach	Godfrey	Kevin	Bruno	Sarah	Brittnee (Note: Brittnee won the special Have-Not Super Power competition. Brittnee's power forced her to save one nominee from the block and name the replacement nominee during the live eviction. She was also allowed to save and replace the other nominee if she so chose. Just before the live vote, Brittnee used her power to save herself and Godfrey. She nominated Bruno and Zach in their places.)	Ashleigh	Ashleigh	Ashleigh	(None)	(None)
Nominations (post-veto)	Pilar (Note: Sindy won the Power of Veto competition and was given the power to remove herself from the block and name her own replacement nominee. She named Pilar as her replacement.); Risha	Brittnee; Sindy	(None)	Bobby; Graig	Johnny; Sarah	Godfrey; Jordan	Brittnee; Sindy	Bobby; Brittnee	Kevin; Pilar; Willow	Brittnee; Godfrey	Bruno; Zach	Pilar; Zach	Godfrey; Pilar	Brittnee; Godfrey	(None)	(None)
Sarah	Kevin, Zach	Sindy	Brittnee	Graig	Nominated	Jordan	Sindy	Bobby	Pilar	Nominations void	Bruno	Head of Household	Pilar	Head of Household	Nominated	Winner (Day 70)
Godfrey	Bobby, Pilar	Sindy	Naeha	Graig	Johnny	Nominated	Sindy	Bobby	Pilar	Nominated	Bruno	Zach	Nominated	Nominated	Ashleigh (Note: As Head of Household, Godfrey chose to evict Ashleigh.)	Runner-up (Day 70)
Ashleigh	Risha, Bruno	Sindy	Naeha	Graig	Johnny	Godfrey	Sindy	Bobby	Pilar	Head of Household		Zach	Godfrey	Brittnee	Evicted (Day 70)	Sarah
Brittnee	Risha, Sindy	Nominated	Nominated	Head of Household	Johnny	Jordan	Nominated	Nominated	Head of Household	Nominated	Bruno	Zach	Pilar (Note: As the vote was tied, the Head of Household cast the tie-breaker vote.)	Nominated	Evicted (Day 66)	Sarah
Pilar	Zach, Bruno	Sindy	Naeha	Graig	Johnny	Godfrey	Head of Household	Bobby	Nominated	Nominations void	Bruno	Nominated	Nominated	Evicted (Day 63)		Sarah
Zach	Godfrey, Sindy	Sindy	Naeha	Graig	Johnny	Head of Household	Sindy	Bobby	Willow	Nominations void	Nominated	Nominated	Evicted (Day 63)			Sarah
Bruno	Bobby, Pilar	Sindy	Naeha	Graig	Head of Household	Jordan	Sindy	Bobby	Willow	Nominations void	Nominated	Evicted (Day 56)				Godfrey
Willow	Sarah, Sindy	Sindy	Naeha	Graig	Johnny	Godfrey	Sindy	Bobby	Nominated	Evicted (Day 49)						Sarah
Kevin	Bruno, Risha	Sindy	Head of Household	Graig	Johnny	Godfrey	Sindy	Head of Household	Nominated	Evicted (Day 49)						Sarah
Bobby	Bruno, Sarah	Head of Household	Naeha	Nominated	Johnny	Jordan	Sindy	Nominated	Evicted (Day 49)							Godfrey
Sindy	Risha, Pilar	Nominated	Evicted (Day 14)			Jordan (Note: As a returning HouseGuest, Sindy was given a task to earn immunity from being nominated at the Veto Cermoney. She completed the task and was given immunity for the week.)	Nominated	Re-evicted (Day 42)								Sarah
Jordan	Sindy, Risha	Sindy	Naeha	Graig	Johnny	Nominated	Evicted (Day 35)									~~Sarah~~ (Note: The final three HouseGuests had to pick one of the first nine jurors to be evicted from the jury; they chose Jordan.)
Johnny	Naeha, Sindy	Sindy	Brittnee	Graig	Nominated	Evicted (Day 28)										
Graig	Sindy, Pilar	Sindy	Naeha	Nominated	Evicted (Day 21)											
Naeha	Sindy, Godfrey	Sindy	Nominated	Evicted (Day 15)												
Risha	Ashleigh, Sindy	Evicted (Day 7)														
Evicted	Risha; Canada's choice to evict	Sindy; 12 of 12 votes to evict	Naeha; 9 of 11 votes to evict	Graig; 10 of 10 votes to evict	Johnny; 9 of 9 votes to evict	Sindy; Won re-entry into game (Note: The first five evicted HouseGuests competed in an Endurance competition to return to the House. Sindy won the competition and re-entered the house.)	Sindy; 8 of 8 votes to evict	Bobby; 7 of 7 votes to evict	Kevin; 0 of 5 votes to save	(None)	Bruno; 4 of 4 votes to evict	Zach; 3 of 3 votes to evict	Pilar; 2 of 3 votes to evict	Brittnee; Ashleigh's choice to evict	Ashleigh; Godfrey's choice to evict	Sarah; 7 votes to win
Evicted	Risha; Canada's choice to evict	Sindy; 12 of 12 votes to evict	Naeha; 9 of 11 votes to evict	Graig; 10 of 10 votes to evict	Johnny; 9 of 9 votes to evict	Jordan; 5 of 9 votes to evict	Sindy; 8 of 8 votes to evict	Bobby; 7 of 7 votes to evict	Willow; 2 of 5 votes to save	(None)	Bruno; 4 of 4 votes to evict	Zach; 3 of 3 votes to evict	Pilar; 2 of 3 votes to evict	Brittnee; Ashleigh's choice to evict	Ashleigh; Godfrey's choice to evict	Godfrey; 2 votes to win

== Have-Nots ==
	Week 1	Week 2	Week 3 (Note: Zach used a slop pass he won in Week 3's Head of Household competition. This, however, did not exempt him from sleeping in the Have-Not room nor from taking cold showers.)	Week 4	Week 5	Week 6	Week 7 (Note: Willow used a slop pass she won in Week 6's Power of Veto competition. This, however, did not exempt her from sleeping in the Have-Not room nor from taking cold showers.)	Week 8 (Note: The Have-Nots this week were chosen by Canada. Unbeknownst to them, Brittnee and Sarah were Have-Nots in order to give them the opportunity to earn the Have-Not Super Power.)	Week 9	Week 10
Have-Nots	none	Brittnee, Godfrey, Jordan, Naeha	Ashleigh, Bobby, Kevin, Zach	Brittnee, Pilar, Willow	Bruno, Godfrey, Jordan, Sarah	Brittnee, Godfrey, Kevin, Sarah	Bobby, Willow, Zach	Brittnee, Sarah	Brittnee, Zach	none

== Nomination shortlist ==
The shortlist was introduced this season, replacing the key ceremony previously used as the Nomination Ceremony. Each HoH was required to name a nomination shortlist of the four HouseGuests they were considering nominating before making their two official nominations. The shortlist was not made public to the other HouseGuests, and did not impact gameplay.

	Week 1 (Note: Due to a nomination vote, week 1 had no shortlist.)	Week 2	Week 3 (Note: Due to an instant eviction, the first eviction of week 3 had no shortlist.)		Week 4	Week 5	Week 6	Week 7 (Note: Due to a triple eviction, the second & third eviction of week 7 had no shortlist.)		Week 8	Week 9 (Note: Due to a double eviction, the second eviction of week 9 eviction had no shortlist.)		Week 10 (Note: No nomination ceremony was held for the final evicion, as the nominees were the losers of the Final HoH competition.)	
HOH	All; HouseGuests	Bobby	Kevin	Brittnee	Bruno	Zach	Pilar	Kevin	Brittnee	Ashleigh	Sarah	Brittnee	Sarah	Godfrey
Shortlist	none	Brittnee, Johnny, Kevin, Sindy	none	Bobby, Godfrey, Graig, Kevin	Kevin, Johnny, Sarah, Zach	Bobby, Bruno, Godfrey, Jordan	Bobby, Godfrey, Sindy, Willow	Bobby, Brittnee, Bruno, Godfrey	none	Brittnee, Bruno, Godfrey, Sarah	Ashleigh, Godfrey, Pilar, Zach	none	Ashleigh, Brittnee, Godfrey	none

== Production ==
Following a successful first two seasons, it was confirmed on 4 June 2014 that the show would return for a third season. Arisa Cox confirmed her return as host, as well as announced the show's move to Global. Though the main series changed networks, the spin-off seasons continued to air on Slice. The move was seen as a positive change for the show, as Global had a wider audience. Casting began on 20 August, with Robyn Kass once more being given the role of selecting the HouseGuests. Seven open casting calls were scheduled throughout the country in October and November, while online applications were accepted until 24 November. Former HouseGuests such as Jon Pardy and Neda Kalantar appeared at the open casting calls to promote the series. The first promo for the season premiered on 17 December. Dan Gheesling, who had previously won the United States edition in 2008, appeared with Cox on The Morning Show to promote the premiere. The sixteen HouseGuests were revealed prior to the show's launch in a three-night event on ET Canada; six were shown the first night, following by an additional five each of the two following nights. The increase in contestants made season three the season with the most HouseGuests at the time, though all subsequent seasons have featured sixteen.

This season used the same house as the prior season, though featured a dramatic makeover. The new House was revealed through Global on 20 March 2015. Peter Faragher once more designed the House, which heavily displayed a steampunk vibe. Large gears and metals can be seen in all the rooms, giving the appearance of showing the House's inner workings. The British edition of the franchise was cited as an influence on the theme, with Faragher wanting the House to make its inhabitants feel uncomfortable. The layout of the House remains the same as the prior season, with the entrance, bathroom, and main bedrooms upstairs; the Have-Not room remains downstairs. The Head of Household room was compared to the parlor of the Nautilus from Jules Verne's 1870 science-fiction novel Twenty Thousand Leagues Under the Seas. The main bedroom has the appearance of a blue sky with clouds, intended to make HouseGuests feel safe in the room. The Have-Not room hid a special power in the floor. The kitchen table was designed to look like a large bicycle chain with cogs and a sprocket running underneath it.

Twistos returned as a sponsor for the second season in a row, offering a $10,000 trip of their choice to the show's winner. KFC, OxiClean, Shomi, Ramada, and Pizza Pizza also sponsored the series for its third run, with Ramada and Pizza Pizza being returning sponsors. Shomi, owned by Shaw Media, allowed the Head of Household each week to watch one film or television episode. The Brick once more furnished the House, and offered a $25,000 gift card to the winner of the season. Like the previous season, fans were able to select one piece of furniture from The Brick each week to place in the Head of Household suite. Per usual, the winner received an additional $100,000 prize; the runner-up received a $20,000 prize. With the move to a new network, the series had a new broadcast schedule this season. The live eviction episodes aired on Wednesdays at 8 PM Central Time, with the Big Brother After Show airing immediately after on the Slice network. The Sunday episode featured the nomination ceremony, and aired at 6 PM. The final weekly episode aired on Mondays at 7 PM, and featured the weekly Power of Veto competition and the subsequent ceremony. Following their original broadcast, episodes of the season were uploaded onto the official Global website for free streaming.

== Ratings ==
#	Air Date	Canada		Source
#	Air Date	Viewers (millions)	Rank (week)	Source
1	Monday, March 23, 2015	>1.136	>30	
2	Wednesday, March 25, 2015	1.123	20	
3	Sunday, March 29, 2015	1.198	26	
4	Monday, March 30, 2015	1.160	28	
5	Wednesday, April 1, 2015	1.234	25	
6	Sunday, April 5, 2015	1.127	29	
7	Monday, April 6, 2015	1.167	30	
8	Wednesday, April 8, 2015	1.223	27	
9	Sunday, April 12, 2015	1.258	25	
10	Monday, April 13, 2015	1.210	25	
11	Wednesday, April 15, 2015	1.114	27	
12	Sunday, April 19, 2015	>1.093	>30	
