= Big Brother Canada season 4 =

Big Brother Canada
- Season 4
- Big Brother Canada 4 title card
- Presented by: Arisa Cox
- No. of days: 77
- No. of houseguests: 17
- Winners: Nick & Phil Paquette
- Runner-up: Kelsey Faith
- Companion shows: Big Brother Canada: After Dark; Big Brother: Side Show
- No. of episodes: 32

Release
- Original network: Global
- Original release: March 2 – May 12, 2016

Season chronology
- ← Previous; Season 3 Next → Season 5

Big Brother Canada 4 is the fourth season of the Canadian reality television series Big Brother Canada. It was produced by Endemol Shine North America and Insight Productions for all episodes, and Shaw Media for 16 episodes prior to defunct. The season premiered on March 2, 2016 on Global, and ended after 77 days – the longest season to date – on May 12, 2016, where for the first time in Big Brother Canada history a set of siblings won the series after Nick & Philippe Paquette beat Kelsey Faith in a 7–2 jury vote to be crowned the winners of Big Brother Canada 4.

== HouseGuests ==
The cast of the fourth season of Big Brother Canada. From left to right: Nikki, Jason, Dallas, Christine, Kelsey, Mitch, Cassandra, Sharry, Phil, Joel, Loveita, Raul, Maddy, Ramsey, Jared, Paige, Tim and Veronica

| Name | Age | Occupation | Residence | Entry | Result |
|---|---|---|---|---|---|
| Nick Paquette (Note: Phil Paquette was originally announced as an individual HouseGuest. During the premiere, Nick Paquette was introduced, and revealed to be playing with his brother. The brothers would live in the house together but play as a single HouseGuest, with one vote between them and alternating in playing competitions every week.) | 20 | Student | Ottawa, Ontario | 1 | Winners; Day 77 |
| Phil Paquette | 21 | DJ | Ottawa, Ontario | 1 | Winners; Day 77 |
| Kelsey Faith | 25 | Flight attendant & Bartender | Calgary, Alberta | 28 | Runner-up; Day 77 |
| Kelsey Faith | 25 | Flight attendant & Bartender | Calgary, Alberta | 1 | Fake Evicted; Day 28 |
| Tim Dormer Big Brother Australia 2013 | 31 | TV & Radio personality | Sydney, New South Wales | 7 | Evicted; Day 77 |
| Cassandra Shahinfar | 22 | Social media strategist | Winnipeg, Manitoba | 1 | Evicted; Day 72 |
| Joel Lefevre | 33 | Actor | Edmonton, Alberta | 1 | Evicted; Day 70 |
| Nikki Grahame Big Brother UK 7 & Ultimate Big Brother | 33 | TV personality | London, U.K. | 7 | Evicted; Day 63 |
| Jared Kesler | 24 | Pipeline worker | Winnipeg, Manitoba | 1 | Evicted; Day 63 |
| Madelyn "Maddy" Pavle | 21 | Server | Vancouver, British Columbia | 1 | Evicted; Day 56 |
| Ramsey Aburaneh | 26 | Digital marketing | Toronto, Ontario | 1 | Walked; Day 52 |
| Raul Manriquez | 21 | Fashion stylist | Calgary, Alberta | 1 | Evicted; Day 49 |
| Mitch Moffit | 27 | YouTuber | Guelph, Ontario | 1 | Evicted; Day 42 |
| Dallas Cormier | 24 | Welder | Saint John, New Brunswick | 1 | Evicted; Day 35 |
| Loveita Adams | 25 | Entrepreneur | Fort McMurray, Alberta | 28 | Evicted; Day 35 |
| Loveita Adams | 25 | Entrepreneur | Fort McMurray, Alberta | 1 | Fake Evicted; Day 28 |
| Christine Kelsey | 47 | Housekeeper | Vancouver, British Columbia | 1 | Evicted; Day 21 |
| Sharry Ash | 30 | Customer service supervisor | Toronto, Ontario | 1 | Evicted; Day 14 |
| Paige Distranski | 19 | Veterinarian tech assistant | Thunder Bay, Ontario | 1 | Evicted; Day 7 |

=== International HouseGuests ===
On February 23, four former contestants (two men and two women) from international editions of Big Brother, were revealed to be competing in a public poll for two spots in the Big Brother Canada, with the man and woman with the highest number of votes entering the Big Brother Canada house immediately after the first eviction. On Day 7, Nikki Grahame and Tim Dormer entered the Big Brother Canada house and were immune for their first week.

Non-selected international candidates

| Name | Age | Occupation | Residence | Big Brother history | | |
| Name | Age | Occupation | Residence | Series | Season(s) | Status |
|---|---|---|---|---|---|---|
| Jase Wirey | 39 | Sales & Safety trainer | Decatur, Illinois | Big Brother U.S. | Big Brother 5 | Evicted; 10th place |
| Jase Wirey | 39 | Sales & Safety trainer | Decatur, Illinois | Big Brother U.S. | Big Brother: All-Stars | Evicted; 12th place |
| Veronica Graf | 26 | TV personality & Model | Faenza, Emilia-Romagna | Grande Fratello | Grande Fratello 13 | Evicted; 16th place |

=== Future appearances ===
In 2017, HouseGuests Cassandra Shahinfar and Dallas Cormier returned to compete on Big Brother Canada 5. Nikki Grahame also returned on Big Brother Canada 5 to give the remaining houseguests makeovers for the Big Brother Canada awards. Tim Dormer also returned to lead the Jury roundtable segment during the final week.

In 2022, Dormer returned to compete on Big Brother Australia 14.

== Summary ==
On Day 1, fourteen HouseGuests entered the BBCAN Grand Hotel. They were then dealt their first twist. Two HouseGuests, Nick and Phil, were revealed to be brothers. The brothers will act as one HouseGuest, alternating who will participate in competitions each week. The brothers selected Nick to compete this week. They will be nominated and evicted together, and they will only have one eviction vote between them. If they make it to the end, they will split the prize money. Shortly before the Head of Household competition, the HouseGuests were asked to bet who they thought will be the first HouseGuest eliminated and the Head of Household. The HouseGuests selected Joel and Nick, respectively. If Joel defies expectations and is not the first one eliminated, he will win immunity for the week. If Nick does not live up to expectations and does not win Head of Household, he (and his brother Phil) will be locked away in isolation for the night. The HouseGuests then took part in the first Head of Household competition, One Night Stand. HouseGuests stood on a narrow beam while holding onto a rope. As the competition continues, the rope would wind towards the center, dragging the HouseGuests with it. HouseGuests must remain on the beam and keep the rope in their hands. The last HouseGuest standing on their beam with their rope in their hands will be the first Head of Household. Joel earned safety, Nick & Phil were both locked away in the High Roller room for the night. Loveita won the competition and became the first Head of Household of the season. A showmance started to blossom between Kelsey and Jared. Loveita hoped to split them up as they could be dangerous down the road. At the nomination ceremony, Loveita nominated Kelsey and Paige, with Kelsey as her target. Loveita, Kelsey, and Paige, as well as Sharry, Nick & Phil, and Raul, with Dallas as the host, competed in the What the Shell? Power of Veto competition. While dressed as mermaids, HouseGuests had to slide down their bumpy lane, grab a letter, and take it back to their puzzle board. Once they had all the letters, they had to solve a mystery phrase. The first HouseGuest to solve their puzzle will win the Power of Veto. Nick & Phil won the Power of Veto. At the Veto Meeting, the brothers decided to keep Loveita's nominations intact. Though the brothers kept the nominees the same for Loveita they rather keep Kelsey in the house over Paige for the fact if Kelsey and Jared are a showmance people would go after them. Along with their influence and Kelsey's campaign of flirting on Day 7, Paige was evicted by a vote of 7–4, receiving the votes of Dallas, Maddy, Ramsey, and Sharry. Shortly after Paige's eviction, Tim and Nikki were revealed to be the two wildcards and became HouseGuests. They received immunity for the upcoming week.

Following Tim and Nikki's entrance, the HouseGuests gathered around to meet them, most not happy while some hoping to take advantage of their arrival. Tim had fit right in understanding how to play the game but deciding to play dumb while Nikki had a panic attack as the realization of being in the house hits her. Later in the night everyone except for Loveita, Nikki, and Tim, went head-to-head in the Big Brother Roast Head of Household competition. Canada was asked to give their first impressions of the HouseGuests. Arisa read an impression of a HouseGuest. HouseGuests were required to buzz in and state to which HouseGuest the impression was referring. A correct answer allowed the HouseGuest to eliminate anyone he or she wanted from the competition. An incorrect answer resulted in their own elimination. The last HouseGuest standing will be the new Head of Household. Jared was the winner. Loveita was scared Jared would nominate her for the fact that Kelsey stayed over Paige and Jared and Kelsey are close. On Day 8, the HouseGuests took part in the Wheel of Meals Have-Not competition. Each team was required to strap one member to a spinning wheel with food targets. They had one minute to spin their teammate for as many revolutions as possible. For each revolution, they got one paint balloon to throw at the food targets. The targets hit will represent what food they will eat for the week. The team that hits the fewest targets will be the Have-Nots for the week. Cassandra, Joel, Loveita, and Sharry were the Have-Nots for the week. Sharry went to campaign to Jared in hopes of saving Loveita from nomination but was told she may be a nominee due to association with her. On Day 8, Jared nominated Loveita and Sharry for eviction. On Day 9, Jared, Loveita, Sharry, Nick & Phil, Mitch, and Christine played in the Flip It to Win Power of Veto competition, sponsored by the Brick. HouseGuests were required to search furniture for keys to open three doors. The three HouseGuests who opened the doors moved on to the final round. Throughout the furniture were pictures from past competitions. HouseGuests were asked a question about a past competition. If they did not know the answer, there were clues in the furniture room to assist them. The first HouseGuest to answer five questions correctly will win the Power of Veto and $5,000 gift card from the Brick. Christine, Mitch, and Loveita moved on to the final round, and Christine won the Power of Veto and the $5,000 gift card from the Brick. After her Veto win, Christine was given a chance to double her gift card money by selecting the correct couch cushion. She did, and received another $5000 for a grand total of $10,000. On Day 11, Christine decided to leave Jared's nominations intact. On Day 12, Big Brother gave Cassandra and Joel the task to clean all of the dirty laundry and sheets in the House. They were secretly given the task to pick two clothing items from each HouseGuest to give to charity. However, the other HouseGuests were told about this secret task and were given a mission of their own to act incredibly upset that they lost their clothes. The HouseGuests passed their task and earned a party. The remainder of the week was talk on who stays, Loveita or Sharry. Most people looked at Loveita staying in the game beneficial to them as she would still be a target as for Sharry wouldn't be as much of one. On Day 14, Sharry was evicted by an 11–1 vote, with Nikki voting to evict Loveita.

Following Sharry's eviction, the HouseGuests battled in the Big Brother Breakaway Head of Household competition. One at a time, HouseGuests slid a ball down the lane attempting to get the highest point value. The HouseGuest with the highest point value will be the new Head of Household. Loveita was the winner. Most people in the house believed Loveita had an easy decision in nominating one of the Third Wheel alliance (composed of Jared, Kelsey and Raul). Even though it seemed the easy thing to do Loveita was getting tired of the back and forth targeting they've been doing. Joel was given a secret mission by Marsha the Moose to ask Cassandra on a date and if Loveita would let him use the Head of Household room for the date. However, during the date, Joel had to dump Cassandra. He passed his mission and earned a party for the House. Cassandra and Joel were caught for breaking Have-Not rules and were made Have-Nots again for the week. Loveita struck a deal with Jared, Kelsey, and Raul and wanted to go after Cassandra due to a rude comment made by her after the Head of Household competition. On Day 15, Loveita nominated Cassandra and Christine, with Cassandra as her target. On Day 16, Loveita, Cassandra, and Christine drew Dallas, Jared, and Ramsey to join them in the Allegiant Veto Power of Veto competition, sponsored by the new movie, Allegiant. For this competition, HouseGuests had to rappel down a huge wall and search airplane wreckage to find puzzle pieces. The first HouseGuest to finish their puzzle, climb the wall, and hit the buzzer will win the Power of Veto, as well as a special screening of Allegiant. Dallas was the winner and selected Maddy, Loveita, and Joel to join him to watch the movie. Although he tried to convince Loveita to target the brothers, on Day 18, Dallas decided not to use the Power of Veto. On Day 21, Christine was evicted by a 6–5 vote, with Dallas, Maddy, Nikki, Ramsey, and Tim voting to evict Cassandra.

Following Christine's eviction, the HouseGuests paired up for the Locked Lips Head of Household competition. HouseGuests must work together to transport fifty balls from the diner to the well at Makeout Point without their hands. The first pair to transport all 50 balls will win the competition and must decide between the two of them who will be the Head of Household. Mitch and Joel narrowly defeated Dallas and Jared, and Joel became the new Head of Household. HouseGuests later stepped up to the plate for the Big Brother Baseball Have-Not competition. For this competition, each person had three chances to hit an oversized ball over the wall. The other team attempted to catch the ball on the other side of the wall while wearing oversized mitts. A caught ball counted as an out and a fair ball was a home run. The team with the most runs will be the Haves for the week and must select four HouseGuests from the losing team to be Have-Nots. Jared, Kelsey, Raul, and Tim were the Have-Nots for the week. On Day 22, Joel nominated Kelsey and Raul. On Day 23, Joel, Kelsey, and Raul, alongside Dallas, Ramsey, and Jared, saddled up for the Ace in the Hole Power of Veto competition. For this competition, HouseGuests had to pull themselves on a horse with a rope along a rail, dig up bags containing playing cards, and take it back to their board. Each HouseGuest may only hold five cards. Some cards may have a reward or a punishment attached to it, which the must accept if they play it. The HouseGuest with the best poker hand will win the Power of Veto. Kelsey won $1000, Raul had to lasso a bull 1000 times before sundown, Dallas must wear a cactus costume for 24 hours, but he also won the Power of Veto. On Day 25, Dallas decided not to use the Power of Veto. On Day 28, Arisa informed the HouseGuests of a Double Eviction night, and Kelsey was evicted by an 8–2 vote, with Cassandra and Jared voting to evict Raul. Immediately after, the HouseGuests were quizzed in the Heads Up Head of Household competition. In this competition, HouseGuests faced off in one-on-one matches. Each question will refer to a past competition. The person to buzz in with the correct answer will eliminate their opponent, and an incorrect answer will eliminate themselves. The person who survives will pick the next two players to face off. The last HouseGuest standing will be the new Head of Household. Maddy was the winner. She immediately nominated Jared and Raul for eviction, with the intention of backdooring Loveita. Maddy, Jared, and Raul picked Tim, Nick & Phil, and Joel to play in the Slow Roller Power of Veto competition. For the competition, HouseGuests had to fill their ladle with punch, roller skate down their lane, and fill their straw. However, their skates were tied together. The first HouseGuest to fill their straw and get the ball will win the Power of Veto. Nick & Phil won the Power of Veto. Nick & Phil decided to take Jared off the block, and Maddy named Loveita as the replacement nominee. On Day 28, Loveita was evicted by a 7–2 vote, with Dallas and Joel voting to evict Raul. However, both Kelsey and Loveita were relocated into a secret room for a week, where one of them will return to the game next week.

Following Kelsey and Loveita's evictions, the HouseGuests hoped to take control in the Blast From the Past Head of Household competition. In this competition, HouseGuests were asked questions based on items contained in a time capsule given to the HouseGuests. The HouseGuest with the most points will be the new Head of Household. Tim was the winner. On Day 29, HouseGuests were given the task to play "Big Brother Says". HouseGuests must perform all tasks Big Brother gives them. The HouseGuests passed their task and earned a pizza party. Tim chose to hold a house meeting and revealed that his nominations would be based on a HouseGuests vote with the voting rules being adopted from his season of Big Brother Australia. Each HG had 5 nomination points (represented by Gummy Koalas from his HoH box) to give to 2 HouseGuests. Most of the HouseGuest voted according to Tim's rules but Dallas chose not to participate, leading to Dallas himself getting 5 Koala as a penalty. On Day 29, Tim nominated Dallas (who has received 30 Koalas) and Ramsey (who received 9 Koalas) for eviction. On Day 30, Tim, Dallas, and Ramsey chose Cassandra, Jared, and Mitch to play in the End of the Rainbow Power of Veto competition. For this competition, HouseGuests had to roll their ball past the obstacles and up and over their rainbow and catch it on the other side. If a HouseGuest drops their ball, their counter will drop to zero. The first HouseGuest to roll their ball 300 times without dropping it will win the Power of Veto. Ramsey won the Power of Veto. On Day 32, Ramsey took himself off the block, and Tim named Maddy as the replacement nominee. On Day 33, Emmett surprised Kelsey and Loveita to give them the secret task to hide black and white poker chips throughout the House. The HouseGuests were then split into team to find their team's poker chips in ten minutes. The team who finds more poker chips will receive a reward, and the losing team will receive a punishment. The white team of Ramsey, Nick & Phil, Joel, Cassandra, and Raul won and received a cocktail party with Emmett and Tim. The black team of Dallas, Jared, Maddy, Mitch, and Nikki lost and were forced to clean the House. Despite Dallas receiving the most votes on the gummy koala poll, Tim changed his target to Maddy, hatching a plan to use his tie breaking vote to backdoor her. On Day 35, however, neither Nikki nor Ramsey sided with Tim, and as a result, Dallas was evicted by a 5–3 vote, with Cassandra, Joel, and Nick & Phil voting to evict Maddy.

Following Dallas's eviction, Arisa informed the HouseGuests that last week was a Fake Double Eviction. She then told the HouseGuests that they must come to a unanimous decision on whether Kelsey or Loveita should return to the House. They unanimously decided to bring Kelsey back into the house. Following Kelsey's return, the HouseGuests participated in the Trading Fates Head of Household competition. In this competition, HouseGuests had to endure one of three punishments: balancing a sword on their head, balancing a ball on a disk, or pushing a boulder. If a HouseGuest drops the sword, drops the ball, or lets go of the boulder, they will be eliminated. However, at certain points in the competition, HouseGuests may trade punishments. The last HouseGuest standing will be the new Head of Household. Raul was the winner. Raul was then required to name four Have-Nots for the week. Joel, Maddy, Nick & Phil, and Ramsey became the Have-Nots for the week. On Day 36, Raul nominated Joel and Mitch for eviction. On Day 37, Raul, Joel, and Mitch, as well as Jared, Nick & Phil, and Ramsey, rivaled in the Who Can You Beat? Power of Veto competition. In this competition, there are three games to play: Blackjack Roulette, BBCAN Bingo, and Card Toss. Each player would compete head-to-head against another HouseGuest in one of the games. The winner will receive 3 points, and the loser will receive one point. However, the non-participating players will bet on which HouseGuest will win the head-to-head match. If a HouseGuest guesses correctly, they will receive 2 points. The HouseGuest with the most points after six rounds will win the Power of Veto. Jared won the Power of Veto. On Day 39, Jared decided to keep Raul's nominations intact. On Day 42, Mitch was evicted by a 5–3 vote, with Maddy, Nikki, and Ramsey voting to evict Joel. He became the first jury member.

Following Mitch's eviction, the HouseGuests recollected for the Before or After Head of Household competition. In this competition, HouseGuests were read an event. They were then read a second event and were required to state whether the first event took place before or after the second event. An incorrect answer will result in elimination. The last HouseGuest standing will be the new Head of Household. Maddy was the winner. On Day 43, the HouseGuests silently competed in the Slop Vote Have-Not competition. One at a time, HouseGuests went to the living room and poured a bucket of slop into the HouseGuests' container they wanted to be a Have-Not. The three HouseGuests with the most slop in their buckets will be the Have-Nots for the week. Kelsey, Nikki, and Raul were the Have-Nots for the week. On Day 43, Maddy nominated Jared and Kelsey for eviction. On Day 44, Maddy, Jared, Kelsey, Nikki, Cassandra, and Raul scrapped in the Six Blind Mice Power of Veto competition. In this competition, HouseGuests had to crawl through a maze blindfolded while trying to reach each of the corners of the maze. In each corner, they need to dig up a circle, triangle, square, and star emblem out of a sand pit. The first HouseGuest to find all four emblems and hit the button in the center of the maze will win the Power of Veto. Jared won the Power of Veto. On Day 45, the HouseGuests were given the task to clean the House within 20 minutes. The HouseGuests passed their task and earned a pizza party. On Day 46, Jared took himself off the block, and Maddy named Raul as the replacement nominee. On Day 47, the HouseGuests were tasked with creating the best meme. Tim made the best meme and received a $1000 gift card from the Brick. On Day 49, Raul was evicted by a 6–1 vote, with Tim voting to evict Kelsey.

Following Raul's eviction, HouseGuests learned about the next wild card. Canada voted for two HouseGuests to participate in a game of chance to become the new Head of Household. Canada selected Nikki and Nick & Phil. The HouseGuests then went to the High Roller room for the Big Brother Roulette Head of Household competition. Each HouseGuest, except Nikki, Nick & Phil, and Maddy, rolled one ball into a roulette wheel with the faces of Nikki and Nick & Phil. If a ball lands in a HouseGuest's section, they will receive one point. The first HouseGuest to four points will be the new Head of Household. In the event of a tie, Maddy, as the outgoing Head of Household, will roll a ball to break it. Nick & Phil became the new Head of Household. On Day 50, the HouseGuests were given a task to have Nikki and Tim pick teams to teach them for a Canadian quiz. If Nikki and Tim can answer seven of the ten questions correctly, they will receive a prize. The HouseGuests passed their task and received poutine and beer. The HouseGuests later lit up for the Stay in Charge Have-Not competition. In this competition, all HouseGuests will stand on a charged hover board. Each time the hover board hits the ground, it will lose power. HouseGuests may attempt to toss balls into their baskets to recharge their hover board. Once a HouseGuest loses all of their power, they are out of the game. The team who lasts longer will be Haves for the week, and the HouseGuest who performs the best in the competition will win a Never-Not pass. Jared won the Never-Not pass, and the team of Ramsey, Nikki, Maddy, and Jared won the competition. As the winners, they had to select one HouseGuest from the losing team to be a Have for the week. They selected Joel, and Cassandra, Kelsey, and Tim became the Have-Nots for the week. On Day 50, Nick & Phil nominated Maddy and Ramsey for eviction. On Day 51, Nick & Phil, Ramsey, and Maddy, as well as Tim, Kelsey, and Nikki, fought in the Spun Out Power of Veto competition. One at a time, HouseGuests had to study before and after photos. In each set of photo, one HouseGuest changed clothes. They had to identify the different clothing item in the after photo, search for the item throughout the clotheslines, and toss the item into their laundry basket. If they miss, they must sit in the spin cycle for 45 seconds before they could try again. The HouseGuest who completes all seven rounds the fastest will win $5000 from Oxi-Clean and the Power of Veto. Ramsey won the Power of Veto and the $5000. On Day 52, Ramsey decided to walk from the game due to a family emergency. On Day 53, due to Ramsey being a nominee and holding the Power of Veto at the time of his departure, it was treated as though he took himself off the block. Nick & Phil then named Tim as the replacement nominee. On Day 54, Nick & Phil were given a secret task to fake a fight. They passed their task and the House received a training session with Elias Theodorou. On Day 56, Maddy was evicted by a 5–0 vote. The HouseGuests were then told their loved ones were there and the loved ones would play to determine the next Head of Household.

Following Maddy's eviction, the HouseGuests' loved ones represented in the Rock and a Hard Place Head of Household competition. In this competition, the loved ones watched rocks fall into a crater. Once they believed 1000 rocks fell into the crater, they hit their buzzer. The loved one who hits their buzzer the closest to 1000 rocks will win Head of Household for their loved one. Cassandra's father won the competition, and Cassandra became the new Head of Household. On Day 57, the HouseGuests were given the task to marry Nikki and Joel in the Have-Not room. If they pass their task, there will be no more Have-Nots for the season. They passed their task and Have-Nots were disbanded. On Day 57, Cassandra nominated Nick & Phil and Nikki for eviction, with Nick & Phil as the target. On Day 58, everyone except for Tim calculated in The Price of POV Power of Veto competition, hosted by Season 3 winner, Sarah Hanlon. in this competition, HouseGuests were secluded in a booth and were given an equivalent to 100 poker chips- black chip representing one and red chips representing five. Sarah will make them a series of nine offers. HouseGuests must then place a bet with their chips of how willing they are to accept it in exchange for points. HouseGuests must keep the offers they buy, regardless whether they win or lose the competition. The HouseGuest with the most points will win the Power of Veto. Cassandra agreed to clean up poker chips and took a strategy session with Sarah. Jared agreed to take an eel bath for the duration of the competition. Nick & Phil agreed to wear a skunk suit, sit out of the next POV, and receive a haircut from Sarah. Joel agreed to eat slop for the rest of the season, not shower for a week, and give up all but a bag of his personal belongings. Nick & Phil won the Power of Veto. On Day 60, Nick & Phil took themselves off the block, and Cassandra named Jared as the replacement nominee. On Day 63, Jared was evicted by a 3–1 vote, with Nick & Phil voting to evict Nikki. Immediately after Jared's eviction, the HouseGuests were informed of the double eviction. They then went to the backyard for the Bowled Over Head of Household competition. In this competition, each HouseGuest had their own lane with five bowling pins at the end. The first HouseGuest to knock down all five of their pins will be the new Head of Household. Nick & Phil were the winners. Nick & Phil then nominated Nikki and Tim for eviction. The HouseGuests, except for Nick & Phil, then quoted in the Name That Speech Power of Veto competition. Arisa would read a quote from one of five evicted HouseGuests. The HouseGuests must then turn their cube to who said each quote. An incorrect answer resulted in elimination. The last person standing will win the Power of Veto. Cassandra won the Power of Veto. At the Veto Meeting, Cassandra took Tim off the block, and Nick & Phil named Joel as the replacement nominee. On Day 63, Nikki was evicted on her birthday by a 3–0 vote.

Following Jared and Nikki's eviction, the HouseGuests sought a spot in the final four in the Previously on Big Brother Canada Head of Household competition. HouseGuests listened to a series of recaps leading to a specific week in the House. HouseGuests then had to spin their dial to who was Head of Household that week. The HouseGuest with the most points will be the new Head of Household. Kelsey was the winner. On Day 64, Kelsey nominated Cassandra and Tim for eviction. In preparation for the Power of Veto competition, the HouseGuests received a special screening of "Unreal". On Day 65, the HouseGuests popped in the Poppin' POV Power of Veto competition, sponsored by Shomi. The competition was played in five rounds. In each round, HouseGuests were shown an order of movie posters. They had to memorize the order, find the posters in the huge tub of popcorn, and put the posters in the correct order on their tablet. The last HouseGuest to complete their tablet each round will be eliminated, and they will also have the duty of arranging the posters for the next round. The last HouseGuest standing will win the Power of Veto and a $5000 entertainment package from Shomi. Tim won the Power of Veto and the entertainment package. On Day 67, Tim took himself off the block, and Kelsey named Joel as the replacement nominee. On Day 70, Joel was evicted by a 2–0 vote.

Following Joel's eviction, the HouseGuests headed to the High Roller room for the Earn Your Slot Head of Household competition. A slot machine will show the faces of the HouseGuests who competed in a certain Power of Veto competition. HouseGuests had to buzz in and identify which Power of Veto competition those HouseGuests competed in. The HouseGuest with the most points will be the new Head of Household. Nick & Phil were the winners. On Day 71, Gary surprised the HouseGuests to dress them up for the Big Brother Canada Awards. The final four then got to see memorable moments from the season. On Day 71, Nick & Phil nominated Cassandra and Tim for eviction. On Day 71, the HouseGuests vied in the final Movin' Out Power of Veto competition. One at a time, the HouseGuests had to search a live-size jury house for 18 clues. They then had to take each of the clues and hang the clues on the realtor sign of the juror who applied to the clues. The HouseGuest who correctly places the clues on the realtor signs the fastest will win the final Power of Veto of the season. Nick & Phil won the Power of Veto. On Day 72, Nick & Phil decided not to use the Power of Veto. On Day 72, Kelsey cast the sole vote to evict Cassandra.

Following Cassandra's eviction, Arisa informed the final three that Canada will become a juror to replace Ramsey. Canada also had the opportunity to ask the final three questions to help them make their decision. Afterwards, the HouseGuests engaged in their final battle in the Tip of the Iceberg Part 1 of the Final Head of Household competition. HouseGuests had to jump into a pool to collect puzzle pieces. They must use they puzzle pieces to construct a bridge to reach the tip of their iceberg. They will then race to release a rescue flare frozen in their ice crevice. In order to retrieve it, they must fill their cup with water from the iceberg, and fill up their tube to get the flare. The first HouseGuest to set off their flare will win the first part of the Final Head of Household and move on to Part 3. Nick & Phil were the winners. Kelsey and Tim then faced off in Part 2 of the Final Head of Household competition, Holy Craps. HouseGuests competed one at a time. HouseGuests had to remove a poker chip from the stack to reveal a clue. They must then use three dice to solve the clues. After each clue, another die will be added. The HouseGuest who solves all of the clues faster will win the second part of the Final Head of Household and face Nick & Phil in Part 3. Kelsey was the winner as Tim forfeited to Kelsey and did not finish the competition. Nick & Phil and Kelsey then faced off in Part 3 of the Final Head of Household competition, Jury Questions. The duo was asked A-or-B questions based on events that applied to members of the Jury. The HouseGuest with the most points after seven questions will be the final Head of Household. Kelsey became the final Head of Household. On Day 77, Kelsey cast the sole vote to evict Tim. On Day 77, after receiving votes from Jared and Raul, Kelsey was deemed the runner-up and walked away with $20,000. Nick & Phil received the votes of Mitch, Canada, Maddy, Nikki, Joel, Cassandra, and Tim, and were deemed the winners of Big Brother Canada 4, winning $50,000 each.

== Voting history ==
Color key:

Winner
Runner-up
Head of Household
Nominated for eviction
Immune from eviction
Evicted
Fake Evicted
Walked
Entered the game

| | Week 1 | Week 2 | Week 3 | Week 4 | | Week 5 | Week 6 | Week 7 | Week 8 | Week 9 | | Week 10 | Week 11 | | |
| | Week 1 | Week 2 | Week 3 | Day 23 | Day 28 (Note: This week was a fake double eviction night. Following Kelsey's eviction, the remaining HouseGuests played a week's worth of game — including HoH and PoV competitions and Nomination, Veto, and Eviction ceremonies — during the remainder of the live show, culminating in two HouseGuests being voted out.) | Week 5 | Week 6 | Week 7 | Week 8 | Day 57 | Day 63 (Note: This week was a double eviction week. Following the first eviction, the remaining HouseGuests played a week's worth of games, including Head of Household and veto competitions, and nomination, veto and eviction ceremonies, during the live show, culminating in a second eviction for the week.) | Week 10 | Day 71 | Day 77 | Finale |
|---|---|---|---|---|---|---|---|---|---|---|---|---|---|---|---|
| Head of Household | Loveita | Jared | Loveita | Joel | Maddy | Tim | Raul | Maddy | **Nick** & Phil (Note: Canada selected two HouseGuests to compete in a game of chance for Head of Household. After Raul's eviction, it was announced that Nick & Phil and Nikki received the most votes to compete. Nick & Phil became the new Head of Household.) | Cassandra (Note: The Head of Household competition was played by friends and family of the HouseGuests. Cassandra's father won the competition, and Cassandra became Head of Household.) | **Nick** & Phil | Kelsey | **Nick** & Phil | Kelsey | (None) |
| Nominations (pre-veto) | Kelsey; Paige | Loveita; Sharry | Cassandra; Christine | Kelsey; Raul | Jared; Raul | Dallas; Ramsey | Joel; Mitch | Jared; Kelsey | Maddy; Ramsey | Nick & Phil; Nikki | Nikki; Tim | Cassandra; Tim | Cassandra; Tim | Nick & Phil; Tim | (None) |
| Veto Winner | **Nick** & Phil | Christine | Dallas | Dallas | **Nick** & Phil | Ramsey | Jared | Jared | Ramsey (Note: As Ramsey won the Power of Veto competition before his departure, the game continued as if Ramsey had used the Power of Veto on himself.) | Nick & **Phil** | Cassandra | Tim | **Nick** & Phil | (None) | (None) |
| Nominations (post-veto) | Kelsey; Paige | Loveita; Sharry | Cassandra; Christine | Kelsey; Raul | Loveita; Raul | Dallas; Maddy | Joel; Mitch | Kelsey; Raul | Maddy; Tim | Jared; Nikki | Joel; Nikki | Cassandra; Joel | Cassandra; Tim | (None) | (None) |
| Nick & Phil (Note: Shortly after entering the House, the HouseGuests learned that brothers Nick & Phil would be competing as one HouseGuest. Each week, the two of them would alternate competing in competitions, starting with Nick. In addition to this, they would have only one vote between the two of them. The brother in bold denotes which one competed in the competitions they won.) | Paige | Sharry | Christine | Kelsey | Loveita | Maddy | Mitch | Raul | Head of Household | Nikki | Head of Household | Joel | Head of Household | Nominated | **Winners** (Day 77) |
| Kelsey | Nominated | Sharry | Christine | Nominated | in Secret; Suite (Note: The fake evicted HouseGuest moved into a Secret Suite, where they were able to watch the remaining HouseGuests secretly, with one of them returning to the House following the next eviction. Following Dallas' eviction, the remaining HouseGuests chose Kelsey to return, officially evicting Loveita.) | | Mitch | Nominated | Maddy | Jared | Nikki | Head of Household | Cassandra | Tim (Note: As Head of Household, Kelsey chose to evict Tim.) | **Runner-up** (Day 77) |
| Tim | Not in House | Sharry (Note: As new HouseGuests, they were immune for the week. They could not compete in the Head of Household or Power of Veto competitions but could vote in the eviction.) | Cassandra | Kelsey | Loveita | Head of Household | Mitch | Kelsey | Nominated | Jared | Nikki | Joel | Nominated | Evicted (Day 77) | Nick & Phil |
| Cassandra | Paige | Sharry | Nominated | Raul | Loveita | Maddy | Mitch | Raul | Maddy | Head of Household | Nikki | Nominated | Nominated | Evicted (Day 72) | Nick & Phil |
| Joel | Paige (Note: The HouseGuests predicted that Joel would be the first player out of Week 1's Head of Household competition; since he was not, he earned immunity for the week.) | Sharry | Christine | Head of Household | Raul | Maddy | Nominated | Raul | Maddy | Jared | Nominated | Nominated | Evicted (Day 70) | | Nick & Phil |
| Nikki | Not in House | Loveita | Cassandra | Kelsey | Loveita | Dallas | Joel | Raul | Maddy | Nominated | Nominated | Evicted (Day 63) | | | Nick & Phil |
| Jared | Paige | Head of Household | Christine | Raul | Loveita | Dallas | Mitch | Raul | Maddy | Nominated | Evicted (Day 63) | | | | Kelsey |
| Maddy | Kelsey | Sharry | Cassandra | Kelsey | Head of Household | Nominated | Joel | Head of Household | Nominated | Evicted (Day 56) | | | | | Nick & Phil |
| Ramsey | Kelsey | Sharry | Cassandra | Kelsey | Loveita | Dallas | Joel | Raul | Walked (Day 52) | | | | | | Nick & Phil (Note: As Ramsey walked during the Jury Phase of the game Canada voted in his place as a Juror. Ramsey cast this vote on behalf of Canada.) |
| Raul | Paige | Sharry | Christine | Nominated | Nominated | Dallas | Head of Household | Nominated | Evicted (Day 49) | | | | | | Kelsey |
| Mitch | Paige | Sharry | Christine | Kelsey | Loveita | Dallas | Nominated | Evicted (Day 42) | | | | | | | Nick & Phil |
| Loveita | Head of Household | Nominated | Head of Household | Kelsey | Nominated | in Secret; Suite | Evicted (Day 35) | | | | | | | | |
| Dallas | Kelsey | Sharry | Cassandra | Kelsey | Raul | Nominated | Evicted (Day 35) | | | | | | | | |
| Christine | Paige | Sharry | Nominated | Evicted (Day 21) | | | | | | | | | | | |
| Sharry | Kelsey | Nominated | Evicted (Day 14) | | | | | | | | | | | | |
| Paige | Nominated | Evicted (Day 7) | | | | | | | | | | | | | |
| Evicted | **Paige**; 7 of 11 votes to evict | **Nikki,** **Tim**; Canada's choice to enter | **Christine**; 6 of 11 votes to evict | **Kelsey**; 8 of 10 votes to fake evict | **Loveita**; 7 of 9 votes to fake evict | **Dallas**; 5 of 8 votes to evict | **Mitch**; 5 of 8 votes to evict | **Raul**; 6 of 7 votes to evict | **Maddy**; 5 of 5 votes to evict | **Jared**; 3 of 4 votes to evict | **Nikki**; 3 of 3 votes to evict | **Joel**; 2 of 2 votes to evict | **Cassandra**; Kelsey's choice to evict | **Tim**; Kelsey's choice to evict | **Nick & Phil**; 7 votes to win |
| Evicted | **Paige**; 7 of 11 votes to evict | **Sharry**; 11 of 12 votes to evict | **Christine**; 6 of 11 votes to evict | **Kelsey**; 8 of 10 votes to fake evict | **Loveita**; 7 of 9 votes to fake evict | **Loveita**; House's choice to evict | **Mitch**; 5 of 8 votes to evict | **Raul**; 6 of 7 votes to evict | **Maddy**; 5 of 5 votes to evict | **Jared**; 3 of 4 votes to evict | **Nikki**; 3 of 3 votes to evict | **Joel**; 2 of 2 votes to evict | **Cassandra**; Kelsey's choice to evict | **Tim**; Kelsey's choice to evict | **Kelsey**; 2 votes to win |

== Have-Not(s) ==
| | Week 1 | Week 2 | Week 3 | Week 4 | Week 5 | Week 6 | Week 7 | Week 8 | Week 9 | Week 10 | Week 11 |
|---|---|---|---|---|---|---|---|---|---|---|---|
| Have-Nots | none | Cassandra, Joel, Loveita, Sharry | Cassandra, Joel | Jared, Kelsey, Raul, Tim | none | Joel, Maddy, Nick & Phil, Ramsey | Kelsey, Nikki, Raul | Cassandra, Kelsey, Tim | none | | |

== Nomination shortlist ==
| | Week 1 | Week 2 | Week 3 | Week 4 (Note: Due to a fake double eviction, the second eviction of week 4 had no shortlist.) | | Week 5 | Week 6 | Week 7 | Week 8 | Week 9 (Note: Due to a double eviction, the second eviction of week 9 had no shortlist.) | | Week 10 | Week 11 (Note: No nomination ceremony was held for the final eviction, as the nominees were the losers of the Final HoH competition.) | |
|---|---|---|---|---|---|---|---|---|---|---|---|---|---|---|
| HOH | Loveita | Jared | Loveita | Joel | Maddy | Tim | Raul | Maddy | Nick & Phil | Cassandra | Nick & Phil | Kelsey | Nick & Phil | Kelsey |
| Shortlist | Cassandra, Christine, Kelsey, Paige | Loveita, Maddy, Ramsey, Sharry | Cassandra, Christine, Kelsey, Raul | Dallas, Kelsey, Maddy, Raul | none | Dallas, Jared, Maddy, Ramsey | Cassandra, Joel, Mitch, Nick & Phil | Jared, Kelsey, Nick & Phil, Nikki | Jared, Kelsey, Maddy, Ramsey | Jared, Nick & Phil, Nikki, Tim | none | Cassandra, Nick & Phil, Joel, Tim | Cassandra, Kelsey, Tim | none |

== Production ==
=== The House ===
The house this season was the same as the one used in the previous season. The layout of the house remains mostly identical to the previous season however there are some changes (most notably the location of the staircase has changed and there being 2 bedrooms instead of 1). The theme is a Luxury Hotel/Casino theme. The two bedrooms are dubbed the "Hundo Suite" (named after a catchphrase commonly used by Season 2 winner, Jon Pardy) and the "19199 Suite" (named after Season 1 HouseGuest Talla Rejaei and her infamous incident in an HoH comp). The Have-Not room is in the style of a Las Vegas Chapel. Additionally, Marsha the Moose is hiding in the altar in the chapel. The vault has been replaced by a high roller room.

== Ratings ==
| # | Air Date | Canada | | Source |
| # | Air Date | Viewers (millions) | Rank (week) | Source |
|---|---|---|---|---|
| 1 | Wednesday, March 2, 2016 | 1.402 | 18 | |
| 2 | Thursday, March 3, 2016 | 1.224 | 29 | |
| 3 | Sunday, March 6, 2016 | 1.185 | 30 | |
| 4 | Wednesday, March 9, 2016 | 1.230 | 19 | |
| 5 | Thursday, March 10, 2016 | 1.069 | 27 | |
| 6 | Sunday, March 13, 2016 | 1.187 | 23 | |
| 7 | Wednesday, March 16, 2016 | 1.288 | 20 | |
| 8 | Thursday, March 17, 2016 | 1.172 | 25 | |
| 9 | Sunday, March 20, 2016 | 1.146 | 28 | |
| 10 | Wednesday, March 23, 2016 | 1.178 | 26 | |
| 11 | Thursday, March 24, 2016 | <1.096 | >30 | |
| 12 | Sunday, March 27, 2016 | 1.187 | 24 | |
| 13 | Wednesday, March 30, 2016 | 1.302 | 23 | |
| 14 | Thursday, March 31, 2016 | <1.183 | >30 | |
| 15 | Sunday, April 3, 2016 | 1.220 | 26 | |
| 16 | Wednesday, April 6, 2016 | 1.183 | 20 | |
| 17 | Thursday, April 7, 2016 | 1.167 | 23 | |
| 18 | Sunday, April 10, 2016 | 1.178 | 21 | |
| 19 | Wednesday, April 13, 2016 | 1.274 | 21 | |
| 20 | Thursday, April 14, 2016 | <1.182 | >30 | |
| 21 | Sunday, April 17, 2016 | <1.182 | >30 | |
| 22 | Wednesday, April 20, 2016 | 1.244 | 25 | |
| 23 | Thursday, April 21, 2016 | 1.203 | 27 | |
| 24 | Sunday, April 24, 2016 | 1.202 | 28 | |
| 25 | Wednesday, April 27, 2016 | 1.190 | 27 | |
| 26 | Thursday, April 28, 2016 | <1.164 | >30 | |
| 27 | Sunday, May 1, 2016 | 1.184 | 29 | |
| 28 | Wednesday, May 4, 2016 | 1.204 | 27 | |
| 29 | Thursday, May 5, 2016 | <1.178 | >30 | |
| 30 | Sunday, May 8, 2016 | 1.178 | 30 | |
| 31 | Wednesday, May 11, 2016 | 1.171 | 24 | |
| 32 | Thursday, May 12, 2016 | 1.217 | 21 | |
