= Big Brother Canada season 5 =

Big Brother Canada
- Season 5
- Big Brother Canada 5 title card
- Presented by: Arisa Cox
- No. of days: 69
- No. of houseguests: 16
- Winner: Kevin Martin
- Runner-up: Karen Singbeil
- No. of episodes: 29

Release
- Original network: Global
- Original release: March 15 – May 18, 2017

Season chronology
- ← Previous; Season 4 Next → Season 6

Big Brother Canada 5 is the fifth season of the Canadian reality television series Big Brother Canada. It is based upon the Dutch series of the same name, which gained notoriety in 1999 and 2000. It was produced by Endemol USA and Insight Productions. The season premiered on Global on March 15, 2017.

This season saw 8 new HouseGuests compete alongside 8 HouseGuests from prior seasons who returned for a second chance. The HouseGuests lived together in a house with no communication from the outside world and were continuously surveilled by live television cameras. They competed in challenges for power and safety before voting each other out of the house. When only two HouseGuests remained, a jury of nine previously evicted HouseGuests voted for one to win the grand prize of $100,000, a 2017 Toyota 86, as well as a $30,000 home makeover from The Brick. The runner-up received a $20,000 cash prize.

The series ended after 69 days—the shortest full season to date by one day—on May 18, 2017, when returning HouseGuest and poker player Kevin Martin was crowned the winner over new HouseGuest and real estate broker Karen Singbeil.

== HouseGuests ==
The cast of the fifth season of Big Brother Canada. From left to right: Dre, Dillon, Sindy, Demetres, Jackie, Emily, Kevin, Ika, William, Mark, Neda, Dallas, Cassandra, Karen, Gary and Bruno

On March 8, it was revealed that eight returning HouseGuests from seasons past will return to play for another chance at the grand prize. They competed alongside 8 new HouseGuests who had never played the game before.

Name	Age	Occupation	Residence	Result
Kevin Martin Big Brother Canada 3	24	Professional poker player	Calgary, Alberta	Winner; Day 69
Karen Singbeil	53	Real estate broker	Victoria, British Columbia	Runner-up; Day 69
Demetres Giannitsos	25	Oil field instrument technician	Edson, Alberta	Evicted; Day 69
Ika Wong Big Brother Canada 2	32	Financial services manager	Thornhill, Ontario	Evicted; Day 64
Dillon Carman	30	Professional boxer	Madoc, Ontario	Evicted; Day 62
William Laprise Desbiens	23	Marketing student & Blogger	Trois-Rivières, Quebec	Evicted; Day 55
Andre "Dre" Gwenaelle	25	Masters student	Montreal, Quebec	Evicted; Day 55
Jackie McCurrach	22	Professional pizza maker	Port Coquitlam, British Columbia	Evicted; Day 55
Bruno Ielo Big Brother Canada 3	33	Construction worker	Ottawa, Ontario	Evicted; Day 48
Sindy Nguyen Big Brother Canada 3	27	Beauty queen	Toronto, Ontario	Evicted; Day 41
Neda Kalantar Big Brother Canada 2	25	Entrepreneur	Vancouver, British Columbia	Evicted; Day 34
Emily Hawkin	23	Musician & Server	Lindsay, Ontario	Evicted; Day 34
Gary Levy Big Brother Canada 1	25	Artist	Ajax, Ontario	Evicted; Day 27
Cassandra Shahinfar Big Brother Canada 4	23	Marketing manager	Winnipeg, Manitoba	Evicted; Day 20
Dallas Cormier Big Brother Canada 4	25	Lobster fisherman & Welder	Edmonton, Alberta	Evicted; Day 13
Mark Chrysler	24	Bartender	Edmonton, Alberta	Evicted; Day 6

=== Future appearances ===
In 2023, Kevin Martin competed on The Traitors Canada.

In 2024, Martin competed on The Amazing Race Canada 10.

In 2025, Neda Kalantar appeared on the second season of The Traitors Canada. Later that year, Ika Wong and Demetres Giannitsos appeared on The Amazing Race Canada 11.

== Summary ==
On Day 1, eight new HouseGuests entered the futuristic Big Brother Canada House, called the Big Brother Odyssey. Soon after, they were told about the first twist. Eight HouseGuests of previous seasons would re-enter the House and play the game alongside them. Bruno from big brother canada season 3, Cassandra from big brother canada season 4, Dallas from big brother canada season 4, Gary from big brother canada season 1, Ika, from big brother canada season 2 Kevin from big brother canada season 3, Neda from big brother canada season 2, and Sindy from big brother canada season 3 then entered the House. Before the Head of Household competition, each veteran was paired up with a new HouseGuest. The HouseGuests then blasted off in the Dropped in Space Head of Household competition. In this competition, one HouseGuest will be harnessed to the Odyssey and must hold their partner. As the competition goes on, the harnesses will loosen, dragging the HouseGuests at a steeper angle. The last pair standing will win the competition, earn safety for the week, and will gain the right to name any HouseGuest as Head of Household. Karen and Sindy won the competition, and Karen became the first Head of Household. On Day 2, Karen nominated Demetres and Mark for eviction. On Day 3, Karen, Demetres, and Mark, as well as Bruno, Kevin, and Ika went back in time for the Me Want Veto Power of Veto competition. In this competition, HouseGuests had to traverse obstacles with a boulder tied to their ankle to their rock pile. They then had to search for prehistoric emojis that match the paintings on their cave wall. After eight trips, HouseGuests had the opportunity to collect two boulder emojis to remove the boulder from their ankle. Once a HouseGuest has all of their emojis at the cave, they must flip them over to reveal letters and use them to solve a mystery phrase. The first HouseGuest to solve the mystery phrase will win the Power of Veto. Bruno was the winner. On Day 4, Bruno decided not to use the Power of Veto. On Day 6, Mark was evicted by a 7–6 vote, with Bruno, Dallas, Dillon, Emily, Jackie, and Kevin voting to evict Demetres. Arisa then informed the HouseGuests of the first Shock Wave. Canada voted to transport one HouseGuest into the future, thus keeping them safe until the jury begins. Neda was selected to be safe until jury.

Following Mark's eviction, the HouseGuests kicked it in the Balls to the Wall Head of Household competition. HouseGuests competed in head-to-head matches and kicked their ball at the wall. The HouseGuest with the higher score moved on while the other was eliminated. If the ball is touching two spaces at once, HouseGuests will receive the higher number. The last HouseGuest standing will be the new Head of Household. Demetres was the winner. The losers of the head-to-head matches drew cards to determine the Have-Nots for the week. Cassandra, Emily, Ika, and Sindy became Have-Nots for the week. On Day 7, Demetres nominated Dillon and Emily for eviction. Prior to the Power of Veto competition, the competitors were tasked with creating a unique way to dunk an Oreo cookie to be judged by the other HouseGuests. The winner would receive an advantage for the Power of Veto competition. Dre received the advantage. On Day 8, Demetres, Dillon, and Emily, alongside Dre, Neda, and Karen, with Dallas as the host, dunked in the Milkin' It Power of Veto competition, sponsored by Oreo. In this competition, HouseGuests must jump into the tub of milk and soak up as much milk as they can. They must then run to their platform and squeeze the milk into their container. The first HouseGuest to fill their container and retrieve the ball inside will win the Power of Veto, as well as $5000 from Oreo. Dre's advantage gave her some extra milk in her container. Dillon was the winner. On Day 10, Dillon took himself off the block, and Demetres named Dallas as the replacement nominee. On Day 11, the HouseGuests were paired up for a task sponsored by Crest. One person would eat a series of foods, while their partner smelt their breath, trying to identify the food they ate. The pair that identified the most foods received a special dinner date. Dre and Cassandra won and received the dinner date. On Day 13, Dallas was evicted by a 12–0 vote.

Following Dallas' eviction, the HouseGuests were quizzed in the And Scene Head of Household competition. HouseGuests were asked questions based on a soap opera the HouseGuests participated in. An incorrect answer resulted in elimination. The last HouseGuest standing will be the new Head of Household. Neda was the winner. On Day 14, the HouseGuests were schooled in the Food Fight Have-Not competition. Before the competition, Neda selected Dillon, Gary, Karen, Ika, and Dre to be the "cool kids" for the competition. They were immune from being Have-Nots. In this competition, the HouseGuests had to walk across a balance beam and collect food items. The "cool kids" threw dodge balls, attempting to knock them off the balance beam. The four HouseGuests who collected the least amount of food items were the Have-Nots for the week. Bruno, Cassandra, Demetres, and William were Have-Nots for the week. On Day 14, Neda nominated Cassandra and Jackie for eviction, with Cassandra as the target. On Day 15, Neda, Cassandra, Jackie, William, Ika, and Emily strutted their stuff in the Runway to Veto Power of Veto competition. In the first round of the competition, the competitors competed in head-to-head matches. They must watch a model walk down the runway, then recreate the outfit on their mannequin. The HouseGuest who has the fastest overall time will automatically advance to the final round. The last HouseGuest standing will win the Power of Veto. William won the Power of Veto. On Day 17, William decided not to use the Power of Veto. On Day 18, all HouseGuests were put on slop for disrespecting Big Brother. On Day 20, Cassandra was evicted by an 11–0 vote.

Following Cassandra's eviction, Arisa informed the HouseGuests of the next Shock Wave. The next week will be Backwards Week. The HouseGuests were each required to name two HouseGuests for eviction. The two HouseGuests with the most votes would be nominees for the week. Dre and Gary were nominated for eviction. On Day 22, Dre, Gary, Neda, William, Kevin, and Emily went old-fashioned for the Highway to Spell Power of Veto competition. In each round of the competition, HouseGuests had to run down their lane to collect letters from their windshield. They must then spell a word of a specific length in a specific amount of time. If they cannot spell a word, they will be eliminated. In the final round, HouseGuests must use their remaining tiles to spell the longest word they can. The HouseGuest who spells the longest final word will win the Power of Veto. Neda was the winner. On Day 24, Neda decided not to use the Power of Veto. On Day 25, HouseGuests campaigned in the Slop Vote Have-Not competition. In this competition, each HouseGuest privately placed ten cookies into the bucket of the HouseGuests they wanted to be Have-Nots for the week. However, unbeknownst to the HouseGuests, the four HouseGuests with the least cookies would be Have-Nots for the week. Bruno, Demetres, Emily, and William became Have-Nots for the week. On Day 26, the HouseGuests held on in the Heavy Rotation Head of Household competition. In this competition, HouseGuests must lay on the spinning dome while holding onto the handle above their hand. The last HouseGuest standing will be the new Head of Household and will have the sole vote at the eviction. Demetres became the new Head of Household. The HouseGuests received a task to find clues to figure out how to stop the hijacking of the Odyssey. The HouseGuests passed their task and received a sneak preview of Private Eyes. On Day 27, Demetres cast the sole vote to evict Gary.

Following Gary's eviction, the HouseGuests faced their past in the Oh Snap Head of Household competition. In this competition, HouseGuests were asked questions based on video messages from the evicted HouseGuests. An incorrect answer resulted in elimination. The last HouseGuest standing will be the new Head of Household. William was the winner. Karen and Kevin were given a secret mission to throw a tiki party and convince seven people to give them a piece of clothing. If they succeed, there will be no Have-Nots for the week. if they fail, Karen and Kevin will be the only Have-Nots for the week. They passed their task and there were no Have-Nots for the week. Half of the HouseGuests were given a task to create snack bites to represent the other HouseGuests. The tasters must identify which taster the snack represents. If they can identify four snacks, the HouseGuests will receive a reward. The HouseGuests passed their task and received a campfire sleepover. On Day 28, William nominated Dillon and Emily for eviction. On Day 29, William, Dillon, and Emily, joined by Karen, Dre, and Kevin, flipped out in the Flip It to Win Power of Veto competition, sponsored by the Brick. In this competition, HouseGuests will compete in head-to-head matches. In each round, they will be shown a series of items from the Brick. They will then be asked a question based on the items. They must go to the items and flip over the cards next to the correct answer and buzz in. The HouseGuest who correctly flips the most items quicker will win the round and eliminate their opponent. The last HouseGuest standing will win the Power of Veto and a $5000 gift card from the Brick. Kevin was the winner. He was given the opportunity to double his money by finding the two correct couch cushions. He was successful and earned another $5000. On Day 31, Kevin decided not to use the Power of Veto. On Day 34, Emily was evicted by a vote of 8–1. The HouseGuests were then informed that Neda's immunity was up and that it was a double eviction. The HouseGuests immediately competed in the Before or After Head of Household competition. In this competition, HouseGuests had to answer if one event happened before or after another event. If they were incorrect, they were eliminated. The last HouseGuest standing will be the new Head of Household. Sindy was the winner. Sindy nominated Dillon and Jackie for eviction. Sindy, Dillon and Jackie, along with Neda, Ika and Karen got tangled in the Wired for Veto Power of Veto competition. In this competition, HouseGuests climbed through their structure to untangle their rope. The first HouseGuest to untangle their rope enough to hit their buzzer will win the Power of Veto. Jackie was the winner. During the commercial break, Ika convinced Sindy to put up Neda as the replacement nominee, citing her bullying as one reason. This led to a blow-up in the storage room, cementing Neda's fate. At the Veto Meeting, Jackie took herself off the block, and Sindy named Neda as the replacement nominee. On Day 34, Neda was evicted by a vote of 7–1, with Jackie voting to evict Dillon. She became the first member of the jury.

Following Emily and Neda's eviction, the HouseGuests stuck it out for the Buzzkilled Head of Household competition. In this competition, HouseGuests must wait for the buzzer to sound. Once it does, they must hit their button. Throughout the competition, Big Brother will make them offers to lure them away from their button, such as food, money, and Have cards to avoid being Have-Nots, and the opportunity for safety. The last HouseGuest to ring in will be eliminated. The last HouseGuest standing will be the new Head of Household. Dillon was the winner. Bruno, Jackie, and Kevin became Have-Nots for the week, and William won safety for the week. On Day 35, Dillon nominated Demetres and Jackie for eviction. On Day 36, Dillon, Demetres, Jackie, Ika, William, and Sindy rolled in the Out of Orbit Power of Veto competition. In this competition, HouseGuests must roll their ball up and around the loop and catch it on the other side. Each time they catch it, they will complete one rotation. If they drop the ball, their counter will drop to zero. The first person to complete three hundred consecutive rotations will win the Power of Veto. Demetres was the winner. On Day 37, the HouseGuests were given the task to clean the House. During the task, William found a clue to a secret power in the House. After following the clues, William found a secret Power of Veto that can be anonymously used at one of the next two veto meetings. On Day 38, Demetres took himself off the block and Sindy was named as the replacement nominee. On Day 40, the HouseGuests were given a task, sponsored by ParticipACTION. Each HouseGuest was given a step counter, with the task to reach 1,500 steps. The first HouseGuest to accomplish this goal will receive an advantage in the upcoming Head of Household competition. Karen received the advantage. On Day 41, Sindy was evicted by a 6–1 vote, with Kevin voting to evict Jackie. She became the second member of the jury.

Following Sindy's eviction, the HouseGuests pumped their blood in the Get Moving Head of Household competition. In this competition, HouseGuests must first transfer 150 rocks across their lane. If they drop a rock, they must start over. Karen's advantage gave her only 75 rocks to transfer. The first four HouseGuests to finish will advance to the second round. Bruno, Kevin, Demetres, and Karen moved on to the second round. In the second round, HouesGuests must paddle 150 strokes in their kayak. The first two to complete 150 strokes will move on to the final round. Demetres and Bruno moved on to the final round. In the final round, HouseGuests must toss six beanbags into the hole, land six discs into the target, and bowl a strike in 150 seconds. If they both fail, they must start again. The first HouseGuest to complete the tasks in time will be the new Head of Household. Demetres was the winner. The HouseGuests received a party to celebrate Canada's 150th birthday, which revealed there would be no Have-Nots for the week. On Day 42, Demetres nominated Bruno and Kevin for eviction. On Day 43, Demetres, Bruno, and Kevin selected Ika, William, and Dre for the 100 Minutes of Heaven Power of Veto competition. In this competition, HouseGuests must lie in their coffin and hit their button when they believe 100 minutes has passed. During their competition, they will be dealt distractions to disturb them. The HouseGuest who hits their button the closest to 100 minutes will win the Power of Veto. William was the winner. On Day 45, William decided not to use the Power of Veto. He did, however, decide to use his secret Power of Veto on Kevin. Demetres named Karen as the replacement nominee. On Day 46, the HouseGuests were given a task. They must find a series of teddy bears. Depending on which bear they find, they will receive various rewards and punishments. Jackie received a season long slop pass. Ika, Demetres, and Kevin had to take a polar bear swim. Demetres had to wear a bear suit and sleep outside in a cave for the rest of the week. Kevin received $1000 from the Brick. On Day 48, Bruno was evicted by a 5–1 vote, with Kevin voting to evict Karen. He became the third member of the jury.

Following Bruno's eviction, the HouseGuests held strong in the Pressed for Power Head of Household competition. In this competition, HouseGuests must press their weights against their plates with their arms outstretched. If they drop a weight, they will be eliminated. The last HouseGuest standing will be the new Head of Household. Kevin was the winner. For being the first three to drop during the Head of Household competition, Karen, Ika, and Jackie became Have-Nots for the week. On Day 49, the HouseGuests were given the task to play a game of "Dare or Darer" and complete a series of dares. They completed their task and received a pizza party. On Day 49, Kevin nominated Demetres and Ika for eviction. On Day 50, Kevin, Demetres, and Ika drew Dillon, Dre, and Jackie to compete in the Toyota Triathlon Power of Veto competition. In this competition, HouseGuests will hop inside the car and read the teleprompter. At the blanks, they must fill in the appropriate information based on the facts they learned earlier in the season. Then they must race along the track and place the signs in the order they were said during the commercial with Nick and Phil Paquette earlier in the season. They must then use their pieces to complete the puzzle. The HouseGuest who completes all of the tasks in the fastest time will win the Power of Veto and a test drive in the Toyota '86 with a juror of their choice. Demetres was the winner. On Day 52, Demetres took himself off the block and Kevin named Jackie as the replacement nominee. Despite originally wanting to split up Demetres and Ika, the House considered flipping on Jackie to keep a bigger target in the game. On Day 55, Jackie was evicted by a 4–1 vote, with Dre voting to evict Ika. She became the fourth member of the jury. The HouseGuests were then informed of the Triple Eviction. Immediately, the HouseGuests recalled in the Big Brother Headlines Head of Household competition. HouseGuests were asked a series of questions based on past competitions and events. An incorrect answer resulted in elimination. The last HouseGuest standing will be the new Head of Household. Demetres was the winner. He nominated Dre, Kevin, and William for eviction. Then, everyone except Demetres grappled in the Off the Blocks Power of Veto competition. In this competition, HouseGuests must race down their lane to their ball pit. They must find the names of HouseGuests who were taken off the block with the Power of Veto and take them one at a time to their puzzle board. The first HouseGuest to complete their puzzle board correctly will win the Power of Veto. Kevin was the winner. At the Veto Meeting, Kevin took himself off the block, and Demetres named Dillon as the replacement nominee. On Day 55, Dre and William were evicted by a 3–0–0 vote. They became the fifth and sixth members of the jury.

Following Jackie, Dre, and William's eviction, the HouseGuests sobered up for the Drunk Speeches Head of Household competition. In this competition, HouseGuests must listen to a series of speeches given by HouseGuests. However, the speeches are morphed to sound as if they were spoken while drunk. They must identify what day the speech took place. The HouseGuest with the most points at the end will be the new Head of Household. Kevin was the winner. On Day 56, Karen was given a secret mission from Marsha the Moose. She must scare the rest of the HouseGuests by assigning them fake punishments in exchange for a fake $10,000. If she succeeds, there will be no Have-Nots for the rest of the season. She passed her task and Have-Nots were disbanded. On Day 56, Kevin nominated Demetres and Ika for eviction. On Day 57, the HouseGuests went to the beach in the Baywatch Power of Veto competition. In this competition, HouseGuests must first find the dummies in their color. They must then untie their buoy, climb over the wall, and rescue their dummies. They must take their five dummies back to the beach one at a time. After they save all of their dummies, they must dig in the sand to find their puzzle pieces, and complete their surfboard puzzle. The first HouseGuest to complete their puzzle will win the Power of Veto, as well as a special screening of "Baywatch". Kevin was the winner and selected Dillon and Karen to join him for the movie. On Day 58, the HouseGuests were given the task to follow commands from the malfunctioning Big Brother. On Day 59, Kevin took Ika off the block and named Dillon as the replacement nominee. On Day 62, Dillon was evicted by a 2–0 vote. He became the seventh member of the jury.

Following Dillon's eviction, the HouseGuests sought a spot in the final three in the Solve for X Head of Household competition. In this competition, HouseGuests watched the monitor that would slowly reveal information about a specific week in the House, such as the Head of Household, nominees, and Have-Nots. In each round, one piece of information will be crossed off. The HouseGuests must correctly identify the information that was left out. The first HouseGuest to buzz in with the correct answer will receive a point. The HouseGuest with the most points will be the new Head of Household. Demetres was the winner. Nikki Grahame surprised the HouseGuests to dress them up for the Big Brother Canada Awards. The HouseGuests had the opportunity to watch memorable moments from the season. On Day 63, Demetres nominated Karen and Kevin for eviction. On Day 63, the HouseGuests laid it all on the line in The Down Under final Power of Veto competition. In this competition, HouseGuests must place a series of questions in chronological order in the universe above. They must then head to the alternate universe beneath them and place the correct answer corresponding to the questions. The HouseGuest who correctly organizes and completes the questions and answers the fastest will win the Power of Veto. Kevin was the winner. On Day 64, Kevin took himself off the block, and Demetres named Ika as the replacement nominee. On Day 64, Kevin cast the sole vote to evict Ika. She became the eighth member of the jury.

Following Ika's eviction, the HouseGuests engaged in their final battle in the Jungle Fever Part 1 of the Final Head of Household competition. In this competition, HouseGuests must climb their ruins, grab a gold bar, and slide down their ramp into the mud pit. They must then place their bar on their platform, balance the platform with their rope, hook their rope and repeat it. If their bars collapse, they must start over. The first HouseGuest to complete their pyramid will win Part 1 of the Final Head of Household competition and advance to Part 3. Demetres was the winner. Karen and Kevin then faced off in the When Stars Align Part 2 of the Final Head of Household competition. in this competition, HouseGuests must map out five constellations based on events of the season. For each constellation, they must loop their rope around the stars that apply to the question. They must then hit their button. If they are correct, their stars will illuminate and they can move on to the next constellation. The HouseGuest who complete all of the constellations quicker will win Part 2 and face Demetres in Part 3. Kevin was the winner. On Day 69, Demetres and Kevin had the final showdown in the Jury Questions Part 3 of the Final Head of Household competition. In this competition, HouseGuests were asked a series of questions about members of the jury. The HouseGuest with the most points after seven questions will be the final Head of Household of the season. Kevin became the final Head of Household. On Day 69, Kevin cast the sole vote to evict Demetres. He became the ninth and final member of the jury. On Day 69, after receiving all of the jury's votes, Karen was deemed the runner-up and walked away with $20,000, and Kevin left the House with $100,000, a 2017 Toyota '86, a home makeover from the Brick, and was deemed the winner of Big Brother Canada 5.

== Voting history ==
Color key:

Winner
Runner-up
Head of Household
Nominated for eviction
Immune from eviction
Votes to Save
Evicted

	Week 1	Week 2	Week 3	Week 4 (Note: This week was "Backwards Week", with the week's competitions and ceremonies played in reverse order. Following Week 3's Eviction, an Instant House Vote was held to determine Nominations. Dre and Gary received the most votes and were both nominated. Then, the HouseGuests competed in the PoV competition. Finally, the HouseGuests (excluding Neda, as outgoing HoH and Dre and Gary, as the nominees) competed in the HoH competition, with that HoH having the power to evict either nominee at the Eviction. The vote in bold denotes the sole eviction vote.)	Week 5		Week 6	Week 7	Week 8		Week 9	Week 10		
	Week 1	Week 2	Week 3	Week 4	Day 28	Day 34 (Note: This week was a double eviction week. Following the first eviction, the remaining HouseGuests played a week's worth of games, including Head of Household and veto competitions, and nomination, veto and eviction ceremonies, during the live show, culminating in a second eviction for the week.)	Week 6	Week 7	Day 49	Day 55 (Note: This week was a triple eviction week. Following the regular eviction, the remaining HouseGuests played a modified week's worth of games, including HoH and Veto competitions and their respective ceremonies during the remainder of the live show. The Head of Household was obliged to nominate three HouseGuests for eviction. Additionally, the voting HouseGuests would vote to save rather than to evict, with the HouseGuest with the most votes to save being the sole nominee surviving the vote for that cycle.)	Week 9	Day 63	Day 69	Finale
Head of Household	Karen (Note: The HouseGuests competed in pairs of one new and one returnee HouseGuest. The winning pair won Immunity for the week and the power to name any HouseGuest as Head of Household. The winning pair was Karen & Sindy, who chose Karen as the Head of Household.)	Demetres	Neda	Demetres	William	Sindy	Dillon	Demetres	Kevin	Demetres	Kevin	Demetres	Kevin	(None)
Nominations (pre-veto)	Demetres; Mark	Dillon; Emily	Cassandra; Jackie	Dre; Gary	Dillon; Emily	Dillon; Jackie	Demetres; Jackie	Bruno; Kevin	Demetres; Ika	Dre; Kevin; William	Demetres; Ika	Karen; Kevin	Demetres; Karen	(None)
Veto Winner(s)	Bruno	Dillon	William	Neda	Kevin	Jackie	Demetres	William; William (Note: Big Brother hid clues for a special power throughout the house. William found the clues and subsequently found a "Secret Power of Veto". With this PoV, he could save a nominee at the Veto Ceremony anonymously.)	Demetres	Kevin	Kevin	Kevin	(None)	(None)
Nominations (post-veto)	Demetres; Mark	Dallas; Emily	Cassandra; Jackie	Dre; Gary	Dillon; Emily	Dillon; Neda	Jackie; Sindy	Bruno; Karen	Ika; Jackie	Dillon; Dre; William	Demetres; Dillon	Ika; Karen	(None)	(None)
Kevin	Demetres	Dallas	Cassandra	Dre, Gary	Emily	Neda	Jackie	Karen	Head of Household	Dillon	Head of Household	Ika	Demetres (Note: As Head of Household, Kevin chose to evict Demetres.)	**Winner** (Day 69)
Karen	Head of Household	Dallas	Cassandra	Kevin, Jackie	Emily	Neda	Sindy	Nominated	Jackie	Dillon	Dillon	Nominated	Nominated	**Runner-up** (Day 69)
Demetres	Nominated	Head of Household	Cassandra	Dillon, Jackie; **Gary**	Emily	Neda	Sindy	Head of Household	Jackie	Head of Household	Nominated	Head of Household	Evicted (Day 69)	Kevin
Ika	Mark	Dallas	Cassandra	Dillon, Emily	Emily	Neda	Sindy	Bruno	Nominated	Dillon	Dillon	Nominated	Evicted (Day 64)	Kevin
Dillon	Demetres	Dallas	Cassandra	Dre, Gary	Nominated	Nominated	Head of Household	Bruno	Jackie	Nominated	Nominated	Evicted (Day 62)		Kevin
William	Mark	Dallas	Cassandra	Bruno, Dillon	Head of Household	Neda	Sindy (Note: William found a card in the Head of Household competition that awarded him Immunity for the week.)	Bruno	Jackie	Nominated	Evicted (Day 55)			Kevin
Dre	Mark	Dallas	Cassandra	Dillon, Emily	Dillon	Neda	Sindy	Bruno	Ika	Nominated	Evicted (Day 55)			Kevin
Jackie	Demetres	Dallas	Nominated	Dre, Gary	Emily	Dillon	Nominated	Bruno	Nominated	Evicted (Day 55)				Kevin
Bruno	Demetres	Dallas	Cassandra	Dre, Gary	Emily	Neda	Sindy	Nominated	Evicted (Day 48)					Kevin
Sindy	Mark	Dallas	Cassandra	Dre, William	Emily	Head of Household	Nominated	Evicted (Day 41)						Kevin
Neda	Mark	Dallas (Note: The HouseGuest awarded the Time Warp will have Immunity from eviction until the Jury Phase of the game.)	Head of Household	Dre, Gary	Emily	Nominated	Evicted (Day 34)							Kevin
Emily	Demetres	Nominated	Cassandra	Dre, Gary	Nominated	Evicted (Day 34)								
Gary	Mark	Dallas	Cassandra	Dillon, Emily	Evicted (Day 27)									
Cassandra	Mark	Dallas	Nominated	Evicted (Day 20)										
Dallas	Demetres	Nominated	Evicted (Day 13)											
Mark	Nominated	Evicted (Day 6)												
Evicted	**Mark**; 7 of 13 votes to evict	**Dallas**; 12 of 12 votes to evict	**Cassandra**; 11 of 11 votes to evict	**Gary**; Demetres' choice to evict	**Emily**; 8 of 9 votes to evict	**Neda**; 7 of 8 votes to evict	**Sindy**; 6 of 7 votes to evict	**Bruno**; 5 of 6 votes to evict	**Jackie**; 4 of 5 votes to evict	**Dre**; 0 of 3 votes to save	**Dillon**; 2 of 2 votes to evict	**Ika**; Kevin's choice to evict	**Demetres**; Kevin' choice to evict	**Kevin**; 9 votes to win
Evicted	**Mark**; 7 of 13 votes to evict	**Dallas**; 12 of 12 votes to evict	**Cassandra**; 11 of 11 votes to evict	**Gary**; Demetres' choice to evict	**Emily**; 8 of 9 votes to evict	**Neda**; 7 of 8 votes to evict	**Sindy**; 6 of 7 votes to evict	**Bruno**; 5 of 6 votes to evict	**Jackie**; 4 of 5 votes to evict	**William**; 0 of 3 votes to save	**Dillon**; 2 of 2 votes to evict	**Ika**; Kevin's choice to evict	**Demetres**; Kevin' choice to evict	**Karen**; 0 votes to win

== Have-Not(s) ==
	Week 1	Week 2	Week 3 (Note: All houseguests were put on slop for bad behavior towards Big Brother.)	Week 4 (Note: Demetres won the HoH competition, and as a result was exempt from being a Have-Not.)	Week 5 (Note: Karen and Kevin successfully completed a house task which resulted in there being no Have-Nots for the week.)	Week 6	Week 7	Week 8 (Note: Jackie won a slop pass in a special task during Week 7, exempting her from eating slop for the rest of the season. However, it did not exempt her from sleeping in the Have-Not room if she did become a Have-Not.)	Week 9	Week 10
Have-Nots	none	Cassandra, Emily, Ika, Sindy	Bruno, Cassandra, Demetres, William	Bruno, ~~Demetres~~, Emily, William	none	Bruno, Jackie, Kevin	none	Ika, Jackie, Karen	none	

== Nomination shortlist ==
	Week 1	Week 2	Week 3	Week 4 (Note: Due to a nomination vote, week 4 had no shortlist.)	Week 5 (Note: Due to a double eviction, the second round of week 5 had no shortlist.)		Week 6	Week 7	Week 8 (Note: Due to a triple eviction, the second round of week 8 had no shortlist.)		Week 9	Week 10 (Note: No nomination ceremony was held for the final eviction, as the nominees were the losers of the Final HoH competition.)	
HOH	Karen	Demetres	Neda	Demetres	William	Sindy	Dillon	Demetres	Kevin	Demetres	Kevin	Demetres	Kevin
Shortlist	Demetres, Dillon, Kevin, Mark	Dallas, Dillon, Emily, Jackie	Cassandra, Dillon, Gary, Jackie	none	Bruno, Dillon, Emily, Jackie	none	Demetres, Ika, Jackie, Sindy	Bruno, Jackie, Kevin, William	Demetres, Dre, Ika, Jackie	none	Demetres, Dillon, Ika, Karen	Ika, Karen, Kevin	none

== Production ==
Having aired fourteen seasons of the United States' edition in the country, it was confirmed that Canada would receive its own edition of the program in 2013. The new series was produced by Endemol USA and Insight Productions. The first season aired on Slice and proved to be a ratings hit for the network, averaging a total of 2.7 million viewers throughout its course. The show's first two seasons were nominated for five Canadian Screen Awards in 2014 and 2015. The fifth season was officially confirmed by Global on June 7, 2016, through their Twitter account. Host Arisa Cox later confirmed that the Big Brother Side Show had been replaced with a weekly Facebook Live chat with the evicted houseguest.

== Reception ==
=== Critical reception ===
Big Brother Canada 5 received universal acclaim from fans and critics of the show, with many generally considered this season as the best in the show's history. Consistent praise went to the cast, the dynamics, and the tension inside the house. The gameplay and strategy of the cast were praised as well. Individually, the gameplay of Kevin Robert Martin, Ika Wong and Demetres Giannitsos received particular praise. The Double Eviction, which is the 14th episode of the season, aired on 13 April 2017, was acclaimed and would be labelled by some as one of the greatest North American Big Brother episodes ever.

=== Ratings ===
#	Air Date	Canada		Source
#	Air Date	Viewers (millions)	Rank (week)	Source
1	Wednesday, March 15, 2017	1.164	17	
2	Thursday, March 16, 2017	1.012	24	
3	Monday, March 20, 2017	0.915	28	
4	Wednesday, March 22, 2017	1.055	19	
5	Thursday, March 23, 2017	0.967	25	
6	Monday, March 27, 2017	<0.967	>30	
7	Wednesday, March 29, 2017	1.085	23	
8	Thursday, March 30, 2017	0.988	28	
9	Monday, April 3, 2017	0.949	29	
10	Wednesday, April 5, 2017	1.167	19	
11	Thursday, April 6, 2017	0.964	28	
12	Monday, April 10, 2017	1.047	21	
13	Wednesday, April 12, 2017	0.998	24	
14	Thursday, April 13, 2017	0.971	25	
15	Monday, April 17, 2017	0.938	24	
16	Wednesday, April 19, 2017	1.101	16	
17	Thursday, April 20, 2017	0.919	26	
18	Monday, April 24, 2017	0.932	30	
19	Wednesday, April 26, 2017	1.017	25	
20	Thursday, April 27, 2017	0.967	27	
21	Monday, May 1, 2017	0.989	30	
22	Wednesday, May 3, 2017	1.038	26	
23	Thursday, May 4, 2017	1.020	29	
24	Monday, May 8, 2017	<0.946	>30	
25	Wednesday, May 10, 2017	1.078	24	
26	Thursday, May 11, 2017	<0.946	>30	
27	Monday, May 15, 2017	0.945	27	
28	Wednesday, May 17, 2017	1.149	16	
29	Thursday, May 18, 2017	1.011	24	
