= Big Brother Canada season 2 =

Big Brother Canada
- Season 2
- Big Brother Canada 2 title card
- Presented by: Arisa Cox
- No. of days: 71
- No. of houseguests: 15
- Winner: Jon Pardy
- Runner-up: Sabrina Abbate
- Companion shows: Big Brother Canada: After Dark; Big Brother: Side Show
- No. of episodes: 29

Release
- Original network: Slice
- Original release: March 5 – May 8, 2014

Season chronology
- ← Previous; Season 1 Next → Season 3

Big Brother Canada 2 is the second season of the Canadian reality television series Big Brother Canada. The season began airing on March 5, 2014. Like the inaugural season, it featured fifteen new HouseGuests competing to win the show's grand prize. Arisa Cox returned to host the series, which continued to air on the Slice network. The second season lasted for a total of ten weeks, concluding on May 8, 2014 when Jon Pardy was crowned the winner. Similar to its predecessor, it was a ratings hit for the network. It has been cited by fans as one of the show's best seasons.

== HouseGuests ==
The cast of the second season of Big Brother Canada. From left to right: Ika, Kenny, Sarah, Jon, Kyle, Neda, Anick, Paul, Heather, Arlie, Rachelle, Adel, Andrew, Sabrina, Nate, Contessa and Allison

The cast of the second season was revealed on February 28, 2014.

Name	Age	Occupation	Residence	Entry	Result
Jon Pardy	23	Student	Clarenville, Newfoundland	1	Winner; Day 71
Sabrina Abbate	25	Makeup artist & Hair stylist	Laval, Quebec	1	Runner-up; Day 71
Neda Kalantar	22	Freelance fashion stylist	Vancouver, British Columbia	1	Evicted; Day 71
Heather Decksheimer	23	Modelling agency coordinator	Edmonton, Alberta	1	Evicted; Day 67
Adel Elseri	27	Inventor & Welder	Edmonton, Alberta	1	Evicted; Day 64
Rachelle Diamond	20	College student	Edmonton, Alberta	1	Evicted; Day 57
Allison White (Note: Allison was voted into the house by Canada.)	25	Registered nurse	St. John's, Newfoundland	15	Evicted; Day 51
Arlie Shaban	25	Unemployed	Stouffville, Ontario	1	Evicted; Day 50
Kenny Brain	25	Model	Grand Falls-Windsor, Newfoundland	1	Evicted; Day 43
Sarah Miller	32	Mortgage broker	Langley, British Columbia	1	Evicted; Day 43
Andrew Gordon	27	Restaurant manager	Calgary, Alberta	1	Evicted; Day 36
Ika Wong	29	Hair stylist	Thornhill, Ontario	1	Evicted; Day 29
Paul Jackson	43	Motivational speaker & Consultant	Toronto, Ontario	1	Evicted; Day 22
Kyle Shore	24	Personal trainer	Porters Lake, Nova Scotia	1	Evicted; Day 15
Anick Gervais	28	Reiki master	Hanmer, Ontario	1	Evicted; Day 8

Previous Potential HouseGuests

Name	Age	Occupation	Residence
Nate Sandri	23	Custom sheet metal fabricator	Burnaby, British Columbia
Scott "Contessa" Bosse	36	Medical secretary & Drag queen	Halifax, Nova Scotia

=== Future appearances ===
In 2017, HouseGuests Neda Kalantar and Ika Wong returned to participate in the show's fifth season.

In 2025, Kalantar also competed on the second season of The Traitors Canada. Later that year, Wong competed on The Amazing Race Canada 11.

== Season summary ==
=== Days 1-36 ===
The original fourteen HouseGuests entered the House on 27 February, referred to as Day 1. Andrew, Arlie, Kenny, Sarah, and Sabrina were the first five to enter, and made an alliance with one another. Paul won the "On Thin Ice" competition that night; Heather won $1,000 and Ika was punished by having to wear her swimsuit for two days. The remaining houseguests agreed and subsequently dropped out, making Paul the first Head of Household. He chose to nominate Andrew and Anick for eviction, the former being his target. Sabrina, Kyle, and Adel were chosen to compete with Paul and his nominations in the "Cut and Grab" Power of Veto competition; Andrew won. He removed himself from the block, with Ika being the replacement nominee. Anick was evicted on Day 8 in a unanimous vote. Allison, Nate, and Scott entered the War Room moments later, while Andrew went on to win the "Fresh From the Farm" competition. Heather, Neda, Rachelle, and Sarah became the Have-Nots for coming last in the competition. Paul and Neda were nominated on Day 10. On Day 11, HouseGuests were given a task to clean the House. Kenny, Sarah, and Sabrina were chosen to compete in the "Divergent Veto" Power of Veto competition, which Kenny won. On Day 12, Kenny removed Neda from the block and Kyle was nominated in her place as the house's target. Seen as the bigger physical threat, Kyle was evicted on Day 15.

Ika won the "Big Brother Tabloid" competition following Kyle's eviction. Allison was confirmed as the fifteenth HouseGuest, and entered the House moments later. She was not permitted to inform the other HouseGuests of the War Room or that she had been voted in by the viewers; she was given immunity for her first week. Allison, Jon, and Paul lost the "Big Brother Bottle Service" competition on Day 16 and became Have-Nots. Ika chose to nominate Heather and Paul on Day 17, targeting Heather for eviction. That night, Neda, Arlie, and Andrew were chosen to compete in the "Nuts To That" competition. Ika won the competition, becoming the first woman in Big Brother Canada history to win the Power of Veto. Adel won the "Buzzworthy" task on Day 18, winning information from the outside world as well as the power to replace any HouseGuest in one upcoming Power of Veto competition. Ika left nominations intact on Day 19, with Paul being evicted on Day 22.

Rachelle won the "Hang in There For HoH" endurance competition, and named Adel, Arlie, Heather, and Sabrina the Have-Nots for the week. Allison and Jon passed a secret mission and won a party for the House on Day 23. Rachelle nominated Allison and Heather on Day 24, though Allison won the Power of Veto in the "Lacrosse Fire" competition that night. Arlie passed a task from Marsha the Moose on Day 25; Marsha returned after the fan's got the Fan Meter to a certain level. The reward saw season one HouseGuest Talla Rejaei enter the House. Allison removed herself from the block on Day 26, with Ika being nominated as the target in her place. On Day 27, Ika solved a puzzle in the House and earned the right to choose between receiving $5,000 or letters for all the HouseGuests from their loved ones; she chose the money, causing much drama in the House. Ika was evicted on Day 29. Following her eviction, the HouseGuests learned that Canada was this week's Head of Household, and would nominate two of them for eviction. Adel and Jon became the Have-Nots after losing the Prom themed Have-Not competition. Andrew and Sabrina were announced as the nominations on Day 31. Jon won the "Big Brother Airlines" competition, and left Canada's nominations intact on Day 33. Had the Power of Veto been used, Kenny would have been nominated. That night, HouseGuests were given gear to camp in the backyard, as well as alcohol. Andrew was evicted on Day 36.

=== Days 36-71 ===
Heather won the "Blindside" competition on Day 36. She named Kenny, Rachelle, and Sarah the Have-Nots for the week; Rachelle ate a peach while on the slop diet, and resulted in the entire House being placed on slop for 48 hours. Allison and Kenny were nominated for eviction on Day 38; Kenny won the "Yukon Gold" Power of Veto competition that night. The Fan Meter hit six million, resulting in a hidden Power of Veto being placed in the House; Allison found the special power. Allison revealed the First Five alliance to Heather, which she had learned about from Andrew. This resulted in the formation of the Sloppy Seconds alliance consisting of Allison, Heather, Neda, Jon, Adel, and Arlie. Kenny removed himself from the block on Day 40, with Sarah being nominated in his place. Allison chose not to use her secret Power of Veto this week. Sarah was evicted on Day 36, and the House learned that it would be a double eviction night. Neda won the "We're Counting on This" competition and chose to nominate Rachelle and Sabrina for eviction. Arlie won the "Dumpster Diving For Day-Old Doughnuts" competition, saving Rachelle and resulting in Kenny being nominated in her place. Allison once more chose not to use her secret Power of Veto. Kenny was then evicted from the House.

Jon won the "How We Roll" competition following the double eviction. On Day 45, Rachelle and Sabrina were nominated for eviction. When Jon won the "Get Packing for the PoV" competition that night, he debated using it to send either Arlie or Allison out of the House. On Day 47, Jon used the Power of Veto on Rachelle and nominated Arlie in her place. Allison then chose to use her secret Power of Veto to remove Sabrina from the block, replacing her with Adel. Arlie was evicted from the House on Day 50. Neda won the following "Pure 21" competition, and the House learned that this week would be an instant eviction. She was taken to the War Room where she chose to nominate Allison and Sabrina, targeting Allison as she believed she was a fan favourite. Allison was evicted from the House on Day 51. Adel won "The Eyes Have It" competition following her eviction. He chose to nominate Rachelle and Sabrina for eviction. Neda won the "Big Brother STAMPede" competition, and on Day 54 left nominations the same. Due to the Fan Meter, Neda was voted by the viewers to receive a meeting with former HouseGuests Jillian MacLaughlin and Emmett Blois for advice on the game. Rachelle was evicted from the House on Day 57.

Jon won the subsequent "On the Ropes" competition, and decided to target Heather for eviction. He chose to nominate Heather and Sabrina on Day 59. In the early hours of Day 60, Heather won the "Blown Away" Power of Veto competition and Neda won a $3,000 prize. Late on Day 60, the HouseGuests were permitted to briefly see one loved one in the War Room by giving up a personal belonging in exchange; every HouseGuest accepted. On Day 61, Heather removed herself from the block and Adel was nominated in her place. Adel was evicted on Day 64. Sabrina won the "Before or After" competition, ensuring her spot in the show's finale. Former HouseGuest Gary Levy entered the House on Day 65 to host the annual awards ceremony. She nominated Heather and Jon for eviction that night, hoping to evict Jon. He won the "MarshaLand" final Power of Veto on Day 66, and removed himself from the block on Day 67. He cast the sole vote to evict Heather minutes later. Jon won the "Big Brother Bail Out" competition, the first in the three-part final Head of Household competition. Neda won the "Walk the Plank" portion of the competition, meaning Jon and Neda would face off in the final round. On Day 71, Jon won the "Jury Statements" competition and became the final Head of Household of the season; he shockingly chose to evict Neda, making Jon and Sabrina the final two HouseGuests. The HouseGuests learned that Canada had been given a jury vote this season; Jon went on to win in a six to one vote.

== Voting history ==
Color key:

Winner
Runner-up
Head of Household
Nominated for eviction
Immune from eviction
Evicted
Entered the game

	Week 1	Week 2	Week 3	Week 4	Week 5	Week 6		Week 7		Week 8		Week 9	Week 10		
	Week 1	Week 2	Week 3	Week 4	Week 5	Day 37	Day 43 (Note: This week was a double eviction week. Following the first eviction, the remaining HouseGuests played a week's worth of games, including Head of Household and veto competitions, and nomination, veto and eviction ceremonies, during the live show, culminating in a second eviction for the week.)	Day 44	Day 47	Day 51 (Note: This week was an instant eviction week. Immediately after nominations, the HouseGuests were instructed to cast their votes to evict.)	Day 52	Week 9	Day 65	Day 71	Finale
Head of Household	Paul	Andrew	Ika	Rachelle	Canada	Heather	Neda	Jon		Neda	Adel	Jon	Sabrina	Jon	(None)
Nominations (pre-veto)	Andrew; Anick	Neda; Paul	Heather; Paul	Allison; Heather	Andrew; Sabrina	Allison; Kenny	Rachelle; Sabrina	Rachelle; Sabrina	Arlie; Sabrina	Allison; Sabrina	Rachelle; Sabrina	Heather; Sabrina	Heather; Jon	Neda; Sabrina	(None)
Veto Winner(s)	Andrew	Kenny	Ika	Allison	Jon	Kenny	Arlie	Jon	Allison (Note: Allison acquired the Hidden Power of Veto.)	(None)	Neda	Heather	Jon	(None)	(None)
Nominations (post-veto)	Anick; Ika	Kyle; Paul	Heather; Paul	Heather; Ika	Andrew; Sabrina	Allison; Sarah	Kenny; Sabrina	Arlie; Sabrina	Adel; Arlie	(None)	Rachelle; Sabrina	Adel; Sabrina	Heather; Neda	(None)	(None)
Jon	Anick	Kyle	Paul	Ika	Andrew	Sarah	Kenny	Head of Household		Allison	Rachelle	Head of Household	Heather	Neda (Note: As Head of Household, Jon chose to evict Neda.)	Winner (Day 71)
Sabrina	Anick	Kyle	Heather	Ika	Nominated	Allison	Nominated	Nominated	Arlie	Nominated	Nominated	Nominated	Head of Household	Nominated	Runner-up (Day 71)
Neda	Anick	Kyle	Heather	Ika	Andrew	Sarah	Head of Household	No Voting	Arlie	Head of Household	Rachelle	Adel	Nominated	Evicted (Day 71)	Jon
Heather	Anick	Kyle	Nominated	Nominated	Andrew	Head of Household	Kenny	No Voting	Arlie	Allison	Rachelle	Adel	Nominated	Evicted (Day 67)	Jon
Adel	Anick	Paul	Heather	Heather	Andrew	Sarah	Kenny	No Voting	Nominated	Allison	Head of Household	Nominated	Evicted (Day 64)		Jon
Rachelle	Anick	Kyle	Heather	Head of Household	Andrew	Allison	Sabrina	No Voting	Arlie	Allison	Nominated	Evicted (Day 57)			Sabrina
Allison	Not in House	In War; Room	Paul (Note: As a new HouseGuest, Allison had immunity for the week.)	Ika	Sabrina	Nominated	Kenny	No Voting	Arlie	Nominated	Evicted (Day 51)				Jon
Arlie	Anick	Kyle	Paul	Ika	Andrew	Sarah	Kenny	Nominated		Evicted (Day 50)					Jon
Kenny	Anick	Kyle	Paul	Ika	Sabrina	Allison	Nominated	Evicted (Day 43)							Jon (Note: Canada voted for who they wanted to win Big Brother Canada.)
Sarah	Anick	Kyle	Paul	Ika	Andrew	Nominated	Evicted (Day 43)								
Andrew	Anick	Head of Household	Paul	Ika	Nominated	Evicted (Day 36)									
Ika	Nominated	Kyle	Head of Household	Nominated	Evicted (Day 29)										
Paul	Head of Household	Nominated	Nominated	Evicted (Day 22)											
Kyle	Anick	Nominated	Evicted (Day 15)												
Anick	Nominated	Evicted (Day 8)													
Evicted	Anick; 11 of 11 votes to evict	Kyle; 9 of 10 votes to evict	Allison; Canada's choice to enter	Ika; 8 of 9 votes to evict	Andrew; 7 of 9 votes to evict	Sarah; 4 of 7 votes to evict	Kenny; 5 of 6 votes to evict	(None)	Arlie; 5 of 5 votes to evict	Allison; 4 of 4 votes to evict	Rachelle; 3 of 3 votes to evict	Adel; 2 of 2 votes to evict	Heather; Jon's choice to evict	Neda; Jon's choice to evict	Jon; 6 votes to win
Evicted	Anick; 11 of 11 votes to evict	Kyle; 9 of 10 votes to evict	Paul; 6 of 10 votes to evict	Ika; 8 of 9 votes to evict	Andrew; 7 of 9 votes to evict	Sarah; 4 of 7 votes to evict	Kenny; 5 of 6 votes to evict	(None)	Arlie; 5 of 5 votes to evict	Allison; 4 of 4 votes to evict	Rachelle; 3 of 3 votes to evict	Adel; 2 of 2 votes to evict	Heather; Jon's choice to evict	Neda; Jon's choice to evict	Sabrina; 1 vote to win

== Have-Not(s) ==
	Week 1	Week 2	Week 3	Week 4	Week 5	Week 6 (Note: Rachelle broke a Have-Not rule for eating regular food.As a result, all HouseGuests were put on slop and cold water for 48 hours.) (Note: Sarah used a slop pass she won in Week 4's Power of Veto competition. This, however, did not exempt her from sleeping in the Have-Not room nor from taking cold showers.)	Week 7	Week 8	Week 9	Week 10
Have-Nots	none	Heather, Neda, Rachelle, Sarah	Allison, Jon, Paul	Adel, Arlie, Heather, Sabrina	Adel, Jon	Kenny, Rachelle, Sarah	Arlie, Heather, Neda, Rachelle	none		

== Call-out order ==
Before the week's Nominations Ceremony, the Head of Household would put the keys of the HouseGuests not nominated in the Nomination Wall. At the Nomination Ceremony, the HoH will pull the first key from the wall and declare that HouseGuest as safe. The saved HouseGuest would pull the next key with the process continuing until there are no keys in the wall. The two HouseGuests who do not receive their key are nominated for eviction.

	Week 1	Week 2	Week 3	Week 4	Week 5 (Note: Because of the Canada's HoH twist, Week 5's nomination ceremony had a different format. Arisa hosted the ceremony and announced whether a HouseGuest was nominated or safe, in no particular order.)	Week 6 (Note: Owing to a double eviction, no formal nomination ceremony occurred for the second round of week 6.)		Week 7	Week 8 (Note: Owing to an instant eviction, no formal nomination ceremony occurred for the first round of week 8.)		Week 9	Week 10 (Note: No nomination ceremony was held for the final eviction, as the nominees were the losers of the Final HoH competition.)	
HOH	Paul	Andrew	Ika	Rachelle	Canada	Heather	Neda	Jon	Neda	Adel	Jon	Sabrina	Jon
1	Arlie	Sabrina	Allison (Note: As she was immune, Alison received her key first.)	Sabrina	Heather	Adel	N/A	Neda	N/A	Neda	Neda	Neda	
2	Ika	Sarah	Andrew	Neda	Arlie	Rachelle	N/A	Heather	N/A	Heather	Adel		
3	Jon	Ika	Sarah	Arlie	Kenny	Neda	N/A	Arlie	N/A	Jon			
4	Neda	Heather	Sabrina	Jon	Sarah	Jon	N/A	Allison	N/A				
5	Sarah	Adel	Kenny	Sarah	Andrew	Arlie	N/A	Adel					
6	Kyle	Arlie	Rachelle	Kenny	Neda	Sabrina	N/A						
7	Heather	Kyle	Jon	Ika	Adel	Sarah							
8	Rachelle	Rachelle	Neda	Adel	Jon								
9	Adel	Jon	Adel	Andrew	Allison								
10	Sabrina	Kenny	Arlie		Rachelle								
11	Kenny				Sabrina								
Nominated	Andrew; Anick	Paul; Neda	Paul; Heather	Heather; Allison	Andrew; Sabrina	Kenny; Allison	Rachelle; Sabrina	Rachelle; Sabrina	Allison; Sabrina	Rachelle; Sabrina	Heather; Sabrina	Heather; Jon	Neda; Sabrina

== Production ==
Following multiple adaptions of the Big Brother format in French-speaking Canada, an English version of the show premiered on Slice in 2013. The show was a ratings hit for the network, prompting a second season to be ordered soon after the finale. It was officially confirmed on 5 June. Barbra Williams with Shaw Media said "Last season, our Canadian edition of Big Brother exceeded all expectations, bringing in record audiences and engaging fans in ways we'd never done before [...] With season two chock-full of opportunities for viewers at home to influence the house and never before seen show-altering twists, our new batch of HouseGuests and fans are in for a wildly exciting ride." Like the previous season, Robyn Kass was given the task of finding the cast for the show's sophomore season. Casting officially launched on 1 August. While open casting calls were held from September to October, applicants could apply online until 25 October. Following the show's renewal, it was confirmed that Arisa Cox would return as the show's host after receiving positive feedback.

It was confirmed in February that the season would feature fifteen HouseGuests, the same number as the previous season. Fourteen of the HouseGuests were revealed on 26 February, with the fifteenth being teased as the show's first twist. Executive producer John Brunton claimed the twist was "major" and was "going to be a freakin' barnburner, people are going to be on the edge of their seats." The original fourteen HouseGuests entered the House on 27 February. It was revealed during the show's premiere that the viewers would vote between three potential HouseGuests to enter the House as the official fifteenth HouseGuest. The three potential HouseGuests – Allison, Nate, and Scott – spent one week living inside the House's secret War Room, with a live feed on them as well. While in the room, they were at times shown clips from inside the House, as well as given tasks to complete. The chosen HouseGuest entered the House following the second eviction of the season, making them the first late entrant in Big Brother Canada. The spin-off series Big Brother Canada Side Show premiered following the first live eviction. Hosted by Cox alongside former HouseGuests Gary Levy and Peter Brown, the show featured interviews with the previously evicted HouseGuest as well as former HouseGuests.

This season featured a Fan Meter, impacting the game with each new level it reached based on fan interaction. Though the HouseGuests were shown the statistics of the Fan Meter at times, they were not told what it was or what purpose it served. The Brick continued to sponsor the show through its second season, offering a $25,000 gift card to the winner. To promote the company, fans were able to select one piece of furniture from The Brick each week to place in the Head of Household suite. New sponsor Twistos played a large role in the series with the introduction of Twistos Twists, replacing last season's Power Plays. Ramada and Pizza Pizza sponsored the second season as well. Twistos offered a $10,000 trip to a location of their choice to the show's winner, alongside the prize from The Brick and the standard $100,000 prize. The runner-up received a $20,000 prize as well.

The show's second season aired on Sundays, Wednesdays, and Thursdays, the same schedule as the prior season. Episodes aired at 8 PM Central time. Big Brother: After Dark aired nightly on Slice as well, providing a live feed into the House. For the new season, a new House was built at Showline Studios in Toronto. Photos of the House's construction were shared online each Friday in the February leading up to the show. Entertainment Tonight Canada unveiled the new House on 24 February. The House, featuring a total of 85 cameras, was once more designed by Peter Faragher. The new House was two stories, with the top floor consisting of the main entrance and two bedrooms. One bedroom was the Head of Household suite, while another was the Have-Not bedroom. The main bedroom had a red and white color scheme, while the Head of Household suite featured light blue walls with elegant chandeliers hanging. The Have-Not room, located downstairs, had a low ceiling and furniture that was split in half, including the beds. The backyard continued to be inside the actual House, though an outside section featured a hot tub. The new House was 18,000 square feet. The new House featured the secret War Room, as well as the return of Marsha the Moose.

== Reception ==
Like the prior season, Big Brother Canada found ratings success with its sophomore season. The second season held an average of 0.667 million viewers throughout the ten-week run, on par with the average of season one. HouseGuest Neda Kalantar has frequently been cited as one of, if not the best, HouseGuests to play the game in Canada. She was a popular player with fans of the show throughout the season, with fans voting to give her a private meeting with former HouseGuests Jillian MacLaughlin and Emmett Blois. Fans of the series were shocked at her eviction on the show's finale, when longtime ally Jon Pardy chose to evict her over Sabrina. The show's host went on to list it as her fifth top ten moment in the show, as Neda would have won the season if she was in the final two. HouseGuest Ika Wong gained a considerable amount of fan support despite her early eviction, namely for the incident in which she shredded the HouseGuests letters from home in exchange for a cash prize. The moment was referenced in future seasons of the show, and was ranked as the best moment of the season by Cox. Both Kalantar and Wong returned to compete in the show's fifth season, though Kalantar's reputation was damaged by her performance that season. The latter went on to come in fourth place that season, and was praised for her gameplay. The second season of Big Brother Canada was listed by BuzzFeed in 2018 as the best season of Big Brother Canada, and the fourth best season of the show in North America.
