= Big Brother 1 =

Big Brother 1 or Big Brother (season 1) is the first season of various versions of Big Brother and may refer to:

- Big Brother (Albanian season 1), the 2008 Albanian edition of Big Brother
- Big Brother (Australian season 1), the 2001 Australian edition of Big Brother
- Big Brother (British series 1), the 2000 UK edition of Big Brother
- Big Brother (Croatian season 1), the 2004 Croatian edition of Big Brother
- Big Brother (Dutch season 1), the 1999 Dutch edition of Big Brother
- Big Brother (Finnish season 1), the 2005 edition of Big Brother in Finland
- Big Brother (German season 1), the 2000 German edition of Big Brother
- Big Brother (Greek season 1), the 2001 Greek edition of Big Brother
- Big Brother (Israeli season 1), the 2008 edition of Big Brother in Israel
- Big Brother (Serbian season 1), the 2006 edition of Big Brother in Serbia, Bosnia and Herzegovina, and Montenegro
- Big Brother (Slovenian season 1), the 2007 Slovenian edition of Big Brother
- Big Brother 1 (American season), the 2000 U.S. season of Big Brother
- Big Brother 1 (Bulgarian season), the 2004-2005 Bulgarian edition of Big Brother
- Big Brother 1 (Romania), the 2003 Romanian edition of Big Brother
- Big Brother 1 (Indonesia), the 2011 season of Big Brother in Indonesia
- Big Brother 1 (Ukraine), the 2011 edition of Big Brother in Ukraine
- Big Brother Africa (season 1), the 2003 African edition of Big Brother
- Big Brother Canada (season 1), the English-Canadian 2013 edition of Big Brother
- Big Brother Thailand (season 1), the 2005 Thai edition of Big Brother
- Big Brother Brasil 1, the 2002 Brazilian edition of Big Brother
- Pinoy Big Brother: Season 1, the 2005 edition of Big Brother in the Philippines

== See also ==
- Big Brother Angola: Tesouro, the 2014 Angolan edition of Big Brother
- Bigg Boss 1 (disambiguation)
  - Bigg Boss (Hindi season 1), the 2006-2007 edition of Big Brother in India
    - Bigg Boss OTT (Hindi season 1), season one of the internet version of the show
    - Bigg Boss Halla Bol, a spinoff of season 8 of the show
  - Bigg Boss (Bangla season 1), first season of Big Brother in India in Bengali
  - Bigg Boss Kannada (season 1), first season of Big Brother in India in Kannada
    - Bigg Boss OTT Kannada (season 1), internet version of the show
  - Bigg Boss (Malayalam season 1), first season of Big Brother in India in Malayalam
  - Bigg Boss Marathi (season 1), first season of Big Brother in India in Marathi
  - Bigg Boss (Tamil season 1), first season of Big Brother in India in Tamil
    - Bigg Boss Ultimate (season 1), internet version of the show
  - Bigg Boss (Telugu season 1), first season of Big Brother in India in Telugu
    - Bigg Boss Non-Stop (season 1), internet version of the show
- Gran Hermano (Argentine season 1), the first 2001 Argentinian edition of Big Brother
- Gran Hermano (Spanish season 1), the 2000 edition of Big Brother in Spain
- Grande Fratello (season 1), the 2000 edition of Big Brother in Italy
- Loft Story (Canadian TV series)#Season 1, the French-Canadian 2003 edition of Big Brother
- Secret Story (French season 1), the 2007 edition of Big Brother in France
- Secret Story 1 (French season), the 2010 edition of Big Brother in Portugal
- Velký Bratr, the 2005 Czech edition of Big Brother
