= Big Brother Canada season 10 =

Season of television series

Big Brother Canada
- Season 10
- The title card for Big Brother Canada 10
- Presented by: Arisa Cox
- No. of days: 69
- No. of houseguests: 16
- Winner: Kevin Jacobs
- Runner-up: Josh Nash
- Canada's Favourite HouseGuest: Martin "Marty" Frenette
- No. of episodes: 29

Release
- Original network: Global
- Original release: March 2 – May 5, 2022

Additional information
- Filming dates: February 26 – May 5, 2022

Season chronology
- ← Previous; Season 9 Next → Season 11

Big Brother Canada 10 is the tenth season of the Canadian reality television series Big Brother Canada. The series began filming on February 26, 2022, and premiered on March 2, 2022, on Global. Hosted by Arisa Cox, the show revolved around sixteen contestants (known as HouseGuests), who volunteered to reside in a house under constant surveillance and without any communication with the outside world as they compete to win a grand prize of CA$100,000.

The season concluded on May 5, 2022, after running for 69 days. It was won by Kevin Jacobs, who defeated Josh Nash in a final 8-1 jury vote. Meanwhile, Marty Frenette won an online vote to become this season's Canada's Favourite HouseGuest. The finale of the season was watched by 835 thousand viewers.

== Format ==
Big Brother Canada follows a group of contestants, known as HouseGuests who move into a custom-built house outfitted with cameras and microphones, recording their every move 24 hours a day. The HouseGuests are sequestered in the Big Brother Canada House with no contact with the outside world. During their stay, the HouseGuests share their thoughts on events and other HouseGuests inside a private room referred to as the Diary Room. At the start of each week in the house, the HouseGuests compete for the title of Head of Household, often shortened to simply HoH. The winner of the HoH competition is immune from eviction and will name two HouseGuests to be nominated for eviction. After the nominees are determined, the Power of Veto competition is played. Five players will compete in the competition: the two nominees and three random players, with the winner receiving the Power of Veto. If a HouseGuest chooses to exercise the Power of Veto, the Head of Household is obligated to name a replacement nominee. The holder of the Power of Veto is safe from being nominated as the replacement nominee. On eviction night, all HouseGuests must vote to evict one of the nominees, with the exception of the nominees and the Head of Household. The eviction vote is by secret ballot, with HouseGuests casting their votes orally in the Diary Room. In the event of a tied vote, the Head of Household will cast a tie-breaking vote publicly. The nominee with the majority of the votes is evicted from the house. Midway through the season, the evicted HouseGuests go on to become members of the "jury"; the jury is responsible for choosing who wins the series. The final Head of Household competition is split into three parts; the winners of the first two rounds compete in the third and final round. Once only two HouseGuests remain, the members of the jury cast their votes for who should win the series.

== HouseGuests ==
The cast of the tenth season of Big Brother Canada. From left to right: Marty, Tynesha, Kyle, Melina, Josh, Stephanie, Kevin, Betty, Moose, Jacey-Lynne, Jay, Haleena, Hermon, Summer, Gino and Jess

The HouseGuests' images and profiles were released on Wednesday, February 23, 2022. Prior to the full reveal, the images of the HouseGuests were revealed in a series of adverts for the season. The HouseGuests moved into the house on February 26, more than a week before the premiere.

Name	Age	Occupation	Residence	Result
Kevin Jacobs	28	Sales engineer	Toronto, Ontario	Winner; Day 69
Josh Nash	28	Pediatric resident	Vancouver, British Columbia	Runner-up; Day 69
Bethlehem "Betty" Yirsaw	31	Human Resources manager	Edmonton, Alberta	Evicted; Day 69
Haleena Gill	27	Master's student	Surrey, British Columbia	Evicted; Day 64
Jacey-Lynne Graham	24	Social media manager	Thunder Bay, Ontario	Evicted; Day 62
Marty Frenette	43	Fraud investigator	Petit-Rocher, New Brunswick	Evicted; Day 55
Summer Sayles	25	Unemployed (Note: According to the show, Summer's occupation at the time of the show was "Funemployed". Funemployed is a term used to describe the period of time wherein individuals enjoy the free time brought by unemployment before acquiring a new job.)	St. Catharines, Ontario	Evicted; Day 55
Steven "Gino" Giannopoulos	28	Firefighter	Laval, Quebec	Evicted; Day 55
Moose Bendago	24	Content creator	Toronto, Ontario	Evicted; Day 48
Hermon Nizghi	29	Auto sales general manager	Nanaimo, British Columbia	Evicted; Day 41
Jessica "Jess" Gowling	35	Visual artist	Cranbrook, British Columbia	Evicted; Day 34
Tynesha White	32	Model	Montreal, Quebec	Evicted; Day 34
Kyle Moore	23	Podcaster	Halifax, Nova Scotia	Evicted; Day 27
Stephanie Paterson	26	Child & youth worker	Toronto, Ontario	Evicted; Day 20
Jay Northcott	28	Theater director	Toronto, Ontario	Evicted; Day 13
Melina Mansing	29	Artist	Toronto, Ontario	Evicted; Day 6

=== Future appearances ===
Kevin Jacobs competed on the third season of The Traitors Canada.

=== Guests ===
As the show's "milestone" tenth season, an unprecedented number of HouseGuests (including all past winners) from previous seasons made an appearance on the season.

Name	Previous Season		Week	Method	Reason
Name	Season	Status	Week	Method	Reason
Jillian MacLaughlin	Big Brother Canada 1	Winner	2	Virtually	To give advice to that week's Head of Household
Jon Pardy	Big Brother Canada 2	Winner	3	Virtually	To give advice to that week's Head of Household
Sarah Hanlon	Big Brother Canada 3	Winner	4	Virtually	To give advice to that week's Head of Household
Nick Paquette	Big Brother Canada 4	Winners	5	Virtually	To give advice to that week's Head of Household
Phil Paquette	Big Brother Canada 4	Winners	5	Virtually	To give advice to that week's Head of Household
Sindy Nguyen	Big Brother Canada 3	Evicted	5	In Person	To pose for the "Legends of the Doors" HoH Competition
Sindy Nguyen	Big Brother Canada 5	Evicted	5	In Person	To pose for the "Legends of the Doors" HoH Competition
Anthony Douglas	Big Brother Canada 7	Runner-up	5	In Person	To pose for the "Legends of the Doors" HoH Competition
Godfrey Mangwiza	Big Brother Canada 3	Runner-up	5	In Person	To pose for the "Legends of the Doors" HoH Competition
Jedson Tavernier	Big Brother Canada 9	Evicted	5	In Person	To pose for the "Legends of the Doors" HoH Competition
Victoria Woghiren	Big Brother Canada 9	Evicted	5	In Person	To pose for the "Legends of the Doors" HoH Competition
Kevin Martin	Big Brother Canada 3	Evicted	6	Virtually	To give advice to that week's Head of Household
Kevin Martin	Big Brother Canada 5	Winner	6	Virtually	To give advice to that week's Head of Household
Paras Atashnak	Big Brother Canada 6	Winner	7	Virtually	To give advice to that week's Head of Household
Dane Rupert	Big Brother Canada 7	Winner	8	Virtually	To give advice to that week's Head of Household
Ika Wong	Big Brother Canada 2	Evicted	9	In Person	To host the "Shred That Letter" HoH Competition
Ika Wong	Big Brother Canada 5	Evicted	9	In Person	To host the "Shred That Letter" HoH Competition
Tychon Carter-Newman	Big Brother Canada 9	Winner	9	Virtually	To give advice to that week's Head of Household
Sabrina Abbate	Big Brother Canada 2	Runner-up	10	Virtually	To give advice to that week's Head of Household
Karen Singbeil	Big Brother Canada 5	Runner-up	10	Virtually	To give advice to that week's Head of Household
Breydon White	Big Brother Canada 9	Runner-up	10	Virtually	To give advice to that week's Head of Household

== Summary ==
Week 1
On Day 1, the sixteen new HouseGuests entered the game show themed Big Brother Canada House. As the first four to enter the House, Gino, Jacey-Lynne, Josh, and Summer opted to immediately form the "Honey Bunch" alliance. Upon the entry of all HouseGuests, the phone behind Door 5 rang. Jay answered the phone, granting them immunity for the week, but making them ineligible to compete for Head of Household. The HouseGuests then competed in the HoH competition.
- HoH Competition ("Doors of Destiny"): The HouseGuests competed in three consecutive rounds, with the winner of each round advancing to the final prize round. The HouseGuests drew chips to determine which game they were to compete in.
  - Part 1 ("Puzzle"): The HouseGuests had to race to build a puzzle inside a door frame. Upon completion, they had to step through the door and press the buzzer. Gino, Hermon, Jacey-Lynne, Summer and Tynesha were chosen to compete, with Hermon being the first to buzz.
  - Part 2 (Trivia): The HouseGuests had to answer a series of true or false questions about the House. The first person to answer correctly could eliminate any person of their choice. If they were incorrect, they were eliminated. Betty, Kevin, Marty, Moose, and Stephanie were chosen to compete, with Moose being the last HouseGuest standing.
  - Part 3 (Skill): The HouseGuests had to toss three beanbags on three rotating platforms. Haleena, Jess, Josh, Kyle, and Melina were chosen to compete, among them Josh was the first to land all five beanbags onto the platforms.

After the three winners were named, they were presented with three mystery doors, each choosing one door each. Behind two of the doors were safety for the week, while the other door held the title of Head of Household. Josh and Moose earned safety for the week, and Hermon became the first Head of Household of the season.

On Day 2, Hermon nominated Jess and Melina for eviction, with Jess as his target and Melina as the backup target. Hermon saw Jess as a threat after a private conversation, seeing them as very smart and dangerous down the line. The following day, Gino, Haleena and Jay were drawn to compete for the Power of Veto.

- PoV Competition ("Power Popper 2.0"): Based on the season 1 competition of the same name, the HouseGuests must pop a series of balloons in search of green balls. However, they can only pop balloons using the spiked belts around their waist. Once they retrieve ten green balls, they must solve their puzzle. Jess was the first to complete, making them the winner.

On Day 4, Jess elected to use the Power of Veto on themself, making Hermon name Kevin as a replacement nominee with the intent to send Melina home. On Day 6, Melina was evicted by a 11–2 vote, with Jay and Jess voting to evict Kevin. Arisa then revealed that throughout the season, the surviving nominee will earn the opportunity to open a mystery door in the House. As the surviving nominee, Kevin had the choice of opening Door 14, Door 3, or Door 19. One contained $500, another contained $2,500, and the last one contained $5,000. Kevin opened Door 19 and earned $500.

Week 2
Following Melina's eviction, the HouseGuests competed in the HoH competition.
- HoH Competition ("Surf's Up"): HouseGuests must balance their surfboard to keep a ball from falling. If their ball falls, they will be eliminated. Marty was the last HouseGuest standing, making him the winner.

Following the competition, Marty made a deal with Stephanie to keep her safe. Meanwhile, Gino, Hermon, Josh, Kyle, Moose, Summer, and Tynesha formed the "Savage 7" alliance. Summer, Betty, Tynesha, and Haleena also formed the “Mandems” alliance. Jess was a common target among the HouseGuests.

On Day 7, Marty nominated Jacey-Lynne and Jay for eviction, with the latter being the target. Haleena, Josh and Betty were drawn to compete for the Power of Veto.

- PoV Competition ("Master Baker"): HouseGuests must build one layer of their cake, ensuring all five columns are of equal height. They must then slide their cake across the assembly line and build their next layer. If their cake falls at any time, they must start over. The first HouseGuest to successfully build their cake and hit their buzzer will win the Power of Veto. Jacey-Lynne was the winner.

Marty initially wanted to nominate Kevin as a pawn to evict Jay, but Kevin convinced him to nominate Betty as the pawn instead. On Day 10, Jacey-Lynne used the Power of Veto on herself, with Betty being named by Marty as the replacement nominee. On Day 13, Jay was evicted by a 10–2 vote, with Hermon and Kyle voting to evict Betty.

Week 3
Following Jay's eviction, the HouseGuests competed in the HoH competition.
- HoH Competition ("Tough Sledding"): HouseGuests will take a running start and jump onto their sled, sliding down the lane. The further they travel down the lane, the higher their score. If a HouseGuest falls off the end of the track, they will receive a score of zero. The HouseGuest with the highest score will be the new Head of Household. Kyle was the winner.

As a member of several alliances, clear targets for Kyle were Jess and Betty, but Jess convinced Kyle not to target them and Kyle felt Betty was not worth targeting. After input from the other members of the Savage 7 alliance, Kyle convinced himself that Stephanie would be the best option to be evicted outside of Jess and Betty. Recently, Moose had been trying to play people against each other and many players had grown suspicious of him. Despite Gino, Hermon, Jacey-Lynne, Kyle, and Stephanie being in "The Retreat" alliance, Moose told Kyle that Stephanie could not be trusted. When Kyle told Stephanie, Stephanie accused Moose of playing the middle, and Moose lied to cover up the fact that he and Kyle had been working together. Due to this, Kyle lost trust with Moose and wanted to betray their "Savage 7" alliance and blew it up. Kyle also floated targeting Hermon due to his own paranoia about the Savage 7 alliance. During the disorder, Moose suggested nominating members of the Savage 7 to Kyle, and he told the rest of the Savage 7.

The HouseGuests learned that the public voted for Marty to receive the "BelAirDirect Eviction Insurance", giving him safety for the week. On Day 14, Kyle nominated Moose and Stephanie for eviction, with Moose as the target. Gino, Josh and Betty were drawn to compete for the Power of Veto.

- PoV Competition (Bees Knees 2.0): Based on the season 1 competition of the same name, the HouseGuests must complete a puzzle. After solving their puzzle, they must untie, dig, and use their stinger to find six red balls. They must maneuver the red balls, and one gold ball down their honeycomb into their proper spots. Moose was the first to properly place the balls, making him the winner.

On Day 17, Moose chose to use the Power of Veto on himself, making Kyle name his new target, Josh as his replacement nominee. Many HouseGuests considered going against Kyle's wishes for his behaviour and nominations. Most HouseGuests also felt a bond with Josh and lacked a similar connection with Stephanie as she was expendable. Late in the week Kevin falsely convinced Marty that Kyle was considering targeting Marty and that's why he was awarded safety. This caused Marty to turn on Kyle, despite formerly being a close ally of Kyle while most of Kyle's other allies had turned on him. On Day 20, Stephanie was evicted in a 9–2 vote, with Gino and Jacey-Lynne voting to evict Josh.

Week 4
Following Stephanie's eviction, the HouseGuests competed in the HoH competition.
- HoH Competition (Shopper's Showcase): The HouseGuests were asked a series of questions regarding the prices of the items displayed in the Shopper's Showcase located in the pantry. They must determine whether the actual price of an item is higher or lower than the price given by Arisa. After a tiebreaker between Betty, Gino, Moose, and Marty, Gino emerged as the winner.

Gino considered nominating Marty as his target after feeling betrayed after the last eviction vote. Meanwhile, Haleena and Kevin noticed Hermon was playing a strong game and was a threat to win and over the course of the week. As a result, Haleena began painting Hermon, Tynesha, and Moose as a dangerous trio to Jess, Marty, Kevin, Gino, and Jacey-Lynne in an effort to convince them to turn on all three of them which most bought in to as these efforts were generally successful.

On Day 21, Gino nominated Jess and Marty for eviction. Haleena, Summer, and Tynesha were drawn to compete for the Power of Veto.

- PoV Competition ("Santa's Workshop"): HouseGuests must use collect the presents rolling down the conveyor belt and use their body to press each of them against the wall. As the competition continues, their stack will get longer and more difficult to hold. In addition, decisions and temptations, such as a letter from home, milk and cookies, and different sized boxes, will come down the belt. HouseGuests can choose to add what they want to their stack. If a HouseGuest drops a box, they will be eliminated. Marty was the last HouseGuest standing, making him the winner.

Despite being Kyle his closest ally, Gino debated either betraying him to appease the rest of the HouseGuests and show that he was not tied to Kyle, or nominating Betty as the new target. Summer pushed for Kyle to be nominated and evicted, despite the move not being good for Gino. On Day 24, Marty used the Power of Veto on himself, making Gino name Kyle as the replacement nominee. On Day 27, Kyle was evicted by a unanimous vote.

Week 5
Following Kyle's eviction, the HouseGuests competed in the HoH competition.
- HoH Competition ("Legends of the Doors"): HouseGuests were asked questions about the contents of the doors unlocked for the competition. Prior to the competition, the HouseGuests were given four minutes to find the unlocked doors and study the tableaus of former HouseGuests recreating a notable moment from their past season. Each correct answer will give the HouseGuest one point. Jacey-Lynne, Josh and Jess earned the most points, with Jess winning the tiebreaker round.

In the week before, Jess, Betty, Summer, and Tynesha formed "The Siblings" alliance. On Day 28, Jess nominated Hermon and Moose for eviction, believing that the two had made it harder for them to establish themselves in the game. Jacey-Lynne, Josh and Marty were drawn to compete for the Power of Veto.

- PoV Competition ("Thrill of the Find"): HouseGuests must search for three WINNERS clothing items tagged with their name and wear them. They must then search for nine items that match the price from their display, and use their pole to place them atop their corresponding pedestals. Hermon was the first to complete the task, earning him the Power of Veto and CA$5,000 from the sponsor.

On Day 31, Hermon used the Power of Veto on himself, making Jess nominate Tynesha as a pawn in his place after Kevin convinced them that it was best for their game. While Moose had been lying low ever since his strategy was exposed during Kyle's HoH reign, Tynesha had built multiple alliances, making many HouseGuests feel she that was a strong social player and would end up being a bigger threat than Moose. Marty pushed for Jess to change the target from Moose to Tynesha, which they did. Haleena considered betraying the Mandems under the suspicion of being in the bottom of the alliance. She would ultimately betray the alliance after finding our that she was touted as a replacement nominee by the members of the alliance. Kevin worked to convince Gino and Jacey-Lynne to join the effort to flip the vote. Meanwhile, Kevin, Haleena, and Josh formed the "Crash Test Dummies" alliance, with Josh voting Moose out knowing Tynesha would go home in order to stay in good with Betty, Hermon, and Summer.

On Day 34, Tynesha was evicted in a 5–4 vote, with Betty, Hermon, Josh, and Summer voting to evict Moose.

The HouseGuests were then informed of the Chain of Safety Double Eviction. The HouseGuests would compete in two Safety competitions. The winner of the first would be safe, and select another HouseGuest to be safe for the night. Their selection would then save the next person, until three HouseGuests remained, putting them at risk for eviction. The three HouseGuests would compete in the second competition, with the winner removing themselves from the block, and the other two facing the eviction vote. Immediately, the three HouseGuests competed in the first competition.

- Safety Competition ("Warped Bowling"): Each HouseGuest rolled a bowling ball down the lane, around the obstacles, and into the scoring slots. Moose scored the highest, making him the winner.

Moose started the safety chain as the winner of the competition. He chose to save Hermon, who saved Josh followed by, Betty, Summer, Kevin, Marty and Haleena. Gino, Jacey-Lynne, and Jess were left to compete in the second competition.

- Safety Competition ("Under Pressure"): HouseGuests must search through a pile of white balls to find a series of coloured ones. They must then sort the coloured balls into their respective tubes. If they put a ball in the wrong tube, they must restart. Jacey-Lynne was the first to fill the tubes correctly, saving her from eviction, and leaving Gino and Jess to face the eviction vote.

Betty, Josh, Marty, Kevin, and Haleena decided as a group to flip and vote out Gino, noting that him staying would only be good for Hermon and Moose, who were becoming a duo. However, while observing Marty's demeanor immediately leading up to the vote, Betty thought that he had suddenly decided not to flip. Worried they would lack the votes, Betty tried to keep the group from flipping, but was only able to tell Kevin and Josh, leaving Haleena and Marty on the opposite side of the vote. At the end of the night, Jess was evicted by a 7–2 vote, with Haleena and Marty voting to evict Gino. The Jury Phase started thereafter, meaning every evictee from this point will become part of the jury that will decide the winner.

Week 6
The following day, the HouseGuests competed in the HoH competition.
- HoH Competition ("Red Light, Green Light"): When the light is green, the HouseGuests must race to toss their hoop around the pole. The last HouseGuest to land their hoop for each round will be eliminated. Should a HouseGuest toss a hoop when the light is red, they will be eliminated. Marty was the last HouseGuest standing, making him the winner.

Marty falsely believed that Betty and Josh had intentionally tricked him into voting to evict Gino during the Double Eviction. This belief was strengthened when Kevin and Haleena blamed them as well in a conversation. On Day 35, Marty nominated Betty and Josh for eviction, believing that the former could have a secret power from the phone room which could pose a risk in his plan to backdoor Josh. Gino, Kevin and Summer were drawn to compete for the Power of Veto.

- PoV Competition ("Party Casino"): HouseGuests competed in a series of party-themed games, including skeeball, a block puzzle on a tipping platform, placing balls on a balance beam, and a 3D word search. At the start of each round, the players will vote for a player to participate in a head-to-head party game, with the winner of each vote choosing their opponent. The loser for each round will be eliminated. Kevin was the last HouseGuest standing, earning him the Power of Veto.

Haleena and Kevin pushed for Marty to backdoor Hermon, commenting that he was more of a threat than Josh or Betty. On Day 38, Kevin elected to use the Power of Veto on Josh. Marty named Hermon as the replacement nominee. On Day 41 Hermon was evicted by a unanimous vote, becoming the first member of the jury. Prior to the vote, Arisa announced that the viewing public voted for their favorite moment of the season so far. The winner of the vote was Moose, awarding him with a CA$1000 gift certificate from WINNERS.

Week 7
Following Hermon's eviction, the HouseGuests competed in the HoH competition.
- HoH Competition ("Buzzkilled 3.0"): A recurring competition that first appeared in season 5, HouseGuests must wait for the buzzer to sound. Once it does, they must hit their button. Throughout the competition, Big Brother will make them offers to lure them away from their button. The last HouseGuest to ring in each round will be eliminated. Throughout the competition, Big Brother will make them offers to lure them away from their button.

As a result of a number of malfunctions observed during the competition, the competition was scrapped and replaced with a new competition.

- Replacement HoH Competition ("Before or After"): The HouseGuests had to determine if a said event took place before or after another event. Each correct answer earned them one point. In addition, during the third question, HouseGuests could forfeit the point to search for one of five "Have" cards inside the House. Should they acquire a "Have" card, they must respond to the question with the said card rather than the cards used to answer the question, thus being unable to answer the question. Acquiring a "Have" card would guarantee its holder "Have" status for the week. The HouseGuest with the most points after nine questions will be the new Head of Household. Gino earned the most votes and was crowned was the winner.

For not claiming the Have cards, Betty, Haleena, Josh, Kevin, and Moose were named the Have-Nots for the week. Gino looked to backdoor Marty in retaliation for betraying him during Kyle's HoH reign and for his vote against him in the Double Eviction. Gino informed everyone but Marty, Kevin, and Haleena about the plan. On Day 42, Gino nominated Moose and Summer for eviction, with the plan to backdoor Marty. Haleena, Jacey-Lynne, and Josh were drawn to compete for the Power of Veto.

- PoV Competition ("Sink Your Teeth"): HouseGuests must fill their water gun with water, walk across their balance beam, and shoot the gunk off of their teeth. Once they get all of the gunk off their teeth, they must solve their floating tooth puzzle. Haleena was the first to complete the puzzle, earning her the Power of Veto.

On Day 44, Jacey-Lynne found a clue to discover a secret room. After using the phone in the House and finding keys behind various doors, she discovered a secret Expedia room. Arisa then gave her a challenge to win a secret power. She had five minutes to unlock the boxes containing puzzle pieces and complete the puzzle. Jacey-Lynne accomplished her mission, earning her a Secret Power of Veto that may only be used for this week. Should she reveal the power prematurely, she would immediately be evicted.

Despite Gino initially planning to backdoor Marty, Haleena felt he was still useful for her game. Therefore, she, along with Kevin pushed for the backdoor plan to be abandoned. They cited the final five deal between them, Gino, Jacey-Lynne and Marty. Afterwards, Gino and Jacey-Lynne opted to keep Marty in the game. On Day 45, Haleena decided not to use the Power of Veto; Jacey-Lynne also decided not to use her Secret Power of Veto. On Day 48, Moose was evicted by a 6–0 vote, becoming the second member of the jury.

Week 8
Following Moose's eviction, the HouseGuests competed in the Head of Household competition.
- HoH Competition (Mount HoH): HouseGuests must hold onto a set pegs and brace themselves against the sides of their chutes. Throughout the competition, they will encounter hazards to make it more difficult. If a HouseGuest falls, they will be eliminated. Marty was the last HouseGuest standing.

After Marty was named as the Head of Household, it was announced that Summer won a public vote to receive the "BelAirDirect Eviction Insurance", granting her immunity for the week. On Day 49, Marty nominated Betty and Josh for eviction. Kevin, Summer and Gino were drawn to compete for the Power of Veto.

- PoV Competition (100 More Minutes of Hell): HouseGuests must lie in a coffin and hit their button once they believe that a hundred minutes have passed. Throughout the competition, they will face various distractions, such as filling the coffin with water, fake blood and guts, worms, and messages from their families. Betty hit their button in the closest time to 100 minutes following the start the competition, making her the winner.

On Day 51, Kevin was given a secret mission to find which of the mystery doors was unlocked to reveal a secret room. He discovered the secret Expedia room and found Marsha the Moose. Marsha then gave him a secret mission; he must convince the others he will self-evict. He passed his mission, and the HouseGuests earned a sleepover party. As Summer was safe, Marty had to nominate someone from his Final Five deal. After having them swear to evict Josh with Kevin swearing to Marty he will evict Josh on his untrue marriage, Marty had Haleena, Jacey-Lynne, and Kevin draw gummy bears to determine the replacement nominee. Marty did not want to nominate Gino due to having previously betrayed him, but allowed Gino to opt into this decision if he wanted. Gino chose to be in consideration for the replacement nominee, and when the four drew their gummy bears, Gino drew the one corresponding to nomination.

On Day 52, Betty took herself off the block, and Marty named Gino as the replacement nominee. Kevin and Haleena decided to flip on the Five, joining Betty and Summer in saving Josh, their Crash Test Dummies alliance member who they felt was more loyal to them than Gino. On Day 55, Gino was evicted in a 4–1 vote, becoming the third member of the jury, with Jacey-Lynne voting to evict Josh.

Arisa then informed the HouseGuests of the Triple Eviction, directing the HouseGuests to compete in the Head of Household competition.

- HoH Competition ("The Challenge Time Machine"): HouseGuests were asked a series of questions regarding past competitions. Each correct answer earned them one point. Josh earned the most votes, making him the winner.

Josh nominated Jacey-Lynne, Marty, and Summer for eviction. The nominations angered Summer, as Josh had previously promised her safety. Haleena's vote to evict Gino angered Jacey-Lynne, after believing that she was Haleena's closest ally. All remaining HouseGuests competed for the Power of Veto, with the exception of Josh.

- PoV Competition ("Complete the Clock"): HouseGuests must insert a ball into their clock and use their body weight to shift the balls into the empty slots of their clock. Jacey-Lynne was the first to land all of the balls, earning her the Power of Veto.

Due to his Crash Test Dummies alliance with Kevin and Haleena, Josh told Betty she would be nominated, severing their trust and blindsiding her. At the Veto Meeting, Jacey-Lynne took herself off the block, and Josh named Betty as the replacement nominee. On Day 55, Betty was saved by a unanimous vote, evicting Marty and Summer. The two became the fourth and fifth members of the jury.

Week 9
Following the events of the Triple Eviction, the HouseGuests competed in the Head of Household competition.
- HoH Competition ("Shred That Letter"): Former HouseGuest Ika Wong read a quote from various speeches throughout the season. Each correct answer earned them one point. Betty earned the most points and was named the HoH.

On Day 56, Betty nominated Jacey-Lynne and Josh for eviction. Betty felt that she couldn't trust Jacey-Lynne because she withheld the information of her winning the Secret Power of Veto. She also felt betrayed by Josh for nominating her during the Triple Eviction. Afterwards, Betty realized Kevin had been pulling strings behind the scenes and manipulating people throughout the game. She rebuilt her bond with Josh and informed him of how his ally Kevin had been manipulating him. On Day 57, the HouseGuests competed for the Power of Veto.

- PoV Competition ("Dream Vacations"): HouseGuests watched a video of each of them describing their dream vacation. They will enter the room with five unique vacation destinations. While blindfolded, they must identify which destination corresponds with each HouseGuest. Once they match each HouseGuest with their destination, they can remove their blindfold, search the scenes for puzzle pieces, and complete their puzzle. Haleena completed the task the fastest, winning her the Power of Veto, as well as a secret strategy session with season 5 Winner Kevin Martin.

On Day 59, Haleena decided not to use the Power of Veto keeping her and Kevin as the votes to evict. On Day 61, each of the HouseGuests got to spend time with their loved ones in the Phone Room for five minutes. With much indecisiveness, Haleena and Kevin debated whether to stay loyal to their Crash Test Dummies alliance with Josh or to blindside him and keep Jacey-Lynne. On Day 62, Jacey-Lynne was evicted by a 2–0 vote, becoming the sixth member of the jury.

Week 10: Finale
In the morning following Jacey-Lynne's eviction, the red countdown door went off. Inside, the HouseGuests were surprised with a Wendy's breakfast, as well as a practice station for the upcoming Head of Household competition.
- HoH Competition ("Scrambled Days"): HouseGuests were asked a series of questions regarding events of the season. They must maneuver their egg down their station and around the breakfast obstacles into a numbered slot corresponding to the day each event took place. The HouseGuest who answers the closest in each round will earn one point. Josh earned the most points after seven questions, making him the winner.

The HouseGuests were styled for the "Big Brother Canada Awards" where the HouseGuests watched several memorable moments from the season. On Day 63, Josh nominated Betty and Kevin for eviction.

- PoV Competition ("Down and Dirty"): HouseGuests must use their keys to navigate a maze to find a series questions. They must then find the HouseGuests that apply to each question, return them to the station, and buzz in. If they are correct, they will receive a key that unlocks the next section of the sewer, along with a new question. Josh correctly answered all four questions, awarding him the Power of Veto.

Josh was conflicted on whether to honor his close friendship with Betty or to stay loyal to the "Crash Test Dummies". On Day 64, Josh used the Power of Veto on Betty, and Haleena was the default replacement nominee. On Day 64, Betty cast the sole vote to evict Haleena with her and Josh feeling Haleena was the bigger jury and competition threat. She became the seventh member of the jury. Arisa then announced that Canada would become the eighth member of the jury, and they would also cast a vote for the winner.

The HouseGuests then competed in the final Head of Household competitions.

- HoH Competition Part 1 ("Epic Journey"): HouseGuests must grab two out of twenty-six silver coins and balance them on their scepter. They must then carry their scepter across the lake to their island and add two more coins to their scepter. If they drop their coins, they must start again. Kevin was the first to successfully balance all of the coins, advancing him to part 3.
- HoH Competition Part 2 ("Wall of Trivia"): Each round, the wall would present the HouseGuests with a question, along with ledges corresponding to a series of answers. They must toss beanbags on the correct answers and hit their buzzer. If they are correct, they will be presented with a new question. If they are incorrect, they must figure out where they went wrong. The wall will reset itself, regardless of the validity of their answer, every time they buzz in. Josh was the first to correctly answer all five questions, advancing him to part 3.
- HoH Competition Part 3 ("The Jury is Wild"): In this competition, HouseGuests were asked a series of questions based on members of the jury. A correct answer earned them one point. The HouseGuest with the most points after seven questions will be the final Head of Household. After a sudden-death round and a tiebreaker, Josh became the final Head of Household.

During the week Kevin had convinced Josh that Betty would beat him in the end with her underdog story while also telling Josh he would lose to him due to his lack of competition wins, so he considered betraying Betty despite being her best friend. On Day 69, Josh cast the sole vote to evict Betty, blindsiding her. She became the ninth and final member of the jury.

On Day 69, Kevin was named the winner of Big Brother Canada 10 after receiving the votes of Hermon, Moose, Gino, Summer, Marty, Jacey-Lynne, Haleena, and Canada. He won $100,000, a $10,000 "Winners" makeover, a travel package courtesy of Expedia. Josh was voted runner-up to Kevin, only receiving Betty's vote. He won $20,000. Marty was named Canada's Favourite HouseGuest and won $10,000.

== Episodes ==
No. overall	No. in season	Title	Original release date
Week 1
247	1	Episode 1	March 2, 2022
248	2	Episode 2	March 3, 2022
Week 2
249	3	Episode 3	March 7, 2022
250	4	Episode 4	March 9, 2022
251	5	Episode 5	March 10, 2022
Week 3
252	6	Episode 6	March 14, 2022
253	7	Episode 7	March 16, 2022
254	8	Episode 8	March 17, 2022
Week 4
255	9	Episode 9	March 21, 2022
256	10	Episode 10	March 23, 2022
257	11	Episode 11	March 24, 2022
Week 5
258	12	Episode 12	March 28, 2022
259	13	Episode 13	March 30, 2022
260	14	Episode 14	March 31, 2022
Week 6
261	15	Episode 15	April 4, 2022
262	16	Episode 16	April 6, 2022
263	17	Episode 17	April 7, 2022
Week 7
264	18	Episode 18	April 11, 2022
265	19	Episode 19	April 13, 2022
266	20	Episode 20	April 14, 2022
Week 8
267	21	Episode 21	April 18, 2022
268	22	Episode 22	April 20, 2022
269	23	Episode 23	April 21, 2022
Week 9
270	24	Episode 24	April 25, 2022
271	25	Episode 25	April 27, 2022
272	26	Episode 26	April 28, 2022
Week 10
273	27	Episode 27	May 2, 2022
274	28	Episode 28	May 4, 2022
275	29	Episode 29	May 5, 2022

== Voting history ==
Colour key:

Winner
Runner-up
Head of Household
Nominated for eviction
Immune from eviction
Won immunity via competition
Votes to Save
Evicted

Summary of the HouseGuests' votes and nominations
	Week 1	Week 2	Week 3	Week 4	Week 5		Week 6	Week 7	Week 8		Week 9	Week 10		
	Week 1	Week 2	Week 3	Week 4	Day 28	Day 34 (Note: This week featured a Chain of Safety Double Eviction. At the Chain of Safety Ceremony, the Housemates participated in a selection process to determine the nominees. As Moose won the first competition, he started the chain.)	Week 6	Week 7	Day 49	Day 55 (Note: This week was a triple eviction week. Following the regular eviction, the remaining HouseGuests played a modified week's worth of games, including HoH and Veto competitions and their respective ceremonies during the remainder of the live show. The Head of Household was obliged to nominate three HouseGuests for eviction. Additionally, the voting HouseGuests would vote to save rather than to evict, with the HouseGuest with the most votes to save being the sole nominee surviving the vote for that cycle.)	Week 9	Day 63	Day 69	Finale
Head of Household	Hermon	Marty	Kyle	Gino	Jess	Moose	Marty	Gino	Marty	Josh	Betty	Josh	Josh	(None)
Nominations (pre-veto)	Jess; Melina	Jacey-Lynne; Jay	Moose; Stephanie	Jess; Marty	Hermon; Moose	Gino; Jacey-Lynne; Jess	Betty; Josh	Moose; Summer	Betty; Josh	Jacey-Lynne; Marty; Summer	Jacey-Lynne; Josh	Betty; Kevin	Betty; Kevin	(None)
Veto Winner(s)	Jess	Jacey-Lynne	Moose	Marty	Hermon	Jacey-Lynne	Kevin	Haleena; Jacey-Lynne (Note: This HouseGuest found the Secret PoV.)	Betty	Jacey-Lynne	Haleena	Josh	(None)	(None)
Nominations (post-veto)	Kevin; Melina	Betty; Jay	Josh; Stephanie	Jess; Kyle	Moose; Tynesha	Gino; Jess	Betty; Hermon	Moose; Summer	Gino; Josh	Betty; Marty; Summer	Jacey-Lynne; Josh	Haleena; Kevin	(None)	(None)
Kevin	Nominated	Jay	Stephanie	Kyle	Tynesha	Jess	Hermon	Moose	Gino	Betty	Jacey-Lynne	Nominated	Nominated	Winner (Day 69)
Josh	Melina (Note: Hermon, Moose, and Josh each earned the chance to win HOH through a random choice of 3 doors. Hermon won HoH, while Moose and Josh each won immunity for the week.)	Jay	Nominated	Kyle	Moose	Jess	Hermon	Moose	Nominated	Head of Household	Nominated	Head of Household	Betty (Note: As Head of Household, Josh chose to evict Betty.)	Runner-up (Day 69)
Betty	Melina	Nominated	Stephanie	Kyle	Moose	Jess	Nominated	Moose	Gino	Nominated	Head of Household	Haleena	Evicted (Day 69)	Josh
Haleena	Melina	Jay	Stephanie	Kyle	Tynesha	Gino	Hermon	Moose	Gino	Betty	Jacey-Lynne	Nominated	Evicted (Day 64)	Kevin
Jacey-Lynne	Melina	Jay	Josh	Kyle	Tynesha	Jess (Note: This HouseGuest won a competition and was saved from possible eviction.)	Hermon	Moose	Josh	Betty	Nominated	Evicted (Day 62)		Kevin
Marty	Melina	Head of Household	Stephanie (Note: Canada voted for this Houseguest to receive immunity this week.)	Kyle	Tynesha	Gino	Head of Household	Moose	Head of Household	Nominated	Evicted (Day 55)			Kevin
Summer	Melina	Jay	Stephanie	Kyle	Moose	Jess	Hermon	Nominated	Gino	Nominated	Evicted (Day 55)			Kevin
Gino	Melina	Jay	Josh	Head of Household	Tynesha	Nominated	Hermon	Head of Household	Nominated	Evicted (Day 55)				Kevin
Moose	Melina	Jay	Stephanie	Kyle	Nominated	Jess	Hermon	Nominated	Evicted (Day 48)					Kevin
Hermon	Head of Household	Betty	Stephanie	Kyle	Moose	Jess	Nominated	Evicted (Day 41)						Kevin
Jess	Kevin	Jay	Stephanie	Nominated	Head of Household	Nominated	Evicted (Day 34)							Kevin (Note: Canada voted for who they wanted to win Big Brother Canada.)
Tynesha	Melina	Jay	Stephanie	Kyle	Nominated	Evicted (Day 34)								
Kyle	Melina	Betty	Head of Household	Nominated	Evicted (Day 27)									
Stephanie	Melina	Jay	Nominated	Evicted (Day 20)										
Jay	Kevin (Note: Jay answered Big Brother's Phone, awarding them immunity for the week.)	Nominated	Evicted (Day 13)											
Melina	Nominated	Evicted (Day 6)												
Evicted	Melina; 11 of 13 votes to evict	Jay; 10 of 12 votes to evict	Stephanie; 9 of 11 votes to evict	Kyle; 10 of 10 votes to evict	Tynesha; 5 of 9 votes to evict	Jess; 7 of 9 votes to evict	Hermon; 7 of 7 votes to evict	Moose; 6 of 6 votes to evict	Gino; 4 of 5 votes to evict	Marty; 0 of 3 votes to save	Jacey-Lynne; 2 of 2 votes to evict	Haleena; Betty's choice to evict	Betty; Josh's choice to evict	Kevin; 8 votes to win
Evicted	Melina; 11 of 13 votes to evict	Jay; 10 of 12 votes to evict	Stephanie; 9 of 11 votes to evict	Kyle; 10 of 10 votes to evict	Tynesha; 5 of 9 votes to evict	Jess; 7 of 9 votes to evict	Hermon; 7 of 7 votes to evict	Moose; 6 of 6 votes to evict	Gino; 4 of 5 votes to evict	Summer; 0 of 3 votes to save	Jacey-Lynne; 2 of 2 votes to evict	Haleena; Betty's choice to evict	Betty; Josh's choice to evict	Josh; 1 vote to win

== Have-Nots ==
Occasionally, a group of HouseGuests are selected to be Have-Nots for a certain week. Those selected to be a Have-Not would be restricted to a slop diet and cold showers. There was no official Have-Not room for this season. There were no official Have-Nots for the entire pre-jury phase of the season. Although the entire house was put on slop for weeks 4 and 5, no official Have-Nots were named. In week 7, those who failed to obtain a "Have" card in the HoH competition were automatically made Have-nots, with the exception of Gino, who was granted "have" rights by virtue of being the HoH.

Summary of HouseGuests who became Have-Nots each week.
	Week 1	Week 2	Week 3	Week 4	Week 5	Week 6	Week 7	Week 8	Week 9	Week 10
Have-Nots	none						Betty, Haleena, Kevin, Moose	none		

== Production ==
=== Development ===
The tenth season was produced by Insight Productions, in association with Corus Entertainment and Banijay. The season was first announced on July 6, 2021, at the Corus upfronts for the 2021–22 Canadian network television schedule. Arisa Cox continued as the host and as an executive producer for this season. Casting began on July 14, 2021, with Kassting Inc. returning to cast for the season. Due to restrictions stemming from the COVID-19 pandemic, no in-person casting calls were held. Casting closed on November 19, 2021, with the final cast being revealed on February 23, 2022.

Expedia, Wendy's and Muskoka Spirits returned to sponsor the season. Additionally, the show has three new sponsors: Winners, Belairdirect insurance and Philips Sonicare Oral Care.

=== Twists ===
==== Phone Room ====
Room 5 features a gold phone that rang occasionally throughout the season.

- On Day 1, Jay was the first to answer the phone and as a result they received immunity for the week.
- On Day 26, the number to the phone was "leaked" and was subject to calls that would challenge the HouseGuests to complete various tasks. As a reward for answering the calls, the HouseGuests received a stocked pantry and the Household was relieved of their slop punishment.
- On Day 44, Jacey-Lynne found a clue to call a number through the phone, leading her on a hunt throughout the House, and ultimately finding a Secret Power of Veto.

==== Belairdirect Eviction Protection Insurance ====
Occasionally throughout the season, Immunity would be awarded to HouseGuest by various means. This immunity was sponsored by BelAirDirect

- On Day 1, in the Final Round of the First HoH competition, 2 of the 3 doors would award the door's holder immunity (the third had the HoH title). Moose and Josh each won immunity for the week.
- On Day 13, it was announced that the viewers would be voting to decide which HouseGuest would receive immunity from nominations for Week 3. The voter may vote for multiple HouseGuests with no vote limits being imposed. Marty received the most votes and received the immunity.
- On Day 48, it was announced that the viewers would be voting to decide which HouseGuest would receive immunity from nominations for Week 8. The voter may vote for multiple HouseGuests with no vote limits being imposed. As a result of winning the last Belairdirect Eviction Protection Insurance, Marty was ineligible to be voted for the immunity. Summer received the most votes and was made immune.

==== Chain of Safety Double Eviction ====
Week 5 featured a Double Eviction, in which two HouseGuests were evicted on the same night. Unlike a typical Double Eviction (in which the regular game format is played over the course of the night), the second game cycle was determined by a "Chain of Safety" selection process. Beginning with Moose, who won that night's first challenge, each HouseGuest would select another HouseGuest to save until three are left unselected, who would then compete for safety in a second challenge to determine that night's second set of nominees.

Below is the full selection order for the safety chain selection.

	Safety Chain
1st Challenge	Moose
1	Hermon
2	Josh
3	Betty
4	Summer
5	Kevin
6	Marty
7	Haleena
2nd Challenge	Jacey-Lynne
Nominated	Gino; Jess

==== Canada's Jury Vote ====
In the penultimate episode for the season, it was announced that Canada would join the jury as its ninth and final member. This is the third time Canada voted as part of the jury, previously voting in Big Brother Canada 2 and Big Brother Canada 4. The recipient of the vote was determined by an online vote held prior to the finale which was exclusive to Canadian residents unlike in previous online votes. Arisa would cast the vote on Canada's behalf, and it was revealed to be cast for Kevin.

=== Prizes ===
The winner of the series, determined by the previously evicted HouseGuests, wins CA$100,000 in cash along with CA$10,000 in clothing from Winners, and a Holiday from Expedia while the runner-up receives CA$20,000. The HouseGuest selected as Canada's Favourite HouseGuest receives $10,000. Several other prizes were given out throughout the season.

=== Production design ===
Taken from the ground level of the house, the game show theme in the house can be seen from the game show wheel that serves as the living room's centerpiece.

On February 22, 2022, Global released images of the new kitchen, dining area and a then-unknown room which featured a gold phone. More images of the house were released on March 1, 2022, with a full house tour being released the following day.

In the house tour, it was revealed this season's house was built to simulate the theme of game shows and to give way for twists and tasks as seen in the numerous mystery doors that line the house. According to host Arisa Cox, it took 22,000 man hours to design and assemble the season's house.

The lounge area features a wheel used to select players for the PoV competition, with the archway to the backyard displaying an eye with a dollar symbol ($) on its pupil. The house's pantry features a showcase of several items called the "Sloppers Showcase", which was used as the subject for the Week 4 HoH competition. The pantry also houses a Wendy's delivery window, in which the HoH receives advice from past winners, along with their a for themselves, and a HouseGuest of their choice. The HoH room features designs inspired by the trends of the 70s with the two regular bedrooms being decorated with dollar symbols and question marks (?).

=== International broadcast ===
Big Brother Canada was made available to stream in Australia on 7Plus. The first 8 episodes were made available on March 31, with further episodes airing weekly.

== Reception ==
=== Critical reception ===
The season was generally well received by critics and viewers, with many praising the cast and the gameplay of the eventual winner Kevin Jacobs. Justin Carrerio of The Young Folks praised the season, commenting that Big Brother Canada 10 delivered an exciting and fun season that kept us on our toes, and its finale ended the season on a high. In a review published prior to the season finale, Lee Whitten of ScreenRant commented that the season has been near-perfect.

=== Viewing figures ===
No.	Episode	Air Date	Timeslot (ET)	Viewers (AMA (Note: Average minute audience (AMA) is the average number of individuals or (homes or target group) viewing a TV channel, which is calculated per minute during a specified period of time over the program duration.) in millions)	Rank (week)	Refs.
1	"Episode 1"	Wednesday, March 2, 2022	8:00 p.m.	1.015	24	
2	"Episode 2"	Thursday, March 3, 2022	7:00 p.m.	<0.963	—N/a	
3	"Episode 3"	Monday, March 7, 2022	7:00 p.m.	<0.943	—N/a	
4	"Episode 4"	Wednesday, March 9, 2022	8:00 p.m.	<0.943	—N/a	
5	"Episode 5"	Thursday, March 10, 2022	7:00 p.m.	<0.943	—N/a	
6	"Episode 6"	Monday, March 14, 2022	7:00 p.m.	0.913	21	
7	"Episode 7"	Wednesday, March 16, 2022	7:00 p.m.	0.941	17	
8	"Episode 8"	Thursday, March 17, 2022	8:00 p.m.	0.855	27	
9	"Episode 9"	Monday, March 21, 2022	7:00 p.m.	0.878	26	
10	"Episode 10"	Wednesday, March 23, 2022	7:00 p.m.	<0.796	—N/a	
11	"Episode 11"	Thursday, March 24, 2022	8:00 p.m.	0.873	27	
12	"Episode 12"	Monday, March 28, 2022	7:00 p.m.	<0.887	—N/a	
13	"Episode 13"	Wednesday, March 30, 2022	7:00 p.m.	0.914	28	
14	"Episode 14"	Thursday, March 31, 2022	8:00 p.m.	<0.887	—N/a	
15	"Episode 15"	Monday, April 4, 2022	7:00 p.m.	0.848	27	
16	"Episode 16"	Wednesday, April 6, 2022	7:00 p.m.	0.889	26	
17	"Episode 17"	Thursday, April 7, 2022	8:00 p.m.	<0.821	—N/a	
18	"Episode 18"	Monday, April 11, 2022	7:00 p.m.	0.920	22	
19	"Episode 19"	Wednesday, April 13, 2022	7:00 p.m.	0.880	25	
20	"Episode 20"	Thursday, April 14, 2022	8:00 p.m.	0.881	24	
21	"Episode 21"	Monday, April 18, 2022	7:00 p.m.	0.879	26	
22	"Episode 22"	Wednesday, April 20, 2022	7:00 p.m.	0.874	28	
23	"Episode 23"	Thursday, April 21, 2022	8:00 p.m.	0.875	27	
24	"Episode 24"	Monday, April 25, 2022	7:00 p.m.	0.833	29	
25	"Episode 25"	Wednesday, April 27, 2022	7:00 p.m.	<0.825	—N/a	
26	"Episode 26"	Thursday, April 28, 2022	8:00 p.m.	0.877	23	
27	"Episode 27"	Monday, May 2, 2022	7:00 p.m.	<0.782	—N/a	
28	"Episode 28"	Wednesday, May 4, 2022	7:00 p.m.	<0.782	—N/a	
29	"Episode 29"	Thursday, May 5, 2022	8:00 p.m.	0.835	25	
