= BB3 (disambiguation) =

BB3 may refer to:

- Bhool Bhulaiyaa 3, an Indian horror comedy film directed by Anees Bazmee
- BB3, working title for the 2021 Indian film Akhanda, directed by Boyapati Srinu and starring Nandamuri Balakrishna
- BB3, a postcode district the BB postcode area
- Bombesin-like receptor 3, also known as BB_{3}
- Big Brother 3 (disambiguation), a television programme in various versions
  - Bigg Boss 3 (disambiguation), Indian versions of the TV franchise
