= BB1 =

BB1 may refer to:

- BB1, a postcode district in the BB postcode area
- USS Indiana (BB-1), a United States battleship which served from 1895 until 1919
- Budd BB-1 Pioneer, an experimental flying boat produced by the Budd Company in the 1930s
- Peugeot BB1, an electric concept car introduced at Frankfurt Motor Show in 2009
- BB-1, the prototype name of the Soviet World War II light bomber, the Sukhoi Su-2
- Neuromedin B receptor or BB1, a bombesin receptor, previously known as Neuromedin B receptor (NMBR)
- Big Brother 1 (disambiguation), a television programme in various versions
  - Bigg Boss 1 (disambiguation), Indian versions of the TV franchise
- Baahubali: The Beginning, a 2015 Indian film directed by S.S. Rajamouli
- Bhool Bhulaiyaa, a 2007 Indian horror comedy film directed by Priyadarshan, first in Bhool Bhulaiyaa film series
