= Big Brother 2011 =

Big Brother 2011 may refer to:

- Big Brother 2011 (Finland)
- Big Brother 2011 (Indonesia)
- Big Brother 2011 (Sweden)
- Big Brother 12 (UK)
  - Celebrity Big Brother 8 (UK)
- Big Brother 13 (U.S.)
- Bigg Boss (Season 4), the 2010-2011 edition of Big Brother in India in Hindi
