= BB2 =

BB2 may refer to:

- BB2, a postcode district in the BB postcode area
- Gastrin-releasing peptide receptor (GRPR), also known as BB_{2}
- USS Massachusetts (BB-2), a United States battleship from 1896 to 1919
- Big Brother 2, a television programme in various versions
  - Bigg Boss 2 (disambiguation), Indian versions of the TV franchise
- Bad Boys II, a 2003 action comedy movie starring Martin Lawrence and Will Smith
- Baahubali 2: The Conclusion, an Indian film directed by S. S. Rajamouli
- Bhool Bhulaiyaa 2, a 2022 Indian horror comedy film directed by Anees Bazmee
