= BB4 =

BB4 may refer to:

- BB4, a postcode district in the BB postcode area
- Big Brother 4, a television programme in various versions
  - Bigg Boss 4 (disambiguation), Indian versions of the TV franchise
- Bb4, the B♭ (musical note) a minor 7th above middle C
