= Bigg Boss 3 =

Bigg Boss 3 is the third season of various versions of Bigg Boss (an Indian adaptation of the reality game show Big Brother):

- Bigg Boss (Hindi season 3)
  - Bigg Boss OTT (Hindi season 3)
- Bigg Boss Kannada (season 3)
- Bigg Boss (Tamil season 3)
- Bigg Boss (Telugu season 3)
- Bigg Boss (Malayalam season 3)
- Bigg Boss Marathi (season 3)

== See also ==
- Big Brother 3 (disambiguation)
- Bigg Boss (disambiguation)
- Bigg Boss 2 (disambiguation)
- Bigg Boss 4 (disambiguation)
- BB3 (disambiguation)
