= Bigg Boss 4 =

Bigg Boss 4 is the fourth season of various versions of Bigg Boss (an Indian adaptation of the reality game show Big Brother):

- Bigg Boss (Hindi season 4)
- Bigg Boss Kannada (season 4)
- Bigg Boss (Tamil season 4)
- Bigg Boss (Telugu season 4)
- Bigg Boss (Malayalam season 4)
- Bigg Boss Marathi (season 4)

== See also ==
- Big Brother 4 (disambiguation)
- Bigg Boss (disambiguation)
- Bigg Boss 3 (disambiguation)
- Bigg Boss 5 (disambiguation)
- BB4 (disambiguation)
