= Big Brother Thailand =

- Big Brother Thailand season 2 logo
- Genre: Reality competition
- Based on: Big Brother by John de Mol Jr.
- Presented by: Sarunyoo Wongkrachang; Nana Raibeena
- Country of origin: Thailand
- No. of seasons: 2

Original release
- Network: iTV; Kantana (live)
- Release: 6 April 2005 – 21 May 2006

Big Brother Thailand is the Thai version of the Big Brother reality television show based on the Dutch television series of the same name originally created by John de Mol Jr. in 1997. The show was broadcast on iTV and TrueVisions channel 20.

Thai TV station iTV has purchased the rights to broadcast Big Brother. First aired on 2 April 2005, by Kantana Group Ltd. (PCL) and Saranyu Vonkarjun host the broadcast of the NBC TV in real-time, 24 hours and highlights.

The show follows a group of Housemates living together 24 hours a day in the "Big Brother" house, isolated from the outside world but under constant surveillance with no privacy for three months. In two seasons of the show, twenty-seven different people have entered the Big Brother house. The TV cameras filming the production team of 26 to 200 people in the store 12 participants at Kantana Movie Town. The concept of being constantly watched for 100 days of the competition. Each person will need to bring clothes and personal items into the house, Big Brother as well as to co-exist with the 12 people who had never known before in the house is enclosed by high walls and cut off from the outside world completely.

== Format ==
Big Brother is a unique voice, that gives a daily mission to participants in the house as well as enforces the house rules. Participants are called housemates. Some of the missions are carried out collectively, in groups or individually. By giving housemates missions, Big Brother creates an atmosphere of competition among them where they can express their natural emotions. For each mission assigned to them, there are various conditions that must be met. If they are successful, they would be rewarded. But if they fail, they would be punished.

In addition to their daily missions, contestants take part in a daily diary session where they express their thoughts and feelings about other housemates and issues in the house to Big Brother.

Every week, each housemate must "nominate" two other housemates who they want to leave the house. Housemates with the highest nominations are put up for eviction. But they can be saved by votes from viewers. Viewers across the country vote via SMS for their favourite housemate who is up for eviction for a period of one week. Housemates with the lowest number of votes are evicted at the end of the week.

The number of housemates reduces every week until the last week where the final three housemates would be voted by viewers across the country to determine the winner. On the final day of the competition, the housemate with the highest number of votes from viewers across the country will be announced as the winner and receive a prize worth more than $1 million in the form of a house and car.

== Series overview ==
Season	Premiere date	Finale date	Housemates	Days	Winner	Hosts
1	6 April 2005	16 July 2005	12	106	Nipon Perktim (Tui)	Sarunyoo Wongkrachang; Nana Raibeena
2	4 February 2006	31 July 2006	15	178	Arisa Sonthirod (Tik)	Sarunyoo Wongkrachang; Nana Raibeena

== Trivia ==
- Total number of days on air: 213 days
- Total count of housemates: 27 Housemates
- Total count of housemates that walked: 1 Housemates
- Total count of housemates that Forced Eviction: 3 Housemates
