= Bigg Boss 2 =

Bigg Boss 2 is the second season of various versions of Bigg Boss (an Indian adaptation of the reality game show Big Brother):

- Bigg Boss (Bangla) season 2
- Bigg Boss (Hindi TV series) season 2
  - Bigg Boss OTT (Hindi season 2), the second season of its internet version
- Bigg Boss Kannada season 2
- Bigg Boss (Malayalam TV series) season 2
- Bigg Boss Marathi season 2
- Bigg Boss (Tamil TV series) season 2
- Bigg Boss (Telugu TV series) season 2

== See also ==
- Big Brother 2 (disambiguation)
- Bigg Boss (disambiguation)
- Bigg Boss 1 (disambiguation)
- Bigg Boss 3 (disambiguation)
- BB2 (disambiguation)
