= Big Boss Man (disambiguation) =

The Big Boss Man (1963–2004) was a professional wrestler.

Big Boss Man may also refer to:

- Big Boss Man (band), a British jazz/funk band
- "Big Boss Man" (song), a blues song made famous by Jimmy Reed
- Big Boss Man (Jimmy Reed album), 1968
- Big Boss Man (The Kentucky Headhunters album), 2005

== See also ==
- Bossman (disambiguation)
- Big Boss (disambiguation)
