= Bigg Boss (disambiguation) =

Bigg Boss is an Indian reality TV franchise based on Big Brother.

It may specifically refer to these Indian language versions:

- Bigg Boss Bangla, in Bengali
- Bigg Boss (Hindi TV series)
  - Bigg Boss Halla Bol, a spinoff of the Hindi version
  - Bigg Boss OTT (Hindi), an internet version of the Indian show in Hindi
- Bigg Boss Kannada
  - Bigg Boss OTT (Kannada), an internet version of the Indian show in Kannada
- Bigg Boss (Malayalam TV series)
  - Bigg Boss Agnipareeksha, a pre-show spin-off of the Indian show in Malayalam
- Bigg Boss Marathi
- Bigg Boss (Tamil TV series)
  - BB Jodigal or Bigg Boss Jodigal, an Indian dance show spinoff in Tamil
  - Bigg Boss Ultimate, an internet version of the Indian show in Tamil
  - Bigg Boss – The Common Man, a pre-show spin-off of the Indian show in Tamil
- Bigg Boss (Telugu TV series)
  - Bigg Boss Non-Stop, an internet version of the Indian show in Telugu
  - BB Jodi or Bigg Boss Jodi, an Indian dance show spinoff in Telugu
  - Bigg Boss Agnipariksha, a pre-show spin-off of the Indian show in Telugu

== See also ==
- Big Boss (disambiguation)
- Bigg Boss 1 (disambiguation)
- Bigg Boss 2 (disambiguation)
- Bigg Boss 3 (disambiguation)
- Bigg Boss 4 (disambiguation)
- Bigg Boss 5 (disambiguation)
- Bigg Boss 6 (disambiguation)
- Bigg Boss 7 (disambiguation)
- Bigg Boss 8 (disambiguation)
- Bigg Boss 9 (disambiguation)
- Bigg Boss 10 (disambiguation)
- Bigg Boss 11 (disambiguation)
- Bigg Boss 12 (disambiguation)
