= Big Brother 2 =

Big Brother 2 is the second season of various versions of Big Brother and may refer to:

- Big Brother 2 (Netherlands), the 2000 edition of the Dutch version of Big Brother
- Big Brother Germany (season 2), the 2000 version of the German edition of Big Brother
- Gran Hermano Argentina (season 2), the 2001 edition of the Argentinian version of Big Brother
- Grande Fratello (season 2), the 2001 edition of the Italian version of Big Brother
- Gran Hermano Spain (season 2), the 2001 edition of the Spanish version of Big Brother
- Big Brother 2 (UK), the 2001 edition of the UK version of Big Brother
- Big Brother 2 (U.S.), the 2001 edition of the U.S. version of Big Brother
- Big Brother 2 (Australia), the 2002 Australian edition of Big Brother
- Big Brother Brasil 2, the 2002 edition of the Brazilian version of Big Brother
- Big Brother 2 (Greece), the 2002 Greek edition of Big Brother
- Big Brother 2 (Romania), the 2004 edition of the Romanian of Big Brother
- Big Brother 2 (Bulgaria), the 2005 Bulgarian edition of Big Brother
- Big Brother 2 (Croatia), the 2005 Croatian edition of Big Brother
- Big Brother 2006 (Finland), the 2006 edition of the Finnish edition of Big Brother
- Loft Story (Canada season 2), the 2006 of the French-Canadian version of Big Brother
- Big Brother Thailand (season 2), the 2006 edition of the Thai version Big Brother
- Big Brother Africa (season 2), the 2007 edition of the African version of Big Brother
- Pinoy Big Brother (season 2), the 2007 edition of Big Brother in the Philippines
- Veliki brat 2007, the 2007 edition of Big Brother in Serbia, Bosnia and Herzegovina, and Montenegro
- Secret Story 2 (France), the 2008 edition of the French version of Big Brother
- Bigg Boss 2 (disambiguation)
  - Bigg Boss (season 2), the 2008 edition of the Indian version of Big Brother in Hindi
    - Bigg Boss OTT (Hindi season 2), the second season of its internet version
  - Bigg Boss (Bangla season 2), second season of Big Brother in India in Bengali
  - Bigg Boss Kannada (season 2), second season of Big Brother in India in Kannada
  - Bigg Boss (Malayalam season 2), second season of Big Brother in India in Malayalam
  - Bigg Boss Marathi (season 2), second season of Big Brother in India in Marathi
  - Bigg Boss (Tamil season 2), second season of Big Brother in India in Tamil
  - Bigg Boss (Telugu season 2), second season of Big Brother in India in Telugu
- Big Brother 2 (Slovenia), the 2008 edition of the Slovenian version Big Brother
- Big Brother 2 (Albania), the 2009 edition of the Albanian version of Big Brother
- HaAh HaGadol 2, the 2009–2010 edition of the Israeli version of Big Brother
- Secret Story 2 (Portugal), the 2011 edition of Big Brother in Portugal
- Big Brother 2 (Canada), the English-Canadian 2014 edition of Big Brother

== See also ==
- Big Brother (franchise)
- Big Brother (disambiguation)
