= Big Boss =

Big Boss or The Big Boss may refer to:

== Films ==
- The Big Boss (1921 film), a German silent crime film
- The Big Boss (1941 film), a crime drama film with Gloria Dickson
- The Big Boss, a 1971 Hong Kong martial arts-action film starring Bruce Lee
- Big Boss (film), a 1995 Telugu film directed by Vijaya Bapineedu

== Other uses ==
- Big Boss (Metal Gear), a central character from the Metal Gear video game series by Konami
- Big Boss (musician), Czech metal singer
- Big Boss (C.O.P.S.), from the C.O.P.S. (Central Organization of Police Specialists) toyline by Hasbro
- Tsuyoshi Shinjo, Japanese baseball manager also known as BIGBOSS
- Big Boss, a fictional villain in the 2013 Indian film Boss, played by Danny Denzongpa
- Big Boss, a fictional villain in the 2014 film Rio 2

== See also ==
- Big Boss Band, 1990 studio album of George Benson
- Big Boss Man (disambiguation)
- Big Brother (disambiguation)
- Bigg Boss (disambiguation)
- Boss (video games)
