= Bossman =

Bossman or Boss Man may refer to:

== Music ==
- Boss Man (album), a 2020 album by American rapper Rich the Kid
- "Bossman" (song), by Beenie Man
- "Bossman", a song by Nancy Sinatra from Nancy Sinatra
- "Bossman", a song by rapper Soulja Slim from The Streets Made Me

== People ==
- Bossman (rapper) (born 1984), American rapper
- BossMan Dlow (born 1998), American rapper
- Bossman, a fictional member of the Amoeba Boys, a group of characters in the animated series The Powerpuff Girls

=== People with the surname ===
- Francis Bossman (born 1984), Ghanaian footballer
- Kelvin Bossman (born 1991), Ghanaian footballer
- Peter Bossman (born 1955), Ghanaian-Slovenian doctor and politician

== See also ==
- Big Boss Man (disambiguation)
