= Bigg Boss 1 =

Bigg Boss 1 is the first season of various versions of Bigg Boss (an Indian adaptation of the reality game show Big Brother):

- Bigg Boss (Bangla season 1)
- Bigg Boss (Hindi season 1)
  - Bigg Boss OTT (Hindi season 1), season one of the internet version of the show
  - Bigg Boss Halla Bol, a spinoff of season 8 of the show
- Bigg Boss Kannada (season 1)
  - Bigg Boss OTT Kannada (season 1)
  - Bigg Boss Mini Season, a spinoff of season 8 of the show
- Bigg Boss (Malayalam season 1)
- Bigg Boss Marathi (season 1)
- Bigg Boss (Tamil season 1)
  - Bigg Boss Ultimate (season 1), internet version of the show
- Bigg Boss (Telugu season 1)
  - Bigg Boss Non-Stop (season 1), internet version of the show

== See also ==
- Big Brother 1 (disambiguation)
- Bigg Boss (disambiguation)
- Bigg Boss 2 (disambiguation)
- BB1 (disambiguation)
