= Big Brother Thailand season 1 =

Big Brother Thailand
- Season 1
- Presented by: Sarunyoo Wongkrachang
- No. of days: 106
- No. of housemates: 12
- Winner: Nipon Perktim (Tui)
- Runner-up: Sophon Srisaku (Heaw)

Release
- Original network: iTV
- Original release: 6 April – 16 July 2005

Season chronology
- Next → Season 2

Big Brother Thailand 1 was the first season of the Thailand reality television series Big Brother Thailand and aired on iTV's primetime block. The season started on 6 April 2005 and ended on 16 July 2005, lasting 106 days. It was the most talk-about season of Big Brother Thailand.

== Housemates ==
Twelve housemates entered the house together on the first night. Each week, except for the first week, one of them would be evicted by the public vote. Due to Yinmy's ejection from the house on Week 11, Pim returned to the house to replace her. On the final night, the public voted for the housemate(s) they wanted to win, and Nipon Perktim (Tui) was the winner.

Name		Age on entry	Hometown	Day entered	Day exited	Result
Tui	Nippon Perktim	—	Samut Songkhram	1	106	Winner
Heaw	Sophon Srisaku	—	—	1	106	Runner-up
Pim	Pimjak Chiwarak	23	Lampang	75	106	3rd Place
Pim	Pimjak Chiwarak	23	Lampang	1	57	Evicted
Muay	Ratfah Deangpiboolsakul	—	—	1	99	Evicted
Por	Pramook Jareeprasit	—	—	1	92	Evicted
Num	Udorn Phetsihng	—	Samut Prakan	1	85	Evicted
Pom	Chatchai Photipana	25	Phrae	1	78	Evicted
Peaky	Warissara Buskeaw	26	Surin	1	71	Evicted
Yinmy	Napatnaphet Thitiwongsaroj	24	Sisaket	1	65	Ejected
Toto	Puwadol Jinsiri	23	Phuket	1	43	Evicted
Nara	Pimchanok Nara Du be	33	Bangkok	1	29	Evicted
Aom-Am	Montriya Wichainsan	27	Nakhon Pathom	1	15	Evicted

=== Aom-Am (อ๋อมแอ๋ม) ===
- Montriya Wichainsan is a 27 years old student from Nakhon Pathom She is the first housemate of the season to be evicted, on Day 15 with 3.77% to save.

=== Heaw (แห้ว) ===
- Sophon Srisaku was the runner-up, losing to Tui in 53.75% to win.

=== Muay (หมวย) ===
- Ratfah Deangpiboolsakul is the tenth housemate of the season to be evicted, on Day 99 with 49.03% to save.

=== Nara (นาร่า) ===
- Pimchanok Nara Du be is a 33 years old manager from Bangkok. She is the second housemate of the season to be evicted, on Day 29 with 21.98% to save.

=== Num (หนุ่ม) ===
- Udorn Phetsihng is from Samut Prakan.He is the eighth housemate of the season to be evicted, on Day 85 with 43.56% to save.

=== Peaky (เป็กกี้) ===
- Warissara Buskeaw is 26 years old from Surin. She is a shopkeeper and insurance salesman. She is the second housemate of the season to be evicted, on Day 29 with 21.98% to save.

=== Pim (พิม) ===
- Pimjak Chiwarak is a 23 years old student from Lampang. She is the fourth housemate of the season to be evicted, on Day 57 with 23.36% to save. But she returned on Day 75. Pim was the third place, losing to Yui & Heaw with 12.27% to win.

=== Pom (ป้อม) ===
- Chatchai Photipana is a 25 years old Chef from Phrae. He is the seventh housemate of the season to be evicted, on Day 78 with 38.38% to save.

=== Por (ป๋อ) ===
- Pramook Jareeprasit is the ninth housemate of the season to be evicted, on Day 92 with 10.13% to save.

=== Toto (โตโต้) ===
- Puwadol Jinsiri is a 23-year-old Hairdryer from Phuket. He is the third housemate of the season to be evicted, on Day 43 with 27.54%.

=== Tui (ตุ้ย) ===
- Nipon Perktim is the winner of the first season of Big Brother Thailand with 70.74% to win.

=== Yinmy (หยินมี่) ===
- Napatnaphet Thitiwongsaroj is a 24 years old student from Pathum Thani. She is the first housemate of the season to be ejected from the show for rule-breaking, on day 65.

== Nominations table ==
	Week 2	Week 4	Week 6	Week 8	Week 10	Week 11		Week 12	Week 13	Week 14	Week 15 Final		Nominations received
Tui	Aom-Am; Toto	Pim; Toto	Toto; Pim	Peaky; Pom	Peaky; Yinmy	Not eligible	Pom; Muay	Muay; Num	Muay; Pom	Muay; Pim	Winner (Day 106)		14
Heaw	Toto; Yinmy	Muay; Yinmy	Toto; Pim	Pim; Yinmy	Peaky; Muay	Not eligible	Pom; Heaw	Muay; Num	Por; Tui	Muay; Pim	Runner-Up (Day 106)		10
Pim	Yinmy; Nara	Nara; Peaky	Muay; Tui	Por; Muay	Evicted (Day 57)	Nominated	Exempt	Muay; Num	Heaw; Por	Heaw; Muay	Third Place (Day 106)		18
Muay	Tui; Yinmy	Pim; Toto	Toto; Yinmy	Pim; Tui	Heaw; Pom	Not eligible	Pom; Por	Num; Pim	Heaw; Pim	Pim; Tui	Evicted (Day 99)		20
Por	Toto; Yinmy	Pim; Toto	Pom; Toto	Num; Pim	Yinmy; Pom	Not eligible	Pom; Num	Muay; Pim	Heaw; Pim	Evicted (Day 92)			5
Num	Pim; Pom	Nara; Muay	Tui; Yinmy	Heaw; Muay	Pom; Heaw	Not eligible	Heaw; Pom	Heaw; Num	Evicted (Day 85)				10
Pom	Aom-Am; Por	Tui; Yinmy	Pom; Toto	Num; Pim	Tui; Yinmy	Not eligible	Num; Pom	Evicted (Day 78)					12
Peaky	Aom-Am; Yinmy	Nara; Yinmy	Muay; Yinmy	Pim; Yinmy	Tui; Yinmy	Nominated	Evicted (Day 71)						5
Yinmy	Nara; Peaky	Nara; Toto	Muay; Yinmy	Muay; Tui	Muay; Tui	Not eligible	Ejected (Day 65)						23
Toto	Aom-Am; Nara	Muay; Yinmy	Tui; Yinmy	Evicted (Day 43)		Nominated	Evicted (Day 43)						11
Nara	Tui; Yinmy	Num; Yinmy	Evicted (Day 29)										6
Aom-Am	Tui; Yinmy	Evicted (Day 15)				Nominated	Evicted (Day 15)						4
Notes					1, 2								
Against public vote	Aom-Am; Tui; Yinmy	Nara; Toto; Yinmy	Toto; Yinmy	Muay; Pim; Tui; Yinmy	Peaky; Pom; Por; Tui	Aom-Am; Peaky; Pim; Toto	Pom; Por	Muay; Num	Heaw; Pim; Por; Tui	Muay; Pim	Heaw; Pim; Tui		
Ejected	none				Yinmy	none							
Evicted	Aom-Am; 3.77% to save	Nara; 21.98% to save	Toto; 27.54% to save	Pim; 7.79% to save	Peaky; 5.77% to save	Peaky; 27.80% to re-enter	Pom; 38.38% to save	Num; 43.56% to save	Por; 10.13% to save	Muay; 49.03% to save	Pim; 12.27% to win	Heaw; 16.99% to win	
Evicted	Aom-Am; 3.77% to save	Nara; 21.98% to save	Toto; 27.54% to save	Pim; 7.79% to save	Peaky; 5.77% to save	Aom-Am; 15.39% to re-enter	Pom; 38.38% to save	Num; 43.56% to save	Por; 10.13% to save	Muay; 49.03% to save	Pim; 12.27% to win	Heaw; 16.99% to win	
Evicted	Aom-Am; 3.77% to save	Nara; 21.98% to save	Toto; 27.54% to save	Pim; 7.79% to save	Peaky; 5.77% to save	Toto; 3.06% to re-enter	Pom; 38.38% to save	Num; 43.56% to save	Por; 10.13% to save	Muay; 49.03% to save	Pim; 12.27% to win	Heaw; 16.99% to win	
Survived	Yinmy; 15.09% Tui; 81.14%	Toto; 26.11% Yinmy; 51.91%	Yinmy; 72.46%	Muay; 21.33% Yinmy; 22.86% Tui; 48.02%	Por; 8.41% Pom; 21.18% Tui; 64.64%	Pim; 53.75% to re-enter	Por; 61.62%	Muay; 56.44%	Pim; 17.77% Heaw; 22.29% Tui; 49.81%	Pim; 50.97%	Tui; 70.74% to win		

=== Notes ===
Automatic nomination by Big Brother (due to violation(s) rule, reserved housemate evictions)

- ^Note 1 : Peaky and Por were nominated by Big Brother for discussing nominations.
- ^Note 2 : Yinmy was also nominated, however, she was kicked off from the show for rule-breaking before the eviction.
