= Big Brother Thailand season 2 =

Big Brother Thailand
- Season 2
- Presented by: Sarunyoo Wongkrachang; Nana Raibeena
- No. of days: 178
- No. of housemates: 15
- Winner: Arisa Sonthirod (Tik)
- Runner-up: Sawatkon Nantapun (Bombay)

Release
- Original network: iTV
- Original release: 4 February – 31 July 2006

Season chronology
- ← Previous; Season 1

Big Brother Thailand 2 is the second season of the Thailand reality television series Big Brother Thailand and aired on iTV's primetime block. The season started on 4 February 2006, and ended on 21 May 2006, lasting 107 days. The season was won by Tik Arisa Sonthirod, about 65.96% of total votes cast during the open voting.

Saranyu Vonkarjun reprised his role as the primetime host, while ex-Inside Big Brother host Nana Ribeena helmed a brand-new show.

== Housemates ==
Name		Age on entry	Hometown	Day entered	Day exited	Result
Tik	Arisa Sonthirod	22	Ang Thong	1	178	Winner
Bombay	Sawatkon Nantapun	27	Ubon Ratchatani	1	178	Runner-up
Oh	Itsara Navee	27	Bangkok	1	178	3rd Place
Nok	Kanokrus Taewokut	29	Lamphun	1	175	Evicted
Boo	Kirt Tirat	25	Bangkok	129	156	Evicted
Boo	Kirt Tirat	25	Bangkok	1	128	Evicted
Pui	Nalintha KittiwanShe	27	Lamphun	1	142	Evicted
Jeff	Rcom Vichatpittayapong	20	Phichit	1	121	Ejected
Whan	Narisara Ngampasearchsopon	24	Nakhon Ratchasima	1	114	Evicted
Joe (Note: Birthday, Joe and Nui (who had all been previously evicted), re-entered the house On 46 and stayed in a secret room. and they left secret room on 49.)	Vitos Tunsurat	25	Bangkok	71	100	Evicted
Joe	Vitos Tunsurat	25	Bangkok	1	28	Evicted
Aum	Pannee Leedahod	20	Sing Buri	42	85	Evicted
Nui	Phonpatsorn Suwanmongkong	22	Lamphun	1	71	Evicted
Birthday	Surasak Dangrae	19	Prachuap Khiri Khan	1	71	Evicted
Oad	Surasak Showtitinnawat	23	Sa Kaeo	1	42	Ejected
Kate	Ngamnate Hirunchanachoke	20	Bangkok	1	42	Walked
Oil	Sirinthon Parnsamut	21	Bangkok	1	14	Evicted
Guests
Contestant	Age	Residence	Reality Show	Entered	Exited	Exchanged with...
(Sweden) Anton Granlund	23	Stockholm	Big Brother Norway & Sweden 2006	56	64	Boo

=== Pui (ปุ๋ย) ===
- Nalintha KittiwanShe is 27 years old from Lamphun. She is the ninth housemate of the season to be evicted, on Day 142 with 48.24% to save.She was one of the most nominated together with nok she was nominated 7 times she was one of the favorites but she went out against nok.

=== Joe (โจ) ===
- Vitos Tunsurat is 25 years old from Bangkok. He is the second housemate of the season to be evicted, on Day 28 with a 4 of 13 Votes and sixth housemate to be evicted on Day 100 with 47.25% to save.

=== Oil (ออย) ===
- Sirinthon Parnsamut is 21 years old from Bangkok. She is the first housemate of the season to be evicted, on Day 14 with a 4 of 14 Votes.

=== Birthday (เบริ์ดเดย์) ===
- Surasak Dangrae is 19 years old from Prachuap Khiri Khan. He is the third housemate of the season to be evicted, on Day 71 with 12.81% to save.

=== Kate (เกด) ===
- Ngamnate Hirunchanachoke is 20 years old from Bangkok. On Day 42, she is the Second housemate of the season to be evicted, on Day 71 with 6.28% to save.

=== Jeff (เจฟ) ===
- Rcom Vichatpittayapong is 20 years old from Phichit. On Day 121, Jeff is removed from the house after presenting with chickenpox.

=== Nok (นก) ===
- Kanokrus Taewokut is a 29 years old from Lamphun. She is the eleventh housemate of the season to be evicted, on Day 175 with 49.25% to save.She was the most controversial contestant and most hated by her roommates, she was nominated of the entire competition a total of 12 times and was considered one of the winners but she lost against Tik who then won the edition.

=== Bombay (บอมเบย์) ===
- Sawatkon Nantapun is 27 years old from Ubon Ratchatani. Bombay is the runner-up, losing to Tik in 23.09% to win.

=== Tik (ติ๊ก) ===
- Arisa Sonthirod is 22 years old from Ang Thong. Tik is the winner of Big Brother Thailand 2 with 65.96% to win.

=== Oad (โอ๊ค) ===
- Surasak Showtitinnawat is 23 years old from Sa Kaeo. On Day 42, Oad is kicked out for writing to Nok secret messages with a pen.

=== Nui (นุ้ย) ===
- Phonpatsorn Suwanmongkong is 22 years old from Lamphun. She is the fourth housemate of the season to be evicted, on Day 71 with 37.88% to save.

=== Boo (บู) ===
- Kirt Tirat is 25 years old from Bangkok. He is the eighth housemate of the season to be evicted, on Day 128 with 23.36% to save and the tenth housemate to be evicted on Day 156 with 46.99% to save.

=== Whan (หวาน) ===
- Narisara Ngampasearchsopon is 24 years old from Nakhon Ratchasima. She is the seventh housemate of the season to be evicted, on Day 114 with 17.55% to save.

=== Oh (โอ้) ===
- Itsara Navee is 27 years old from Bangkok. Oh is the third place housemate, losing to Tik & Bombay in 10.95% to win.

=== Aum (อุ้ม) ===
- Pannee Leedahod is 20 years old from Sing Buri. She is the fifth housemate of the season to be evicted, on Day 85 with 9.58% to save.

== Nominations table ==
	Week 2-3		Week 4-5	Week 6-7	Week 8-9	Week 10-11	Week 12-13	Week 14-15	Week 16-17	Week 18-19	Week 20-21	Week 22-23	Week 24-25	Week 26 Final		Nominations received
	Day 14	Day 28	Week 4-5	Week 6-7	Week 8-9	Week 10-11	Week 12-13	Week 14-15	Week 16-17	Week 18-19	Week 20-21	Week 22-23	Week 24-25	Week 26 Final		Nominations received
Tik	Nok	Nok	Nui, Nok	Nok, Tik	Nok, Nui	Joe	Nok, Pui	Bombay, Nok	Oh, Nok	Pui, Nok	Nok, Pui	Oh, Nok	Oh, Nok	Winner (Day 178)		10
Bombay	Nok	Nok	Nok, Oad	Birthday, Tik	Jeff, Nok	Birthday	Aum, Nok	Joe, Nok	Jeff, Nok	Jeff, Pui	Nok, Pui	Boo, Nok	Nok, Tik	Runner-up (Day 178)		6
Oh	Oil	Pui	Kate, Pui	Nok, Tik	Nui, Pui	Birthday	Aum, Nok	Joe, Nok	Nok, Whan	Boo, Nok	Nok, Pui	Boo, Nok	Nok, Tik	Third place (Day 178)		10
Nok	Oil	Joe	Nui, Whan	Boo, Pui	Boo, Pui	Joe	Pui, Whan	Pui, Tik	Pui, Tik	Pui, Tik	Pui, Tik	Boo, Tik	Bombay, Tik	Evicted (Day 175)		82
Boo	Oh	Joe	Kate, Nui	Nok, Nui	Nok, Nui	Birthday	In Norway & Sweden House	Joe, Nok	Nok, Pui	Pui, Tik	Evicted (Day 128)	Bombay, Oh	Re-evicted (Day 156)			10
Pui	Nok	Nok	Nui, Nok	Nok, Nui	Nok, Nui	Not eligible	Nok, Whan	Joe, Nok	Nok, Whan	Boo, Nok	Bombay, Nok	Evicted (Day 142)				44
Jeff	Nok	Joe	Birthday, Nok	Birthday, Nok	Jeff, Nok	Joe	Aum, Nok	Joe, Nok	Nok, Whan	Bombay, Nok	Ejected (Day 121)					7
Whan	Nui	Nok	Nok, Nui	Nok, Nui	Nok, Nui	Joe	Aum, Nok	Nok, Tik	Jeff, Nok	Evicted (Day 114)						12
Joe	Oil	Nok	Evicted (Day 28)			Secret; Room	Exempt	Pui, Nok	Re-evicted (Day 100)							10
Aum	Not in House			Nok, Pui	Nui, Whan	Joe	Nok, Pui	Evicted (Day 85)								6
Nui	Oh	Joe	Kate, Nok	Pui, Nok	Nok, Pui	Secret; Room	Evicted (Day 71)									15
Birthday	Nok	Pui	Pui, Nok	Nok, Birthday	Evicted (Day 56)	Secret; Room	Evicted (Day 71)									4
Oad	Pui	Nui	Nui, Nok	Ejected (Day 42)												6
Kate	Oil	Kate	Nok, Pui	Evicted (Day 42)												6
Oil	Pui	Evicted (Day 14)														4
Notes	1	2	3	None			4, 5	None		6	None			7		
Nominated For Eviction	Oil, Nok, Pui	Joe, Nok, Pui'	Kate, Nok, Pui	Birthday, Nok, Nui, Pui, Tik	Nok, Nui	Joe, Birthday, Nui	Aum, Pui, Nok	Joe, Nok	Nok, Whan	Boo, Nok, Pui	Nok, Pui	Boo, Nok	Nok, Tik	Bombay, Oh, Tik		
Walked	none		Kate	none												
Ejected	none		Oad	none						Jeff	none					
Evicted	Oil; 4 of 14 votes to evict	Joe; 4 of 13 votes to evict	Kate; 6.28% to save	Birthday; 12.81% to save	Nui; 37.88% to save	Joe; 5 of 8 votes to return	Aum; 9.58% to save	Joe; 47.25% to save	Whan; 17.55% to save	Boo; 20.36% to save	Pui; 48.24% to save	Boo; 36.99% to save	Nok; 49.25% to save	Oh; 10.95% to win	Bombay; 23.09% to win	
Survived	Pui; 1 vote% Nok; 3 vote	Pui; 2 vote% Nok; 3 vote	Pui; 45.94% Nok; 47.42%	Nui; 13.64% Tik; 20.75% Pui; 24.41; Nok; 28.39%	Nok; 62.12%	Birthday; 3 of 8 votes Nui; 0 of 8 votes	Pui; 43.94% Nok; 46.48%	Nok; 52.75%	Nok; 82.45%	Pui; 36.46% Nok; 40.18%	Nok; 52.76%	Nok; 64.01%	Tik; 50.75%	Tik; 65.96% to win		

Automatically nominated by Big Brother

=== Notes ===
- ^Note 1 : On Day 2, housemates were asked to vote for one other housemate that they would like to see evicted. Oil received the most votes to evict with 4 and was immediately evicted.
- ^Note 2 : On Day 5, housemates, again, were asked to vote for one other housemate that they would like to see evicted. Joe received the most votes to evict with 4 and was immediately evicted.
- ^Note 3 : Week 2's nominations were voided and eviction was cancelled when Kate walked on Day 10.
- ^Note 4 : Boo couldn't nominate, as he was a guest in the Norwegian/Swedish version of Big Brother. Pui was automatically nominated by Big Brother for rule-breaking.
- ^Note 5 : Birthday, Joe and Nui (who had all been previously evicted), re-entered the house and stayed in a secret room. Pui had to take care of them without the other housemates finding out that they were there. She passed her secret mission and had to choose one of the 3 to re-enter the main house and become a housemate again. Housemates chose Joe. Joe re-entered the main house on Day 51, Birthday and Nui left the secret room.
- ^Note 6 : Boo was automatically nominated this Week for discussing/influencing nominations. Jeff was removed from the house on Day 77 after contracting chickenpox. As Jeff was removed, he was to be replaced by a former housemate, as voted for by the Public. All evicted housemates apart from Joe & Whan are eligible to return. Boo was chosen by the Public to re-enter the house just one day after he was Evicted with 62.31% of the vote to Nui's 13.07%, Birthday's 12.42%, Oil's 10.39% and Aum's 1.81%.
- ^Note 7 : The final three housemates all automatically faced the Public Vote to win.
