= Big Brother 4 =

Big Brother 4 is the fourth season of various versions of Big Brother and may refer to:

- Big Brother 2002 (Netherlands), the 2002 Dutch edition of Big Brother
- Gran Hermano Spain (Season 4), the 2002-2003 edition of Big Brother in Spain
- Big Brother Germany (Season 4), the 2003 German edition of Big Brother
- Big Brother 4 (UK), the 2003 UK edition of Big Brother
- Big Brother 4 (U.S.), the 2003 US edition of Big Brother
- Big Brother 4 (Australia), the 2004 Australian edition of Big Brother
- Big Brother Brasil 4, the 2004 Brazilian edition of Big Brother
- Grande Fratello Season 4, the first 2004 edition of Big Brother in Italy
- Big Brother 4 (Big Mother), the 2005 Greek edition of Big Brother
- Gran Hermano Argentina (Season 4), the first 2007 Argentinian edition of Big Brother
- Big Brother 4 (Croatia), the 2007 Croatian edition of Big Brother
- Big Brother 4 (Bulgaria), the 2008 Bulgarian edition of Big Brother
- Big Brother 2008 (Finland), the 2008 edition of Big Brother in Finland
- Big Brother Africa (season 4), the 2009 African edition of Big Brother
- Secret Story 2010 (France), the 2010 edition of Big Brother in France
- Bigg Boss 4 (disambiguation)
  - Bigg Boss (Season 4), the 2010-2011 edition of Big Brother in India in Hindi
  - Bigg Boss Kannada (season 4), fourth season of Big Brother in India in Kannada
  - Bigg Boss (Malayalam season 4), fourth season of Big Brother in India in Malayalam
  - Bigg Boss Marathi (season 4), fourth season of Big Brother in India in Marathi
  - Bigg Boss (Tamil season 4), fourth season of Big Brother in India in Tamil
  - Bigg Boss (Telugu season 4), 2020 edition of Big Brother in India in Telugu
- Veliki brat 2011, the 2011 edition of Big Brother in Serbia, Bosnia and Herzegovina, Macedonia, Montenegro, and Croatia
- Big Brother Norway (Season 4), the 2011 edition of Big Brother in Norway
- Pinoy Big Brother (season 4), the 2011-2012 edition of Big Brother in the Philippines
- Big Brother 2012 (Denmark), the 2012 Danish edition of Big Brother
- HaAh HaGadol 4, the 2012 edition of Big Brother in Israel
- Secret Story 4 (Portugal), the 2013 edition of Big Brother in Portugal
- Big Brother Canada (season 4), the 2016 edition of Big Brother Canada

== See also ==
- Big Brother (franchise)
- Big Brother (disambiguation)
