= Big Brother 3 =

Big Brother 3 is the third season of various versions of Big Brother and may refer to:

- Big Brother 2001 (Netherlands), the 2001 Dutch edition of Big Brother
- Big Brother Germany (Season 3), the 2001 German edition of Big Brother
- Gran Hermano Spain (Season 3), the 2002 edition of Big Brother in Spain
- Big Brother 3 (UK), the 2002 UK edition of Big Brother
- Big Brother 3 (U.S.), the 2002 US edition of Big Brother
- Gran Hermano Argentina (Season 3), the 2002-2003 Argentinian edition of Big Brother
- Big Brother Australia 2003, the 2003 Australian edition of Big Brother
- Big Brother Brasil 3, the 2003 Brazilian edition of Big Brother
- Big Brother 3 (The Wall), the 2003 Greek edition of Big Brother
- Grande Fratello Season 3, the 2003 edition of Big Brother in Italy
- Big Brother 3 (Bulgaria), the 2006 Bulgarian edition of Big Brother
- Big Brother 3 (Croatia), the 2006 Croatian edition of Big Brother
- Big Brother 2007 (Finland), the 2007 edition of Big Brother in Finland
- Big Brother Africa (season 3), the 2008 African edition of Big Brother
- Veliki brat 2009, the 2009 edition of Big Brother in Serbia, Bosnia and Herzegovina, Macedonia, and Montenegro
- Secret Story 2009 (France), the 2009 edition of Big Brother in France
- Bigg Boss 3 (disambiguation)
  - Bigg Boss (Hindi season 3), the 2009 Hindi-language edition of Big Brother in India
  - Bigg Boss Kannada (season 3), third season of Big Brother in India in Kannada
  - Bigg Boss (Malayalam season 3), third season of Big Brother in India in Malayalam
  - Bigg Boss Marathi (season 3), third season of Big Brother in India in Marathi
  - Bigg Boss (Tamil season 3), third season of Big Brother in India in Tamil
  - Bigg Boss (Telugu season 3), the 2019 Telugu-language edition of Big Brother in India
- Pinoy Big Brother: Double Up, the 2009-2010 edition of Big Brother in the Philippines
- Big Brother 3 (Albania), the 2010 Albanian edition of Big Brother
- HaAh HaGadol 3, the 2010–2011 edition of Big Brother in Israel
- Secret Story 3 (Portugal), the 2012 edition of Big Brother in Portugal
- Big Brother Canada (season 3), the 2015 edition of Big Brother Canada

== See also ==
- Big Brother (franchise)
- Big Brother (disambiguation)
