= Big Brother Canada season 1 =

Season of television series

Big Brother Canada
- Season 1
- Big Brother Canada 1 title card
- Presented by: Arisa Cox
- No. of days: 71
- No. of houseguests: 15
- Winner: Jillian MacLaughlin
- Runner-up: Gary Levy
- Companion show: Big Brother Canada: After Dark
- No. of episodes: 29

Release
- Original network: Slice
- Original release: February 27 – May 2, 2013

Season chronology
- Next → Season 2

Big Brother Canada 1 is the first season of the Canadian reality television series Big Brother Canada. The season began airing on February 27, 2013. Based on the worldwide franchise of the same name, it saw fifteen HouseGuests competing to win the show's grand prize. It is the first English adaption of the series to be held in Canada, although all seasons of the North American edition have been broadcast in the country. Arisa Cox served as the show's host during its ten-week run, concluding on May 2, 2013 when Jillian MacLaughlin was crowned the winner. The season proved to be a hit for Slice, significantly boosting the network's ratings and boosting traffic onto the official website.

== HouseGuests ==
The cast of the first season of Big Brother Canada. From left to right: AJ, Danielle, Liza, Alec, Talla, Emmett, Kat, Aneal, Jillian, Gary, Andrew, Suzette, Peter, Tom, and Topaz

The inaugural cast of fifteen contestants was revealed on February 20, 2013.

Name	Age	Occupation	Residence	Entry	Result
Jillian MacLaughlin	27	Teacher	New Glasgow, Nova Scotia	1	Winner; Day 71
Gary Levy	21	Fashion stylist assistant	Toronto, Ontario	57	Runner-up; Day 71
Gary Levy	21	Fashion stylist assistant	Toronto, Ontario	1	Evicted; Day 43
Emmett Blois	25	Dairy farmer	Gore, Nova Scotia	1	Evicted; Day 71
Talla Rejaei	26	Independent living support	Edmonton, Alberta	1	Evicted; Day 67
Andrew Monaghan	38	Insurance sales trainer	Halifax, Nova Scotia	1	Evicted; Day 64
Peter Brown	26	Web content curator	Surrey, British Columbia	1	Evicted; Day 57
Emerald "Topaz" Brady	27	Dental hygienist	Scarborough, Ontario	1	Evicted; Day 50
Alec Beall	27	Social psychology student	Vancouver, British Columbia	1	Evicted; Day 50
Anuj "AJ" Burman	32	Director of Business Development	Scarborough, Ontario	1	Evicted; Day 37
Suzette Amaya	36	Radio show host & Motivational speaker	Vancouver, British Columbia	1	Evicted; Day 36
Liza Stinton	29	Tanning salon owner	Toronto, Ontario	1	Evicted; Day 29
Tom Plant	25	Firefighter	Edmonton, Alberta	1	Evicted; Day 29
Aneal Ramkissoon	21	Student	Richmond Hill, Ontario	1	Evicted; Day 22
Danielle Alexander	20	Aspiring actress	Calgary, Alberta	1	Evicted; Day 15
Kat Yee	27	Bartender	Toronto, Ontario	1	Evicted; Day 8

=== Future appearances ===
Runner-up Gary Levy returned to compete on the show's fifth season. Blois would also particapte Big Brother Mzansi - the South African version of Big Brother as a guest. He remained in house for a week, attempting to cause trouble among the contestants.

Outside of Big Brother Canada, Jillian MacLaughlin and Emmett Blois competed on The Amazing Race Canada 4 in 2016 and finished in second place.

== Season summary ==
=== Days 1–37 ===
The original fifteen HouseGuests entered the House on 21 February, referred to as Day 1. Suzette was crowned the first Head of Household of the season when she answered the red phone located in the storage room; she chose to nominate Emmett and Tom based on first impressions that night. Peter, Aneal, and Gary were chosen to compete alongside Suzette and her nominations in the "Power Popper" Power of Veto competition held on the first night. Tom won the competition, which required HouseGuests to pop balloons with their belt to find puzzle pieces. Tom chose to remove himself from the block at the first Power of Veto ceremony, with Kat being named the replacement nominee. Suzette felt that Kat had played the game too hard in the first few days. The HouseGuests were later set a task in which they had to remain handcuffed in pairs for a total of twenty-four hours; they successfully completed the task and won alcohol. Alec, Emmett, Peter, and Tom later formed the "Quatro" alliance, while Alec and Peter formed "The Sheyld" alliance. On Day 8, Kat became the first HouseGuest to be evicted from the House in a vote of eleven to one.

Jillian won the "Lumber Jack and Jill" endurance Head of Household competition that night. Alec, Peter, Tom, and Talla lost the "Batter Up" Have-Not challenge on Day 9. Jillian nominated Aneal and Gary on Day 10 with Aneal being the target. Peter, AJ, and Danielle competed with Jillian and the nominations in the "Oh Snow You Didn't!" competition that night, which Gary won. Gary removed himself from the block on Day 11, with Danielle being nominated in his place as a pawn. Danielle was evicted on Day 15 due to paranoia of a girls alliance on Quatro's behalf. Tom proceeded to win the "Popular Vote" quiz competition. Alec, Aneal, Jillian, and Topaz became Have-Nots after losing the "Dem Apples" competition on Day 16. Gary and Suzette were nominated later that day with Suzette being the target. Topaz, Liza, and Aneal were selected to compete with Tom and his nominees in the "Puck Off" Power of Veto competition, with Talla hosting; Tom was the winner. On Day 18, Andrew was given a task through the phone and passed. Tom chose to remove Gary from the block, nominating AJ as a pawn in his place. Moments before the live eviction on Day 22, Suzette was saved by Canada's Veto in a Power Play twist, with Tom naming Aneal her replacement nominee; Aneal was subsequently evicted.

Though Emmett initially won the "Bees Knees" Head of Household competition that night, it was revealed that Alec, Emmett, Jillian, and Talla had broken rules during the competition; as a result, they were Have-Nots for the week and Emmett was stripped of his title. The four were not permitted to compete in the new "Remember That" Head of Household competition on Day 23, which Gary won. Gary nominated the romantic duo of Tom and Liza for eviction on Day 24. Alec, AJ, and Jillian were chosen to compete in the "Big Brother Bonspeil" Power of Veto competition, with Alec being the winner. He chose to leave nominations the same on Day 26. Though Liza was Gary's target, Tom was evicted on Day 29 after his Quatro alliance turned against him. Learning that it would be a double eviction night, Andrew won the "Face Off" competition and nominated Liza and Suzette for eviction. Peter, AJ, and Emmett were chosen to compete in the "Kid in a Candy Store" competition; Emmett won and left nominations the same. Liza was then evicted from the House in a unanimous vote.

Alec went on to win "The Great Urban Adventure" competition, earning a $10,000 prize and a video from home on top of the Head of Household title. He nominated AJ and Suzette for eviction on Day 31, targeting Suzette. Gary, Jillian, and Emmett competed with Alec and the nominations in the "Cabin Fever" competition hosted by Peter that night. Emmett won the Power of Veto and a slop pass. AJ was given a task from Marsha the Moose on Day 32. Emmett chose to leave nominations the same on Day 33. Suzette was evicted on Day 36. When Topaz won the Head of Household competition, she learned she had five minutes to name two nominations; unbeknownst to her, the house watched her debating whom to nominate. Being an instant eviction, there would be no Power of Veto. She nominated AJ and Andrew in hopes of evicting Andrew, but The Sheyld alliance betrayed her which resulted in AJ being evicted on Day 37.

=== Days 37–71 ===
Andrew won the "Diary Room Confessions" competition following AJ's eviction, and nominated Gary and Topaz that night with Gary being the target. Andrew named Emmett, Gary, Peter, and Topaz as Have-Nots. Emmett, Jillian, Andrew, and Talla then formed the East Coast alliance. Alec, Talla, and Peter were selected for the "Build a Demon" competition hosted by Jillian; this competition was sponsored by the then-upcoming film Evil Dead (2013). Andrew won the competition, as well as an advanced screening of the film for himself, Jillian, and Talla. Andrew chose to leave nominations the same on Day 40, resulting in Gary's eviction on Day 43. Jillian went on to win the "Iceberg Alley" endurance competition that night, promising Topaz safety for her and Alec in the process. The House was given a task on Day 44 through the phone to earn food for the week; they passed and had full food privileges. Jillian nominated Alec and Peter that night, targeting Alec. Peter won the "Bridge to Veto" competition, for which Talla, Topaz, and Andrew also competed. Peter was given a secret task on Day 46 and passed. Peter removed himself from the block on Day 47, with Topaz being named the replacement nominee. Alec was evicted on Day 50 as the first of a double eviction.

Emmett won the "Plead Your Case" competition and nominated Talla and Topaz for eviction. Peter won the "You've Got Mail" competition minutes later, and chose to leave nominations the same. Topaz then became the second HouseGuest evicted that night. Jillian won the "Chicken Flew the Coop" competition later that night, giving the East Coast alliance another victory. Andrew and Talla became the Have-Nots for the week after the "Rub a Dub Dub" competition on Day 51. Jillian chose to nominate Andrew and Peter on Day 52. Andrew won the "Sleep Tight with the PoV" obstacle course competition on Day 53, along with $10,000 to be spent at The Brick. That night, HouseGuests were given the Freeze Frame task which required them to freeze on command. Andrew's twin brother briefly entered the House during the task. Andrew used the Power of Veto on himself on Day 54, with Talla being the replacement nominee. Peter was evicted from the house on Day 57 in a unanimous vote. The house learned of that week's Power Play twist following his eviction, which had seen the public voting all week for one of the first four jury members to return to the game; Gary was selected, and re-entered the House on Day 57 following a two-week absence.

Emmett won the "Brick by Brick" competition following these events. Talla was given a secret task from Marsha the Moose on Day 58 and passed. Gary and Andrew were nominated for eviction that night, with Gary being the target. Dan Gheesling, who rose to fame as the winner of the tenth season of the United States edition, entered the House on Day 59 to coach the HouseGuests and host the Power of Veto competition. Gary won "The Price of Veto" competition that night, while Emmett won $1,000 and Talla won a slop pass. Dan made his departure on Day 60 after spending the night in the House. Gary removed himself from the block on Day 61, with Talla being nominated in his place. Andrew was evicted from the House on Day 64. Jillian won the "What the Dunk" competition that night. On Day 65, the HouseGuests participated in the "And the Award Goes To..." task. Gary and Talla were nominated for eviction that night. Emmett won the "Safe From Eviction" competition on Day 66, granting him the sole power to evict either Gary or Talla. He chose to evict Talla from the House on Day 67.

The remaining three began the three-part final Head of Household competition that night, with Emmett winning the endurance "Blood on My Hands" competition. Gary won the second portion of the competition, which consisted of an obstacle course and memory games. Gary won the final portion on Day 71, becoming the final Head of Household of the season. Minutes later he chose to evict Emmett, making Gary and Jillian the final two HouseGuests. Jillian was then chosen as the winner of the season, controversially receiving four of the seven jury votes.

== Have-Not(s) ==
	Week 1	Week 2	Week 3	Week 4 (Note: Alec, Emmett, Jillian and Talla were made Have-Nots as punishment for breaking the rules in the HoH competition.)	Week 5	Week 6 (Note: The Have-Nots were decided by HoH Andrew. Emmett used a slop pass he won in Week 5's Power of Veto competition. This, however, did not exempt him from sleeping in the Have-Not room nor from taking cold showers.)	Week 7 (Note: As a reward for passing a red phone mission, all HouseGuests were Haves for the week.)	Week 8 (Note: In addition to their Have-Not status, Andrew and Talla had to wake up to a 10-minute video of Emmett and Jillian kissing, be the house staff for the entire house for 72 hours and wake up one hour before the Haves in order to do their house staff chores.)	Week 9	Week 10
Have-Nots	none	Alec, Peter, Talla, Tom	Alec, Aneal, Jillian, Topaz	Alec, Emmett, Jillian, Talla	none	Emmett, Gary, Peter, Topaz	none	Andrew, Talla	none	

== Nominations Cermony ==
Before the week's Nominations Ceremony, the Head of Household would put the keys of the HouseGuests not nominated in the Nomination Wall. At the Nomination Ceremony, the HoH will pull the first key from the wall and declare that HouseGuest as safe. The saved HouseGuest would pull the next key, with the process continuing until there are no keys in the wall. The two HouseGuests who don’t receive their key are nominated for eviction.

	Week 1 (Note: Due to the opening night twist, no formal nomination ceremony occurred for week 1.)	Week 2	Week 3	Week 4 (Note: Due to a double eviction, no formal nomination ceremony occurred for the second round of week 4.)		Week 5	Week 6 (Note: Due to an instant eviction, no formal nomination ceremony occurred for the first round of week 6.)		Week 7 (Note: Due to a double eviction, no formal nomination ceremony occurred for the second round of week 7.)		Week 8	Week 9	Week 10 (Note: No nomination ceremony was held for the final eviction, as the nominees were the losers of the Final HoH competition.)	
HOH	Suzette	Jillian	Tom	Gary	Andrew	Alec	Topaz	Andrew	Jillian	Emmett	Jillian	Emmett	Jillian	Gary
1	N/A	Emmett	Emmett	Peter	N/A	Topaz	N/A	Talla	Emmett	N/A	Talla	Jillian	Emmett	
2	N/A	Topaz	Liza	Topaz	N/A	Talla	N/A	Peter	Andrew	N/A	Emmett	Talla		
3	N/A	Suzette	Aneal	Suzette	N/A	Peter	N/A	Alec	Talla	N/A				
4	N/A	Alec	Talla	Talla	N/A	Jillian	N/A	Jillian	Topaz					
5	N/A	Talla	Topaz	Andrew	N/A	Andrew	N/A	Emmett						
6	N/A	Andrew	Alec	Emmett	N/A	Emmett	N/A							
7	N/A	Tom	Andrew	Alec	N/A	Gary								
8	N/A	Liza	Jillian	AJ	N/A									
9	N/A	Peter	Peter	Jillian										
10	N/A	Danielle	AJ											
11	N/A	AJ												
Original Nominations	Emmett; Tom	Aneal; Gary	Gary; Suzette	Liza; Tom	Liza; Suzette	AJ; Suzette	AJ; Andrew	Gary; Topaz	Alec; Peter	Talla; Topaz	Andrew; Peter	Andrew; Gary	Gary; Talla	Emmett; Jillian

== Voting history ==
Color key:

Winner
Runner-up
Head of Household
Nominated for eviction
Evicted
Re-entered the game

	Week 1	Week 2	Week 3	Week 4		Week 5	Week 6		Week 7		Week 8	Week 9	Week 10		
	Week 1	Week 2	Week 3	Day 23	Day 29 (Note: This week was a double eviction week. Following the first eviction, the remaining HouseGuests played a week's worth of games, including Head of Household and veto competitions, and nomination, veto and eviction ceremonies, during the live show, culminating in a second eviction for the week.)	Week 5	Day 36 (Note: This week was an instant eviction week. Immediately after nominations, the HouseGuests were instructed to cast their votes to evict.)	Day 38	Day 44	Day 50	Week 8	Week 9	Day 65	Day 71	Finale
Head of Household	Suzette (Note: Shortly after the Houseguests entered the House, Suzette answered the Red Phone and Big Brother named her the first Head of Household. She had to nominate two HouseGuests for eviction that night based solely on her first impressions, she could not politic or discuss the nominations with anyone.)	Jillian	Tom	~~Emmett~~ (Note: Emmett was initially the Head of Household but had the title revoked after it was discovered that he had broken the rules of the competition.); Gary	Andrew	Alec	Topaz	Andrew	Jillian	Emmett	Jillian	Emmett	Jillian	Gary	(None)
Nominations (pre-veto)	Emmett; Tom	Aneal; Gary	Gary; Suzette	Liza; Tom	Liza; Suzette	AJ; Suzette	AJ; Andrew	Gary; Topaz	Alec; Peter	Talla; Topaz	Andrew; Peter	Andrew; Gary	Gary; Talla	Emmett; Jillian	(None)
Veto Winner	Tom	Gary	Tom	Alec	Emmett	Emmett	(None)	Andrew	Peter	Peter	Andrew	Gary	Emmett	(None)	(None)
Nominations (post-veto)	Emmett; Kat	Aneal; Danielle	AJ; Aneal; ~~Suzette~~ (Note: Canada voted to remove Suzette from the block.)	Liza; Tom	Liza; Suzette	AJ; Suzette	(None)	Gary; Topaz	Alec; Topaz	Talla; Topaz	Peter; Talla	Andrew; Talla	Gary; Talla	(None)	(None)
Jillian	Kat	Head of Household	AJ	Tom	Liza	Suzette	AJ	Gary	Head of Household	Topaz	Head of Household	Andrew	Head of Household	Nominated	Winner (Day 71)
Gary	Kat	Aneal	Aneal	Head of Household	Liza	AJ	Andrew	Nominated	Evicted (Day 43)			Andrew	Nominated	Emmett (Note: As Head of Household, Gary chose to evict Emmett.)	Runner-up (Day 71)
Emmett	Nominated	Danielle	Aneal	Liza	Liza	Suzette	AJ	Gary	Alec	Head of Household	Peter	Head of Household	Talla	Evicted (Day 71)	Jillian
Talla	Kat	Aneal	Aneal	Tom	Liza	Suzette	Andrew	Gary	Alec	Nominated	Nominated	Nominated	Nominated	Evicted (Day 67)	Jillian
Andrew	Kat	Danielle	Aneal	Tom	Head of Household	Suzette	Nominated	Head of Household	Alec	Topaz	Peter	Nominated	Evicted (Day 64)		Jillian
Peter	Kat	Danielle	Aneal	Tom	Liza	Suzette	AJ	Gary	Topaz	Topaz	Nominated	Evicted (Day 57)			Gary
Topaz	Kat	Danielle	Aneal	Tom	Liza	Suzette	Head of Household	Nominated	Nominated	Nominated	Evicted (Day 50)				Jillian
Alec	Kat	Danielle	Aneal	Tom	Liza	Head of Household	AJ	Gary	Nominated	Evicted (Day 50)					Gary
AJ	Kat	Danielle	Nominated	Tom	Liza	Nominated	Nominated	Evicted (Day 37)							Gary
Suzette	Head of Household	Aneal	Aneal	Tom	Nominated	Nominated	Evicted (Day 36)								
Liza	Emmett	Danielle	AJ	Nominated	Nominated	Evicted (Day 29)									
Tom	Kat	Danielle	Head of Household	Nominated	Evicted (Day 29)										
Aneal	Kat	Nominated	Nominated	Evicted (Day 22)											
Danielle	Kat	Nominated	Evicted (Day 15)												
Kat	Nominated	Evicted (Day 8)													
Evicted	Kat; 11 of 12 votes to evict	Danielle; 8 of 11 votes to evict	Aneal; 8 of 10 votes to evict	Tom; 8 of 9 votes to evict	Liza; 8 of 8 votes to evict	Suzette; 6 of 7 votes to evict	AJ; 4 of 6 votes to evict	Gary; 5 of 5 votes to evict	Alec; 3 of 4 votes to evict	Topaz; 3 of 3 votes to evict	Peter; 2 of 2 votes to evict	Gary; 39.18% to return (Note: Canada voted for one of the first four jury members – AJ, Gary, Alec, or Topaz – to return to the game. Gary received 39.18% of the public vote and re-entered the House on Day 57. Alec received 34.96%, AJ received 21.18% and Topaz received 4.68%.)	Talla; Emmett's choice to evict	Emmett; Gary's choice to evict	Jillian; 4 votes to win
Evicted	Kat; 11 of 12 votes to evict	Danielle; 8 of 11 votes to evict	Aneal; 8 of 10 votes to evict	Tom; 8 of 9 votes to evict	Liza; 8 of 8 votes to evict	Suzette; 6 of 7 votes to evict	AJ; 4 of 6 votes to evict	Gary; 5 of 5 votes to evict	Alec; 3 of 4 votes to evict	Topaz; 3 of 3 votes to evict	Peter; 2 of 2 votes to evict	Andrew; 2 of 2 votes to evict	Talla; Emmett's choice to evict	Emmett; Gary's choice to evict	Gary; 3 votes to win

== Production ==
The franchise had previously aired in Quebec through Loft Story and Big Brother Quebec from 2003 to 2010. Global has also aired all episodes of the United States edition since it premiered in 2000. It was announced by Shaw Media in 2012 that an official Canadian edition of the series would begin production and air through the Slice network. Robyn Kass, responsible for casting the United States version, was brought in to cast the HouseGuests. Casting for the series began in July 2012 and concluded the following January, with open casting calls in Vancouver, Calgary, Halifax, Montreal, and Toronto. Those applying were required to be over the age of nineteen by February 2013. It was reported that over 4,000 online applications were submitted, while an additional 6,000 appeared at open casting calls. Despite initial reports that fourteen HouseGuests would compete in the inaugural season, this was pushed to fifteen due to the large amount of applicants. It was confirmed in January 2013 that Arisa Cox would appear as the host for the series. Cox, a radio personality at the time, was a fan of the United States edition as well as a Reality Show contestant herself, with her participation on U8TV: The Lofters.

The first season was produced by Endemol, Insight Productions, and Shaw Media. It was given a similar broadcast schedule to the United States adaption, airing on Wednesday, Thursday, and Sunday each week. Cox hosted the live Thursday eviction episodes. Episodes aired at 8 pm Central time. The show adopted the live feed, allowing viewers to watch the House at all times, that has been used in various incarnations of the series. The feed was available free of charge through the official Slice website. Global later confirmed that the spin-off series Big Brother: After Dark would air alongside the series each night. The series provided a free live feed into the House for Slice viewers, similar to the United States show of the same name. The Brick and Chevrolet were the sponsors for the season. The winner of the season would receive a $25,000 gift card to The Brick and a new Chevrolet Trax, alongside the standard $100,000 prize. The Chevrolet sponsorship resulted in the Power Play twists in the game, which included giving Canada their own Power of Veto in the third week and bringing back one of the members of the jury in the eighth week. Online, viewers could participate in a Power Play game that gave points for correctly guessing who would win competitions, be nominated, or be evicted each week.

The fifteen HouseGuests were revealed on 20 February through Slice. The season featured a total of eight men and seven women. The House was unveiled on 22 February. Having begun construction in September 2012, the House was located at Orbiter Studios in Mississauga, Ontario. The House featured sixty-four cameras and fifty microphones, not including the mandatory microphones worn by the HouseGuests. The "backyard" of the House was located inside due to potential weather complications, though a small outdoor area featured a hot tub and lounge area. The lights in the backyard of the House did mimic a sunrise and sunset as the day goes on, simulating the outdoors. This area features a "contemporary Canada" theme along the walls, with images of popular Canadian culture items being painted on; a pool is also included in this section. The House only featured two bedrooms, one being a communal bedroom with seven double beds and the other being the Head of Household suite. Similarly, there is one communal bathroom and one in the suite. The living room was described by Cox as "mid-century modern". The House was two stories, with the House's main entrance and the Head of Household suite being located upstairs. The hallway leading into the Diary Room was home to Marsha the Moose, voiced by producer Trevor Boris, who at times gave HouseGuests secret tasks. Marsha would become a recurring character throughout the series.

== Reception and controversy ==
The premiere episode was viewed by an estimated 3.3 million viewers, making it the most viewed event of the night for both that timeslot and the night as a whole. In terms of the 18–49 age demographic, which is the main target audience for the series, the series had a total of 1.4 million for A2+ and 735,000 for 18–49. It placed second in this demographic, only behind the new episode of Survivor: Caramoan. The premiere aired on both Slice and Global, the latter of which airs the US version of the series. The premiere had an AMA of 340,000 on Slice (A2+) alone, giving it the highest ratings for any series to air on the channel at the time. The second episode, airing the following day, saw a dramatic increase in ratings. There was a 79% increase for A2+, 96% for A25-54 and 106% for W25-54 over the night. This episode is also the highest rated show to be broadcast by Shaw Media in 2013 at the time. This episode also had an AMA of 608,000, giving it the new record for the channel. The premiere had previously broken the record only the day before. On placing the series on Slice, Senior Vice-President of Shaw Media stated "It was a bit of a gamble. But we also saw it as an opportunity to take a monster show and use it to drive growth to a smaller channel." Newswire referred to it as the "biggest reality series of the year."

Despite the show's ratings success, the show's jury vote during the live finale proved to be a controversial point for the series. When voting during the finale, jury members place their votes for who they would wish to see win the series as opposed to who to evict. Jury member Topaz Brady, who had been betrayed by finalist Jillian MacLaughlin and had a close friendship with the second finalist Gary Levy, intended to cast her vote for Levy to win. When her vote was revealed as being for MacLaughlin, Brady objected and insisted she had voted for Levy to win the series. Footage revealed that Brady had in fact mistakenly placed her vote for MacLaughlin; as the rules state that the jury vote is final, Brady's vote officially went to MacLaughlin. Due to Brady's misplaced vote, MacLaughlin was crowned the winner of the series receiving four of the seven jury votes. Levy expressed no unhappiness towards the outcome upon exiting the House.
