= Big Brother (Indonesian TV series) =

- Also known as: Big Brother Indonesia
- Presented by: Sarah Sechan; Indra Herlambang
- Country of origin: Indonesia
- Original language: Indonesian
- No. of seasons: 1

Production
- Production company: Endemol

Original release
- Network: Trans TV
- Release: 10 April – 17 September 2011

Related
- Big Brother

Big Brother Indonesia (also known as Big Brother Indonesia with SimPATI for sponsorship reason) was an Indonesian version of the international reality television franchise Big Brother created by producer John de Mol Jr. in 1997. The show is based on a group of strangers, known as housemates, living together twenty-four hours a day in the "Big Brother" house, isolated from the outside world but under constant surveillance with no privacy for roughly six months.

The show, sponsored by Telkomsel (under their prepaid service simPATI), premiered on Sunday, 10 April 2011 on Trans TV, airing six times a week. The Daily Show, which shows the activity of housemates, aired from Monday until Friday at 7 pm, and The Deportation Night, which shows who would be evicted, aired on Saturday at 7.30 pm. The host for the daily shows and the deportation night were Indra Herlambang and Sarah Sechan. There are 15 housemates, with Alan winning the first and only season.

During the show, one of the competitors, Luthfie, was disqualified for falsifying his background and identity. He was on the run on charges of embezzlement from Medan police, for which he was convicted and imprisoned for six months in September 2011.

== Format ==
Housemates are quarantined in the Big Brother House for more than 100 days with no contact to and from the outside world. Each week participants will compete in various challenges, which they must perform to make Big Brother satisfied. Each week, there will be a Captain (Head of Household) who is chosen by another housemates.

== Production ==
=== The house ===
The house is located on Trans TV Studio, beside the Trans Office Tower. The house's construction began in March 2011 and finished on 7 April 2011. More than 50 cameras are mounted in every part of the house. Every corner of the house is fitted with glass, except for the bathroom.

After filming, this house has been demolished and renovated into studio for Pagi - Pagi Ambyar and Brownis. Only stairs in this building retained.

=== Eye logo ===
Originally, Big Brother Indonesia is using the eye logo during a promotional teaser. However, this logo is later changed to word letter "Big Brother". The letter 'o' in 'Big Brother' is replaced by a camera lens, representing the show's format.

== Housemates ==
15 housemates entered the house on April 6, 2011.

| Name | Nickname | Age | Sex | Occupation | Hometown | Audition City | Day entered | Day exited | Result |
|---|---|---|---|---|---|---|---|---|---|
| Alan Wangsa Satria Pamungkas | Alan | 22 | M | Radio personality | Cianjur | Bandung | 1 | 164 | Winner |
| I Gede Derek Marshall | Derek | 30 | M | Human resource manager | Bali | Jakarta | 1 | 164 | Runner-up |
| Renata Novomestska | Rene | 24 | F | College student | Valašské Meziříčí | Bandung | 1 | 164 | Third place |
| Tengku Novi Yanti | Tengku | 22 | F | Umbrella Girl | Bandung | Bandung | 1 | 150 | Evicted |
| Shinta Shintyawati | Shinta | 22 | F | Fresh graduate | Bandung | Bandung | 1 | 129 | Evicted |
| Jenny | Jane | 25 | F | Model / Freelancer | Samarinda | Bandung | 1 | 105 | Evicted |
| M. Nur Patra Kamil | Patra | 25 | M | Employee / Model | Jakarta | Jakarta | 1 | 101 | Evicted |
| Afrie Afdillah | Afrie | 30 | M | Employee | Jakarta | Jakarta | 1 | 87 | Evicted |
| Boris Erwin Putra Simbolon (Note: Prior to the disqualification, Luthfie claimed his full name was Luthfie Fahlevi Siahaan; an ID card showing his purported name was shown in the weeks leading to his disqualification.) | Luthfie | 24 | M | Doctor (claimed) | Medan | Jakarta | 1 | 73 | Ejected |
| Maurice Balentina Tobing | Maurice | 25 | F | Employee | Medan | Jakarta | 1 | 59 | Evicted |
| Ade Herawati | Ade | 43 | F | Housewife | Surabaya | Surabaya | 1 | 45 | Evicted |
| Widiarto Adi Kusumo | Widi | 24 | M | College student/Model | Surabaya | Surabaya | 1 | 38 | Evicted |
| Dewi Puspitawati | Dey | 38 | F | Artist | Karawang | Bandung | 1 | 31 | Evicted |
| Asran Aga Shady | Aga | 21 | M | College student | Pekanbaru | Bandung | 1 | 24 | Evicted |
| Roy Porayouw | Roy | 34 | M | Businessman | Poso | Surabaya | 1 | 17 | Evicted |

== Weekly summary ==
| | Events | Competitions | Tasks |
|---|---|---|---|
| Week 1 | All of the Housemates entered the House on the Day 1; On Day 1, Roy became the first Captain (Head of Household).; On Day 4, all of the Housemates got 300 coins from Big Brother to buy the basic necessities for a week.; On Day 9, Shinta received a secret mission from Big Brother to make a surprise party for Afrie's birthday. Big Brother gave Shinta a hairdryer as the gift because she succeeded in the mission.; There was no eviction on this week, because Big Brother wanted the Housemates to know each other closer. | There were no competitions in the first week. | Waffle Tower; All of the Housemates must build a tower from pile of waffles. After build, they must keep it stand. Housemates were failed on this task. |
| Week 2 | On Day 9, the previous Captain, Roy, got a punishment from Big Brother because when he was still the Captain, many housemates doing violation. Big Brother told Roy to choose one of the housemates. Roy didn't know what will happen, so he chose Alan, which caused Alan to be jailed for 24 hours. Roy felt very guilty to Alan and he lost his spirit on the Big Brother house. Roy fell ill from this day.; On Day 10, Patra became the new Captain after most of the Housemates nominated him to be the new Captain.; On Day 14, Roy was rushed to a hospital due to his declining health.; Roy became the first Housemate evicted on Day 17. | Finding Coins in the Jungle; All of the housemates, one by one must find the coins in a haystack for buying the basic necessities. They found almost 350 blue coins and 10 red coins and use it to buy the basic necessities.; Heavy Rain; All of the housemates divided into 2 groups, Male group and Female group. They competed for being the last on the moving log. The challenge was they was rushed down by so much water from above. The winners are Luthfie (male) and Dey (female). They received a special gift from Big Brother, a private dinner party only for them. | Domino Effect; All of the Housemates divided into 2 groups. They should create a domino chain from objects which has given by Big Brother (all of the objects must be used without any residual). Although there were many constraints, but the Housemates were success on this task. |
| Week 3 | On Day 16, the previous Captain, Patra, got a punishment from Big Brother, because many considered that his leadership was terrible. Big Brother asked Patra who he think that cause of the failure of his leadership. At the first he said it was Dey, but he was totally confused and then judged Luthfie. Finally, both Patra and Luthfie must be jailed for 12 hours for the punishment.; On Day 18, Renata became the new Captain after defeated Aga in the game.; On Day 18, all of the Housemates got 400 coins to buy the basic necessities for a week.; On Day 20, The Rich and The Poor switched places.; On Day 22, all of the Housemates played the game "Who Am I".; Aga became the second Housemate evicted on Day 24. | Captain Game; all of the Housemates (except the previous Captain) joined the quiz game. The winner will be the new Captain. Renata became the winner of this quiz game after defeating Aga in the final round.; Fill and Plug the Gallon; all of the Housemates (except Captain) divided into 3 groups. Group 1 are Maurice, Luthfie, Aga, and Dey. Group 2 are Alan, Jane, Tengku, Shinta, and Ade. Group 3 are Derek, Widi, Afrie, and Patra. Two players from the group must plug the holes on the gallon while one player fill the water and another player answering the question to get the plug. Group with the fast time filling the water will be the winner. Group 3 was the winner with 5 minutes and 40 seconds. The winner got a gift that is playing PSP for 2 hours. Another groups which were lost got a punishment that is they must hold an egg whatever they do and wherever they are.; Matching the Socks; The Rich will tell the sock's identification and The Poor will find the sock. Captain as the referee decided to win The Poor, because The Rich said a wrong identification. The Poor as the winner got a gift from Big Brother to exchange position with The Rich. So The Poor now "The Rich" while The Rich became "The Poor".; Separate the Food; The Poor and The Rich must separate the food's necessities such as rice, soybin and nuts which has been mixed as one. Both of the groups won this game and got a gift from Big Brother so many delicious foods. | The Rich and The Poor; Housemates were divided into 2 groups. First group are Ade, Jane, Luthfie, Afrie, Patra, Maurice, and Shinta, they became "The Rich" while another group; Widi, Aga, Derek, Alan, Tengku, and Dey became "The Poor". For a week, "The Rich" will live on the house, while "The Poor" must live on the backyard. Both "The Rich" or "The Poor" cannot enter another group's area. "The Poor", if they wanna use the bathroom and the worship room, must requesting permission to "The Rich". "The Rich", if they wanna go to the smoking room and the storage room, they must requesting permission too. Even "The Poor"'s place was so pathetic, but they found so many red coins on the backyard (red coins can be used to buy personal's necessities). Captain are neutral on this task.; Miniature of Monas; The Poor and The Rich must build the miniature of Monumen Nasional using ice cream stick. The Rich build the foundation while The Poor build the top. |
| Week 4 | This week began with having some new alliances. The first alliance were Luthfie, Maurice, Patra, and Afrie against the other alliance such as Derek, Jane, Ade, Shinta, Tengku, and Widi who has dominate the house since the first week.; The previous Captain, Renata, didn't get any punishments, because ten housemates considered that her leadership was successful, while three other said that her leadership was failed.; On Day 24, Luthfie became the new Captain after winning 4 votes from another housemates.; On this week, housemates divided into 3 groups. Group 1 were Shinta, Ade, Jane, and Maurice. Group 2 were Renata, Dey, Widi, and Afrie. Group 3 were Derek, Alan, Tengku and Patra. This week they played all competitions and tasks together with their group.; On Day 26, to celebrate the National Education Day, all of the housemates must wear the Indonesian elementary school's costume during that day.; On Day 27, most of housemates; except Maurice, did some violations. The red coin holder, Patra and Shinta, spend their coins to buy some pizzas and ice cream. Housemates were not supposed to give what they buy to another housemates, but did so anyway; they attempted to hide when they eat the pizzas and ice cream, but Big Brother knew it. Luthfie as captain, Patra and Shinta as red coin holder, was jailed for 12 hours for that violation.; On Day 28, Afrie received a secret mission from Big Brother to become a deaf man and annoy the housemates. He was successful in doing so and received a prize of watching a football match between Real Madrid and Barcelona.; Two housemates celebrated their birthday on this week, Luthfie (Day 29) and Jane (Day 31).; Dey became the third housemate evicted on Day 31. | Ranking 1; The groups competed on quiz to become the first ranking. Group 3 as the winner won two red coins as the prize and Group 1 as the runner-up won a red coin as the prize. Group 2 didn't get anything because they were lost.; Simpati Games I: Finding simPATI; The groups competed to find the word "simPATI" (the sponsor of the program) on a big kapok pool. Group 2, as the winner, won Rp 10.000.000 ($1000).; Candy Pulley; The groups competed to relay a candy from one to the others. Group 2, as the winner, won a phone call to home. | Performing Arts; The groups must make a unique performing arts. Each groups must have a different performing arts. On Da 30, Group 1 performed Cheerleaders, Group 2 performed Pantomime Show, and Group 3 performed Parody of Musical Theater. The performing arts held on the backyard and judged by Rudy Wowor (dancer), Ruben Onsu (comedian), and Audy (singer). They were successful on this task.; Egg Tower; The groups must build a tower from an egg and pipes and then keep it standing for 15 minutes. They failed on this task, because Group 3 can't keep the tower stand for 15 minutes. |
| Week 5 | Luthfie, the previous Captain, didn't get any punishments because all housemates, except Patra, considered that his leadership was successful. After exit from Big Brother House, Luthfie will get Rp 5.000.000,- ($500) for his success.; There was a new rule on this week. Captain has the right to nominate one of the housemates for become the nomination with no exception. Captain will tell his nomination directly in front of the housemates.; On Day 31, Derek became the new Captain after winning 12 votes, defeated Alan who won 8 votes.; Most of the housemates (except Renata, Maurice, Luthfie and Shinta), did so many violations on the weekly task "Injak Karpet". They did almost 31 violations, whether intentional or not. Because of that violations, Big Brother decrease their blue coins from 400 pieces to 155 pieces.; On Day 36, Renata got a secret mission from Big Brother. She must get a hug from two female housemates without being asked by them. She was successful and awarded 3 red coins. Besides Renata, Luthfie won five red coins after becoming the fastest to pick up the Surprise Call from simPATI.; Widi became the fourth Housemate evicted on Day 38. | Ping Pong Pinggang (Hips Ping Pong); Housemates must wiggle their hips to release the ping pong balls from the tissue box that placed on their hips. Luthfie became the winner after beating Jane on the final round. As the winner, he got a prize to eat whatever he want for his dinner.; Coins on Stocking; Housemates, with their own pair, must release the coins that stored in a stocking with just one hand. The pair Maurice and Tengku won this competition after beating Derek and Widi on the final round. As the winner, they were awarded two red coins.; Simpati Games II: Putting The Water Into The Tube; Housemates must put colored water into a tube as much as possible while going through a slippery course. Derek won the game, earning him 5 red coins and Rp 5.000.000 ($500) | Injak Karpet (Step on the Carpet); This week, housemates were divided into four groups, White Group (Renata, Maurice, Luthfie), Red Group (Derek, Jane, Afrie), Green Group (Widi, Patra, Shinta), and Blue Group (Alan, Tengku, Ade). Each groups received five carpets for three housemates from Big Brother. Housemates must step on the carpet everywhere they move and everywhere they are, except on Big Brother Room. Every violation they did will decrease their blue coins (which is used for buying the basic necessities). Housemates did so many violations on this task. |
| Week 6 | Derek, the previous Captain, got a punishment because six out of ten housemates voted that he failed. He must be jailed for about 12 hours for the punishment.; On Day 38, Alan became the new Captain after being chosen by Luthfie who became the fastest to pick up the Surprise Call from Big Brother.; On Day 41, Big Brother announced a new power, The Power of Veto. All housemates except the nominations will compete to win The Power of Veto. The Veto holder could save one of the nominees and then put another housemates to the nominations.; Luthfie, as The Veto holder, saved Jane from the nominations and put Renata into the nomination.; On Day 41, Captain Alan was given a task by Big Brother. He must train a parrot named Rafael to say "Big Brother" within 3 days.; Ade became the fifth Housemate evicted on Day 45. | POV: Throw the Coconuts; Housemates, except the nominees, must throw coconuts into the right squares according to their color. Luthfie won the very first Power of Veto.; Mini Labyrinth; Housemates, with their own pair, compete to move the ball on a mini labyrinth without falling into the holes. Patra and Ade won this competition and awarded a special dinner. | Farming; Housemates should take care of goats and chickens which was given by Big Brother. Each goats and chickens which has a stable weight, then Housemates awarded 30 blue coins by Big Brother. |
| Week 7 | Alan, the previous Captain, didn't get any punishments because all housemates voted that he was successful.; On Day 45, Shinta became the new Captain after beating Afrie by a vote 7–6.; Derek, as The Veto holder, saved Renata from the nominations and put Maurice into the nomination.; No Housemate was evicted this week. | POV: Arrange the Picture; Housemates, except the nominees, must arrange the pictures which are located on the living room as fast as they can. Derek won the Power of Veto.; Mystery Ball; Housemates must choose one of three balls, Blue Balls (Reward: Blue Coins), Red Balls (Reward: Red Coins), and Mystery Balls. Only Patra, Shinta and Maurice who picked the mystery balls. As the rewards, Patra could steal Afrie's red coins, Shinta got two chickens, while Maurice must be jailed with Renata. | Traditional Week; Housemates were divided into three ethnic groups, Melayu (Afrie, Jane, Luthfie), Madura (Derek, Alan, Renata), Betawi (Patra, Maurice, Tengku). On this week, those ethnic groups must wear traditional costume, use vernacular based on their ethnic groups, practice their abilities in making Batik, and cook based on their ethnic groups. Melayu group became the winner in cooking competition. |
| Week 8 | Shinta, the previous Captain, didn't get any punishments because all housemates voted that she was successful.; On Day 52, Tengku became the new Captain after picked a different hat than what another housemates pick.; Big Brother changed the Power of Veto's competition rule. Each nominees will choose a housemate to represent them in the competition. If their choice win the competition, the nominees would directly safe. Then, the nominees could put another housemates to replace them in the nomination.; Jane and Luthfie, as the Veto holder, put Patra and Derek into the nomination.; Maurice became the sixth Housemate evicted on Day 59. | POV: Big Brother's Hockey; Jane picked Afrie, Luthfie picked Renata, and Maurice picked Derek to play in the POV Competition. They must flick the "hockey ball" with their fingers to the red sign as close as they can. Renata won this competition, so Luthfie was saved but he didn't win the POV, because the rule said that the loser is the winner. Afrie lost, so Jane won the Power of Veto. | Big Brother's Boot Camp; This week, housemates got a very hard army training from Big Brother, which could test them mentally and physically. |
| Week 9 | Tengku, the previous Captain, didn't get any punishments because all housemates voted that she was successful.; On Day 60, Afrie became the new Captain after beating Jane in Captain Game.; There was no eviction on this week. | Captain Game, Afrie and Jane, who had never been Captains since the first week, compete in this game. They should throw bracelet into a cone. Afrie won this game and become the new Captain, while Jane, who lost in this game, will be the next Captain for two consecutive weeks. | Theme: Pirates; Group: Alis Nukik; Alan as the leader, Derek, Tengku, Jane. Jenggot Hitam; Renata as the leader, Shinta, Patra, Luthfie andri. |

== Nominations table ==
Each week, housemates are instructed to nominate two fellow housemates for eviction. Housemates may not nominate themselves or the Captain (as the Captain has an immune from eviction) for eviction. Three housemates that received the most nominations will be nominated for the eviction, decided by text message votes by the general public. The housemate with the most votes will be evicted. From the final round, the housemate with the lowest votes will be evicted.

| | Week 1 | Week 2 | Week 3 | Week 4 | Week 5 | Week 6 | Week 7 | Week 8 | Week 9 | Week 10 | Week 11 | Week 13 | Week 15 | Week 17 | Week 19 | Week 23 Final | | Nominations received |
|---|---|---|---|---|---|---|---|---|---|---|---|---|---|---|---|---|---|---|
| House Captain | Roy | Patra | Rene | Luthfie | Derek | Alan | Shinta | Tengku | Afrie | Jane | Jane | Tengku | None | | | | | Nominations received |
| Captain's Nomination | None | | | | Widi | Ade | Luthfie | Luthfie | Patra | Rene | Alan; Afrie | Jane | None | | | | | Nominations received |
| Alan | No; Nomination | Jane; Widi | Luthfie; Aga | Maurice; Widi | Luthfie; Jane | House; Captain | Rene; Jane | Derek; Jane | Luthfie; Rene | Shinta; Luthfie | Shinta; Derek | Patra | Derek; Jane | Rene | Derek | Winner (Day 164) | | 11 |
| Derek | No; Nomination | Ade; Dey | Luthfie; Dey | Dey; Patra | House; Captain | Patra; Maurice | Rene; Maurice | Maurice; Alan | Luthfie; Tengku | Shinta; Luthfie | Alan; Afrie | Not; Eligible | Alan; Tengku | Tengku; Alan | Tengku | Runner-up (Day 164) | | 25 |
| Rene | No; Nomination | Luthfie; Roy | Aga; Luthfie | Patra; Afrie | Patra; Afrie | Ade; Afrie | Jane; Patra | Afrie; Maurice | Luthfie; Shinta | Shinta; Luthfie | Shinta; Afrie | Nominated | Derek; Shinta | Derek; Shinta | Derek | Third place (Day 164) | | 41 |
| Tengku | No; Nomination | Roy; Aga | Aga; Dey | Patra; Maurice | Jane; Maurice | Derek; Jane | Derek; Jane | House; Captain | Luthfie; Rene | Shinta; Luthfie | Shinta; Derek | House; Captain | Derek; Jane | Derek; Shinta | Derek | Evicted (Day 150) | | 9 |
| Shinta | No; Nomination | Luthfie; Ade | Aga; Luthfie | Patra; Maurice | Patra; Maurice | Patra; Maurice | House; Captain | Patra; Maurice | Luthfie; Rene | Rene; Luthfie | Rene; Patra | Rene | Derek; Rene | Derek; Tengku | Rene | Evicted (Day 129) | | 22 |
| Jane | No; Nomination | Alan; Roy | Luthfie; Afrie | Patra; Afrie | Patra; Alan | Patra; Maurice | Rene; Maurice | Maurice; Alan | Luthfie; Shinta | House; Captain | House; Captain | Nominated | Alan; Tengku | Evicted (Day 115) | | | | 28 |
| Patra | No; Nomination | Ade; Roy | Aga; Dey | Dey; Widi | Jane; Ade | Jane; Shinta | Rene; Jane | Rene; Jane | Rene; Shinta | Shinta; Luthfie | Tengku; Alan | Nominated | Evicted (Day 101) | | | | | 23 |
| Afrie | No; Nomination | Luthfie; Ade | Luthfie; Ade | Derek; Ade | Ade; Luthfie | Ade; Shinta | Rene; Jane | Maurice; Shinta | House; Captain | Rene; Luthfie | Shinta; Rene | Evicted (Day 87) | | | | | | 13 |
| Luthfie | No; Nomination | Ade; Tengku | Jane; Tengku | Jane; Derek | Patra; Alan | Derek; Jane | Derek; Jane | Derek; Jane | Rene; Patra | Shinta; Rene | Ejected (Day 73) | | | | | | | 12 |
| Maurice | No; Nomination | Afrie; Shinta | Shinta; Afrie | Jane; Shinta | Jane; Shinta | Derek; Jane | Derek; Jane | Derek; Jane | Evicted (Day 59) | | | | | | | | | 17 |
| Ade | No; Nomination | Jane; Afrie | Luthfie; Dey | Patra; Dey | Patra; Maurice | Derek; Patra | Evicted (Day 45) | | | | | | | | | | | 15 |
| Widi | No; Nomination | Luthfie; Ade | Aga; Luthfie | Patra; Maurice | Afrie; Alan | Evicted (Day 38) | | | | | | | | | | | | 5 |
| Dey | No; Nomination | Roy; Ade | Luthfie; Jane | Patra; Derek | Evicted (Day 31) | | | | | | | | | | | | | 8 |
| Aga | No; Nomination | Luthfie; Ade | Widi; Ade | Evicted (Day 24) | | | | | | | | | | | | | | 7 |
| Roy | House; Captain | Luthfie; Ade | Evicted (Day 17) | | | | | | | | | | | | | | | 5 |
| Notes | ^{1} | none | ^{2} | none | ^{3} | none | ^{4} | none | ^{5} | ^{6} ^{7} | ^{8} ^{9} ^{10} | ^{10} | ^{10} | ^{10} | ^{10} ^{11} | none | | |
| Nominated (pre-veto) | None | Ade; Rene; Roy | Jane; Aga; Dey | Rene; Maurice; Dey; Derek | Widi; Rene; Jane | Rene; Derek; Jane; Ade | Jane; Rene; Luthfie | Maurice; Jane; Luthfie | Luthfie; Rene; Patra | Luthfie; Shinta; Rene | Shinta; Rene; Afrie | Patra; Rene; Jane | Derek; Alan; Tengku; Jane | Derek; Tengku; Shinta; Rene | Derek; Tengku; Rene | Derek; Alan; Rene | | |
| Power of veto | None | None | | | | Luthfie | Derek | Luthfie; Jane | None | Shinta; Luthfie | None | | Alan | Tengku | None | | | |
| Nominated for Eviction (post-veto) | None | None | | | | Rene; Derek; Ade; Rene | Jane; Rene; Maurice | Maurice; Rene; Derek | None | Luthfie; Rene; Patra | None | | Rene; Tengku; Jane | Derek; Shinta; Rene | None | | | |
| Ejected | None | | | | | | | | | Luthfie | None | | | | | | | |
| Evicted | No; Eviction | Roy; Fewest votes to save | Aga; Fewest votes to save | Dey; Fewest votes to save | Widi; Fewest votes to save | Ade; Fewest votes to save | Eviction; Cancelled | Maurice; Fewest votes to save | Eviction; Cancelled | Eviction; Cancelled | Afrie; Fewest votes to save | Patra; Fewest votes to save | Jane; 25.75% to save | Shinta; 30.9% to save | Tengku; 30.26% to save | Rene; 17.32% to win | Derek; 40.5% to win | |
| Evicted | No; Eviction | Roy; Fewest votes to save | Aga; Fewest votes to save | Dey; Fewest votes to save | Widi; Fewest votes to save | Ade; Fewest votes to save | Eviction; Cancelled | Maurice; Fewest votes to save | Eviction; Cancelled | Eviction; Cancelled | Afrie; Fewest votes to save | Patra; Fewest votes to save | Jane; 25.75% to save | Shinta; 30.9% to save | Tengku; 30.26% to save | Alan; 42.18% to win | | |

=== Notes ===
^1: There was no eviction in the first week, because Big Brother wanted the housemates to know each other closer.
^2: Because of a tie between Dey and Derek with three nomination votes, there were four nominations on week 4.
^3: From this week onwards, a rule change was made where the Captain has the right to nominate one of the housemates for become the nomination with no exception.
^4: The producers decided to cancel the eviction and void the nominations on the seventh week. No reason was given for this decision.
^5: The producers decided to cancel the eviction again on the ninth week. No reason was given for this decision.
^6: Due to the ejection of Luthfie, the eviction process was cancelled on the tenth week.
^7: Luthfie was ejected from Big Brother House on the tenth week due to lying to the production team about his identity and background.
^8: Captain must choose two Housemates between Alan, Afrie, Derek, or Rene for nomination.
^9: There was no eviction on the eleventh week.
^10: Eviction was changed to be once in two weeks.
^11: On the night Shinta was evicted, Shinta could choose a Housemate to be automatically nominated; she chose Rene.

=== Nominations total received ===
| | Week 2 | Week 3 | Week 4 | Week 5 | Week 6 | Week 7 | Week 8 | Week 9 | Week 10 | Week 11 | Week 13 | Week 15 | Week 17 | Week 19 | Final | Total |
|---|---|---|---|---|---|---|---|---|---|---|---|---|---|---|---|---|
| Alan | 1 | 0 | 0 | 3 | 0 | 0 | 2 | 0 | 0 | 3 | 0 | 2 | 1 | 0 | Winner | 12 |
| Derek | 0 | 0 | 3 | 0 | 4 | 3 | 3 | 0 | 0 | 2 | 0 | 4 | 3 | 3 | Runner-up | 21 |
| Rene | 0 | 0 | 0 | 0 | 0 | 5 | 1 | 5 | 4 | 2 | 1 | 1 | 1 | 1 | Third place | 7 |
| Tengku | 1 | 1 | 0 | 0 | 0 | 0 | 0 | 1 | 0 | 1 | 0 | 2 | 2 | 1 | Evicted | 8 |
| Shinta | 1 | 1 | 1 | 1 | 2 | 0 | 1 | 3 | 6 | 4 | 0 | 1 | 2 | Evicted | | 14 |
| Jane | 2 | 2 | 2 | 4 | 4 | 7 | 4 | 0 | 0 | 0 | 1 | 2 | Evicted | | | 22 |
| Patra | 0 | 0 | 8 | 5 | 4 | 1 | 1 | 2 | 0 | 1 | 1 | Evicted | | | | 20 |
| Afrie | 2 | 2 | 2 | 2 | 1 | 0 | 1 | 1 | 0 | 3 | Evicted | | | | | 13 |
| Luthfie | 6 | 9 | 0 | 2 | 0 | 1 | 1 | 6 | 7 | Ejected | | | | | | 18 |
| Maurice | 0 | 0 | 4 | 3 | 3 | 2 | 5 | Evicted | | | | | | | | 15 |
| Ade | 9 | 2 | 1 | 2 | 3 | Evicted | | | | | | | | | | 17 |
| Widi | 1 | 1 | 2 | 1 | Evicted | | | | | | | | | | | 5 |
| Dey | 1 | 4 | 3 | Evicted | | | | | | | | | | | | 8 |
| Aga | 1 | 6 | Evicted | | | | | | | | | | | | | 7 |
| Roy | 5 | Evicted | | | | | | | | | | | | | | 5 |
