= Bigg Boss 8 =

Bigg Boss 8 is the eighth season of various versions of Bigg Boss (an Indian adaptation of the reality game show Big Brother):

- Bigg Boss (Hindi season 8)
- Bigg Boss Kannada (season 8)
- Bigg Boss (Tamil season 8)
- Bigg Boss (Telugu season 8)
- Bigg Boss (Malayalam season 8)

== See also ==
- Big Brother 8 (disambiguation)
- Bigg Boss (disambiguation)
- Bigg Boss 7 (disambiguation)
- Bigg Boss 9 (disambiguation)
- BB8 (disambiguation)
