= BB7 =

BB7 can refer to:

- BB7, a postcode district in the BB postcode area
- Avid BB7, a mechanical disc brake system for bicycles manufactured by SRAM Corporation
- Big Brother 7 (disambiguation), a television programme in various versions
  - Bigg Boss 7 (disambiguation), Indian versions of the TV franchise
