= BB8 =

BB8 may refer to:

- BB8, a postcode district in the BB postcode area around Blackburn, United Kingdom
- BB-8, a fictional robot from the Star Wars films
- BB8 is the name of a self driving car prototype from Nvidia as presented on CES 2017
- Black Brant 8, a Canadian sounding rocket
- USS Alabama (BB-8), a United States Navy pre-dreadnought battleship commissioned in 1900 and scrapped in 1924
- Bb8, a chess move notation

== See also ==
- Big Brother 8 (disambiguation)
  - Bigg Boss 8 (disambiguation), Indian versions of the TV franchise
