= Church of the Holy Apostle Luke, Kupinovo =

Serbian Orthodox church in Vojvodina, Serbia

Church of the Holy Apostle Luke
- Црква светог Луке; Crkva svetog Luke
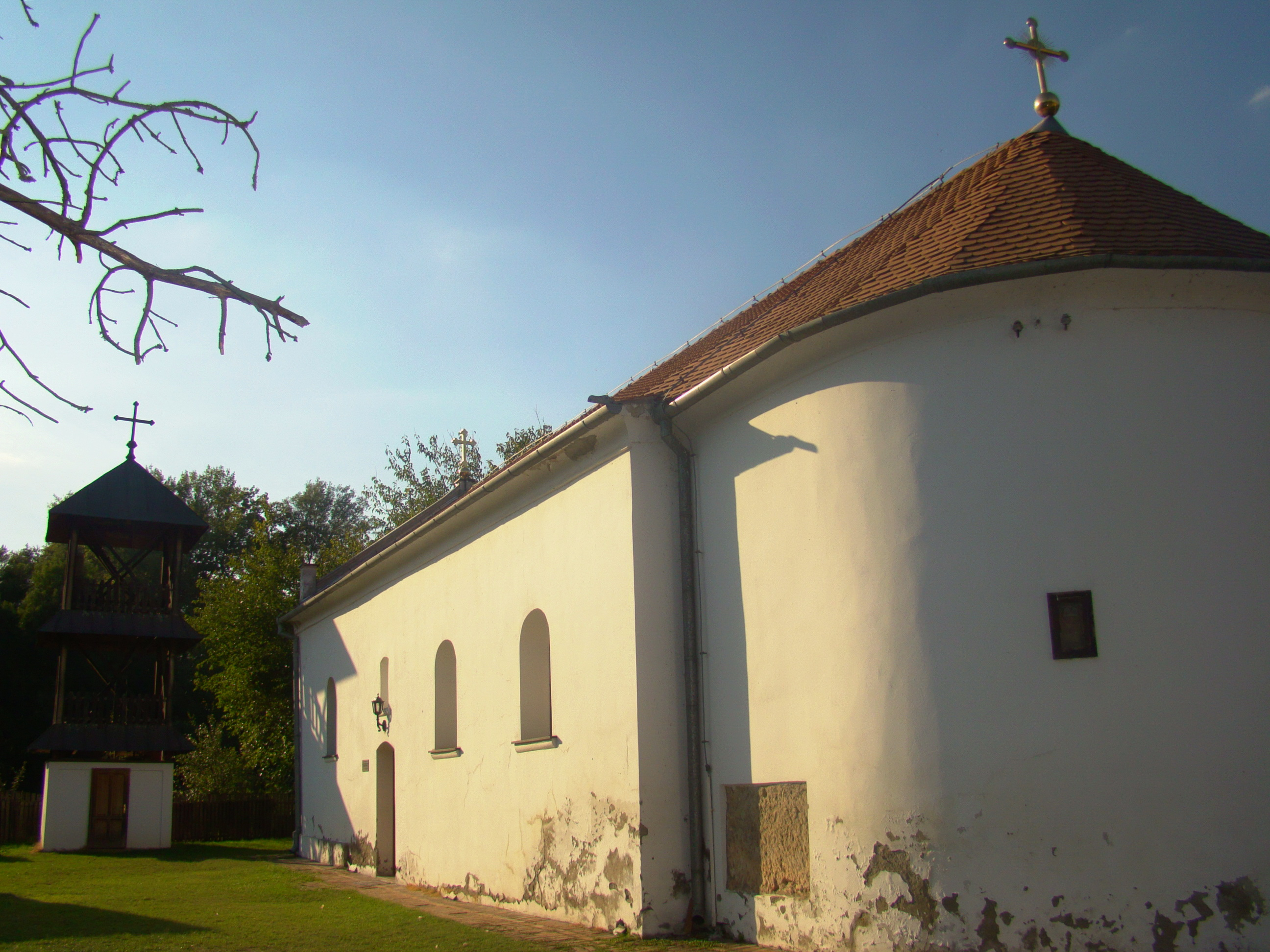
- Church of the Holy Apostle Luke

- Shown within Vojvodina/Serbia Church of the Holy Apostle Luke (Serbia)
- 44°42′09″N 20°02′59″E
- Location: Kupinovo, Vojvodina

Cultural Heritage of Serbia
- Type: Immovable Cultural Heritage of Exceptional Importance
- Designated: 22 December 1993
- Reference no.: СК 1044
- Country: Serbia
- Denomination: Serbian Orthodox

History
- Status: Church
- Dedication: Luke the Evangelist

Architecture
- Functional status: Active
- Years built: 1450-1455

Administration
- Archdiocese: Eparchy of Srem

Church of the Holy Apostle Luke (Serbian: Црква светог Луке) in Kupinovo is a Serbian Orthodox church in Vojvodina, Serbia. It is the oldest preserved Eastern Orthodox church in Vojvodina. Built in the mid-15th century by Despot Đurađ Branković, the church is primarily significant for its historical and documentary value and holds the status of a Immovable Cultural Heritage of Exceptional Importance (identifier no. SK 1044).

The church is mentioned in 1486 and 1502 as the burial site of the Syrmian despots Stefan and Jovan Branković. It was devastated and abandoned in 1502 following the Ottoman conquest of Syrmia and was restored twice, at the beginning of the 18th century and the end of the 19th century. Despite the vicissitudes of history, the church has retained its original structure intact.

The modest architectural unit of the church is a single-nave building with massive stone and brick walls, now entirely covered with a flat wooden ceiling. The deep altar apse, as wide as the nave, has a semicircular shape, while an arcade separates the nave from the narthex. Research on the building's structure has determined that it has not undergone major changes throughout its existence. The church's richly carved Baroque iconostasis, created before 1780, completely encloses the space between the nave and the altar. It was painted in 1729 in the Baroque manner, with a Rococo palette, and according to more recent analogies, it is the work of Jakov Orfelin from the 1790s.

== See also ==
- Eparchy of Srem
