= Big Brother VIP (Serbian TV series) season 3 =

Big Brother VIP
- Season 3
- Presented by: Marijana Mićić; Milan Kalinić
- No. of days: 29
- No. of housemates: 15
- Winner: Miki Đuričić
- Runner-up: Dalibor Andonov
- Participating countries: Serbia; Bosnia and Herzegovina; Montenegro

Release
- Original network: B92; Pink BH; Pink M
- Original release: 9 March – 6 April 2009

Season chronology
- ← Previous; Season 2 Next → Season 4

Veliki Brat VIP All Stars was the third season of the regional celebrity version of Veliki Brat. The show started airing on 9 March 2009, and finished on 6 April 2009.

It was aired on three television channels in three countries: Pink in Serbia, Pink BH in Bosnia-Herzegovina, and Pink M in Montenegro.

Celebrities from Serbia, Bosnia and Herzegovina and Montenegro competed for €50,000. The hosts of the show were Milan Kalinić and Marijana Mićić.

== Housemates ==
Name	Age on entry	Famous for...	Day entered	Day exited	Status
Miroslav "Miki" Đuričić	31	Reality TV personality	1	29	Winner
Dalibor Andonov "Gru"†	36	Rapper	1	29	Runner-up
Filip Kapisoda†	21	Model	1	29	3rd Place
Dragan Marinković "Maca"	40	Actor and showman	1	29	4th Place
Mira Škorić	38	Singer	1	29	5th Place
Tijana Stajšić	24	Model	1	28	Evicted
Ivana Škorić	31	Model	1	28	Evicted
Mia Borisavljević	24	Singer	1	28	Evicted
Edin Aladžuz "Kalimero"	29	Comedian	1	26	Evicted
Milić Vukašinović	59	Musician and reality TV personality	15	22	Evicted
Sani Armani/Sandra Drašković	28	TV presenter	1	16	Evicted
Milan Mumin	37	Rock musician	1	15	Evicted
Nenad Čanak	49	Politician	1	9	Walked
Jelena Žeželj	21	Model, housemate on Veliki Brat 2007	1	8	Evicted
Jelena Karleuša	30	Singer	1	2	Walked

== Review ==
- Jelena Karleuša entered the Veliki Brat house only as a special guest star and left after 24 hours.
- Only 3 housemates have already been in the Veliki Brat house. They are Jelena Žeželj (she was in the second season of Veliki Brat), Miki Đuričić (he was in the house in the first and in the second season of Veliki Brat) and Dragan Marinković Maca (he was in the first season of VIP Veliki Brat).
- Nenad Čanak, politician from Novi Sad, left the house on Day 9 due to his duties as a politician. Čanak later refused to get back to the house.
- Milić Vukašinović entered the house on Day 15. He had already been in the house in the second season of Veliki Brat VIP.
- Miki had a secret task in the first week in the house. He had to nominate 5 housemates, they were Jelena Zezelj, Mira Skoric, Nenad Čanak, Ivana Škoric and Sandra Draškovic. The housemates saved Sandra, Ivana and Mira from eviction.
- On the Day 15 Milan Mumin was evicted. One day later (Day 16) Big Brother surprised all the housemates by organising public nominations. Maca didn't wanted to nominate anybody, so he was nominated automatically nominated. Housemates nominated Miki and Tijana. Sandra broke the rule by talking about nominations, and as a result, was also automatically nominated. Sandra Drašković (Sani Armani) was evicted.
- Housemates nominated Milić Vukasinović, Tijana and Kalimero. Kalimero received the most votes for eviction on forums. On the second place was Tijana and the fewest votes had Milić. On Monday night Milić was evicted.
- Big Brother organised unexpected nominations. Housemates nominated Gru, Tijana and Kalimero. One of them would be evicted on next Friday. Kalimero was evicted.
- There are 8 remaining housemates who became finalists. They are: Filip, Tijana, Maca, Mia, Miki, Ivana, Gru and Mira.
- On the semifinal night Mia received the fewest votes to win, therefore evicted. At the same time Ivana was evicted too. An hour after, Tijana was evicted. Mira, Gru, Miki, Maca and Filip were the last in the house.

== Nominations table ==
	Day 7	Day 13	Day 16	Day 20	Day 24	Day 29 Final	
Miki	Ivana; Jelena Z Mira; Nenad; Sani	Sani; Mira	Sani; Mira	Milić; Mia	Mira; Ivana	Winner (Day 29)	
Gru	Ivana; Ivana to save	Milan; Miki	Kalimero; Miki	Maca; Filip	Maca; Kalimero	Runner-Up (Day 29)	
Filip	Mira; Ivana to save	Milan; Kalimero	Miki; Kalimero	Gru; Kalimero	Gru; Kalimero	Third Place (Day 29)	
Maca	Sani to save	Kalimero; Gru	Refused	Gru; Kalimero	Gru; Tijana	Fourth Place (Day 29)	
Mira	Saved	Milan; Miki	Miki; Tijana	Tijana; Miki	Miki; Tijana	Fifth Place (Day 29)	
Tijana	Jelena Z Jelena Z to save	Sani; Mira	Sani; Mira	Mira; Kalimero	Mira; Kalimero	Evicted (Day 28)	
Ivana	Saved	Miki; Milan	Miki; Tijana	Tijana; Kalimero	Tijana; Kalimero	Evicted (Day 28)	
Mia	Sani; Ivana to save	Miki; Milan	Miki; Tijana	Tijana; Milić	Tijana; Gru	Evicted (Day 28)	
Kalimero	Mira; Ivana to save	Miki; Milan	Miki; Tijana	Milic; Filip	Tijana; Gru	Evicted (Day 26)	
Milić	Not in House		Kalimero; Miki	Miki; Kalimero	Evicted (Day 21)		
Sani	Saved	Miki; Milan	Banned	Evicted (Day 16)			
Milan	Nenad; Nenad to save	Mira; Maca	Evicted (Day 15)				
Nenad	Nominated	Walked (Day 9)					
Jelena Z	Nominated	Evicted (Day 8)					
Jelena K	Walked (Day 2)						
Notes	^{1}	none	^{2}	none			
Up for Eviction	Jelena Z Nenad	Milan; Miki	Maca; Miki; Sani; Tijana	Kalimero; Milić; Tijana	Gru; Kalimero; Tijana	Filip; Gru; Ivana; Maca; Mia; Miki; Mira; Tijana	
Walked	Jelena K Nenad	none					
Evicted	Jelena Z 63.5% to evict	Milan; 61.7% to evict	Sani; 74.2% to evict	Milić; 43.0% to evict	Kalimero; 57.3% to evict	Mia; 0.3% (out of 8)	Ivana; 0.4% (out of 8)
Evicted	Jelena Z 63.5% to evict	Milan; 61.7% to evict	Sani; 74.2% to evict	Milić; 43.0% to evict	Kalimero; 57.3% to evict	Tijana; Fewest votes (out of 6)	Mira; Fewest votes (out of 5)
Evicted	Jelena Z 63.5% to evict	Milan; 61.7% to evict	Sani; 74.2% to evict	Milić; 43.0% to evict	Kalimero; 57.3% to evict	Maca; Fewest votes (out of 4)	Filip; Fewest votes (out of 3)
Evicted	Jelena Z 63.5% to evict	Milan; 61.7% to evict	Sani; 74.2% to evict	Milić; 43.0% to evict	Kalimero; 57.3% to evict	Gru; 15.6% (out of 2)	
Saved	Nenad; 36.5%	Miki; 38.3%	Maca; 14.8% Tijana; 7.4% Miki; 3.6%	Kalimero; 33.7% Tijana; 23.3%	Tijana; 32.5% Gru; 10.2%	Miki; 84.4% to win	

== Notes ==
- ^1 Miki was immune as he is the current Head of House and was the only housemate allowed to nominate. Next the remaining housemates voted to save 3 of the potential nominees. As there was a tie, a second round of voting took place between the tied housemates. Maca was not required to vote in the 2nd round as the result was no longer in doubt.
- ^2 Maca refused to nominate and was automatically nominated by Veliki Brat. Sani was automatically nominated by Veliki Brat as punishment for discussing nominations
