= Big Brother (Serbian TV series) season 2 =

Big Brother
- Season 2
- The 2007 logo, which is based on the concurrent British version.
- Presented by: Ana Mihajlovski; Marina Miščević Trifunović; Irina Vukotić
- No. of days: 99
- No. of housemates: 22
- Winners: Ex aequo when abandoned: Aleksandar Kocić, Živan "Burek" Janićijević, Đorđe Stojanović, Nataša Ilić, Suzana Pavlović, Vesko Bošković, Vesna Milovać
- Participating countries: Serbia; Bosnia and Herzegovina; Montenegro

Release
- Original network: B92; Pink BH; Pink M
- Original release: 22 September – 29 December 2007

Season chronology
- Next → Season 3

Veliki Brat 2007 is the second season of the television reality show Veliki Brat, the Serbian, Bosnian and Montenegrin joint version of Big Brother.

The second season started on 22 September 2007 and was supposed to run until its scheduled finale on 5 January 2008, however, immediately following the death of three of the evicted housemates—Stevan Zečević, Zorica Lazić and Elmir Kuduzović, the producers of the show, Emotion and B92, decided to abandon the competition on 29 December 2007, a week before the planned finale.

On 29 December, the producers called off the tournament out of respect to the three former players, which first led to the seven remaining players leaving the Veliki Brat house, and then the broadcast that night announced the abandonment of the tournament. All seven players split the winner's prize money together. After the statement, archive footage of the three deceased former housemates was shown.

There were no statements on what would be done with the amount of €20,000 earned by two housemates as a part of their on-air secret tasks. This amount was supposed to be given as a humanitarian donation to charity organizations or individuals in need.

== Car accident ==
Contestants Elmir Kuduzović, Zorica Lazić and Stevan Zečević. They were involved in a car accident and were instantly killed.

On 28 December 2007, Stevan Zečević, Zorica Lazić and Elmir Kuduzović, who had all been evicted earlier in the season, were killed in a car crash. The crash occurred when their Citroën C4, driven by Kuduzović, ran off the road near the town of Ušće, Serbia. The car reportedly skidded off the road due to excessive speed on a turn, flipped onto its roof and landed in the Vukodraž River. The crash happened on Obrenovac-Šabac road, which was icy at the time. A fourth person in the car, Vladimir Sarić, who was not a member of this season's cast, was injured in the crash. Another car carrying fellow evicted housemates, Tanja Obradović and Jelena Žeželj, was also traveling in front of them at the time but was not involved in the crash. Stevan Zečević was born in 1983 and was from Novi Sad, Serbia. Zorica Lazić was also born in 1983 and was from Zemun, a city near Belgrade. Elmir Kuduzović came from the city of Tuzla in Bosnia and Herzegovina, and was born in 1981.

All five housemates in the two vehicles were en route to an official appearance on behalf of the production company to promote the planned upcoming season finale of the program. The remaining Veliki Brat housemates were informed of the deaths off-camera.

Serbian television station B92 and production company Emotion announced in a press statement issued on 29 December that they had decided to end the season early due to the tragic deaths of Zečević, Lazić and Kuduzović. The show had been previously scheduled to end its season on 5 January 2008. All five former housemates had been scheduled to return to the Veliki Brat house on New Year's Eve as part of the season finale.

The abandonment was reportedly the second time that a Big Brother season had been cancelled anywhere in the world. The first being Big Brother: The Boss, the Arabian version of Big Brother. In 2020, two worldwide versions of Big Brother were abandoned mid-season when the second season of the Bigg Boss Malayalam in India and the eighth season of Big Brother Canada ended because of COVID-19 pandemic restrictions in India and Canada. In May 2021, the eighth season of the Kannada language version of Bigg Boss in India was suspended for the same reason; after a two-month suspension, production resumed July 2021 with the sub-title "Second Innings."

== Housemates ==
Nine housemates entered the house on launch night. A week later on day seven, five more entered the house. On day thirty five Miroslav, who took part in the first season but decided to quit after fifteen days entered the house. Out of 22 total housemates, 17 were from Serbia, 3 from Bosnia and Herzegovina and 2 from Montenegro.

Housemate	Age on entry	Residence	Day entered	Day exited	Status
Aleksandar Kocić	26	Vranje	39	99	Show discontinued (Note: Former Housemates, Stevan Zečević, Zorica Lazić and Elmir Kuduzović, were involved in a tragic car accident in the evening on 28 December 2007. Production decided to stop the season broadcast on 29 December 2007, the 99th day inside the House. The €100,000 prize was split equally between the seven remaining Housemates who left the House during the afternoon on Day 99. The finale was originally scheduled to air on 5 January 2008. Funds from the final televote were donated to a traffic safety campaign.)
Živan "Burek" Janićijević	26	Sočanica	84	99	Show discontinued
Živan "Burek" Janićijević	26	Sočanica	1	28	Evicted
Đorđe Stojanović	29	Velika Plana	39	99	Show discontinued
Nataša Ilić	26	Niš	1	99	Show discontinued
Suzana Pavlović	22	Smederevo	1	99	Show discontinued
Vesko Bošković	42	Nikšić, Montenegro	60	99	Show discontinued
Vesna Milovac	27	Novi Sad	39	99	Show discontinued
Dijana Mićić	21	Bijeljina, Bosnia and Herzegovina	1	91	Evicted
Danilo Tomić	29	Užice	84	89	Walked
Danilo Tomić	29	Užice	7	14	Evicted
Mirko Đuričić (Note: Mirko is the father of Miki.)	56	Kupinovo	70	80	Evicted
Marina Ignjatović	31	Šabac	1	77	Evicted
Miroslav "Miki" Đuričić (Note: Miroslav "Miki" Đuričić previously participated on the first season of Veliki Brat, where he finished in 17th place after walking out of the House.)	30	Kupinovo	35	75	Walked
Stevan Zečević	23	Novi Sad	56	70	Evicted
Stevan Zečević	23	Novi Sad	7	21	Evicted
Zorica Lazić	24	Zemun	39	63	Evicted
Slaviša Lakić	29	Prijedor, Bosnia and Herzegovina	7	56	Evicted
Miloš "Mićko" Novaković	28	Podgorica, Montenegro	7	51	Walked
Gojko Muzikravić	28	Čačak	39	49	Evicted
Elmir Kuduzović	26	Tuzla, Bosnia and Herzegovina	7	42	Evicted
Tanja Obradović	21	Loznica	1	39	Evicted
Miloš "Mišel" Vasiljević	20	Gornji Milanovac	1	35	Evicted
Jelena Žeželj	20	Belgrade	1	35	Evicted
Ranka Radanović	22	Čurug	1	7	Evicted

== Nominations table ==
	Week 1	Week 2	Week 3	Week 4	Week 5	Week 6	Week 6	Week 7	Week 8	Week 9	Week 10	Week 11	Week 12	Week 13	Week 14	Week 15	Nominations received
Aleksandar	Not in House						Exempt	Gojko; Miki	No nominations	Zorica; Suzana	Miki; Stevan	Marina; Miki	Vesko; Suzana	No nominations	Vesko; Suzana	Abandoned after promotional incident out of respect for deceased contestants. (Day 99)	14
Burek	No nominations	Tanja; Suzana	Banned	Tanja; Suzana	Evicted (Day 28)									No nominations	Aleksandar; Nataša	Abandoned after promotional incident out of respect for deceased contestants. (Day 99)	16
Đorđe	Not in House						Exempt	Gojko; Nataša	No nominations	Miki; Nataša	Vesna; Miki	Miki; Vesna	Mirko; Vesna	No nominations	Aleksandar; Vesna	Abandoned after promotional incident out of respect for deceased contestants. (Day 99)	4
Nataša	No nominations	Danilo; Elmir	Banned	Tanja; Mišel	Mišel; Tanja	Slaviša; Tanja	Slaviša; Elmir	Slaviša; Zorica	No nominations	Zorica; Suzana	Suzana; Stevan	Suzana; Aleksandar	Mirko; Suzana	No nominations	Suzana; Burek	Abandoned after promotional incident out of respect for deceased contestants. (Day 99)	17
Suzana	No nominations	Burek; Slaviša	Burek; Nataša	Burek; Mićko	Mićko; Mišel	Slaviša; Marina	Slaviša; Miki	Miki; Gojko	No nominations	Aleksandar; Vesna	Vesna; Aleksandar	Aleksandar; Vesna	Mirko; Aleksandar	No nominations	Vesna; Nataša	Abandoned after promotional incident out of respect for deceased contestants. (Day 99)	20
Vesko	Not in House										Aleksandar; Marina	Aleksandar; Marina	Mirko; Aleksandar	No nominations	Aleksandar; Burek	Abandoned after promotional incident out of respect for deceased contestants. (Day 99)	5
Vesna	Not in House						Exempt	Zorica; Đorđe	No nominations	Zorica; Suzana	Suzana; Marina	Suzana; Marina	Mirko; Suzana	No nominations	Suzana; Đorđe	Abandoned after promotional incident out of respect for deceased contestants. (Day 99)	13
Dijana	No nominations	Danilo; Stevan	Burek; Mišel	Mićko; Mišel	Banned	Tanja; Marina	Slaviša; Elmir	Zorica; Miki	No nominations	Zorica; Đorđe	Vesko; Miki	Miki; Vesna	Mirko; Vesko	No nominations	Evicted (Day 91)		9
Danilo	Not in House	Mišel; Dijana	Evicted (Day 14)											No nominations	Walked (Day 89)		3
Mirko	Not in House											Aleksandar; Nataša	Vesko; Vesna	Evicted (Day 84)			6
Marina	No nominations	Burek; Dijana	Burek; Mićko	Burek; Mićko	Slaviša; Jelena	Slaviša; Mićko	Slaviša; Miki	Slaviša; Gojko	No nominations	Zorica; Miki	Aleksandar; Miki	Miki; Vesna	Evicted (Day 77)				11
Miki	Not in House					Suzana; Elmir	Suzana; Slaviša	Slaviša; Zorica	No nominations	Suzana; Aleksandar	Suzana; Stevan	Marina; Dijana	Walked (Day 75)				19
Stevan	Not in House	Dijana; Burek	Banned	Evicted (Day 21)						Nataša; Miki	Nataša; Miki	Re-evicted (Day 70)					4
Zorica	Not in House						Exempt	Nataša; Vesna	No nominations	Nataša; Vesna	Evicted (Day 63)						10
Slaviša	Not in House	Burek; Mišel	Burek; Mišel	Burek; Mišel	Refused	Tanja; Marina	Suzana; Dijana	Miki; Marina	No nominations	Evicted (Day 56)							18
Mićko	Not in House	Banned	Banned	Banned	Banned	Tanja; Marina	Elmir; Dijana	Gojko; Dijana	Walked (Day 51)								10
Gojko	Not in House						Exempt	Zorica; Đorđe	Evicted (Day 49)								5
Elmir	Not in House	Banned	Banned	Burek; Nataša	Mišel; Nataša	Nataša; Dijana	Miki; Nataša	Evicted (Day 42)									7
Tanja	No nominations	Burek; Nataša	Burek; Nataša	Burek; Mićko	Mišel; Mićko	Slaviša; Nataša	Evicted (Day 39)										9
Mišel	Dijana; Burek; Ranka	Slaviša; Stevan	Slaviša; Stevan	Slaviša; Mićko	Slaviša; Elmir	Evicted (Day 35)											11
Jelena	No nominations	Danilo; Elmir	Banned	Mićko; Tanja	Banned	Evicted (Day 35)											1
Ranka	No nominations	Evicted (Day 7)															1
Notes	^{1}	^{2}	^{3}	^{4}	^{5}	^{6}	None	None	^{7}	None	None	^{8}	^{9}	^{10}	^{11}	Abandoned	
Up for eviction	Burek; Dijana; Ranka	Burek; Danilo; Dijana	Burek; Mišel; Nataša; Stevan	Burek; Mićko	Dijana; Jelena; Mićko; Mišel; Slaviša	Marina; Slaviša; Tanja	Elmir; Miki; Slaviša	Gojko; Zorica	Aleksandar; Miki; Slaviša	Suzana; Zorica	Aleksandar; Miki; Stevan; Suzana	Aleksandar; Marina; Vesna	Mirko; Suzana; Vesko	Aleksandar; Burek; Dijana; Đorđe; Nataša; Suzana; Vesko; Vesna	Aleksandar; Suzana	Abandoned	
Walked	none								Mićko	none		Miki	none	Danilo	none	Abandoned	
Evicted	Ranka; 67.8%	Danilo; 56.8%	Stevan; 61.5%	Burek; 62.3%	Jelena; 35.5%	Tanja; 82.4%	Elmir; 47.7%	Gojko; 61.7%	Slaviša; 47.7%	Zorica; 56.1%	Stevan; 46.8%	Marina; 67.9%	Mirko; 75.0%	Dijana; 34.7%	Abandoned out of respect for deceased contestants.	Abandoned	
Evicted	Ranka; 67.8%	Danilo; 56.8%	Stevan; 61.5%	Burek; 62.3%	Mišel; 24.2%	Tanja; 82.4%	Elmir; 47.7%	Gojko; 61.7%	Slaviša; 47.7%	Zorica; 56.1%	Stevan; 46.8%	Marina; 67.9%	Mirko; 75.0%	Dijana; 34.7%	Abandoned out of respect for deceased contestants.	Abandoned	
Saved	Burek; 21.2% Dijana; 11.0%	Burek; 37.5% Dijana; 5.7%	Burek; 30.5% Mišel; 5.1% Nataša; 2.9%	Mićko; 37.7%	Slaviša; 16.2% Dijana; 14.7% Mićko; 9.4%	Slaviša; 9.2% Marina; 8.4%	Slaviša; 31.7% Miki; 20.6%	Zorica; 38.3%	Miki; 32.7% Aleksandar; 19.6%	Suzana; 43.9%	Aleksandar; 20.2% Miki; 16.5% Suzana; 16.5%	Aleksandar; 19.6% Vesna; 12.5%	Suzana; 17.4% Vesko; 7.6%	Nataša; 33.1% Suzana; 12.3% Burek; 9.2% Aleksandar; 4.7% Đorđe; 2.7% Vesna; 1.9% Vesko; 1.4%	Abandoned out of respect for deceased contestants.	Abandoned	

=== Notes ===
- ^1 Only the Head of Household, Mišel could nominate this week.
- ^2 Elmir was banned from nominating as punishment for talking about politics, Mićko was banned from nominating as punishment for talking about the outside world.
- ^3 Stevan was automatically nominated for threatening Big Brother, Burek was banned for political discussion and provocation, Elmir was banned for throwing fagend to Marina, Jelena and Nataša were banned for public suggestion they would nominate Tanja, Mićko was banned for discussing nominations.
- ^4 Mićko was automatically nominated for violent behavior
- ^5 Dijana and Jelena were automatically nominated for discussing nominations, Slaviša was automatically nominated for refusing to nominate, Mićko was banned for discussing nominations and got a punishment for the whole House - 48 hours without hot water, because of violent behavior. Two Housemates left the House this week
- ^6 Surprising nominations happened on Day 35, Saturday. The 7th Housemate left the House on Day 39, Halloween
- ^7 There were no regular nominations this week. Aleksandar and Miki were automatically nominated for failing to succeed in the weekly assignment. Miki chose Slaviša to be the 3rd nominee. Dijana, Marina, Nataša, Slaviša and Suzana were given the chance to return one of the evicted Housemates back to the House. They chose Stevan.
- ^8 Mirko could not be nominated this week because it was his first week in the House. Miki decided to leave the House on Day 75 after he failed to convince Mirko, his father, to leave the House.
- ^9 Dijana and Đorđe could not be nominated this week because they won immunity in this week's wedding task. Two Housemates returned to the House after 35-min public vote on Day 84.
- ^10 There were no nominations this week and all Housemates were nominated because Danilo refused to leave the confession room. He protested since Big Brother refused to bring him his clothes. Dijana and Đorđe could have won immunity to nominations if they had completed the weekly assignment.
- ^11 The nominations were public, for the first and only time in the season.
