= Miki Đuričić =

Serbian television personality

- Born: Miroslav Đuričić; 13 March 1977 (age 49); Kupinovo, SR Serbia, SFRY
- Occupations: TV personality; farm worker
- Years active: 2006–present
- Television: Veliki Brat; Farma; Parovi; Zadruga
- Children: 2

Miroslav Đuričić (Serbian Cyrillic: Мирослав Ђуричић; born 13 March 1977), better known as Miki, is a Serbian television personality. Born and raised in the village of Kupinovo, he rose to prominence as a contestant on the first season of the reality television series Veliki brat in 2006. Đuričić later won the third celebrity season of the show in 2009.

Additionally, he has also participated on other reality shows like Farma (2013), Parovi (2015-2016) and Zadruga (2018-2022).

== Career in television ==
In September 2006, Đuričić came to public attention by entering the first season of the Serbian spin-off of the Big Brother franchise. He ultimately voluntarily left the show on day 15. After his appearance, Đuričić has acquired substantial fame and a career in show business. In October 2006, he became the first man to be featured on the cover of the Playboy magazine in Serbia. Furthermore, Đuričić served as a presenter of his own call-in show on Radio B92 for seven months, appeared as a guest on the eminent political talk show Utisak nedelje and starred in TV commercials among other ventures. In late October 2007, he returned for the show's second season, but walked once again after his father, Mirko Đuričić, had entered the competition.

On March 9, 2009, Đuričić among fourteen other celebrities became a contestant on Veliki Brat VIP. After close to a month on the show, on April 6, he left the house winning the €50,000 prize.

== Personal life ==
Đuričić was born on 13 March 1977 in the village of Kupinovo, SFR Yugoslavia. He survived clinical death at his birth. Đuričić grew up in an agricultural family.

He attended the secondary technical school "Zmaj" in Zemun, from which he dropped out in the first year.

In June 2019, Đuričić was disqualified from the reality series Zadruga and subsequently received a 30-day detention after physically assaulting two female fellow-contestants, Nadežda Biljić and Suzana Perović. He was later sentenced to a year in house arrest.

In late August 2020, he became a father to a daughter, named Dunja. In August the following year, Đuričić married the mother of his child.

== Filmography ==
Filmography of Miroslav Đuričić
Year	Title	Genre	Role	Notes
2006-2007	Veliki Brat	Television	Himself	Seasons 1 and 2; Walked
2007	Mile protiv tranzicije	Television	Himself	1 episode
2008	Plesom do snova	Television	Himself	Eliminated on the 8th episode
2010	Veliki Brat VIP	Television	Himself	Season 3; Winner
2012	Vir	Film	Himself	Cameo appearance
2013	Farma	Television	Himself	Season 5, Walked
2015	Maldivi	Television	Himself	Season 2, Walked
2015-2016	Parovi	Television	Himself	Season 4, Eliminated
2017-2022	Zadruga	Television	Himself	Season 1, Walked; Seasons 2 and 4, Disqualified; Season 5, 8th place Season 6, Walked

== See also ==
- Miroslav Đuričić at IMDb
