= Big Brother 8 =

Big Brother 8 is the eighth season of various versions of Big Brother and may refer to:

- Gran Hermano Spain (season 8), the 2006 Spanish edition of Big Brother
- Big Brother 8 (UK), the 2007 UK edition of Big Brother
- Big Brother 8 (U.S.), the 2007 U.S. edition of Big Brother
- Big Brother Germany (season 8), the 2008 German edition of Big Brother
- Big Brother Brasil 8, the 2008 Brazilian edition of Big Brother
- Grande Fratello (season 8), the 2008 Italian edition of Big Brother
- Big Brother Australia 2008, the 2008 Australian edition of Big Brother
- Big Brother 2012 (Finland), the 2012 edition of Big Brother in Finland
- Big Brother Africa 8, the 2013 edition of the African version
- Secret Story 8 (France), the 2014 edition of Big Brother in France
- Bigg Boss 8 (disambiguation)
  - Bigg Boss 8, the 2014-2015 Indian version of Big Brother in India in Hindi
  - Bigg Boss Kannada (season 8), eighth season of Big Brother in India in Kannada
  - Bigg Boss (Tamil season 8), eighth season of Big Brother in India in Tamil

== See also ==
- Big Brother (franchise)
- Big Brother (disambiguation)
