= Big Brother Canada season 8 =

Season of television series

Big Brother Canada
- Season 8
- Big Brother Canada 8 title card
- Presented by: Arisa Cox
- No. of days: 25
- No. of houseguests: 16
- Winner: None
- Companion shows: Big Brother Canada: After Dark; Big Brother: After the Eviction
- No. of episodes: 11

Release
- Original network: Global
- Original release: March 4 – April 1, 2020

Additional information
- Filming dates: February 29 – March 24, 2020

Season chronology
- ← Previous; Season 7 Next → Season 9

Big Brother Canada 8 is the eighth season of the Canadian reality television series Big Brother Canada. It is based on the Dutch series of the same name, which gained notoriety in 1999 and 2000. Arisa Cox returned as the host for the series. The season premiered with a two-night premiere on March 4–5, 2020, on Global and was expected to end on May 21 with the live finale. Preceding the two-night premiere, on March 1, there was a one hour long event, titled Big Brother Canada's Supersized Season 8 Preview with ET Canada, which featured interviews with the entire cast, an exclusive tour of the house with Arisa Cox, a retrospective on the past seven seasons, and the official reveal of the season's superhero theme.

The season was planned to run for a total of 83 days. However, on March 24, 2020, Big Brother Canada announced an early end to production on the season due to the COVID-19 pandemic in Canada, with the season finale airing on April 1, 2020. All filming ceased on March 24. The CA$100,000 prize that would have gone to the winner went to a COVID-19 relief charity.

== HouseGuests ==
The cast of the eighth season of Big Brother Canada. From left to right: Chris, Minh-Ly, John Luke, Carol, Jamar, Rianne, Hira, Angie, Micheal, Brooke, Sheldon, Susanne, Kyle, Vanessa, Nico and Madeline

The HouseGuests' images and profiles were released on Wednesday, February 26, 2020.

Name	Age	Occupation	Residence	Result
Angie Tackie	33	Communications officer	Winnipeg, Manitoba	Season discontinued Day 25
Brooke Warnock	26	Social support worker	Calgary, Alberta	Season discontinued Day 25
Carol Rosher	44	Disability caregiver	Nanaimo, British Columbia	Season discontinued Day 25
Chris Wyllie	28	Brain transformation specialist	Markham, Ontario	Season discontinued Day 25
Hira Deol	30	Accountant	Brampton, Ontario	Season discontinued Day 25
John Luke Kieper	22	Journalist	Kamloops, British Columbia	Season discontinued Day 25
Madeline Di Nunzio	30	Substitute teacher	Toronto, Ontario	Season discontinued Day 25
Minh-Ly Nguyen-Cao	28	Flight attendant	Montreal, Quebec	Season discontinued Day 25
Rianne Swanson	29	Operating room nurse	Chetwynd, British Columbia	Season discontinued Day 25
Sheldon Jean	24	Professional wrestler	Ottawa, Ontario	Season discontinued Day 25
Susanne Fuda	24	Corporate recruiter	Vaughan, Ontario	Season discontinued Day 25
Vanessa Clements	26	Lobster fisherman	Mill River, Prince Edward Island	Season discontinued Day 25
Kyle Rozendal	31	Electrician	Okotoks, Alberta	Expelled; Day 19
Jamar Lee	23	Warehouse worker	Ajax, Ontario	Expelled; Day 18
Micheal Stubley	25	Military infantryman	Prince George, British Columbia	Evicted; Day 13
Nico Vera	31	Sales manager	Toronto, Ontario	Walked; Day 5

=== Future appearances ===
Jamar Lee and Minh-Ly Nguyen-Cao appeared on the fifth season of Ex on the Beach. Vanessa Clements competed on the second season of Squid Game: The Challenge.

== Episodes ==
No. overall	No. in season	Title	Day(s)	Original release date	Canada viewers (millions)	Weekly ranking
Week 1
207	1	Episode 1	Day 1	March 4, 2020	1.377	12
The sixteen HouseGuests all entered the BBCAN superhero-themed house. After formal introductions, Arisa Cox appeared on the screen in the living room, informing the HouseGuests that the Canadian public has been voting for their favourite HouseGuests from February 26–29. The four HouseGuests who received the lowest number of votes, Chris, Nico, Minh-Ly, and Susanne, would have to compete in two competitions. The winners of each competition would then be granted safety for the week, leaving only two people on the block by the first eviction night.: Strength Safety Competition ("Zero to Hero"): HouseGuests had to pull on a rope to keep a car from falling off a bridge. Periodically throughout the challenge, the weight of the car would get heavier, proportional to the weight of the HouseGuest. The HouseGuest that kept their car from falling off the bridge earned safety for the week. Chris' car fell first, followed by Nico's car. Thirty-five minutes later, Minh-Ly won the first competition after Susanne's car fell, granting her safety.
208	2	Episode 2	Days 1–6	March 5, 2020	1.129	23
Mental Safety Competition ("Sold Separately"): HouseGuests have to memorize the new line of BBCAN life-sized action figures (portrayed by other HouseGuest). Then, a series of true or false questions were asked, and each question answered correctly earned that HouseGuest a point. The HouseGuest with the most points after five questions wins safety for the week. Chris won with four points, leaving Nico and Susanne nominated for eviction.; On Day 5, Nico goes into the Diary Room and declares that he will self–evict, feeling like he can't earn the votes to stay despite multiple HouseGuests saying they'll vote for him. Executive producer Erin Brock announced the news to the HouseGuests, stating that eviction planned for Day 6 was canceled.: Head of Household Competition ("Basket–wall"): (Note: This Head of Household competition began in episode 2 on Day 6. However, completion was not broadcast on television until episode 3.) One at a time, HouseGuests bounced on a trampoline and shot a basketball into several different hoops with different point values for each. The HouseGuest who scored the highest would become the Head of Household. At the end of the episode, Jamar and Minh-Ly were tied with 24 points each; however, the episode was left on a cliffhanger as not everyone had shot yet.
Week 2
209	3	Episode 3	Days 6–7	March 8, 2020	1.171	20
Head of Household Competition ("Basket–wall"): With a score of 28, Chris won, and became the Head of Household.; Chris and Kyle create a plan to nominate Brooke and Hira to backdoor Micheal. He wants to target Micheal because he is jealous of his relationship with Madeline. They make the plan to tell the alliance of Micheal, Madeline, John Luke, and Rianne, called "The Evictors," that they will backdoor Minh-Ly in order for them to use the Veto if they win. On Day 7, Chris decided to nominate Brooke and Hira for eviction, with Micheal also on the shortlist.
210	4	Episode 4	Days 7–10	March 11, 2020	1.148	24
The Evictors started to become suspicious of Chris’ nominations. On Day 8, it was revealed that the Head of Household would not be able to compete in the Power of Veto Competition until the Final 5 stage. Brooke and Hira, along with Carol, Madeline, and Vanessa competed for the Power of Veto.: Power of Veto Competition ("Sleigh the Veto"): With Susanne hosting, HouseGuests had to crawl across an icy path to retrieve a fish from a cold lake using only their mouths. Once they have retrieved all their fish, they had to uncover a fish puzzle, and solve it using their provided rack. They had to be careful, as they had more fish than needed. The first HouseGuest to correctly solve their puzzle would win the Power of Veto. After being neck and neck the whole competition, Hira edged out Vanessa and won the Power of Veto.; On Day 10, Vanessa won the Skip the Slop vote, cancelling her Have-Not stay short. She was also able to have a meal delivered from Skip The Dishes. During the Power of Veto Ceremony that day, Hira used the Power of Veto on himself, and Chris nominated Micheal as the replacement, leaving Brooke and Micheal as the final nominees.
211	5	Episode 5	Days 10–13	March 12, 2020	1.075	27
Shortly after the Power of Veto Ceremony, Madeline and Micheal talked with Chris in the Head of Household room, confronting him for lying to the Evictors.: Luxury Competition ("Enjoying the Summer") The HouseGuests were tasked to "Enjoy the Summer" in the outdoor Hot-Tub area on a cold raining day. The four HouseGuests to last the longest received a special prize by Summer Fresh. Angie, Hira, John Luke, and Micheal won a special dinner that night.; Minh-Ly talks to Micheal, and says that Kyle was the mastermind in his nomination, and that he should confront him. This causes a huge blowup between the two opposing sides of the house. On Day 13, by a vote of 9–3, Micheal was evicted from the Big Brother Canada house, being the first (and only) player to be evicted in the season.: Head of Household Competition ("Slippery When Wet"): (Note: This Head of Household competition began in episode 5 on Day 13. However, completion was not broadcast on television until episode 6.) HouseGuests must search in a ball pit for special yellow balls. When HouseGuests find a yellow ball, they can place the ball in one of their fellow HouseGuest's tubes. Once a HouseGuest's tube reaches ten balls, they are eliminated from the competition. The last HouseGuest standing will become the next Head of Household. In addition, the first four eliminated HouseGuests would become Have–Nots for the week.
Week 3
212	6	Episode 6	Days 13–14	March 15, 2020	1.333	19
Head of Household Competition ("Slippery When Wet"): After a hard-fought battle, Angie, Kyle, Madeline and Vanessa became Have-Nots, and Sheldon won the competition, making him the new Head of Household.; On Day 14, Sheldon nominated Madeline and Rianne for eviction, with John Luke and Minh-Ly also on the shortlist.
213	7	Episode 7	Days 14–17	March 18, 2020	1.385	13
After the Nomination Ceremony, Sheldon told Vanessa to throw the Veto Competition. However, in order to hide her alliance with him, Vanessa told Minh-Ly she was told by Brooke to throw the competition. Minh-Ly tells Kyle this information, and brings this information to Brooke, which she denies. This leads to a confrontation between Sheldon, Kyle, Brooke, and Vanessa. During the confrontation, Vanessa denies that she told Minh-Ly that information, placing the target on Minh-Ly.: Power of Veto Competition ("Spring Fling"): HouseGuests and their selected pairs had to transfer balls using only their faces. The first team to transfer all of their balls to the other side will win the Power of Veto. The original HouseGuest picked at the Veto Ceremony will win the Power of Veto, while their partner will become immune for the rest of the week. After a three-way tie with Minh-Ly and Vanessa and Rianne and Hira, Madeline and John Luke won, granting Madeline the Power of Veto and John Luke immunity.; On Day 17, Madeline took herself off of the block. Sheldon, as Head of Household, had to choose a replacement nominee. He picked Minh-Ly, making the final nominees Minh-Ly and Rianne.
214	8	Episode 8	Days 16–20	March 19, 2020	1.285	15
On Day 16, HouseGuests were told about the COVID-19 pandemic. They were told that their families were healthy and that there was no reason to worry. Each HouseGuest got a letter from home. On Day 17, Carol made a joke about how the police would come after Jamar in Prince Edward Island, presumably because of his ethnicity. After a talk with Angie and Hira, Jamar went to have a discussion with Carol to enlighten her about her problematic behavior. Carol admitted that it was very insensitive and the two cleared it up. Later that day, Minh-Ly held a house meeting to expose Vanessa's lie about throwing the competition. At that house meeting, Jamar supposedly threatened Kyle and made Vanessa say she was uncomfortable. Jamar was then called to the Diary Room. On Day 19, Kyle was expelled after problematic behavior was brought to light. The week was reset and the eviction was canceled.: Head of Household Competition ("Snooze, You Lose"): (Note: This Head of Household competition began in episode 8 on Day 20. However, completion was not broadcast on television until episode 9.) HouseGuests are stuck in sleeping bags. On go, HouseGuests must hold onto their bar and keep holding on. Once a HouseGuest lets go of their bar and falls, they are eliminated. The HouseGuest to hold on the longest will become the next Head of Household. What the HouseGuests weren't told is that the Head of Household would earn a secret power revealed later in the game.
Week 4
215	9	Episode 9	Days 20–21	March 22, 2020	<1.051	>30
Head of Household Competition ("Snooze, You Lose"): After it came down to Chris, Hira, and Sheldon, Hira dropped. Chris and Sheldon made a deal, solidifying a Final 2 deal. After Chris dropped, Sheldon became the next Head of Household.; After the competition, Carol told Sheldon that she wanted to be nominated and evicted this week, but the group of Sheldon, Brooke, and Chris wanted Minh-Ly to go home. Also that night, the HouseGuests were able to throw a party for Hira's birthday. On Day 21, Carol called a house meeting to inform everyone that she wants to be evicted. That day, Sheldon, as the Head of Household, won the Wendy's Powerup Necklace. He could choose between two powers. He could either "chop" a vote, meaning he could cancel a vote at this week's eviction, or "spice up" the Power of Veto competition, where he could play in the competition. He was given one day to make the decision. At the nomination ceremony on Day 21, Sheldon decided to nominate Carol and Minh-Ly for eviction, with Rianne also on the shortlist.
216	10	Episode 10	Days 21–24	March 25, 2020	1.110	25
The episode opened with a special message from Arisa informing the viewers of production’s shutdown - and that this episode was produced prior to the Shutdown. On Day 22, Chris, Hira, and Vanessa were chosen to compete in the Power of Veto competition along with the nominees. It was also revealed that Sheldon used the "Chop the Vote" power.: Power of Veto Competition ("Cannonball"): Competitors transported one of their cannonballs across a drawbridge to their platform. They'd then have to place it in one of the divots. This process repeated until all of their balls have been transported. If one of their cannonballs touched the ground, they’d have to start over. The first HouseGuest to successfully transfer all their balls and return to the castle would win the Power of Veto. Hira won.; On Day 24, John Luke won the Skip the Slop vote, cancelling his Have-Not stay short. He was also able to have a meal delivered from Skip The Dishes. Hira decided not to use the Power of Veto, leaving Carol and Minh-Ly as the final nominations.
Finale / post-production
217	11	Episode 11	Days 24–25	April 1, 2020	1.195	21
On Day 24, at 4:47 p.m. EDT, the HouseGuests were told that the production of the eighth season of Big Brother Canada would cease on Day 25. The HouseGuests were given the rest of the day and the next day to pack everything up and say their goodbyes to each other. On Day 25, the HouseGuests were shown a montage of the best moments from the past twenty-five days and videos from each of their families. Then, one at a time, the HouseGuests were told to leave the house and head home. The last two HouseGuests, Brooke and Sheldon, exited the house at 7:31 p.m. EDT on Day 25, marking the end to the season. The show closed with the shots of the empty house as the house's lights were all turned off, but in superhero movie fashion, a brief post-credits scene, Big Brother's illuminated eye turned back on - a reminder that Big Brother will always be watching.

== Voting history ==
Color key:

Head of Household
Nominated for eviction
Immune from eviction
Won immunity via competition
Evicted
Expelled by production
Walked

	Week 1	Week 2	Week 3	Week 4
Head of Household	(None)	Chris	Sheldon	Sheldon
Nominations (pre-veto)	(None)	Brooke; Hira	Madeline; Rianne	Carol; Minh-Ly
Veto Winner	(None)	Hira	Madeline	Hira
Nominations (post-veto)	Nico; Susanne	Brooke; Micheal	Minh-Ly; Rianne	Carol; Minh-Ly
Angie	Nominations void (Note: Canada voted to save a HouseGuest. The Top HouseGuests was granted Immunity for the week.)	Micheal	Nominations void	Show discontinued (Day 25)
Brooke	Nominations void	Nominated	Nominations void	Show discontinued (Day 25)
Carol	Nominations void	Micheal	Nominations void	Show discontinued (Day 25)
Chris	Nominations void (Note: This HouseGuest won safety by competition.)	Head of Household	Nominations void	Show discontinued (Day 25)
Hira	Nominations void	Micheal	Nominations void	Show discontinued (Day 25)
John Luke	Nominations void	Brooke	Nominations void (Note: This HouseGuest earned Immunity in the Power of Veto competition.)	Show discontinued (Day 25)
Madeline	Nominations void	Brooke	Nominations void	Show discontinued (Day 25)
Minh-Ly	Nominations void	Micheal	Nominated	Show discontinued (Day 25)
Rianne	Nominations void	Brooke	Nominated	Show discontinued (Day 25)
Sheldon	Nominations void	Micheal	Head of Household	Show discontinued (Day 25)
Susanne	Nominated	Micheal	Nominations void	Show discontinued (Day 25)
Vanessa	Nominations void	Micheal	Nominations void	Show discontinued (Day 25)
Kyle	Nominations void	Micheal	Nominations void	Expelled (Day 19)
Jamar	Nominations void	Micheal	Nominations void	Expelled (Day 18)
Micheal	Nominations void	Nominated	Evicted (Day 13)	
Nico	Nominated	Walked (Day 5)		
Evicted	Eviction cancelled	Micheal; 9 of 12 votes to evict	Eviction cancelled	Show discontinued

== Have-Nots ==
	Week 1	Week 2 (Note: In Week 2, the Canadian public voted on which HouseGuest they wanted to relieve of slop. The HouseGuest that receives the most votes will be able to have a meal. Vanessa won the vote, cancelling her Have-Not status, and receiving a meal from Skip The Dishes.)	Week 3 (Note: In Week 3 on Day 16, the Have-Not phase was suspended for the week after the HouseGuests were told about the COVID-19 pandemic.)	Week 4 (Note: In Week 4, the Canadian public voted on which HouseGuest they wanted to relieve of slop. The HouseGuest that receives the most votes will be able to have a meal. John Luke won the vote, cancelling his Have-Not status, and receiving a meal from Skip The Dishes.)
Have-Nots	none	Kyle, Madeline, Micheal, ~~Vanessa~~	Angie, Kyle, Madeline, Vanessa	Brooke, ~~John Luke~~, Rianne, Susanne

== Nomination shortlist ==
	Week 1	Week 2	Week 3	Week 4
HOH	none	Chris	Sheldon	Sheldon
Shortlist	none	Brooke, Hira, Micheal	Madeline, Rianne, John Luke, Minh-Ly	Carol, Minh-Ly, Rianne

== Production ==
=== Development ===
On May 30, 2019, Big Brother Canada was renewed for an eighth season. Nine months later, on January 20, 2020, Global announced the two-night premiere on March 4–5, 2020. With the premiere date, they announced the "supersized" theme, but nothing about what that entails. Arisa Cox returned as the season's host.

On March 4, or Day 5 inside the house, Nico Vera decided to leave the game. This was the second time HouseGuest quit Big Brother Canada and the first time for non-personal reasons, after Ramsey Aburaneh left on season 4 due to a family emergency.

Then, on March 16, or Day 17 in the house, Jamar Lee was expelled from the house after he broke a house rule by threatening fellow HouseGuest Kyle Rozendal. On March 18, or Day 19, Rozendal was also expelled from the house. These instances were the first and second expulsions in Big Brother Canada history.

==== Impact of the COVID-19 pandemic ====
On March 12, 2020, or Day 13 in the house, Big Brother Canada suspended all live audiences for their shows due to the COVID-19 pandemic. On March 15, or Day 16 inside the house, all of the current HouseGuests were notified of the current events outside of the house, including the pandemic. They were informed that all of their families were healthy. Also that day, production suspended the Have-Not cycle for the week to relieve stress, particularly for the Have-Nots. The HouseGuests were all assessed by a doctor to see if any of them showed signs of the virus; none of them had any symptoms related to the virus. That same day, Global and Insight Productions stated that they plan to continue with the production of the eighth season. On March 22, some of the sixty Big Brother Canada crew members resigned due to concerns about working during the pandemic.

On March 23, 2020 at 4:47 p.m. EDT, in Ontario where the show is filmed, Premier Doug Ford ordered the mandatory 14-day closure of all non-essential workplaces by March 24 at 11:59 p.m. As a result, Global and Insight Productions announced that production for the season had ended on March 24, moving the finale up from May 21 and having it air on April 1, 2020; they had no plans to resume production at a later time. The CA$100,000 prize that would have gone to the winner went to a COVID-19 relief charity.

It became the third season of Big Brother worldwide to ever be discontinued, the other two being the Arab world's Big Brother: The Boss, after the show caused controversy regarding religious issues, and Serbia's second season of Veliki Brat, after three HouseGuests evicted earlier in the season were killed in a car accident. The second season of the Malayalam version of Bigg Boss in India became the fourth season to be discontinued, also due to the pandemic.

=== Casting ===
Kasting Inc. returned to cast the eighth season. On August 15, 2019, casting opened online, with open casting calls beginning on October 12, 2019. Open casting calls were held in Vancouver, Calgary, Halifax, Winnipeg, Moncton, Saskatoon, Victoria, Edmonton, Montreal, St. John's, Kelowna, and Toronto. The ability to apply online closed on November 15, 2019. The HouseGuests were announced on February 26, 2020.

=== Filming ===
Filming started on February 29, 2020, with a live audience for the premiere episode. A live audience was featured during the two-night premiere. However, on March 12 during the fifth episode, Arisa Cox announced that there will no longer be a live audience over concerns of having large gatherings during the COVID-19 pandemic. Filming took place at Studio 550 in Toronto, Ontario.

Filming came to a halt on March 24 after production ended the season due to the pandemic. The finale was scheduled for May 21. Instead, a special farewell special aired on April 1.

==== House design ====
On February 24, 2020, Global released eight images from the house, including the Head of Household room, kitchen, diary room, and backyard. With this drop, the theme for the season was confirmed to be comic books and superheroes. During the Big Brother Canada's Supersized Season 8 Preview with ET Canada special on March 1, Arisa Cox gave the viewers a full house tour. The house features an Expedia departure lounge, a swamp-styled Have-Not room, and a Fortress of Solitude style Head of Household ensuite.

=== Release ===
On January 20, 2020, a press release from Global announced that a never before seen special will air on March 1, 2020, three days before the two-night premiere starting on March 4. Big Brother Canada's Supersized Season 8 Preview with ET Canada will feature interviews with the entire cast, an exclusive tour of the house with Arisa Cox, a retrospective on the past seven seasons, and the official reveal of the season's supersized theme. The free 24/7 live feeds, hosted on Big Brother Canada's website, started on March 5 at 9:00 p.m. EST (6:00 p.m. PST) after the first eviction episode and ended on March 23 abruptly at around 4 p.m. EDT (1:00 p.m. PDT). On March 24, 2020, Global announced that they would be moving the finale broadcast date up from May 21 to April 1 due to the COVID-19 pandemic causing the season to end earlier.

== Reception ==
=== Viewing figures ===
No.	Air date	Timeslot (ET)	Total viewers (AMA in millions)	Rank (week)	Refs
1	Wednesday, March 4, 2020	7:00 p.m.	1.377	12	
2	Thursday, March 5, 2020	8:00 p.m.	1.129	23	
3	Sunday, March 8, 2020	8:00 p.m.	1.171	20	
4	Wednesday, March 11, 2020	7:00 p.m.	1.148	24	
5	Thursday, March 12, 2020	8:00 p.m.	1.075	27	
6	Sunday, March 15, 2020	8:00 p.m.	1.333	19	
7	Wednesday, March 18, 2020	7:00 p.m.	1.385	13	
8	Thursday, March 19, 2020	8:00 p.m.	1.285	15	
9	Sunday, March 22, 2020	8:00 p.m.	<1.051	>30	
10	Wednesday, March 25, 2020	7:00 p.m.	1.110	25	
11	Wednesday, April 1, 2020	7:00 p.m.	1.195	21	
