= Aravind K.P. =

Indian Motocross racer and Bigboss Kannada season 8 runner

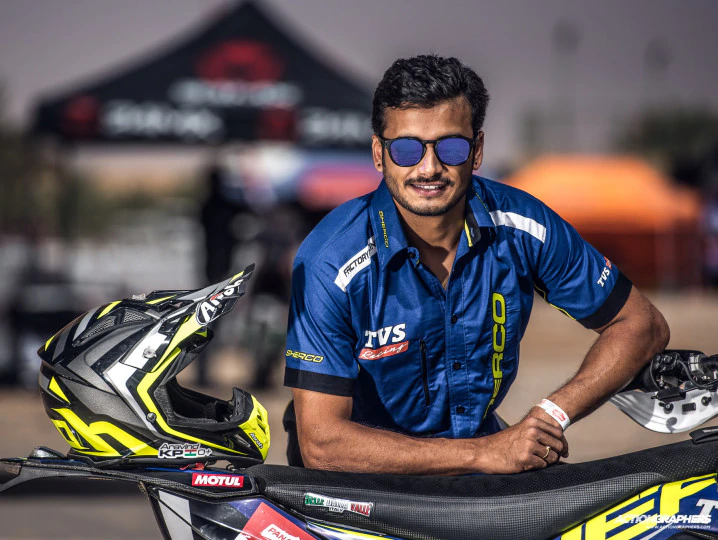
- Born: Aravind Kadiyali Prabhakar; 8 December 1985 (age 40); Udupi, Karnataka, India
- Education: St Aloysius College
- Occupation: Indian motorcycle rider
- Years active: 2006–present

Aravind Kadiyali Prabhakar, also known as Aravind K.P., is an Indian professional motor racer. He is the second Indian to complete Dakar Rally successfully after C.S. Santosh. He is a product of TVS Racing.

== Early life ==
Aravind K. P. grew up in Udupi which is known for its iconic race 'Kambla'. When he was 16, a supercross he watched his first supercross event in Manipal and secretly thought of racing as his career. But he did not have a bike and when approached, his father Prabhakar, put forth a condition stating that he would get a bike only if he scores 80% in his 12th board exams. Aravind scored 84.7% in his exams and got his bike. At the age of 19, he started racing after a local mechanic suggested that he ride on the racetrack. He started as a privateer in local events, many of which he took part without the knowledge of his parents. As a student, he did not have much money to spend on racing and his friends used to support him. One day, his father woke up and saw his photo in the newspaper after he won the 'Raymond's classic' race in Mangalore. Initially his parents did not like him racing but later supported him. Aravind is also a National level swimmer, a state level skater and was also active in track and fields events.

== Motorsports career ==
In 2005, he made his debut in Indian motocross Nationals and within a year, TVS Racing roped him at Gulf Dirt Track National Championship in 2006. Since then, he has won more than 17 events in different motorsports disciplines like Dirt track, two-wheeler rallies and motocross and supercross events, and also had one international trophy. Aravind biggest victory on Indian soil came in 2015 when he tasted victory at the Raid De Himalaya, considered as the toughest terrain at high altitude. He participated in Dakar Rally thrice. In the 2019 Dakar Rally he finished 37th position becoming the only Indian to finish the rally that year and 2nd Indian overall to finish the rally over the years. He received best sportsperson of the year award in the year 2019 by the Federation of Motor Sports Clubs in India (FMSCI), the governing body for motorsports in India and the ASN of FIA and FIM.

== Big Boss and screen life ==
Aravind has appeared in Dulquer Salmaan's Bangalore Days movie. He was Runner-up in Bigg Boss Kannada Season 8 (BBK 8) Television Reality Show. Aravind K. P. recently was a part of a National record: Mahindra XUV700 24 hours endurance challenge.

== Career highlights ==
2005- Made his debut in National motocross

2006- Won a round of the Gulf Dirt Track National Championship held in Mangalore, Karnataka .

2007- Won a round of the Gulf Dirt Track National Championship at Kolhapur, Maharashtra.

2009- MRF Mogrip National Super Cross Championship

2010- Won a round of the Gulf Dirt Track National Championship at Bhopal, Madhya Pradesh.

2010- Finished 2nd at Vijayabahu Motocross held at Sri Lanka.

2011- First place at the Gajaba Super Cross 2011. Aravind K. P. showed his excellent riding skills by winning two races in the motorcycle racing even and won the racing up to 250 (four stroke) motor one and motor two events at Cartlon Super Sports Festival 2011.

2012- Gulf National Championship Super Cross 2012.

2013- National Champion in Group A foreign bike class and Group B Indian expert class, Winner at the Cavalry Super cross 2013 held in Sri Lanka.

2014- Won Gulf Super Cross 2014 at Nasik, National Super Cross Championship, Fox Hill Super Cross, Sigiri Rally Cross, finished 2nd at Vijayabahu Motor cross held at Sri Lanka.

2015- Won 250cc to 500cc Group A, Foreign expert MRF Mogrip National Super Cross Championship for bikes, Fox Hill Super Cross, Champion Rider Maruti Suzuki Raid De Himalaya, Maruti Suzuki Dakshin Dare Champion, National Champion at Indian National Rally Championship, MRF Mogrip National Super Cross Championship, Won at the V12 Super cross, open class Moto 1 and 2.

2016- Participated at the Oilibya Rally, Morocco, North Africa in 2016 and finished at the 26th position overall, MRF Mogrip National Super Cross Championship.

2017- He finished in 12th place in Pan Africa 2017 in Morocco, Aravind K. P. has created history by finishing at top 15 in last round of FIM cross country world rally championship 2017.

2018- Received Autotrack Motorsports Award in 2018.

2019- He aced the World's toughest Dakar rally at 37th position, Sports star Aces Awards Sportsperson of the year(Motorsports).

2021- He took part in the four-wheeler K1000 rally, a round of the Indian National Rally Championship organised by Karnataka Motor Sports Club, his home club.

== Cinema and television ==
Aravind made his debut in the Kannada movie Naanu Mattu Varalakshmi. He made his debut in the Malayalam movie Bangalore Days.

He played the lead role along with his Bigg Boss co-star Divya Uruduga in director Aravind Kaushik's movie Ardhambardha Prema Kathe released in December 2023.

He is the first runner up in the Bigg Boss Kannada (Season 8). Through Bigg Boss he has achieved a huge fanbase in Karnataka and has inspired lakhs of people through his achievements and behaviour. He also performed the stunts on a motorcycle for MS Dhoni as a body-double in an advertisement.

== Awards ==
- Sports Star Aces Special Award - Sportsman Of the Year (Motorsports) - 2019
- Received the NDTV motorsports award for his tremendous achievements
- 1st Runner up of Bigg Boss Kannada (season 8).
- Received Autotrack Motorsports Award in 2011 for winning the Supercross Championship in Sri Lanka.
