= Bigg Boss 7 =

Bigg Boss 7 is the seventh season of various versions of Bigg Boss (an Indian adaptation of the reality game show Big Brother):

- Bigg Boss (Hindi season 7)
- Bigg Boss Kannada (season 7)
- Bigg Boss Malayalam (season 7)
- Bigg Boss (Tamil season 7)
- Bigg Boss (Telugu season 7)

== See also ==
- Big Brother 7 (disambiguation)
- Bigg Boss (disambiguation)
- Bigg Boss 6 (disambiguation)
- Bigg Boss 8 (disambiguation)
- BB7 (disambiguation)
