= Big Brother: The Boss =

- Logo for Big Brother: The Boss
- Presented by: Razan Moughrabi
- No. of days: 11
- No. of housemates: 12
- Winner: No winner
- Participating countries: Bahrain; Egypt; Iraq; Jordan; Kuwait; Lebanon; Oman; Saudi Arabia; Somalia; Syria; Tunisia

Release
- Original network: MBC 1
- Original release: 21 February – 2 March 2004

Big Brother: The Boss (Big Brother: الرئيس) (also known as Big Brother Arabia) was a 2004 Arabic-language reality television series, based on the worldwide hit Big Brother, in which contestants live in a specially built house while competing for prize money. The show was broadcast by MBC but was suspended in less than two weeks due to public outcry and protests.

The show was filmed in the Amwaj Islands in Bahrain. For the first time in the history of the Big Brother franchise, the house where the contestants lived had gender-segregated bedrooms, sitting areas, and prayer rooms. It also had a communal area for both men and women. The winner was set to receive $100,000.

It was hoped that the show would follow the success of such popular programs as Star Academy, and the recent dating show Al Hawa Sawa, but failed to do so, and instead the show gained major controversy in the countries it aired in. Many were offended by the fact that it featured six men and six women living together in one area (Gender segregation and Islam), despite staying in separate parts of the house, with communication allowed only in open areas such as the kitchen and garden.

The show began airing on 21 February and was discontinued 11 days later on 2 March to avoid more controversy in the Arab World, specifically the Arabian Peninsula. During the first (and only) nominations, Asjan, Bashara, Najwa and Shaza were nominated; however, an eviction never took place. The big prize of US$100,000 was not won.

== Housemates ==
=== Abdul ===
Abdul Hakim is a 25-year-old from Saudi Arabia.

=== Abdullah ===
Abdullah Bishara is a 24-year-old from Somalia.

=== Ala'a ===
Ala'a Omar is a 30-year-old from Oman. She is best known for being the only female Housemate to wear the traditional Hijab. She was unpopular with several housemates (namely Abdullah, Amal, Ashghan, Bishara, Faris and Najwa) who labelled her "boring", but, when it came to nominations, only Bishara nominated her.

=== Amal ===
Amal Saleh is a 20-year-old beautician from Egypt.

=== Ashghan ===
Ashghan Hadad is 26 years old and also from Egypt. She was one of the four Housemates up for Eviction in the first round of Nominations. She, along with Najwa, was the most popular housemate in the outside world.

=== Bishara ===
Bishara is a 29-year-old boutique owner from Lebanon. He was also one of the four Housemates Nominated for Eviction.

=== Faris ===
Faris Ashour is a 22-year-old Karate teacher from Kuwait.

=== Kawthar ===
Kawthar Altareeki is 32 years old and from Tunisia. She was the only housemate to receive no nominations during the first and only round of nominations.

=== Mazen ===
Mazen Jasim is a 22-year-old musician from Iraq.

=== Michael ===
Michael Banna is a 26-year-old from Jordan.

=== Najwa ===
Najwa Hamoud is 31 years old and from Syria. She was up for Eviction as well in the only round of Nominations. She was the most popular housemate in the outside world.

=== Shaza ===
Shaza Sabt is a 29-year-old actress from Bahrain. She, along with Asjan, Bashara, and Najwa was Nominated for Eviction in the first round of Nominations. She was the least popular housemate in the outside world and would have been evicted had the program continued.

== Nominations table ==
	Week 1		Nominations Received
Abdul	Shaza, Mazen	Show discontinued (Day 11)	2
Abdullah	Najwa, Asjan	Show discontinued (Day 11)	2
Ala'a	Bashara, Michael	Show discontinued (Day 11)	1
Amal	Shaza, Najwa	Show discontinued (Day 11)	2
Asjan	Amal, Bashara	Show discontinued (Day 11)	3
Bashara	Asjan, Ala'a	Show discontinued (Day 11)	3
Faris	Abdul, Michael	Show discontinued (Day 11)	2
Kauthar	Shaza, Amal	Show discontinued (Day 11)	0
Mazen	Asjan, Bashara	Show discontinued (Day 11)	1
Michael	Najwa, Faris	Show discontinued (Day 11)	2
Najwa	Faris, Abdullah	Show discontinued (Day 11)	3
Shaza	Abdul, Abdullah	Show discontinued (Day 11)	3
Notes	^{[1]}		
Against public vote	Asjan, Bashara, Najwa, Shaza		
Evicted	~~Shaza~~; 65% to evict		

^{1} Due to the cancellation of the program, the eviction was cancelled and all housemates were ejected from the house.

== The House ==
The house was mainly segregated for the male and female housemates. Single-sex bedrooms, bathrooms and prayer rooms were provided and the only parts of the house accessible to both sexes were the kitchen and garden areas. Parts of the house (e.g. the women's bedroom) were monitored by female camera operators only. Five times a day, Big Brother would announce to the housemates the time for prayer.

== Cancellation ==
Producers decided to cancel the show, as there were many complaints from viewers, complaints on Arab radio talk shows, and public protests. The show's producers actually went into the house in person to inform the housemates that it was to be cancelled. Many of the Housemates were devastated at the news that they had to leave. This season was the first series of Big Brother in the world to be cancelled and not have a winner. This would later happen in the second season of Veliki Brat, the Serbian version of Big Brother, where three contestants from that season died in a car accident, the second season of the Malayalam version of Bigg Boss in India, and the eighth season of Big Brother Canada, the latter two of which were cancelled due to the ongoing COVID-19 pandemic in their respective countries.
