= Big Brother 7 =

Big Brother 7 is a seventh season of various versions of Big Brother and may refer to:

- Gran Hermano (Spanish season 7), the 2005-2006 edition of the Spanish version
- Big Brother (British series 7), the 2006 edition of the UK reality television series Big Brother UK
- Big Brother 7 (American season), also known as Big Brother 7: All-Stars, the 2006 All-Stars edition of the U.S. version
- Big Brother (Australian season 7), the 2007 edition of the Australian version
- Big Brother Brasil 7, the 2007 edition of the Brazilian version
- Big Brother (German season 7), the 2007 edition of the German version
- Grande Fratello (season 7), the 2007 edition of the Italian version
- Big Brother (Finnish season 7), the 2011 edition of Big Brother in Finland
- Gran Hermano (Argentinian season 7), the 2011-2012 edition of the Argentinian Argentina
- Big Brother Africa (season 7), the 2012 edition of the African version
- Bigg Boss 7 (disambiguation)
  - Bigg Boss (Hindi season 7), the 2013 Indian version in Hindi
  - Bigg Boss Kannada (season 7), seventh season of Big Brother in India in Kannada
  - Bigg Boss (Tamil season 7), seventh season of Big Brother in India in Tamil
  - Bigg Boss (Telugu season 7), seventh season of Big Brother in India in Telugu
- Secret Story (French season 7), the 2013 edition of Big Brother in France
- Big Brother Canada (season 7), the 2019 edition of Big Brother in Canada

== See also ==
- Big Brother (franchise)
- Big Brother (disambiguation)
