= Big Brother Canada season 7 =

Big Brother Canada
- Season 7
- Big Brother Canada 7 title card
- Presented by: Arisa Cox
- No. of days: 69
- No. of houseguests: 15
- Winner: Dane Rupert
- Runner-up: Anthony Douglas
- Companion shows: Big Brother Canada: After Dark; Big Brother: After the Eviction
- No. of episodes: 29

Release
- Original network: Global
- Original release: March 6 – May 9, 2019

Additional information
- Filming dates: March 2 – May 9, 2019

Season chronology
- ← Previous; Season 6 Next → Season 8

Big Brother Canada 7 is the seventh season of the Canadian reality television series Big Brother Canada. It is based on the Dutch series of the same name, which gained notoriety in 1999 and 2000. The season premiered on March 6, 2019, on Global and ended after 69 days on May 9, 2019, when Dane Rupert was named the winner and Anthony Douglas the runner-up. This was the first time in history that both the winner and runner-up received zero votes to evict in the entire season.

This season revolved around 15 strangers (known as HouseGuests) living in a house together while being constantly filmed and having no communication with the outside world as they competed to be the last HouseGuest remaining. The HouseGuests competed in challenges for power and safety before voting each other out of the house. When only two HouseGuests remained, a jury formed of previously evicted houseguests decided which finalists win the grand prize of $100,000, a $25,000 home furnishing makeover from Leon's, $10,000 worth of groceries courtesy of Summer Fresh, as well as a dream vacation for two anywhere in the world courtesy of Contiki Holidays. The runner-up received a $20,000 cash prize.

== HouseGuests ==
The cast of the seventh season of Big Brother Canada. Top: Kailyn, Laura, Cory, Damien, Kiera, Chelsea, Eddie, Anthony and Mark Bottom: Maki, Estefania, Arisa (host), Dane, Kyra, Samantha and Adam

The fifteen HouseGuests were revealed on February 27, 2019.

Name	Age	Occupation	Residence	Entry	Result
Dane Rupert	27	Civil technician	Kelowna, British Columbia	1	Winner; Day 69
Anthony Douglas	31	Gas inspector	Richmond Hill, Ontario	1	Runner-up; Day 69
Kyra Shenker	25	Bartender	Montreal, Quebec	1	Evicted; Day 69
Adam Pike	27	Oil field worker	Spaniard's Bay, Newfoundland	1	Evicted; Day 64
Mark Drelich	29	Travel guide	Edmonton, Alberta	1	Evicted; Day 62
Damien Ketlo	28	Goalie coach	Nadleh Whut'en, British Columbia	1	Evicted; Day 55
Estefania Hoyos	23	Student	Gatineau, Quebec	1	Evicted; Day 55
Cory Kennedy	29	Middle school teacher	Sussex, New Brunswick	6	Evicted; Day 48
Samantha Picco	30	Beauty salon owner	Conception Bay South, Newfoundland	1	Evicted; Day 41
Kiera Wallace	23	Bartender	Port Moody, British Columbia	1	Evicted; Day 34
Eddie Lin	25	Cryptocurrency developer	Montreal, Quebec	1	Evicted; Day 27
Chelsea Bird	30	Radio host	Edmonton, Alberta	1	Evicted; Day 27
Kailyn Archer	42	Psychic	Grande Prairie, Alberta	1	Evicted; Day 20
Maki Moto	31	Poet & DJ	Toronto, Ontario	1	Evicted; Day 13
Laura Roberts	26	Judicial clerk	Calgary, Alberta	1	Evicted; Day 6

=== Future appearances ===
In 2023, Samantha Picco appeared on the second season of Bachelor in Paradise Canada. Picco later appeared in the ninth season of the American version of Bachelor in Paradise.

In 2024, Anthony Douglas returned to compete as a HouseGuest on Big Brother Canada 12.

== Summary ==
On Day 1, fourteen HouseGuests entered the spy-themed "Big Brother Canada" House. As the first twist of the season, Damien was selected by Canada to enter the House first, by himself. He had the opportunity to locate a secret "Leon's Lounge" and watch the first two groups enter the House before entering with the last group. After everyone settled in, Arisa dropped another bombshell: the Power of Veto competition for the week would be voided, meaning the two nominees would automatically face the first eviction. She also revealed secrets about everyone publicly. All of the HouseGuests were then locked up for the Operation: Escape Head of Household competition. In this competition, HouseGuests were locked in separate chambers. In the first round, HouseGuests must untie themselves from their chair and use the materials inside the chamber to reach a set of keys to unlock their door. The first seven HouseGuests to unlock their door would move on to the second round. Adam, Kiera, Estefania, Kailyn, Anthony, Mark, and Maki advanced to the second round. For the second round, HouseGuests must use a spoon to dig a hole, crawl under the fence, and hit their button. The first HouseGuest to hit their button will be the first Head of Household of the season. Adam was the winner. On Day 2, Adam nominated Damien and Laura for eviction. On Day 6, Laura was evicted by a unanimous 11-0 vote. Immediately after the eviction, Arisa gave another announcement. Canada voted for either Cory or Holly to enter the House as a "secret asset". Cory was chosen to enter the House, but was also given a secret mission from Arisa. She must make three Final Two deals within 24 hours. If she succeeds, she will earn immunity for the week. If she fails, she will be immediately evicted from the House.

Following Laura's eviction and Cory's entrance, the HouseGuests were teed off in the Golf for It Head of Household competition. In this competition, HouseGuests must balance a golf ball on their over-sized club. If they dropped their ball at any time, they were eliminated. However, at random points throughout the competition, the first HouseGuest to hit their button would earn the right to try and hit their ball into the hole for the win. If they missed the shot, they would be eliminated. The last HouseGuest with their ball on their club, or the first HouseGuest to sink their ball into the hole, will be the new Head of Household. Dane was the winner after being the last one standing. As Head of Household, Dane had to select three HouseGuests to become the first Have-Nots of the season. Adam, Mark, and Samantha became Have-Nots for the week. Cory formed Final Two deals with Kailyn, Damien, and Eddie, thus completing her mission and earning safety for the week. Alliances began forming very quickly. Dane, Adam, Anthony, and Mark formed the "Pretty Boys" alliance; Samantha, Chelsea, Estefania, and Kiera joined the "Pretty Boys" to form "The Eight" alliance. On Day 7, Dane nominated Kyra and Maki for eviction, with Kyra as the target. During the player pick for the Veto competition, another twist was revealed. The Head of Household is not eligible to compete for the Power of Veto until only five HouseGuests remain. On Day 8, Kyra and Maki, as well as Adam, Anthony, and Chelsea, splashed in the On a Roll Power of Veto competition. In this competition, HouseGuests must fill their bucket with sap and walk across the river via the spinning logs. If they fall, they must try again. After they reach the other side, they must pour their bucket into their container. The first HouseGuest to fill their container with enough sap to remove their ball will win the Power of Veto. Adam was the winner. On Day 10, Adam decided not to use the Power of Veto. Despite originally being the pawn, Maki became a target after Anthony and Kyra told Adam that Maki was targeting him and after Maki told Dane he would target him. On Day 11, Karen and Kevin from Big Brother Canada 5 surprised the Have-Nots for a task. After watching a video featuring the two, the Have-Nots were asked a series of questions. If they could answer three questions correctly, they would win a "Wendy's" meal for the whole House. They passed their task and earned the meal. On Day 13, after Dane was the tie-breaker, Maki was evicted by a 6-5 vote.

Following Maki's eviction, the HouseGuests were trained in the Truth and Spies Head of Household competition. In this competition, HouseGuests faced off two at a time at the podium. They were asked a question about their training exercises that took place the day before. HouseGuests must determine whether the question is true or a lie. If they answer correctly, they will advance and eliminate their opponent. If they are incorrect, they will be eliminated and their opponent will advance. The HouseGuest who survived the match will then select the next two HouseGuests to face off. The last HouseGuest standing will be the new Head of Household. Chelsea was the winner. On Day 14, the HouseGuests got sloppy in the Slop and Slide Have-Not competition. For this competition, HouseGuests were divided into teams of three. In each of the first two rounds, one player from each team must slide down the slide into the slop and search for discs with a slop-inspired recipe. Once they find one, they must head over to the table and eat that dish. The first team in each round to eat all three dishes will be Haves for the week. The remaining three HouseGuests will be Have-Nots for the week. Anthony, Eddie, and Samantha became Have-Nots for the week. Chelsea aimed to send Kailyn out the door after Kailyn orchestrated a last-minute attempt to save Maki last week. On Day 14, Chelsea nominated Damien and Kiera for eviction, with the plan to backdoor Kailyn. Before the Power of Veto competition, the players spun a wheel with various numbers. The HouseGuest with the highest number will win an advantage in the Power of Veto competition. Samantha earned the advantage. On Day 15, Damien and Kiera, including Kyra, Samantha, and Cory, gamed in the Instant Bingo Power of Veto competition, sponsored by "OLG". In the first round of the competition, HouseGuests must scratch off their bingo card to reveal their numbers. They must then search the balls being blasted to find the corresponding numbers and place them in their card. The first two HouseGuests to black out their card will move on to the final round. Samantha's advantage gave her two spots already filled in. Kiera and Samantha moved on to the final round. In the final round, the two must attempt to solve a crossword relating to "Big Brother". The first HouseGuest to correctly solve the crossword will win the Power of Veto. Samantha was the winner. On Day 17, Samantha took Kiera off the block, and Chelsea named Kailyn as the replacement nominee. On Day 18, Damien received a clue to embark on a secret mission through the House. After following a series of clues, he entered Leon's Lounge for the opportunity to watch classified information on Mark and Samantha. On Day 20, Kailyn was evicted by a 10-0 vote.

Following Kailyn's eviction, the HouseGuests stuck it out in the Buzzkilled 2.0 Head of Household competition. In this competition, HouseGuests must wait for the buzzer to sound. Once it does, they must hit their button. Throughout the competition, Big Brother will make them offers to lure them away from their button, including pizza and Have cards to avoid being Have-Nots. The last HouseGuest to ring in for each round will be eliminated. The last HouseGuest standing will be the new Head of Household. Dane was the winner. Adam, Cory, and Damien became Have-Nots for the week. Distrust between the guys and the girls of "The Eight" caused paranoia within the alliance, and they began to turn on each other. On Day 21, Dane nominated Chelsea and Kyra for eviction. On Day 22, the nominees, joined by Mark, Samantha, and Cory, put it all on the line in the Comp Beast Hall of Fame Power of Veto competition. In this competition, HouseGuests competed head-to-head. In each match, they must put on their medal, crawl under their hurdles, and cross their balance beam. They must then toss five rings onto their pegs in order to complete one lap. The first HouseGuest to complete three laps will win the match and eliminate their opponent. The winner of the final race will win the Power of Veto. Cory was the winner. On Day 24, Cory decided not to use the Power of Veto. On Day 27, Chelsea was evicted by a 9-0 vote. Arisa then informed the HouseGuests of the Double Eviction. Immediately after, the HouseGuests recalled in the Before or After Head of Household competition. In this competition, HouseGuests were read a series of events that have taken place this season. They must determine whether the first event took place before or after the second event. An incorrect answer resulted in elimination. The last HouseGuest standing will be the new Head of Household. Adam was the winner. He immediately nominated Eddie and Kiera for eviction. Eddie and Kiera, accompanied by Anthony, Estefania, and Mark, then got mazed and confused in the Spaced Out Power of Veto competition. In this competition, HouseGuests must stand and lean on their disc in order to maneuver their ball through their maze. The first HouseGuest to move their ball through the maze to hit their button will win the Power of Veto. Kiera was the winner. At the Veto Meeting, Kiera took herself off the block, and Adam named Kyra as the replacement nominee. On Day 27, Eddie was evicted by an 8-0 vote.

Following Chelsea and Eddie's evictions, the HouseGuests surveyed the scene in the Eye Spy Head of Household competition. In this competition, HouseGuests had two minutes to run throughout the House to study a series of installations. After the two minutes, the HouseGuests were asked a series of questions about what they saw. Each correct answer earned them one point. The HouseGuest with the most points will be the new Head of Household. Samantha was the winner. As a reward for winning Head of Household, Samantha earned the opportunity to warch an exclusive episode from "Adult Swim" with a HouseGuest of her choice. She chose Adam to join her. She was also responsible for choosing the three Have-Nots for the week and chose Dane, Estefania, and Kiera. Arisa surprised the HouseGuests by revealing the existence of a secret room. After finding the secret room, the HouseGuests discovered the Blood Veto. The next morning, the HouseGuests found the Blood Veto missing. After Samantha was sequestered in the Head of Household room, everyone else was presented with a dilemma. They must decide unanimously who should receive the Blood Veto, despite not knowing how it works. This person will be safe for the week and is ineligible to play in the Power of Veto competition. Kyra received the Blood Veto. On Day 28, Samantha nominated Kiera and Mark for eviction. On Day 29, Kiera, Mark, Damien, Estefania, and Adam balanced in the Balance of Power Power of Veto competition. In this competition, HouseGuests will place one ball on their pole and complete one lap on the beam. Each lap, they will add another ball to their pole, making it more difficult to balance. If a ball drops, they may continue, but may only add one ball per trip. If they fall off their beam, they must completely start over. The first HouseGuest to return to the platform with 25 balls will win the Power of Veto. Adam was the winner. On Day 30, Canada voted for Kiera to receive a one night's sleep on a real bed in the Have-Not room. On Day 31, Adam decided not to use the Power of Veto. Immediately after the Veto Meeting, Kyra learned the power of the Blood Veto. After the live eviction vote, Kyra has the power to veto the House's decision and automatically evict the other nominee if they decide to do so. They may only use the Blood Veto at the upcoming eviction, and must keep the power a secret from the others. On Day 34, Kiera was evicted by a 5-1 vote, with Estefania voting to evict Mark. Arisa revealed the power of the Blood Veto to the House, but Kyra decided not to use the Blood Veto and cemented Kiera's eviction.

Following Kiera's eviction, the HouseGuests were gutted in the Pipe Dream Head of Household competition. In this competition, HouseGuests must hang onto their pipe for as long as they can. If they fall off their pipe, they will be eliminated. The last HouseGuest standing will be the new Head of Household. Cory was the winner. For being the first three HouseGuests to fall in the Head of Household competition, Anthony, Kyra, and Mark became Have-Nots for the week. Definite cracks formed within the "Pretty Boys" alliance after Adam got fed up with the others wanting to target Samantha. On Day 35, Cory nominated Dane and Estefania for eviction. On Day 36, Dane and Estefania, plus Kyra, Samantha, and Mark, rolled in the Breaking Records Power of Veto competition. In this competition, HouseGuests must roll their ball along the record and catch it on the other side. Each time they roll and catch their ball, they will earn one point. However, if they drop their ball, their counter will drop to zero. The first HouseGuest to reach 300 points will win the Power of Veto. Dane was the winner. On Day 38, Dane took himself off the block, and Cory named Samantha as the replacement nominee. On Day 41, Samantha was evicted by a 5-1 vote, with Adam voting to evict Estefania. She became the first member of the jury.

Following Samantha's eviction, the HouseGuests sobered up for the Drunk Speeches Head of Household competition. In this competition, HouseGuests must listen to a series of speeches given by HouseGuests this season. However, the speeches are morphed to sound as if they were spoken while drunk. They must identify what day the speech took place. A correct answer earned each HouseGuest one point. The HouseGuest with the most points will be the new Head of Household. Mark was the winner. As Head of Household, Mark was required to name three Have-Nots for the week. Damien, Dane, and Estefania became Have-Nots for the week. In order to hide his alliance, Mark wanted to use one of the "Pretty Boys" as a pawn. On Day 42, Mark nominated Adam and Damien for eviction. On Day 43, Adam, Damien, Kyra, Estefania, and Cory were grilled in the Bring the Spice Power of Veto competition. sponsored by "Wendy's". In this competition, each HouseGuest will have a spice timer that will begin to drain. They must slide down their pole and begin transferring puzzle pieces, two at a time, to their board. If their timer starts to run out, HouseGuests must climb up their ladder and refill it. If their timer completely empties, they will be eliminated. In addition, at one point in the competition, their "craving" phone will ring. The first HouseGuest to answer the phone will receive a larger bucket to help fill their timer. After completing their puzzle, HouseGuests must land six balls into their holes. The first HouseGuest to land six balls into their holes will win the Power of Veto, as well as $5000 from "Wendy's". Adam was the winner. On Day 45, Adam took himself off the block, and Mark named Estefania as the replacement nominee. On Day 46, Adam discovered a black light in the Archive Room, and he found a secret mission to search the room for clues to a "game-changing opportunity". After following the clues, Adam earned the power of the "Secret Assassin". He earned the opportunity to secretly name a third nominee to face this week's eviction. He secretly nominated Cory for eviction. On Day 48, Cory was evicted by a 3-1-0 vote, with Anthony voting to evict Estefania. She became the second member of the jury.

Following Cory's eviction, the HouseGuests delivered in the Ship 'til You Drop Head of Household competition. In this competition, HouseGuests must collect the boxes rolling down the conveyor belt and use their body to press them against the wall. As the competition continues, their stack will get longer and more difficult to hold. In addition, temptation boxes containing prizes, such as letters from home and the right to be a Have, will come down the belt. HouseGuests can choose to accept the temptation by adding it to their stack. If a HouseGuest drops a box, they will be eliminated. The last HouseGuest standing will be the new Head of Household. Adam was the winner. For not accepting the Have boxes, Anthony, Damien, Dane, and Kyra became Have-Nots for the week. Dane discovered "Marsha the Moose" came to life in Leon's Lounge. He was given a secret mission by Marsha to complete a series of tasks with his teeth. He must drop his teeth in someone's drink, get someone to put his teeth in his mouth, and pretend to drop his teeth in a batch of cookies for the HouseGuests. If he succeeds, he will win food for the whole House. He passed his mission and earned the food. To keep up the fake rivalry from last week, Adam lied to Damien and Estefania about wanting to backdoor Mark. On Day 49, Adam nominated Damien and Estefania for eviction. On Day 50, Damien and Estefania, combined with Dane, Kyra, and Mark, mined in the A Miner Delay Power of Veto competition. In this competition, HouseGuests must use their puzzle pieces to fix their broken track. After completing their track, they will hop in their cart and ride to their mine. They must grab a gold nugget and place it on the scale, stacking them as they go. If the nugget does not fit, they must return it to the mine and try again. The first HouseGuest to stack all of their nuggets in the bank will win the Power of Veto. Damien was the winner. On Day 52, Damien took himself off the block, and Adam named Mark as the replacement nominee. On Day 55, Estefania was evicted by a 3-1 vote, with Dane voting to evict Mark. She became the third member of the jury. Arisa then informed the HouseGuests of the Double Eviction. Immediately after, the HouseGuests took their shot in the Right on Cue Head of Household competition. In this competition, each HouseGuest will shoot their ball with the giant pool cue towards the numbered slots at the end of the table. The HouseGuest with the highest score will be the new Head of Household. Dane was the winner. He immediately nominated Damien and Kyra for eviction. Everyone except Dane then chewed each other out in the Balls Out Power of Veto competition. In this competition, HouseGuests will race to remove all of the gum balls from their machine. When empty, they must exit their machine and hit their buzzer. The first HouseGuest to hit their buzzer will win the Power of Veto. Anthony was the winner. At the Veto Meeting, Anthony decided not to use the Power of Veto. On Day 55, Damien was evicted by a 3-0 vote. He became the fourth member of the jury.

Following Estefania and Damien's evictions, the HouseGuests sought a spot in the final four in the We Need An Answer Head of Household competition. In this competition, HouseGuests will be asked a series of trivia questions about the season. HouseGuests must race to find the answer on the wall behind them and buzz in. However, they must move quickly, as only the first three HouseGuests to buzz in will be eligible to receive a point. Each correct answer earned them one point. The HouseGuest with the most points will be the new Head of Household. Kyra was the winner. On Day 56, Big Brother gave the HouseGuests a special task. They were given thirty minutes to study the Archive Room. They would then be given a quiz about items in the room. If they fail the quiz, the whole House will be Have-Nots for the rest of the season. The HouseGuests failed the quiz, but Big Brother revealed it was all a prank, and the Have-Not Room was closed for the season. On Day 56, Kyra nominated Adam and Dane for eviction. On Day 57, the HouseGuests were pinned in the Jewel Heist Power of Veto competition. In this competition, HouseGuests will each stand on a wall with jewel pegs. They must attempt to remove as many pegs as possible in order to earn points. Each green jewel is worth one point, each blue jewel is worth two points, and each red jewel is worth three points. However, as they claim more jewels, they will have less pegs to support themselves on the wall. In addition, they may only steal jewels when the lasers are off. If they fall off the wall, their score will be locked in. The HouseGuest who steals the highest total value in jewels will win the Power of Veto. Adam was the winner. On Day 58, the HouseGuests were locked in "Leon's Lounge", and were surprised to see their loved ones enter the House. The loved ones were given the task to select one of their own to see their HouseGuest. The loved ones selected Kyra, but "Big Brother" let everyone see their loved ones. On Day 59, Adam took himself off the block, and Kyra named Mark as the replacement nominee. Despite originally being the target, Dane's campaigning began to flip Anthony and Kyra's minds in wanting to keep Dane, in hopes of using him to get rid of Adam next week. On Day 62, Mark was evicted by a 2-0 vote. He became the fifth member of the jury.

Following Mark's eviction, the HouseGuests headed to the Mainframe for the Name That Mission Head of Household competition. In this competition, the monitor would begin to reveal five HouseGuests who played in a Power of Veto competition this season. HouseGuests must identify which Power of Veto competition they all competed in. The first HouseGuest to buzz in with the correct answer will earn one point. The HouseGuest with the most points will be the new Head of Household. Dane was the winner. On Day 63, Big Brother Canada 3 winner Sarah Hanlon surprised the HouseGuests for the "Big Brother Canada Awards". The HouseGuests got a Shagadelic makeover and watched memorable moments from the season. On Day 63, Dane nominated Adam and Kyra for eviction. On Day 64, the HouseGuests hunted in the Veto Hunter final Power of Veto competition. In this competition, HouseGuests competed individually. HouseGuests must work their way through the video game to find a series of question boxes. Each box will present them with a different question. The must search their game for the HouseGuests that apply to each question, return them to the box, and buzz in. If they are correct, the box will release a Veto. In addition, hidden throughout the game are gold coins. If a HouseGuest decides to return five coins to the coin box, one minute will be deducted from their final time. The HouseGuest who unlocks all five Vetoes the fastest will win the final Power of Veto of the season. Dane was the winner. At the Veto Meeting, Dane decided not to use the Power of Veto. On Day 64, Anthony cast the sole vote to evict Adam. He became the sixth member of the jury.

Following Adam's eviction, the HouseGuests engaged in their final battle in the Crystal Waters Part 1 of the Final Head of Household competition. In this competition, HouseGuests must carry one crystal at a time down their lane through the water, under the bamboo cage, and onto the floating platform. They will then go back down their lane, retrieve another one, and begin again. However, if they move too quickly, the waves will rock their stack and make it fall over. The first HouseGuest to stack 25 crystals on their platform will win Part 1 of the Final Head of Household competition and automatically advance to Part 3. Dane was the winner. Anthony and Kyra then faced off in the Security Breach Part 2 of the Final Head of Household competition. In this competition, HouseGuests must answer a series of questions to crack the House's security system. They must first find the four answers that apply to the question that appears on the door and hit their buzzer. If correct, they will receive a new question. If incorrect, they must try again. The HouseGuest who completes all of the questions faster will win Part 2 of the Final Head of Household competition and face Dane in Part 3. Kyra was the winner. Dane and Kyra had the final showdown in the Jury Questions Part 3 of the Final Head of Household competition. In this competition, HouseGuests were asked questions based on the members of the jury. A correct answer earned one point. The HouseGuest with more points after seven questions will become the final Head of Household of the season. Dane was the winner. On Day 69, Dane cast the sole vote to evict Kyra. They became the seventh and final member of the jury. On Day 69, after receiving all of the jury's votes, Anthony was deemed the runner-up and walked away with $20,000, and Dane left the House with $100,000, $10,000 worth of groceries from "Summer Fresh", a dream vacation for two courtesy of "Contiki Holidays", a $25,000 home furnishing makeover from "Leon's", and was deemed the winner of Big Brother Canada 7.

== Voting history ==
Color key:

Winner
Runner-up
Head of Household
Nominated for eviction
Immune from eviction
Evicted
Entered the game

	Week 1	Week 2	Week 3	Week 4		Week 5	Week 6	Week 7	Week 8		Week 9	Week 10		
	Week 1	Week 2	Week 3	Day 21	Day 27 (Note: This week was a double eviction week. Following the first eviction, the remaining HouseGuests played a week's worth of games, including Head of Household and veto competitions, and nomination, veto and eviction ceremonies, during the live show, culminating in a second eviction for the week.)	Week 5	Week 6	Week 7	Day 49	Day 55	Week 9	Day 63	Day 69	Finale
Head of Household	Adam	Dane	Chelsea	Dane	Adam	Samantha	Cory	Mark	Adam	Dane	Kyra	Dane	Dane	(None)
Nominations (pre-veto)	Damien; Laura	Kyra; Maki	Damien; Kiera	Chelsea; Kyra	Eddie; Kiera	Kiera; Mark	Dane; Estefania	Adam; Damien	Damien; Estefania	Damien; Kyra	Adam; Dane	Adam; Kyra	Anthony; Kyra	(None)
Veto Winner	(None)	Adam	Samantha	Cory	Kiera	Adam	Dane	Adam	Damien	Anthony	Adam	Dane	(None)	(None)
Nominations (post-veto)	(None)	Kyra; Maki	Damien; Kailyn	Chelsea; Kyra	Eddie; Kyra	Kiera; Mark	Estefania; Samantha	Cory (Note: Adam found the Secret Assassin power - which allowed him to secretly nominate a third HouseGuest.); Damien; Estefania	Estefania; Mark	Damien; Kyra	Dane; Mark	Adam; Kyra	(None)	(None)
Dane	Laura	Maki (Note: As the vote was tied, the Head of Household cast the tie-breaker vote.)	Kailyn	Head of Household	Eddie	Kiera	Samantha	Cory	Mark	Head of Household	Nominated	Head of Household	Kyra (Note: As Head of Household, Dane chose to evict Kyra.)	Winner (Day 69)
Anthony	Laura	Maki	Kailyn	Chelsea	Eddie	Kiera	Samantha	Estefania	Estefania	Damien	Mark	Adam	Nominated	Runner-up (Day 69)
Kyra	Laura	Nominated	Kailyn	Nominated	Nominated	Blood Veto (Note: Kyra was awarded the Blood Veto. Kyra would not vote at the eviction. However, they could overrule the House's Vote to evict the other nominee. Kyra chose not to use the Blood Veto.)	Samantha	Cory	Estefania	Nominated	Head of Household	Nominated	Evicted (Day 69)	Dane
Adam	Head of Household	Maki	Kailyn	Chelsea	Head of Household	Kiera	Estefania	Cory	Head of Household	Damien	Mark	Nominated	Evicted (Day 64)	Dane
Mark	Laura	Maki	Kailyn	Chelsea	Eddie	Nominated	Samantha	Head of Household	Nominated	Damien	Nominated	Evicted (Day 62)		Dane
Damien	Nominated	Kyra	Nominated	Chelsea	Eddie	Kiera	Samantha	Nominated	Estefania	Nominated	Evicted (Day 55)			Dane
Estefania	Laura	Kyra	Kailyn	Chelsea	Eddie	Mark	Nominated	Nominated	Nominated	Evicted (Day 55)				Dane
Cory	Not in House	Exempt (Note: As a new HouseGuest, Cory was immune for the week. She could not compete in the Head of Household or Power of Veto competitions and could not vote in the eviction.)	Kailyn	Chelsea	Eddie	Kiera	Head of Household	Nominated	Evicted (Day 48)					Dane
Samantha	Laura	Maki	Kailyn	Chelsea	Eddie	Head of Household	Nominated	Evicted (Day 41)						Dane
Kiera	Laura	Kyra	Kailyn	Chelsea	Eddie	Nominated	Evicted (Day 34)							
Eddie	Laura	Kyra	Kailyn	Chelsea	Nominated	Evicted (Day 27)								
Chelsea	Laura	Maki	Head of Household	Nominated	Evicted (Day 27)									
Kailyn	Laura	Kyra	Nominated	Evicted (Day 20)										
Maki	Laura	Nominated	Evicted (Day 13)											
Laura	Nominated	Evicted (Day 6)												
Evicted	Laura; 11 of 11 votes to evict	Cory; Canada's choice to enter	Kailyn; 10 of 10 votes to evict	Chelsea; 9 of 9 votes to evict	Eddie; 8 of 8 votes to evict	Kiera; 5 of 6 votes to evict	Samantha; 5 of 6 votes to evict	Cory; 3 of 4 votes to evict	Estefania; 3 of 4 votes to evict	Damien; 3 of 3 votes to evict	Mark; 2 of 2 votes to evict	Adam; Anthony's choice to evict	Kyra; Dane's choice to evict	Dane; 7 votes to win
Evicted	Laura; 11 of 11 votes to evict	Maki; 6 of 11 votes to evict	Kailyn; 10 of 10 votes to evict	Chelsea; 9 of 9 votes to evict	Eddie; 8 of 8 votes to evict	Kiera; 5 of 6 votes to evict	Samantha; 5 of 6 votes to evict	Cory; 3 of 4 votes to evict	Estefania; 3 of 4 votes to evict	Damien; 3 of 3 votes to evict	Mark; 2 of 2 votes to evict	Adam; Anthony's choice to evict	Kyra; Dane's choice to evict	Anthony; 0 votes to win

== Have-Nots ==
	Week 1	Week 2	Week 3	Week 4	Week 5 (Note: During Week 5, Canada voted for Kiera to sleep on a bed with a Tempur-Pedic mattress for one night.)	Week 6	Week 7	Week 8	Week 9	Week 10
Have-Nots	none	Adam, Mark, Samantha	Anthony, Eddie, Samantha	Adam, Cory, Damien	Dane, Estefania, Kiera	Anthony, Kyra, Mark	Damien, Dane, Estefania	Anthony, Damien, Dane, Kyra	none	

== Nomination shortlist ==
	Week 1	Week 2	Week 3 (Note: The shortlist was not revealed to the viewers.)	Week 4 (Note: Due to a double eviction, the second round of week 4 had no shortlist.)		Week 5	Week 6	Week 7	Week 8 (Note: Due to a double eviction, the second round of week 8 had no shortlist.)		Week 9 (Note: From week 9 onward, the shortlist consisted of everyone left in the game, except for the HoH, due to the fact that there was no one else to be considered for nomination.)	Week 10	
HOH	Adam	Dane	Chelsea	Dane	Adam	Samantha	Cory	Mark	Adam	Dane	Kyra	Dane	Dane
Shortlist	Damien, Eddie, Kiera, Laura	Chelsea, Kyra, Maki, Samantha	none	Chelsea, Eddie, Kyra, Samantha	none	Anthony, Dane, Kiera, Mark	Dane, Estefania, Kyra, Samantha	none	none	none	Adam, Anthony, Dane, Mark	Adam, Anthony, Kyra	none

== Production ==
=== Twists ===
==== Power of Veto Competition ====
In a format twist beginning with this season and continued in future seasons, only 5 HouseGuests would compete for the Power of Veto - the two nominees were guaranteed to play along with three HouseGuests chosen by random draw. The Head of Household - who in previous seasons, was guaranteed to play - would not be eligible to compete in the Power of Veto Competition until the Final 5 round.

==== Leon's Secret Lounge ====
A secret room was hidden in a new area of the house - periodically, Canada will get the opportunity to vote to send someone into the room for various reasons until Day 28 when it was revealed to all the HouseGuests. After Day 28, several twists involving more than one HouseGuest or the entire house revolved around the Lounge.

==== Top Level Clearance ====
When the cast was revealed, voting had opened to the public to decide which one HouseGuest would secretly be the first to enter the house. Once in the secret lounge, they could spy on the first two moving-in groups. Damien eventually ended up getting the most votes. Immediately after entering the house, he had to look for a secret room where he could stay and watch the first two groups of HouseGuests move in. After they moved in, he exited the room and joined the third and final move-in group to officially enter the house.

==== Video Intel ====
During Week 3's Nominations Episode, voting opened for Canada to send another HouseGuest into Leon's Lounge. There, this HouseGuest would receive an "unprecedented video leak" and video intel on other HouseGuests. Damien again won the public vote and, after being led through a series of clues, entered Leon's Secret Lounge and selected video intel on Mark and Samantha.

==== Blood Veto ====
The Blood Veto was hidden in the Lounge since Day 1, and both times Damien entered the Lounge, he tried to grab it but an alarm would go off, signaling that it was off limits. On Day 28, the HouseGuests were all told about Leon's Secret Lounge and, consequently, the Blood Veto. Big Brother then told the HouseGuests that they would have to unanimously decide who they thought should receive the Blood Veto despite not knowing how it worked. Kyra won the Blood Veto; however, they then became ineligible to compete in the next Power of Veto competition. They also became immune for the week.

During Week 5's Veto Ceremony, Kyra was sent to the Diary Room to secretly be told about the Blood Veto's power - that while the Blood Veto holder wouldn't vote at the eviction, the Blood Veto holder could overrule the house's eviction vote and choose to evict the other nominee. The Blood Veto was only in play for Week 5's eviction. Kyra decided not to use it, leaving Kiera's Eviction in place.

=== Secret Asset ===
On the night of the premiere, it was revealed that Canada would vote between two “Secret Assets" to enter the house and become the fifteenth and final HouseGuest. Canadians had only twenty-four hours to vote for one of the two assets to enter the house. During the first live eviction episode, it was revealed that Cory was voted in by the Canadian public, but she had to complete a secret mission before officially becoming a permanent houseguest. Her secret mission was to form three separate “Final Two” deals in her first twenty-four hours in the house. If she failed to complete the mission, she would be evicted immediately. She successfully completed her mission by securing three "Final Two" deals in the first twenty-four hours with Eddie, Kailyn, and Damien, making her a permanent HouseGuest. She was also given immunity for the rest of the week. Cory ultimately placed eighth in the season.

Name	Age on entry	Occupation	Residence	Result
Cory Kennedy	29	Middle school teacher	Sussex, New Brunswick	Granted Entry
Holly Noseworthy	33	Armoured guard	Conception Bay South, Newfoundland	Denied Entry

=== Secret Assassin ===
Throughout the season, Big Brother has been placing boxes of paperwork in the archive room. Among the boxes hid the "Secret Assassin" power which let one person anonymously nominate a third nominee for that week's eviction. On Day 44, Adam found a blacklight and a clue which told him to search boxes with the blacklight for a secret power. After much hunting, he found a keypad, and after he entered the numbers on the box into the keypad, he unlocked the power. On Day 45, he used it to nominate Cory.

== Reception ==
Compared to the previous seasons, Big Brother Canada 7 received mixed to negative reviews from both fans and critics of the show, with most labelling it as the worst season in the show's history. The main criticism includes the lack of strategy, gameplay, and entertainment with only one alliance dominating the season. However, the gameplay of Dane Rupert, Anthony Douglas and Adam Pike were praised, with some considered them as three of the ten best players in Big Brother Canada history, with Rupert being called as the greatest in the show's history by some and called as one of the greatest winners in BBCan's history.

Justin Carriero of The Young Folks called Big Brother Canada 7 the most lackluster season of Big Brother Canada. Carriero noted that the season had a great setup to be an amazing season; however the Pretty Boys alliance, made up of Adam Pike, Anthony Douglas, Dane Rupert, and Mark Drelich, which ran the entire season and controlled every eviction vote, made the season repetitive and boring. He also added that many of the other HouseGuests were not strategic and had a lack of gameplay. In his conclusion, he stated, "Big Brother Canada 7 started with fire before flickering out into smoke by the season's end."

=== Canada ratings ===
#	Air Date	Timeslot (ET)	Canada		Source
#	Air Date	Timeslot (ET)	Viewers (AMA (Note: Average minute audience (AMA) is the average number of individuals or (homes or target group) viewing a TV channel, which is calculated per minute during a specified period of time over the program duration.) in millions)	Rank (week)	Source
1	Wednesday, March 6, 2019	7:00 p.m.	1.213	18	
2	Thursday, March 7, 2019	8:00 p.m.	1.232	17	
3	Sunday, March 10, 2019	8:00 p.m.	1.075	22	
4	Wednesday, March 13, 2019	7:00 p.m.	1.191	18	
5	Thursday, March 14, 2019	8:00 p.m.	1.118	21	
6	Sunday, March 17, 2019	8:00 p.m.	1.018	23	
7	Wednesday, March 20, 2019	7:00 p.m.	1.083	18	
8	Thursday, March 21, 2019	8:00 p.m.	1.133	15	
9	Sunday, March 24, 2019	8:00 p.m.	1.163	14	
10	Wednesday, March 27, 2019	7:00 p.m.	1.210	17	
11 (Note: This episode was a special double eviction episode.)	Thursday, March 28, 2019	8:00 p.m.	1.246	16	
12	Sunday, March 31, 2019	8:00 p.m.	1.288	14	
13	Wednesday, April 3, 2019	7:00 p.m.	1.238	22	
14	Thursday, April 4, 2019	8:00 p.m.	1.216	24	
15	Sunday, April 7, 2019	8:00 p.m.	1.120	25	
16	Wednesday, April 10, 2019	7:00 p.m.	1.062	21	
17	Thursday, April 11, 2019	8:00 p.m.	1.124	17	
18	Sunday, April 14, 2019	8:00 p.m.	1.215	12	
19	Wednesday, April 17, 2019	7:00 p.m.	1.134	18	
20	Thursday, April 18, 2019	8:00 p.m.	1.313	14	
21	Sunday, April 21, 2019	8:00 p.m.	1.124	19	
22	Wednesday, April 24, 2019	7:00 p.m.	1.183	17	
23	Thursday, April 25, 2019	8:00 p.m.	1.339	14	
24	Sunday, April 28, 2019	8:00 p.m.	1.164	19	
25	Wednesday, May 1, 2019	7:00 p.m.	1.323	16	
26	Thursday, May 2, 2019	8:00 p.m.	1.196	21	
27	Sunday, May 5, 2019	8:00 p.m.	1.242	18	
28 (Note: This episode was a special eviction episode.)	Wednesday, May 8, 2019	7:00 p.m.	1.183	20	
29 (Note: This episode was a special two-hour episode.)	Thursday, May 9, 2019	8:00 p.m.	1.290	22	
