= Kupinovo =

Kupinovo Купиново (Serbian)
- Village (Selo)
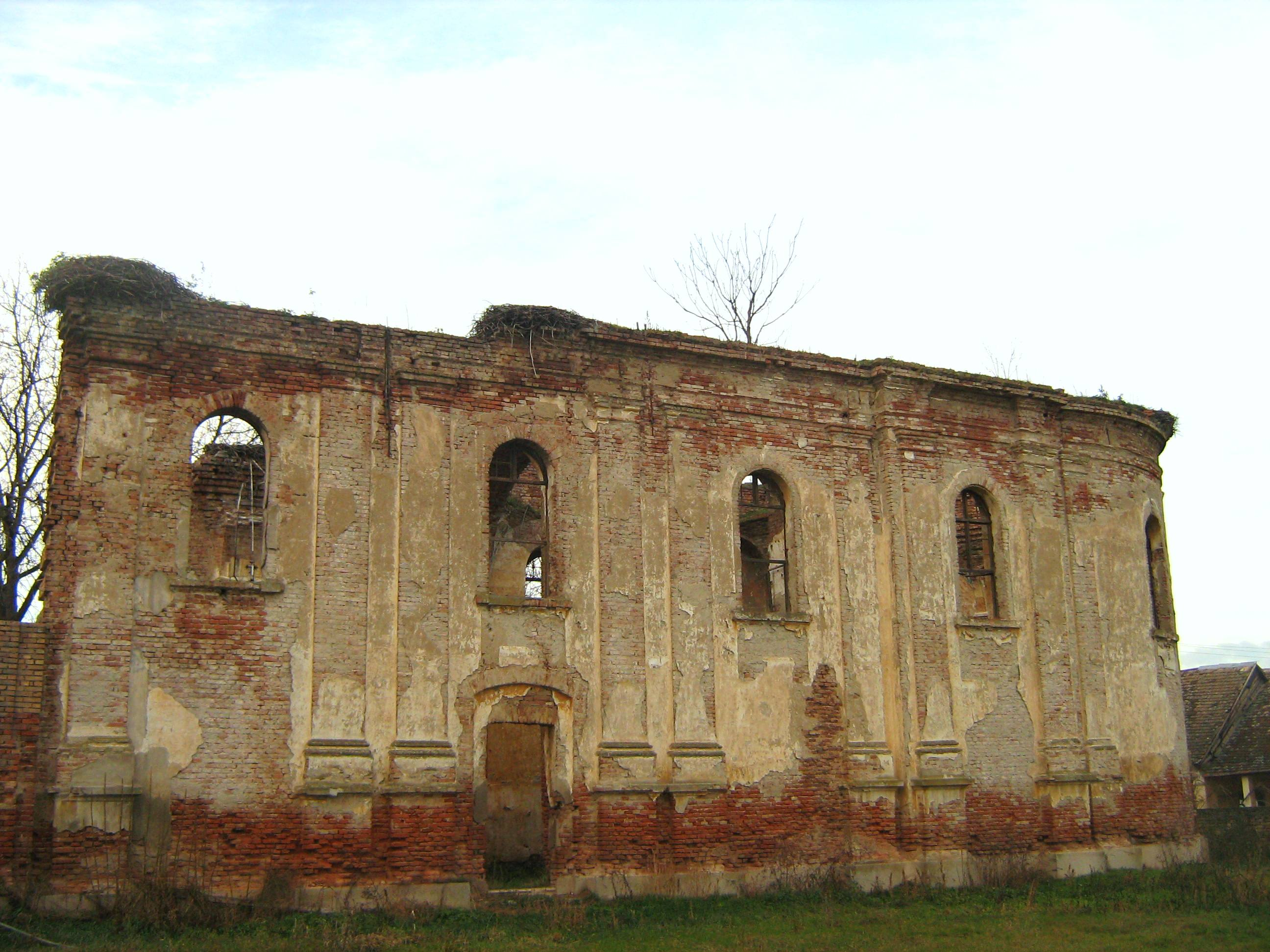
- Orthodox Church of Holy Spirit, Kupinovo
- Interactive map of Kupinovo
- Location within Vojvodina Location within Serbia Location within Europe
- Coordinates: 44°42′20.16″N 20°2′53″E
- Country: Serbia
- Province: Vojvodina
- District: Syrmia
- Municipality: Pećinci

Area
  - Total: 84.1 km^{2} (32.5 sq mi)
- Elevation: 63 m (207 ft)

Population (2011)
  - Total: 1,866
  - Density: 22.2/km^{2} (57.5/sq mi)
- Time zone: UTC+1 (CET)
  - Summer (DST): UTC+2 (CEST)

Kupinovo (Serbian Cyrillic: Купиново) is a village located in the municipality of Pećinci, Serbia. As of 2011 census, the village has 1,866 inhabitants.

It is near the famous biodiversity area, the Obedska bara. This contains several insects and other life forms unique to the area.

== Name ==
In Serbian, the village is known as Kupinovo (Serbian Cyrillic: Купиново, Glagolitic script: Ⰽⱆⱂⰻⱀⱁⰲⱁ), formerly also Kupinik (Serbian Cyrillic: Купиник, Glagolitic script: Ⰽⱆⱂⱀⰻⰽ); in Croatian as Kupinovo; and in Hungarian as Kölpény or Kelpény. The name of the village derived from Serbian word "kupina" ("blackberry" in English).

== History ==
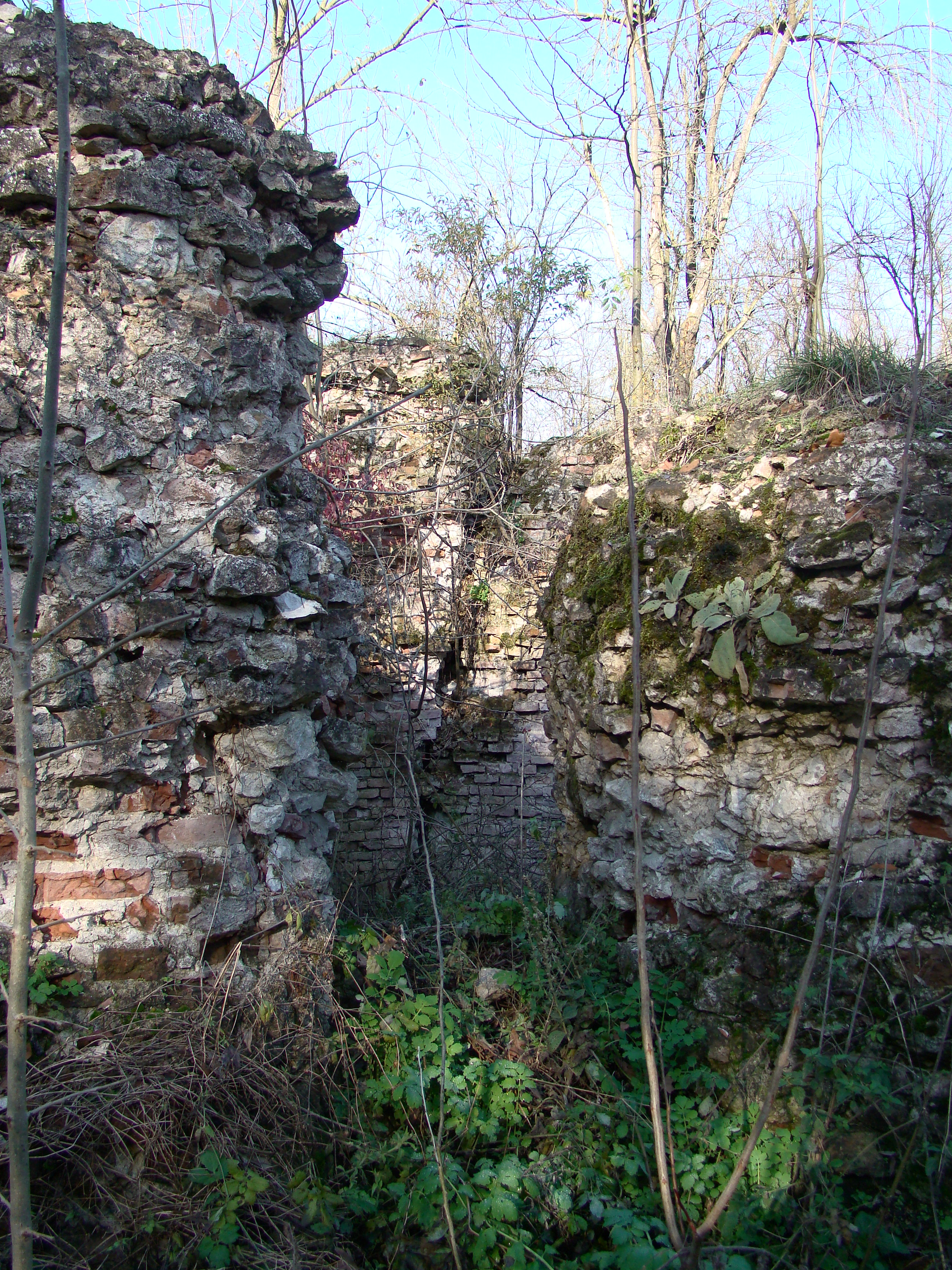
Ruins of the Kupinik fortress

In the Middle Ages, Kupinik was a notable city and was a residence of Serbian Despots in Syrmia in the 15th and 16th century. The oldest mention of Kupinik is in the two charters by the Hungarian King Sigismund, from the second half of 14th century (1387 and 1388). It was built as a military-border fortification on the border between Kingdom of Hungary and the Principality of Moravian Serbia. In the early 15th century Stefan Lazarevic, Prince of Serbia, member of the ruling Lazarević dynasty received Kupinik from the King Sigismund of Hungary. After his death, the fortress later became the seat of the Branković family. After the death of Đurađ Branković, Kupinik was once again taken over by the Hungarian King who gave it to the Berislavić family, whose members held the titular title of Despot of Serbia. The fortress was destroyed by Sultan Suleiman the Magnificent who, during his Siege of Belgrade in 1521, destroyed all other fortresses on the Sava river.

== Demographics ==
As of 2011 census results, the village has 1,866 inhabitants.

=== Historical population ===
- 1961: 2,220
- 1971: 2,057
- 1981: 2,002
- 1991: 2,009
- 2002: 2,047
- 2011: 1,866

== Notable residents ==
- Miki Đuričić, reality TV star

== See also ==
- List of places in Serbia
- List of cities, towns and villages in Vojvodina
