= Bigg Boss Kannada season 8 =

Eighth season of the reality TV series Bigg Boss Kannada

Bigg Boss Kannada
- Season 8
- Season 8 logo
- Presented by: Sudeep
- No. of days: 120
- No. of housemates: 20
- Winner: Manju Pavagada
- Runner-up: Aravind KP
- No. of episodes: 120

Release
- Original network: Colors Kannada; Voot Select
- Original release: 28 February – 8 August 2021

Series chronology
- ← Previous; Season 7 Next → Season 9

Bigg Boss 8 is the eighth season of the Indian Kannada-language version of the Big Brother reality television franchise, known as Bigg Boss, premiered on 28 February 2021. It is produced by Endemol Shine India under the control of Banijay and broadcast on Colors Kannada with Kiccha Sudeepa as the host.

The season was suspended on 8 May 2021, due to the COVID-19 pandemic. The last episode was aired after a show run for 71 days and later it continued from 23 June 2021 onwards.

Since the show was suspended due to the COVID-19 pandemic on day 71 and the day 72 resumed from 23 June 2021 onwards with a new title called Bigg Boss Second Innings and twelve non evicted contestants have entered the house to compete till the finale of the 8th season.

== Housemate status 1st Innings ==
Sr	Housemate	Day entered	Day exited	Housemates Status
1	Manju	Day 1	Day 71	Sent Home
2	Aravind	Day 1	Day 71	Sent Home
3	Divya U	Day 1	Day 68	Walked
4	Vaishnavi	Day 1	Day 71	Sent Home
5	Prashanth	Day 1	Day 71	Sent Home
6	Divya S	Day 1	Day 71	Sent Home
7	Shamanth	Day 1	Day 71	Sent Home
8	Shubha	Day 1	Day 71	Sent Home
9	Chakravarthy	Day 1	Day 71	Sent Home
10	Priyanka	Day 40	Day 71	Sent Home
11	Raghu	Day 1	Day 71	Sent Home
12	Nidhi	Day 1	Day 71	Sent Home
13	Rajeev	Day 1	Day 56	Evicted
14	Vishwanath	Day 1	Day 49	Evicted
15	Vyjayanthi	Day 40	Day 42	Walked
16	Shankar	Day 1	Day 35	Evicted
17	Chandrakala	Day 1	Day 28	Evicted
18	Geetha	Day 1	Day 21	Evicted
19	Nirmala	Day 1	Day 14	Evicted
20	Dhanushree	Day 1	Day 7	Evicted

== Housemate status 2nd Innings ==
Sr	Housemate	Day entered	Day exited	Housemates Status
1	Manju	Day 72	Day 120	Winner
2	Aravind	Day 72	Day 120	1st Runner-up
3	Divya U	Day 72	Day 120	2nd Runner-up
4	Vaishnavi	Day 72	Day 119	3rd Runner-up
5	Prashanth	Day 72	Day 119	4th Runner-up
6	Divya S	Day 72	Day 116	Evicted
7	Shamanth	Day 72	Day 112	Evicted
8	Shubha	Day 72	Day 111	Evicted
9	Chakravarthy	Day 72	Day 107	Evicted
10	Priyanka	Day 72	Day 98	Evicted
11	Raghu	Day 72	Day 91	Evicted
12	Nidhi	Day 72	Day 84	Evicted

== Telecast ==
Bigg Boss Kannada Season 8 is telecasted everyday on Colors Kannada. On the digital platform, Voot owns the show. It contains:

1. Main Episode (The main episode that is telecasted on Colors Kannada)
2. TV Ginta Modalu (Main Episode telecast before the airing on TV, only on Voot Select)
3. 24/7 Live Channel (Live telecast from Bigg Boss house, on weekdays, only on Voot Select)
4. Unseen Kathegalu (Unseen Clips, only on Voot Select)
5. Extra Masala (Extra Clips)
6. Bigg Inn (Entry Interview)
7. Bigg Bang (Exit Interview)
8. Voot Weekly (Best Compilations)
9. Voot Fryday (Special Friday Tasks)
10. Voot Video Vichara (Audience can share their views about the contestants through a video)
11. Voting

The show is most viewed on the digital platform rather than the TV platform which includes double viewership than that of the TV platform.

== Production ==
=== Delay ===
The show was going on air from October, but the eighth season get delayed due to the COVID-19 pandemic and on 15 February 2021 the channel confirmed that the show is going to launch on 28 February 2021.

=== House ===
The Bigg Boss house is built in Innovative Film City at Bidadi, Bengaluru. While the show is returning to Kannada television after a gap of a year, new norms and changes have been taken as part of safety precautions due to the ongoing COVID-19 pandemic.

=== Contestants ===
The show is sticking to the original format of the reality programme and it will only have celebrities who will be entering the house as contestants due to it is taking place amidst the COVID-19 pandemic, the makers have taken all necessary precautions to ensure a COVID-free environment for everyone involved in the production.

=== Format ===
The show follows selected contestants who are isolated from the outside world for 106 days (or 15 weeks) in a custom-built house. The housemates are dictated by an omnipresent entity named Bigg Boss. Each week, one or more of the housemates are evicted by a public vote. The last week, the housemate who gets the most votes, wins the game.

== Housemates ==
The participants of Bigg Boss Kannada Season 8 are as follows:

- Dhanushree – Social media personality
- Shubha Poonja – Film Actress
- Shankar Ashwath – Veteran Actor
- Vishwanath Haveri – Singer
- Vaishnavi Gowda – Serial Actress
- Aravind KP - biker
- Nidhi Subbaiah – Film Actress
- Shamanth Gowda – Social media personality
- Geetha Bharathi Bhat – Serial actress
- Manju Pavagada – Comedian
- Nirmala Chennappa – Actress & Director
- Raghu Gowda – YouTuber
- Divya Suresh – Actress and Model
- Divya Uruduga – Actress
- Chandrakala Mohan – Serial Actress
- Prashanth Sambargi – Businessman & Activist
- Rajeev Hanu – Actor & Cricketer

Wildcard entrants

- Chakravarthy Chandrachud - Journalist, Writer and Director
- Vyjayanthi Adiga - Actress
- Priyanka Thimmesh - Film actress

== Nominations table ==
	Week 1	Week 2	Week 3	Week 4	Week 5	Week 6	Week 7	Week 8	Week 9	Week 10		Second Innings	Week 11	Week 12	Week 13	Week 14	Week 15	Week 16		Week 17		
Nominees for House Captaincy	Shamanth; Nidhi; Dhanushree; Shubha; Nirmala	None	Chandrakala; Divya U Geetha; Manju; Raghu; Rajeev; Shankar; Shubha; Vaish; Vishwanath	Aravind; Divya S Divya U Vishwanath	Aravind; Divya U Manju; Nidhi; Prashanth; Shankar; Vishwanath	Manju; Nidhi; Prashanth; Raghu; Shubha; Vaishnavi	Aravind; Nidhi; Prashanth	Aravind; Divya S Nidhi	Rajeev; Manju; Prashanth; Raghu	Aravind; Chakravarthy; Manju		Nominees for House Captaincy	Nidhi; Prashanth; Shubha	Aravind; Divya U Manju; Priyanka; Raghu; Shamanth	Aravind; Divya U Prashanth; Chakravarthy; Shamanth; Vaishanavi	Aravind; Divya S Manju; Shamanth; Vaishnavi	Chakravarty; Divya S Divya U Manju; Shamanth	Aravind; Divya U Manju; Shamanth; Vaishnavi		No Captain		
House Captain	Shamanth		Rajeev	Aravind	Vishwanath	Manju	Prashanth	Aravind	Raghu	Chakravarthy		House Captain	Prashanth	Manju	Divya U	Aravind	Divya S	Divya U		No Captain		
Captain's Nomination	Shankar (to save)	Shubha (to evict)	Shankar (to save)	No; Nominations	Divya S (to save)	Rajeev (to evict)	Divya U (to evict)	Rajeev (to evict)	Shubha (to evict)	No; Nominations		Captain's Nomination	Nidhi; Raghu	None	Shubha (to save)	None	Manju (to save)	None				
Vote to:	Evict			None	Evict					None		Vote to:	Evict									
Manju	Rajeev; Aravind	Divya U Rajeev	Aravind; Shamanth	No; Nominations	Aravind; Vaishnavi	House; Captain	Chakravarthy; Aravind	Raghu; Divya U	Prashanth; Aravind	No; Nominations	Sent Home (Day 71)	Manju	Prashanth; Chakravarthy	House Captain	Nominated	Saved	Aravind; Vaishnavi	Saved		No; Nominations	Winner (Day 119)	
Aravind	Shankar; Divya U	Nirmala; Shankar	Divya S Shankar	House; Captain	Prashanth; Shubha	Divya S Shubha	Manju; Shubha	House; Captain	Manju; Chakravarthy	No; Nominations	Sent Home (Day 71)	Aravind	Divya S Manju	No Nominations	Nominated	House; Captain	Manju; Prashanth	Saved		No; Nominations	1st runner-up (Day 119)	
Divya U	Shankar; Manju	Nidhi; Nirmala	Divya S Shankar	No; Nominations	Shankar; Nidhi	Shamanth; Prashanth	Chakravarthy; Raghu	Manju; Divya S	Manju; Chakravarthy	No; Nominations	Walked (Day 68)	Divya U	Divya S Manju	No Nominations	House; Captain	Saved	Manju; Prashanth	House; Captain		No; Nominations	2nd runner-up (Day 119)	
Vaishnavi	Shankar; Dhanushree	Divya S Nirmala	Geetha; Shamanth	No; Nominations	Shankar; Prashanth	Shamanth; Prashanth	Vishwanath; Chakravarthy	Manju; Divya S	Prashanth; Chakravarthy	No; Nominations	Sent Home (Day 71)	Vaishnavi	Chakravarthy; Manju	No Nominations	Nominated	Nominated	Manju; Shamanth	Saved		No; Nominations	3rd runner-up (Day 118)	
Prashanth	Manju; Shankar	Divya S Nirmala	Nidhi; Shamanth	No; Nominations	Shankar; Aravind	Aravind; Shamanth	House; Captain	Manju; Divya S	Manju; Divya U	No; Nominations	Sent Home (Day 71)	Prashanth	House Captain	No Nominations	Nominated	Nominated	Divya U Shubha	Nominated		No; Nominations	4th runner-up (Day 118)	
Divya S	Shankar; Nidhi	Chandrakala; Geetha	Nidhi; Shamanth	No; Nominations	Shamanth; Nidhi	Prashanth; Shamanth	Rajeev; Vishwanath	Prashanth; Raghu	Prashanth; Shamanth	No; Nominations	Sent Home (Day 71)	Divya S	Chakravarthy; Prashanth	No Nominations	Nominated	Saved	House; Captain	Nominated		No; Nominations	Evicted (Day 115)	
Shamanth	House; Captain		Divya U Vishwanath	No; Nominations	Shankar; Divya S	Aravind; Divya S	Rajeev; Vishwanath	Divya S Rajeev	Manju; Shubha	No; Nominations	Sent Home (Day 71)	Shamanth	Manju; Raghu	No Nominations	Nominated	Saved	Divya U Shubha	Nominated		Evicted (Day 112)		
Shubha	Manju; Shankar	Nidhi; Nirmala	Nidhi; Shamanth	No; Nominations	Shankar; Shamanth	Aravind; Shamanth	Vishwanath; Chakravarthy	Prashanth; Shamanth	Prashanth; Chakravarthy	No; Nominations	Sent Home (Day 71)	Shubha	Chakravarthy; Prashanth	No Nominations	Saved	Nominated	Prashanth; Shamanth	Nominated		Evicted (Day 112)		
Chakaravarthy	Not In House					Divya S Shamanth	Rajeev; Vaishnavi	Manju; Vaishnavi	Manju; Nidhi	House; Captain	Sent Home (Day 71)	Chakravarthy	Divya S Raghu	No Nominations	Nominated	Saved	Shamanth; Shubha	Nominated	Evicted (Day 107)			
Priyanka	Not In House						Vishwanath; Nidhi	Prashanth; Vaishnavi	Manju; Aravind	No; Nominations	Sent Home (Day 71)	Priyanka	Nidhi; Raghu	No Nominations	Nominated	Nominated	Evicted (Day 98)					
Raghu	Shankar; Manju	Prashanth; Vishwanath	Geetha; Shamanth	No; Nominations	Shamanth; Manju	Shamanth; Aravind	Vishwanath; Chakravarthy	Divya S Priyanka	House; Captain	No; Nominations	Sent Home (Day 71)	Raghu	Prashanth; Chakravarthy	No Nominations	Nominated	Evicted (Day 91)						
Nidhi	Shankar; Manju	Divya S Prashanth	Divya U Vishwanath	No; Nominations	Shankar; Divya S	Aravind; Raghu	Aravind; Divya S	Prashanth; Chakravarthy	Prashanth; Chakravarthy	No; Nominations	Sent Home (Day 71)	Nidhi	Prashanth; Priyanka	No Nominations	Evicted (Day 84)							
Rajeev	Dhanushree; Manju	Geetha; Nirmala	House; Captain	No; Nominations	Divya S Divya U	Shamanth; Prashanth	Manju; Divya U	Manju; Divya S	Evicted (Day 56)			Rajeev	Evicted (Day 56)									
Vishwanath	Shankar; Dhanushree	Nirmala; Prashant	Nidhi; Shamanth	No; Nominations	House; Captain	Subha; Rajeev	Manju; Divya S	Evicted (Day 49)				Vishwanath	Evicted (Day 49)									
Vyjayanthi	Not In House						Walked (Day 42)					Vyjayanthi	Walked (Day 42)									
Shankar	Dhanushree; Geetha	Divya S Prashanth	Nidhi; Raghu	No; Nominations	Prashanth; Shubha	Evicted (Day 35)						Shankar	Evicted (Day 35)									
Chandrakala	Shankar; Nidhi	Divya S Vishwanath	Nidhi; Raghu	No; Nominations	Evicted (Day 28)							Chandrakala	Evicted (Day 28)									
Geetha	Shankar; Prashanth	Nirmala; Prashanth	Aravind; Shamanth	Evicted (Day 21)								Geetha	Evicted (Day 21)									
Nirmala	Prashanth; Dhanushree	Chandrakala; Geetha	Evicted (Day 14)									Nirmala	Evicted (Day 14)									
Dhanushree	Nidhi; Shankar	Evicted (Day 7)										Dhanushree	Evicted (Day 7)									
Notes												Notes										
Against Public Vote	Dhanushree; Nirmala; Raghu; Shubha; Vishwanath	Chandrakala; Divya S Geetha; Nidhi; Nirmala; Prashanth; Shubha; Vishwanath	Aravind; Divya S Divya U Geetha; Nidhi; Prashanth; Raghu; Shamanth; Vishwanath	Chandrakala; Divya S Divya U Manju; Nidhi; Prashanth; Raghu; Rajeev; Shamanth; Shankar; Shubha; Vaishnavi; Vishwanath	Aravind; Nidhi; Prashanth; Shankar; Shamanth; Shubha	Aravind; Divya S Nidhi; Prashanth; Rajeev; Shamanth; Shubha	Aravind; Chakravarthy; Divya S Divya U Manju; Rajeev; Shamanth; Vishwanath	Divya S Manju; Prashanth; Raghu; Rajeev; Vaishnavi	Aravind; Chakravarty; Divya S Manju; Prashanth; Priyanka	Aravind; Divya S Manju; Prashanth; Priyanka	None	Against Public Vote	Prashanth; Chakravarthy; Raghu; Manju; Divya S Nidhi; Priyanka		Aravind; Chakravarthy; Divya S Manju; Prashanth; Priyanka; Raghu; Shamanth; Vaishnavi	Prashanth; Priyanka; Shubha; Vaishnavi	Chakravarthy; Divya U Prashanth; Shamanth; Shubha	Chakravarthy; Divya U Prashanth; Shamanth; Shubha		Aravind; Divya S Divya U Manju; Prashanth; Vaishnavi	Aravind; Divya U Manju; Prashanth; Vaishnavi	
Re-entered	None											Re-entered	Divya U	None								
Walked	None					Vyajyanthi	None			Divya U	None	Walked	None									
Evicted	Dhanushree	Nirmala	Geetha	Chandrakala	Shankar	~~Shamanth~~	Vishwanath	Rajeev	No; Eviction			Evicted	No; Eviction	Nidhi	Raghu	Priyanka	No; Eviction	Chakravarthy	Shubha	Divya S	Prashanth	Vaishnavi
Evicted	Dhanushree	Nirmala	Geetha	Chandrakala	Shankar	~~Shamanth~~	Vishwanath	Rajeev	No; Eviction			Evicted	No; Eviction	Nidhi	Raghu	Priyanka	No; Eviction	Chakravarthy	Shamanth	Divya S	Divya U	
Evicted	Dhanushree	Nirmala	Geetha	Chandrakala	Shankar	~~Shamanth~~	Vishwanath	Rajeev	No; Eviction			Evicted	No; Eviction	Nidhi	Raghu	Priyanka	No; Eviction	Chakravarthy	Shamanth	Divya S	Aravind	Manju
