= Przyluski =

Przyluski may refer to:

== Places ==
=== Przyłuski ===
- Przyłuski, Gmina Biała Rawska, central Poland
- Przyłuski, Gmina Sadkowice, central Poland

=== Przyłuki ===
- Przyłuki, Gmina Międzyrzec Podlaski

== People ==
- Przyłuski (surname), a family name

== See also ==
- Przylaski (disambiguation)
