= Heinrich Fleißner =

German politician

Heinrich Fleissner (born 27 May 1888 in Hirschberg, Thuringia, died 22 April 1959 in Leipzig) was a German politician (USPD / SPD / SED), and chief of police in Leipzig.

== Life ==
Fleißner was born the son of a tanner in Hirschberg an der Saale as one of eight children. He attended elementary school and was followed by a glazier apprenticeship. In 1905, at 17 years old, he joined the SPD and the trade union federation of glaziers. From 1905 to 1908 he regularly attended the party and trade union training for his knowledge of the principles of social democracy to deepen.

== Policy and work ==
In 1909 he settled in Leipzig. He found work as a storekeeper in the co-op Zwenkau. Later became the head of the stores in Eythra and Lobstädt. In Lobstädt he founded the first local association SPD.

From 1916 to 1918 he was employed during the First World War on the Western Front as a driver in the artillery. In 1918 he returned to Leipzig, where he became a member of the USPD, where he quickly gained influence. Already in the spring of 1919 Richard Lipinski took him to the county party secretary. Fleißner returned to the SPD in 1920 and became editor of the Leipziger Volkszeitung. From 1921 to 1923 he was a city councilor, and taught himself essentially a finance committee. Fleißner was 1922 Chairman of the District Board of Leipzig SPD. In March / April 1923 Fleißner was appointed by the Prime Minister Erich Zeigner of Police in Leipzig. This office was held until 1933.

After the takeover by the Nazis lost Fleißner his office in March 1933. Unmittbar after his release, he was on 4 April to 20 Taken into protective custody in May 1933. After that he was unemployed for several months before he took a job at an insurance company in 1934. In 1937 he became manager of a bakery operation of his son.

In 1935 he became attached to the by Stanislaw Trabalski led, illegal District Board of the SPD. Above all, Fleissner it was thanks to them that after a brief, joint custody with Erich Zeigner and Stanislaw Trabalski (November / December 1939) contacts with social-democratic-minded friends like Carlo Mierendorff and Leber to Berlin and to the liberal-conservative opposition circle around him personally known, former mayor of Leipzig Carl Friedrich Goerdeler could be included. After the failed assassination attempt of 20 July 1944, Adolf Hitler was once again at the next Stanislaw Trabalski, Fleißner, Erich Zeigner, Leipzig and other social democrats 22 July 1944 in Sachsenhausen concentration camp abducted in which he rose to the second October 1944 remained.

== Postwar ==
On 19 April 1945, he was able to return by U.S. occupation authorities back in the office of Chief of Police. However, it was this office immediately after the takeover by the SMA on 2 July 1945 be withdrawn. After the forced merger of the SPD and the KPD into the SED Fleissner was only an ordinary member of the party. As part of the ongoing Stalinization in the following years, he was on 15 April 1951, as a "hireling of American capital," expelled from the party. In the conviction that this socialist unity party is doomed, Fleissner died of a heart attack on 22 April 1959 in his Leipzig home.

== Literature ==
Mike Schmeitzner: Heinrich Fleißner (1888–1959): Social Democratic continuity of the Empire to the GDR, in: Such pests are also in Leipzig, Frankfurt am Main [u.a.], 1997; ISBN 3-631-47385-0, S. 69–85.
