= Karl Trabalski =

German politician (1923–2009)

Member of the Landtag of North Rhine-Westphalia
- In office 1966–1990

Personal details
- Born: 16 May 1923 Leipzig, Germany
- Died: 5 December 2009 (aged 86) Düsseldorf, Germany
- Party: Social Democratic Party of Germany
- Relations: Franciszek Trąbalski (grandfather); Richard Lipinski (grandfather)
- Parent: Stanislaw Trabalski

Karl Trabalski (16 May 1923 – 5 December 2009) was a German politician and former Member of Parliament (Social Democratic Party, SPD). His father was Stanislaw Trabalski, the last SPD mayor of Leipzig in 1946. He is the grandson of Franciszek Trąbalski and Richard Lipinski.

== Life and career ==
Trabalski was born in Leipzig and attended the Herder upper secondary school in Leipzig. During the Nazi era, he was the only student who did not join the Hitler Youth. After completing high school, he studied philosophy, political science, business and sociology at the University of Leipzig. However, when the communists arrested his father without cause in 1948, he abandoned his studies and as the eldest son of the family, provided for the family. Because of his social-democratic views and statements regarding the Soviet Union, Trabalski was to be sentenced in a show trial. However, he left as a political refugee in 1951, went to the West, and completed his studies in Cologne, graduating with a master's in business administration. After graduation, he worked for the German Trade Union Confederation. He then worked as a business economist in industry and the housing sector. From 1960 to 1988, he was a member of the Düsseldorf-Ost housing association board. In 1952 he joined the Trade, Banking and Insurance Union.

Trabalski died in Düsseldorf in 2009.

== Deputy ==
From 24 July 1966 to 30 May 1990, Trabalski was a member of the state parliament of North Rhine-Westphalia. He was directly elected in constituency 45 (Düsseldorf II); only in the 8th legislative period did he enter the state parliament via the state list (list position 20) of his party.

On 5 March 1969, 23 May 1979, and 23 May 1984, he was a member of the Federal Assembly for the election of the federal president.

== Other ==
Trabalski also gained attention through his work as head of the Leipzig Housing and Construction Company. As general manager, he came in the crossfire of the Social Democratic city government and the CDU board. Two weeks after firing Trabalski, mayor Hinrich Lehmann-Grube (SPD) said: "We can not accuse Mr. Trabalski of wrongful conduct."

== Volunteering ==
- 1958–2003 – workers' welfare association offices and activities, Düsseldorf
  He was a member of the workers' welfare association for over 45 years. In 1992, after the death of his wife Ursula Trabalski, he became the chair of the local association in Gerresheim. In 2003 he was appointed honorary chairman of the local association.
  Influenced by his own experience, Trabalski was committed to helping displaced persons, refugees and immigrants. For this, he was awarded the Order of Merit of North Rhine-Westphalia.
- 1966–1986 – German Red Cross, Düsseldorf
