= Gogolin (disambiguation) =

Gogolin may refer to the following places:

- Gogolin, Bydgoszcz County in Kuyavian-Pomeranian Voivodeship (north-central Poland)
- Gogolin, Grudziądz County in Kuyavian-Pomeranian Voivodeship (north-central Poland)
- Gogolin in Opole Voivodeship (south-west Poland)
- Gogolin, Łódź Voivodeship (central Poland)
