= Zaborze =

Zaborze may refer to several villages in Poland:

- Zaborze, Greater Poland Voivodeship (west-central Poland)
- Zaborze, Kraków County in Lesser Poland Voivodeship (south Poland)
- Zaborze, Oświęcim County in Lesser Poland Voivodeship (south Poland)
- Zaborze, Łódź Voivodeship (central Poland)
- Zaborze, Lublin Voivodeship (east Poland)
- Zaborze, Łosice County in Masovian Voivodeship (east-central Poland)
- Zaborze, Gmina Nasielsk, Nowy Dwór County in Masovian Voivodeship (east-central Poland)
- Zaborze, Pułtusk County in Masovian Voivodeship (east-central Poland)
- Zaborze, Cieszyn County in Silesian Voivodeship (south Poland)
- Zaborze, Myszków County in Silesian Voivodeship (south Poland)
- Zaborze, Busko County in Świętokrzyskie Voivodeship (south-central Poland)
- Zaborze, Kielce County in Świętokrzyskie Voivodeship (south-central Poland)
- Zaborze, Gryfino County in West Pomeranian Voivodeship (north-west Poland)
- Zaborze, Świdwin County in West Pomeranian Voivodeship (north-west Poland)
- Zaborze, Zabrze, now part of the city of Zabrze in Silesian Voivodeship (south Poland)
