= Franciszek Trąbalski =

Polish politician

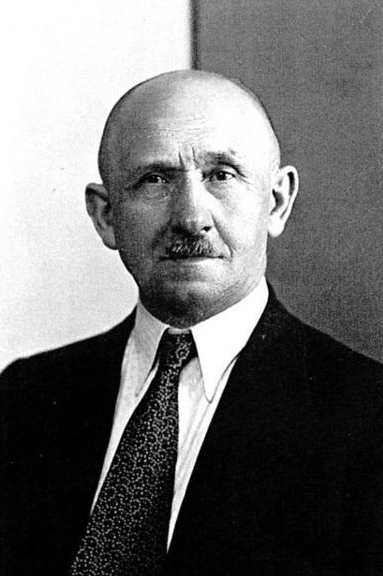
- Franciszek Trąbalski on February 4, 1947

Acting President of Poland
- In office 4 February 1947 Serving with Władysław Raczkiewicz (in exile)
- Prime Minister: Edward Osóbka-Morawski
- Preceded by: Bolesław Bierut (as President of the State National Council)
- Succeeded by: Władysław Kowalski (acting)

Personal details
- Born: 10 October 1870 Karlshausen, Kingdom of Prussia, German Empire now Czempiń, Poland
- Died: 27 July 1964 (aged 93) Zabrze, Poland
- Party: Polish Socialist Party (until 1948); Polish United Workers' Party (from 1948)

Franciszek Trąbalski (10 October 1870 – 26 July 1964) was a Polish socialist politician and a longtime member of the Polish Socialist Party (PPS).

== Life ==
Franciszek Trąbalski, called Francis, was with Mary, born Mackowiak married. He was the father of Stanislaw Trabalski and the grandfather of Charles Trabalski. His grave is located in the cemetery of the parish of St. Joseph in Zabrze, the former Hindenburg of Upper Silesia. Francis had a friendly relationship with Richard Lipinski, whom he had met in Leipzig. Their children, Lipinski's daughter Margaret and Trabalski`s son Stanislaw Trabalski, married in 1921.

=== Education ===
Francis attended the German School in Srem, where he passed the matriculation examination. After school he went to the higher trade school to study. In order to finance this, he worked in the commercial sector, and gave private lessons. At the same time he learned the "proper job" of shoemaker.

=== Profession ===
End of 1888, he opened to defray the living expenses for his family, a shoemaker in Leipzig. The shoemakers' guild, which over the influx of Poles was not pleased forced the closure of his shop. Now he was working in the basement of his house in the Poniatowskistraße. In addition to his political duties Trąbalski worked part-time in between 1894 and 1896 as a teacher of Polish small schools in Leipzig. After the birth of his son Stanislaw he took a job as a city official. In 1899 he published in the newspaper workers, supported by the SPD, Robotnicza Gazeta, first article.

=== Political career ===
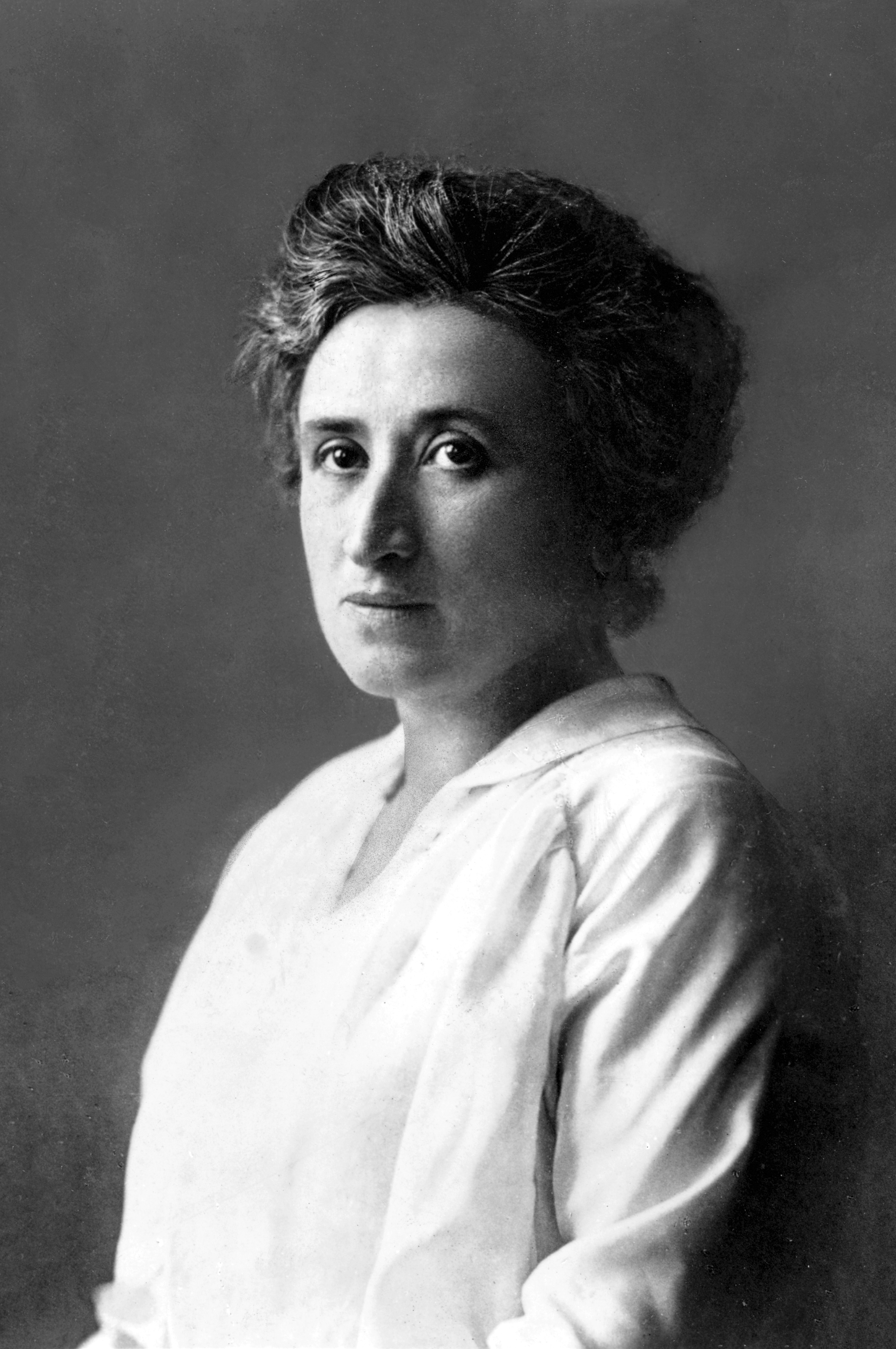
Rosa Luxemburg

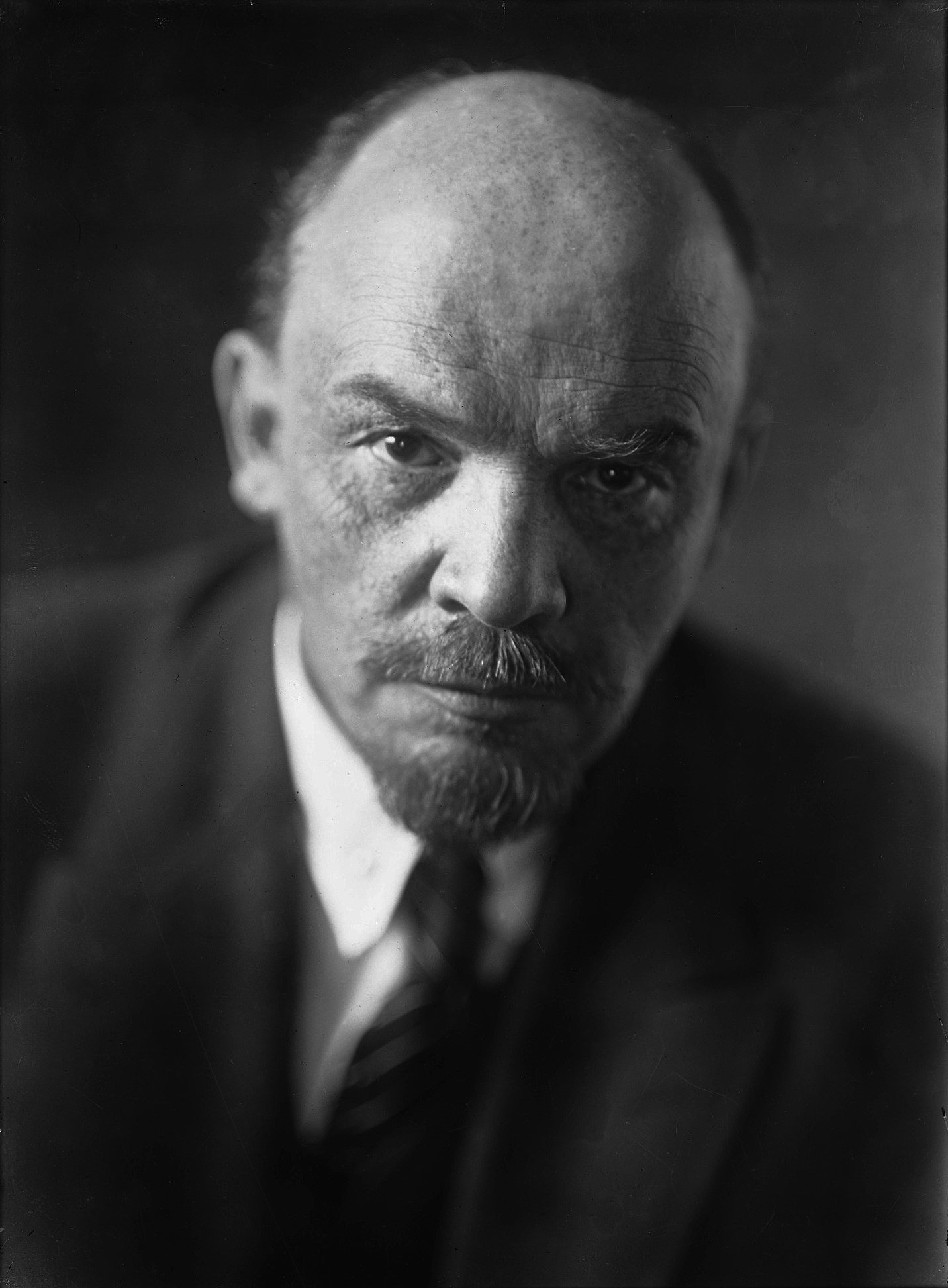
Vladimir Lenin, 1920

Already in his early youth he was interested in politics. From a young age, he distributed leaflets which was called on to resist the Prussian Germanization, against the forcible introduction of the German language in Poland, now in the Prussian province. His efforts were supported among others by Rosa Luxemburg, Ludwik Warynski, Felix Dzerzhinsky and Julian Balthasar Marchlewski. When he was threatened with arrest, the 18-year-old fled his native Czempin, first to Berlin, later on Halle to Leipzig. Trąbalski made contact with German social democrats, including August Bebel, Johann Karl Pinkau, George Schoepflin, and particularly Wilhelm Liebknecht, with whom he had a friendly relationship. Francis was still in the same year (1898) in the Polish choir in Leipzig, behind which was hidden because of the still prevailing socialist law, an illegal socialist organization. As Francis until the abolition of the socialist law for the courier services in neighboring Borsdorf living Wilhelm Liebknecht took over, he also met his son, Karl Liebknecht. In this organization were, inter alia, Rosa Luxemburg in 1900, Hugo Haase and Lenin, who, when he was staying in Leipzig, attended Trabalski. Immediately after the fall of the socialist law, Franz took effect on 1 October 1890 the SPD again legally operating at. With the beginning of 1891 he was also a member of the recently founded in Berlin in Germany of Polish Socialist Party (TSP). In 1901 he was persuaded by the comrades to Katowice in Upper Silesia, to move to the corner of the Three Emperors (Germany, Austria-Hungary and Russia). Another such point of contact, he set up in Kaliningrad, has been placed in refugee money, passports and other available. This meeting was called Koenigsberg process known in the Karl Liebknecht appeared as a defender Trabalskis. Trabalski worked there as a party secretary.

== Political offices ==
In 1893 he became leader of the Polish socialists in Leipzig. In the same year he joined the PPS. From 1906 to 1909 he was secretary of the party executive in the Prussian part of Poland. 1922 to 1939 served as the leader of all Trąbalski Polish Socialists in Germany. In addition, (1922-1937) he was chief editor of "Głosu Ludu" (Voice of the People) and "Związkowiec" (Union). After the Second World War he was a leader of the PPS (Polish Socialist Party) in Silesia, and from 1945 to 1948 he was a member of the party leadership. From 1947 to 1952 he was a member of the Sejm and served as a senior marshal at the beginning (as the oldest MP). During his long-standing commitment to public service, he was head of the Polish socialist movement in Germany, Member of Parliament, Senior Marshal, and in his capacity as Sejm Marshal pro tempore due to seniority, he served for one day on 4 February 1947 as acting head of the Polish state, as temporary president of the National Council of State (Head of State at that time). After the PPS and the PPR 1948 (by the Soviet-backed Communist Party) were united, he became a member of the new Polish United Workers' Party.

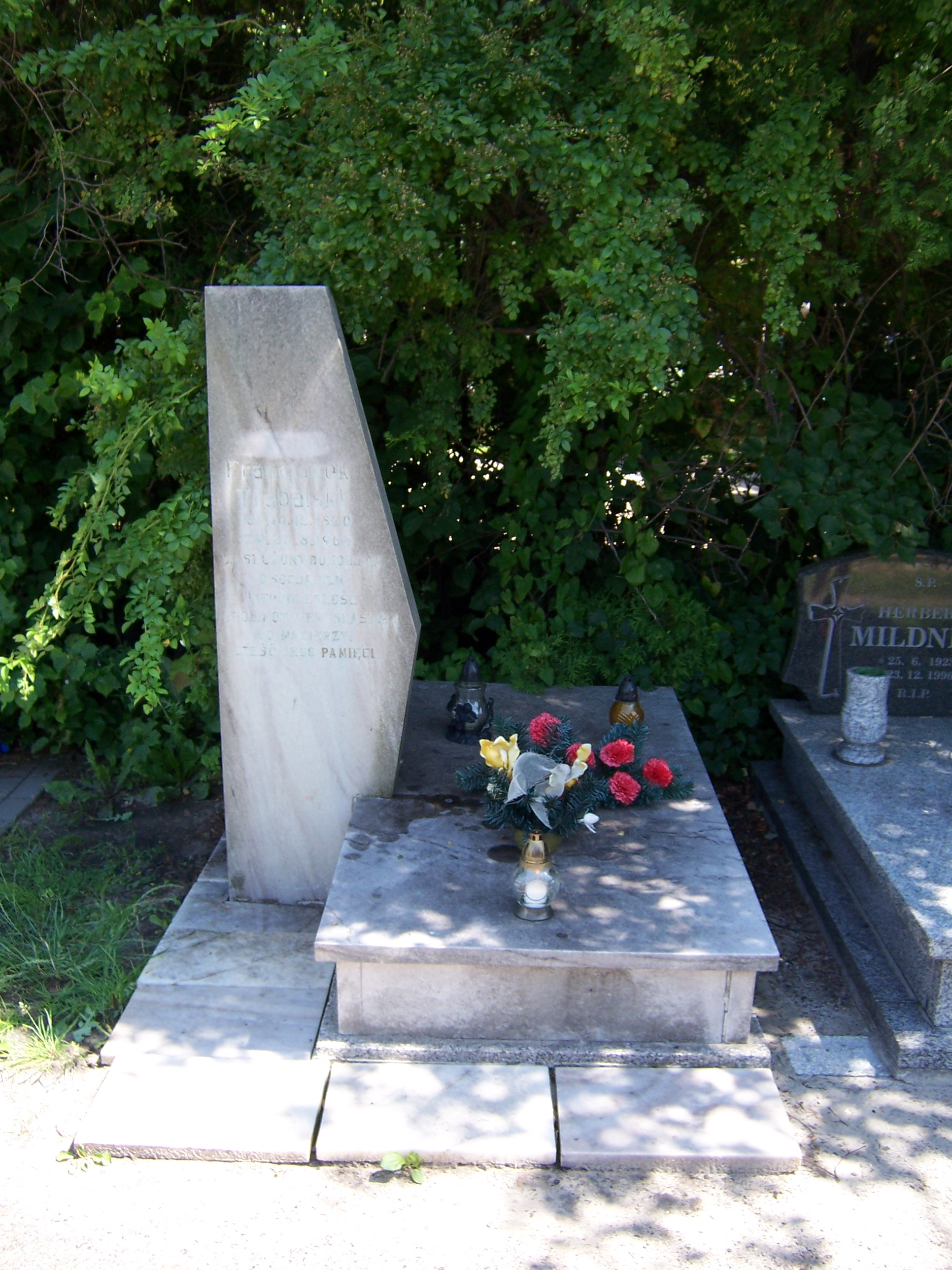
Grace of Franciszek Trąbalski

== Honors ==
In the Polish city of Zabrze is a street named after him: Prezydenta Franciszka Trąbalskiego.

== Publications ==
Parallel to his journalism, has developed his literary activity. Social policy issues were initially in the foreground. Trąbalski was the author of numerous political and socio-political writings, such as:

- Half a century of socialism in Polish Silesia, 1947

== Literature ==
- Mike Schmeitzner/Michael Rudloff: Geschichte der Sozialdemokratie im Sächsischen Landtag. In: Beiträge zur Geschichte der Arbeiterbewegung, trafo verlag, Berlin 40. Jahrgang 1998, ISSN 0942-3060
- Michael Rudloff: Eine Biographie zwischen den Systemen; In: Solche Schädlinge gibt es auch in Leipzig, Frankfurt am Main [u.a.], 1997; ISBN 3-631-47385-0. S. 13–27.
- Leksykon historii Polski z 1995
- Universal Encyclopaedia PWN (tom 4) z 1976
- Zbigniew Gołasz, Franciszek Trąbalski i jego broszura "Barbarzyński mord w Katyniu", w: "Kroniki Miasta Zabrza" nr 2/2010
- Zbigniew Gołasz, Zapomniany prezydent, "Nasze Zabrze Samorządowe" nr 10/2007
- Zbigniew Gołasz, Franciszek Trąbalski, Strażnik prawdy o Katyniu, "Nasze Zabrze Samorządowe" nr 4/2010
- Zbigniew Kantyka, Franciszek Trąbalski, (1870-1964) Dzialacz ruchu socjalistycznego, Katowice 1985

Political offices
Preceded by Bolesław Bierut	Acting President of Poland; 1947	Succeeded by Władysław Kowalski
