= Stanislaw Trabalski =

German politician

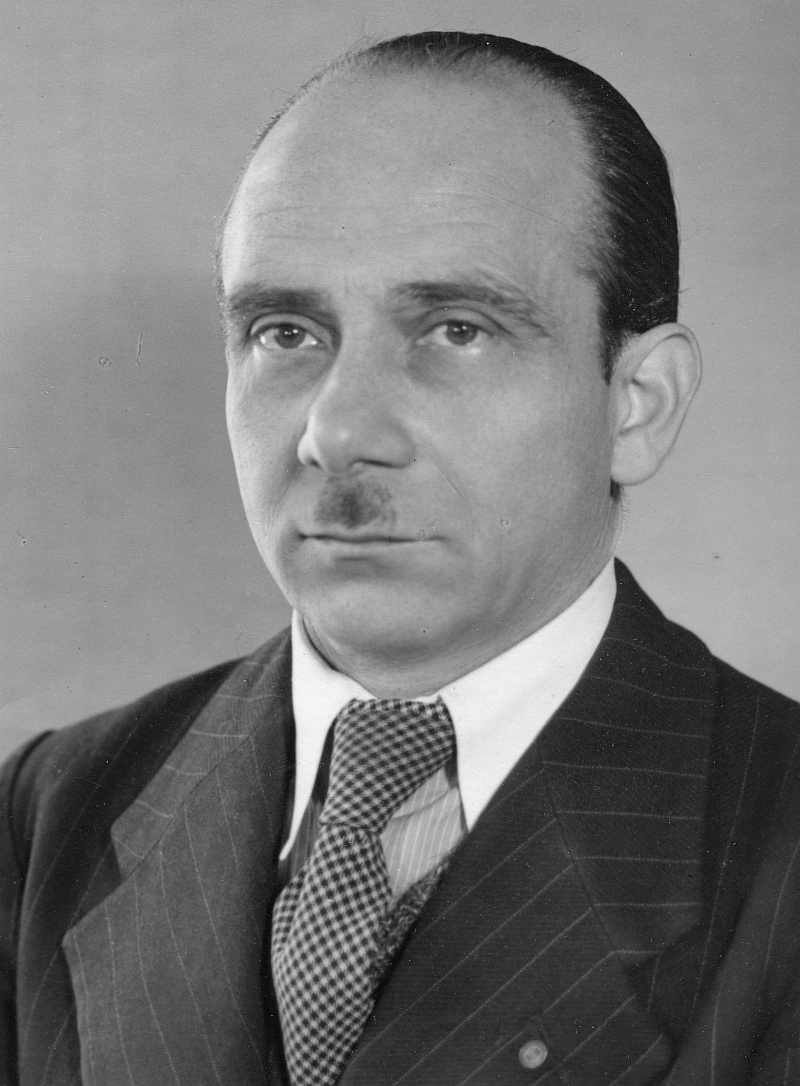
- Familienarchiv 1958
- Born: Stanislaw Bronislaw Boleslaw Trabalski; 25 October 1896; Leipzig, Saxony, German Empire
- Died: 12 November 1985 (aged 89); Leipzig, East Germany
- Occupation: Politician
- Children: 7, including Karl Trabalski

Stanislaw Bronislaw Boleslaw Trabalski (25 October 1896 – 12 November 1985) was a German politician (SPD, USPD, SED).

== Life ==
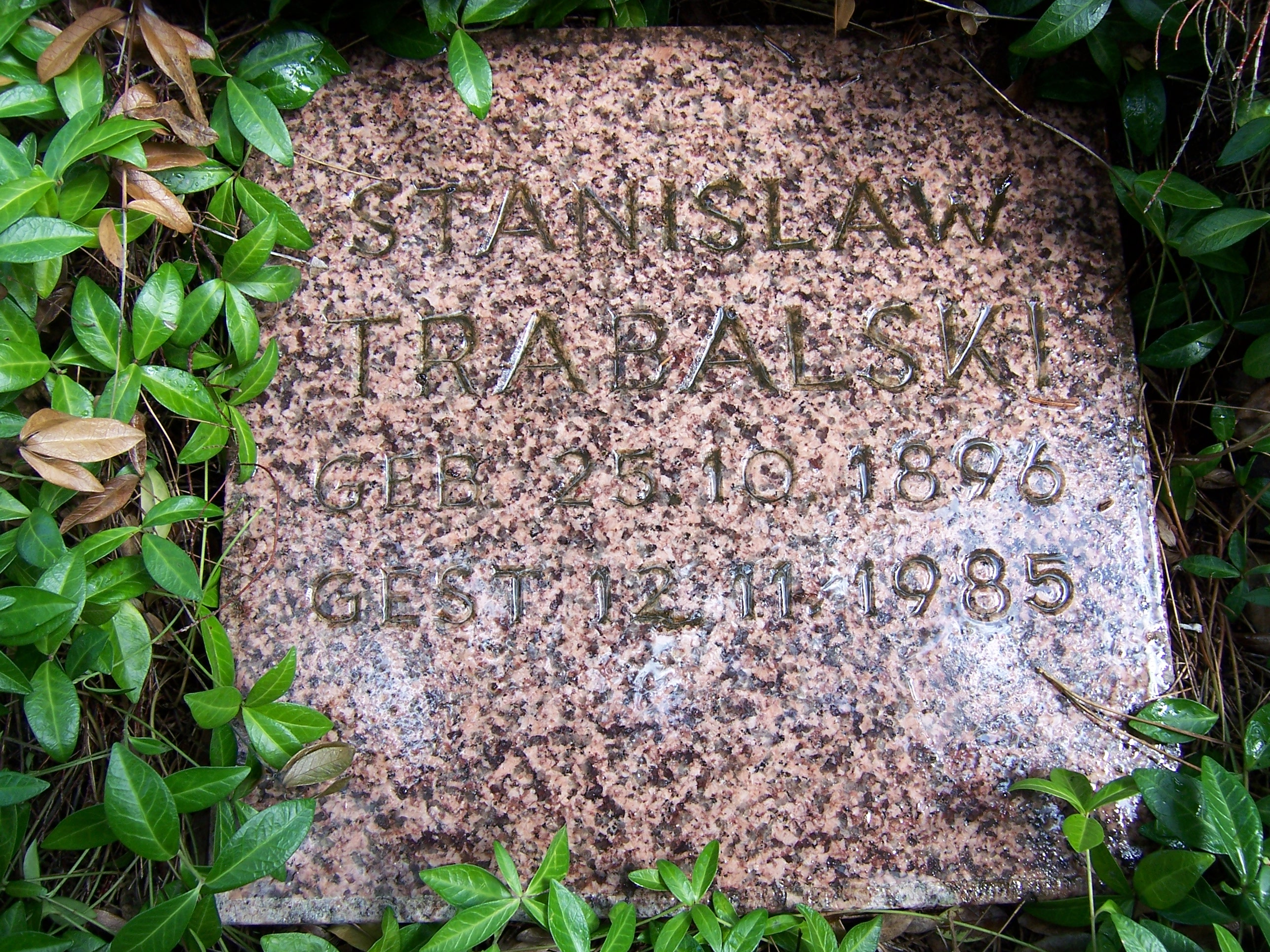
Stanislaw Trabalskis grave stone at the South Cemetery Leipzig

His parents, Franciszek Trabalski and Maria Trąbalski, born Mackowiack, had immigrated from Poland in 1888. His father was active already active in Poland as a socialist. In 1901 he moved with his parents returned to Poland Katowice. From 1902 Stanislav visited the middle and high school. Even at that young age he realized how detrimental can be a household name because he was labeled due to the political activities of his father as a "stranger, and Red." His teachers, the Catholic priest and former sergeant, he held bad memories. Since his father since 28 December 1902 the newspaper "Gazzetta Robotnica" had brought out, and Stanislaw, like all other family members also help in producing the newspaper. As early as age nine, he was sometimes used to quite delicate tasks. So he did, for example, a call to the crouching soldiers not to participate in the battles of the Revolution, smuggled into the barracks. The growing to-do Cossacks did not suspect that a child would be used for such tasks. In 1912 the family returned to Leipzig. Since his parents not afford the school fees for another visit to the school where he was forced to look for an apprenticeship. The dues to be paid monthly by Stanislaw 300 marks had to be on the weekends through temporary jobs earn as a projectionist in some movie theaters in Leipzig. On 15 December 1915 he received the draft for military service. He had a short basic training in the 7th Telegraph Battalion in Dresden, to the Western Front. Here he was commanded to a technical unit. Amid hail of grenade he had to telephone lines that were shot repeatedly repaired. When he was witness to an inhuman endurance command, he was able to thwart its implementation by means of capping a telephone line. On 6 June 1916 in the "Hell of Verdun," he was wounded by a grenade in the leg. A planned amputation, he was able to withdraw and came to a Kriegslazaret to Weimar. On 30 June 1917 he was discharged as unfit for service. Then he worked as an auditor for counter Thuringia. When he interfered with officers staff the food profiteering, he was released. Finally he found a job at Carl Zeiss in Jena. In 1919, after a brief stay in Leipzig, the revolutionary turned Trabalski Center, Berlin. There, he volunteered on behalf of his Leipzig colleagues at the former People's Representatives Emil Barth where he could live for some time. The demilitarization Ordinance from the government forced him back to Leipzig, where he was obliged to resume the labour in which he was engaged on the day war broke out. In 1921 he married Margaret Lipinski, the daughter of Richard Lipinski. 1923, his son Charles Trabalski was born, who was later to become member of the parliament for the SPD in North Rhine-Westphalia. Trabalski was the father of seven children. Stanislav's grave is located on the southern cemetery Leipzig.

== Political career ==
Trabalski 1909 was a member of the youth workers in Katowice, 1912, the entry made in the SPD. 1914 to 1916 he completed his military service and was wounded. In 1916 Trabalski became a member of the Spartacus League, in 1917, he joined the USPD, 1922 back to the SPD. In 1918 he became a member of the Workers' and Soldiers in Weimar and Leipzig in 1919.

In his politically active period between the world wars was Trabalski also volunteer workers in the Education Institute, such as 1928-1933 Secretary of the consumer co-Plagwitz Leipzig and 1932/1933 Member of the Iron front in the fight against the Nazis. In the period from 1933 to 1945 he was arrested seven times. During the months of October and November 1939 he was arrested together with Erich Schilling and Heinrich Fleißner. There were procedures for high-treason, but were adjusted. Among other things, he spent 6 weeks in the Sachsenhausen concentration camp inhaftiert. Trabalski it was mainly due to Fleissner, according to their joint custody, contacts with social-democratic-minded friends like Carlo Mierendorff and Julius Leber produce liver in Berlin. In early 1944, and said Trabalski and Fleißner the former mayor of Leipzig, Carl Friedrich Goerdeler, assist him in removing the NAZI Regimges. They demanded beside the military coup and the elimination of Nazi dictatorship, a "co-determination rights of the workers in all state and economic functions." After the failed attempt to assassinate Hitler on 20 July 1944 Trabalski, Fleißner, Erich Zeigner and other Leipzig Solzialdemokraten were deported again in the Sachsenhausen concentration camp.

== Post-war period ==
On 3 July 1945, Trabalski chosen as co-founder of the SPD in Saxony, as chairman of the SPD district board of Saxony, in 1946 he was a member of the SED District Board West Saxons, although he felt massive resentment against the forced merger of the SPD and the KPD into the SED. His fiercest opponent was Otto Buchwitz, who called him "Krawalski". Together with Rudolf Eckert Frederick Rudolph and Felix Kaden he defended himself against Bolshevism. In an interview with Paul Lobe, in autumn 1945, he shared this with, however, that for fear of arrest by the Soviets of 20,000 Social Democrats, the Social Democratic leadership not able see the unification process to counter resistance. Even as the Nazis was also Stanislaw Trabalski the Stalinist SED critics as a nuisance. Therefore, it granted in 1948 and placed it in front of his house "because of threat to world peace" court. He was still first parity Chairman of the SED district leadership. Until 1948 he was a member of the SED state secretariat and was responsible for the party establishments. In October 1948, was arrested for Trabalski and a half years on 1 November 1950 in the border re-arrested. Until 1954 followed the conviction: Due to the offense of "war and boycott agitation", he received six and a half years in prison but was pardoned in 1956 by an initiative of the British Labour Party. Then he no longer engaged in political offices. He became a member of the Bibliographical Institute in Leipzig, but was further observed and repeatedly arrested. Operate as well as to last from 1960 to 1961 for alleged "social democracy". A total of eight years, he sat for his political convictions in the Bautzen prison, Waldheim, Sachsenhausen and Bützow.

== Legal processing ==
The sentence of 29 April 1954, in which he was sentenced to sechseinhal years in prison, is at the request of his son Charles Trabalski by the 30th District Court of Rostock September 1996, was repealed as unconstitutional the state law

=== Rehabilitation ===
The newly established, emerged from the SED to PDS - Today "The Left", decided at a meeting on 20–21 January 1990, among other things, people who the bloody terror of Stalin in the Soviet Union have fallen victim to rehabilitate. The Arbitration Commission of the PDS has rehabilitated 48 people politically, who suffered under Stalinist persecution and imprisonment, or been murdered. "In the interest of the renewal of the party and on the basis of the then applicable statute lift all sanctions in the past expressed party." Furthermore, subjects who received the late 40s and early 50s of the 20th Century excluded because of their past affiliation with the SPD under the stigma of "social democracy" as a so-called Schumacher agents from the SED and arrested, or in connection with the fictional spy, Noel Field, and the Stalinist show trials in Hungary against László Rajk and others in Bulgaria Traicho Kostov and against others and against Rudolf Slánský in Czechoslovakia, and others were also persecuted by the SED as alleged agents of imperialism or imprisoned. These include, among others rehabilitated a total of 28: Leo Bauer, Alfred Drögemüller, Max Emendörfer, and Willi Kreikemeyer

== Quotations ==
On 20 November 1952, when Stanislaw was imprisoned in Berlin Hohenschönhausen, the so-called U-boat prison, he wrote in a letter:

[...] I was bullied difficult [...]. To my family, I could not write since my arrest. Have said that I had fled to the West. [...] It was more cruel than the Nazis.

Here are the most difficult time of my stay began with the goal to get me to die. Cells in the basement with no windows hot to 45 degrees with built-noise apparatus of cells with double bunks about 1.20 m long and cold air intake [...] no sleep or nod of the day; cell checks every three minutes. By the end of June 1953 all medical treatment was withheld.

Newly elected as district chairman of the SPD on 26 August 1945 in his opening speech, quoted from Harold Hurwitz: The political culture of the population and the new beginning of conservative politics, Volume 4, Part 1

However regrettable it is that we were not able to take power themselves, but I must still find that Nazism would have been even without the arrival of the Allies in Germany can not last long.

From an interview with Beatrix Bouvier Wrede of 22 November 1973

Although I was against the principle of association, were my motives for the continued partisan cooperation as follows: I was standing in front of the other problem on a regional party, the party dissolved. Heinrich Fleissner warned against this risk was unt it really helps that the district board agreed to the merger date. Fleissner said that a party resolution was not to answer, because otherwise detained thousands of officials. The former camp had a very high mortality rate, so that was also uncertain whether the Funtionäre would ever come out alive again. [...].

== Literature ==
- Michael Rudloff: Trabalski Stanislaw (1896–1985): a biography between the political systems, in: "There are such pests is also available in Leipzig," London [ua], 1997, ISBN 3-631-47385-0. pp. 13–68.
- Beatrix Wrede-Bouvier: Off! Socialists in the Soviet Occupation Zone and the GDR 1945-1953, Bonn 1996, ISBN 3-8012-4075-4.
- Beatrix Wrede-Bouvier, Horst-Peter Schulz: "...but, the SPD has ceased to exist", 1991; ISBN 3-8012-0162-7, S. 203-226.
- Andreas Malycha: On the way to the SED, 1996; ISBN 3-8012-4065-7
- Mike Schmeitzner, Michael Rudloff: History of social democracy in the Saxon parliament, in contributions to the history of the labor movement, trafo verlag Dr. Wolfgang Weist, Berlin 40. Jahrgang 1998; ISSN 0942-3060
