= Lipna =

Lipna or Lipná may refer to the following places:

- Lipna, Lesser Poland Voivodeship (south Poland)
- Lipna, Łódź Voivodeship (central Poland)
- Lipna, Lubusz Voivodeship (west Poland)
- Lipná (Hazlov), village in Karlovy Vary Region, Czech Republic
