= Hilary Jastak =

Polish Catholic priest

Hilary Jastak (3 March 1914 – 17 January 2000) was a Polish Catholic priest prelate, Doctor of Theology, Chaplain of Solidarity movement, Major of Polish Armed Forces, Lieutenant Commander of Polish Navy.

Jastak was born in Kościerzyna. In 1934, he entered the Seminary in Pelplin. On 7 June 1941 in Warsaw, he was ordained as a priest by the Archbishop of Warsaw, Stanisław Gall. During the World War II, Jastak was vicar in Lubania, Józefów, Goszczyno (where he joined the Armia Krajowa), Sulejów, Strachówko, Gołubie and Pogódki.

In 1946, Jastak became the Chaplain of Caritas in Gdynia. In July 1949, Jastak became the provost of the newly created parish of the Sacred Heart of Jesus in Gdynia, with whom he was associated until his death. In 1966, Jastak completed the construction of the new church.

During Polish 1970 protests, Jastak actively supported families of people killed in street battles. Ten years later, during the Strike on the Coast (August 1980), at the request of the shipyard he celebrated Mass at the Gdynia shipyard. During the Martial law in Poland, Jastak actively supported the resistance movement and helped the imprisoned.

In 1991, Jastak created the Aid Scholarship Foundation, whose purpose is to promote talented young people from poor families.

Jastak is Honorary Citizen of Gdynia (1991) and Kościerzyna (1999). He was also awarded the Commander's Cross with Star of the Order of Polonia Restituta.

He died in 2000 in Gdynia, and was buried at the Church of the Sacred Heart of Jesus, in which he was provost for many years.
