= Władysław Kowalski (politician) =

Polish politician

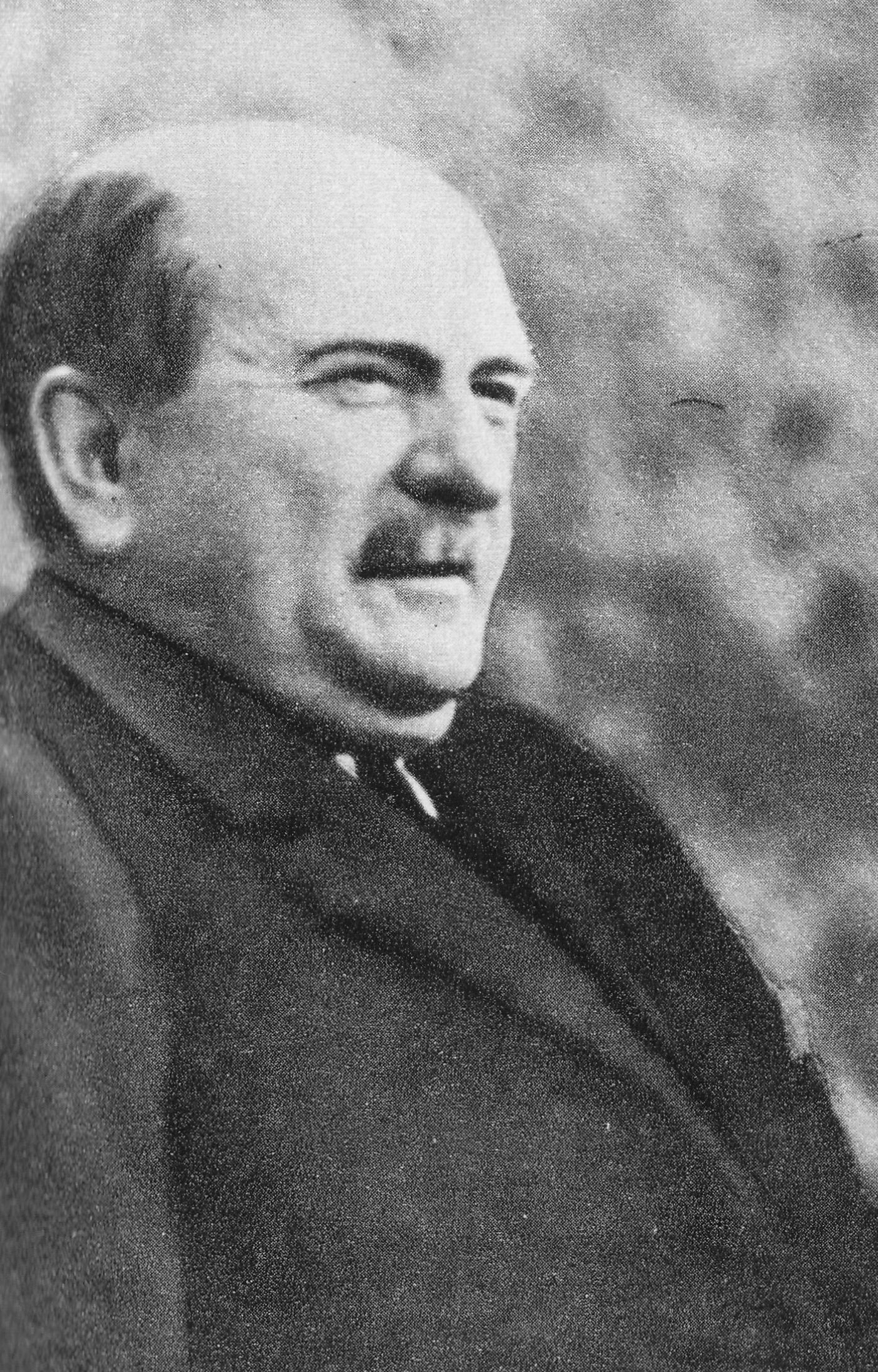

Marshal of the Sejm
- In office 4 February 1947 – 19 November 1952
- President: Bolesław Bierut
- Preceded by: Wacław Makowski (As Sejm Marshal of the Second Polish Republic)
- Succeeded by: Jan Dembowski

Acting President of Poland
- In office 4 February 1947 – 5 February 1947 Serving with Władysław Raczkiewicz (in exile)
- Prime Minister: Edward Osóbka-Morawski
- Preceded by: Franciszek Trąbalski (Acting)
- Succeeded by: Bolesław Bierut

Personal details
- Born: 26 August 1894 Paprotnia, then Russian Empire, now Poland
- Died: 14 December 1958 (aged 64) Warsaw, People's Republic of Poland
- Party: PSL, People's Party, Communist Party of Poland, United People's Party, PPR
- Spouse: Halina Kowalska
- Profession: Writer, Journalist, statesman

Władysław Kowalski (26 August 1894 – 14 December 1958) was a Polish communist politician who served as the Minister of Art and Culture and the Sejm Marshal during the first postwar parliament Sejm of the Polish People's Republic (1947–1952) and, in his capacity as Sejm Marshal, ex officio, as the acting head of state (Acting President of the State National Council) for one day (4–5 February 1947). He was also a publisher and writer.

Kowalski was also known by the pseudonyms Sałas, Bartłomiej Zarychta and Stanisławski.

== Life ==
Władysław Kowalski was born in a small village of Paprotnia near Rawa Mazowiecka (then Russian Empire, now east-central Poland) as a son of farm worker. Because of his family poverty, he graduated just three school grades and later became an autodidact. During World War I he fought in the Imperial Russian Army and later in the Puławy Legion. From 1918 to 1939 in the Second Polish Republic he was an active writer and publisher.

He was member of various peasants parties before he became a communist, including the Polish People's Party "Wyzwolenie" (since 1918), the Peasant's Independent Party (1925–1927), United People's Left "Samopomoc" (1927–1931), and People's Party (1944–1949 – various factions). He was also an active member of the Communist Party of Poland (since 1928) and Polish Workers' Party (since 1942).

Kowalski was a longtime member of party leaderships:

- 1926–1927: Member of the Central Committee of the PIP
- 1944–1945: Vice President of the SL "Wola"
- 1945–1949: Member of the Supreme Council of the SL
- 1948–1949: SL Leader
- Since 1949: Member of the United People's Party leadership and, from 1949 to 1956 Chairman of the Committee

During World War II he was a member of the Polish underground resistance. He hid 6 Jews around Warsaw, for which he was recognized as Righteous Among the Nations in 1995.

After the War, he was a Minister of Culture (1945–1947) and member and Vice President of the State National Council.

== Works ==
Kowalski was an author of novels, articles and poems.

=== Novels ===
- The Peasants of Marchat (1930)
- In Grzmiąca (1936)
- The Mianowski family (1938)

=== Stories ===
- Far and Close (1948)
- Rebellion in Stary Łęk (1951)
- The Beast (1951)
- Wine (1966)

Political offices
Preceded by Franciszek Trąbalski	Acting President of Poland; 1947	Succeeded by Bolesław Bierut
