= Władysławów, Rawa County =

Władysławów
- Village
- Location within Poland
- Coordinates: 51°40′43″N 20°34′28″E
- Country: Poland
- Voivodeship: Łódź
- County: Rawa
- Gmina: Sadkowice

Władysławów [vwadɨˈswavuf] is a village in the administrative district of Gmina Sadkowice, within Rawa County, Łódź Voivodeship, in central Poland.
