= Nowe Lutobory =

- Village
- Location within Poland
- Coordinates: 51°43′23″N 20°28′23″E
- Country: Poland
- Voivodeship: Łódź
- County: Rawa
- Gmina: Sadkowice
- Population: 75

Nowe Lutobory [ˈnɔvɛ lutɔˈbɔrɨ] is a village in the administrative district of Gmina Sadkowice, within Rawa County, Łódź Voivodeship, in central Poland.

In the years 1975–1998, the town administratively belonged to the Skierniewice Voivodeship. In 2022, the village had a population of 75.
