= Nowe Szwejki =

- Village
- Location within Poland
- Coordinates: 51°45′13″N 20°30′51″E
- Country: Poland
- Voivodeship: Łódź
- County: Rawa
- Gmina: Sadkowice

Nowe Szwejki [ˈnɔvɛ ˈʂfɛi̯ki] is a village in the administrative district of Gmina Sadkowice, within Rawa County, Łódź Voivodeship, in central Poland.
