= Seweryn Kiełpin =

Polish footballer

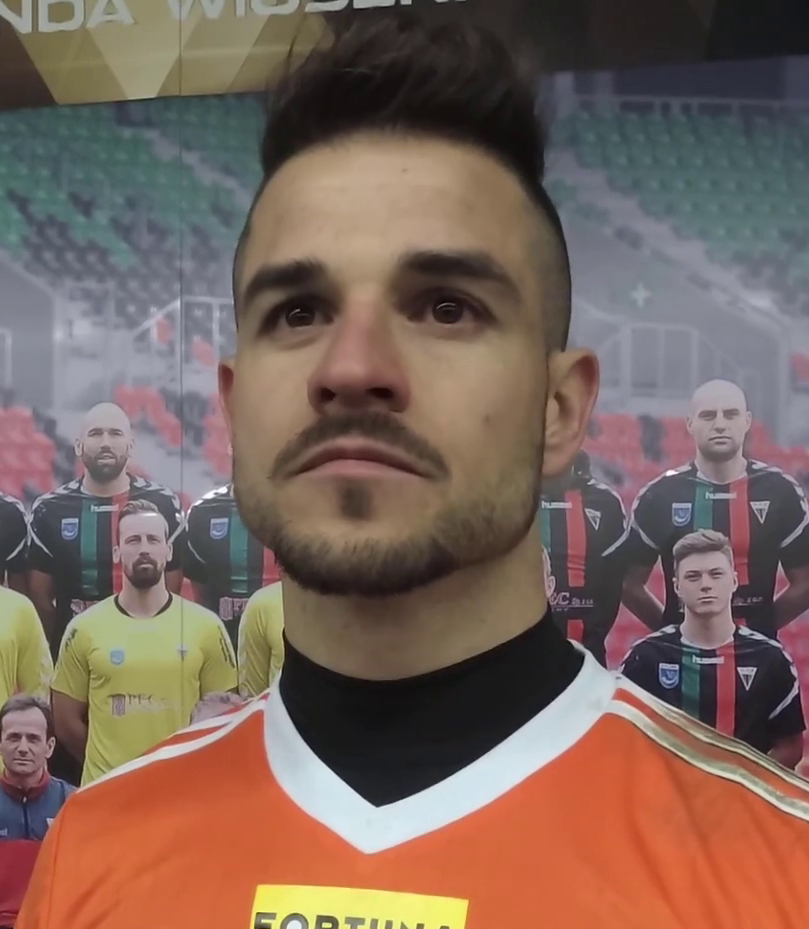

Personal information
- Full name: Seweryn Kiełpin
- Date of birth: 18 December 1987 (age 38)
- Place of birth: Kościerzyna, Poland
- Height: 1.84 m (6 ft 0 in)
- Position: Goalkeeper

Youth career
- 2003–2006: Górnik Zabrze

Senior career*
Years	Team	Apps	(Gls)
2006–2007	Koszarawa Żywiec	15	(0)
2008–2012	Polonia Bytom	12	(0)
2009–2010	→ Ruch Radzionków (loan)	45	(0)
2012	Ruch Radzionków	13	(0)
2012–2018	Wisła Płock	156	(0)
2018–2020	Stal Mielec	47	(0)
2020–2022	Motor Lublin	10	(0)
Total		298	(0)
- * Club domestic league appearances and goals

Seweryn Kiełpin (born 18 December 1987) is a Polish former professional footballer who played as a goalkeeper.

== Career ==
=== Club ===
As a youth player, Kiełpin joined the academy of Górnik Zabrze.

In the summer of 2010, he was loaned to Ruch Radzionków from Polonia Bytom. In December 2010, he returned to Polonia and then joined Ruch Radzionków again in January 2012, signing a deal on a free transfer.

== Personal life ==
After leaving Motor Lublin in 2022, he set up a profile on the social network TikTok, where he reached one million followers. Polsat Sport described him as a social media star.

== Honours ==
Wisła Płock

- II liga East: 2012–13

Stal Mielec

- I liga: 2019–20
