= Nowe Sadkowice =

- Village
- Location within Poland
- Coordinates: 51°44′50″N 20°31′46″E
- Country: Poland
- Voivodeship: Łódź
- County: Rawa
- Gmina: Sadkowice

Nowe Sadkowice [ˈnɔvɛ satkɔˈvit͡sɛ] is a village in the administrative district of Gmina Sadkowice, within Rawa County, Łódź Voivodeship, in central Poland.
