= Zabłocie, Rawa County =

Zabłocie
- Village
- Location within Poland
- Coordinates: 51°41′44″N 20°28′31″E
- Country: Poland
- Voivodeship: Łódź
- County: Rawa
- Gmina: Sadkowice

Zabłocie [zaˈbwɔt͡ɕɛ] is a village in the administrative district of Gmina Sadkowice, within Rawa County, Łódź Voivodeship, in central Poland.
