= Bujały =

- Village
- Location within Poland
- Coordinates: 51°42′N 20°32′E
- Country: Poland
- Voivodeship: Łódź
- County: Rawa
- Gmina: Sadkowice

Bujały [buˈjawɨ] is a village in the administrative district of Gmina Sadkowice, within Rawa County, Łódź Voivodeship, in central Poland.
