= Rzymiec, Rawa County =

Rzymiec
- Village
- Location within Poland
- Coordinates: 51°44′41″N 20°29′1″E
- Country: Poland
- Voivodeship: Łódź
- County: Rawa
- Gmina: Sadkowice

Rzymiec [ˈʐɨmjɛt͡s] is a village in the administrative district of Gmina Sadkowice, within Rawa County, Łódź Voivodeship, in central Poland.
