= Ferdinand Siegert =

German pediatrician

Ferdinand Siegert (22 April 1865, in Neuwied am Rhein – 21 February 1946, in Köln) was a German pediatrician. His name is associated with "Siegert's sign", defined as shortness and inward curvature of the terminal phalanges of the little fingers in Down syndrome.

In 1889 he received his medical doctorate form the University of Strassburg, subsequently serving as a secondary physician in Mödling near Vienna. Afterwards, he worked as an assistant under Friedrich Wilhelm Zahn at the institute of pathology in Geneva, and as an assistant to Oswald Kohts at the university children's clinic in Strassburg. While at Strassburg, he founded a Säuglingsfürsorge (an infant care institution) and a Säuglingsheilstatt (nursing home for infants).

In 1904, he was appointed an associate professor of pediatrics at the University of Halle, soon afterwards relocating to Munich as chair of pediatrics at the academy of practical medicine. In 1919 he moved to the University of Cologne as a professor of pediatrics.

Siegert is remembered for his work with infectious diseases, especially diphtheria. He was particularly interested in the inheritability of rickets as well as the nutritional needs of children (protein requirements).

== Publications ==
- Vier Jahre vor und nach der Einführung der Serumbehandlung der Diphterie. Berlin, 1900. - Four years before and after the introduction of serum treatment for diphtheria.
- Die Chorea minor, der Veitstanz : (Sydenham'sche Chorea, Chorea infectiosa), 1908 (part of the series: Würzburger Abhandlungen aus dem Gesamtgebiet der praktischen Medizin - Chorea, St. Vitus Dance (Sydenham's chorea, infectious chorea).
- Erkrankungen der Schilddrüse. Handbuch der Kinderheilkunde, 2nd edition, volume 3, Leipzig, 1910. - Thyroid disease.
- Die Athyrecose im Kindesalter. Handbuch der inneren Sekretionen, volume 3, 1; Leipzig, 1928 - Athyreosis in childhood.
- Atlas der normalen Ossifikation der menschlichen Hand, 1935 (part of the series: Fortschritte auf dem Gebiete der Röntgenstrahlen) - Atlas on the normal ossification of the human hand.
