= Rudka, Rawa County =

Rudka
- Village
- Location within Poland
- Coordinates: 51°40′17″N 20°37′57″E
- Country: Poland
- Voivodeship: Łódź
- County: Rawa
- Gmina: Sadkowice
- Population: 40

Rudka [ˈrutka] is a village in the administrative district of Gmina Sadkowice, within Rawa County, Łódź Voivodeship, in central Poland.
