= Studzianki, Rawa County =

Studzianki
- Village
- Location within Poland
- Coordinates: 51°43′7″N 20°27′16″E
- Country: Poland
- Voivodeship: Łódź
- County: Rawa
- Gmina: Sadkowice

Studzianki [stuˈd͡ʑaŋki] is a village in the administrative district of Gmina Sadkowice, within Rawa County, Łódź Voivodeship, in central Poland.
