= Eduard Arning =

English-German dermatologist and microbiologist

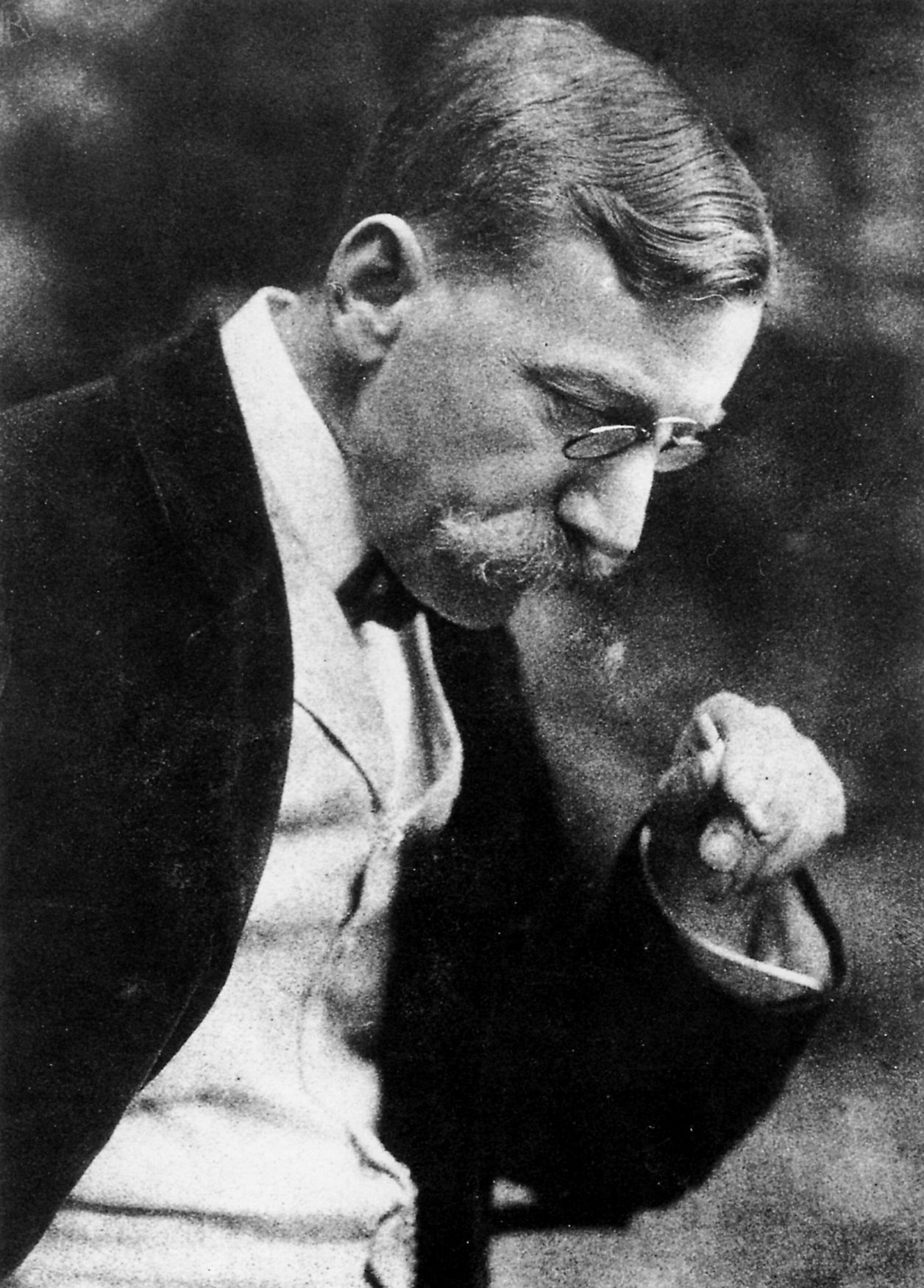
Eduard Arning; by Rudolf Dührkoop (1903)

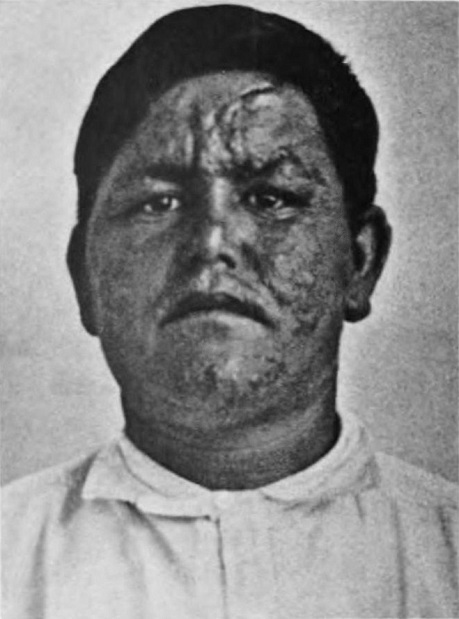
Keanu, a subject of Arning's leprosy experiments.

Eduard Christian Arning (9 June 1855 – 20 August 1936) was an English-German dermatologist and microbiologist from Manchester.

== Biography ==
Arning received his early education from private tutors and at the Gelehrtenschule des Johanneums in Hamburg. In 1879 he obtained his medical doctorate from Strassburg, and afterwards was a medical assistant in Strassburg under Adolf Kussmaul (1822–1902) and Oswald Kohts (1844–1912), and later in Berlin under Oskar Lassar (1849–1907). From 1884 to 1886, he researched leprosy in the Hawaiian Islands. In 1887 he became a specialist of dermatology and venereal disease in Hamburg, where from 1906 he served as physician-in-chief in the department of skin and venereal diseases at the "Allgemeines Krankenhaus St. Georg". In 1919 he became an associate professor of dermatology at the University of Hamburg.

Arning is known today for his medical studies done at the leper colony on Molokai. In 1884 he arrived in Hawaii under the sponsorship of King Kalakaua. He is remembered for his experiments involving contagiousness of leprosy. In Hawaii, he purposely infected a convicted murderer named Keanu with leprosy, by suturing a leproma the size of a hen's egg into an incision in the man's arm.

Today at the Hawaiian Historical Society Library in Honolulu are reproductions of 237 rare glass-plate photographs that Arning created during his stay in Hawaii. The originals were discovered in 1994 at the Museum für Völkerkunde Hamburg.

He was made a companion of the Royal Order of Kapiolani in 1886.

His name is associated with an anti-fungal solution known as Arningsche tinktur (Arning's tincture).

== Publications ==
- Weiterer Beitrag zur Klinik und Anatomie der Neuritis leprosa. 1893. (with Max Nonne 1861–1959).
- Etnographische Notizen Hawaii. Hamburg, 1931.
- "1995 Eduard Arning's Hawaiian Collections". The Hawaiian Journal of History, Vol No. pp. 177–181. Smithsonian Institution, Department of Anthropology.
