= Trębaczew, Rawa County =

Trębaczew
- Village
- Location within Poland
- Coordinates: 51°42′15″N 20°35′13″E
- Country: Poland
- Voivodeship: Łódź
- County: Rawa
- Gmina: Sadkowice
- Population: 650

Trębaczew [trɛmˈbat͡ʂɛf] is a village in the administrative district of Gmina Sadkowice, within Rawa County, Łódź Voivodeship, in central Poland.
