= Rokitnica-Kąty =

- Village
- Location within Poland
- Coordinates: 51°40′55″N 20°31′8″E
- Country: Poland
- Voivodeship: Łódź
- County: Rawa
- Gmina: Sadkowice

Rokitnica-Kąty [rɔkitˈnit͡sa ˈkɔntɨ] is a village in the administrative district of Gmina Sadkowice, within Rawa County, Łódź Voivodeship, in central Poland.
