= Jajkowice =

- Village
- Location within Poland
- Coordinates: 51°42′52″N 20°37′11″E
- Country: Poland
- Voivodeship: Łódź
- County: Rawa
- Gmina: Sadkowice

Jajkowice [jai̯kɔˈvit͡sɛ] is a village in the administrative district of Gmina Sadkowice, within Rawa County, Łódź Voivodeship, in central Poland.
