= Kłopoczyn =

- Village
- Location within Poland
- Coordinates: 51°41′52″N 20°37′22″E
- Country: Poland
- Voivodeship: Łódź
- County: Rawa
- Gmina: Sadkowice
- Website: http://www.klopoczynportal.yoyo.pl

Kłopoczyn [kwɔˈpɔt͡ʂɨn] is a village in the administrative district of Gmina Sadkowice, within Rawa County, Łódź Voivodeship, in central Poland.
