= Sadkowice, Łódź Voivodeship =

Sadkowice
- Village
- Location within Poland
- Coordinates: 51°43′27″N 20°30′49″E
- Country: Poland
- Voivodeship: Łódź
- County: Rawa
- Gmina: Sadkowice
- Population: 570
- Website: http://www.gminasadkowice.pl

Sadkowice [satkɔˈvit͡sɛ] is a village in Rawa County, Łódź Voivodeship, in central Poland. It is the seat of the gmina (administrative district) called Gmina Sadkowice.
