= Oswald Kohts =

German physician and pediatrician

Wilhelm Ernst Oswald Kohts (31 January 1844 in Berent, Province of Prussia – 1912) was a German physician and pediatrician.

He studied medicine at the Universities of Jena, Königsberg and Berlin. From 1870 he served as an assistant to Ernst Viktor von Leyden at Königsberg, and in 1872 began work as a secondary physician at the polyclinic in Strassburg. Here, he became an associate professor and director of the children's clinic. In 1878 he was appointed director of the university polyclinic. Among his students and assistants at Strassburg were dermatologist Eduard Arning (1855-1936) and pediatrician Ferdinand Siegert (1865-1946).

In 1886, he became a member of the Deutsche Akademie der Naturforscher Leopoldina.

== Written works ==
Kohts was the author of several monographs that were included in Carl Gerhardt's Handbuch der Kinderkrankheiten. The following are some of his principal writings:

- Ueber Ikterus bei Phosphor-Vergiftung, 1869 - On icterus with phosphorus poisoning.
- Über Diphterie - About diphtheria.
- Über die Behandlung der Diphteritis mit Papayotin, 1882 - On the treatment of diphtheria with papayotin (an enzyme obtained from the unripe fruit of the papaya).
- Beitrag zur Osteomyelitis acutissima 1887 - Contributions involving osteomyelitis acutissima.
