= Nowy Kaleń =

- Village
- Location within Poland
- Coordinates: 51°41′50″N 20°32′55″E
- Country: Poland
- Voivodeship: (Łódź Voivodeship) Łódź
- County: Rawa
- Gmina: Sadkowice

Nowy Kaleń [ˈnɔvɨ ˈkalɛɲ] is a village in the administrative district of Gmina Sadkowice, within Rawa County, Łódź Voivodeship, in central Poland.
