= Lewin, Łódź Voivodeship =

Lewin
- Village
- Location within Poland
- Coordinates: 51°42′25″N 20°27′28″E
- Country: Poland
- Voivodeship: Łódź
- County: Rawa
- Gmina: Sadkowice
- Population: 170

Lewin [ˈlɛvin] is a village in the administrative district of Gmina Sadkowice, within Rawa County, Łódź Voivodeship, in central Poland.
