= Przylaski =

Przylaski may refer to the following places:

- Przylaski, Lubusz Voivodeship (west Poland)
- Przylaski, Masovian Voivodeship (central Poland)
- Przylaski, Pomeranian Voivodeship (north Poland)
- Przylaski, West Pomeranian Voivodeship (north-west Poland)

== See also ==
- Przyluski (disambiguation), including Przyluki
