= Kościerzyna =

Kościerzyna Kòscérzëna (Kashubian)
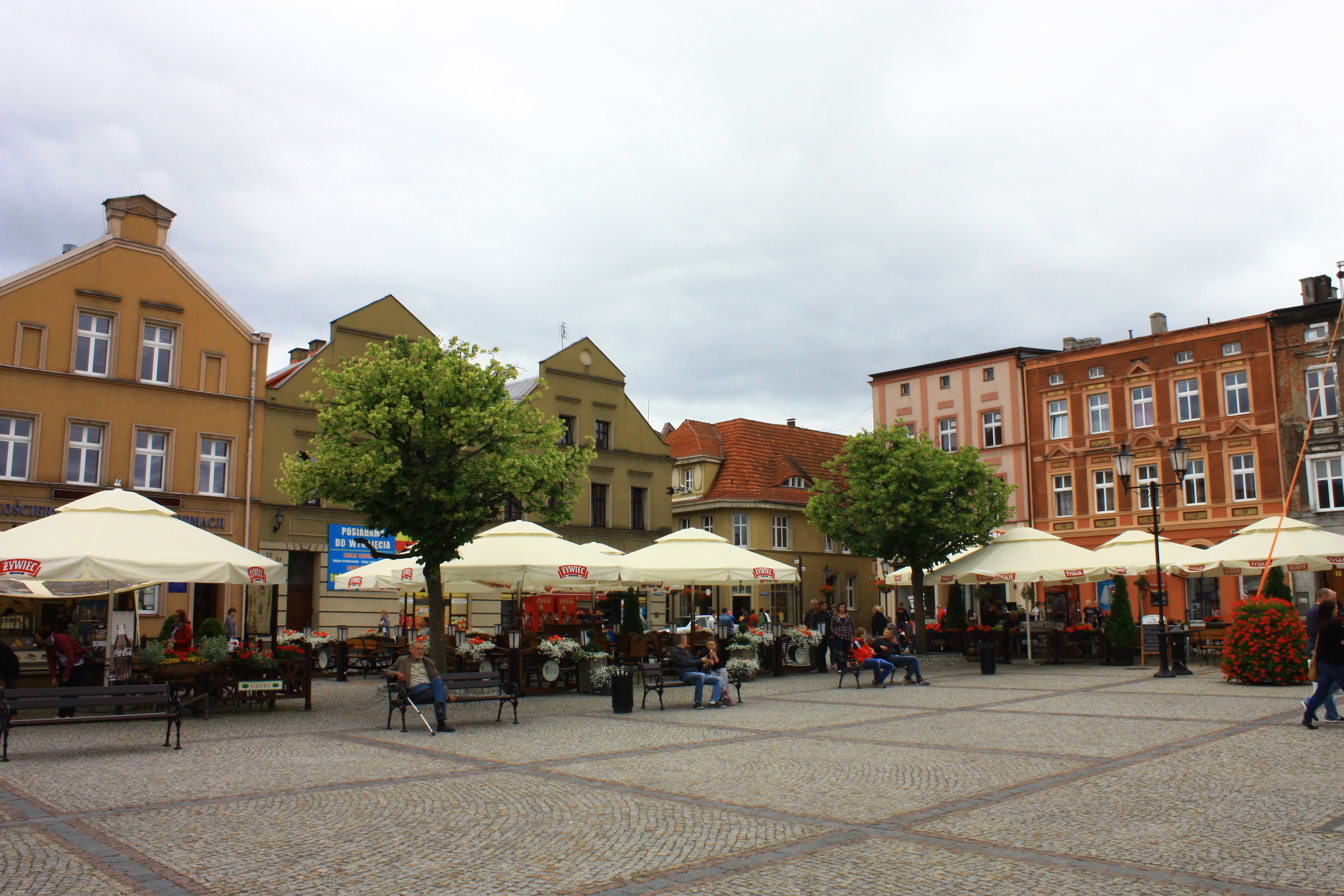
- Marketplace

- Flag Coat of arms

- Location within Poland
- Coordinates: 54°7′N 17°59′E
- Country: Poland
- Voivodeship: Pomeranian
- County: Kościerzyna
- Gmina: Kościerzyna (urban gmina)
- Established: 13th century
- Town rights: 1398

Government
  - Mayor: Dawid Jereczek

Area
  - Total: 15.83 km^{2} (6.11 sq mi)
- Elevation: 150 m (490 ft)

Population (2023)
  - Total: 23,327
  - Density: 1,474/km^{2} (3,817/sq mi)
- Time zone: UTC+1 (CET)
  - Summer (DST): UTC+2 (CEST)
- Postal code: 83-400 to 83-450
- Area code: +48 58
- Car plates: GKS
- Website: www.koscierzyna.gda.pl

Kościerzyna (Polish: [kɔɕt͡ɕɛˈʐɨna]; Kashubian: Kòscérzëna; former German: Berent [ˈbɛʁɛnt]) is a town in Kashubia in Gdańsk Pomerania region, northern Poland, with 23,327 inhabitants as of June 2023. It has been the capital of Kościerzyna County in Pomeranian Voivodeship since 1999; previously it was in Gdańsk Voivodeship from 1975 to 1998.

== Geographical location ==
Kościerzyna is in Gdańsk Pomerania, approximately 50 kilometres (31 miles) south-west of Gdańsk and Tricity and 190 km (118 mi) south-west of Kaliningrad, at a height of 163 m (535 ft) above sea level.

== History ==
The history of the town dates back to the end of the 13th century. The oldest known mention comes from a document from 1284. In 1346 it was granted municipal rights, and in 1398 the settlement obtained the status of a town. The town's name comes from the Old Polish word kościerz, which means "thicket". Kościerzyna was part of medieval Poland, until, in 1310, it was annexed by the Monastic State of the Teutonic Knights. After the Second Peace of Thorn (1466), the town became part of the Kingdom of Poland again. Administratively it was part of the Pomeranian Voivodeship, located in the provinces of Royal Prussia and Greater Poland. It was the seat of local Polish starosts. Kościerzyna was a small town, whose inhabitants made a living from trade, crafts and farming.

The town suffered many times from fire. In 1463 it was first plundered and thereafter burned down completely by Poles during the Thirteen Years' War. In 1626, during the Polish–Swedish War (1626–29), it was completely burned down once more. During the years 1646, 1663 and 1669 it partly burned down, and in 1709 again, entirely.

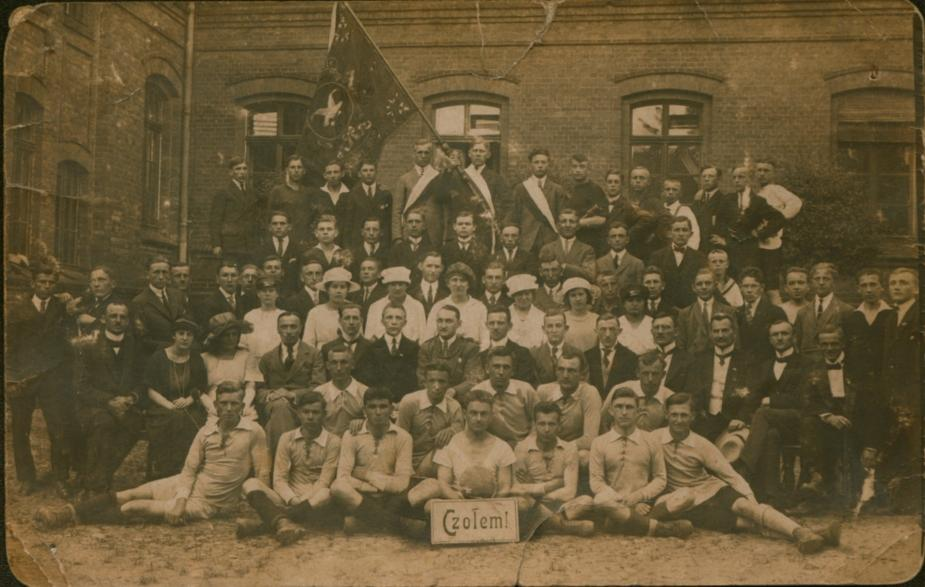
"Sokół" Polish Gymnastic Society in Kościerzyna

In the First Partition of Poland in 1772 the town was annexed by Kingdom of Prussia. It was administratively in the newly formed province of West Prussia, where it remained until 1919. The town was subjected to anti-Polish policies, including Germanisation. During the Kashubian diaspora, many families from Kościerzyna, such as the Mrozeks, the Pellowskis and the Eichmans emigrated to the area of Winona, Minnesota, in the United States, beginning in 1859. Despite Germanisation policies, the town was a center of Polish activity in the 19th century. In 1863, volunteers set out from the town to fight in the Polish January Uprising in the Russian Partition of Poland, but few managed to cross the Prussian-Russian border, while many were imprisoned by Prussians. Around 1900, the town had one Protestant church, one Catholic church, a synagogue, a high school, an academy for school teachers, a factory for the production of snuff, several breweries, a refinery, various mills, agriculture and forestry. In the late 19th and early 20th century Poles founded various organizations, including the "Sokół" Polish Gymnastic Society, reading rooms, Bank Ludowy ("People's Bank"), and the Kashubian newspaper Gryf began publishing. Writer and activist Aleksander Majkowski was active in the town.

After Poland regained independence after World War I in 1918, the Polish population made efforts to reintegrate the town with Poland. In January 1919, the Germans sent a unit of 120 soldiers to the town to prevent the outbreak of a Polish uprising. Local activist Tomasz Rogala, who co-founded a secret Polish independence organization, went to the peace conference in Versailles, where he demanded to include the town in reborn Poland. Kościerzyna was finally reintegrated with the Second Polish Republic in January 1920. The construction of the Polish Coal Trunk-Line in the interbellum contributed to the prosperity of Kościerzyna, as the town gained a modern railway connection with Gdynia, Bydgoszcz and Upper Silesia.

=== World War II ===
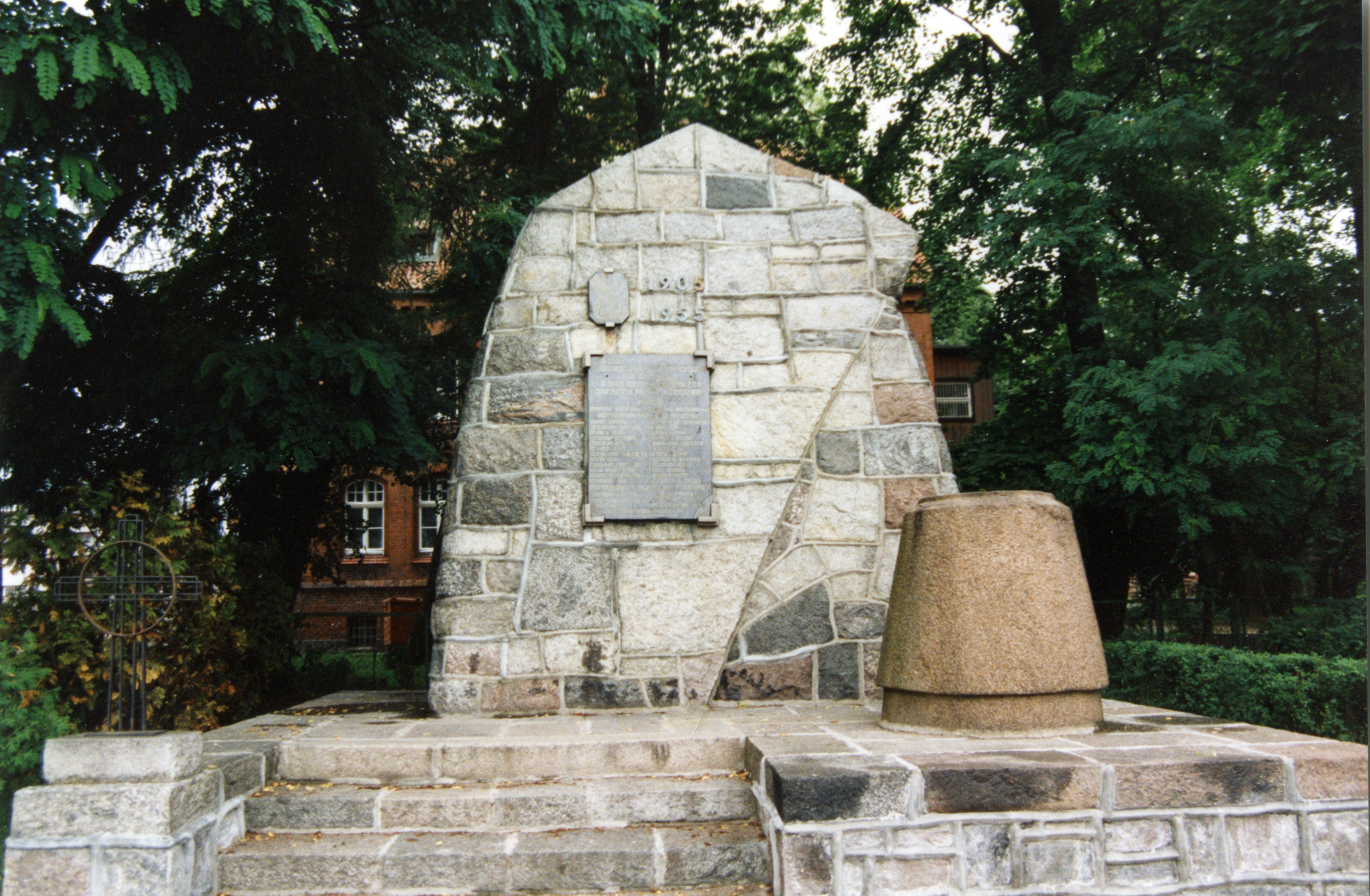
Monument to local Poles who died in the fights for freedom and independence during World War II

After the invasion of Poland, which started World War II, between 1939 and 1945, it was occupied by Nazi Germany. Poles were subjected to persecution, murders, deportations to Nazi concentration camps, and expulsions (see Nazi crimes against the Polish nation).

In the first weeks of the occupation, in September 1939, the Germans arrested and imprisoned numerous Poles from the town and the surrounding area. About 600 Poles were murdered in the nearby forest, and some were deported to concentration camps.

Between November 6 and 22, 1939, the Germans expelled 2,000 Poles, who were first deported to the temporary concentration camp in Wysin, and then to the General Government in the more-eastern part of German-occupied Poland. The expulsions continued until March 1944. Among the expellees was Tomasz Rogala, who returned to Kościerzyna after the war, and in the following decades was commemorated with a monument. Poles who refused to sign the Volksliste were arrested and tortured by the Gestapo, some were tortured to death, or murdered, while their families were deported to concentration camps.

Despite this, the Poles managed to organize an underground resistance movement, including the Pomeranian Griffin, the Union of Armed Struggle-Home Army, and Polska Armia Powstania secret military organizations. In 1944, the Gestapo arrested some 30 resistance members and crushed the Kościerzyna District Command of the Home Army. In January 1945, a German-perpetrated death march of Allied prisoners-of-war from the Stalag XX-B POW camp passed through the town. After World War II the town was restored to Poland.

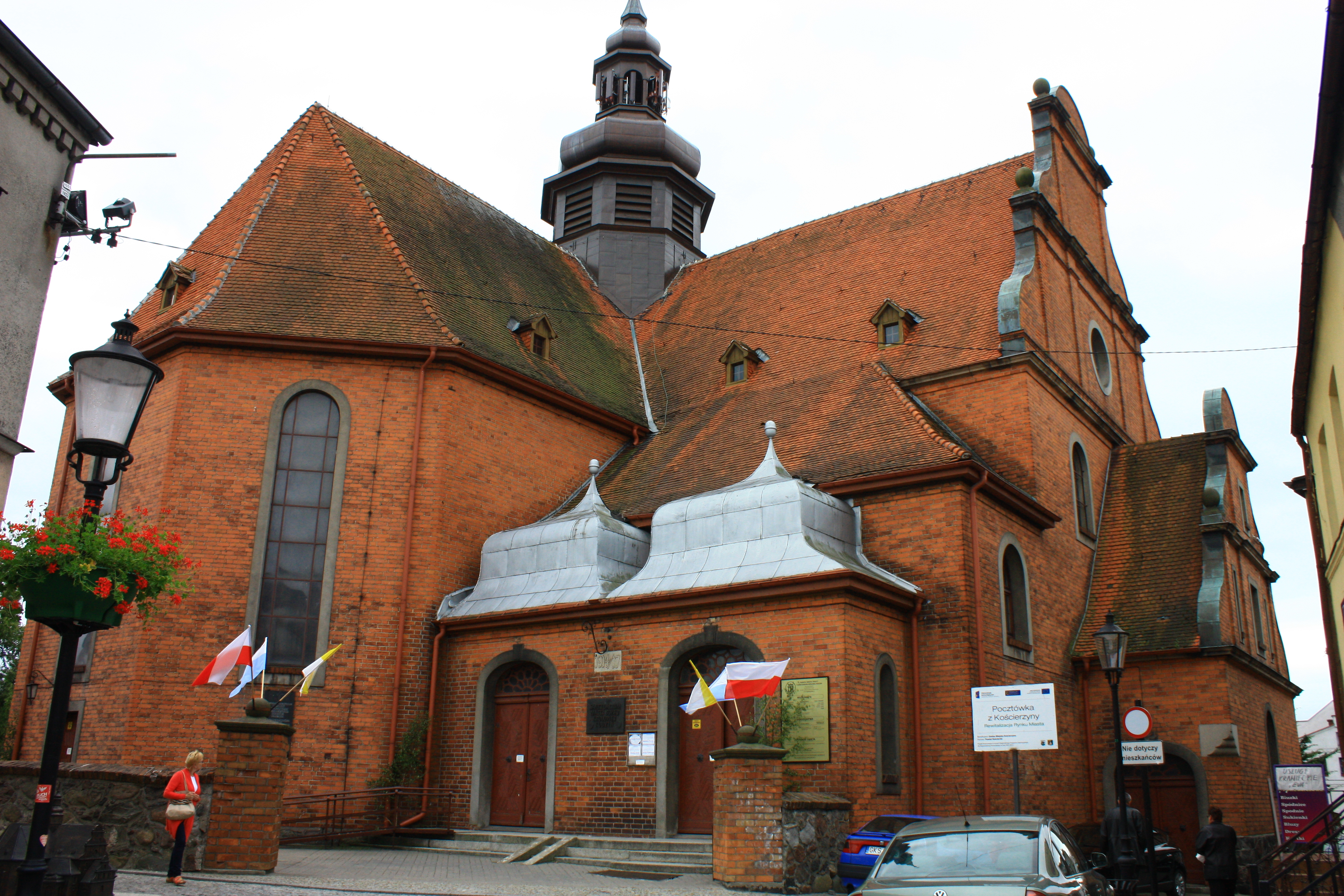
Holy Trinity church

=== Number of inhabitants by year ===
Historical population

Year	Pop.	±%
1772	602	—
1784	over 600	—
1831	1,592	—
1875	4,138	+159.9%
1880	4,238	+2.4%
1890	4,299	+1.4%
1900	4,910	+14.2%

Year	Pop.	±%
1920	6,500	+32.4%
1943	8,385	+29.0%
1960	10,900	+30.0%
1970	15,100	+38.5%
1980	18,664	+23.6%
1990	22,663	+21.4%
2003	23,196	+2.4%

== Tourist attractions ==
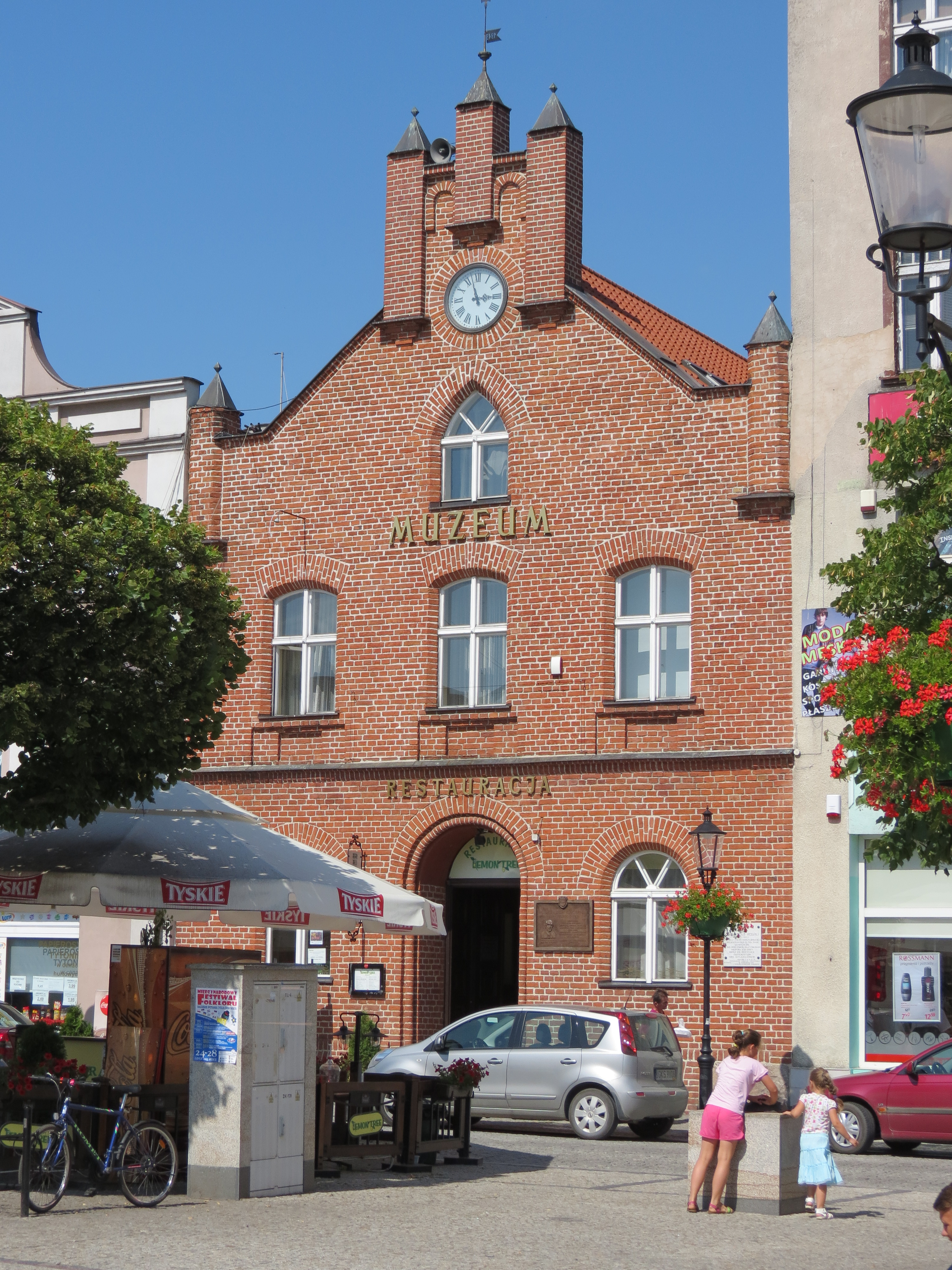
Regional museum at the Market Square

- Skansen Parowozownia Kościerzyna (railway museum) located at Towarowa 7 Street.
- Muzeum Ziemi Kościerskiej (regional museum)
- Rynek (Market Square) filled with colourful historic townhouses
- Lake Gałęźne
- Holy Trinity church, Sanctuary of Our Lady of Kościerzyna
- Church of the Lord's Resurrection

== Sports ==
- Kaszubia Kościerzyna - football club
- Manta Kościerzyna - finswimming club

== Notable residents ==
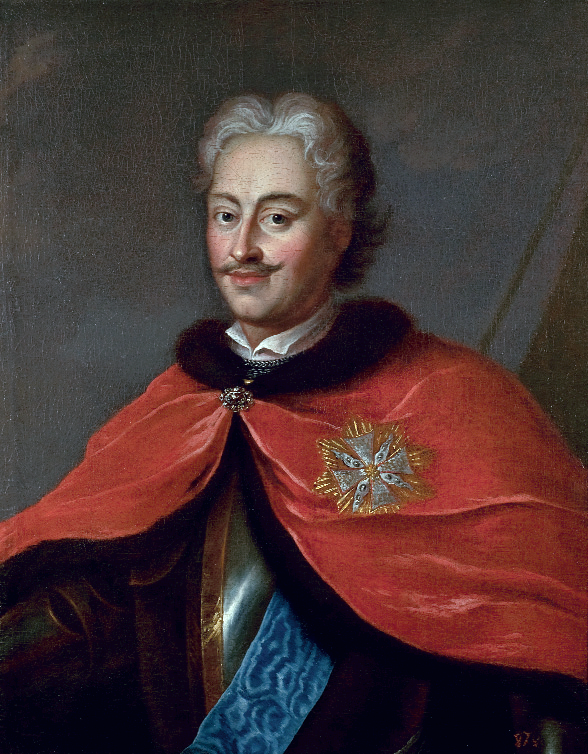
Stanisław Ernest Denhoff, c.1713

- Stanisław Ernest Denhoff (c.1673–1728), Polish aristocrat, politician and a military commander
- Hilary Jastak (1914–2000), leading priest
- Abraham Lissauer (1832–1908), German physician and archaeologist
- Oswald Kohts (1844–1912), German physician and pediatrician
- Gustav Flatow (1875–1945), German gymnast, competed at the 1896 and at the 1900 Summer Olympics
- Aleksander Majkowski (1876–1938), Kashubian writer, poet, journalist, editor, activist and physician
- Hugo Neumann (1882–1962), German jurist, politician of the Free City of Danzig and writer
- Marek Kulas (born 1963), Polish former racing cyclist, won the 1986 Tour de Pologne
- Marcin Rekowski (born 1978), Polish professional heavyweight boxer
- Rafał Kosznik (born 1983), Polish footballer, over 200 pro games
- Seweryn Kiełpin (born 1987), Polish footballer, over 200 pro games
- Daniel Pek (born 1991), Paralympic athlete from Poland, represented Poland at the 2012 Summer Paralympics
- Sławomir Stolc (born 1993), Polish volleyball player, a member of Poland men's national volleyball team
- Patryk Dobek (born 1994), Polish athlete

== Twin cities ==
Kościerzyna is twinned with:

Cölbe, Germany; Padul, Spain	Pryluky, Ukraine; Sanary-sur-Mer, France

== See also ==
- Kościerzyna (PKP station)

== Gallery ==
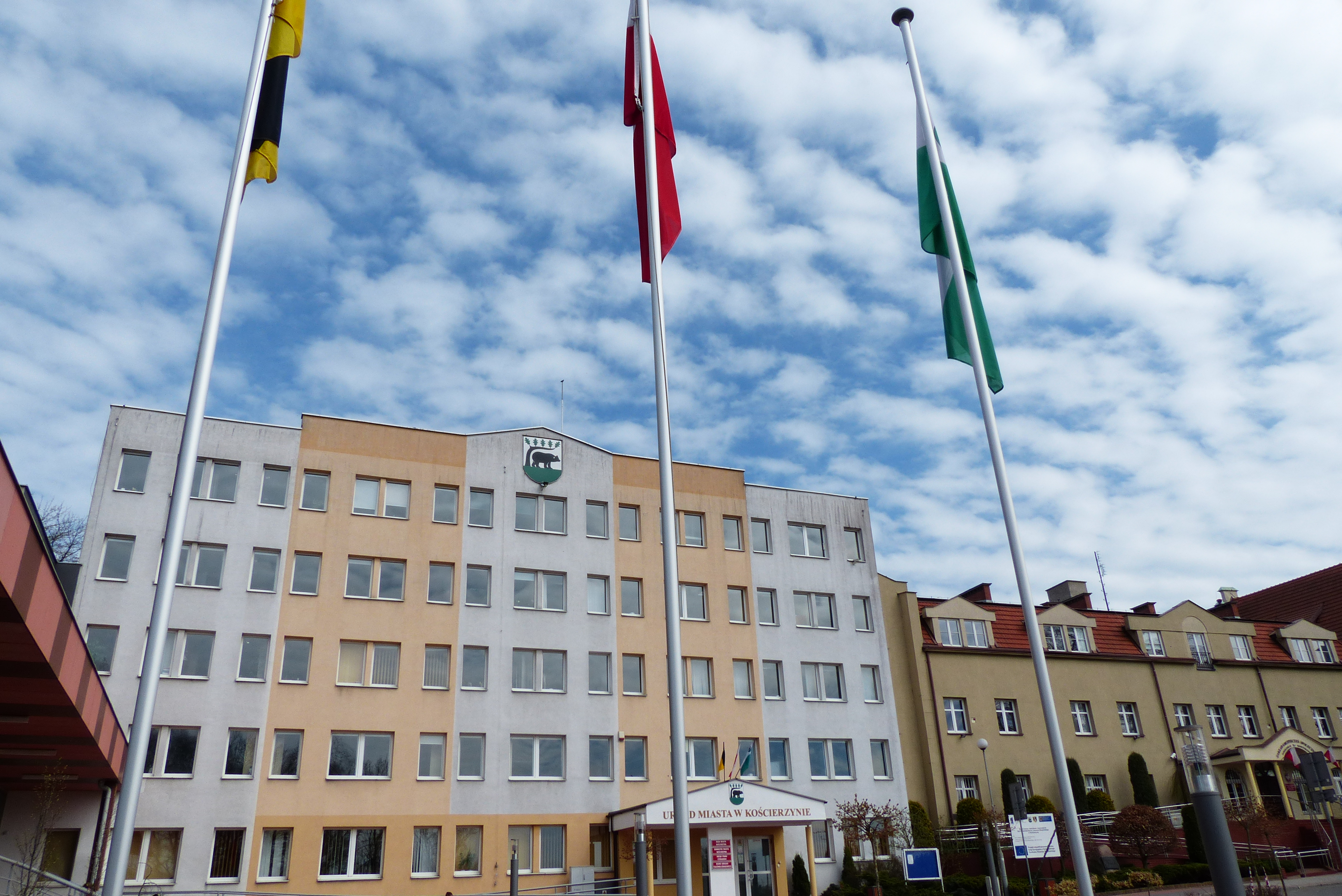
City Hall

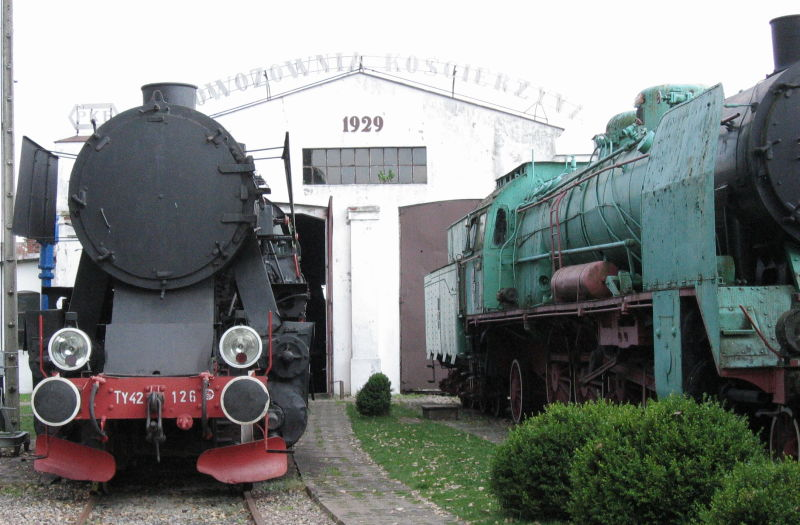
Railway Museum

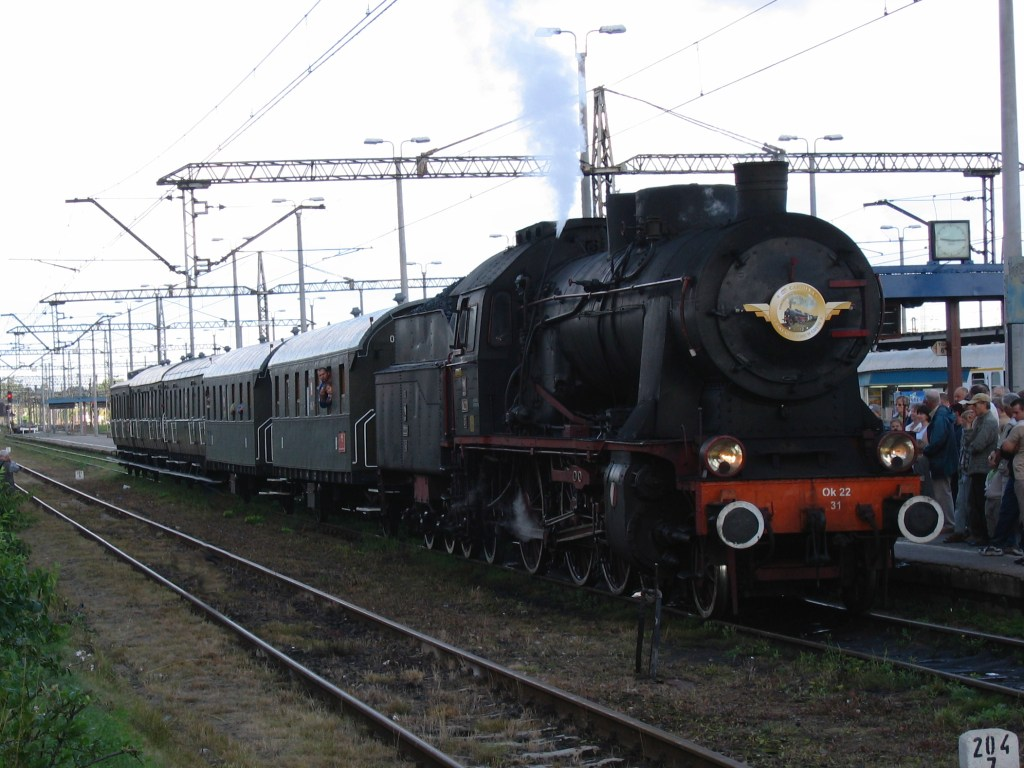
Retro train "Costerina" Gdynia - Kościerzyna

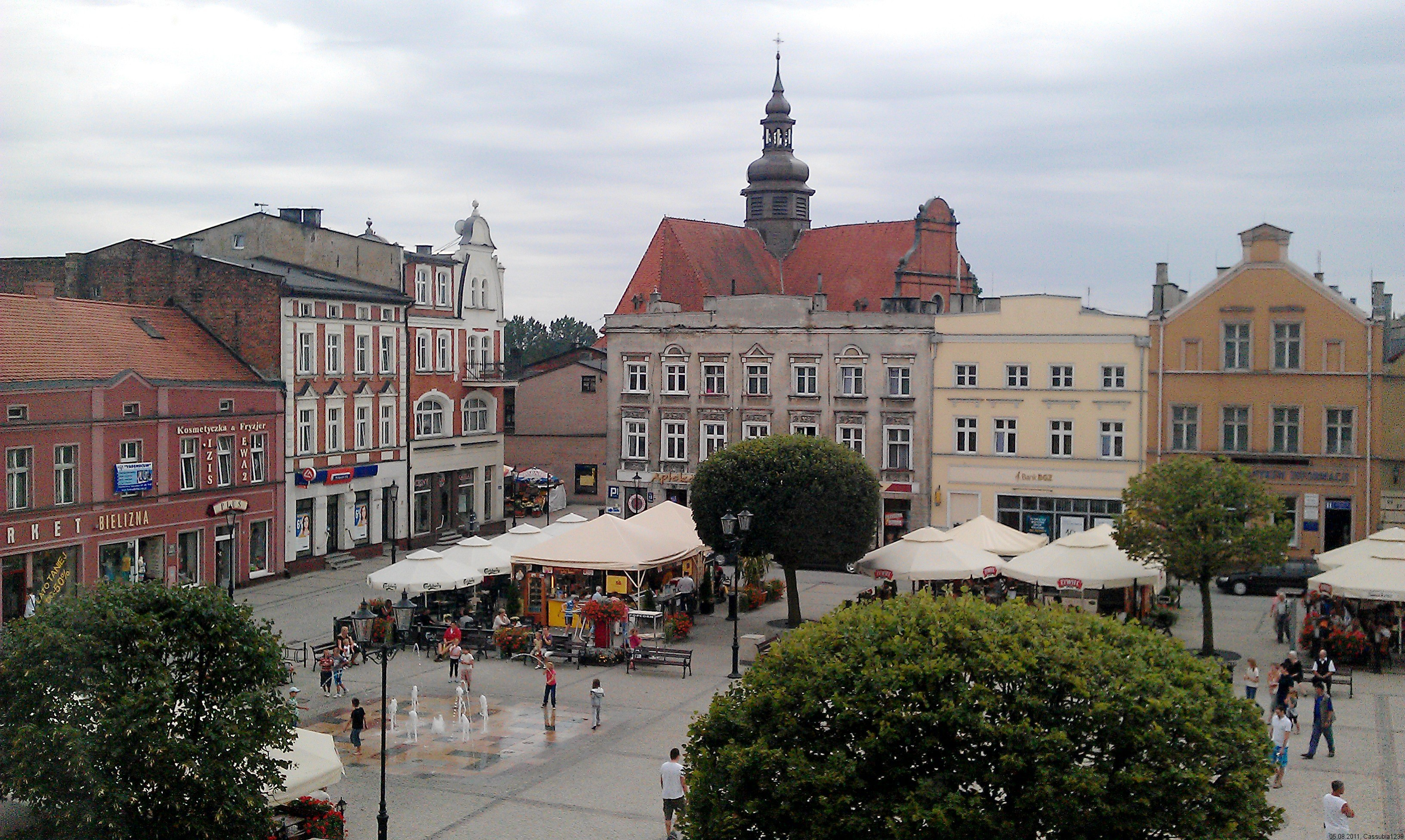
Marketplace

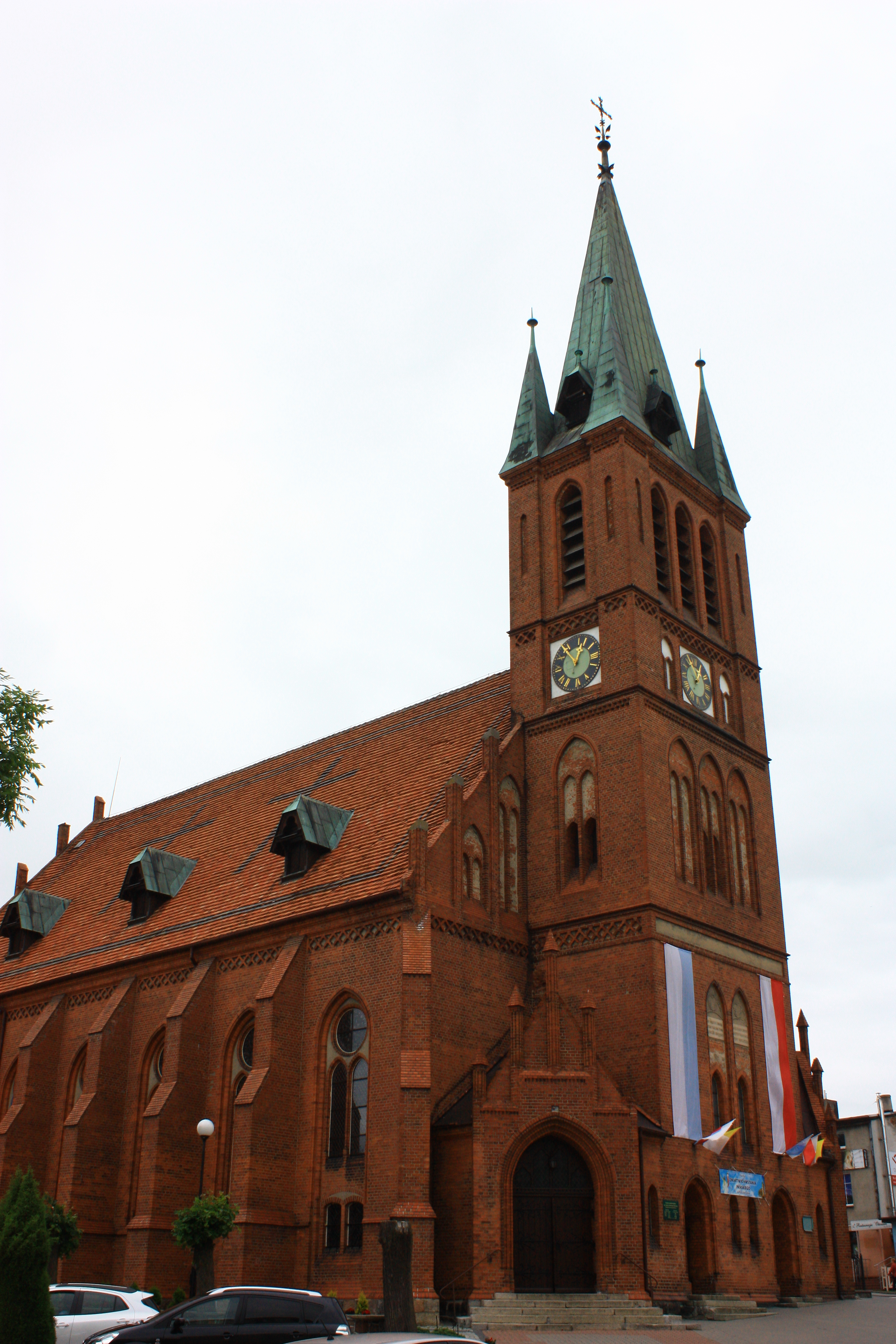
Church of the Lord's Resurrection
