= Gmina Sadkowice =

Gmina Sadkowice Sadkowice Commune
- Gmina
- Coat of arms
- Interactive map of Gmina Sadkowice
- Coordinates (Sadkowice): 51°43′27″N 20°30′49″E
- Country: Poland
- Voivodeship: Łódź
- County: Rawa
- Seat: Sadkowice

Area
  - Total: 121.08 km^{2} (46.75 sq mi)

Population (2006)
  - Total: 5,725
  - Density: 47.28/km^{2} (122.5/sq mi)
- Website: http://www.gminasadkowice.pl

Gmina Sadkowice is a rural gmina (administrative district) in Rawa County, Łódź Voivodeship, in central Poland. Its seat is the village of Sadkowice, which lies approximately 19 kilometres (12 mi) east of Rawa Mazowiecka and 73 km (45 mi) east of the regional capital Łódź.

The gmina covers an area of 121.08 square kilometres (46.7 sq mi), and as of 2006 its total population is 5,725.

== Villages ==
Gmina Sadkowice contains the villages and settlements of Broniew, Bujały, Celinów, Gacpary, Gogolin, Jajkowice, Kaleń, Kłopoczyn, Lewin, Lipna, Lubania, Lutobory, Nowe Lutobory, Nowe Sadkowice, Nowe Szwejki, Nowy Kaleń, Nowy Kłopoczyn, Olszowa Wola, Paprotnia, Pilawy, Przyłuski, Rokitnica-Kąty, Rudka, Rzymiec, Sadkowice, Skarbkowa, Studzianki, Szwejki Wielkie, Trębaczew, Turobowice, Władysławów, Zabłocie, Zaborze and Żelazna.

== Neighbouring gminas ==
Gmina Sadkowice is bordered by the gminas of Biała Rawska, Błędów, Cielądz, Mogielnica, Nowe Miasto nad Pilicą and Regnów.
