= Gacpary =

- Village
- Location within Poland
- Coordinates: 51°43′35″N 20°27′45″E
- Country: Poland
- Voivodeship: Łódź
- County: Rawa
- Gmina: Sadkowice

Gacpary (Polish pronunciation: [ɡat͡sˈparɨ]) is a village in the administrative district of Gmina Sadkowice, within Rawa County, Łódź Voivodeship, in central Poland.
