= Broniew =

- Village
- Location within Poland
- Coordinates: 51°44′8″N 20°37′43″E
- Country: Poland
- Voivodeship: Łódź
- County: Rawa
- Gmina: Sadkowice

Broniew [ˈbrɔɲɛf] is a village in the administrative district of Gmina Sadkowice, within Rawa County, Łódź Voivodeship, in central Poland.
