= Żelazna, Rawa County =

Żelazna
- Village
- Location within Poland
- Coordinates: 51°40′4″N 20°36′18″E
- Country: Poland
- Voivodeship: Łódź
- County: Rawa
- Gmina: Sadkowice

Żelazna [ʐɛˈlazna] is a village in the administrative district of Gmina Sadkowice, within Rawa County, Łódź Voivodeship, in central Poland.
