= Turobowice, Rawa County =

Turobowice
- Village
- Location within Poland
- Coordinates: 51°44′16″N 20°28′21″E
- Country: Poland
- Voivodeship: Łódź
- County: Rawa
- Gmina: Sadkowice

Turobowice [turɔbɔˈvit͡sɛ] is a village in the administrative district of Gmina Sadkowice, within Rawa County, Łódź Voivodeship, in central Poland.
