= Szwejki Wielkie =

- Village
- Location within Poland
- Coordinates: 51°45′N 20°29′E
- Country: Poland
- Voivodeship: Łódź
- County: Rawa
- Gmina: Sadkowice

Szwejki Wielkie [ˈʂfɛi̯ki ˈvjɛlkʲɛ] is a village in the administrative district of Gmina Sadkowice, within Rawa County, Łódź Voivodeship, in central Poland.
