= Celinów, Rawa County =

Celinów
- Village
- Location within Poland
- Coordinates: 51°44′27″N 20°33′9″E
- Country: Poland
- Voivodeship: Łódź
- County: Rawa
- Gmina: Sadkowice

Celinów [t͡sɛˈlinuf] is a village in the administrative district of Gmina Sadkowice, within Rawa County, Łódź Voivodeship, in central Poland.
