= Przyłuski, Gmina Sadkowice =

Przyłuski
- Village
- Location within Poland
- Coordinates: 51°42′7″N 20°29′16″E
- Country: Poland
- Voivodeship: Łódź
- County: Rawa
- Gmina: Sadkowice

Przyłuski [pʂɨˈwuski] is a village in the administrative district of Gmina Sadkowice, within Rawa County, Łódź Voivodeship, in central Poland.

== See also ==
- Przyłuski, Gmina Biała Rawska
