= Przyłuski, Gmina Biała Rawska =

Przyłuski
- Village
- Location within Poland
- Coordinates: 51°47′N 20°33′E
- Country: Poland
- Voivodeship: Łódź
- County: Rawa
- Gmina: Biała Rawska

Przyłuski [pʂɨˈwuskʲi] is a village in the administrative district of Gmina Biała Rawska, within Rawa County, Łódź Voivodeship, in central Poland.

== See also ==
- Przyłuski, Gmina Sadkowice
