= Richard Lipinski =

German politician

Member of the Reichstag
- In office 1920–1933

Personal details
- Born: February 6, 1867 Danzig, Kingdom of Prussia
- Died: April 18, 1936 (aged 69) Bennewitz, Nazi Germany
- Party: Social Democratic Party of Germany (1922– & 1890–1917); Independent Social Democratic Party of Germany (1917–1922)
- Spouse: Selma Maria Böttger
- Relations: Stanislaw Trabalski (son-in-law); Karl Trabalski (grandson)
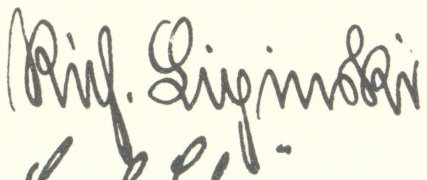
- Signature

Robert Richard Lipinski (6 February 1867 – 18 April 1936) was a German unionist, politician and writer, who was active in Germany's Social Democratic Party and the Independent Social Democratic Party.

== Early life and career ==
Lipinski was born in Danzig and was the third of four children of Heinrich Johann Lipinski (1837–75) and Christina Charlotte Henriette née Schroeder (1832–85). His parents separated during his childhood and as a child, he worked in a shipyard to contribute to the family. He did not receive an education after elementary school. Lipinski attended the primary school in Danzig from 1874 to 1881.

At the age of 14, Lipinski was offered a short-term contract as a gardener before becoming a shop assistant in a material goods store serving brandy by the end of 1881. He broke off the contract in early 1882 because of maltreatment from his boss. In April 1882, he moved to Leipzig with his mother, where he started a job in the distilling business. He later worked as a bookkeeper in his brother's mirror and frame factory.

From September 1882 to 1894, he was a rapporteur for the Socialist Leipziger Zeitung, and was fined and imprisoned several times for violating press law regulations.

In 1886, he joined the trade union and four years later the Social Democratic Party (SPD). In the following years, he was a co-founder of several smaller unions: the Free Association of Merchants in 1890, the Association of Commercial Employees in 1897, the Association of Workers Press in 1900, and the Association of Modern Labour Movement Staff in 1901. In 1900, he was the co-founder of the association of the workers' press. A year later he was one of the founders of the "Association of the support on the floor of the modern labor movement staff". From 1894 to 1901, he worked part-time as the editor of the newspaper Leipziger Volkszeitung.

Lipinski married Selma Maria nee Böttger (1875–1960) in Kleinmiltiz. They had eight children; his daughter Margaret married socialist politician Stanislaw Trabalski in 1921.

== Political career ==
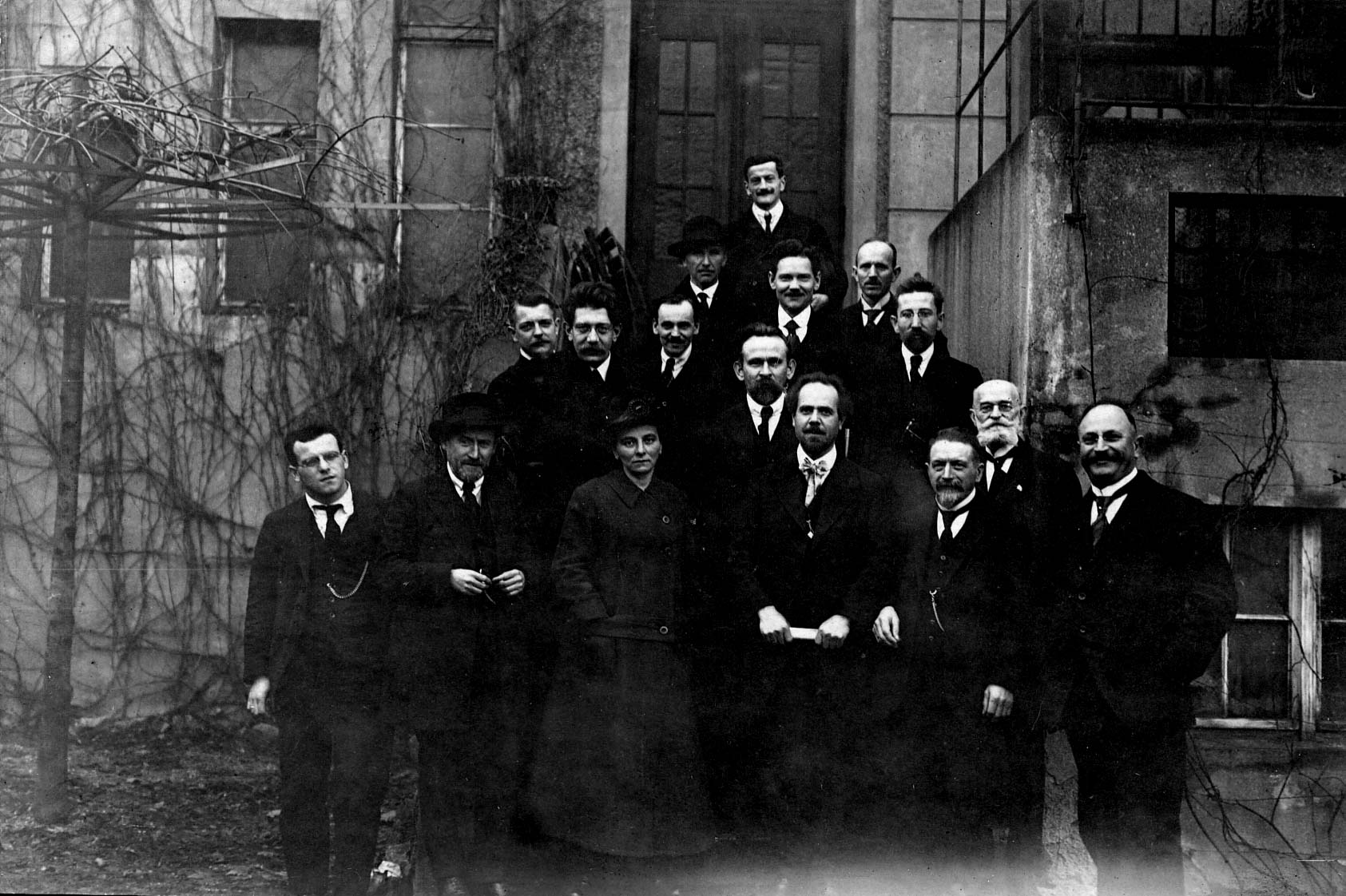
USPD Party Board on 5 December 1919, Arthur Crispien, Wilhelm Dittmann, Viktor Adler, Richard Lipinski, Wilhelm Bock, Alfred Henke Eduard Bernstein, Fritz Geyer, Fritz Zubeil, Hugo Haase, Fritz Kunert, Georg Ledebour, Arthur Hagen, Emanuel Wurm

From 1907 to 1917, Lipinski was the chairman of the SPD district of Leipzig. He won his first political office in 1897 during a protest election against Ernst Grenz when the latter was first elected to the Leipzig agitation committee. In 1898, Lipinski was a candidate in the constituency Oschatz Grimma, a stronghold of the conservatives, and lost the election. From 1903 to 1907, he was a member of the Reichstag. During the First World War, in 1917, he and the Leipzig SPD joined the USPD, which represented the war a bit differently compared to the majority of social democrats. In March 1918, Lipinski was brought into custody on suspicion of "attempted high treason". However, the revolution started before the process could begin. Lipinski was the chairman of this party in Leipzig until 1933.

Between 1917 and 1922 he was a member of the Central Committee party.

In April 1917, Lipinski, with support from Arthur Lieberasch, was involved in a strike against the reduction of food rations. They were cautious as trade union leaders as they were also putting forward political demands: an end to censorship and the introduction of democracy. They also wanted to ensure that no striker would be arrested or conscripted. They spoke directly with members of the local Kriegamstelle (War Ministry), who agreed to increase food deliveries to Leipzig. This news was relayed to a mass meeting of 10,000 strikers at Leipzig Stötteritz. Lipinski, Lieberasch, and Hermann Liebmann were elected to go and meet with Theobald von Bethmann Hollweg, Chancellor of Germany, the next day. However, when they went to Berlin, Bethmann Hollweg refused to meet them and they were dealt with by Wahneschaffe and Wilhelm Groener, head of the Kriegsamt, who showed sympathy but agreed to nothing. Meanwhile, the local union leaders stepped in to negotiate a series of concessions, including a reduction of the working week, and the imposition of overtime and Sunday work only for emergencies. The union leaders' readiness to accept the end of the strike without other concessions contributed to the working class' disillusion with them, and were regarded by many as social patriots.

Lipinski was the People's Representative and chairman of the Council of People's Deputies in Saxony from 15 November 1918 to 16 January 1919. One of his first goals was to introduce universal, equal, direct and secret proportional representation for men and women over the age of 21, which he proposed on 28 November 1918.

During the November Revolution, Lipinski slowed down the action of the Workers' and Soldiers' Council in Leipzig and represented the "treacherous" role of Ebert, Scheidemann, and Noske. During the Kapp Putsch, he betrayed the fighting workers in Leipzig by concluding a ceasefire agreement (similar to the "Bielefeld Agreement Severing") with the commander of the counter-revolutionary troops without their knowledge and consent, which ultimately led to the end of the fighting.

In December 1918, Lipinski was a delegate to the Reich Congress of Workers' and Soldiers' Councils. Between 1919 and 1920 he was a member of parliament in Saxony, where he was chairman of the Independent Socialists Group and Vice President of the Landtag. From 11 December 1920 to 2 February 1923 he was interior minister under Wilhelm Buck. In 1922, he rejoined the SPD and became a member of the Central Party Committee again from 1912 to 1916. Between 1920 and 1933, Lipinski was a member of the Reichstag, first for the USPD then for the SPD. On 22 March 1933, he voted in the Reichstag against Adolf Hitler's Enabling Act.

== Arrest and death ==
As a prominent Social Democrat and former Saxony interior minister, Lipinski was imprisoned during the Nazi regime from 1933 to 1935, before dying in 1936. Under the eyes of the Gestapo about a thousand people gathered to pay him their last respects. Lipinski's grave is located in the Leipzig's southern cemetery.

== Honours ==
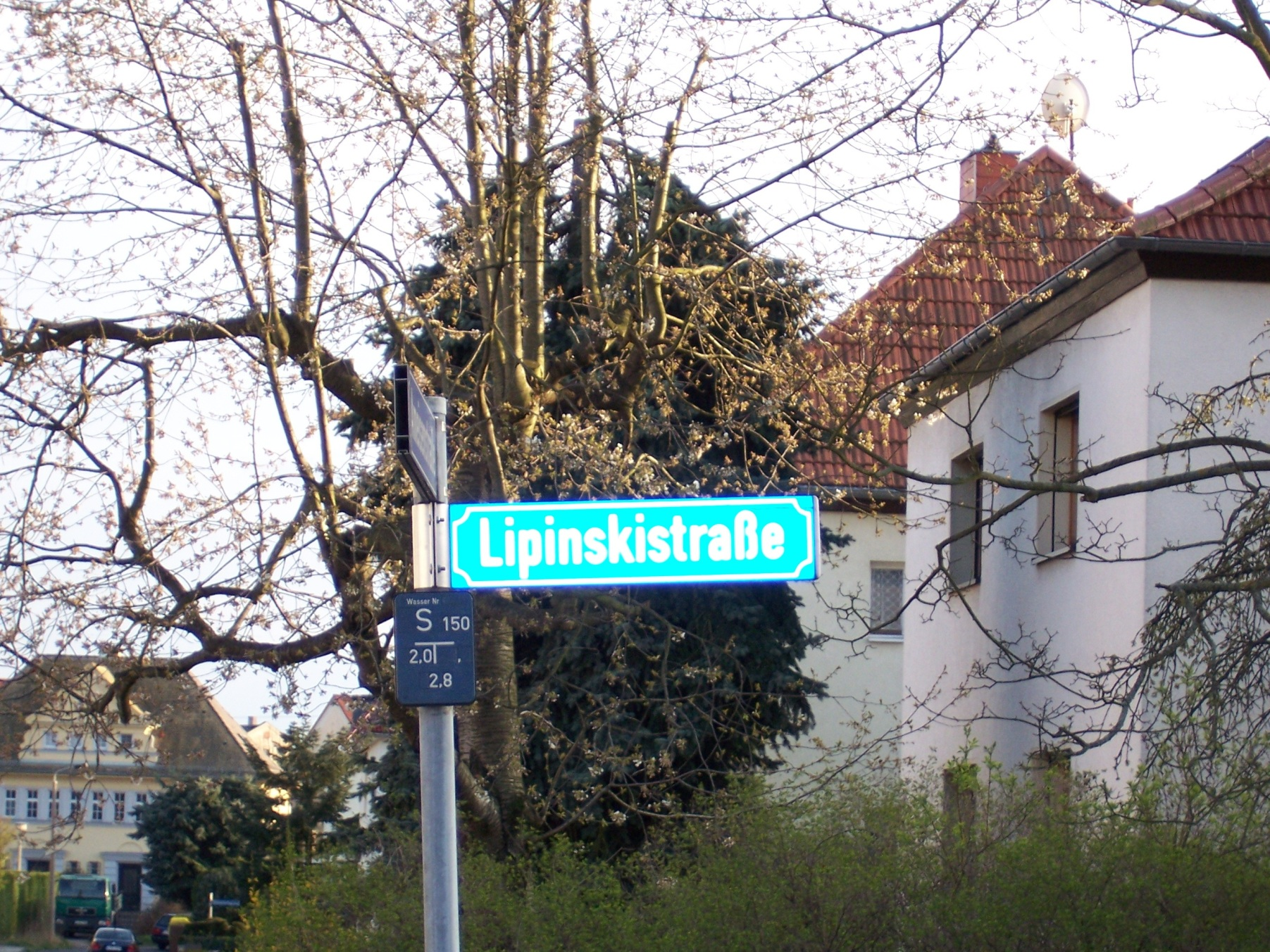
Lipinski Street in Leipzig

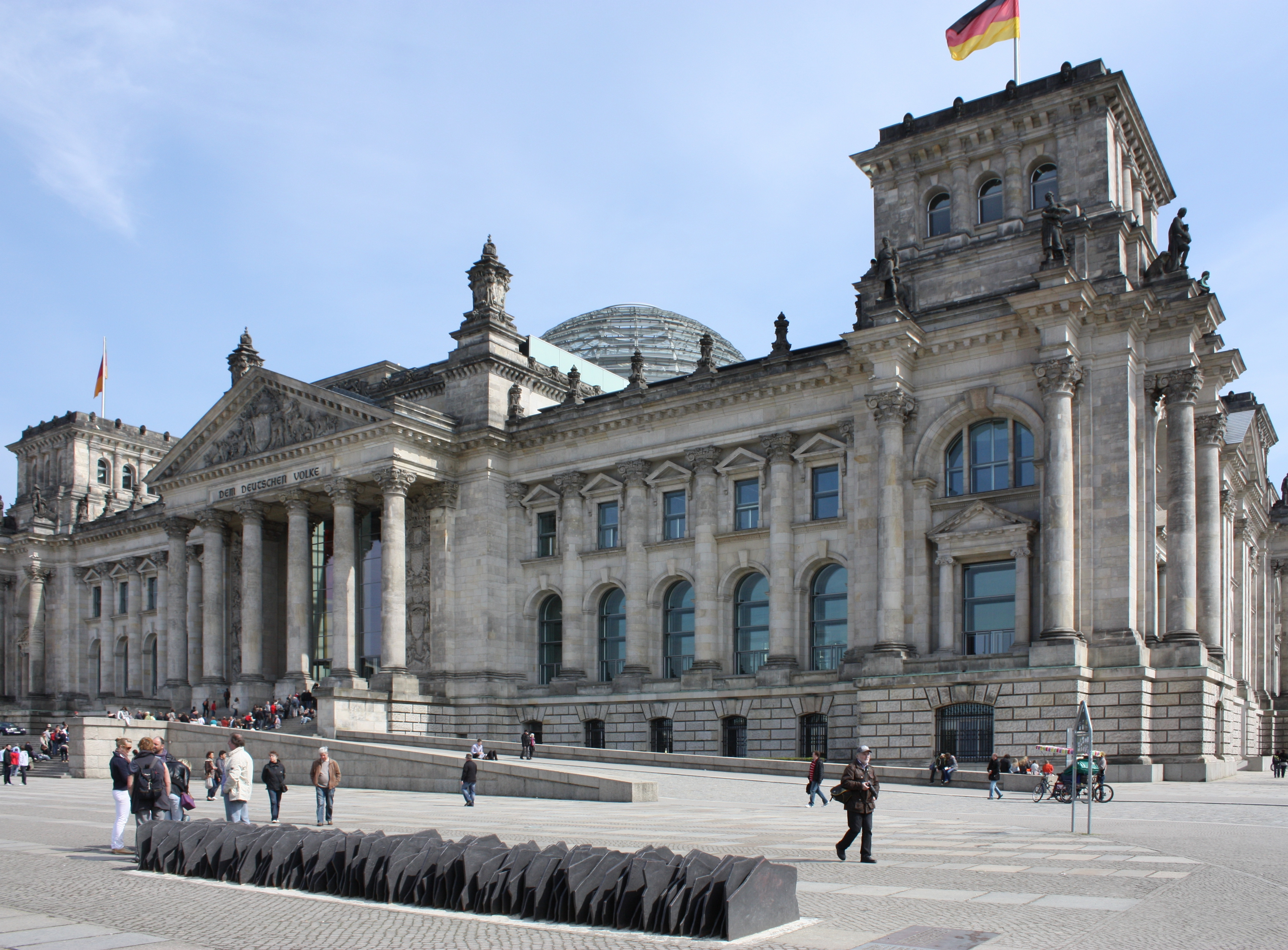
Plaques at the Reichstag

Since 1992, one of the 96 memorial plaques for members of the Reichstag murdered by the National Socialists has commemorated Lipinski in the Berlin district of Tiergarten park at the corner of Scheidemannstaße and the Republic Square. In the lobby of the Board Room of the SPD party in the Bundestag, a text plaque pays tribute to the Social Democratic parliamentarians who were against the Enabling Act of the National Socialists on 23 March 1933.

Since 6 November 1996, the Leipzig SPD house at Rosa-Luxembourg Strasse 19-21 is named Richard Lipinski's house. The renovated office, commercial and residential building were inaugurated by Inge Wettig-Daniel Meier in memory of the leading Social Democrats in Leipzig and Saxony. In 1945, a part of Kähte Kollwitz street was named after Richard Lipinski before the street name disappeared in 1962. In July 2000, the Leipzig city council renamed Ethel and Julius Rosenberg St (Großzschocher) to Lipinskistraße.

== Publications ==
Lipinski produced writings other than journalism. Social policy issues initially dominated his writing. He was the author of numerous political and socio-political writings, such as:

- The industrial employment, 1894
- The rights and obligations of the tenant, 1900
- The employment of clerks, law and the courts of clerks, 1904
- The kingdom of Associations Act, 1908
- The police in Saxony, 1909
- The social democracy from its beginnings to 1913.
- The People's Law School in Saxony, 1919
- Out of the church, 1919
- The struggle for political power in Saxony, 1926
- Documents on Socialist Law, October 1928
- The struggle for political power in Saxony, 1929
- The social democracy from its beginnings to the present (2 volumes, 1926-1929)

He was the publisher of the annual "The leader of Leipzig" from 1899 to 1933.

In 1893, he wrote a play titled "Peace on Earth".

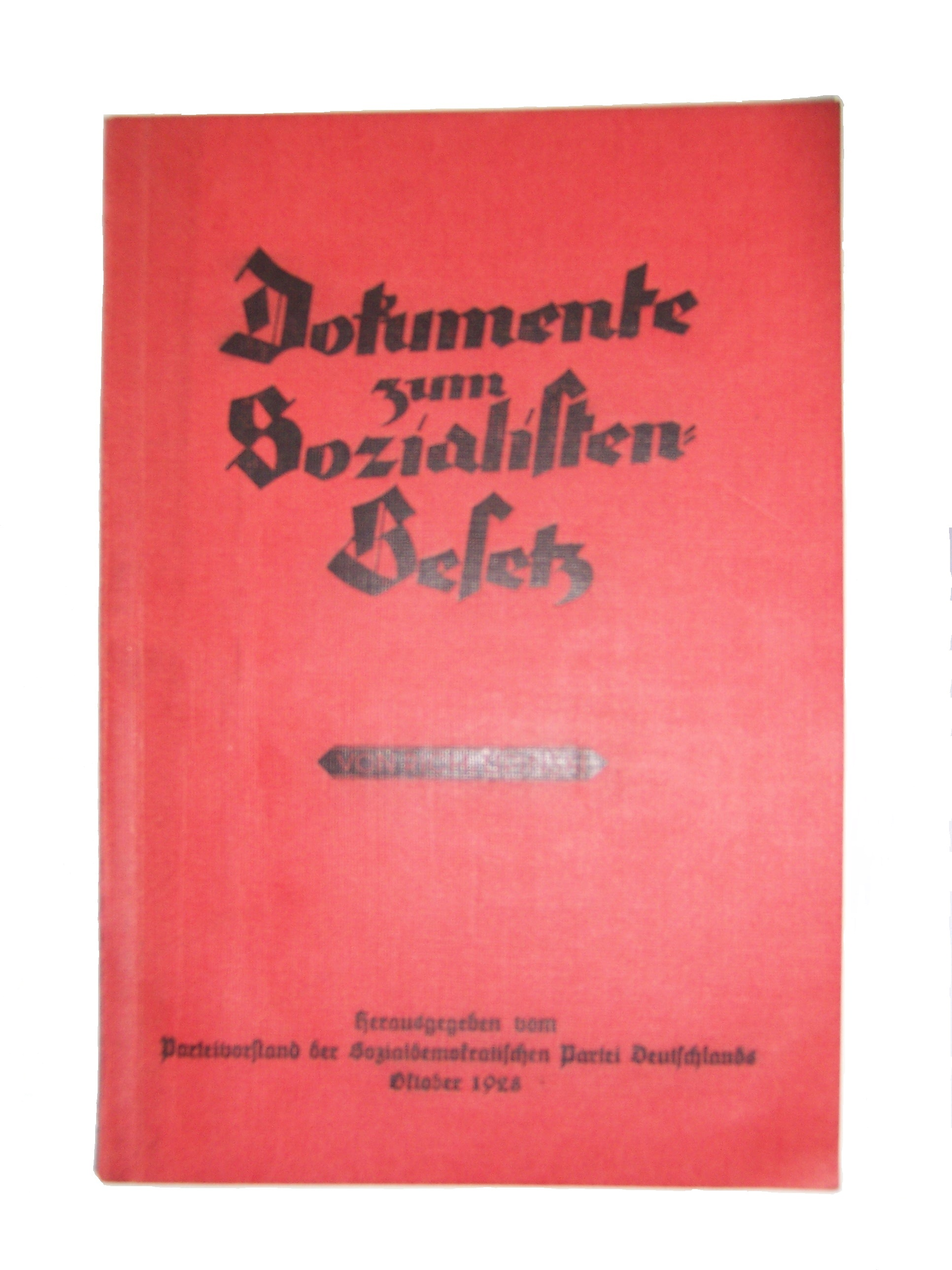
Documents on Socialist Law

== Sources ==
- Wolfgang Stärcke (1985). "Lipinski, Richard". Neue Deutsche Biographie (in German). Vol. 14. Berlin: Duncker & Humblot. pp. 643–644.
- Manfred Hötzel, Karsten Rudolph: Richard Lipinski (1867-1936). Democratic socialist organizer and political power. In: Helga Grebing, Hans Mommsen, Karsten Rudolph (eds): Democracy and Emancipation between the Elbe and Saale. Contributions to the History of the Social Democratic Labour Movement till 1933. Essen 1993, pp. 237–262.
- Michael Rudloff, Adam Thomas (in collaboration with Jürgen Schlimper): Leipzig. Cradle of German social democracy. Leipzig 1996, pp. 72 ff.
- Mike Schmeitzner, Michael Rudloff: History of Social Democracy in the Saxon parliament. Presentation and documentation 1877-1997. pp. 204 ff.
- Jesko Bird: The Social Democratic Party district of Leipzig in the Weimar Republic. Saxon democratic tradition. Two volumes. Hamburg 2006th
