= Paprotnia, Rawa County =

Paprotnia
- Village
- Location within Poland
- Coordinates: 51°42′35″N 20°33′15″E
- Country: Poland
- Voivodeship: Łódź
- County: Rawa
- Gmina: Sadkowice
- Population: 370
- Website: http://paprotnia.org

Paprotnia [paˈprɔtɲa] is a village in the administrative district of Gmina Sadkowice, within Rawa County, Łódź Voivodeship, in central Poland.
