= Zaborze, Łódź Voivodeship =

Zaborze
- Village
- Location within Poland
- Coordinates: 51°43′29″N 20°38′42″E
- Country: Poland
- Voivodeship: Łódź
- County: Rawa
- Gmina: Sadkowice

Zaborze [zaˈbɔʐɛ] is a village in the administrative district of Gmina Sadkowice, within Rawa County, Łódź Voivodeship, in central Poland.
