= Przyłuski (surname) =

Przyłuski (feminine: Przyłuska; plural: Przyłuscy) is a Polish surname. Notable people with the surname include:

- Bożena Przyłuska (born 1976), Polish secularist activist
- Jean Przyluski (1885–1944), French linguist
- Leon Michał Przyłuski (1789–1865), Polish Roman Catholic Bishop
