= Lubania, Łódź Voivodeship =

Lubania
- Village
- Location within Poland
- Coordinates: 51°41′N 20°36′E
- Country: Poland
- Voivodeship: Łódź
- County: Rawa
- Gmina: Sadkowice
- Population (approx.): 200

Lubania [luˈbaɲa] is a village in the administrative district of Gmina Sadkowice, within Rawa County, Łódź Voivodeship, in central Poland.

The village has an approximate population of 200.
