= Gogolin, Łódź Voivodeship =

Gogolin
- Village
- Location within Poland
- Coordinates: 51°43′43″N 20°33′10″E
- Country: Poland
- Voivodeship: Łódź
- County: Rawa
- Gmina: Sadkowice

Gogolin [ɡɔˈɡɔlin] is a village in the administrative district of Gmina Sadkowice, within Rawa County, Łódź Voivodeship, in central Poland.
