= Lipna, Łódź Voivodeship =

Lipna
- Village
- Location within Poland
- Coordinates: 51°41′10″N 20°37′39″E
- Country: Poland
- Voivodeship: Łódź
- County: Rawa
- Gmina: Sadkowice

Lipna (Polish pronunciation: [ˈlipna]) is a village in the administrative district of Gmina Sadkowice, within Rawa County, Łódź Voivodeship, in central Poland.
