= Mike Schmeitzner =

German historian (born 1968)

- Born: 29 July 1968 (age 57); Dresden, GDR (East Germany)
- Occupation: Historian

Mike Schmeitzner (born 29 July 1968, in Dresden) is a German historian. His focus is on twentieth century German history.

Schmeitzner was born in the southern part of what was then the German Democratic Republic. His 1968 birth year meant that his university-level education straddled the events that led to German reunification in the second half of 1990. He successfully completed his schooling in Dresden at the "Friedrich Engels Extended Secondary School (EOS) - Dresden south" in 1987 and then, in 1987/88, worked for VEB Robotron, a large electronics manufacturing operation. He then returned to academe, studying History, German Language, Culture and Linguistics and Education, initially at Dresden's Karl Friedrich Wilhelm Wander Pedagogical Academy and then at the Dresden University of Technology.

His work has focused on the History of the "Weimar Republic", of the Third Reich, of the Soviet occupation zone (SBZ / Sowjetische Besatzungszone) in what had previously been Germany, and on the formative years of the German Democratic Republic which grew out of it. He has also undertaken extensive historical research into nineteenth and twentieth century Parliamentary structures, Youth movements and left-wing Totalitarianism. He is a member of various academic bodies including the advisory board of the Saxony Memorials Foundation and of the Friedrich Ebert Memorial House. He is also a member of the Editorial board for the quarterly journal: "Dresdner Hefte. Beiträge zur Kulturgeschichte".

== Publications ==
(not a complete list)

Monographs

- Alfred Fellisch 1884–1973. Eine politische Biographie. Böhlau Verlag, Köln/Weimar/Wien 1999, ISBN 3-412-13599-2.
- mit Stefan Donth: Die Partei der Diktaturdurchsetzung. KPD/SED in Sachsen 1945–1952. Böhlau Verlag, Köln/Weimar/Wien 2002, ISBN 3-412-07702-X.
- Doppelt verfolgt. Das widerständige Leben des Arno Wend. Vorwärts-Buchverlag, Berlin 2009, ISBN 3-866-02077-5.
- Der Fall Mutschmann. Sachsens Gauleiter vor Stalins Tribunal. Sax-Verlag, Beucha/Markkleeberg 2011, ISBN 3-867-29090-3.

Collaboratively

- with Michael Rudloff: Geschichte der Sozialdemokratie im Sächsischen Landtag. Darstellung und Dokumentation 1877–1997 (= Beiträge zur Geschichte der Arbeiterbewegung. Band 40). Kommunikation Schnell, Dresden 1997, ISBN 3-000-02084-5.
- with Michael Rudloff: „Solche Schädlinge gibt es auch in Leipzig“. Sozialdemokraten und die SED. Peter Lang, Frankfurt am Main 1997, ISBN 3-631-47385-0.
- mit Andreas Wagner: Von Macht und Ohnmacht. Sächsische Ministerpräsidenten im Zeitalter der Extreme 1912–1952. Sax-Verlag, Beucha 2006, ISBN 3-934-54475-4.
- Totalitarismuskritik von links. Deutsche Diskurse im 20. Jahrhundert (= Schriften des HAIT. Band 34). Vandenhoeck & Ruprecht, Göttingen 2007, ISBN 3-525-36910-7.
- with Michael Richter, Thomas Schaarschmidt: Länder, Gaue und Bezirke. Mitteldeutschland im 20. Jahrhundert. Mitteldeutscher Verlag, Halle (Saale) 2007, ISBN 3-898-12530-0.
- with Christine Pieper, Gerhard Naser: Braune Karrieren. Dresdner Täter und Akteure im Nationalsozialismus. Sandstein Verlag, Dresden 2012, ISBN 3-942-42285-9.

Edited by...

- Richard Löwenthal: Faschismus – Bolschewismus – Totalitarismus. Schriften zur modernen Weltanschauungsdiktatur (= Wege der Totalitarismusforschung des HAIT. Band 1). Vandenhoeck & Ruprecht, Göttingen 2009, ISBN 3-525-32600-9.
