= Stary Folwark =

Stary Folwark may refer to the following places:

- Stary Folwark, Greater Poland Voivodeship (west-central Poland)
- Stary Folwark, Kuyavian-Pomeranian Voivodeship (north-central Poland)
- Stary Folwark, Podlaskie Voivodeship (north-east Poland)
- Stary Folwark, Warmian-Masurian Voivodeship (north Poland)
