= Dzięcioł =

Dzięcioł may refer to:

- Dzięcioł (film)
- Janusz Dzięcioł (1953–2019), Polish politician
