= Big Brother (Polish TV series) season 4 =

Big Brother
- Season 4
- Presented by: Karina Kunkiewicz; Kuba Klawiter
- No. of days: 106
- No. of housemates: 21
- Winner: Jolanta Rutowicz
- Runner-up: Katarzyna "Kasia" Lenartowicz
- Companion shows: Big Brother – Extra; Big Brother – Omnibus; Big Brother – Prosto z Domu; Big Brother Show

Release
- Original network: TV4
- Original release: 2 September – 6 December 2007

Season chronology
- ← Previous; Season 3 Next → Season 5

Big Brother 4.1 is the fourth season of the Polish reality television series Big Brother. The show followed a number of contestants, known as housemates, who are isolated from the outside world for an extended period of time in a custom-built house. Each week, one of the housemates is evicted by a public vote, with the last housemate remaining winning a cash prize. The show returned after five years break. It was launched on September 2, 2007 and concluded on December 6, 2007, last 106 days.

Karina Kunkiewicz and Kuba Klawiter host the main show Big Brother – Ring. Sideshows include Big Brother – Prosto z Domu Monday to Friday 18:30, a 30-minute live stream, viewers will be able to watch live how housemates deal with the special tasks set by Big Brother. Big Brother – Extra, a show for adult viewers: new, not broadcast in the live stream show at 18:30 or in recaps shows, reports from the Big Brother House. Big Brother – Omnibus, a summary of the past week on Sundays at 17:00.

Jolanta "Jola" Rutowicz walked out as the winner of Big Brother 4.1, winning a prize of 100,000 PLN.

== Housemates ==
Housemate	Age	Place
Jolanta "Jola" Rutowicz	24	Winner
Katarzyna "Kasia" Lenartowicz	22	Runner-up
Adrian Nadolski	22	3rd place
Mariusz Schulz	24	15th Evicted
Izabella Szubarga	32	14th Evicted
Marco Cammi	28	13th Evicted
Marian Szczepaniak	74	12th Evicted
Zofia Petka	74	11th Evicted
Katarzyna "Kaśka" Wiśniewska	24	10th Evicted
Joanna Chmielewska	22	9th Evicted
Paweł Mańka	19	8th Evicted
Agata Gawęda	20	7th Evicted
Magdalena "Magda" Czmuda	23	6th Evicted
Gerard Seczkowski	32	Walked
Mirosław "Mirek" Ptasznik	22	5th Evicted
Ewelina Chrapa	20	4th Evicted
Bartosz "Bartek" Lenert, Aneta and Martyna Bielecka	24	Ejected
Tomasz "Tomek" Peczak	30	3rd Evicted
Grzegorz Marcisz	23	2nd Evicted
Paulina Wysocka	19	1st Evicted
Katarzyna "Kasia" Szafron	21	Ejected

== Nominations table ==
	Week 1	Week 2	Week 3	Week 4	Week 5	Week 6	Week 7	Week 8	Week 9	Week 10	Week 11	Week 12	Week 13	Week 14	Week 15	Week 16	Final	
Jola	Ewelina; Kasia L	Kasia L Ewelina	Bartek; Tomek	Ewelina; Kasia L	Gerard; Mirek	Magda; Agata	Kasia L Izabella	Kasia L Mariusz	Joanna; Kasia L	Zofia; Kasia L	Kasia L Kaśka	Kasia L Zofia	Mariusz; Marco	No; Nominations	Izabella; Mariusz	No; Nominations	Winner (Day 106)	
Kasia L	Kasia S Paulina	Bartek; Gerard	Gerard; Bartek	Izabella; Ewelina	Izabella; Adrian	Adrian; Jola	Jola; Adrian	Izabella; Jola	Izabella; Paweł	Izabella; Joanna	Izabella; Marian	Izabella; Marian	Adrian; Jola	No; Nominations	Adrian; Izabella	No; Nominations	Runner up (Day 106)	
Adrian	Paulina; Kasia S	Agata; Tomek	Tomek; Bartek	Gerard; Ewelina	Gerard; Mirek	Magda; Kasia L	Kasia L Izabella	Kasia L Paweł	Paweł; Kasia L	Joanna; Kasia L	Marian; Kaśka	Kasia L Zofia	Kasia L Marian	No; Nominations	Mariusz; Kasia L	No; Nominations	Third place (Day 106)	
Mariusz	Not in House						Exempt	Kaśka; Joanna	Kaśka; Paweł	Joanna; Kaśka	Kaśka; Jola	Izabella; Jola	Izabella; Marian	No; Nominations	Izabella; Jola	No; Nominations	Evicted (Day 102)	
Izabella	Not in House	Magda; Tomek	Tomek; Bartek	Ewelina; Magda	Gerard; Kasia L	Kaśka; Marco	Jola; Adrian	Kasia L Kaśka	Kaśka; Kasia L	Kasia L Kaśka	Kasia L Kaśka	Kasia L Mariusz	Mariusz; Kasia L	No; Nominations	Mariusz; Jola	Evicted (Day 99)		
Marco	Not in House	Grzegorz; Jola	Bartek; Gerard	Magda; Ewelina	Agata; Kasia L	Magda; Kaśka	Agata; Kaśka	Joanna; Kaśka	Kaśka; Izabella	Joanna; Izabella	Kaśka; Zofia	Jola; Zofia	Jola; Izabella	No; Nominations	Evicted (Day 94)			
Marian	Not in House								Paweł; Kasia L	Kasia L Adrian	Kasia L Mariusz	Adrian; Kasia L	Adrian; Kasia L	Evicted (Day 92)				
Zofia	Not in House								Izabella; Paweł	Joanna; Izabella	Izabella; Marian	Adrian; Izabella	Evicted (Day 85)					
Kaśka	Not in House				Exempt	Izabella; Kasia L	Jola; Adrian	Izabella; Joanna	Izabella; Paweł	Joanna; Izabella	Jola; Izabella	Evicted (Day 78)						
Joanna	Not in House						Exempt	Paweł; Mariusz	Paweł; Izabella	Mariusz; Kaśka	Evicted (Day 71)							
Paweł	Not in House						Exempt	Kasia L Joanna	Joanna; Kaśka	Evicted (Day 64)								
Agata	Not in House	Adrian; Gerard	Gerard; Tomek	Izabella; Adrian	Izabella; Jola	Jola; Adrian	Jola; Adrian	Evicted (Day 50)										
Magda	Not in House	Izabella; Adrian	Gerard; Marco	Izabella; Adrian	Jola; Izabella	Jola; Adrian	Evicted (Day 43)											
Mirek	Not in House				Jola; Adrian	Evicted (Day 36)												
Gerard	Not in House	Agata; Kasia L	Tomek; Bartek	Izabella; Agata	Izabella; Jola	Walked (Day 36)												
Ewelina	Paulina; Kasia S	Adrian; Grzegorz	Marco; Adrian	Izabella; Adrian	Evicted (Day 29)													
Aneta/ Martyna	Not in House			Ejected (Day 25)														
Bartek	Not in House	Grzegorz; Kasia L	Tomek; Adrian	Ejected (Day 24)														
Tomek	Adrian; Jola	Adrian; Jola	Adrian; Marco	Evicted (Day 22)														
Grzegorz	Not in House	Bartek; Ewelina	Evicted (Day 15)															
Paulina	Ewelina; Kasia L	Evicted (Day 8)																
Kasia S	Ewelina; Kasia L	Ejected (Day 5)																
Notes	1	none	2	none	3	none	4	5	6	7	none			8	none	8	none	
Against Public Vote	Ewelina; Kasia L ~~Kasia S~~; Paulina	Adrian; Grzegorz; Kasia L	Bartek; Tomek	Ewelina; Izabella	Izabella; Jola; Mirek	Adrian; Jola; Magda	Adrian; Agata; Jola; Kasia L Kaśka	All housemates	Izabella; Jola; Paweł	Izabella; Joanna; Jola; Kasia L	Izabella; Kasia L Kaśka; Marian	Izabella; Kasia L Zofia	Adrian; Izabella; Jola; Kasia L Marian; Mariusz	Adrian; Izabella; Jola; Kasia L Marco; Mariusz	Izabella; Mariusz	Adrian; Jola; Kasia L Mariusz	All housemates	
Walked	none				Gerard	none												
Ejected	Kasia S	none		Bartek; Aneta/Martyna	none													
Evicted	Paulina −1.2% to evict	Grzegorz −0.6% to evict	Tomek −9.4% to evict	Ewelina −5.5% to evict	Mirek −3.8% to evict	Magda −0.8% to evict	Agata −4.6% to evict	Jola; Most votes to move	Paweł −7.6% to evict	Joanna −5.6% to evict	Kaśka −3.4% to evict	Zofia −11.0% to evict	Marian −3.2% to evict	Marco −7.1% to evict	Izabella; 5.9% to save	Mariusz −3.8% to evict	Adrian; 4.08% (out of 3) to win	Kasia L 18.59% (out of 3) to win
Evicted	Paulina −1.2% to evict	Grzegorz −0.6% to evict	Tomek −9.4% to evict	Ewelina −5.5% to evict	Mirek −3.8% to evict	Magda −0.8% to evict	Agata −4.6% to evict	Jola; Most votes to move	Paweł −7.6% to evict	Joanna −5.6% to evict	Kaśka −3.4% to evict	Zofia −11.0% to evict	Marian −3.2% to evict	Marco −7.1% to evict	Izabella; 5.9% to save	Mariusz −3.8% to evict	Jola; 77.33% to win	

=== Note ===
Housemate was given immunity and could not be nominated for eviction.
- ^1 Although Kasia S had been nominated for eviction, the eviction will still go ahead on Sunday. Up for eviction were Ewelina, Kasia L and Paulina.
- ^2 As part of the weekly task, all the female Housemates were given immunity
- ^3 Kaśka was immune as she is a new Housemate. Mirek was automatically nominated by Big Brother as punishment for discussing nominations.
- ^4 Agata, Kasia L and Kaśka have been automatically nominated by Big Brother for rule-breaking.
- ^5 These nominations were fake and in fact, all Housemates are up for eviction. The eviction on Sunday will also be fake, with the fake evicted Housemate moving to a secret room.
- ^6 Marian & Zofia were immune as they are new Housemates. Jola was automatically nominated by Big Brother as punishment for refusing to live in the secret room following her fake eviction on Sunday.
- ^7 Jola has been automatically nominated by Big Brother for rule-breaking.
- ^8 All Housemates have been automatically nominated for eviction by Big Brother.

== Opening titles ==
Big Brother 4.1's titles were an homage to the Big Brother Australia titles, using the same theme tune and eye.
