= Big Brother (Polish TV series) season 2 =

Big Brother
- Season 2
- Presented by: Andrzej Sołtysik; Martyna Wojciechowska; Grzegorz Miecugow
- No. of days: 113
- No. of housemates: 18
- Winner: Marzena Wieczorek
- Runner-up: David Rubasiñski

Release
- Original network: TVN
- Original release: 26 August – 16 December 2001

Season chronology
- ← Previous; Season 1 Next → Season 3

Big Brother 2 is the second season of the Polish reality television series Big Brother. The show followed a number of contestants, known as housemates, who are isolated from the outside world for an extended period of time in a custom-built house. Each week, one of the housemates is evicted by a public vote, with the last housemate remaining winning a cash prize.

The show was started on August 26, 2001 with Big Brother: Ty Wybierasz (lit. Big Brother: You Choose). And concluded on December 16, 2001, last 113 days.

Andrzej Sołtysik and Martyna Wojciechowska host the main show. Marzena Wieczorek walked out as the winner. The prize for him is 500.000 PLN.

== Big Brother: Ty Wybierasz ==
On Sunday, 26 August, 6 candidates (Barbara Knap, Jakub Jankowski, Alicja Dęręgowska, Ireneusz Górski, Krzysztof Czekalski, Małgorzata Witczak) entered the house for a week to take part the special show - Big Brother: Ty Wybierasz (lit. Big Brother: You Choose). At the end of the week (1 September 2001), the viewers chose two people (Barbara Knap and Jakub Jankowski) to continue to live in the Big Brother house.

Female		Male	
Name	Percentage	Name	Percentage
Barbara Knap	38.17%	Jakub Jankowski	68.40%
Alicja Deręgowska	34.23%	Ireneusz Górski	16.41%
Małgorzata Witczak	27.60%	Krzysztof Czekalski	15.19%

== Housemates ==
Name	Age	Residence	Occupation	Day entered	Day exited	Status
Marzena Wieczorek	30	Koszalin	Actress	1	106	Winner
David Rubasiński	24	Poznań	Photographer	1	106	Runner-up
Wojciech Witczak	40	Gniezno	Goldsmith	1	106	3rd Place
Arkadiusz Nowakowski	28	Gorzów Wlkp	Sales Representative	69	102	Evicted
Jerzy Kulicki	36	Zgierz	Fireman	1	99	Evicted
Agnieszka Lorek	23	Sosnowiec	Student	1	92	Evicted
Jakub Jankowski	27	Sosnowiec	Sales Representative	-6	85	Evicted
Anna Buchacz	21	Krakow	Student	1	78	Evicted
Ireneusz Grzegorczyk	31	Koło	Farmer	1	66	Ejected
Bogusława Adamczyk	40	Szczecin	Accountant	1	64	Evicted
Ilona Stachura	22	Krakow	Student	32	50	Evicted
Barbara Knap	32	Rzeszów	Bank manager	-6	36	Evicted
Karolina Jakubik	20	Gdańsk	Model	1	26	Walked
Wojciech Glanc	28	Gdańsk	Ventriloquist	1	15	Evicted
Big Brother: Ty Wybierasz
Ireneusz Górski	28	Wyszków	Fashion designer	-6	0	Evicted
Krzysztof Czekalski	25	Skierniewice	Assistant designer of building structures	-6	0	Evicted
Alicja Deręgowska	24	Konin	Unemployed	-6	0	Evicted
Małgorzata Witczak	25	Bydgoszcz	Hairdresser	-6	0	Evicted

== Nominations Table ==
	Big Brother: Ty Wybierasz		Week 2	Week 4	Week 5	Week 7	Week 9	Week 10	Week 11	Week 12	Week 13	Week 14	Week 15		
	Male	Female	Week 2	Week 4	Week 5	Week 7	Week 9	Week 10	Week 11	Week 12	Week 13	Week 14	Day 102	Final	
Marzena	Not in House		Jakub, Wojciech G	David, Jerzy	David, Jerzy	Ilona, Jakub	Agnieszka, David	Ireneusz Gr, Jerzy	David, Jerzy	Arkadiusz, David	Arkadiusz, David	Arkadiusz, Jerzy	Arkadiusz, David	Winner (Day 106)	
David	Not in House		Ireneusz Gr, Wojciech G	Ireneusz Gr, Karolina	Barbara, Ireneusz Gr	Agnieszka, Ireneusz Gr	Anna, Jakub	Anna, Jakub	Anna, Jakub	Arkadiusz, Jakub	Agnieszka, Arkadiusz	Arkadiusz, Marzena	Arkadiusz, Marzena	Runner-Up (Day 106)	
Wojciech W	Not in House		Ireneusz Gr, Wojciech G	Ireneusz Gr, Karolina	Agnieszka, Ireneusz Gr	Anna, Bogusława	Anna, Jerzy	Jakub, Marzena	Anna, David	Arkadiusz, Jakub	Agnieszka, Arkadiusz	Arkadiusz, Jerzy	Arkadiusz, Marzena	Third place (Day 106)	
Arkadiusz	Not in House								Exempt	Jakub, Jerzy	Jerzy, Marzena	Jerzy, Marzena	Marzena, Wojciech W	Evicted (Day 102)	
Jerzy	Not in House		Barbara, Wojciech G	Barbara, Jakub	Barbara, Jakub	Ilona, Jakub	Jakub, Marzena	Agnieszka, Ireneusz Gr	Agnieszka, Wojciech W	Agnieszka, Arkadiusz	Agnieszka, Arkadiusz	Arkadiusz, Marzena	Evicted (Day 99)		
Agnieszka	Not in House		Jakub, Wojciech G	Bogusława, Wojciech W	Ireneusz Gr, Jerzy	Jakub, Marzena	Jakub, Marzena	David, Jerzy	Jerzy, Marzena	Arkadiusz, Jerzy	David, Wojciech G	Evicted (Day 92)			
Jakub	Potential; Housemate		Ireneusz Gr, Wojciech G.	Ireneusz Gr, Jerzy	Ireneusz Gr, Jerzy	Ilona, Ireneusz Gr	Agnieszka, Jerzy	Ireneusz Gr, Jerzy	Anna, Jerzy	Arkadiusz, Jerzy	Evicted (Day 85)				
Anna	Not in House		Karolina, Wojciech G	Ireneusz Gr, Karolina	Agnieszka, Ireneusz Gr	Jakub, Marzena	Agnieszka, David	Ireneusz Gr, Marzena	Jerzy, Wojciech W	Evicted (Day 78)					
Ireneusz Gr	Not in House		Barbara, Jakub	Jerzy, Karolina	Bogusława, David	Bogusława, Jakub	Anna, Jerzy	Anna, Jerzy	Ejected (Day 66)						
Bogusława	Not in House		Barbara, Wojciech G	Barbara, Ireneusz Gr	Barbara, Ireneusz Gr	Ilona, Ireneusz Gr	Anna, David	Evicted (Day 64)							
Ilona	Not in House					Anna, Jakub	Evicted (Day 50)								
Barbara	Potential; Housemate		Ireneusz Gr, Wojciech G.	Bogusława, Ireneusz Gr	Agnieszka, Anna	Evicted (Day 36)									
Karolina	Not in House		Ireneusz Gr, Wojciech G	David, Ireneusz Gr	Walked (Day 26)										
Wojciech G	Not in House		Jakub, Jerzy	Evicted (Day 15)											
Alicja	Potential; Housemate		Evicted (Day 0)												
Ireneusz Gó	Potential; Housemate		Evicted (Day 0)												
Malgorzata	Potential; Housemate		Evicted (Day 0)												
Krzysztof	Potential; Housemate		Evicted (Day 0)												
Notes	(Note: Six Housemates entered on Day 1 as part of the special show - Big Brother: Ty Wybierasz. The phone lines immediately opened and two Housemates of each sex with the least save votes will be Evicted at the end of the Week.)		none	(Note: The nominations were voided and eviction voting canceled this Week after Karolina left the House. However, at the time of her leaving Karolina had amassed 95.82% of the Public Vote and would certainly have left, with the highest percentage in Big Brother History.)	none	(Note: David was immune this Week, but Jerzy was automatically nominated on after new Housemate Ilona drew straws to decide.)	(Note: This week Bogusława and Ireneusz Gr were Automatically Nominated after they losing a match and Wojciech W was Nominated by Big Brother because he broke a rule. These other five Nominees were Nominated the normal way.)	(Note: After Ireneusz Gr was removed for breaking rules, this Week's Eviction was Cancelled.)	(Note: As a new Housemate Arkadiusz was Exempt from the Nomination Process. He could neither Nominate, nor be Nominated.)	none	none	none	none	(Note: The final three Housemates all automatically faced the Public Vote to win.)	
Nominated For Eviction	Ireneusz Gó, Jakub, Krzysztof	Alicja, Barbara, Malgorzata	Ireneusz Gr, Wojciech G	Ireneusz Gr, Karolina	Agnieszka, Barbara, Ireneusz Gr, Jerzy	Ilona, Jakub, Jerzy	Agnieszka, Anna, Bogusława, David, Ireneusz Gr, Jakub, Jerzy; Wojciech W	Ireneusz Gr, Jerzy	Anna, Jerzy	Arkadiusz, Jakub, Jerzy	Agnieszka, Arkadiusz	Arkadiusz, Jerzy, Marzena	Arkadiusz, Marzena	David, Marzena, Wojciech W	
Walked	none			Karolina	none										
Ejected	none							Ireneusz Gr	none						
Evicted	Krzysztof; 15.19% to save	Małgorzata; 27.60% to save	Wojciech G 70.92% to evict	Eviction cancelled	Barbara; 41.10% to evict	Ilona; 38.77% to evict	Bogusława; 54.54% to evict	Eviction cancelled	Anna; 53.94% to evict	Jakub; 41.49% to evict	Agnieszka; 68.25% to evict	Jerzy; 52.01% to evict	Arkadiusz; 63.85% to evict	Wojciech W 27% to win	David; 34% to win
Evicted	Ireneusz Gó; 16.41% to save	Alicja; 34.23% to save	Wojciech G 70.92% to evict	Eviction cancelled	Barbara; 41.10% to evict	Ilona; 38.77% to evict	Bogusława; 54.54% to evict	Eviction cancelled	Anna; 53.94% to evict	Jakub; 41.49% to evict	Agnieszka; 68.25% to evict	Jerzy; 52.01% to evict	Arkadiusz; 63.85% to evict	Marzena; 39% to win	
