= Gać, Kuyavian-Pomeranian Voivodeship =

Village in Poland

Gać
- Village
- Location within Poland
- Coordinates: 53°28′N 18°48′E
- Country: Poland
- Voivodeship: Kuyavian-Pomeranian
- County: Grudziądz
- Gmina: Grudziądz
- Population: 224

Gać (Polish: [ɡat͡ɕ]) is a village in the administrative district of Gmina Grudziądz, within Grudziądz County, Kuyavian-Pomeranian Voivodeship, in north-central Poland.
