= Janusz Dzięcioł =

Polish politician (1953–2019)

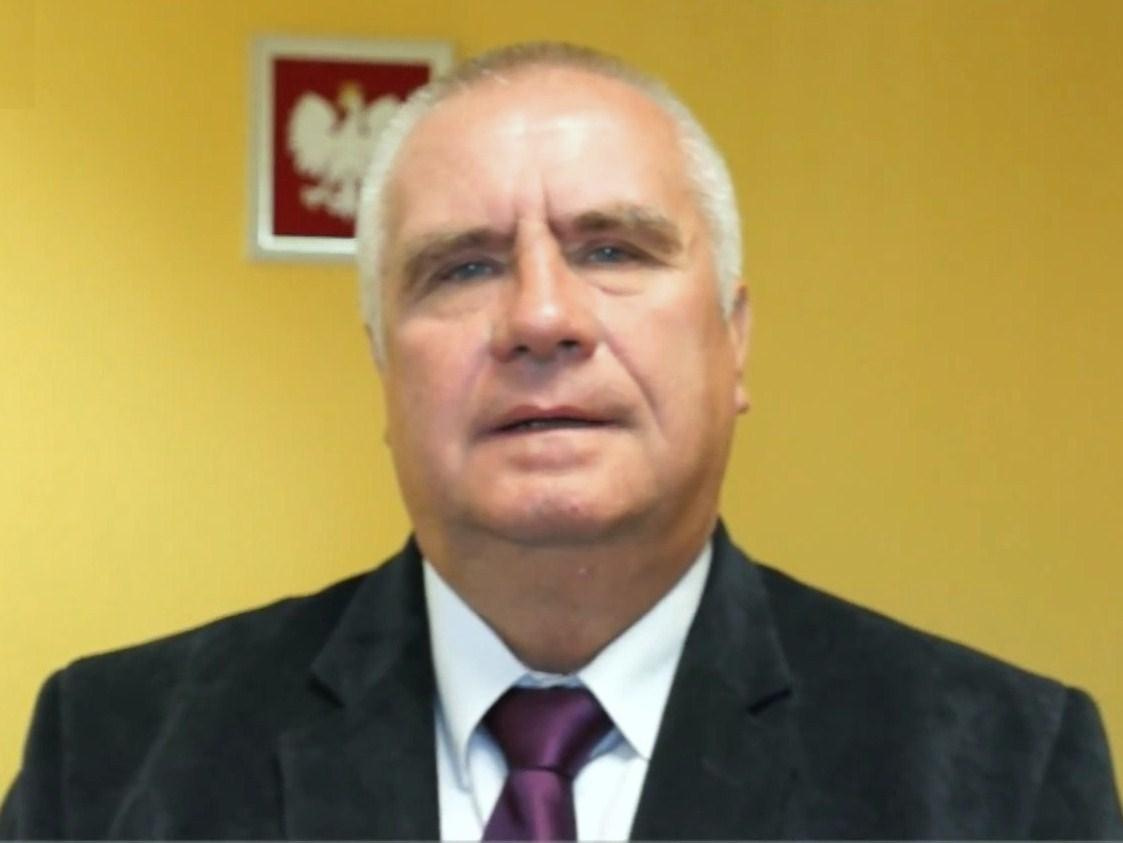

Member of the Sejm
- In office 5 November 2007 – 11 November 2015
- Constituency: 5 – Toruń

Grudziądz City Councillor
- In office 2002–2007
- Constituency: 5th district (2002-06); 4th district (2006-07)

Personal details
- Born: Janusz Andrzej Dzięcioł; 11 December 1953 Dąbrowa Chełmińska, Poland
- Died: 6 December 2019 (aged 65) Biały Bór, Poland
- Party: Civic Platform

Janusz Andrzej Dzięcioł (11 December 1953 – 6 December 2019) was a Polish politician, who was also known for winning the first season of Big Brother. From 2007 to 2015, he was a member of Sejm of Poland from Toruń constituency. From 2002 to 2007, he was a Grudziądz City Councillor.

He was also chief of the Świecie straż miejska, the municipal police force.

== Big Brother ==
Between March 2001 and June 2001 he participated in the first season of Polish Big Brother. He was the oldest housemate and was the winner of that season. After that program, he starred in the comedy movie Gulczas, a jak myślisz? (English: Gulczas, what do you think?).

== Political career ==
=== City Councillor (2002-2007) ===
In the 2002 election he joined the Grudziądz City Council IV term representing the 5th district. He polled 389 votes and was second on the Electorate committee "Ruch dla Grudziądza" list (Movement for Grudziądz).

In the 25 September 2005 he ran for the Senate of Poland VI term from the 5th constituency (Toruń-Włocławek) with the Civic Coalition. He failed to win election as one of the top three candidates with 28,549 votes (10.05%) leaving him 12th of 18 candidates.

In the 12 November 2006 he was re-elected to the Grudziądz City Council (V term). He got 1,028 votes in the 4th district, on the Civic Platform (PO) list. In 2007, when he was elected to the Sejm, his seat on the City Council was replaced by Wiesław Bernard Poliński, who was next on the party list.

=== Sejm member (2007-2015) ===
In the 2007 Polish parliamentary election, he joined the Sejm of Poland VI term representing the 5th constituency (Toruń-Włocławek). He polled 19,807 votes and was third on the Civic Platform list.

In the 2009 European Parliament election he was a candidate of the Civic Platform from Kuyavian-Pomeranian constituency.

In the 2011 Polish parliamentary election, he was reelected to the Sejm of Poland VII term. He did not seek reelection in 2015

=== After 2015 ===
Janusz Dzięcioł died in an accident after his car collided with a train on a level crossing in Biały Bór.

== Filmography ==
| Year | Title | Role | Notes |
|---|---|---|---|
| 2001 | Gulczas, a jak myślisz? | Himself (Janusz, city guard) | |

== See also ==
- List of Sejm members (2007–2011)
- List of Sejm members (2011–15)
