= Zakurzewo =

- Village
- Location within Poland
- Coordinates: 53°34′N 18°47′E
- Country: Poland
- Voivodeship: Kuyavian-Pomeranian
- County: Grudziądz
- Gmina: Grudziądz
- Time zone: UTC+1 (CET)
  - Summer (DST): UTC+2 (CEST)
- Vehicle registration: CGR

Zakurzewo [zakuˈʐɛvɔ] is a village in the administrative district of Gmina Grudziądz, within Grudziądz County, Kuyavian-Pomeranian Voivodeship, in north-central Poland.

Zakurzewo was a royal village, administratively located in the Chełmno Voivodeship of the Kingdom of Poland.
