= Gmina Grudziądz =

Gmina Grudziądz Grudziądz Commune
- Gmina
- Coat of arms
- Interactive map of Gmina Grudziądz
- Coordinates (Grudziądz): 53°29′33″N 18°46′34″E
- Country: Poland
- Voivodeship: Kuyavian-Pomeranian
- County: Grudziądz County
- Seat: Grudziądz

Government

Area
  - Total: 166.93 km^{2} (64.45 sq mi)

Population (2006)
  - Total: 10,359
  - Density: 62.056/km^{2} (160.72/sq mi)
- Website: http://www.grudziadz.ug.gov.pl/

Gmina Grudziądz is a rural gmina (administrative district) in Grudziądz County, Kuyavian-Pomeranian Voivodeship, in north-central Poland. Its seat is the town of Grudziądz, although the town is not part of the territory of the gmina. Meer of the Gmina Grudziądz is Jan Tesmer.

The gmina covers an area of 166.93 square kilometres (64.5 sq mi), and as of 2006 its total population is 10,359.

== Villages ==
Gmina Grudziądz contains the villages and settlements of Biały Bór, Brankówka, Dusocin, Gać, Gogolin, Grabowiec, Mały Rudnik, Mokre, Nowa Wieś, Parski, Piaski, Pieńki Królewskie, Rozgarty, Ruda, Sosnówka, Stary Folwark, Świerkocin, Sztynwag, Szynych, Turznice, Wałdowo Szlacheckie, Węgrowo, Wielki Wełcz, Wielkie Lniska and Zakurzewo.

== Neighbouring gminas ==
Gmina Grudziądz is bordered by the town of Grudziądz and by the gminas of Chełmno, Dragacz, Gruta, Nowe, Płużnica, Radzyń Chełmiński, Rogóźno, Sadlinki and Stolno.
