= Rozgarty, Grudziądz County =

Rozgarty
- Village
- Location within Poland
- Coordinates: 53°25′41″N 18°40′33″E
- Country: Poland
- Voivodeship: Kuyavian-Pomeranian
- County: Grudziądz
- Gmina: Grudziądz
- Population: 103

Rozgarty [rɔzˈɡartɨ] is a village in the administrative district of Gmina Grudziądz, within Grudziądz County, Kuyavian-Pomeranian Voivodeship, in north-central Poland.
