= Pieńki Królewskie =

- Village
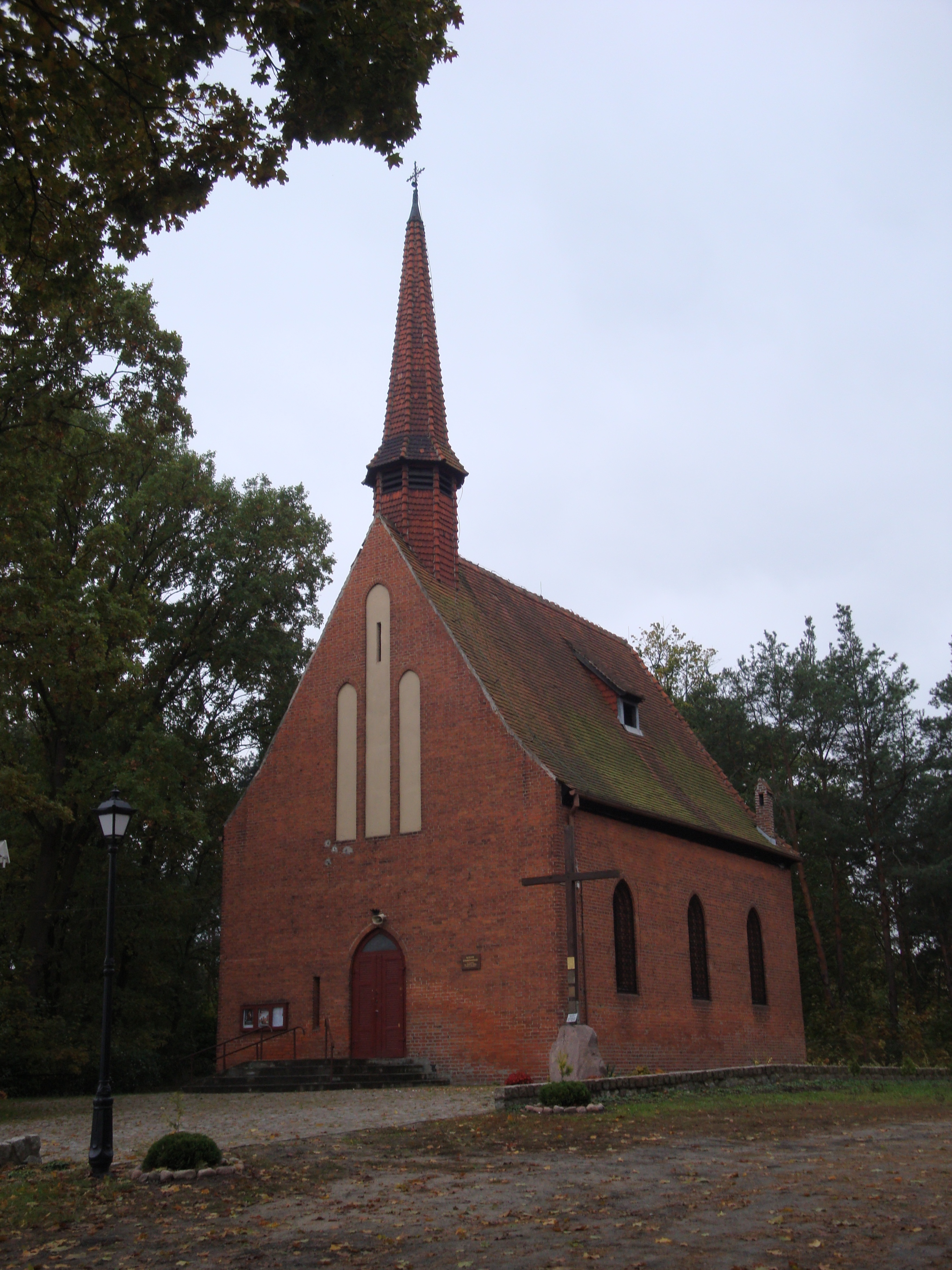
- Saint Andrew Bobola church in Pieńki Królewskie

- Location within Poland
- Coordinates: 53°25′N 18°42′E
- Country: Poland
- Voivodeship: Kuyavian-Pomeranian
- County: Grudziądz
- Gmina: Grudziądz
- Population: 110
- Time zone: UTC+1 (CET)
  - Summer (DST): UTC+2 (CEST)
- Vehicle registration: CGR

Pieńki Królewskie [ˈpjɛɲki kruˈlɛfskʲɛ] is a village in the administrative district of Gmina Grudziądz, within Grudziądz County, Kuyavian-Pomeranian Voivodeship, in north-central Poland.

== History ==
During the German occupation of Poland (World War II), Pieńki Królewskie was one of the sites of executions of Poles, carried out by the Germans in 1939 as part of the Intelligenzaktion.

== Transport ==
The A1 motorway runs nearby, west of the village.
