= Grabowiec, Grudziądz County =

Grabowiec
- Village
- Location within Poland
- Coordinates: 53°29′N 18°53′E
- Country: Poland
- Voivodeship: Kuyavian-Pomeranian
- County: Grudziądz
- Gmina: Grudziądz

Grabowiec [ɡraˈbɔvjɛt͡s] is a village in the administrative district of Gmina Grudziądz, within Grudziądz County, Kuyavian-Pomeranian Voivodeship, in north-central Poland.
