= Big Brother (Polish TV series) season 6 =

Big Brother
- Season 6
- Presented by: Agnieszka Woźniak-Starak
- No. of days: 92
- No. of housemates: 21
- Winner: Magda Wójcik
- Runner-up: Bartłomiej Boruc
- Companion shows: Big Brother Nocą; Big Brother Nocą+; Big Brother Raport; Big Brother Extra; Big Brother Tydzień; Big Brother Live (Note: Big Brother - Pobudka (Big Brother - Wake Up: 9:50), Big Brother - Popołudnie (Big Brother - Afternoon: 13:35), Big Brother - Podwieczorek (Big Brother - Afternoon teatime 16:40)); on player.pl: Big Brother Stars; Big Brother 18+; Big Brother News; Big Brother The best of

Release
- Original network: TVN 7 TVN; Player.pl
- Original release: 17 March – 16 June 2019

Season chronology
- ← Previous; Big Brother 5 Next → Big Brother 7

Big Brother Polska 6 is the sixth season of the Polish reality television series Big Brother produced by EndemolShine Polska. The show returned after 11 years hiatus and premiered on March 17, 2019, on TVN 7. The season lasted 92 days, with the final on 16 June 2019.

Agnieszka Woźniak-Starak hosted the main show Big Brother Arena. Filip Chajzer and Małgorzata Ohme co-hosted companion shows Big Brother Nocą (Monday to Thursday after 23:00) and Big Brother Nocą+ on Saturday after 23:00. They also co-hosted Big Brother Raport (Saturday at 20:00) until April 13, when it was replaced by the daily hour episode of Big Brother.

For the first time of Big Brother Polska, viewers could follow the life of the housemates for 16 hours per day on the internet. There were 4 special premium live stream channels on the website of the internet streaming and video-on-demand service Player.

== Production ==
=== The house ===
For the first time ever in Big Brother history, the housemates will live in a proper building rather than a constructed house in a studio. The house is the same house was used in the Polish version of Top Model, located in Gołków, a village nearby Warsaw. There are 66 cameras in the house, which are automatically controlled via a Wi-Fi network.

=== Season 7 ===
On June 12, 2019, It was revealed the seventh season will start in autumn 2019. Just three days before the finale, a housemate for the Big Brother 7, Karolina Włodarska, entered the house as a guest.

== Housemates ==
On Sunday, 10 March 2019, the public voted between 2 candidates - Agnieszka Raczyńska and Maciej Borowicz. Maciej Borowicz was chosen by the public to become the official housemate.

Name	Age	Occupation	Residence	Day entered	Day exited	Status
Magda Wójcik	31	Shoe shop employee	London	1	92	Winner
Bartłomiej Boruc	37	Painter and musician	Dublin	1	92	Runner-up
Igor Jakubowski	27	Professional boxer	Konin	1	92	3rd Place
Radosław Palacz	41	Carpenter	Piekary Śląskie	1	92	4th Place
Łukasz Darłak	26	Psychologist	Rzeszów	57	85	Re-evicted
Łukasz Darłak	26	Psychologist	Rzeszów	1	43	Evicted
Oleh Riaszeńczew	20	Construction company employee	Słubice	1	85	Evicted
Izabela Mączka	42	Advertiser	Warsaw	1	78	Evicted
Magda Zając	27	Farmer	Roztoka	17	71	Evicted
Kasia Olek	23	Jazz singer and photographer	Warsaw	1	64	Evicted
Justyna Żak	26	Interior designer and YouTuber	Białystok	1	54	Walked
Paweł Grigoruk	34	YouTuber	Białystok	45	54	Walked
Angelika Głaczkowska	32	Flight attendant	Białobrzegi	29	50	Evicted
Jakub Pyśk	26	Student and bartender	Mława	29	47	Ejected
Klaudia Marchewka	26	Ambulance driver and bodyguard	Kraków	1	29	Evicted
Karolina Wnęk	21	Family transport company employee	Lipnica Wielka	1	22	Evicted
Maciej Borowicz	31	DJ, event manager and fitness instructor	Poznań	1	16	Ejected
Tomasz Urban	34	Professional model	Gliwice	1	15	Evicted
Marlena Klimczyk	35	Detective office staff	Puławy	1	12	Walked
Natalia Wróbel	21	Unemployed	Bytom	1	8	Evicted
Daniel Barłóg	42	Sheep breeder	Sucha Beskidzka	1	7	Walked
Not selected
Agnieszka Raczyńska	26	Headhunter	Stargard/ London	1	2	Evicted

== Nominations table ==
	Week 1		Week 2	Week 3	Week 4	Week 5		Week 7	Week 8	Week 9	Week 10	Week 11	Week 12		Week 13 Final		Nominations received
	Day 1	Day 3	Week 2	Week 3	Week 4	Day 29	Day 32	Week 7	Week 8	Week 9	Week 10	Week 11	Day 79	Day 85	Week 13 Final		Nominations received
Magda W	Housemate	Maciej; Marlena	Tomasz; Marlena	Radosław; Karolina	Radosław; Klaudia	Magda Z Radosław	Not; Eligible	Jakub; Angelika	Izabela; Magda Z	Izabela; Radosław	Magda Z Izabela	Izabela; Igor	Radosław; Igor	Not; Eligible	Winner (Day 92)		14
Bartłomiej	Housemate	Oleh; Natalia	Tomasz; Justyna	Karolina; Maciej	Justyna; Łukasz	Łukasz; Magda Z	Not; Eligible	Oleh; Justyna	Oleh; Justyna; Paweł	Kasia; Magda Z	Łukasz; Izabela	Izabela; Oleh	Oleh; Igor	Not; Eligible	Runner-up (Day 92)		14
Igor	Housemate	Justyna; Marlena	Justyna; Tomasz	Justyna; Maciej	Izabela; Radosław	Kasia; Łukasz	Oleh	Kasia; Justyna	Justyna; Kasia	Kasia; Magda W	Łukasz; Bartłomiej	Łukasz; Magda W	Łukasz; Oleh	Bartłomiej; Magda W Radosław	Third Place (Day 92)		11
Radosław	Housemate	Łukasz; Magda W	Łukasz; Marlena	Łukasz; Justyna	Łukasz; Justyna	Kasia; Łukasz	Not; Eligible	Kasia; Justyna	Justyna; Kasia	Kasia; Magda W	Łukasz; Magda Z	Łukasz; Izabela	Magda W Łukasz	Not; Eligible	Fourth Place (Day 92)		18
Łukasz	Housemate	Maciej; Daniel	Maciej; Karolina	Maciej; Radosław	Radosław; Igor	Izabela; Radosław	Not; Eligible	Evicted (Day 43)		Exempt	Magda Z Radosław	Igor; Radosław	Oleh; Igor	Not; Eligible	Re-evicted (Day 85)		29
Oleh	Housemate	Marlena; Łukasz	Łukasz; Magda W	Justyna; Łukasz	Kasia; Justyna	Kasia; Magda W	Magda W	Justyna; Kasia	Justyna; Kasia	Kasia; Bartłomiej	Bartłomiej; Magda Z	Bartłomiej; Łukasz	Łukasz; Bartłomiej	Evicted (Day 85)			17
Izabela	Housemate	Justyna; Klaudia	Marlena; Tomasz	Justyna; Karolina	Igor; Klaudia	Magda Z Łukasz	Not; Eligible	Jakub; Angelika	Justyna; Oleh	Oleh; Kasia	Oleh; Łukasz	Łukasz; Oleh	Evicted (Day 78)				14
Magda Z	Not in House				Klaudia; Kasia	Kasia; Bartłomiej	Not; Eligible	Kasia; Bartłomiej	Justyna; Kasia	Kasia; Bartłomiej	Łukasz; Magda W	Evicted (Day 71)					15
Kasia	Housemate	Igor; Karolina	Tomasz; Karolina	Karolina; Maciej	Klaudia; Radosław	Magda Z Radosław	Not; Eligible	Angelika; Jakub	Magda Z Igor	Magda Z Radosław	Evicted (Day 64)						24
Justyna	Housemate	Izabela; Natalia	Izabela; Bartłomiej	Radosław; Karolina	Radosław; Klaudia	Izabela; Kasia	Exempt	Angelika; Jakub	Magda Z Igor	Walked (Day 54)							22
Paweł	Not in House								Magda Z Igor	Walked (Day 54)							0
Angelika	Not in House					Secret; Room	Izabela	Oleh; Bartłomiej	Evicted (Day 50)								4
Jakub	Not in House					Secret; Room	Exempt	Kasia; Magda W	Ejected (Day 47)								4
Klaudia	Housemate	Natalia; Kasia	Karolina; Justyna	Karolina; Maciej	Bartłomiej; Izabela	Evicted (Day 29)											8
Karolina	Housemate	Bartłomiej; Natalia	Łukasz; Izabela	Łukasz; Klaudia	Evicted (Day 22)												10
Maciej	Potential Housemate	Natalia; Magda W	Łukasz; Magda W	Łukasz; Kasia	Ejected (Day 16)												10
Tomasz	Housemate	Natalia; Oleh	Oleh; Łukasz	Evicted (Day 15)													6
Marlena	Housemate	Oleh; Magda W	Magda W Tomasz	Walked (Day 12)													6
Natalia	Housemate	Maciej; Klaudia	Evicted (Day 8)														6
Daniel	Housemate	Radosław; Maciej	Walked (Day 7)														1
Agnieszka	Potential Housemate	Evicted (Day 2)															N/A
Note	1	none	2	3, 4	none	5, 6		7, 8	9	10	11	none		12	none		
Against public vote	Agnieszka; Maciej	Maciej; Natalia	Justyna; Łukasz; Tomasz	Justyna; Karolina; Łukasz; ~~Maciej~~	Klaudia; Radosław	Kasia; Łukasz; Magda Z	Izabela; Kasia; Łukasz; Magda W Magda Z Oleh	Angelika; ~~Jakub~~; Justyna; Kasia	~~Justyna~~; Kasia; Magda Z	Bartłomiej; Kasia; Magda W Magda Z Radosław	Bartłomiej; Igor; Izabela; Łukasz; Magda Z Oleh; Radosław	Izabela; Łukasz	Igor; Łukasz; Oleh	none	Bartłomiej; Igor; Magda W Radosław		
Walked	none	Daniel	Marlena	none					Justyna; Paweł	none							
Ejected	none			Maciej	none			Jakub	none								
Evicted	Agnieszka; Fewest votes to be a housemate	Natalia; 52% to evict	Tomasz; 52% to evict	Karolina; 45% to evict	Klaudia; 57% to evict	none	Łukasz; 40% to evict	Angelika; 42% to evict	Eviction cancelled	Kasia; 48% to evict	Magda Z. 42% to evict	Izabela; 50.01% to evict	Oleh; 47% to evict	Łukasz; Igor's choice to evict	Radosław; 6% to win	Igor; 17% to win	
Evicted	Agnieszka; Fewest votes to be a housemate	Natalia; 52% to evict	Tomasz; 52% to evict	Karolina; 45% to evict	Klaudia; 57% to evict	none	Łukasz; 40% to evict	Angelika; 42% to evict	Eviction cancelled	Kasia; 48% to evict	Magda Z. 42% to evict	Izabela; 50.01% to evict	Oleh; 47% to evict	Łukasz; Igor's choice to evict	Bartłomiej; 21% to win	Magda W 56% to win	

=== Notes ===
This housemate was given or won immunity and could not be nominated for eviction for that week.
This housemate was automatically put up for eviction by Big Brother.

- ^Note 1 : On Sunday, 10 March 2019, a public vote started between 2 potential housemates - Agnieszka Raczyńska and Maciej Borowicz. They entered the house on Day 1. On Day 2, it was announced Maciej Borowicz received the most votes, therefore becoming the official housemate. Agnieszka Raczyńska was evicted.
- ^Note 2 : On Day 12, Justyna was nominated by Big Brother for breaking the rules.
- ^Note 3 : Maciej was ejected from the Big Brother house for multiple rules breaking .
- ^Note 4 : After Maciej's ejection, Justyna and Łukasz were the next two housemates to receive the most nominations. Therefore, they faced the public vote with Karolina.
- ^Note 5 : Because they failed to complete a task, Angelika, Igor, and Oleh had to instantly nominate one housemate each for eviction. Izabela, Oleh, and Magda W joined Kasia, Łukasz, and Magda Z facing eviction.
- ^Note 6 : As a surprise gift for Easter, the eviction was postponed to the next week. No nominations were held for week 6. The public vote for Izabela, Kasia, Łukasz, Magda W, Magda Z, and Oleh continued.
- ^Note 7 : Bartłomiej received a secret power to nominate one housemate directly for eviction. The rest of the housemates were given a mission to make Bartłomiej nominate them. Paweł was chosen by Bartłomiej. Instead of being nominated, he was granted immunity.
- ^Note 8 : Jakub was ejected from the Big Brother house for homophobic comments, racism, and vulgar behavior.
- ^Note 9 : The eviction for Week 8 was cancelled after Justyna Żak and Paweł Grigoruk left the Big Brother house.
- ^Note 10 : Because two Housemates left this week, the production brought Łukasz back to the House. He was exempt from nominations.
- ^Note 11 : Łukasz and Magda Z were originally nominated. After nominations, the housemates took part in Random Challenges. The losers were automatically nominated. In the end, Magda W won and she was the only houseguest not to be nominated.
- ^Note 12 : During Week 12 housemates participated in a task. During the Sunday eviction show, it was revealed that Igor got the most points and he has to choose three other housemates to join him in the finale. He chose Bartłomiej, Magda W and Radosław, which means Łukasz was evicted.

== Ratings ==
Official ratings are taken from Nielsen Audience Measurement.

	Week 1		Week 2	Week 3	Week 4	Week 5	Week 6	Week 7	Week 8	Week 9	Week 10	Week 11	Week 12	Week 13
Monday	-	1,170,464	705,142	876,953	680,086	680,086	579,863	701,562	633,554	726,618	615,657	554,807	579,863	579,863
Tuesday	-	1,116,773	751,674	776,730	687,245	783,889	655,030	522,592	680,086	740,936	544,069	751,674	515,434	565,545
Wednesday	-	1,106,035	737,356	701,562	640,713	619,236	597,760	651,451	712,301	626,395	705,142	597,760	486,798	526,172
Thursday	-	973,597	762,412	740,936	604,919	551,228	572,704	508,275	701,562	619,236	637,133	601,339	501,116	612,077
Friday	-	1,016,550	665,030	619,236	708,721	651,451	583,442	701,562	769,571	515,434	626,395	515,434	497,537	558,386
Saturday	-	690,824	465,322	472,481	569,125	529,751	561,966	640,713	551,228	501,116	522,592	476,060	552,592	422,369
Sunday	2,226,387	1,152,567	1,131,090	812,524	952,120	787,468	1,095,296	1,070,241	912,747	984,335	690,824	1,106,035	923,485	1,141,829
Weekly average	1,181,645		744,004	714,346	691,847	657,587	663,723	685,199	708,721	673,439	620,259	657,587	575,261	629,463
Season average	758,461													
