= Big Brother (Polish TV series) =

- Also known as: Wielki Brat
- Country of origin: Poland
- Original language: Polish
- No. of series: 7

Production
- Production companies: Endemol Shine Polska (seasons 1–3, 6–7); ATM Grupa

Original release
- Network: TVN (2001–2002); TV4 (2007–2008); TVN 7 (2019)
- Release: 3 March 2001

Big Brother (Polish: Wielki Brat) is a Polish version of the reality television franchise Big Brother produced by Endemol. The show aired from 2001 to 2002 on TVN, from 2007 to 2008 on TV4 and in 2019 on TVN 7.

== Format ==
Based on the original Dutch version created by Endemol, the show sees a number of "housemates", divided by gender, social backgrounds and geographical locations, locked up together in a house, where the viewing public can watch them twenty-four hours a day, and vote them out of the house as they choose.

The housemates can visit the "Diary Room" at any time during the day, either to talk to psychologists if they need to, talk to "Big Brother", or to nominate.

The title is inspired by the George Orwell novel 1984. The novel tells of a Big Brother, head of the totalitarian state of Oceania that constantly monitors its inhabitants by the camera in an attempt to suppress their free will. The tag line of the novel is "Big Brother is watching you", which inspired the show, as it is Big Brother who now has total control over the situation in the house.

The housemates live in a house 24 hours a day, bugged by numerous cameras and microphones which capture their every move. Every week the housemates participate in tasks that determine their food budget for that week, or could even affect that week's nominations. The overall goal is to be the final surviving housemate and claim the prize fund. A PlayStation game based on this version was released in 2003.

== Production ==
=== House ===
In the first three seasons, the house was located in Sękocin Stary near Warsaw. In the fourth and fifth season were located in Bielany Wrocławskie. From the sixth season, the house located in the town of Gołków near Piaseczno. For the first time ever in Big Brother history, the housemates live in a proper building rather than a constructed house in a studio. The house is the same house was used in the Polish version of Top Model.

=== Live stream ===
Since the fourth season, an internet live stream of the house was made available. From the sixth season, there are 4 channels of the live stream up to 16 hours per day on the Player.pl.

== Series overview ==
Seasons		Main presenter(s)	First aired	Last aired	Days		Housemates	Winner	Prize	Network	Average viewers (millions)
Big Brother 1		Martyna Wojciechowska; Grzegorz Miecugow	3 March 2001	17 June 2001	107		15	Janusz Dzięcioł	500,000 PLN	TVN	4.2
Big Brother 2		Andrzej Sołtysik; Martyna Wojciechowska	26 August 2001 ^{1}	16 December 2001	113 ^{1}		18	Marzena Wieczorek	500,000 PLN	TVN	3
Big Brother 3		Andrzej Sołtysik; Martyna Wojciechowska	3 March 2002	26 May 2002	85		17	Piotr Borucki	500,000 PLN	TVN	2.6
Big Brother 4.1		Karina Kunkiewicz; Kuba Klawiter	2 September 2007	6 December 2007	106		21	Jolanta Rutowicz	100,000 PLN	TV4	0.529
Big Brother 5	Part 1: VIP	Kuba Klawiter; Małgorzata Kosik	2 March 2008	6 April 2008	36	92	11	Jarosław Jakimowicz	2 watches with a total value of 50,000 PLN	TV4	0.377
Big Brother 5	Part 2: civilian	Kuba Klawiter; Małgorzata Kosik	30 March 2008	1 June 2008	64	92	16	Janusz Strączek	50,000 PLN & A Harley-Davidson motorcycle	TV4	0.231
Big Brother 6		Agnieszka Woźniak-Starak	17 March 2019	16 June 2019	92		21	Magda Wójcik	100,000 PLN & Mitsubishi Space Star	TVN 7	0.758
Big Brother 7		Gabi Drzewiecka	13 September 2019	15 December 2019	94		23	Kamil Lemieszewski	100,000 PLN & Fiat 500	TVN 7	0.494

^1 : Big Brother 2 was started airing with Big Brother: Ty Wybierasz on 26 August 2001, a week before the launch.

After 11 years break, the sixth season began on 17 March 2019 on TVN 7. On the stream service Player.pl website, live stream is available from 4 premium channels straight from the Big Brother house broadcasting 16 hours a day.

== Big Brother 1 ==
The first season of the Polish version of Big Brother.

== Big Brother 3 ==
The third season of the Polish version of Big Brother, also known as Big Brother Bitwa.

== Big Brother 4.1 ==
The logo for the fourth season of Polish Big Brother

Big Brother 4.1, is the fourth season of Big Brother Poland. The show returned after 5 years break.

== Big Brother 5 ==
The Big Brother 5 was divided into two parts: the first part is the one with celebrity (VIP) housemates and the second part is the one with civilian housemates. The season was premiered on March 2, 2008.

== Big Brother 6 ==
The sixth season of Big Brother Polska premiered in March 2019, 11 years after the fifth season.

== Big Brother 7 ==
The seventh season of Big Brother Polska premiered on 13 September 2019.
