= Nowa Wieś, Grudziądz County =

Nowa Wieś
- Village
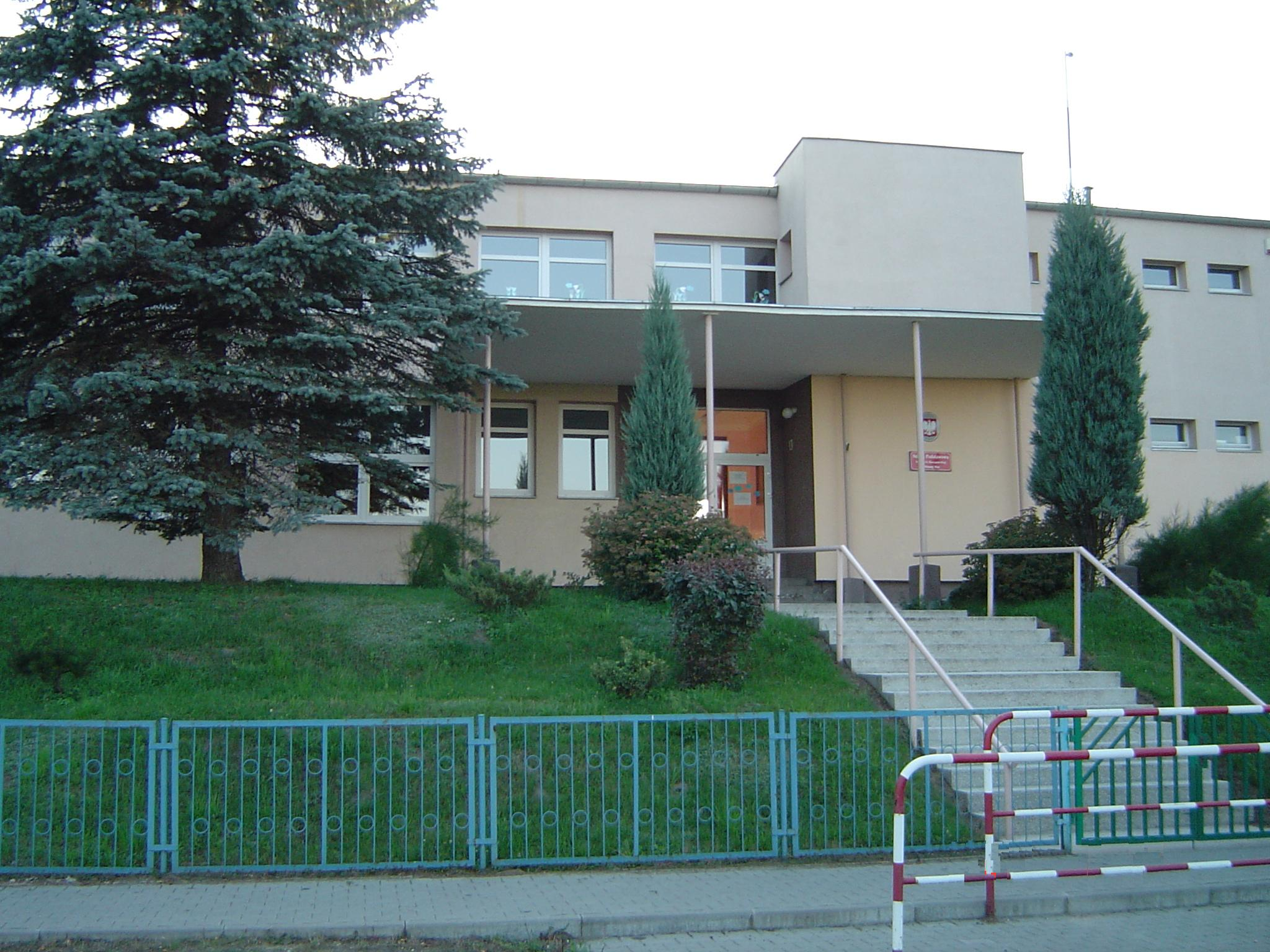
- School in Nowa Wieś

- Location within Poland
- Coordinates: 53°31′24″N 18°48′44″E
- Country: Poland
- Voivodeship: Kuyavian-Pomeranian
- County: Grudziądz
- Gmina: Grudziądz
- Population: 1,300
- Time zone: UTC+1 (CET)
  - Summer (DST): UTC+2 (CEST)
- Vehicle registration: CGR

Nowa Wieś [ˈnɔva ˈvjɛɕ] is a village in the administrative district of Gmina Grudziądz, within Grudziądz County, Kuyavian-Pomeranian Voivodeship, in north-central Poland. It is located in the Chełmno Land in the historic region of Pomerania.

== History ==
During the German occupation (World War II), in 1939, Polish farmers, workers and policemen from Nowa Wieś were murdered by the German SS and Selbstschutz in the large massacre of Poles committed in nearby Białochowo as part of the Intelligenzaktion.
