= Piaski, Grudziądz County =

Piaski
- Village
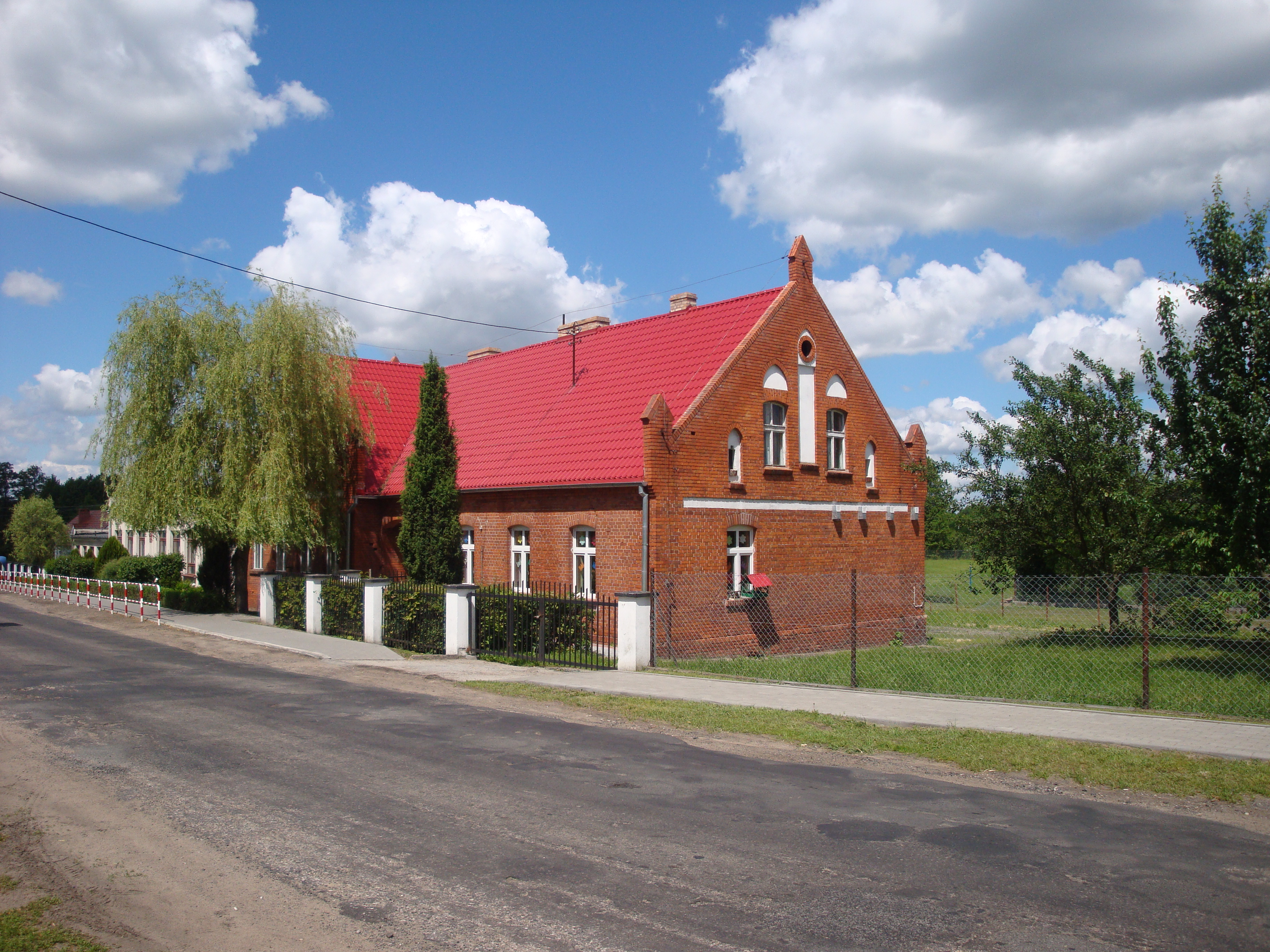

- Location within Poland
- Coordinates: 53°25′9″N 18°47′8″E
- Country: Poland
- Voivodeship: Kuyavian-Pomeranian
- County: Grudziądz
- Gmina: Grudziądz
- Time zone: UTC+1 (CET)
  - Summer (DST): UTC+2 (CEST)
- Postal code: 86-302
- Vehicle registration: CGR

Piaski (Polish pronunciation: [ˈpjaskʲi]) is a village in the administrative district of Gmina Grudziądz, within Grudziądz County, Kuyavian-Pomeranian Voivodeship, in north-central Poland.
