= Wielkie Lniska =

- Village
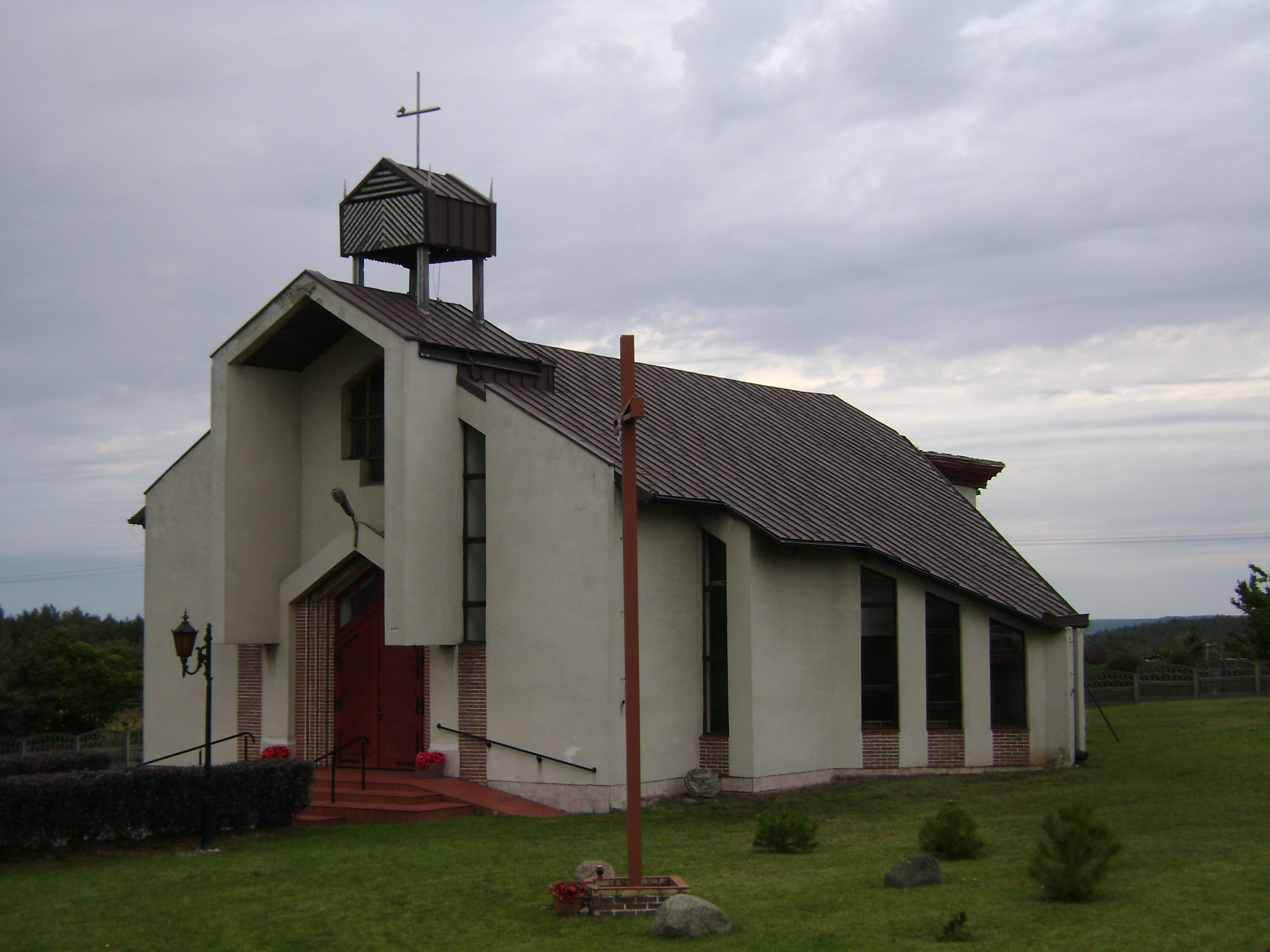
- Church of the Virgin Mary

- Location within Poland
- Coordinates: 53°28′34″N 18°50′27″E
- Country: Poland
- Voivodeship: Kuyavian-Pomeranian
- County: Grudziądz
- Gmina: Grudziądz
- Time zone: UTC+1 (CET)
  - Summer (DST): UTC+2 (CEST)
- Vehicle registration: CGR

Wielkie Lniska [ˈvjɛlkʲɛ ˈlniska] is a village in the administrative district of Gmina Grudziądz, within Grudziądz County, Kuyavian-Pomeranian Voivodeship, in north-central Poland.

== History ==
During the German occupation of Poland (World War II), Wielkie Lniska was one of the sites of executions of Poles, carried out by the Germans in 1939 as part of the Intelligenzaktion.
