= Sosnówka, Grudziądz County =

Sosnówka
- Village
- Location within Poland
- Coordinates: 53°24′44″N 18°36′58″E
- Country: Poland
- Voivodeship: Kuyavian-Pomeranian
- County: Grudziądz
- Gmina: Grudziądz
- Population: 210

Sosnówka [sɔsˈnufka] is a village in the administrative district of Gmina Grudziądz, within Grudziądz County, Kuyavian-Pomeranian Voivodeship, in north-central Poland.

In 2005 the village had a population of 210.
