= Ruda, Grudziądz County =

Ruda
- Village
- Location within Poland
- Coordinates: 53°23′38″N 18°42′5″E
- Country: Poland
- Voivodeship: Kuyavian-Pomeranian
- County: Grudziądz
- Gmina: Grudziądz

Ruda [ˈruda] is a village in the administrative district of Gmina Grudziądz, within Grudziądz County, Kuyavian-Pomeranian Voivodeship, in north-central Poland.
