= Parski, Kuyavian-Pomeranian Voivodeship =

Parski
- Village
- Location within Poland
- Coordinates: 53°32′00″N 18°46′05″E
- Country: Poland
- Voivodeship: Kuyavian-Pomeranian
- County: Grudziądz
- Gmina: Grudziądz

Parski [ˈparski] is a village in the administrative district of Gmina Grudziądz, within Grudziądz County, Kuyavian-Pomeranian Voivodeship, in north-central Poland.
