= Mokre, Grudziądz County =

Mokre
- Village
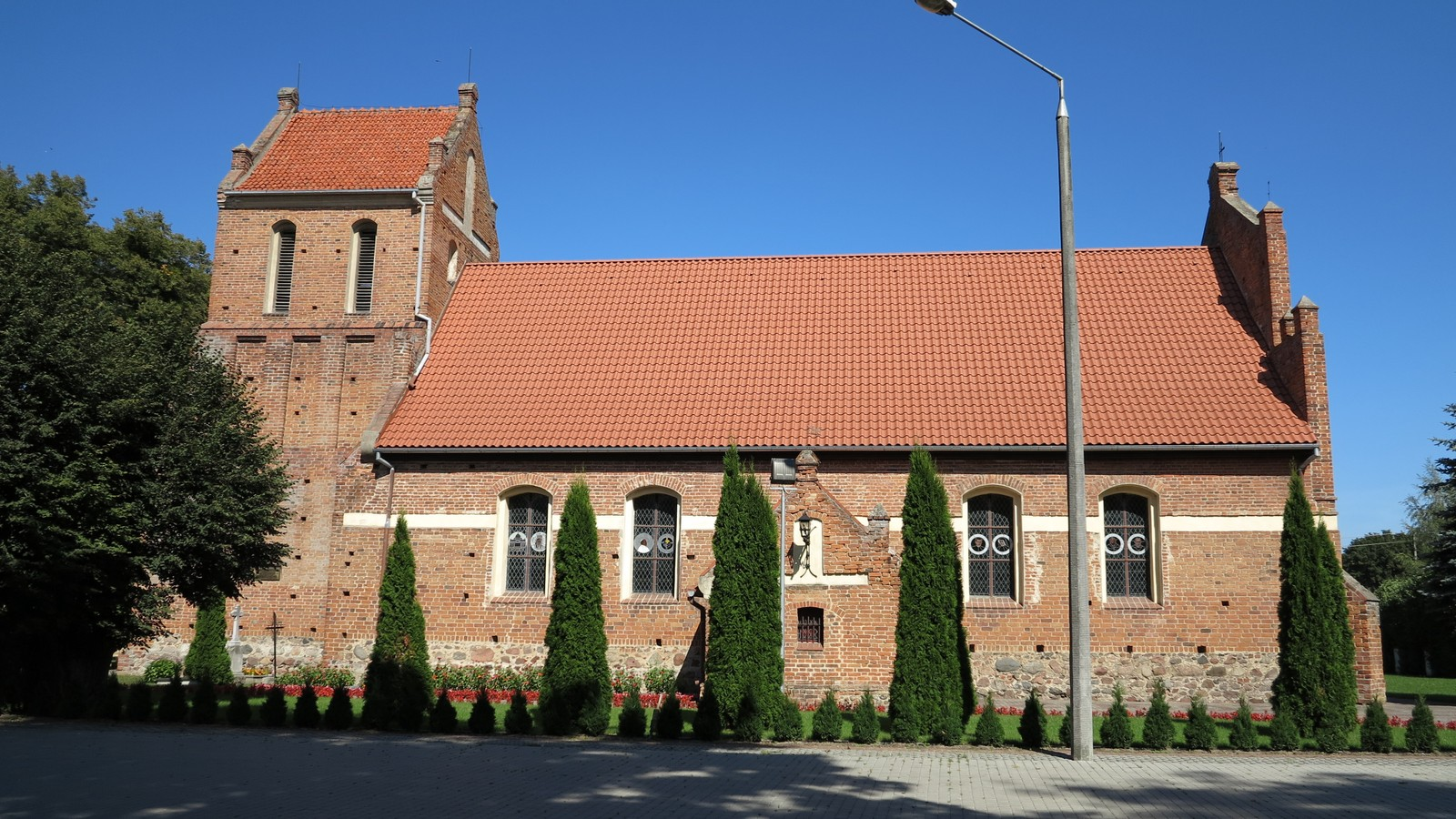
- Church of the Assumption of the Virgin Mary

- Location within Poland
- Coordinates: 53°33′N 18°49′E
- Country: Poland
- Voivodeship: Kuyavian-Pomeranian
- County: Grudziądz
- Gmina: Grudziądz
- Population: 930
- Time zone: UTC+1 (CET)
  - Summer (DST): UTC+2 (CEST)
- Vehicle registration: CGR

Mokre [ˈmɔkrɛ] is a village in the administrative district of Gmina Grudziądz, within Grudziądz County, Kuyavian-Pomeranian Voivodeship, in north-central Poland. It is located in the Chełmno Land in the historic region of Pomerania.

== History ==
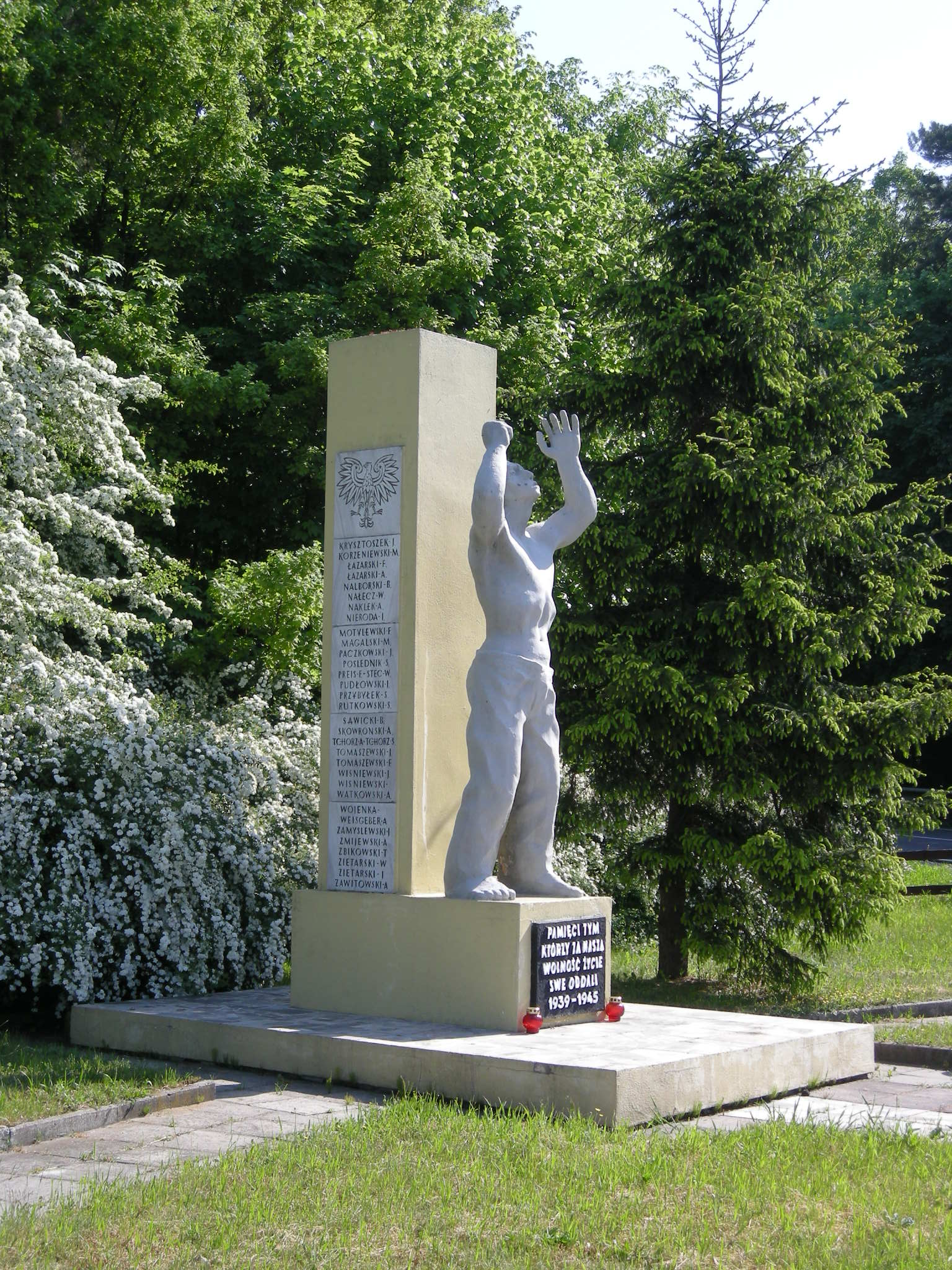
Memorial to local Poles murdered by the Germans during World War II

During the German occupation (World War II), in 1939, farmers from Mokre were murdered by the German SS and Selbstschutz in the large massacre of Poles committed in nearby Białochowo as part of the Intelligenzaktion.
