= Brankówka =

- Village
- Location within Poland
- Coordinates: 53°25′N 18°38′E
- Country: Poland
- Voivodeship: Kuyavian-Pomeranian
- County: Grudziądz
- Gmina: Grudziądz

Brankówka [braŋˈkufka] is a village in the administrative district of Gmina Grudziądz, within Grudziądz County, Kuyavian-Pomeranian Voivodeship, in north-central Poland.
