= Big Brother (Polish TV series) season 1 =

Polish television series first season

Big Brother
- Season 1
- Presented by: Martyna Wojciechowska; Grzegorz Miecugow
- No. of days: 107
- No. of housemates: 15
- Winner: Janusz Dzięcioł
- Runner-up: Manuela Michalak

Release
- Original network: TVN
- Original release: 3 March – 17 June 2001

Season chronology
- Next → Season 2

Big Brother 1 is the first season of the Polish reality television series Big Brother. The show followed a number of contestants, known as housemates, who are isolated from the outside world for an extended period of time in a custom-built house. Each week, one of the housemates is evicted by a public vote, with the last housemate remaining winning a cash prize.

The show was started on March 3, 2001 and concluded on June 17, 2001, last 107 days. For the needs of Big Brother, SMS Premium services were introduced for the first time in Poland.

Martyna Wojciechowska and Grzegorz Miecugow host the main show. Janusz Dzięcioł walked out as the winner. The prize for him is 500.000 PLN. The final of the season brought viewership to almost 10 million viewers making it the most-watched TV show in Poland in 2001.

== Big Brother: Ty wybierasz ==
On 25 February, as part of Big Brother: Ty wybierasz (lit. Big Brother: You Choose), the public vote was open to choose 2 candidates to enter the house from among 5 male candidates (Artur Parlewicz, Jakub Denys, Sebastian Florek, Wojciech Kromka and Wojciech Tęczyński) and 5 female candidates (Agnieszka Broda, Agnieszka Podgórska, Iwona Górnicka, Małgorzata Maier and Patrycja Strzemiecka). The public chose Małgorzata Maier and Sebastian Florek to enter the house on 3 March.

Patrycja Strzemiecka and Wojciech Kromka entered the house after Piotr Lato was ejected from the house.

Place	Female	Male
1	Małgorzata Maier	Sebastian Florek
2	Patrycja Strzemiecka	Wojciech Kromka
3	Agnieszka Broda	Artur Parlewicz
4	Agnieszka Podgórska	Jakub Denys
5	Iwona Górnicka	Wojciech Tęczyński

== Housemates ==
Name	Age	Residence	Occupation	Day entered	Day exited	Status
Janusz Dzięcioł	47	Grudziądz	City Guard commander	1	106	Winner
Manuela Michalak	26	Luboń	Trading company manager	1	106	Runner-up
Małgorzata Maier	34	Sosnowiec	Unemployed	1	106	3rd Place
Alicja Walczak	32	Gdańsk	Student	1	103	Evicted
Klaudiusz Sevković	30	Talfkirchen, Germany	Cook	1	99	Evicted
Piotr Gulczyński	32	Poznań	Advertising specialist	1	85	Evicted
Patrycja Strzemiecka	25	Świnoujście	Lifeguard	46	78	Evicted
Rafał Chudziński	23	Skierniewice	Construction company employee	61	71	Evicted
Karolina Pachniewicz	20	Olsztyn	Student	1	58	Walked
Wojciech Kromka	21	Warsaw	Student	46	57	Evicted
Grzegorz Mielec	28	Zielona Góra	Unemployed	1	57	Evicted
Piotr Lato	21	Warsaw	Student	1	46	Ejected
Sebastian Florek	30	Dorotowo	Farmer	1	43	Evicted
Monika Sewioło	23	Sucha Beskidzka	Unemployed	1	29	Evicted
Anna Baranowska	37	Lublin	Photocopying shop owner	1	15	Evicted

== Nominations Table ==
	Week 2	Week 4	Week 6	Week 8	Week 10	Week 11	Week 12	Week 14	Week 15		
	Week 2	Week 4	Week 6	Week 8	Week 10	Week 11	Week 12	Week 14	Day 104	Final	
Janusz	Anna, Manuela	Malgorzata, Piotr G	Piotr G, Sebastian	Karolina, Piotr G	Patrycja, Rafal	Manuela, Patrycja	Manuela, Piotr G	Klaudiusz, Manuela	Alicja, Manuela	Winner (Day 106)	
Manuela	Anna, Karolina	Karolina, Sebastian	Grzegorz, Piotr L	Grzegorz, Piotr G	Klaudiusz, Piotr G	Janusz, Patrycja	Klaudiusz, Piotr G	Alicja, Janusz	Alicja, Janusz	Runner-Up (Day 106)	
Malgorzata	Alicja, Piotr L	Karolina, Piotr L	Klaudiusz, Sebastian	Grzegorz, Karolina	Alicja, Rafal	Alicja, Patrycja	Alicja, Piotr G	Alicja, Klaudiusz	Alicja, Janusz	Third place (Day 106)	
Alicja	Janusz, Piotr L	Karolina, Monika	Piotr L, Sebastian	Klaudiusz, Malgorzata	Patrycja, Rafal	Małgorzata, Patrycja	Malgorzata, Piotr G	Klaudiusz, Malgorzata	Małgorzata, Manuela	Evicted (Day 103)	
Klaudiusz	Anna, Piotr L	Grzegorz, Monika	Janusz, Piotr L	Alicja, Janusz	Janusz, Rafal	Alicja, Janusz	Alicja, Janusz	Alicja, Janusz	Evicted (Day 99)		
Piotr G	Grzegorz, Monika	Grzegorz, Monika	Grzegorz, Janusz	Grzegorz, Janusz	Alicja, Rafal	Alicja, Manuela	Alicja, Manuela	Evicted (Day 85)			
Patrycja	Not In; House			Grzegorz, Janusz	Alicja, Rafal	Alicja, Janusz	Evicted (Day 78)				
Rafał	Not In; House				Malgorzata, Manuela	Evicted (Day 71)					
Karolina	Alicja, Anna	Malgorzata, Piotr L	Janusz, Piotr L	Janusz, Manuela	Walked (Day 58)						
Wojciech	Not In; House			Grzegorz, Karolina	Evicted (Day 57)						
Grzegorz	Anna, Janusz	Malgorzata, Sebastian	Piotr G, Sebastian	Alicja, Klaudiusz	Evicted (Day 57)						
Piotr L	Anna, Sebastian	Malgorzata, Sebastian	Piotr G, Sebastian	Ejected (Day 46)							
Sebastian	Alicja, Piotr L	Malgorzata, Monika	Grzegorz, Piotr L	Evicted (Day 43)							
Monika	Anna, Piotr G	Alicja, Sebastian	Evicted (Day 29)								
Anna	Karolina, Monika	Evicted (Day 15)									
Notes	none			(Note: Patrycja & Wojciech, as new Housemates, are automatically up for eviction in a separate vote to the nominations.)	none						
Nominated For Eviction	Anna, Piotr L	Malgorzata, Monika, Sebastian	Piotr L, Sebastian	Grzegorz, Janusz	Alicja, Rafal	Alicja, Patrycja	Alicja, Piotr G	Alicja, Klaudiusz	Alicja, Janusz, Manuela	Janusz, Malgorzata, Manuela	
Nominated For Eviction	Anna, Piotr L	Malgorzata, Monika, Sebastian	Małgorzata & Klaudiusz	Patrycja, Wojciech	Alicja, Rafal	Alicja, Patrycja	Alicja, Piotr G	Alicja, Klaudiusz	Alicja, Janusz, Manuela	Janusz, Malgorzata, Manuela	
Ejected	none			Piotr L	none						
Walked	none			Karolina	none						
Evicted	Anna	Monika; 82.73% to evict	Sebastian; 72.96% to evict	Grzegorz; 54.03% to evict	Rafal; 68.68% to evict	Patrycja; 72.70% to evict	Piotr G 56.79% to evict	Klaudiusz; 51.14% to evict	Alicja; 51% to evict	Małgorzata; 5.55% to win	Manuela; 27.61% to win
Evicted	Anna	Monika; 82.73% to evict	Małgorzata & Klaudiusz; 86% to stay	Wojciech; 53% to evict	Rafal; 68.68% to evict	Patrycja; 72.70% to evict	Piotr G 56.79% to evict	Klaudiusz; 51.14% to evict	Alicja; 51% to evict	Janusz; 66.84% to win	
