= Big Brother (Polish TV series) season 3 =

Third season of the Polish reality television series Big Brother

Big Brother
- Season 3
- Presented by: Andrzej Sołtysik; Martyna Wojciechowska; Grzegorz Miecugow
- No. of days: 85
- No. of housemates: 17
- Winner: Piotr Borucki
- Runner-up: Andrzej Galica

Release
- Original network: TVN
- Original release: 3 March – 26 May 2002

Season chronology
- ← Previous; Season 2 Next → Season 4

Big Brother Bitwa (Big Brother Battle) is the third season of the Polish reality television series Big Brother. The show followed a number of contestants, known as housemates, who are isolated from the outside world for an extended period of time in a custom-built house. Each week, one of the housemates is evicted by a public vote, with the last housemate remaining winning a cash prize. The show was launched on March 3, 2002 and concluded on May 26, 2002, last 85 days.

In 2002, a new format of the Big Brother show has been implemented in the Netherlands and Poland. Fourteen housemates are divided into two teams: red and blue. After a week, the two housemates who gained the most votes of viewers become captains. Teams fight with each other and play various competitions or battles. The winner of each battle has specific privileges, comforts and rewards. The winning team gains immunity from nominations and benefits from a whole system of privileges that only belong to them and which cannot be used by losers. One housemate from the losing team will leave the game. Big Brother watches over the rivalry of both teams and doesn't tolerate any compromises or arrangements. Big Brother house was divided into two parts. The first is the residential part, where the decor and equipment have changed. One bedroom belongs to the losers and the other to the winners. The second part is a battlefield surrounded by barbed wire with an area of 200 square meters, which includes obstacles, towers and pits inhabited by rats.

Andrzej Sołtysik and Martyna Wojciechowska host the main show.

Finally, Piotr Borucki walked out as the winner. The prize for him is 500.000 PLN.

== Housemates ==
Housemate	Age	Place
Piotr Borucki	24	Winner
Andrzej Galica	31	2nd Place
Katarzyna Janasik	30	3rd Place
Joanna Biernacka	23	4th Place
Tadeusz Ostrowski	41	9th Evicted
Arkadiusz Batorski	35	8th Evicted
Magdalena Szewczyk	34	7th Evicted
Monika Brochacka	22	6th Evicted
Paweł Iwuć	20	5th Evicted
Agnieszka Frykowska	24	4th Evicted
Anna Hoksa	25	Ejected
Łukasz Wiewiórski	25	3rd Evicted
Agnieszka Koziołek	24	2nd Evicted
Katarzyna Woźna	19	Walked
Wojciech Bernacki	31	Walked
Ireneusz Próchenko	41	1st Evicted
Karolina Pikiewicz	20	Ejected

== Nominations table ==
Housemates on the Red team
Housemates on the Blue team

	Week 2	Week 4	Week 5	Week 6	Week 7	Week 8	Week 9	Week 10	Week 11		Week 12	Final	
	Week 2	Week 4	Week 5	Week 6	Week 7	Week 8	Week 9	Week 10	House vote	Nomination	Week 12	Final	
Piotr	Agnieszka K Wojciech	No; Nominations	Lukasz; Magdalena	Lukasz; Pawel	Agnieszka F Katarzyna J	Katarzyna J Pawel	Katarzyna J Magdalena	Katarzyna J Magdalena	Tadeusz	Arkadiusz; Andrzej	Joanna; Katarzyna J	Winner (Day 85)	
Andrzej	Agnieszka K Wojciech	No; Nominations	Katarzyna W Lukasz	Agnieszka F Lukasz	Agnieszka F Pawel	Monika; Pawel	Monika; Piotr	Monika; Piotr	Tadeusz	Arkadiusz; Katarzyna J	Joanna; Katarzyna J	Runner up (Day 85)	
Katarzyna J	Andrzej; Wojciech	No; Nominations	Lukasz; Pawel	Agnieszka F Lukasz	Andrzej; Piotr	Andrzej; Monika	Andrzej; Monika	Andrzej; Monika	Tadeusz	Piotr; Andrzej	Andrzej; Joanna	Third Place (Day 85)	
Joanna	Not in House								Nominated	Exempt	Andrzej; Piotr	Evicted (Day 82)	
Arkadiusz	Agnieszka K Wojciech	No; Nominations	Lukasz; Magdalena	Agnieszka F Lukasz	Agnieszka F Pawel	Monika; Pawel	Monika; Piotr	Monika; Piotr	Tadeusz	Piotr; Andrzej	Evicted (Day 78)		
Tadeusz	Not in House								Nominated	Evicted (Day 76)			
Magdalena	Arkadiusz; Piotr	No; Nominations	Arkadiusz; Lukasz	Agnieszka F Lukasz	Agnieszka F Piotr	Monika; Piotr	Monika; Piotr	Monika; Piotr	Evicted (Day 71)				
Monika	Not in House				Exempt	Andrzej; Magdalena	Andrzej; Magdalena	Evicted (Day 64)					
Pawel	Anna; Wojciech	No; Nominations	Agnieszka F Andrzej	Agnieszka F Andrzej	Andrzej; Piotr	Monika; Piotr	Evicted (Day 57)						
Agnieszka F	Arkadiusz; Wojciech	No; Nominations	Katarzyna W Lukasz	Arkadiusz; Katarzyna J	Magdalena; Pawel	Evicted (Day 50)							
Anna	Andrzej; Piotr	No; Nominations	Katarzyna W Lukasz	Lukasz	Refused	Ejected (Day 45)							
Lukasz	Arkadiusz; Wojciech; Ireneusz	No; Nominations	Arkadiusz; Katarzyna W	Andrzej; Arkadiusz	Evicted (Day 43)								
Agnieszka K	Refused	Nominated	Katarzyna W Lukasz	Evicted (Day 37)									
Katarzyna W	Anna; Arkadiusz	No; Nominations	Andrzej; Lukasz	Walked (Day 31)									
Wojciech	Refused	Nominated	Walked (Day 23)										
Ireneusz	Arkadiusz; Piotr	Evicted (Day 15)											
Karolina	Ejected (Day 4)												
Notes	(Note: The Red Team won the task, meaning only members of the Blue Team could be nominated for eviction. Agnieszka K and Wojciech decided not to nominate.) (Note: Ireneusz was automatically nominated for breaking the rules.)	(Note: On day 21 Agnieszka K and Wojciech were automatically nominated for eviction since Wojciech walked on day 22 the eviction was canceled.)	(Note: Agnieszka K. was automatically nominated due to her not nominating in Round 1.)	(Note: Anna was automatically nominated for refusing to nominate a second person.)	(Note: Anna was kicked out on day 45 for refusing to nominate for the second time.)	none		(Note: Piotr moved to the Red Team to even up the numbers.)	(Note: Housemates had to vote for which new Housemate should be evicted.)	(Note: Katarzyna J. initially refused to nominate, she changed her mind when Big Brother said she would be ejected if she didn't. Arkadiusz refused to nominate, Big Brother said he would be ejected if he didn't. He was given another chance to nominate a few days later but again refused. Big Brother asked the public if Arkadiusz should be given another chance to nominate or if he should be ejected, the public decided to let Arkadiusz stay in the house and gave him one more chance to nominate, he finally agreed to nominate.)	none	(Note: The public was voting for who they wanted to win instead of who they wanted to evict.)	
Up for eviction	Arkadiusz; Ireneusz; Wojciech	Agnieszka K Wojciech	Agnieszka K ~~Katarzyna W~~; Lukasz	Agnieszka F Anna; Lukasz	Agnieszka F Pawel; Piotr	Monika; Pawel	Monika; Piotr	Andrzej; Katarzyna J Magdalena; Piotr	Joanna; Tadeusz	Andrzej; Arkadiusz; Piotr	Andrzej; Joanna; Katarzyna J	Andrzej; Katarzyna J Piotr	
Walked	none	Wojciech	Katarzyna W	none									
Ejected	Karolina	none			Anna	none							
Evicted	Ireneusz; 77.82% to evict	Eviction cancelled	Agnieszka K 52.79% to evict	Lukasz; 69.15% to evict	Agnieszka F 68.83% to evict	Pawel; 73.81% to evict	Monika; 65.52% to evict	Magdalena; 78.14% to evict	Tadeusz; 4 of 4 votes to evict	Arkadiusz; 59.91% to evict	Joanna; 45.14% to evict	Katarzyna J 21.52% to win	Andrzej; 26.79% to win
Evicted	Ireneusz; 77.82% to evict	Eviction cancelled	Agnieszka K 52.79% to evict	Lukasz; 69.15% to evict	Agnieszka F 68.83% to evict	Pawel; 73.81% to evict	Monika; 65.52% to evict	Magdalena; 78.14% to evict	Tadeusz; 4 of 4 votes to evict	Arkadiusz; 59.91% to evict	Joanna; 45.14% to evict	Piotr; 51.69% to win	
