= Turznice =

- Village
- Location within Poland
- Coordinates: 53°24′26″N 18°47′56″E
- Country: Poland
- Voivodeship: Kuyavian-Pomeranian
- County: Grudziądz
- Gmina: Grudziądz

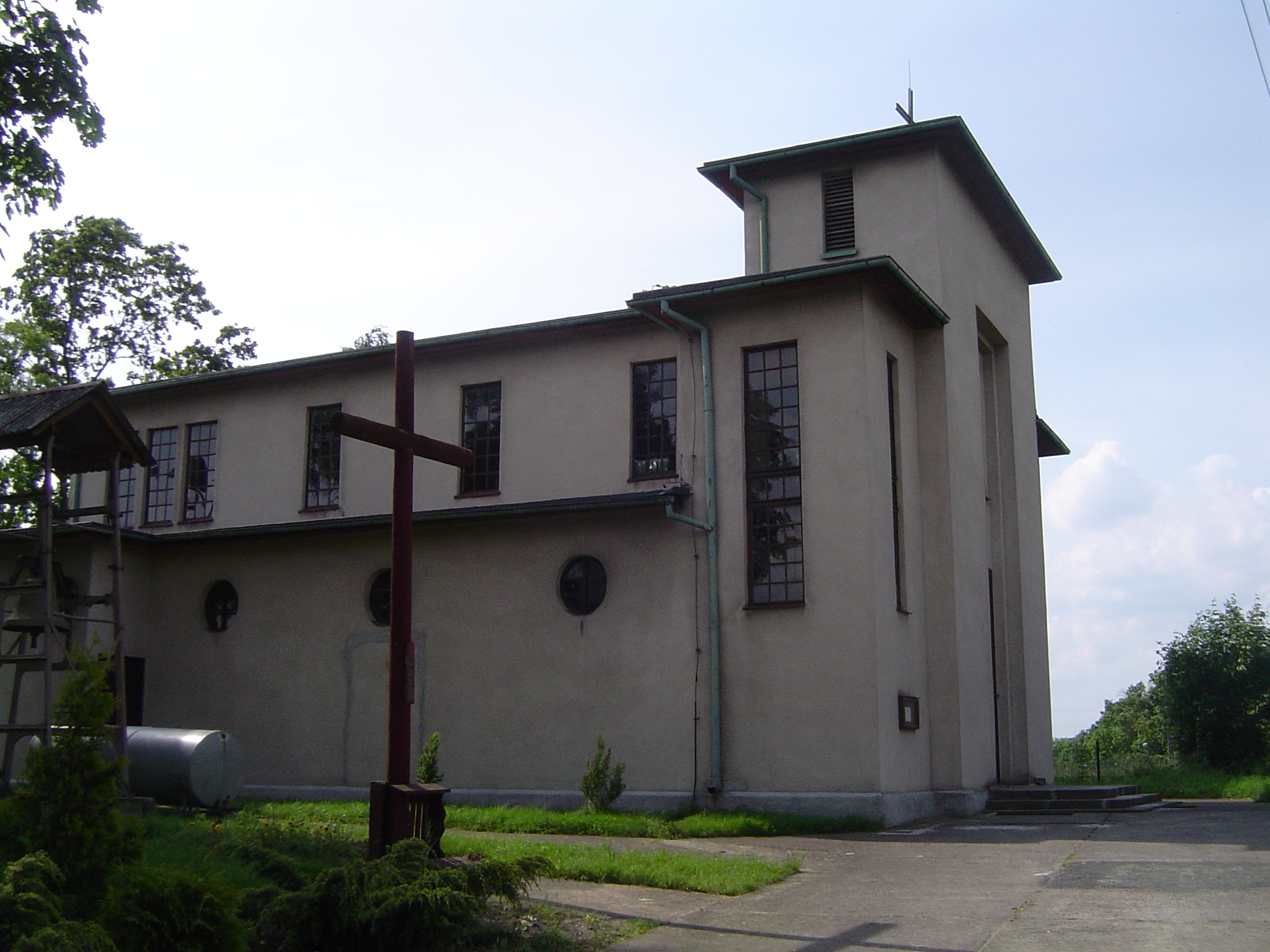
Church in Turznice

Turznice [tuʐˈnit͡sɛ] is a village in the administrative district of Gmina Grudziądz, within Grudziądz County, Kuyavian-Pomeranian Voivodeship, in north-central Poland.
