= Wielki Wełcz =

- Village
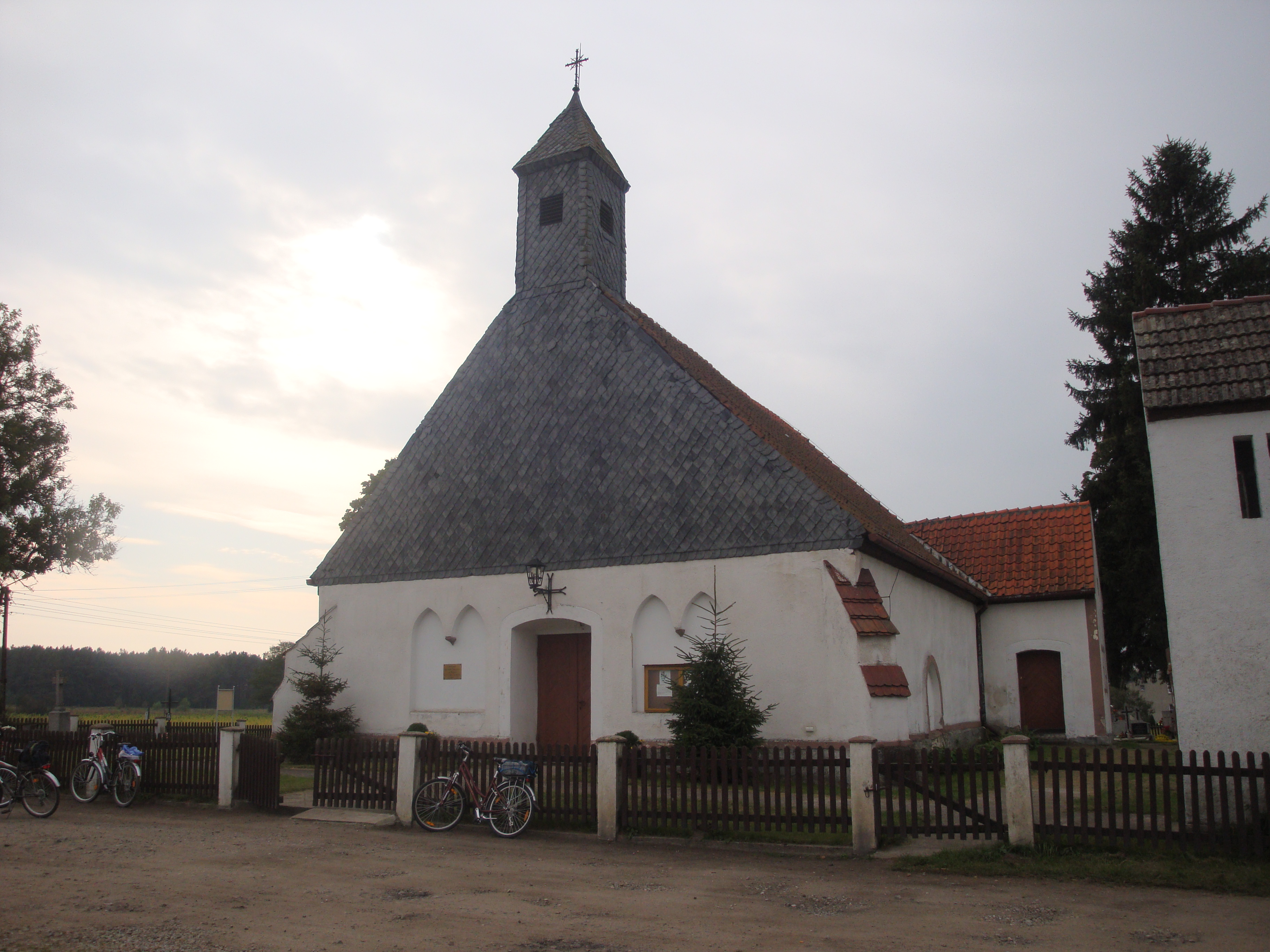
- Church of St. John the Baptist, built in 13th century

- Location within Poland
- Coordinates: 53°36′N 18°48′E
- Country: Poland
- Voivodeship: Kuyavian-Pomeranian
- County: Grudziądz
- Gmina: Grudziądz
- Time zone: UTC+1 (CET)
  - Summer (DST): UTC+2 (CEST)
- Vehicle registration: CGR

Wielki Wełcz (Polish pronunciation: [ˈvjɛlkʲi ˈvɛwtʂ]) is a village in the administrative district of Gmina Grudziądz, within Grudziądz County, Kuyavian-Pomeranian Voivodeship, in north-central Poland.

== History ==
Around 1560 Dutch Mennonites settled in the village, founding the first such community in the area. In 1604, starost of Grudziądz Maciej Konopacki leased 39 włókas of land to the Mennonites for 40 years, with the stipulation that after that time the Mennonites would have priority to buy the land outright. The village suffered in a flood in 1661.
