= Wałdowo Szlacheckie =

- Village
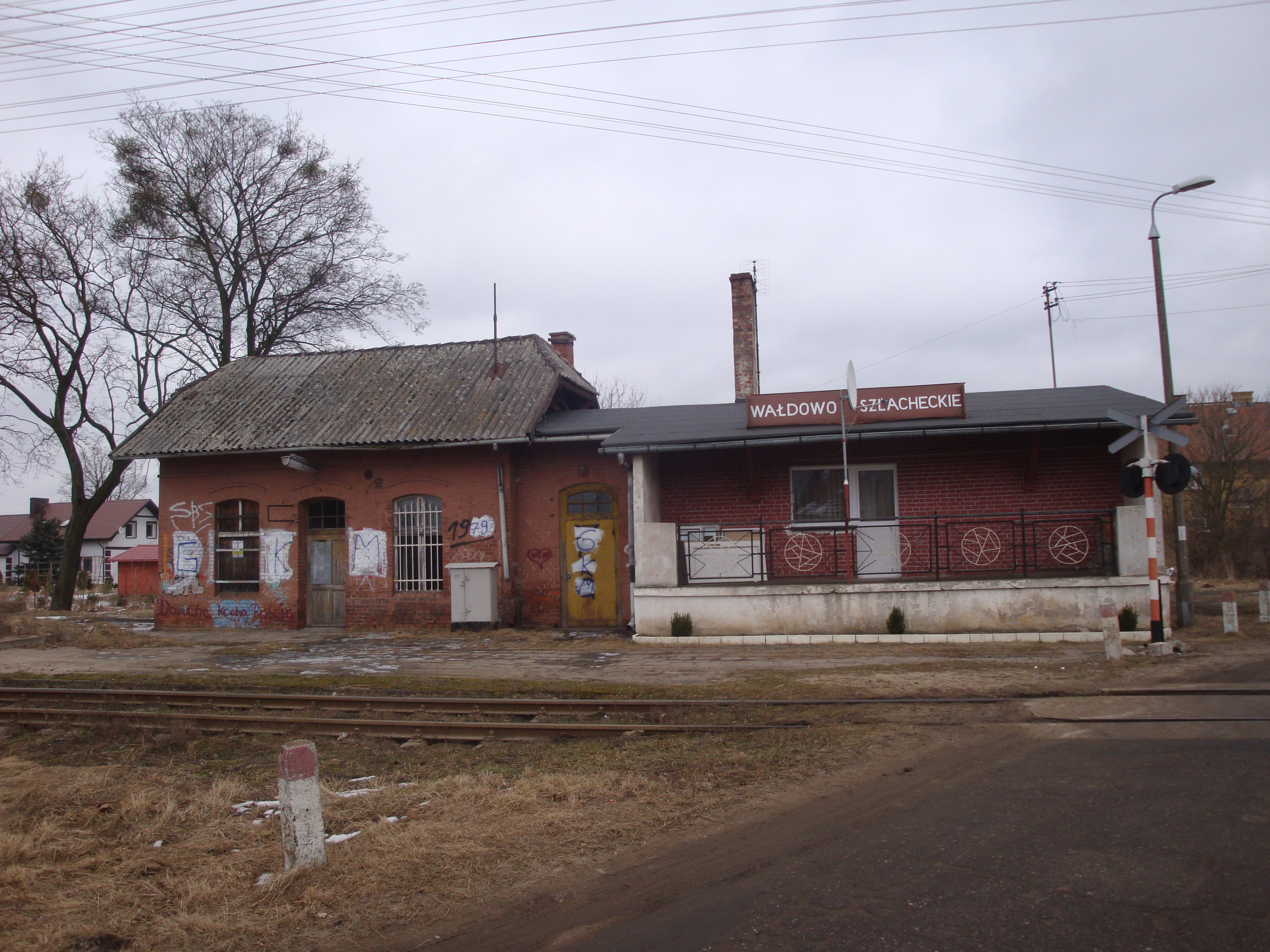
- Train station in Wałdowo Szlacheckie

- Location within Poland
- Coordinates: 53°23′N 18°44′E
- Country: Poland
- Voivodeship: Kuyavian-Pomeranian
- County: Grudziądz
- Gmina: Grudziądz
- Population: 652
- Time zone: UTC+1 (CET)
  - Summer (DST): UTC+2 (CEST)
- Vehicle registration: CGR

Wałdowo Szlacheckie [vau̯ˈdɔvɔ ʂlaˈxɛt͡skʲɛ] is a village in the administrative district of Gmina Grudziądz, within Grudziądz County, Kuyavian-Pomeranian Voivodeship, in north-central Poland.

== History ==
During the German occupation of Poland (World War II), Wałdowo Szlacheckie was one of the sites of executions of Poles, carried out by the Germans in 1939 as part of the Intelligenzaktion. In 1940, the occupiers also carried out expulsions of Poles, who were sent to a transit camp in Toruń and then deported to the General Government in the more eastern part of German-occupied Poland, while their houses and farms were handed over to German colonists as part of the Lebensraum policy.

== Transport ==
There is a train station in the village.
