= Big Brother (Polish TV series) season 7 =

Big Brother
- Season 7
- Presented by: Gabi Drzewiecka
- No. of days: 94
- No. of housemates: 23
- Winner: Kamil Lemieszewski
- Runner-up: Martyna Lewandowska
- Companion shows: Big Brother Nocą; Big Brother +; Big Brother Tydzień; Big Brother Live (Note: Big Brother - Pobudka (Big Brother - Wake Up: 9:50), Big Brother - Popołudnie (Big Brother - Afternoon: 14:25), Big Brother - Podwieczorek (Big Brother - Afternoon teatime 17:30)); on player.pl: Big Brother 18+; Big Brother News; Big Brother The best of; Big Brother After Show. Wywiady; Big Brother Star

Release
- Original network: TVN 7 TVN
- Original release: 13 September – 15 December 2019

Season chronology
- ← Previous; Season 6

Big Brother Polska 7 is the seventh season of the Polish reality television series Big Brother produced by EndemolShine Polska. The show returned only 3 months after season 6 ended. It premiered on September 13, 2019, on TVN 7 and finished on December 15, 2019.

Gabi Drzewiecka hosted the main show Big Brother Arena with Filip Chajzer. Sideshows include Big Brother Nocą Monday to Thursday after 23:00, Big Brother + a special live broadcast from the Big Brother House on Fridays after Big Brother Arena, and Big Brother Tydzień a summary of the past week on Sundays at 17:00 on TVN. There were also three short live broadcasts during the day. The show is also available on the internet streaming and video-on-demand service Player.

== Housemates ==
On 12 June 2019, three days before the finale of Big Brother 6, a housemate for Big Brother 7, Karolina Włodarska, entered the house as a guest. However, she did not appear at the premiere show, as one of the eighteen housemates to enter the house. On September 13 Karolina confirmed on social media that she would not be participating in Season 7 for personal reasons.

On 4 September 2019, it was revealed that on Saturday 7 September 2019, the public will begin voting between 3 candidates - Martyna Lewandowska, Wiktoria Józefiok, and Seweryn Sroka. Martyna Lewandowska was chosen by the public to become the official housemate.

Name	Age	Occupation	Residence	Day entered	Day exited	Status
Kamil Lemieszewski	36	Actor and stuntman	London	1	94	Winner
Martyna Lewandowska	21	Student	Żory	1	94	Runner-up
Wiktor Stadniczenko	28	Model	Wodnica	1	94	3rd Place
Sandra Mendelowska	20	Student	Krosno	66	87	Evicted
Malwina Ha	28	Karaoke bar owner	Pruszków	1	87	Evicted
Bartłomiej Czochara	34	Firefighter	Gdańsk	66	80	Ejected
Anna Izvarina	30	PR specialist	Warsaw	1	80	Evicted
Mateusz Sławiński	33	Sports analyst	Wrocław	1	73	Evicted
Ewa Kępys	28	Photographer and model	Warsaw	32	62	Walked
Vasileios "Vasilis" Tomazos	27	Leisure time animator	Myślenice	1	59	Evicted
Natalia Nienałtowska	23	Swimming instructor	Sydney/Warsaw	32	52	Evicted
Natalia Dawidowska	29	Courier and firefighter	Rumia	1	45	Evicted
Dawid Łojewski	29	Skiing instructor	Gdynia	1	42	Walked
Sarah Poznachowski	37	Housewife	Posada	1	38	Evicted
Katarzyna "Kasia" Strojek	35	Wedding planner; Gosia's twin sister	Kielce	1	34	Ejected
Łukasz Stawicki	37	Construction company owner	Płock	1	31	Evicted
Małgorzata "Gosia" Szmal	35	Wedding planner; Kasia's twin sister	Kielce	1	24	Evicted
Aleksandra Balawender	20	Student and barista	Rzeszów	1	21	Ejected
Karolina Sztafa	32	Club manager	Czechowice-Dziedzice	1	17	Evicted
Przemysław Karda	35	Businessman and former soldier	Sochaczew	1	8	Evicted
Not selected
Ewelina Puzio	22	Transport company owner	Stefanowo	66	66	Not selected
Seweryn Sroka	36	Physiotherapist and personal trainer	Gdynia	1	1	Not selected
Wiktoria Józefiok	19	High school graduate	Ruda Śląska	1	1	Not selected

== Nominations table ==
	Week 1		Week 2	Week 3	Week 4	Week 5	Week 6	Week 7	Week 8	Week 9	Week 10		Week 11	Week 12	Week 13 Final		Nominations received
	Day 1	Day 4	Week 2	Week 3	Week 4	Week 5	Week 6	Week 7	Week 8	Week 9	Intruder	Nominations	Week 11	Week 12	Week 13 Final		Nominations received
Kamil	Housemate	Karolina; Malwina	Gosia; Łukasz	Gosia; Kasia	Vasilis; Mateusz	Vasilis; Sarah	Malwina; Natalia D.	Vasilis; Natalia N.	Vasilis; Mateusz	Martyna; Malwina	Bartłomiej	Mateusz; Anna	Sandra; Martyna	Malwina; Sandra	Winner (Day 94)		39
Martyna	Potential Housemate	Karolina; Przemysław	Karolina; Kasia	Gosia; Natalia D.	Kasia (x2); Vasilis (x2)	Natalia D. Kasia	Vasilis; Natalia D.	Natalia N. Vasilis	Vasilis; Wiktor	Kamil; Mateusz	Bartłomiej	Malwina; Wiktor	Not; Eligible	Malwina; Kamil	Runner-up (Day 94)		24
Wiktor	Housemate	Łukasz; Aleksandra	Malwina; Natalia D.	Aleksandra; Kasia	Dawid; Martyna	Sarah; Kasia	Natalia D. Martyna	Ewa; Mateusz	Ewa; Martyna	Mateusz; Ewa	Bartłomiej	Anna; Martyna	Sandra; Martyna	Martyna; Sandra	Third Place (Day 94)		10
Sandra	Not in House										Nominated	Exempt	Kamil; Wiktor	Malwina; Kamil	Evicted (Day 87)		6
Malwina	Housemate	Martyna; Przemysław	Vasilis; Kasia	Gosia; Kasia	Kamil; Łukasz	Sarah; Kasia	Vasilis; Dawid	Ewa; Kamil	Ewa; Kamil	Ewa; Kamil	Bartłomiej	Martyna; Mateusz	Sandra; Martyna	Sandra; Kamil	Evicted (Day 87)		19
Bartłomiej	Not in House										Nominated	Exempt	Martyna; Kamil	Ejected (Day 80)			0
Anna	Housemate	Karolina; Aleksandra	Łukasz; Karolina	Aleksandra; Natalia D.	Dawid; Kamil	Sarah; Natalia D.	Natalia D. Dawid	Natalia N. Kamil	Kamil; Ewa	Kamil; Ewa	Bartłomiej	Kamil; Wiktor	Malwina; Wiktor	Evicted (Day 80)			7
Mateusz	Housemate	Karolina; Aleksandra	Karolina; Natalia D.	Gosia; Kamil	Łukasz; Kamil	Kamil; Martyna	Martyna; Natalia D.	Natalia N. Ewa	Ewa; Kamil	Kamil; Ewa	Bartłomiej	Malwina; Wiktor	Evicted (Day 73)				11
Ewelina	Not in House										Nominated	Evicted (Day 66)					0
Ewa	Not in House						Vasilis; Mateusz	Natalia N. Mateusz	Vasilis; Wiktor	Malwina; Anna	Walked (Day 62)						13
Vasilis	Housemate	Karolina; Malwina	Karolina; Malwina	Malwina; Aleksandra	Kamil (x2); Łukasz (x2)	Martyna; Kamil	Martyna; Malwina	Kamil; Natalia N.	Kamil; Ewa	Evicted (Day 59)							16
Natalia N.	Not in House						Vasilis; Anna	Kamil; Ewa	Evicted (Day 52)								6
Natalia D.	Housemate	Łukasz; Karolina	Łukasz; Karolina	Mateusz; Martyna	Łukasz; Kamil	Wiktor; Sarah	Mateusz; Anna	Evicted (Day 45)									13
Dawid	Housemate	Łukasz; Karolina	Gosia; Łukasz	Gosia; Martyna	Kamil; Anna	Kamil; Kasia	Wiktor; Martyna	Walked (Day 42)									4
Sarah	Housemate	Aleksandra; Malwina	Łukasz; Aleksandra	Kamil; Aleksandra	Łukasz; Kamil	Kamil; Kasia	Evicted (Day 38)										5
Kasia	Housemate	Karolina; Łukasz	Kamil; Łukasz	Kamil; Wiktor	Kamil; Łukasz	Kamil; Martyna	Ejected (Day 34)										16
Łukasz	Housemate	Martyna; Przemysław	Martyna; Kamil	Natalia D. Kasia	Kasia; Natalia D.	Evicted (Day 31)											17
Gosia	Housemate	Karolina; Malwina	Karolina; Malwina	Kamil; Malwina	Evicted (Day 24)												7
Aleksandra	Housemate	Przemysław; Martyna	Kasia; Vasilis	Anna; Kamil	Ejected (Day 21)												10
Karolina	Housemate	Przemysław; Martyna	Kasia; Vasilis	Evicted (Day 17)													16
Przemysław	Housemate	Karolina; Aleksandra	Evicted (Day 8)														5
Seweryn	Potential Housemate	Evicted (Day 1)															N/A
Wiktoria	Potential Housemate	Evicted (Day 1)															N/A
Note	1	2	3, 4	4, 5	6	7, 8, 9	10, 11	none	12	13	14	none	15, 16	17, 18, 19	none		
Up for eviction	Martyna; Seweryn; Wiktoria	Aleksandra; Przemysław	Anna; Karolina; Łukasz; Mateusz	Gosia; Kamil	Kamil; Łukasz	Anna; Kamil; ~~Kasia~~; Natalia D. Sarah	~~Dawid~~; Kamil; Martyna; Natalia D. Vasilis	Ewa; Kamil; Natalia N.	Ewa; Kamil; Martyna; Mateusz; Vasilis	~~Ewa~~; Kamil	Bartłomiej; Ewelina; Sandra	Anna; Malwina; Martyna; Mateusz; Wiktor	Anna; Martyna; Sandra	Kamil; Malwina; Sandra	Kamil; Martyna; Wiktor		
Up for eviction	Martyna; Seweryn; Wiktoria	Aleksandra; Przemysław	Anna; Karolina; Łukasz; Mateusz	Gosia; Kamil	Kamil; Łukasz	Anna; Kamil; ~~Kasia~~; Natalia D. Sarah	~~Dawid~~; Kamil; Martyna; Natalia D. Vasilis	Ewa; Kamil; Natalia N.	Ewa; Kamil; Martyna; Mateusz; Vasilis	~~Ewa~~; Kamil	Bartłomiej; Ewelina; Sandra	Anna; Malwina; Martyna; Mateusz; Wiktor	Anna; Martyna; Sandra	Sandra	Kamil; Martyna; Wiktor		
Walked	none						Dawid	none		Ewa	none						
Ejected	none			Aleksandra	none	Kasia	none							Bartłomiej	none		
Evicted	Seweryn; Fewest votes to be a housemate	Przemysław; 57% to evict	Karolina; 67% Łukasz's choice to evict	Gosia; 56% to evict	Łukasz; 57% to evict	Sarah; 39% to evict	Natalia D. 49% to evict	Natalia N. 52% to evict	Vasilis; 51% to evict	Eviction cancelled	Bartłomiej; Housemates' choice to be a housemate	Mateusz; Most votes to evict	Anna; 67% to evict	Malwina; 52% to evict	Wiktor; Fewest votes to win	Martyna; Fewest votes to win	
Evicted	Seweryn; Fewest votes to be a housemate	Przemysław; 57% to evict	Karolina; 67% Łukasz's choice to evict	Gosia; 56% to evict	Łukasz; 57% to evict	Sarah; 39% to evict	Natalia D. 49% to evict	Natalia N. 52% to evict	Vasilis; 51% to evict	Eviction cancelled	Sandra; Most votes to be a housemate	Mateusz; Most votes to evict	Anna; 67% to evict	Malwina; 52% to evict	Wiktor; Fewest votes to win	Martyna; Fewest votes to win	
Evicted	Wiktoria; Fewest votes to be a housemate	Przemysław; 57% to evict	Karolina; 67% Łukasz's choice to evict	Gosia; 56% to evict	Łukasz; 57% to evict	Sarah; 39% to evict	Natalia D. 49% to evict	Natalia N. 52% to evict	Vasilis; 51% to evict	Eviction cancelled	Sandra; Most votes to be a housemate	Mateusz; Most votes to evict	Wiktor; 56% to be finalist	Sandra; 70% to evict	Kamil; Most votes to win		
Evicted	Wiktoria; Fewest votes to be a housemate	Przemysław; 57% to evict	Karolina; 67% Łukasz's choice to evict	Gosia; 56% to evict	Łukasz; 57% to evict	Sarah; 39% to evict	Natalia D. 49% to evict	Natalia N. 52% to evict	Vasilis; 51% to evict	Eviction cancelled	Ewelina; Fewest votes to be a housemate	Mateusz; Most votes to evict	Wiktor; 56% to be finalist	Sandra; 70% to evict	Kamil; Most votes to win		

=== Notes ===
This housemate was given or won immunity and could not be nominated for eviction for that week.
This housemate was automatically put up for eviction by Big Brother.

- ^Note 1 : On 7 September 2019, a public vote started between 3 potential housemates - Martyna Lewandowska, Wiktoria Józefiok, and Seweryn Sroka. During the premiere show, it was announced Martyna Lewandowska received the most votes, therefore becoming the official housemate.
- ^Note 2 : On Day 4, Karolina was originally nominated. After nominations, Mateusz broke the rules by talking about nominations. After being questioned by "Big Brother", he had to indicate a person (from his nomination) he wanted to evict. That person was Karolina. As a result of Mateusz's action, Karolina was granted immunity and therefore saved from nomination.
- ^Note 3 : Anna was automatically nominated for eviction as punishment for placing last in the week's task. Mateusz was the winner of the same task and he was granted immunity. However, on Day 10 Mateusz was automatically nominated for eviction as punishment for his inappropriate behaviour towards Malwina during a party the night before.
- ^Note 4 : During the live show on Day 17 after the public vote ended, it was revealed that Karolina received 67% of votes to evict and Łukasz received 18% of votes to evict. Łukasz was given a choice by the Big Brother: he could either evict Karolina or leave the house himself. He chose to evict Karolina. Łukasz was given immunity and could not be nominated for eviction.
- ^Note 5 : On Day 21, Aleksandra was ejected from the Big Brother house for breaking the rules by requesting viewers vote to evict Kamil.
- ^Note 6 : Martyna and Vasilis won the week's task and as a reward, their votes during nominations counted double. Sarah was granted immunity for completing a task.
- ^Note 7 : Łukasz had to choose three housemates to be evaluated by viewers. He picked Anna, Dawid, and Mateusz. Anna received the most negative comments and was automatically nominated. Mateusz received the most positive comments and was granted immunity.
- ^Note 8 : Natalia D. was automatically nominated after losing a challenge.
- ^Note 9 : On Day 34 Kasia was ejected from the Big Brother house for constantly disobeying Big Brother.
- ^Note 10 : Kamil was chosen to be automatically nominated by several housemates as part of a task the previous week.
- ^Note 11 : As punishment for aggressive behaviour between Dawid, Kamil and Vasilis, there was online voting on Facebook. Dawid received the most votes and was automatically nominated for eviction. However, later that day it was announced that Dawid decided to leave the house.
- ^Note 12 : On Day 53 Martyna, Mateusz and Vasilis were automatically nominated for eviction for not completing tasks, disobeying and undermining the authority of the Big Brother.
- ^Note 13 : After Ewa left the house on Day 62, the eviction vote between her and Kamil was cancelled.
- ^Note 14 : On Day 66 three new potential housemates were introduced: Bartłomiej, Ewelina and Sandra. However, only two of them became official housemates. Bartłomiej was chosen by the six remaining housemates, while Sandra received more votes than Ewelina during voting on Facebook.
- ^Note 15 : Anna was chosen to be automatically nominated by the viewers during voting on Instagram.
- ^Note 16 : All housemates had to fight for the right to nominate. Martyna failed to complete a task and lost the right to nominate.
- ^Note 17 : Wiktor received a "Golden Ticket" from the viewers during voting on Instagram and automatically advanced to the final.
- ^Note 18 : On Day 80 Bartłomiej was ejected for discussing nominations.
- ^Note 19 : During the week, former housemates were asked which of the remaining housemates least deserved to be in the final. They chose Sandra. Then the viewers on Instagram were asked "Should Sandra be in the final?" and 70% voted "NO", therefore Sandra was evicted.

== Ratings ==
Official ratings are taken from Nielsen Audience Measurement.

	Week 1		Week 2	Week 3	Week 4	Week 5	Week 6	Week 7	Week 8	Week 9	Week 10	Week 11	Week 12	Week 13
Monday	-	286,352	347,202	415,210	572,704	486,798	372,258	454,584	497,547	523,809	636,164	493,493	489,628	517,272
Tuesday	-	447,425	318,567	361,519	375,837	440,266	454,584	454,584	490,378	464,488	473,696	497,884	482,088	526,355
Wednesday	-	483,219	390,155	347,202	497,537	436,687	504,695	429,528	429,618	442,089	572,992	497,464	520,469	489,408
Thursday	-	400,893	529,751	451,004	468,901	458,163	526,172	451,004	523,147	541,006	486,601	455,226	482,004	392,315
Friday	508,275	340,043	504,695	340,043	393,734	454,584	519,013	590,601	462,724	479,569	391,960	463,292	436,727	489,216
Saturday	261,296	318,567	221,923	422,369	336,464	354,361	343,622	347,202	381,250	403,244	420,628	357,984	340,171	440,150
Sunday	465,322	479,640	554,807	791,047	515,434	680,086	687,245	655,030	593,778	829,465	681,283	736,720	764,890	1,057,401
Weekly average	399,103		409,586	446,913	451,516	375,831	486,798	438,579	482,635	526,239	523,332	500,295	502,282	558,874
Season average	493,747													
