= Big Brother (Polish TV series) season 5 =

Big Brother
- Season 5
- Presented by: Kuba Klawiter; Małgorzata Kosik
- No. of days: 92
- No. of housemates: 27
- Winners: Jarosław Jakimowicz; Janusz Strączek
- Runners-up: Jolanta Rutowicz; Klaudia Olczak
- Companion shows: Big Brother - Extra; Big Brother – Omnibus; Big Brother – Prosto z Domu

Release
- Original network: TV4
- Original release: 2 March – 1 June 2008

Season chronology
- ← Previous; Season 4 Next → Season 6

Big Brother 5 is the fifth season of the Polish reality television series Big Brother. The show followed a number of contestants, known as housemates, who are isolated from the outside world for an extended period of time in a custom-built house. Each week, one of the housemates is evicted by a public vote, with the last housemate remaining winning a cash prize.

The Big Brother 5 was divided into two parts: the first part is the one with celebrity (VIP) housemates and the second part is the one with civilian housemates. The show part one kicked off on 2 March 2008, where nine celebrity housemates entered the house. On 30 March 2008, two potential housemates for the civilian edition of Big Brother 5 entered the house, marked as the second part kicked off. The celebrity edition is still taking place in the house and the launch of the civilian edition marks the first time in the world of Big Brother history that a country has two editions running at the same time.

The first part lasted 36 days, the final was on 6 April 2008, Jarosław "Jarek" Jakimowicz walked out as the winner. The prize for him is two watches with a total value of 50,000 PLN. The second part lasted 64 days, on 1 June 2008, the final of the second part and the Big Brother 5, Janusz Strączek declared as the winner of the second part. The prize for him is 50,000 PLN and a Motorcycle - David Harley. The whole Big Brother 5 lasted 92 days in total.

Kuba Klawiter hosts the main show Big Brother - Ring with Małgorzata Kosik. Sideshows include Big Brother – Prosto z Domu Monday to Friday 18:00, a 30-minute live stream, viewers will be able to watch live how housemates deal with the special tasks set by Big Brother. Big Brother - Extra, a show for adult viewers: new, not broadcast in the live stream show at 18:30 or in recaps shows, reports from the Big Brother House. Big Brother – Omnibus, a summary of the past week on Sundays at 18:00.

== Part 1: VIP ==
Nine celebrity housemates entered the house on Day 1, March 2, 2008. And on Day 8, March 9, 2008, two celebrity housemates entered the house.

Big Brother
- Season 5
- No. of days: 36
- No. of housemates: 11
- Winner: Jarosław Jakimowicz
- Runner-up: Jolanta Rutowicz

Release
- Original release: 2 March – 6 April 2008

Season chronology
- ← Previous; Season 4 Next → Big Brother 5: Part 2

=== Housemates ===
Housemate	Age	Famous for...	Residence
Albert Sosnowski	28	Boxer	Warsaw
Anzhela Koltsova	34	Actress	Moscow
Jarosław "Jarek" Jakimowicz	38	Actor	Warsaw
Jolanta "Jola" Rutowicz	24	Big Brother 4.1 Winner	Piotrków Trybunalski
Katarzyna "Kasia" Brodowska	25	Singer	Łódź
Marcin Miller	37	Singer	Ełk
Marcin Najman	28	Boxer	Częstochowa
Michał Skawiński	27	Taniec z Gwiazdami Professional Dancer	Wrocław
Monika Goździalska	27	Big Brother 3 Housemate	Falborek
Piotr Gulczyński	39	Big Brother 1 Housemate, Bar 4 Contestant	Poznań
Aleksandra "Sasha" Strunin	18	Singer, The Jet Set member	Poznań

=== Nominations table ===
	Week 1	Week 2	Week 3		Week 4	Week 5					Final Day 36	
	Week 1	Week 2	Day 17	Day 18	Week 4	Day 31	Day 32	Day 33	Day 34	Day 35	Final Day 36	
Jarek	Sasha, Piotr	No; Nominations	No; Nominations	Marcin, Piotr	Michał, Piotr	Krystian	No; Nominations	Monika	Finalist		Winner (Day 36)	
Jola	Albert, Piotr	No; Nominations	Nominated	Sasha, Marcin N.	Sasha, Piotr	Krystian	No; Nominations	Dorota	No; Nominations	Finalist	Runner-Up (Day 36)	
Anzhela	Kasia, Piotr	No; Nominations	No; Nominations	Marcin N., Piotr	Jarek, Jola	Krystian	No; Nominations	Monika	No; Nominations	No; Nominations	Third place (Day 36)	
Michał	Not in House	No; Nominations	No; Nominations	Marcin N., Jarek	Jarek, Jola	Krystian	No; Nominations	Monika	No; Nominations	No; Nominations	Evicted (Day 35)	
Sasha	Kasia, Marcin M.	No; Nominations	No; Nominations	Jarek, Jola	Jarek, Jola	Walked (Day 30)						
Piotr	Jarek, Kasia	No; Nominations	No; Nominations	Jarek, Marcin N.	Jarek, Jola	Evicted (Day 29)						
Marcin N.	Kasia, Marcin M.	No; Nominations	No; Nominations	Jarek, Michał	Evicted (Day 22)							
Marcin M.	Albert, Marcin N.	No; Nominations	No; Nominations	Walked (Day 20)								
Monika	Not in House	No; Nominations	No; Nominations	Walked (Day 18)								
Albert	Jola, Kasia	No; Nominations	Evicted (Day 15)									
Kasia	Anna, Sebastian	Evicted (Day 8)										
Notes	1	none	2	none	none	4	3	5	3		none	
Nominated	All housemates	All housemates	Jola	Jarek; Marcin N.	Jarek; Jola; Piotr	none	Anzhela; Jarek; Jola; Michał	none	Anzhela; Jola; Michał	Anzhela; Michał	Anzhela; Jarek; Jola	
Walked	none			Monika, Marcin M.	none		Sasha	none				
Evicted	Kasia; 2.60% to evict	Albert; 6.80% to evict	Jola; 52.60% to save	Marcin N. 8.10% to evict	Piotr -1.60% to save	none	Jarek -15.60% to save	none	Jola -12.50% to save	Michał -7.80% to save	Anzhela; 9.93% to win	Jola; 45.81% to win
Evicted	Kasia; 2.60% to evict	Albert; 6.80% to evict	Jola; 52.60% to save	Marcin N. 8.10% to evict	Piotr -1.60% to save	none	Jarek -15.60% to save	none	Jola -12.50% to save	Michał -7.80% to save	Jarek; 46.39% to win	

==== Notes ====
- ^1 On Day 4, housemates nominated for the first time. But this round of nominations was fake and all housemates were put up for eviction.
- ^2 Jola was automatically nominated for eviction as she came second in the eviction vote on Sunday. The public voted for whether she should be evicted or stay.
- ^3 On Day 30, Anzhela, Jarek, Jola and Michał have been automatically nominated for eviction. Over the next few days, three votes will take place that will decide the three finalists and at the end of the third vote who will be the last housemate evicted.

== Part 2: civilian ==
The civilian part started on Day 29, March 30, 2008, when two male potential housemates: Janusz and Krystian entered the secret room inside the house. The four remaining VIP housemates will choose one of them became the official housemate. On April 1, Janusz became the first official housemate, after Krystian after received all 4 evict votes. Later that day, two female potential housemates: Dorota and Monika entered the house. The four remaining VIP housemates and Janusz will choose one of them became the official housemate. On April 3, Monika became the second official housemate, for received four save votes. Dorota was evicted for only received one save vote.

Big Brother
- Season 5
- No. of days: 64
- No. of housemates: 16
- Winner: Janusz Strączek
- Runner-up: Klaudia Olczak

Release
- Original release: 30 March – 1 June 2008

Season chronology
- ← Previous; Big Brother 5: Part 1 Next → Season 6

=== Housemates ===
Housemate	Age	Residence
Angelika Frybezowska	23	Police
Anna Wódkiewicz	37	Dzierżoniów
Daniela Świtalska	25	Katowice
Dariusz Kiśluk	22	Kraków
Dawid Choma	19	Wrocław
Diana Hoffmann	26	Poznań
Dorota		
Iza Potęga	22	Łódź
Janusz Strączek	27	Ząb/Zakopane
Józef Warchoł	44	Koszalin
Klaudia Olczak	23	Warsaw
Krystian Gutowski	28	
Magda Kitaszewska	22	Chełm
Marcin Kaliszek	24	Skierniewice
Monika Olszanowska	30	Zgorzelec
Niccolaus Prusiński	25	Berlin
Paweł Kryszczuk	21	Stargard Szczeciński
Sylwia Skarbińska	23	Szczecin

=== Nominations table ===
	Week 5		Week 6	Week 7	Week 8	Week 9	Week 10	Week 11	Week 12	Week 13				
	Day 31	Day 33	Week 6	Week 7	Week 8	Week 9	Week 10	Week 11	Week 12	Day 87	Day 89	Day 91	Final Day 92	
Janusz	Nominated	Monika	Iza; Klaudia	Iza; Pawel	Klaudia; Pawel	Nominated	Dawid; Iza; Diana	Angelika; Dawid; Klaudia	Dawid; Klaudia; Niccolaus	No; Nominations	No; Nominations	No; Nominations	Winner (Day 92)	
Klaudia	Not in House		Daniela; Sylwia	Daniela; Dariusz	Daniela; Iza	Iza; Magda	Dawid; Magda; Marcin	Angelika; Magda; Sylwia	Janusz; Niccolaus; Sylwia	No; Nominations	No; Nominations	No; Nominations	Runner-up (Day 92)	
Dawid	Not in House					Niccolaus; Janusz	Iza; Klaudia; Diana	Angelika; Magda; Niccolaus	Janusz; Niccolaus; Sylwia	No; Nominations	No; Nominations	No; Nominations	Third place (Day 92)	
Magda	Not in House		Iza; Klaudia	Pawel; Klaudia	Klaudia; Pawel	Klaudia; Dawid	Klaudia; Iza; Dawid	Angelika; Dawid; Klaudia	Dawid; Klaudia; Niccolaus	No; Nominations	No; Nominations	No; Nominations	Evicted (Day 91)	
Anna	Not in House									No; Nominations	No; Nominations	Evicted (Day 89)		
Sylwia	Not in House		Iza; Klaudia	Klaudia; Dariusz	Klaudia; Pawel	Nominated	Iza; Klaudia; Dawid	Angelika; Klaudia; Niccolaus	Dawid; Klaudia; Niccolaus	No; Nominations	Evicted (Day 87)			
Niccolaus	Not in House		Iza; Jozef	Iza; Klaudia	Klaudia; Pawel	Iza; Dawid	Iza; Dawid; Marcin	Dawid; Marcin; Sylwia	Dawid; Klaudia; Sylwia	Evicted (Day 85)				
Marcin	Not in House		Iza; Monika	Klaudia; Dariusz	Iza; Pawel	Iza; Dawid	Iza; Klaudia; Diana	Angelika; Klaudia; Niccolaus	Ejected (Day 80)					
Angelika	Not in House		Iza; Klaudia	Pawek; Klaudia	Iza; Klaudia	Klaudia; Magda	Iza; Klaudia; Janusz	Dawid; Klaudia; Magda	Evicted (Day 78)					
Iza	Not in House		Dariusz; Klaudia	Dariusz; Klaudia	Klaudia; Pawel	Klaudia; Marcin	Marcin; Magda; Angelika	Evicted (Day 71)						
Diana	Not in House					Iza; Janusz	Iza; Klaudia; Janusz	Evicted (Day 71)						
Daniela	Not in House		Jozef; Klaudia	Klaudia; Dariusz	Klaudia; Pawel	Iza; Diana	Evicted (Day 64)							
Pawel	Not in House			Angelika; Dariusz	Iza; Sylwia	Evicted (Day 57)								
Dariusz	Not in House		Iza; Klaudia	Iza; Klaudia	Evicted (Day 50)									
Monika	Not in House	Nominated	Angelika; Klaudia	Walked (Day 41)										
Jozef	Not in House		Angelika; Klaudia	Ejected (Day 41)										
Dorota	Not in House	Nominated	Evicted (Day 33)											
Krystian	Nominated	Evicted (Day 31)												
Notes	4	5	6, 7	none	none	8, 9, 10	11	none	12	13				
Up for eviction	Janusz; Krystian	Dorota; Monika	Iza; Jozef; Klaudia	Dariusz; Klaudia	Klaudia; Pawel	Daniela; Dawid; Iza; Janusz; Klaudia; Marcin; Sylwia	Dawid; Diana; Iza; Klaudia	Angelika; Klaudia	Dawid; Klaudia; Niccolaus	All housemates				
Up for eviction	Janusz; Krystian	Dorota; Monika	Iza; Jozef; Klaudia	Dariusz; Klaudia	Klaudia; Pawel	Daniela; Dawid; Iza; Janusz; Klaudia; Marcin; Sylwia	Dawid; Iza; Klaudia	Angelika; Klaudia	Dawid; Klaudia; Niccolaus	All housemates				
Walked	none		Monika	none										
Ejected	none		Jozef	none					Marcin	none				
Evicted	Krystian; 4 of 4 vote to evict	Dorota; 1 of 5 vote to save	Eviction cancelled	Dariusz; 2.6% to evict	Pawel; 7% to evict	Daniela; 7.2% to evict	Diana; 6% to evict	Angelika; 2.4% to evict	Niccolaus; 4.6% to evict	Sylwia; 12.3% (out of 6) to evict	Anna; 4.7% (out of 5) to evict	Magda; 5.9% (out of 4) to evict	Dawid; 12.80% to win	Klaudia; 42.60% to win
Evicted	Krystian; 4 of 4 vote to evict	Dorota; 1 of 5 vote to save	Eviction cancelled	Dariusz; 2.6% to evict	Pawel; 7% to evict	Daniela; 7.2% to evict	Iza; 3.9% to evict	Angelika; 2.4% to evict	Niccolaus; 4.6% to evict	Sylwia; 12.3% (out of 6) to evict	Anna; 4.7% (out of 5) to evict	Magda; 5.9% (out of 4) to evict	Janusz; 44.60% to win	

==== Notes ====
- ^4 On Sunday 30 March, Janusz and Krystian entered the Secret Room. They were automatically nominated for eviction. On Tuesday 1 April, the 4 remaining Big Brother VIP housemates had to choose to evict one of them. Krystian was evicted after received all 4 evict votes from Anzhela, Jarek, Jola and Michał. Janusz became the first official housemate of Big Brother 5.
- ^5 On Tuesday 1 April, Dorota and Monika entered the Secret Room. They were automatically nominated for eviction. On Thursday 3 April, the 4 remaining Big Brother VIP housemates and Janusz will decide which of them will stay in the Big Brother House. Monika became the second official housemate of Big Brother 5 after received 4 save votes from Anzhela, Michał, Janusz and Jarek. Dorota was evicted.
- ^6 Jozef was nominated by Big Brother for rule-breaking.
- ^7 Jozef was ejected from the Big Brother house because he assaulted Dariusz and Janusz. Following the incident, Monike voluntarily left the house. Because of this, the eviction was cancelled.
- ^8 Daniela was automatically nominated by Big Brother before the nominations and so she could not be nominated by the other Housemates. She was nominated as a punishment for revealing information to her boyfriend.
- ^9 Janusz & Sylwia refused to nominate as they wanted to leave the house. They were automatically nominated by Big Brother as punishment.
- ^10 Marcin was automatically nominated by Big Brother after nominations had taken place. He was nominated as he came last in the weekly task.
- ^11 Diana was automatically nominated by Big Brother after the nominations as punishment for sending messages to the outside world.
- ^12 Magda won immunity during a task.
- ^13 The public are now voting for a winner. They will vote positively (to win) or negatively (to not win) with the housemate with the lowest net win votes being evicted.
