= Gogolin, Grudziądz County =

Gogolin
- Village
- Location within Poland
- Coordinates: 53°24′N 18°40′E
- Country: Poland
- Voivodeship: Kuyavian-Pomeranian
- County: Grudziądz
- Gmina: Grudziądz

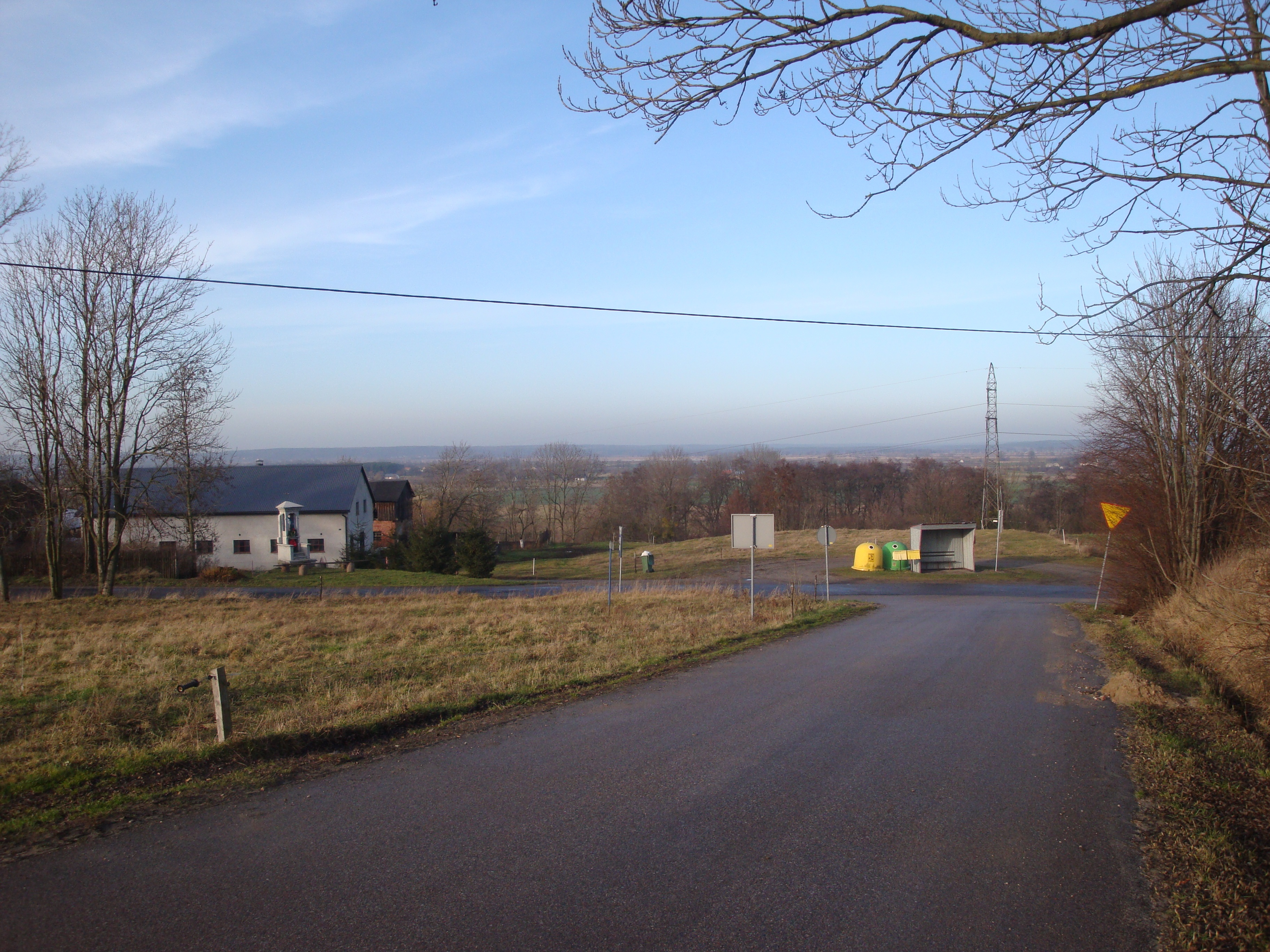
Bus stop and shrine in Gogolin

Gogolin [ɡɔˈɡɔlin] is a village in the administrative district of Gmina Grudziądz, within Grudziądz County, Kuyavian-Pomeranian Voivodeship, in north-central Poland.
