= Świerkocin, Kuyavian-Pomeranian Voivodeship =

Świerkocin
- Village
- Location within Poland
- Coordinates: 53°31′58″N 18°49′12″E
- Country: Poland
- Voivodeship: Kuyavian-Pomeranian
- County: Grudziądz
- Gmina: Grudziądz
- Time zone: UTC+1 (CET)
  - Summer (DST): UTC+2 (CEST)
- Vehicle registration: CGR

Świerkocin (Polish: [ɕfjɛrˈkɔt͡ɕin]; German: Tannenrode) is a village in the administrative district of Gmina Grudziądz, within Grudziądz County, Kuyavian-Pomeranian Voivodeship, in north-central Poland.

== History ==
During the German occupation of Poland (World War II), Świerkocin was one of the sites of executions of Poles, carried out by the Germans in 1939 as part of the Intelligenzaktion.
