= Stary Folwark, Kuyavian-Pomeranian Voivodeship =

Stary Folwark
- Village
- Location within Poland
- Coordinates: 53°26′N 18°52′E
- Country: Poland
- Voivodeship: Kuyavian-Pomeranian
- County: Grudziądz
- Gmina: Grudziądz

Stary Folwark [ˈstarɨ ˈfɔlvark] is a village in the administrative district of Gmina Grudziądz, within Grudziądz County, Kuyavian-Pomeranian Voivodeship, in north-central Poland.
