= Biały Bór, Kuyavian-Pomeranian Voivodeship =

Biały Bór
- Village
- Location within Poland
- Coordinates: 53°23′45″N 18°44′19″E
- Country: Poland
- Voivodeship: Kuyavian-Pomeranian
- County: Grudziądz
- Gmina: Grudziądz
- Population: 650
- Time zone: UTC+1 (CET)
  - Summer (DST): UTC+2 (CEST)
- Vehicle registration: CGR

Biały Bór (Polish: [ˈbjawɨ ˈbur]) is a village in the administrative district of Gmina Grudziądz, within Grudziądz County, Kuyavian-Pomeranian Voivodeship, in north-central Poland. It is located in Chełmno Land within the historic region of Pomerania.

== History ==
During the German occupation of Poland (World War II), Biały Bór was one of the sites of executions of Poles, carried out by the Germans in 1939 as part of the Intelligenzaktion.
