= Solar eclipse of March 29, 2025 =

Partial solar eclipse

- Partial eclipse
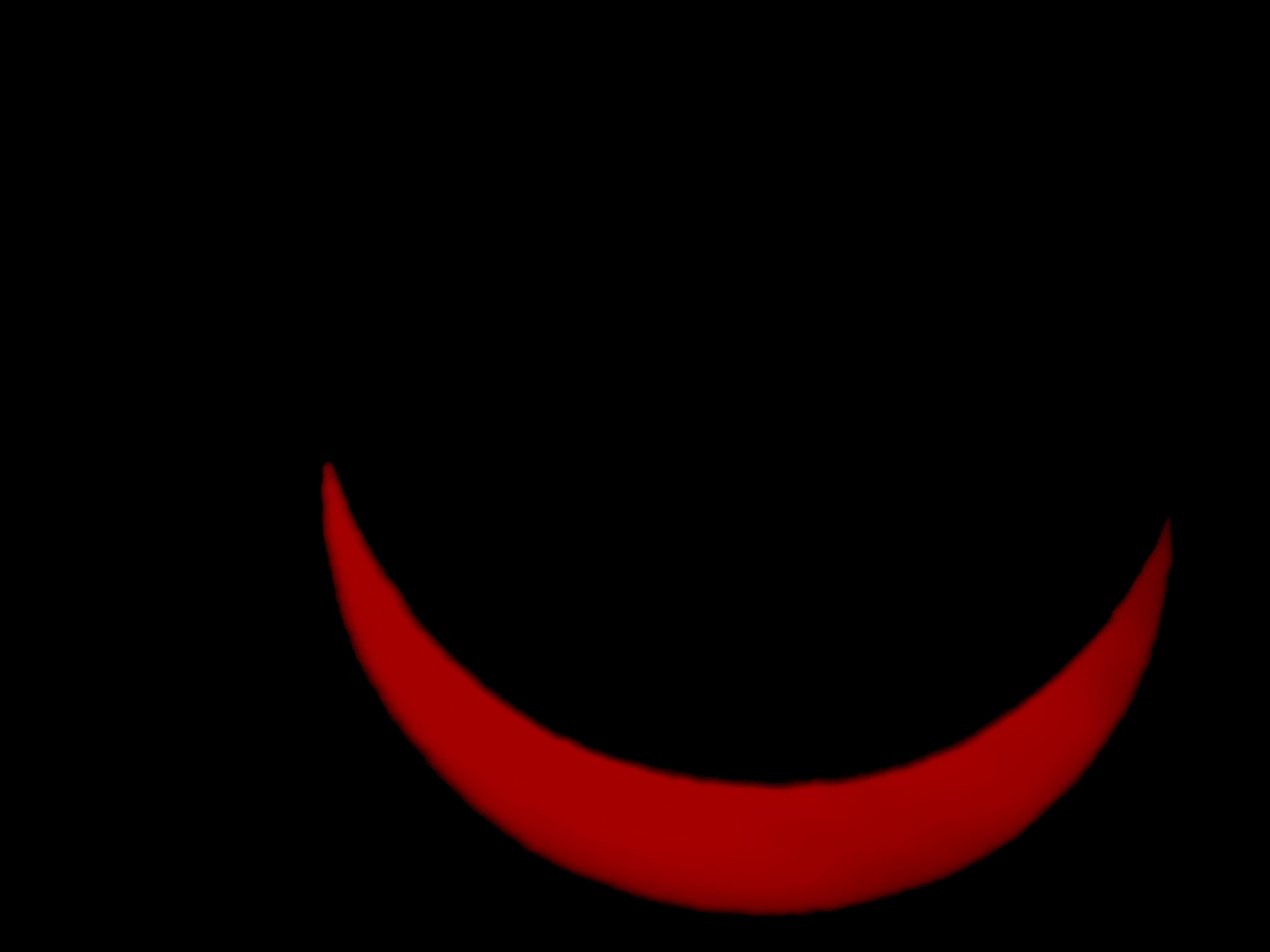
- Partial from Halifax, Canada, shortly after maximum

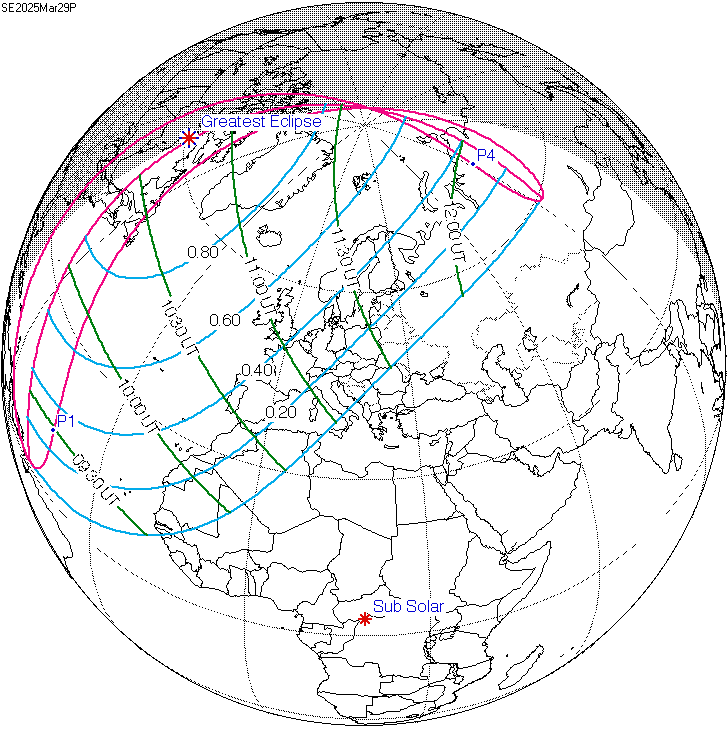
- Map
- Gamma: 1.0405
- Magnitude: 0.9376

Maximum eclipse
- Coordinates: 61.1°N 77.1°W

Times (UTC)
- Greatest eclipse: 10:48:36

References
- Saros: 149 (21 of 71)
- Catalog # (SE5000): 9563

A partial solar eclipse occurred at the Moon’s ascending node of orbit on March 29, 2025, with a magnitude of 0.9376. A solar eclipse occurs when the Moon passes between Earth and the Sun, thereby totally or partly obscuring the image of the Sun for a viewer on Earth. A partial solar eclipse occurs in the polar regions of the Earth when the center of the Moon's shadow misses the Earth.

The partial eclipse was visible for parts of the northeastern United States, eastern Canada, Greenland, Europe, northwest Africa, and northwestern Russia.

== Images ==
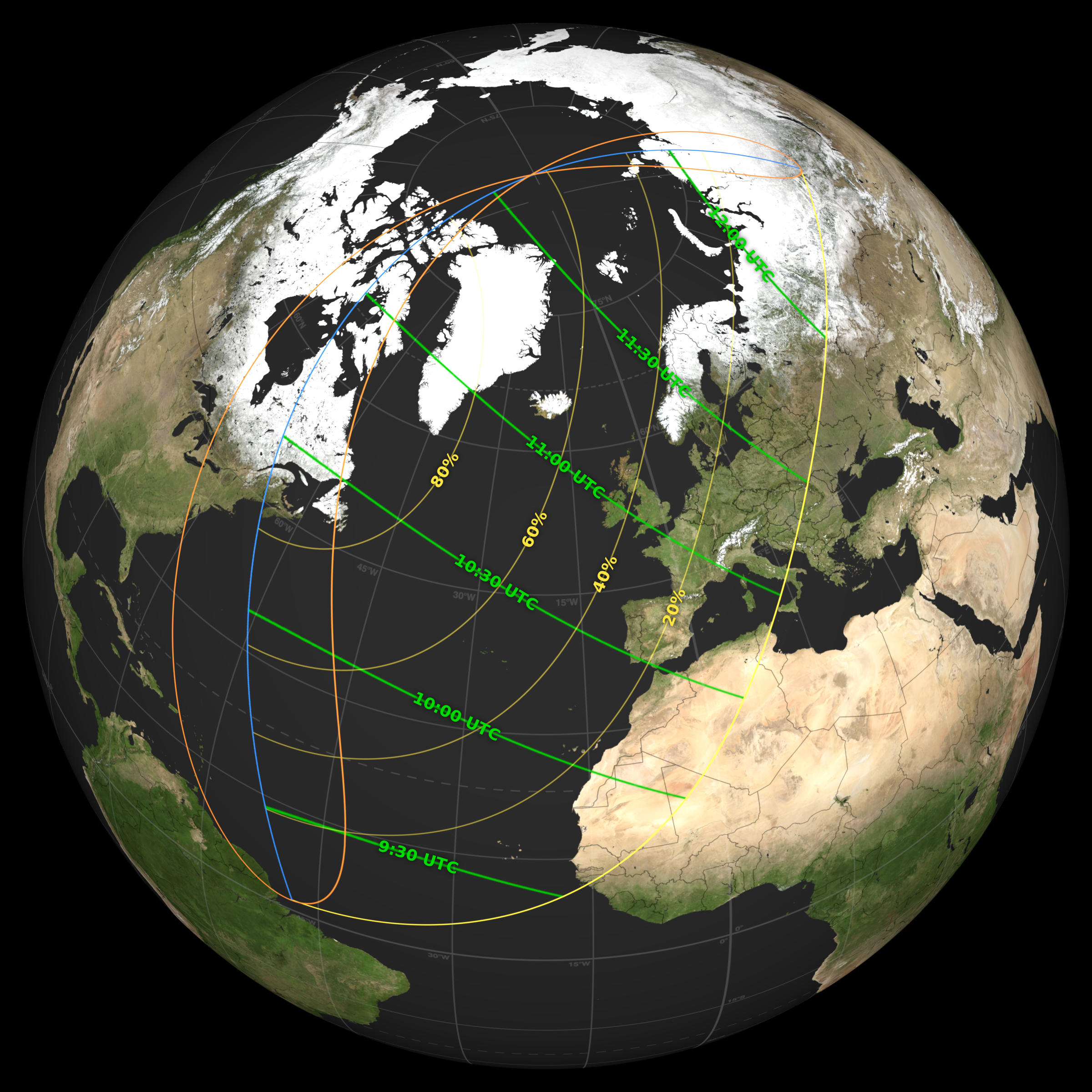
Image credit: NASA's Scientific Visualization Studio

Animated path

== Gallery ==
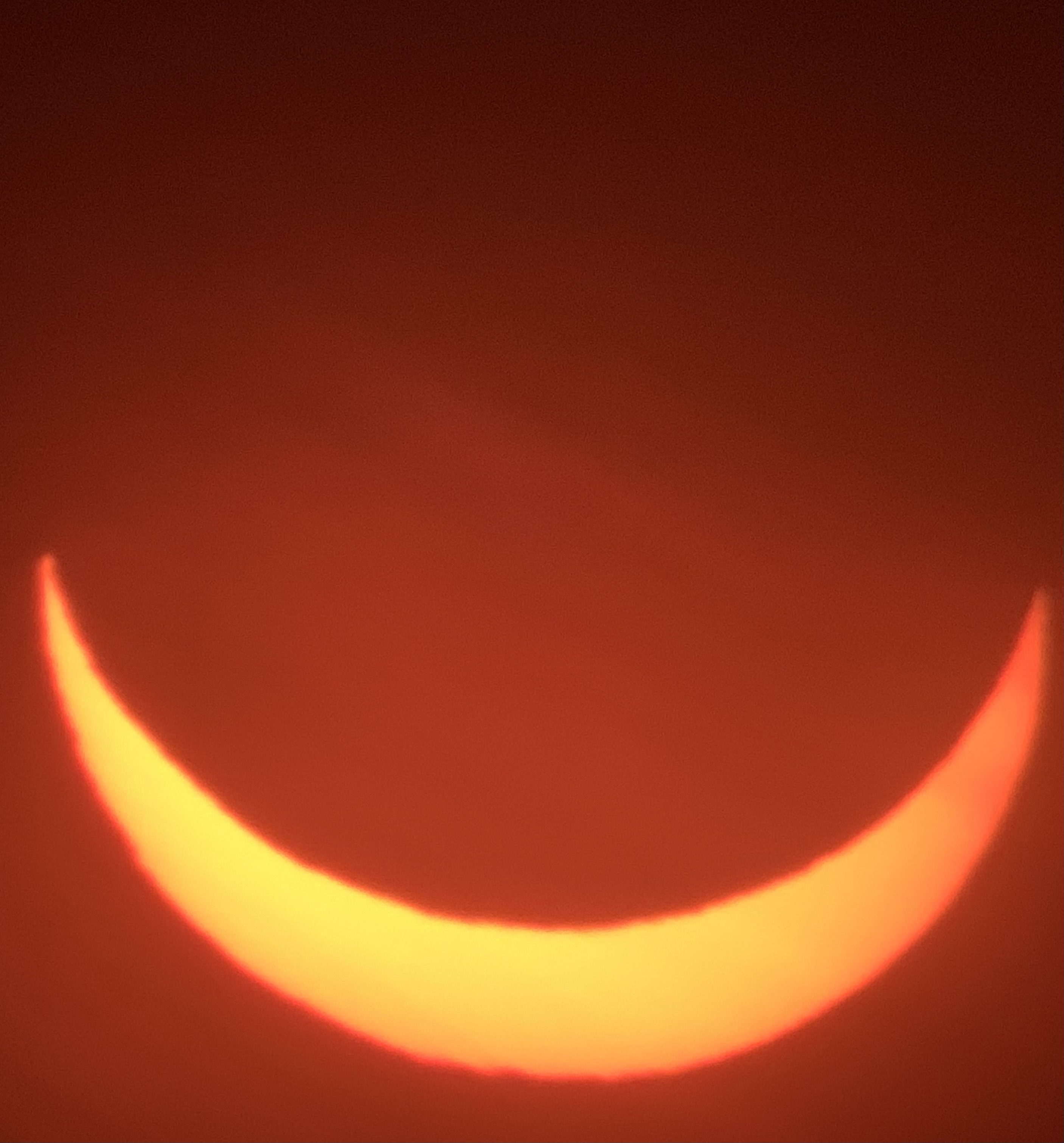
Devil’s Horns phenomenon from Halifax, 10:19 UTC

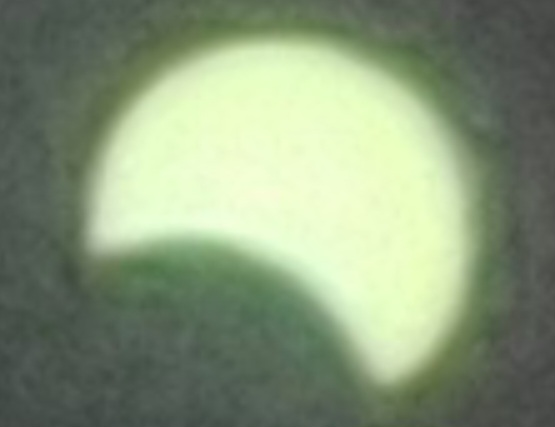
West Midlands, England, 11:05 UTC

Hilden, Germany, 11:18 UTC

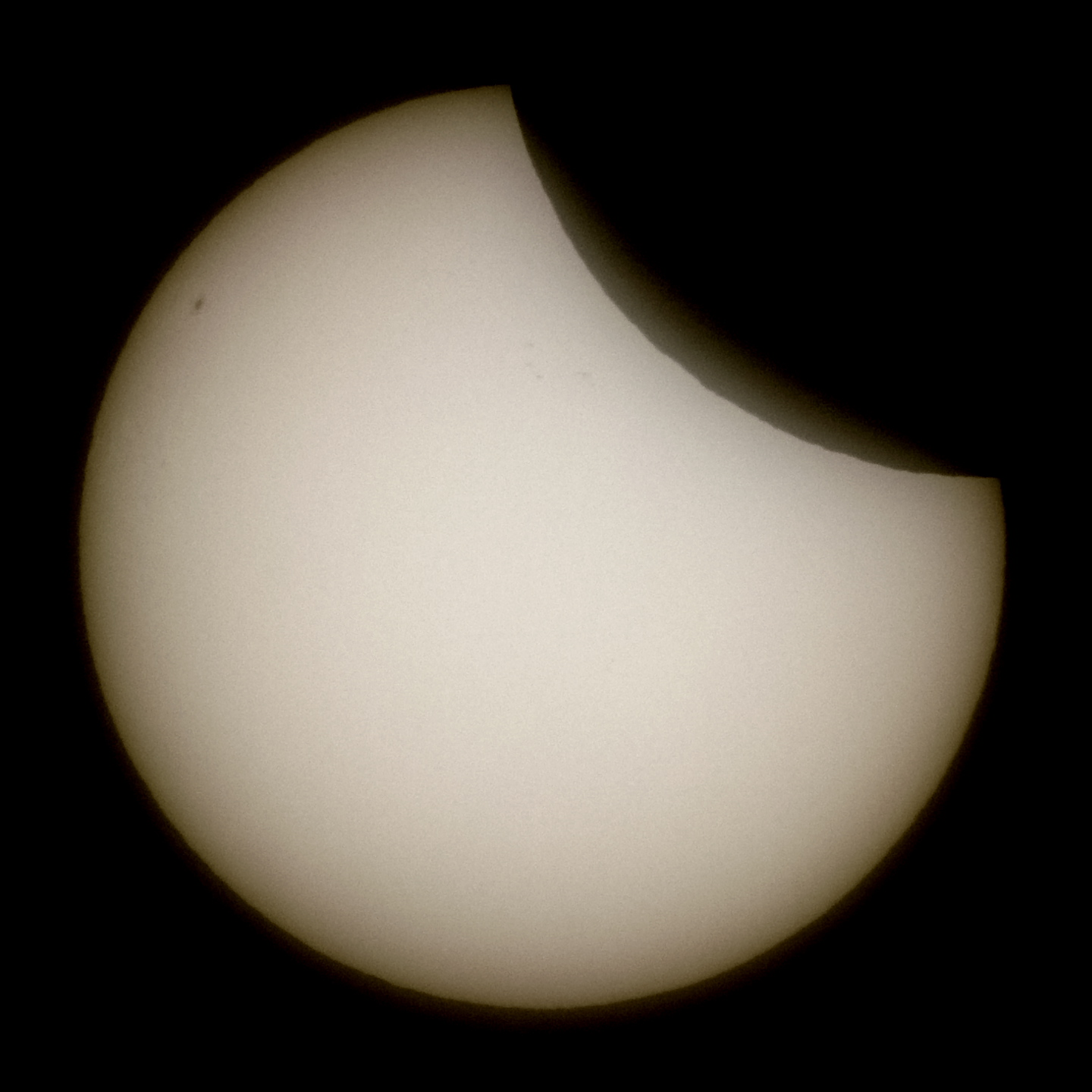
Berlin, Germany, 11:19 UTC

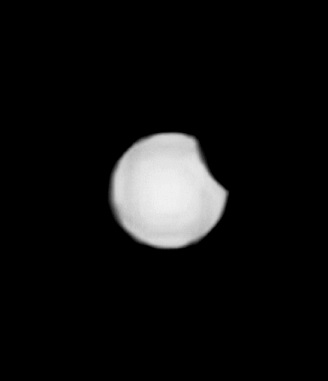
Lutkówka, Poland, 11:23 UTC

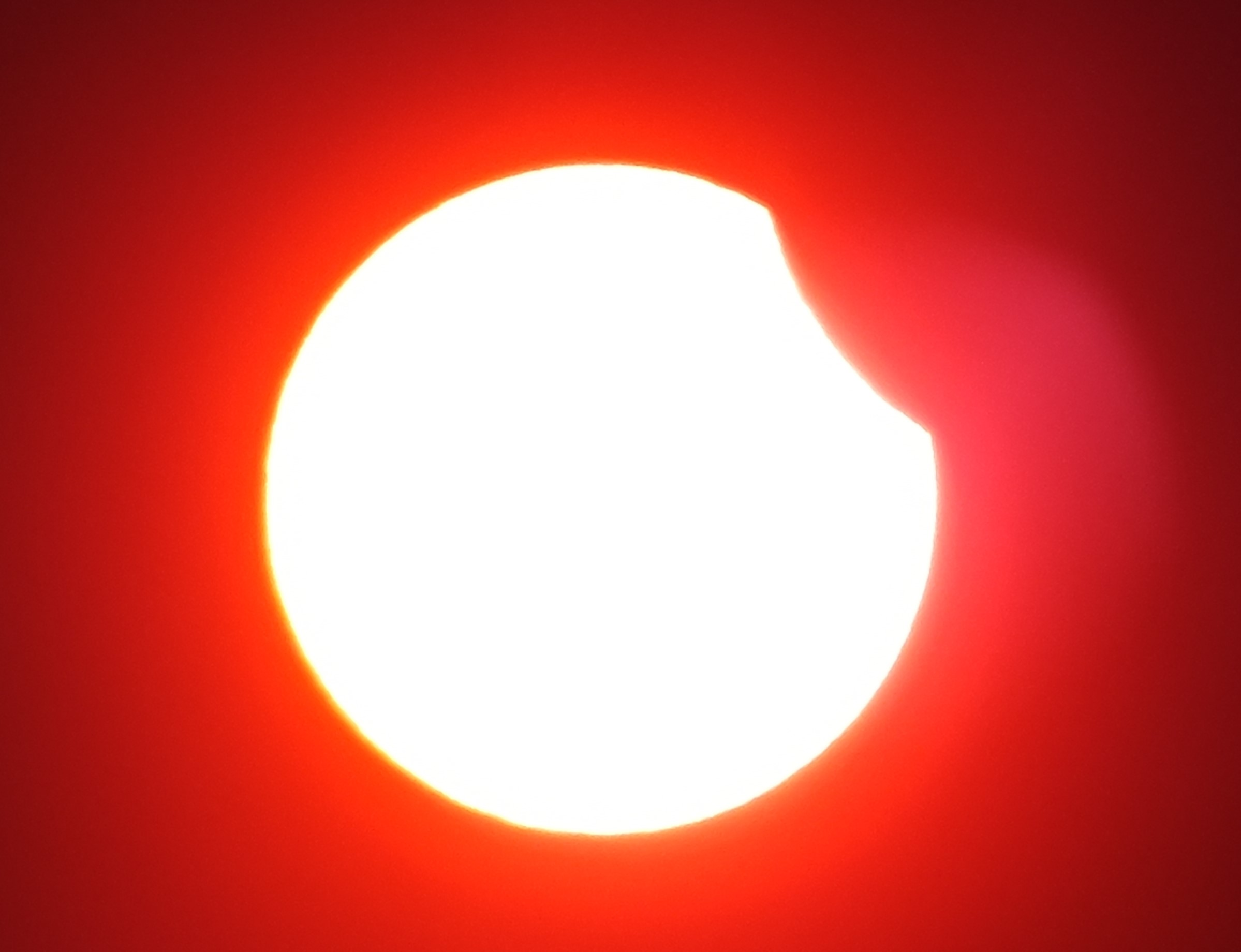
Klin, Russia, 11:49 UTC

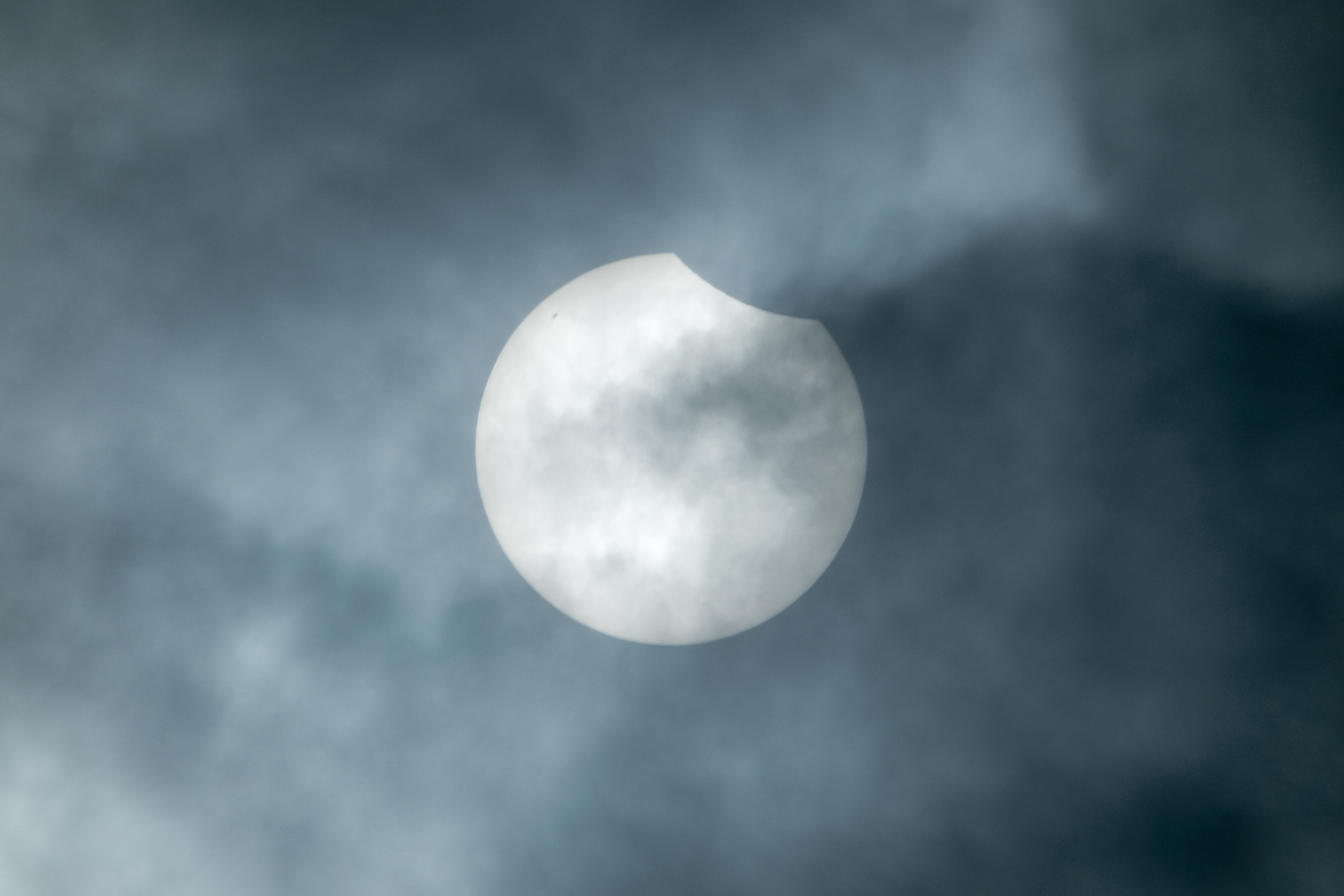
Prague, Czech Republic, 11:50 UTC

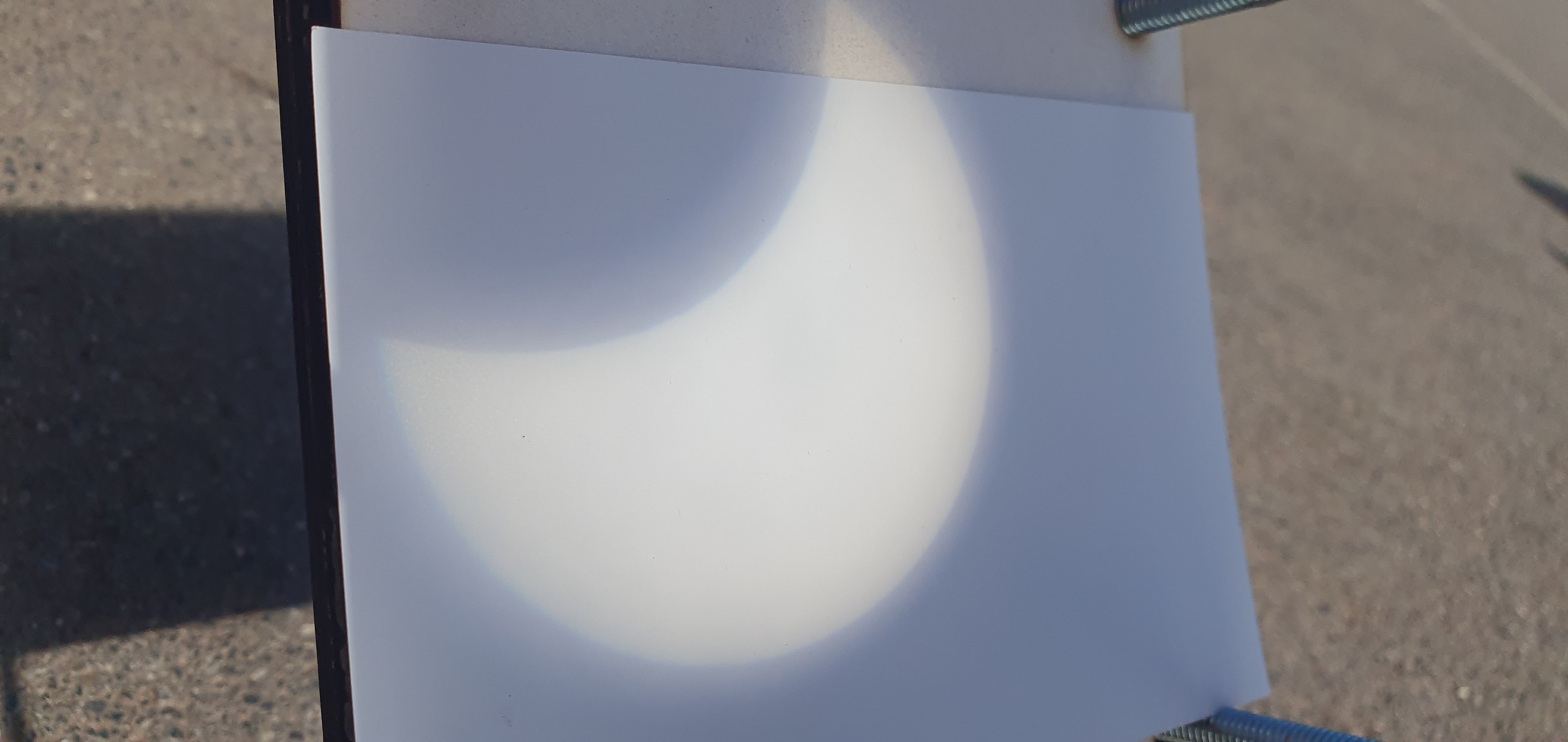
Eclipse projection from Torquay, England

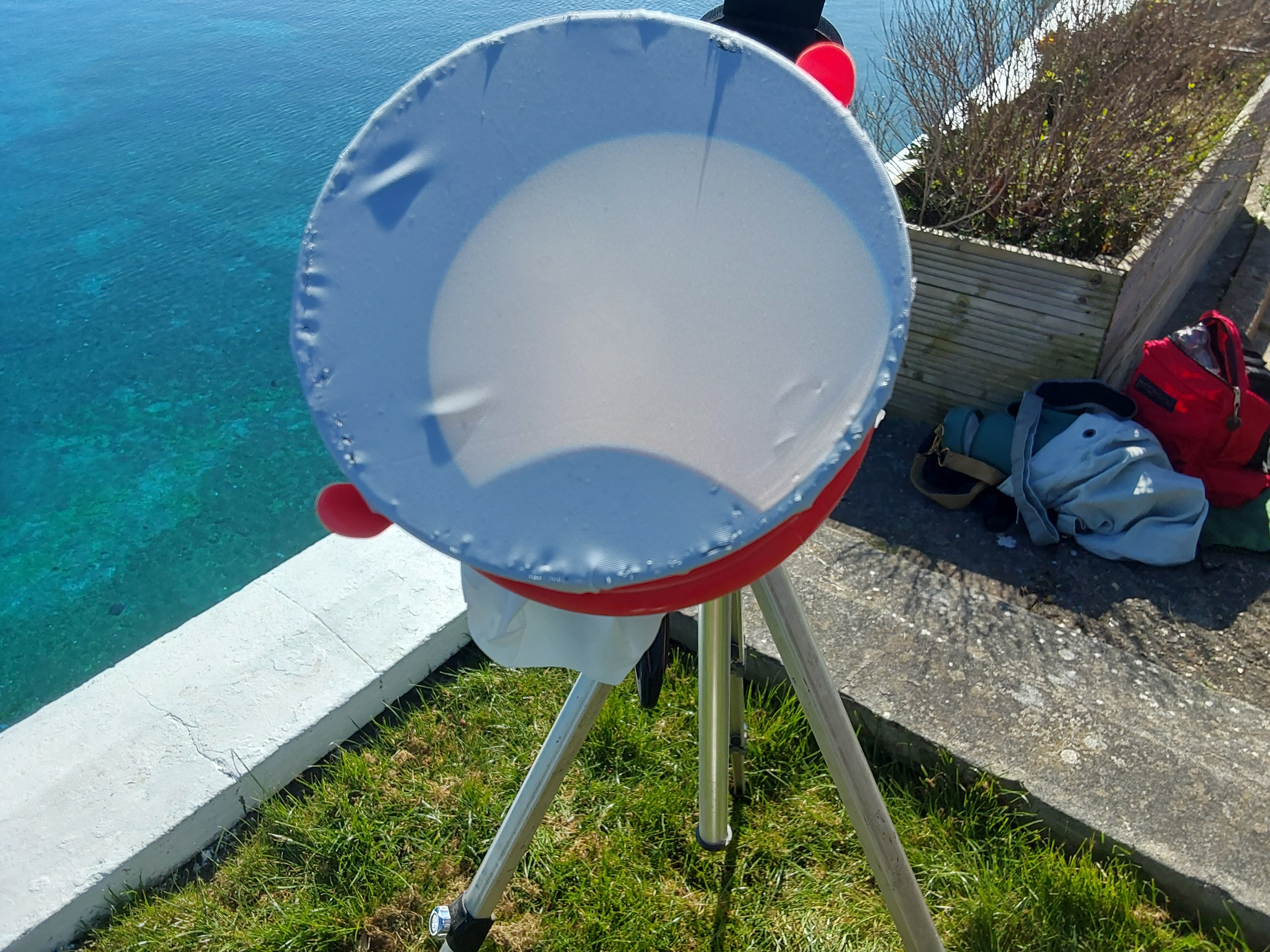
Projection on telescope from Ramsgate, England

Video of the eclipse from Brastad, Sweden

Animation from Belfort, France

== Eclipse timing ==
=== Places experiencing partial eclipse ===
Solar Eclipse of March 29, 2025 (Local Times)
Country or territory	City or place	Start of partial eclipse	Maximum eclipse	End of partial eclipse	Duration of eclipse (hr:min)	Maximum coverage
Bermuda	Hamilton	07:10:52 (sunrise)	07:13:24	07:49:32	0:39	49.30%
Portugal	Ponta Delgada	08:18:19	09:15:28	10:16:42	1:58	48.63%
Canada	Halifax	07:00:13 (sunrise)	07:17:27	08:13:02	1:13	82.82%
Saint Pierre and Miquelon	Saint-Pierre	07:29:24 (sunrise)	08:21:14	09:19:04	1:50	83.25%
United States	Presque Isle	06:16:45 (sunrise)	06:21:20	07:16:11	0:59	85.44%
Morocco	Casablanca	09:34:14	10:22:34	11:13:18	1:39	17.25%
Canada	St. John's	06:57:51	07:53:04	08:51:52	1:54	82.59%
United States	Augusta	06:25:12 (sunrise)	06:28:53	07:11:37	0:46	69.40%
Portugal	Lisbon	09:37:25	10:31:15	11:27:47	1:50	26.53%
Spain	Madrid	10:48:51	11:40:17	12:33:44	1:45	20.59%
Canada	Kuujjuaq	06:09:01 (sunrise)	06:41:19	07:37:29	1:28	92.39%
Canada	Montreal	06:39:38 (sunrise)	06:42:42	07:13:39	0:34	46.81%
United States	New York City	06:44:01 (sunrise)	06:46:51	07:05:01	0:21	21.98%
Greenland	Nuuk	07:57:21	08:54:05	09:53:09	1:56	87.45%
Ireland	Dublin	10:01:36	11:00:25	12:01:02	1:59	41.26%
France	Paris	11:08:54	12:02:05	12:56:28	1:48	23.48%
Isle of Man	Douglas	10:04:52	11:03:21	12:03:25	1:59	39.89%
United Kingdom	London	10:07:32	11:03:34	12:00:57	1:53	30.59%
Iceland	Reykjavík	10:05:53	11:05:41	12:07:19	2:01	67.70%
Belgium	Brussels	11:14:14	12:07:22	13:01:26	1:47	23.66%
Netherlands	Amsterdam	11:16:26	12:10:09	13:04:44	1:48	25.19%
Faroe Islands	Tórshavn	10:13:07	11:12:33	12:13:14	2:00	51.47%
Germany	Berlin	11:32:30	12:19:48	13:07:19	1:35	15.24%
Denmark	Copenhagen	11:31:31	12:22:27	13:13:34	1:42	21.14%
Norway	Oslo	11:30:25	12:24:50	13:19:26	1:49	29.93%
Sweden	Stockholm	11:40:57	12:31:14	13:21:20	1:40	21.64%
Svalbard and Jan Mayen	Longyearbyen	11:41:54	12:37:01	13:32:00	1:50	52.99%
Finland	Helsinki	12:51:28	13:38:14	14:24:32	1:33	17.13%
Finland	Rovaniemi	12:49:18	13:40:46	14:31:44	1:42	28.39%
Russia	Belushya Guba	14:07:05	14:54:12	15:40:25	1:33	25.80%

== Eclipse details ==
Shown below are two tables displaying details about this particular solar eclipse. The first table outlines times at which the Moon's penumbra or umbra attains the specific parameter, and the second table describes various other parameters pertaining to this eclipse.

March 29, 2025 Solar Eclipse Times
Event	Time (UTC)
First Penumbral External Contact	2025 March 29 at 08:51:52.5 UTC
Greatest Eclipse	2025 March 29 at 10:48:36.1 UTC
Ecliptic Conjunction	2025 March 29 at 10:58:59.4 UTC
Equatorial Conjunction	2025 March 29 at 11:47:27.0 UTC
Last Penumbral External Contact	2025 March 29 at 12:44:54.0 UTC

March 29, 2025 Solar Eclipse Parameters
Parameter	Value
Eclipse Magnitude	0.93760
Eclipse Obscuration	0.93057
Gamma	1.04053
Sun Right Ascension	00h33m03.1s
Sun Declination	+03°33'55.0"
Sun Semi-Diameter	16'01.1"
Sun Equatorial Horizontal Parallax	08.8"
Moon Right Ascension	00h31m00.8s
Moon Declination	+04°29'34.1"
Moon Semi-Diameter	16'39.4"
Moon Equatorial Horizontal Parallax	1°01'07.8"
ΔT (which is TD – UT)	71.9 s

== Eclipse season ==
This eclipse is part of an eclipse season, a period, roughly every six months, when eclipses occur. Only two (or occasionally three) eclipse seasons occur each year, and each season lasts about 35 days and repeats just short of six months (173 days) later; thus two full eclipse seasons always occur each year. Either two or three eclipses happen each eclipse season. In the sequence below, each eclipse is separated by a fortnight.

Eclipse season of March 2025
March 14 Descending node (full moon)	March 29 Ascending node (new moon)
Total lunar eclipse Lunar Saros 123	Partial solar eclipse Solar Saros 149

== Related eclipses ==
=== Eclipses in 2025 ===
- A total lunar eclipse on March 14.
- A partial solar eclipse on March 29.
- A total lunar eclipse on September 7.
- A partial solar eclipse on September 21.

=== Metonic ===
- Preceded by: Solar eclipse of June 10, 2021
- Followed by: Solar eclipse of January 14, 2029

=== Tzolkinex ===
- Preceded by: Solar eclipse of February 15, 2018
- Followed by: Solar eclipse of May 9, 2032

=== Half-Saros ===
- Preceded by: Lunar eclipse of March 23, 2016
- Followed by: Lunar eclipse of April 3, 2034

=== Tritos ===
- Preceded by: Solar eclipse of April 29, 2014
- Followed by: Solar eclipse of February 27, 2036

=== Solar Saros 149 ===
- Preceded by: Solar eclipse of March 19, 2007
- Followed by: Solar eclipse of April 9, 2043

=== Inex ===
- Preceded by: Solar eclipse of April 17, 1996
- Followed by: Solar eclipse of March 9, 2054

=== Triad ===
- Preceded by: Solar eclipse of May 29, 1938
- Followed by: Solar eclipse of January 29, 2112

=== Solar eclipses of 2022–2025 ===
Solar eclipse series sets from 2022 to 2025
Ascending node			Descending node		
Saros	Map	Gamma	Saros	Map	Gamma
119 Partial in CTIO, Chile	April 30, 2022 Partial	−1.19008	124 Partial from Saratov, Russia	October 25, 2022 Partial	1.07014
129 Totality in Timor-Leste	April 20, 2023 Hybrid	−0.39515	134 Annularity from Mexican Hat, Utah, USA	October 14, 2023 Annular	0.37534
139 Totality in Dallas, TX, USA	April 8, 2024 Total	0.34314	144 Annularity in Santa Cruz Province, Argentina	October 2, 2024 Annular	−0.35087
149 Partial from Halifax, Canada	March 29, 2025 Partial	1.04053	154	September 21, 2025 Partial	−1.06509

=== Saros 149 ===
This eclipse is a part of Saros series 149, repeating every 18 years, 11 days, 8 hours and containing 71 events. The series started with a partial solar eclipse on August 21, 1664. It contains total eclipses from April 9, 2043 through October 2, 2331; hybrid eclipses from October 13, 2349 through November 3, 2385; and annular eclipses from November 15, 2403 through July 13, 2800. The series ends at member 71 as a partial eclipse on September 28, 2926. Its eclipses are tabulated in three columns; every third eclipse in the same column is one exeligmos apart, so they all cast shadows over approximately the same parts of the Earth.

The longest duration of totality will be produced by member 31 at 4 minutes, 10 seconds on July 17, 2205, and the longest duration of annularity will be produced by member 62 at 5 minutes, 6 seconds on June 21, 2764. All eclipses in this series occur at the Moon’s ascending node of orbit.

Series members 9–30 occur between 1801 and 2200:
9	10	11
November 18, 1808	November 29, 1826	December 9, 1844
12	13	14
December 21, 1862	December 31, 1880	January 11, 1899
15	16	17
January 23, 1917	February 3, 1935	February 14, 1953
18	19	20
February 25, 1971	March 7, 1989	March 19, 2007
21	22	23
March 29, 2025	April 9, 2043	April 20, 2061
24	25	26
May 1, 2079	May 11, 2097	May 24, 2115
27	28	29
June 3, 2133	June 14, 2151	June 25, 2169
30
July 6, 2187

=== Metonic series ===
The metonic series repeats eclipses every 19 years (6939.69 days), lasting about 5 cycles. Eclipses occur in nearly the same calendar date. In addition, the octon subseries repeats 1/5 of that or every 3.8 years (1387.94 days). All eclipses in this table occur at the Moon's ascending node.

20 eclipse events between June 10, 1964 and August 21, 2036
June 10–11	March 28–29	January 14–16	November 3	August 21–22
117	119	121	123	125
June 10, 1964	March 28, 1968	January 16, 1972	November 3, 1975	August 22, 1979
127	129	131	133	135
June 11, 1983	March 29, 1987	January 15, 1991	November 3, 1994	August 22, 1998
137	139	141	143	145
June 10, 2002	March 29, 2006	January 15, 2010	November 3, 2013	August 21, 2017
147	149	151	153	155
June 10, 2021	March 29, 2025	January 14, 2029	November 3, 2032	August 21, 2036

=== Tritos series ===
This eclipse is a part of a tritos cycle, repeating at alternating nodes every 135 synodic months (≈ 3986.63 days, or 11 years minus 1 month). Their appearance and longitude are irregular due to a lack of synchronization with the anomalistic month (period of perigee), but groupings of 3 tritos cycles (≈ 33 years minus 3 months) come close (≈ 434.044 anomalistic months), so eclipses are similar in these groupings.

The partial solar eclipses on December 18, 2188 (part of Saros 164) and November 18, 2199 (part of Saros 165) are also a part of this series but are not included in the table below.

Series members between 1801 and 2134
December 10, 1806 (Saros 129)	November 9, 1817 (Saros 130)	October 9, 1828 (Saros 131)	September 7, 1839 (Saros 132)	August 7, 1850 (Saros 133)
July 8, 1861 (Saros 134)	June 6, 1872 (Saros 135)	May 6, 1883 (Saros 136)	April 6, 1894 (Saros 137)	March 6, 1905 (Saros 138)
February 3, 1916 (Saros 139)	January 3, 1927 (Saros 140)	December 2, 1937 (Saros 141)	November 1, 1948 (Saros 142)	October 2, 1959 (Saros 143)
August 31, 1970 (Saros 144)	July 31, 1981 (Saros 145)	June 30, 1992 (Saros 146)	May 31, 2003 (Saros 147)	April 29, 2014 (Saros 148)
March 29, 2025 (Saros 149)	February 27, 2036 (Saros 150)	January 26, 2047 (Saros 151)	December 26, 2057 (Saros 152)	November 24, 2068 (Saros 153)
October 24, 2079 (Saros 154)	September 23, 2090 (Saros 155)	August 24, 2101 (Saros 156)	July 23, 2112 (Saros 157)	June 23, 2123 (Saros 158)
May 23, 2134 (Saros 159)

=== Inex series ===
This eclipse is a part of the long period inex cycle, repeating at alternating nodes, every 358 synodic months (≈ 10,571.95 days, or 29 years minus 20 days). Their appearance and longitude are irregular due to a lack of synchronization with the anomalistic month (period of perigee). However, groupings of 3 inex cycles (≈ 87 years minus 2 months) comes close (≈ 1,151.02 anomalistic months), so eclipses are similar in these groupings.

Series members between 1801 and 2200
August 16, 1822 (Saros 142)	July 28, 1851 (Saros 143)	July 7, 1880 (Saros 144)
June 17, 1909 (Saros 145)	May 29, 1938 (Saros 146)	May 9, 1967 (Saros 147)
April 17, 1996 (Saros 148)	March 29, 2025 (Saros 149)	March 9, 2054 (Saros 150)
February 16, 2083 (Saros 151)	January 29, 2112 (Saros 152)	January 8, 2141 (Saros 153)
December 18, 2169 (Saros 154)	November 28, 2198 (Saros 155)	
