= Maria Grzegorzewska =

Polish educator (1887–1967)

- Grzegorzewska, 1964
- Born: 18 April 1887; Wołucza in the Kingdom of Poland of the Russian Empire
- Died: 7 May 1967 (aged 80); Zalesie Dolne, Polish People's Republic
- Education: Jagiellonian University, University of Paris
- Occupation: Educator
- Known for: Special education pioneer in Poland

Maria Grzegorzewska (18 April 1887 – 7 May 1967) was a Polish educator who brought the special education movement to Poland. Born to a family from the Żmudź region, she was strongly influenced by her parents' beliefs in humanitarianism. After attending clandestine schools to earn her basic education from Polish rather than Russian educators, she obtained her teaching credentials in Lithuania. She continued her education at the Jagiellonian University in Kraków and in 1913 joined her countrywoman, Józefa Joteyko in Brussels to study at the International Paedological Faculty. When her studies in Belgium were interrupted by World War I, Grzegorzewska made her way to Paris and earned her PhD from the Sorbonne in 1916.

After the establishment of the Second Polish Republic in 1918, Grzegorzewska returned to Poland intent upon creating programs which addressed the needs of disabled children and introducing educational reforms to improve their lives. In 1919, she began working for the Ministry of Religious Affairs and Public Education, establishing facilities for the care of disabled children, schools for special education, and training programs for teachers. Using her own methodology, she designed curriculum which in 1922 was implemented at the newly founded State Institute of Special Education (Polish: Państwowy Instytut Pedagogiki Specjalnej). She directed this institute from its founding until her death.

During World War II, Grzegorzewska worked as a nurse, was active in the Polish resistance movement, and taught in Warsaw. She joined Żegota and provided assistance to Jews. When Poland was liberated in 1945, Grzegorzewska reactivated the Special Education Institute and within five years introduced graduate and extramural courses to the curricula. In 1950, during the implementation of Stalinist doctrine in Poland, the school was renamed the State College of Special Education (Polish: Państwowe Studium Pedagogiki Specjalnej) and a state curricula was introduced. She struggled against the state program, wanting to protect special education and people with disabilities. After the 1956 thaw, the institute regained governmental support and reverted to its initial name. Between 1957 and 1960, was a full professor at the University of Warsaw. Her work in science and for the Polish education system were honored with numerous awards and distinctions.

== Early life ==
Maria Stefania Grzegorzewska was born on 18 April 1887 in Wołucza, a village in the Kingdom of Poland of the Russian Empire to Felicja (née Bogdanowicz) and Adolf Grzegorzewski. Both of her parents were from Żmudź, a region in modern-day Lithuania, and had moved to Wołucza, where they leased an estate. Her father served as the estate administrator and also oversaw neighboring farms, advocating for modernization of agricultural practices and humane treatment of workers. Her mother was involved in social projects to help local villagers and provided medical care in their community. The youngest of six siblings, including Zenon, Wanda, Helena, Witold and Władysław, Grzegorzewska was influenced by her parents' sense of duty to their community. From a young age, she developed a sense of social responsibility.

In 1900, when Grzegorzewska began her education in Poland, Russification programs caused many parents to send their children to clandestine private schools so that they could study Polish culture and language. She studied at a boarding school in Warsaw operated by Mrs. Kotwicki for four years and then entered Paulina Hewelke's school, completing an additional three years of schooling before graduating in 1907. She immediately entered a one-year, university preparatory course led by Ludwik Krzywicki from the Department of Mathematics and Natural Sciences at the University of Warsaw. During her studies, she met and became involved with a group of social activists which included Marian Falski, Helena Radlińska, and Stefania Sempołowska. Participating in the socialist youth underground and providing education for workers brought her to the attention of the tsarist police, forcing Grzegorzewska to flee to Lithuania. In Lithuania, she earned a diploma as a private teacher and took in students in their homes to earn money to enter university.

In 1909, Grzegorzewska began her studies at the Jagiellonian University in Kraków, simultaneously working as a tutor, lecturing at the Adam Mickiewicz People's University, and performing odd jobs, such as gluing envelopes. For two years, she studied and worked in Kraków, but a lack of proper nutrition and sleep impacted her health. Because of a lung disease, Grzegorzewska left school to seek treatment in Zakopane, where her fiancé Czesław had been to treat his tuberculosis. Czesław died after a few months, sending Grzegorzewska into a depression. Staying at the Villa Osobita, she met Władysław Heinrich, who told her of the work being done in paedology by her countrywoman, Józefa Joteyko in Belgium. She began a correspondence with Joteyko and after a trip to Italy with her family returned to Zakopane, where she tutored to earn enough money to continue her studies in Brussels.

== Life abroad ==
In 1913, Grzegorzewska arrived at the International Paedological Faculty of Brussels and began studying with Joteyko. Taking courses in pedagogy, psychology, and sociology, she began to meet eminent scholars and scientists, like Édouard Claparède, Émile Jaques-Dalcroze, and Ovide Decroly, among others, who influenced her development. Though the faculty of the school was a mix of international scientists, she shared lodging with Polish students Józefa Berggruen, Stefania Chmielakówna and Wanda Wosińska. As part of her research, Grzegorzewska began a study in the public schools in Brussels on children's aesthetical development. Initially, Grzegorzewska was drawn to the broad range of Joteyko's knowledge and her empathy toward children and the poor. As their relationship evolved, they became companions in both their professional and private lives. In 1914, Grzegorzewska returned to Poland on a vacation to see her family and was there at the start of World War I. Traveling on a war ship through the mined North Sea, she rejoined Joteyko in London in 1915. After a short stay, the two migrated to Paris, where Joteyko began teaching at the Collège de France and Grzegorzewska enrolled at the Sorbonne.

Continuing her interest in aesthetics, Grzegorzewska compiled her research from Belgium into a thesis Study on the Development of Aesthetic Feelings – Research in the Field of Experimental Aesthetics Conducted among Students of Brussels Schools (Polish: Studium na temat rozwoju uczuć estetycznych – badania z zakresu estetyki eksperymentalnej przeprowadzone wśród uczniów szkół brukselskich), earning her PhD in 1916. While she was working on her dissertation, Grzegorzewska took part in a field trip to the Bicêtre Hospital, a psychiatric facility which treated people with severe intellectual disabilities. The excursion had a profound effect on her and she determined that her life's work would be involved with providing equal access and education to people with disabilities. She began working in a school for intellectually disabled students in Paris and created a method, based on her training and experience, to work with pupils. In 1918, she and Joteyko founded the Polish Teaching League (French: Ligue Polonaise d'Enseignement, Polish: Polska Liga Nauczania) in Paris with the purpose of helping exiled Poles involved in the independence movement gather materials on education and teaching methodology. They planned to use the materials to help develop a modern school system once Poland regained its independence. Grzegorzewska wrote an article for the League, On the Need to Organize Special Education for Abnormal Children in Poland (Polish: O konieczności zorganizowania specjalnego szkolnictwa dla dzieci anormalnych w Polsce).

== Return to Poland ==
In May 1919, Grzegorzewska and Joteyko returned to Poland, soon after the establishment of the Second Polish Republic. After a few months began working as an assistant in the Ministry of Religious Affairs and Public Education. She was tasked with managing the development of special education for schools, institutions and educators. At the time, the only special education facilities in the country consisted of bureaus for the blind in Bydgoszcz and Lviv, a bureau for the deaf in Warsaw, and supplementary schools to assist with support services in Warsaw and Łódź. As Joteyko had been denied placement at the University of Warsaw, Grzegorzewska helped her find work as a lecturer at the National Pedagogical Institute (Polish: Państwowy Instytut Pedagogiczny) and National Institute of the Deaf (Polish: Instytut Głuchoniemych w Warszawie)in Warsaw. Though at the time in Poland, there were limited facilities which had been established for deaf, blind, and intellectually disabled people, there was no national system to address the education of those living with physical or mental impairments. Grzegorzewska aimed to implement educational methods she designed, mandatory training for teachers, and on-going research projects to assess the system over time. Her educational method adopted a holistic approach which included addressing care, barriers to everyday functioning, and the education of disabled people, but also their social integration and socio-professional development. It approached evaluating chronically ill, disabled, or socially maladjusted children from an interdisciplinary, scientific stance, rather than focusing on their perceived defects.

After a three-year period, in which she reorganized her teaching course several times, Grzegorzewska founded the State Institute of Special Education (Polish: Państwowy Instytut Pedagogiki Specjalnej) in 1922. She served as the director of the Institute from its inception until her death. In 1924, she founded the journal, Special School (Polish: Szkoła specjalna) to publish about the field and spur scientific work to develop "innovative methods of revalidation" for maladjusted and disabled children, which she directed to the end of her life. When Joteyko's heart condition became worse in 1927, Grzegorzewska took charge of her care until her death the following year. In 1930 founded and directed the State Teacher's Institute (Polish: Państwowy Instytut Nauczycielski), to give educators a facility for improving their skills through further education and training on teaching techniques. She was dismissed from the Teacher's Institute in 1935 because she opposed the authoritarian rule advocated by the Sanacja movement. In 1927 she published a book, Psychological Structure of Visual and Tactile Reading (Polish: Struktura psychiczna czytania wzrokowego i dotykowego). She participated in many conferences, including the 4th Congress of the International New Education League held in 1927 in Locarno, Switzerland; the 2nd Congress of Teachers of Special Schools hosted in 1934; and the 1st National Children's Congress of 1938.

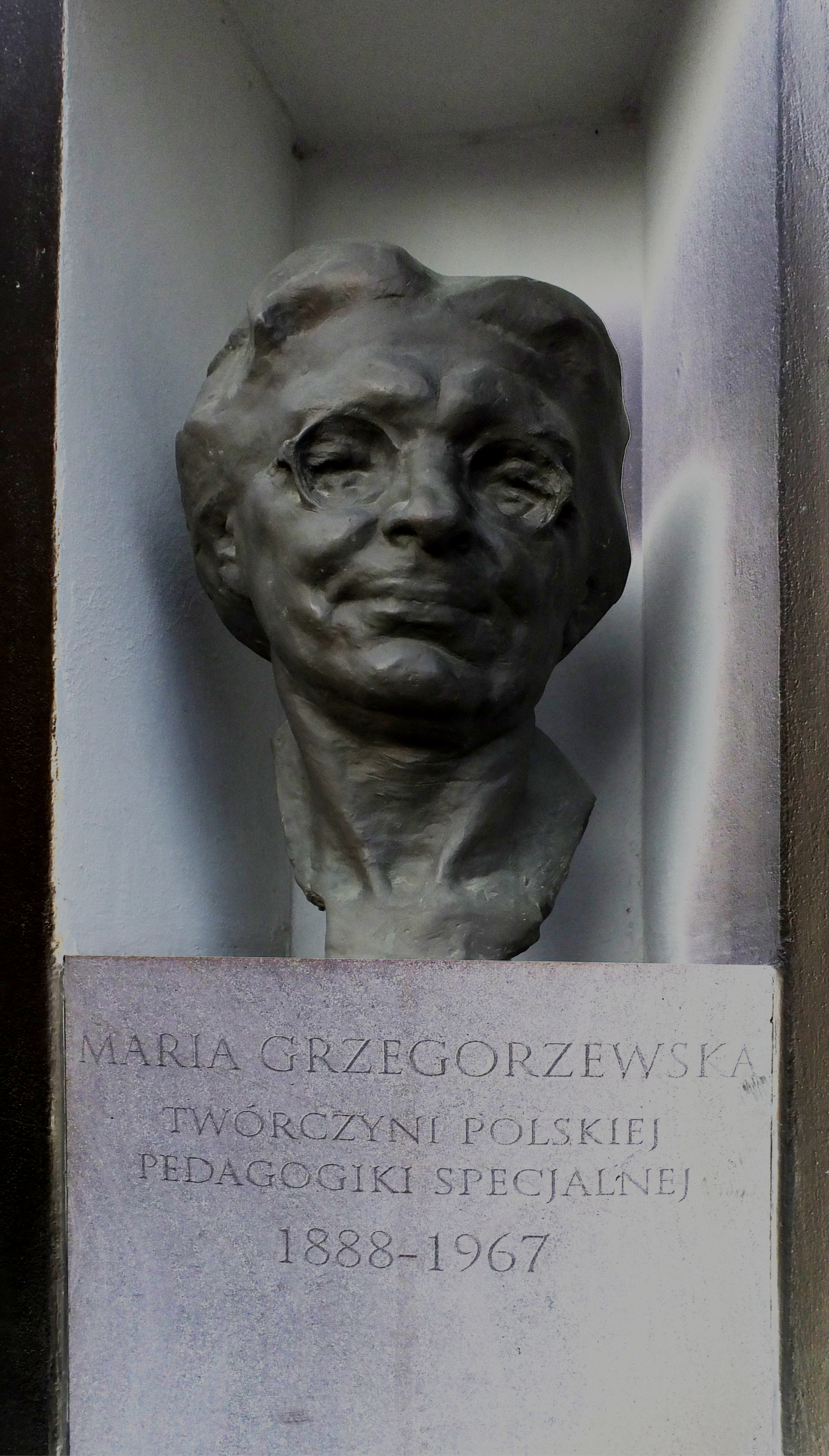
Grzegorzewska statue at the Academy of Special Education in Warsaw

With the onset of World War II in 1939, the Special Education Institute was closed, and Grzegorzewska began working as a nurse in an army hospital run by the Polish Red Cross. Between 1939 and 1944, she taught at Special School No. 177 in Warsaw and participated in the clandestine educational system. Active in the Polish resistance movement, she distributed arms and pamphlets; joined Żegota, providing "meritorious" assistance to Jews; and took part in hiding Jews to save their lives. She served as a member of Ochota's health patrol during the Warsaw Uprising. During the uprising, her house was destroyed, and in it, unpublished manuscripts of two of her books, second volume of Psychology of the Deaf (Polish: Psychologia niewidomych), first volume published in 1930) and Teacher's Personality (Polish: Osobowość nauczyciela). After Poland was liberated in 1945, Grzegorzewska reactivated the Special Education Institute, which had been destroyed during the conflict. Recognizing that 30% of the teachers had died in the war, she initiated programs to help train new teachers quickly. The Polish Teachers' Union was reestablished and she began research to evaluate existing educational programs, teachers' socio-economic status, and the role of schools in their communities, among other topics.

In 1947, Grzegorzewska published the first volume of her magnum opus Letters to a Young Teacher (Polish: Listy do młodego nauczyciela) in which she set forth her thoughts on the relationship of teachers to their students and the impact that educators have on a pupil's development. In the book, she discussed solutions to improve the lives of people with disabilities by overcoming their functional limitations, including their living conditions. She stressed that lessons should be grounded in flexible activity, which met the abilities of students and stimulated their learning. She noted the importance of adequate breaks to prevent overstimulation. Creating a detailed classification system, she advocated that the spectrum of disabilities was extremely broad and required teachers to individualize training to meet students' needs. She chose the title to convey that the information in the book was a dialogue, intended to generate reflection and inspiration, as well as feedback from teachers. The entire work contained 24 letters, published in 3 volumes, between 1947 and 1961. The first volume along with practical advice, focused on building community among teachers, encouraging them to help each other. Other letters gave historic information on innovators in education, and still others discussed humanitarian and ethical values as the keys to self-knowledge and coping mechanisms for change, which could in turn motivate and inspire others. She was less interested in structure of materials and more focused upon providing assistance which recognized the dignity and right to equality of all life. The volumes were influential in the international development of thought on education in general, as well as special education.

In 1950, Grzegorzewska introduced extramural and postgraduate courses at the Institute of Special Education, but in March, the school was renamed the State College of Special Education (Polish: Państwowe Studium Pedagogiki Specjalnej) and a state curricula was introduced. During the remainder of the Stalinist period, her activities were "received coldly" by those in power in the Polish People's Republic, as the official position was that people with disabilities needed no special consideration. Teachers who were judged to be insufficiently Marxist were dismissed or demoted and teacher training was eliminated. She fought to protect special education and people with disabilities to prevent them from being harmed by production quotas and policies based on fear and suspicion. putting her job in jeopardy. When the 1956 thaw granted the Polish government greater autonomy from Russian policies, she regained the support of authorities and the name of the Institute was reestablished. From 1957 to 1960 she was a full professor at the University of Warsaw and the chair of the first Polish Department of Special Pedagogy. She introduced tertiary courses in special education for the University of Warsaw. Her later major works include Analysis of Compensation Occurrences among the Deaf and Mute (Polish: Analiza zjawisk kompensacji u głuchych i niewidomych, 1959) and Selection of Works (Polish: Wybór pism, 1964). Her work in science and the Polish education system were honored with numerous awards and distinctions at the end of her life.

== Death and legacy ==
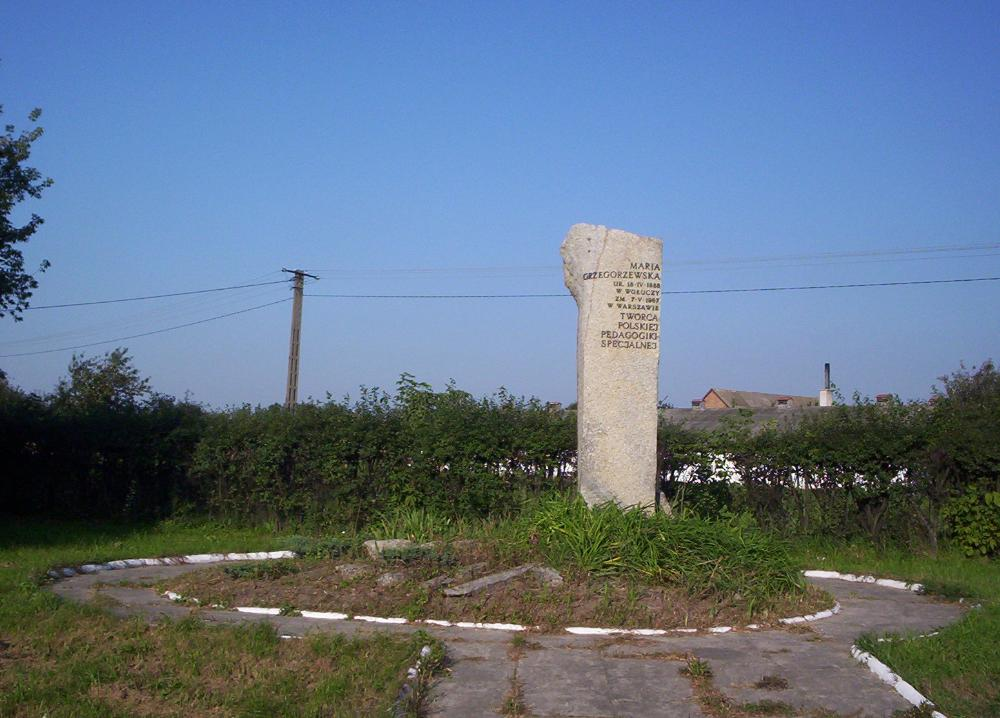
Monument to Grzegorzewska in Wołucza

Grzegorzewska died from a heart attack on 7 May 1967 at her home in Zalesie Dolne, a former town, which has been incorporated into the present city of Piaseczno, near Warsaw. She was buried in the Powązki Cemetery on the "Avenue of the Meritorious". She is remembered as the founder of the system of special education in Poland, as well as one of the people who advocated for the name of the field. Her approach of using special education to give to disabled or maladjusted children training to allow them to adapt to society and overcome the limitations of their mental and physical health marked a shift in the evolution of educational thought from treating the disability to recognizing the needs of the person. Jerzy Zawieyski based his novel The Way Home (Polish: Droga do domu) on the relationship of Grzegorzewska and Czesław.

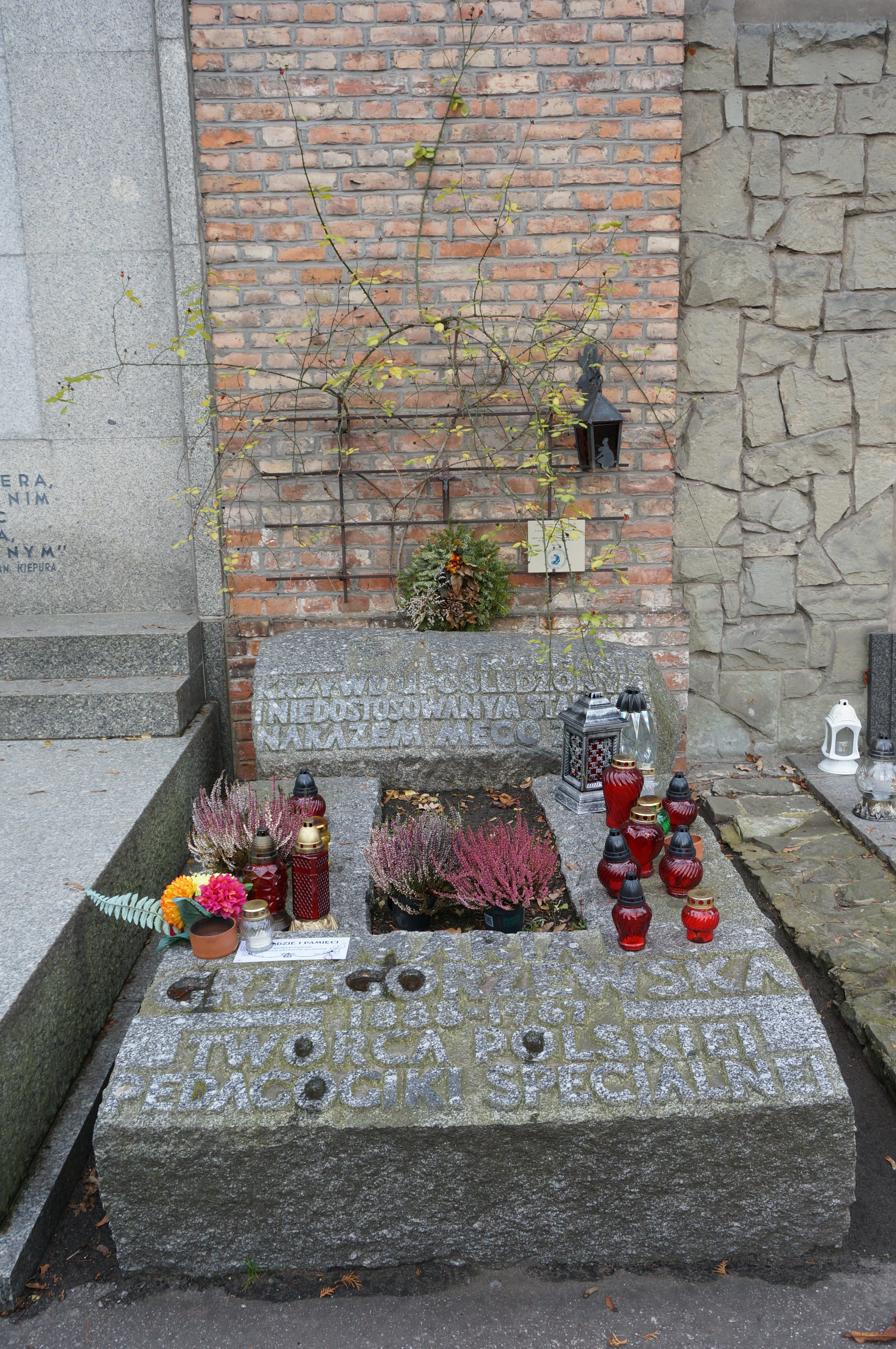
Grzegorzewska's gravestone, Powązki Cemetery

Grzegorzewska's work was known in other countries of the Eastern Bloc, like Yugoslavia, through translations and correspondence with others working in the field of disability from the 1930s. Contact with Veljko Ramadanović, who founded the first institution for disabled people in Serbia, led to students such as Božidar Karličić, Petar Meandžija, Desimir Ristović, and Ljubica Vucelić graduating from the programs of the State Institute of Special Education. A special education school in the city of Poznań, the Maria Grzegorzewska Special School Complex No. 103 (Polish: Zespół Szkół Specjalnych nr 103 im. Marii Grzegorzewskiej), was named in her honor in 1972. In 1976 the State Institute of Special Education in Warsaw which she had founded was named after her; it is now known as the Maria Grzegorzewska University (sometimes translated as the Maria Grzegorzewska Academy of Special Pedagogy (Polish: Akademia Pedagogiki Specjalnej im. Marii Grzegorzewskiej). There are two monuments dedicated to her; one near the school in Poznań and another one in Kurzeszyn, near Grzegorzewska's birthplace of Wołucza.
