= Zielone =

Zielone may refer to the following places in Poland:

- Zielone, Lower Silesian Voivodeship (south-west Poland)
- Zielone, Podlaskie Voivodeship (north-east Poland)
- Zielone, Łódź Voivodeship (central Poland)
- Zielone, Lublin Voivodeship (east Poland)
- Zielone, Warmian-Masurian Voivodeship (north Poland)
