= Wałowice =

Wałowice may refer to the following places:

- Wałowice, Łódź Voivodeship (central Poland)
- Wałowice, Lublin Voivodeship (east Poland)
- Wałowice, Lubusz Voivodeship (west Poland)
