= Podlas =

Podlas may refer to:

- Cities in Poland
  - Podlas, Lublin Voivodeship
  - Podlas, Łódź Voivodeship
- People
  - Kuzma Podlas, Soviet general
