= Lucjan =

Given name

Lucjan is a given name of Polish origin. Notable people with the name include:

- Lucjan Brychczy (1934–2024), Polish football player
- Lucjan Dobroszycki (1925–1995), Polish scientist and historian specializing in modern Polish and Polish-Jewish history
- Lucjan Karasiewicz (born 1979), Polish politician
- Lucjan Kudzia (born 1942), Polish luger who competed during the early 1960s
- Lucjan Kulej (1896–1971), Polish jurist and ice hockey player
- Lucjan Kydryński (1929–2006), Polish journalist and writer, radio and TV program host
- Lucjan Malinowski (1839–1898), Polish linguist, traveller, professor of Jagiellonian University
- Lucjan Rydel (1870–1918), Polish playwright and poet from the Young Poland movement
- Lucjan Siemieński (1807–1877), Polish Romantic poet, prose writer, and literary critic
- Lucjan Wolanowski (1920–2006), Polish journalist, writer and traveller
- Lucjan Zarzecki (1873–1925), Polish pedagogue and mathematician
- Lucjan Żeligowski (1865–1947), Polish general, and veteran of World War I, the Polish-Soviet War and World War II
