= Stary Dwór =

Stary Dwór may refer to the following places in Poland:

- Stary Dwór, Wołów County in Lower Silesian Voivodeship (south-west Poland)
- Stary Dwór, Wrocław County in Lower Silesian Voivodeship (south-west Poland)
- Stary Dwór, Kuyavian-Pomeranian Voivodeship (north-central Poland)
- Stary Dwór, Podlaskie Voivodeship (north-east Poland)
- Stary Dwór, Łódź Voivodeship (central Poland)
- Stary Dwór, Masovian Voivodeship (east-central Poland)
- Stary Dwór, Greater Poland Voivodeship (west-central Poland)
- Stary Dwór, Lubusz Voivodeship (west Poland)
- Stary Dwór, Gmina Chmielno in Pomeranian Voivodeship (north Poland)
- Stary Dwór, Gmina Somonino in Pomeranian Voivodeship (north Poland)
- Stary Dwór, Kwidzyn County in Pomeranian Voivodeship (north Poland)
- Stary Dwór, Sztum County in Pomeranian Voivodeship (north Poland)
- Stary Dwór, Gmina Dobre Miasto in Warmian-Masurian Voivodeship (north Poland)
- Stary Dwór, Gmina Stawiguda in Warmian-Masurian Voivodeship (north Poland)
