= Głuchówek =

Głuchówek may refer to the following places:

- Głuchówek, Greater Poland Voivodeship (west-central Poland)
- Głuchówek, Łódź Voivodeship (central Poland)
- Głuchówek, Masovian Voivodeship (east-central Poland)
