= Pokrzywna =

Pokrzywna may refer to the following places:

- Pokrzywna, Łódź Voivodeship (central Poland)
- Pokrzywna, Masovian Voivodeship (east-central Poland)
- Pokrzywna, Opole Voivodeship (south-west Poland)
