= Matyldów =

Matyldów may refer to the following places:

- Matyldów, Łódź Voivodeship (central Poland)
- Matyldów, Płock County in Masovian Voivodeship (east-central Poland)
- Matyldów, Sochaczew County in Masovian Voivodeship (east-central Poland)
