= Paulina Hewelke =

Polish educator and education activist

- Born: 16 November 1854; Pułtusk in the Kingdom of Poland of the Russian Empire
- Died: 28 January 1924 (aged 69); Warsaw, Second Polish Republic
- Occupations: teacher, education activist

Paulina Hewelke (16 November 1854 – 28 January 1924) was a Polish educator and education activist during the period when Russification policies forbade teaching Polish language and culture. Active in clandestine activities to teach Polish subjects, she participated in lectures for the Flying University and from 1896–1919 operated a girls' school in Warsaw. The school was one of the top women's schools in Warsaw and, upon her retirement, was purchased by the government, which still operates it as the Klementyna Hoffmanowa Lyceum and Secondary School IX.

== Early life ==
Paulina Hewelke was born on 16 November 1854 in Pułtusk in the Kingdom of Poland of the Russian Empire to Paulina Klementyna (née Baum) and Otton Karol Hewelke. Her father was the pastor of the Evangelical Church of the Augsburg Confession in Pułtusk. Hewelke had a younger brother, Otton (1858–1919), who would become a physician. She attended high school and earned her teaching credentials, becoming the family breadwinner upon her father's untimely death.

== Career ==
Hewelke began her career at the government gymnasium in Pułtusk. In 1883, after Aleksandr Apuchtin began the Russification policies, which prohibited Polish students from speaking their language and studying their culture. He began a series of purges to rid schools of Polish teachers and having little concern for students' education, (Note: „Pańska uczoność niezbyt mnie interesuje, natomiast od wszystkich wymagać będę rosyjskiego ducha” – oświadczył Kariejewowi już podczas pierwszego spotkania. ("I am not interested in your scholarship, but I will demand a Russian spirit from all of them," he [Apuchtin] told Kariejew [Mikołaj Iwanowicz Kariejew] during their first meeting.)) implemented policies to indoctrinate pupils into Russian culture.

Apuchtin demanded that each school have an Orthodox chapel, forbade outside organizations in schools, and, among other policies, implemented military drills and exercises in memorization, which Mikołaj Kariejew, a lecturer at the University of Warsaw, stated discouraged students from learning and made them resentful. In 1883, when University of Warsaw student Yevgeny Zhukovich slapped Apuchtin, causing student uprisings in support of Zhukovich's action, Hewelke quit her job and took her mother and brother to Warsaw.

Hewelke worked in private schools, simultaneously organizing clandestine courses in her apartment for women to study science. Later she began working at the boarding school run by Izabela Smolikowska and in 1896 she bought the school, changing it from a six-term school to an eight year program. The school was located at 122 Marszałkowska Street and occupied the ground floor of the building. The boarding dormitory was located on the third floor.

Most of the students were from upper and middle-class families, who were part of the intellectual Warsaw enclave. Some pupils were daughters of landowners from Lithuania and Ukraine and others were from less privileged backgrounds. Hewelke based the fees she charged on ability to pay and often reduced or waived tuition entirely for her poorer students. She organized secret courses on Polish culture and participated in creating lectures for the Flying University. Establishing practical exercises, the created a chemical and physical laboratory for her students. Recognizing the need for leisure, she also organized student summer holidays and supported scouting, which had recently emerged in Warsaw.

In 1905, Hewelke hired Zofia Cieszewska, an education women's rights activist, to run the dormitory and teach junior mathematics classes. That year, when the Narodowego Stowarzyszenie Nauczycielstwa Polskiego (National Association of Polish Teachers) was founded, Hewelke, along with Emilian Konopczyński and Marcin Szkopowski were on the inaugural board, chaired by Mieczysław Brzeziński. Among her students were writer Maria Dąbrowska; Maria Grzegorzewska, who initiated special education in Poland; and children's author, Maria Kownacka, among many others. After the Second Polish Republic was established, Hewelke brought in distinguished university professors like biologist Kazimierz Czerwiński, botanist Wacław Jezierski, geologist Stanisław Karczewski, sociologist Ludwik Krzywicki, physicist Tadeusz Miłobędzki, chemist Stefan Mycho, and mathematician Lucjan Zarzecki, among others. Hewelke earned the reputation of running "one of the best women's schools in Warsaw" and was active in the Kole Przełożonych Szkół (Circle of School Superiors) of the Warsaw school system.

== Later life, death, and legacy ==
In 1919, due to failing health, Hewelke sold her school to the government. Former students stepped in to help her, as she became impoverished from an inability to work. She died on 28 January 1924 in Warsaw and was buried in the Evangelical-Augsburg Cemetery, Warsaw.

When the government purchased Hewelke's school, they renamed the facility the Klementyna Hoffmanowa Lyceum and Secondary School IX, and it remained on Marszałkowska Street until it was partially destroyed in the Warsaw Uprising during 1944. In 1961, it was relocated to the site of the former Warsaw Pomological Garden bordered by Nowogrodzka, Emilii Plater, Wspólna, and Tytusa Chałubińskiego Streets of Warsaw.
