= Leopoldów =

Leopoldów may refer to the following places:

- Leopoldów, Łódź Voivodeship (central Poland)
- Leopoldów, Hrubieszów County in Lublin Voivodeship (east Poland)
- Leopoldów, Łęczna County in Lublin Voivodeship (east Poland)
- Leopoldów, Świętokrzyskie Voivodeship (south-central Poland)
- Leopoldów, Białobrzegi County in Masovian Voivodeship (east-central Poland)
- Leopoldów, Lipsko County in Masovian Voivodeship (east-central Poland)
