= Kaliszki, Łódź Voivodeship =

Kaliszki
- Village
- Location within Poland
- Coordinates: 51°44′55″N 20°9′44″E
- Country: Poland
- Voivodeship: Łódź
- County: Rawa
- Gmina: Rawa Mazowiecka

Kaliszki [kaˈliʂki] is a village in the administrative district of Gmina Rawa Mazowiecka, within Rawa County, Łódź Voivodeship, in central Poland.
