= Bogusławki Małe =

- Village
- Location within Poland
- Coordinates: 51°44′N 20°17′E
- Country: Poland
- Voivodeship: Łódź
- County: Rawa
- Gmina: Rawa Mazowiecka

Bogusławki Małe [bɔɡuˈswafki ˈmawɛ] is a village in the administrative district of Gmina Rawa Mazowiecka, within Rawa County, Łódź Voivodeship, in central Poland.
