= Ścieki, Łódź Voivodeship =

Ścieki
- Village
- Location within Poland
- Coordinates: 51°47′N 20°13′E
- Country: Poland
- Voivodeship: Łódź
- County: Rawa
- Gmina: Rawa Mazowiecka

Ścieki [ˈɕt͡ɕɛki] is a village in the administrative district of Gmina Rawa Mazowiecka, within Rawa County, Łódź Voivodeship, in central Poland.
