= Żydomice =

- Village
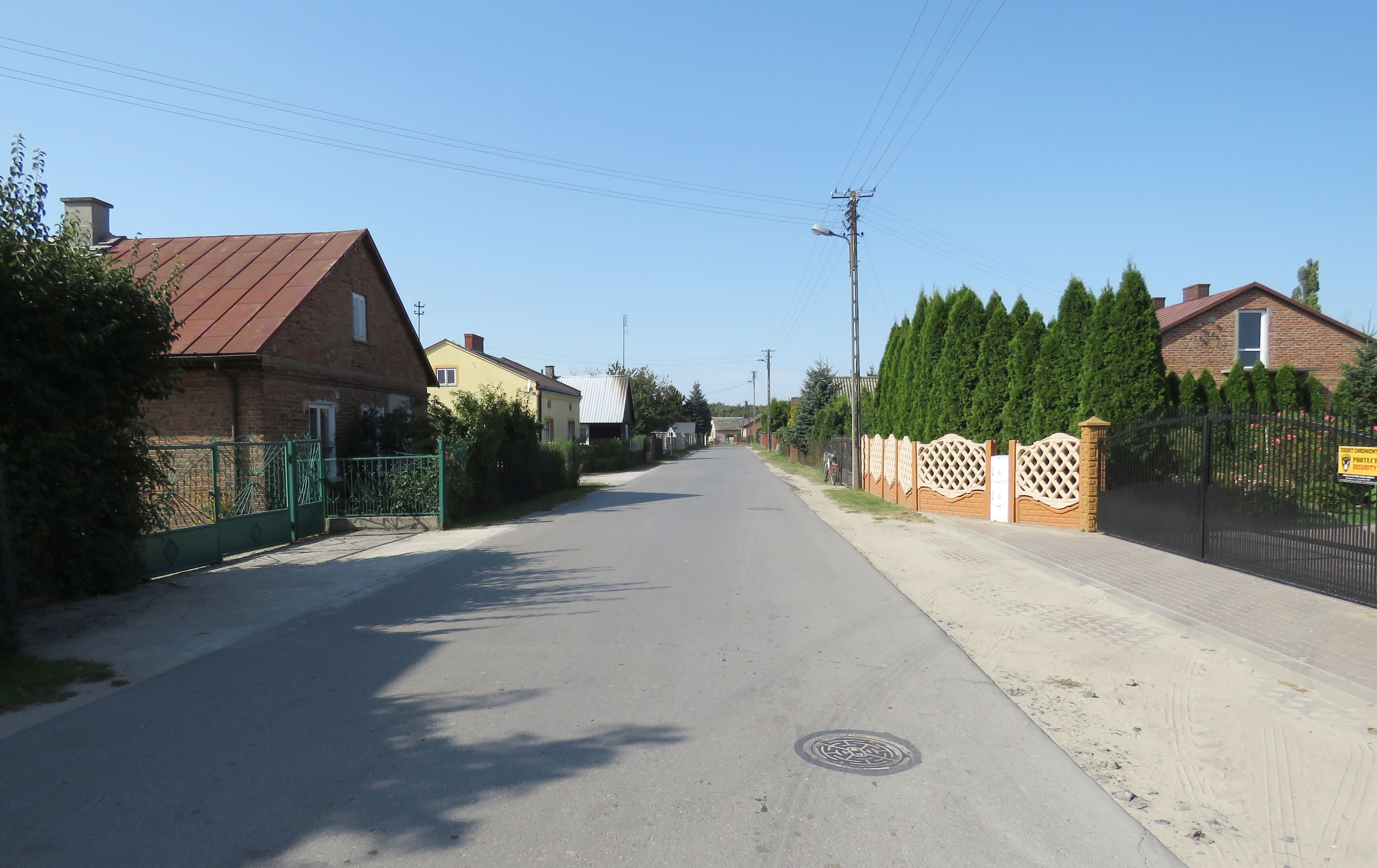
- Central part of the village

- Location within Poland
- Coordinates: 51°48′N 20°16′E
- Country: Poland
- Voivodeship: Łódź
- County: Rawa
- Gmina: Rawa Mazowiecka

Żydomice [ʐɨdɔˈmit͡sɛ] is a village in the administrative district of Gmina Rawa Mazowiecka, within Rawa County, Łódź Voivodeship, in central Poland.
