= Rossocha =

- Village
- Location within Poland
- Coordinates: 51°46′N 20°15′E
- Country: Poland
- Voivodeship: Łódź
- County: Rawa
- Gmina: Rawa Mazowiecka

Population (2005)
  - Total: 46

Rossocha [rɔsˈsɔxa] is a village in the administrative district of Gmina Rawa Mazowiecka, within Rawa County, Łódź Voivodeship, in central Poland.

Before World War II, it was part of a szlachta (Polish nobility) estate, belonging to Jan Czarnowski. The Czarnowski family palace was built shortly after World War I by Juliusz Nagórski.

After the war, part of the estate was turned into a biological and zoological research station.
