= Boguszyce, Rawa County =

Boguszyce
- Village
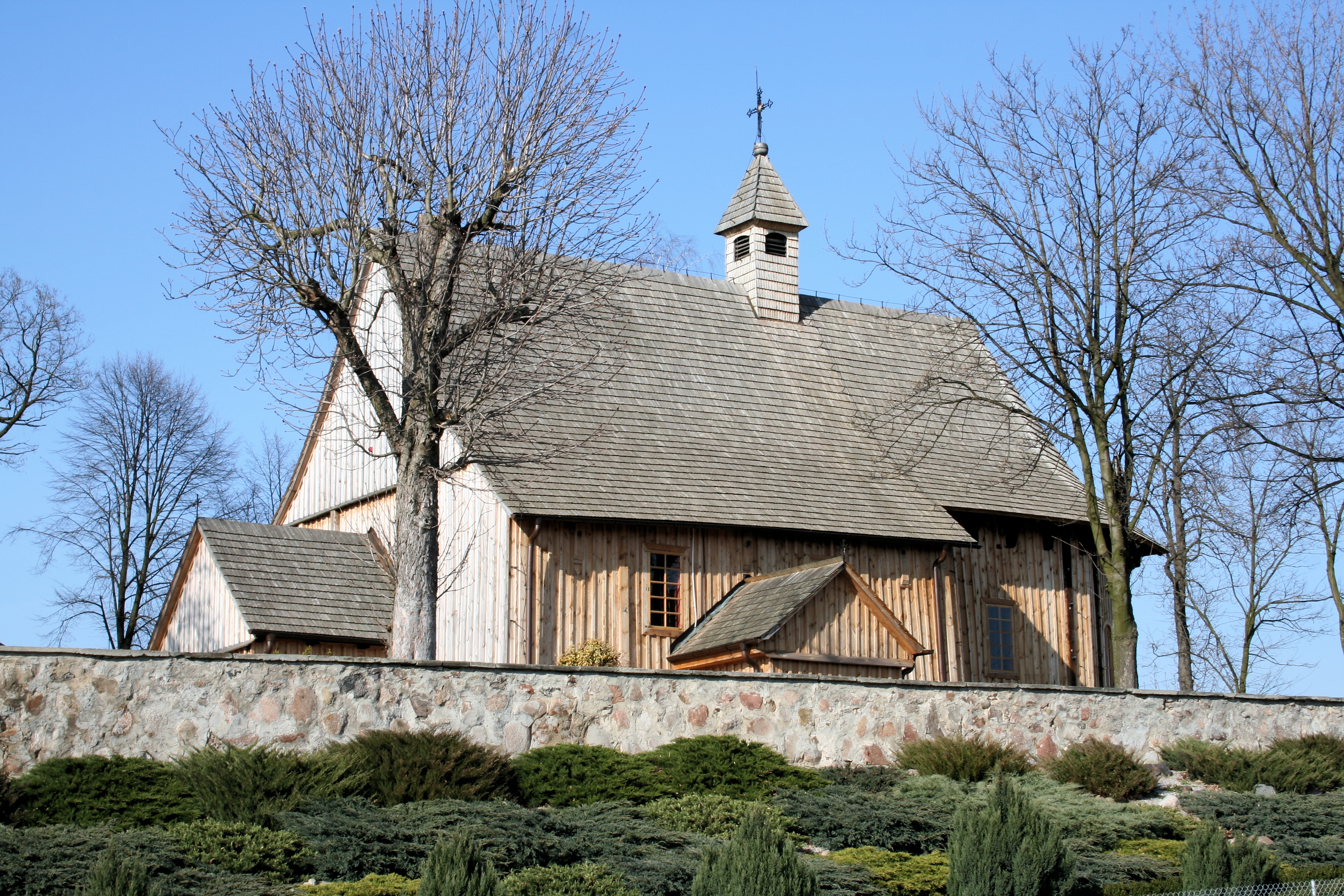
- Church of Saint Stanislaus

- Location within Poland
- Coordinates: 51°45′11″N 20°11′56″E
- Country: Poland
- Voivodeship: Łódź
- County: Rawa
- Gmina: Rawa Mazowiecka

Boguszyce [bɔɡuˈʂɨt͡sɛ] is a village in the administrative district of Gmina Rawa Mazowiecka, within Rawa County, Łódź Voivodeship, in central Poland.

There is a very precious wooden church from the 16th century (with polychromes and late Gothic polyptych in the main altar) in the village.
