= Zawady, Rawa County =

Zawady
- Village
- Location within Poland
- Coordinates: 51°45′32″N 20°9′28″E
- Country: Poland
- Voivodeship: Łódź
- County: Rawa
- Gmina: Rawa Mazowiecka

Zawady [zaˈvadɨ] is a village in the administrative district of Gmina Rawa Mazowiecka within Rawa County, Łódź Voivodeship, in central Poland.
