= Nowy Kurzeszyn =

- Village
- Location within Poland
- Coordinates: 51°49′51″N 20°16′32″E
- Country: Poland
- Voivodeship: Łódź
- County: Rawa
- Gmina: Rawa Mazowiecka

Nowy Kurzeszyn [ˈnɔvɨ kuˈʐɛʂɨn] is a village in the administrative district of Gmina Rawa Mazowiecka, within Rawa County, Łódź Voivodeship, in central Poland.
