= Stare Byliny =

- Village
- Location within Poland
- Coordinates: 51°44′16″N 20°9′20″E
- Country: Poland
- Voivodeship: Łódź
- County: Rawa
- Gmina: Rawa Mazowiecka

Stare Byliny [ˈstarɛ bɨˈlinɨ] is a village in the administrative district of Gmina Rawa Mazowiecka, within Rawa County, Łódź Voivodeship, in central Poland.

The name translates to "old heroic poems".
