= Jan Czarnowski =

Jan Franciszek Czarnowski (1883–1963) was a Polish nobleman of Grabie coat of arms who was Papal chamberlain to Pope Pius XI, and head of the Polish Priory of the Order of the Knights of Malta. He was married to Helena (Lunia) Kalinowska, and owned the Rossocha estate, where he commissioned a palace, built by Juliusz Nagórski.
