= Przewodowice =

- Village
- Location within Poland
- Coordinates: 51°49′43″N 20°19′19″E
- Country: Poland
- Voivodeship: Łódź
- County: Rawa
- Gmina: Rawa Mazowiecka
- Population (approx.): 120

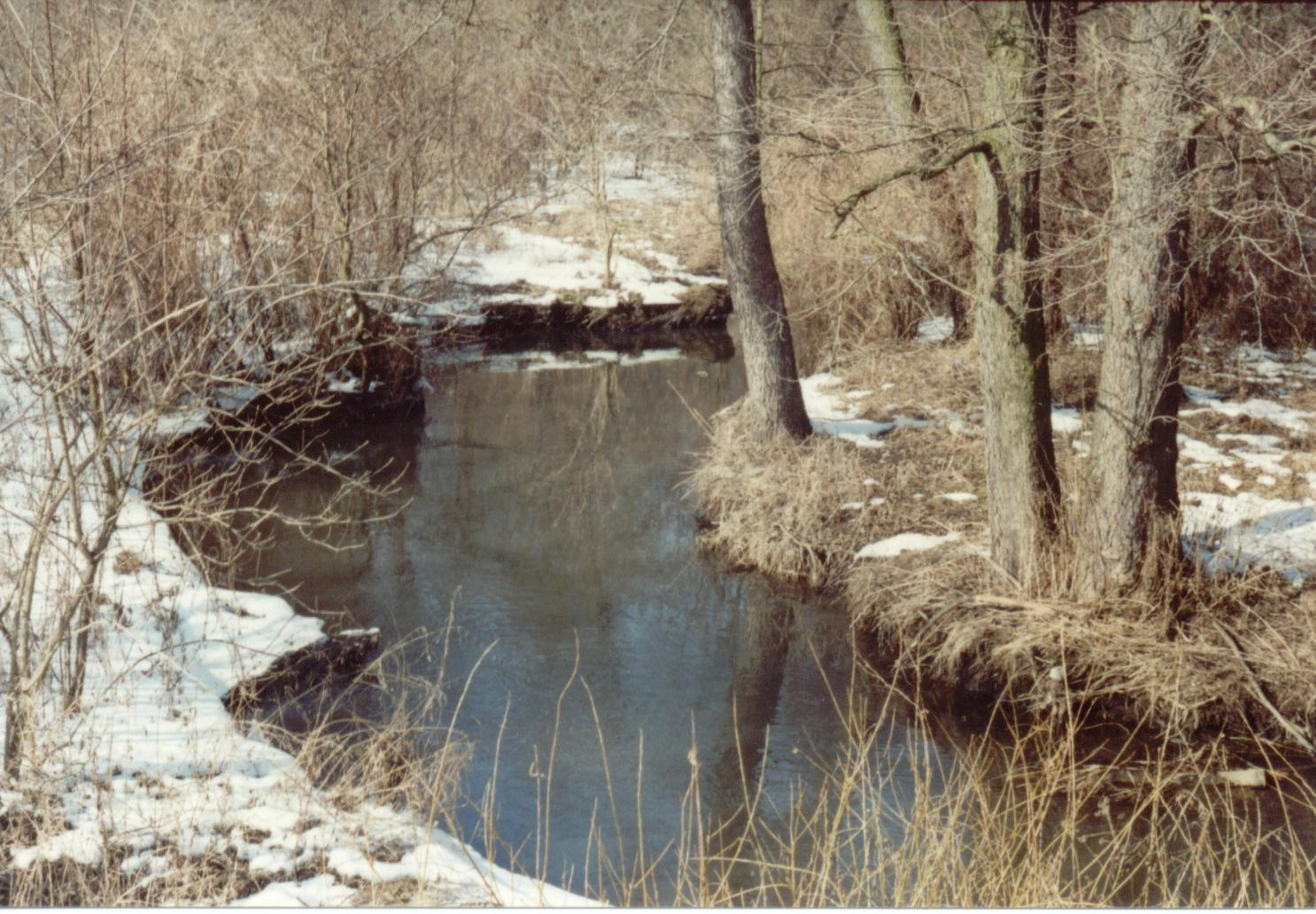
Białka River in Przewodowice

Przewodowice [pʂɛvɔdɔˈvit͡sɛ] is a village in the administrative district of Gmina Rawa Mazowiecka, within Rawa County, Łódź Voivodeship, in central Poland.

The village has an approximate population of 120. It is located on the Białka river (a tributary of the Rawka river).
