= Boguszyce Małe =

- Village
- Location within Poland
- Coordinates: 51°44′59″N 20°11′8″E
- Country: Poland
- Voivodeship: Łódź
- County: Rawa
- Gmina: Rawa Mazowiecka

Boguszyce Małe [bɔɡuˈʂɨt͡sɛ ˈmawɛ] is a village in the administrative district of Gmina Rawa Mazowiecka, within Rawa County, Łódź Voivodeship, in central Poland.
