= Gaj, Rawa County =

Gaj
- Village
- Location within Poland
- Coordinates: 51°49′27″N 20°15′21″E
- Country: Poland
- Voivodeship: Łódź
- County: Rawa
- Gmina: Rawa Mazowiecka
- Population: 22

Gaj [ɡai̯] is a village in the administrative district of Gmina Rawa Mazowiecka, within Rawa County, Łódź Voivodeship, in central Poland.
