= Goworek of Kurzeszyn =

14th-century Polish nobleman

Goworek of Kurzeszyn (Polish pronunciation: [ɡɔˈvɔ.rɛk ... kuˈʐɛ.ʂɘ̟n]; Polish: Goworek z Kurzeszyna) was a 14th-century nobleman and civil servant in the Duchy of Masovia. From 1374 to 1377, he was the standard-bearer of Rawa Land, and from 1381 to 1382, he was the cup-bearer of Rawa Land and Sochaczew Land.

== Biography ==
Goworek of Kurzeszyn lived in the 14th century. He came from the village of Kurzeszyn, and was part of the heraldic clan of Rawicz. From 1374 to 1377, he was the standard-bearer of Rawa Land, and from 1381 to 1382, he was the cup-bearer of Rawa Land and Sochaczew Land.

He was also the first known owner of the town of Solec (now part of Warsaw, Poland). In 1381, he sold it the inhabitant of Warsaw, named Piotr. The transaction was confirmed by duke Janusz I of Warsaw, in the document from 1382.

== Commemorations ==
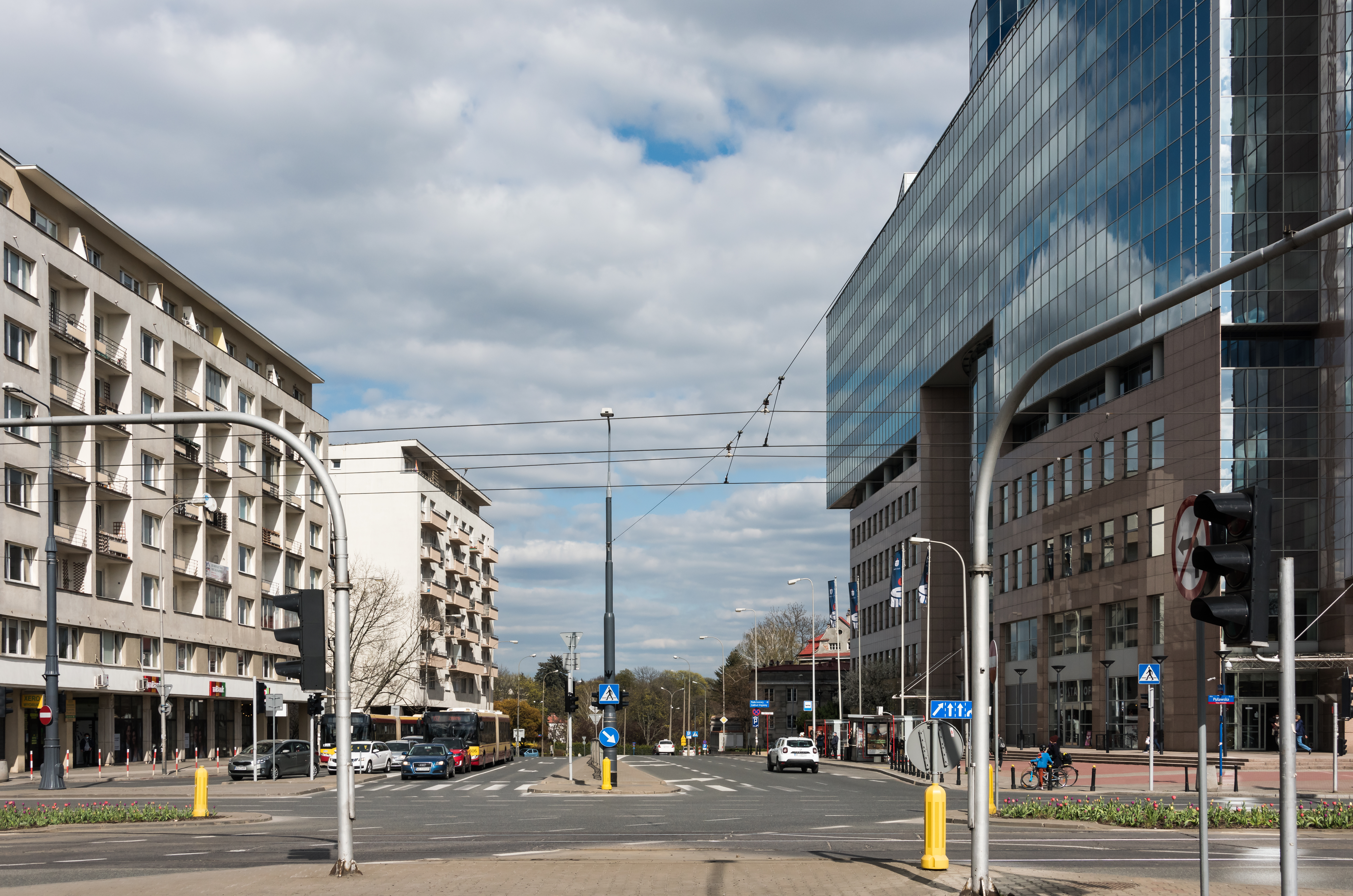
Goworka Street in Warsaw, Poland, named after Goworek of Kurzeszyn.

In 1961, a street in Warsaw was named after him. It is located in the district of Mokotów, and stretches from Spacerowa Street to Puławska Street.
