= Jakubów, Rawa County =

Jakubów
- Village
- Location within Poland
- Coordinates: 51°48′49″N 20°18′36″E
- Country: Poland
- Voivodeship: Łódź
- County: Rawa
- Gmina: Rawa Mazowiecka

Jakubów [jaˈkubuf] is a village in the administrative district of Gmina Rawa Mazowiecka, within Rawa County, Łódź Voivodeship, in central Poland.
