= Helenów, Rawa County =

Helenów
- Village
- Location within Poland
- Coordinates: 51°48′58″N 20°17′33″E
- Country: Poland
- Voivodeship: Łódź
- County: Rawa
- Gmina: Rawa Mazowiecka

Helenów [xɛˈlɛnuf] is a village in the administrative district of Gmina Rawa Mazowiecka, within Rawa County, Łódź Voivodeship, in central Poland.
