= Julianów, Rawa County =

Julianów
- Village
- Location within Poland
- Coordinates: 51°48′9″N 20°18′4″E
- Country: Poland
- Voivodeship: Łódź
- County: Rawa
- Gmina: Rawa Mazowiecka

Julianów [juˈljanuf] is a village in the administrative district of Gmina Rawa Mazowiecka, within Rawa County, Łódź Voivodeship, in central Poland.
