= Kaleń, Gmina Rawa Mazowiecka =

Kaleń
- Village
- Location within Poland
- Coordinates: 51°46′39″N 20°19′51″E
- Country: Poland
- Voivodeship: Łódź
- County: Rawa
- Gmina: Rawa Mazowiecka

Kaleń [ˈkalɛɲ] is a village in the administrative district of Gmina Rawa Mazowiecka, within Rawa County, Łódź Voivodeship, in central Poland.
