= Stara Wojska =

- Village
- Location within Poland
- Coordinates: 51°49′19″N 20°10′20″E
- Country: Poland
- Voivodeship: Łódź
- County: Rawa
- Gmina: Rawa Mazowiecka

Stara Wojska [ˈstara ˈvɔi̯ska] is a village in the administrative district of Gmina Rawa Mazowiecka, within Rawa County, Łódź Voivodeship, in central Poland.
