= Małgorzatów =

- Village
- Location within Poland
- Coordinates: 51°42′57″N 20°9′46″E
- Country: Poland
- Voivodeship: Łódź
- County: Rawa
- Gmina: Rawa Mazowiecka

Małgorzatów [mau̯ɡɔˈʐatuf] is a village in the administrative district of Gmina Rawa Mazowiecka, within Rawa County, Łódź Voivodeship, in central Poland.
