= Księża Wola =

- Village
- Location within Poland
- Coordinates: 51°43′32″N 20°12′0″E
- Country: Poland
- Voivodeship: Łódź
- County: Rawa
- Gmina: Rawa Mazowiecka

Księża Wola [ˈkɕɛ̃ʐa ˈvɔla] is a village in the administrative district of Gmina Rawa Mazowiecka, within Rawa County, Łódź Voivodeship, in central Poland.
