= Bogusławki Duże =

- Unincorporated village
- Location within Poland
- Coordinates: 51°44′N 20°18′E
- Country: Poland
- Voivodeship: Łódź
- County: Rawa
- Gmina: Rawa Mazowiecka

Bogusławki Duże [bɔɡuˈswafki ˈduʐɛ] is an unincorporated village in the administrative district of Gmina Rawa Mazowiecka, within Rawa County, Łódź Voivodeship, in central Poland.
