= Zarzecze, Rawa County =

Zarzecze
- Village
- Location within Poland
- Coordinates: 51°44′9″N 20°10′58″E
- Country: Poland
- Voivodeship: Łódź
- County: Rawa
- Gmina: Rawa Mazowiecka

Zarzecze [zaˈʐɛt͡ʂɛ] is a village in the administrative district of Gmina Rawa Mazowiecka, within Rawa County, Łódź Voivodeship, in central Poland.
