= Kurzeszynek =

- Village
- Location within Poland
- Coordinates: 51°50′4″N 20°17′11″E
- Country: Poland
- Voivodeship: Łódź
- County: Rawa
- Gmina: Rawa Mazowiecka

Kurzeszynek [kuʐɛˈʂɨnɛk] is a village in the administrative district of Gmina Rawa Mazowiecka, within Rawa County, Łódź Voivodeship, in central Poland.
