= Konopnica, Rawa County =

Konopnica
- Village
- Location within Poland
- Coordinates: 51°47′14″N 20°17′27″E
- Country: Poland
- Voivodeship: Łódź
- County: Rawa
- Gmina: Rawa Mazowiecka
- Population: 430

Konopnica [kɔnɔpˈnit͡sa] is a village in the administrative district of Gmina Rawa Mazowiecka, within Rawa County, Łódź Voivodeship, in central Poland.
