= Świnice, Łódź Voivodeship =

Świnice
- Village
- Location within Poland
- Coordinates: 51°43′20″N 20°17′12″E
- Country: Poland
- Voivodeship: Łódź
- County: Rawa
- Gmina: Rawa Mazowiecka

Świnice [ɕfiˈnit͡sɛ] is a village in the administrative district of Gmina Rawa Mazowiecka, within Rawa County, Łódź Voivodeship, in central Poland.
