= Wołucza =

- Village
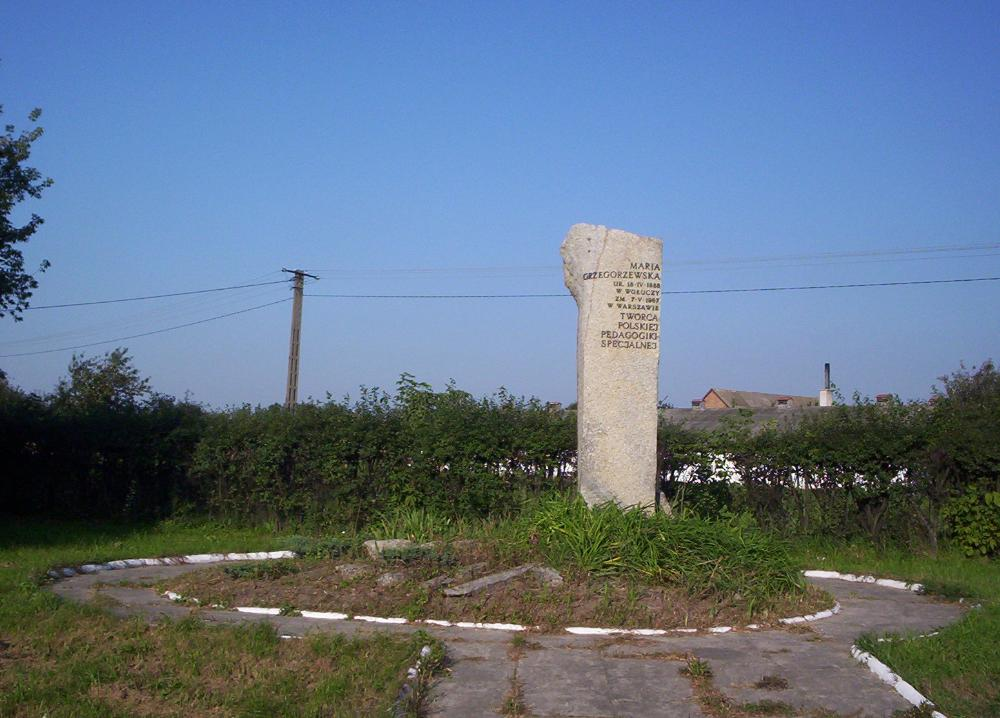
- Maria Grzegorzewska monument

- Location within Poland
- Coordinates: 51°51′N 20°17′E
- Country: Poland
- Voivodeship: Łódź
- County: Rawa
- Gmina: Rawa Mazowiecka

Wołucza [vɔˈwut͡ʂa] is a village in the administrative district of Gmina Rawa Mazowiecka, within Rawa County, Łódź Voivodeship, in central Poland.

Educator Maria Grzegorzewska was born in the village.
