= Huta Wałowska =

- Village
- Location within Poland
- Coordinates: 51°48′27″N 20°11′55″E
- Country: Poland
- Voivodeship: Łódź
- County: Rawa
- Gmina: Rawa Mazowiecka
- Population: 108

Huta Wałowska (Polish pronunciation: [ˈxuta vaˈwɔfska]) is a village in the administrative district of Gmina Rawa Mazowiecka, within Rawa County, Łódź Voivodeship, in central Poland.
