= Julianów Raducki =

- Village
- Location within Poland
- Coordinates: 51°50′14″N 20°18′35″E
- Country: Poland
- Voivodeship: Łódź
- County: Rawa
- Gmina: Rawa Mazowiecka
- Population: 40

Julianów Raducki [juˈljanuf raˈdut͡ski] is a village in the administrative district of Gmina Rawa Mazowiecka, within Rawa County, Łódź Voivodeship, in central Poland.
