= Niwna =

- Village
- Location within Poland
- Coordinates: 51°48′26″N 20°15′22″E
- Country: Poland
- Voivodeship: Łódź
- County: Rawa
- Gmina: Rawa Mazowiecka
- Population (approx.): 300

Niwna [ˈnivna] is a village in the administrative district of Gmina Rawa Mazowiecka, within Rawa County, Łódź Voivodeship, in central Poland.

The village has an approximate population of 300.
