= Dziurdzioły =

- Village
- Location within Poland
- Coordinates: 51°44′N 20°10′E
- Country: Poland
- Voivodeship: Łódź
- County: Rawa
- Gmina: Rawa Mazowiecka

Dziurdzioły [d͡ʑurˈd͡ʑɔwɨ] is a village in the administrative district of Gmina Rawa Mazowiecka, within Rawa County, Łódź Voivodeship, in central Poland.
