= Janolin =

- Village
- Location within Poland
- Coordinates: 51°49′N 20°12′E
- Country: Poland
- Voivodeship: Łódź
- County: Rawa
- Gmina: Rawa Mazowiecka

Janolin [jaˈnɔlin] is a village in the administrative district of Gmina Rawa Mazowiecka, within Rawa County, Łódź Voivodeship, in central Poland.

From 1975 to 1998, Janolin was administratively part of the Skierniewice Voivodeship.
