= Matyldów, Łódź Voivodeship =

Matyldów
- Village
- Location within Poland
- Coordinates: 51°44′12″N 20°16′16″E
- Country: Poland
- Voivodeship: Łódź
- County: Rawa
- Gmina: Rawa Mazowiecka

Matyldów [maˈtɨlduf] is a village in the administrative district of Gmina Rawa Mazowiecka, within Rawa County, Łódź Voivodeship, in central Poland.
