= Lutkówka, Łódź Voivodeship =

Lutkówka
- Village
- Location within Poland
- Coordinates: 51°48′47″N 20°11′14″E
- Country: Poland
- Voivodeship: Łódź
- County: Rawa
- Gmina: Rawa Mazowiecka

Lutkówka [lutˈkufka] is a village in the administrative district of Gmina Rawa Mazowiecka, within Rawa County, Łódź Voivodeship, in central Poland.
