= Głuchówek, Łódź Voivodeship =

Głuchówek
- Village
- Location within Poland
- Coordinates: 51°44′52″N 20°16′31″E
- Country: Poland
- Voivodeship: Łódź
- County: Rawa
- Gmina: Rawa Mazowiecka

Głuchówek [ɡwuˈxuvɛk] is a village in the administrative district of Gmina Rawa Mazowiecka, within Rawa County, Łódź Voivodeship, in central Poland.
