= Stary Dwór, Łódź Voivodeship =

Stary Dwór
- Village
- Location within Poland
- Coordinates: 51°48′27″N 20°12′55″E
- Country: Poland
- Voivodeship: Łódź
- County: Rawa
- Gmina: Rawa Mazowiecka
- Population: 50

Stary Dwór [ˈstarɨ ˈdvur] is a village in the administrative district of Gmina Rawa Mazowiecka, within Rawa County, Łódź Voivodeship, in central Poland.
