= Pokrzywna, Łódź Voivodeship =

Pokrzywna
- Village
- Location within Poland
- Coordinates: 51°48′51″N 20°14′50″E
- Country: Poland
- Voivodeship: Łódź
- County: Rawa
- Gmina: Rawa Mazowiecka
- Population: 20

Pokrzywna [pɔˈkʂɨvna] is a village in the administrative district of Gmina Rawa Mazowiecka, within Rawa County, Łódź Voivodeship, in central Poland.
