= Gmina Rawa Mazowiecka =

Gmina Rawa Mazowiecka Rawa Mazowiecka Commune
- Gmina
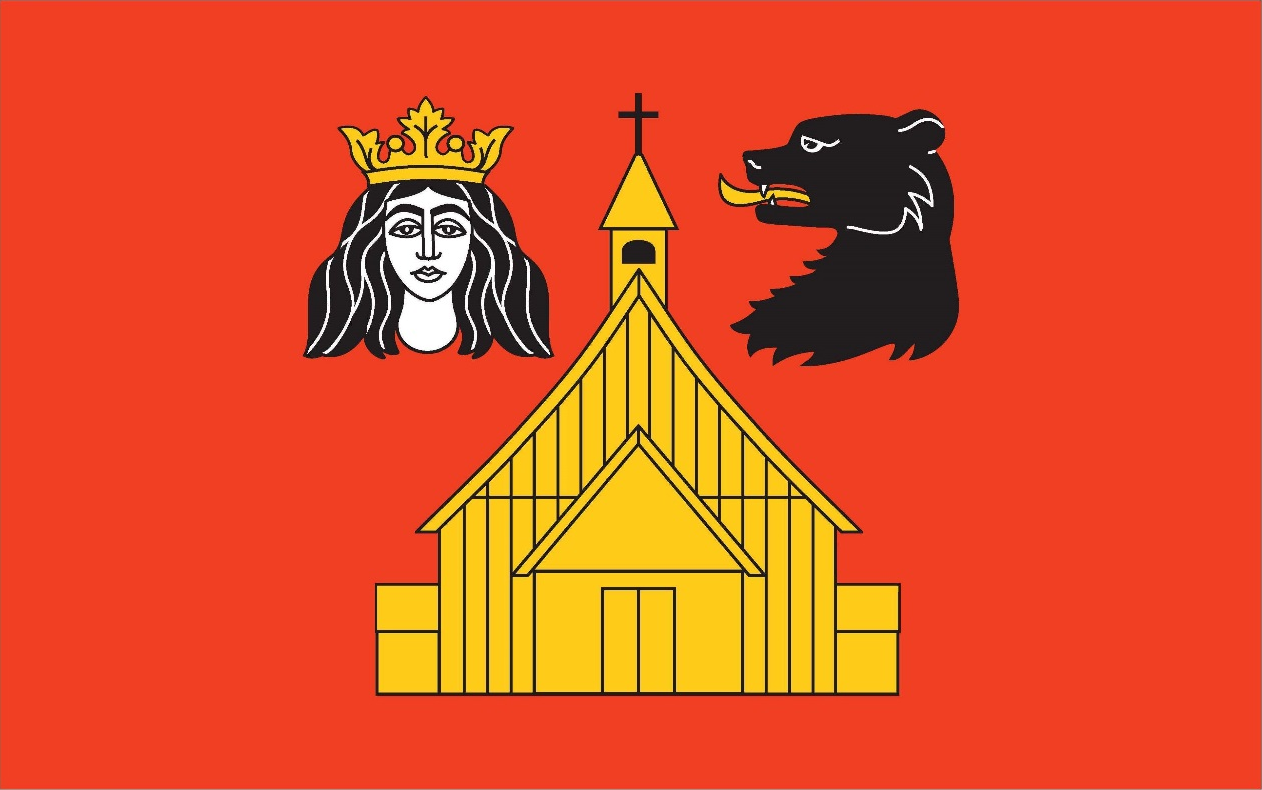
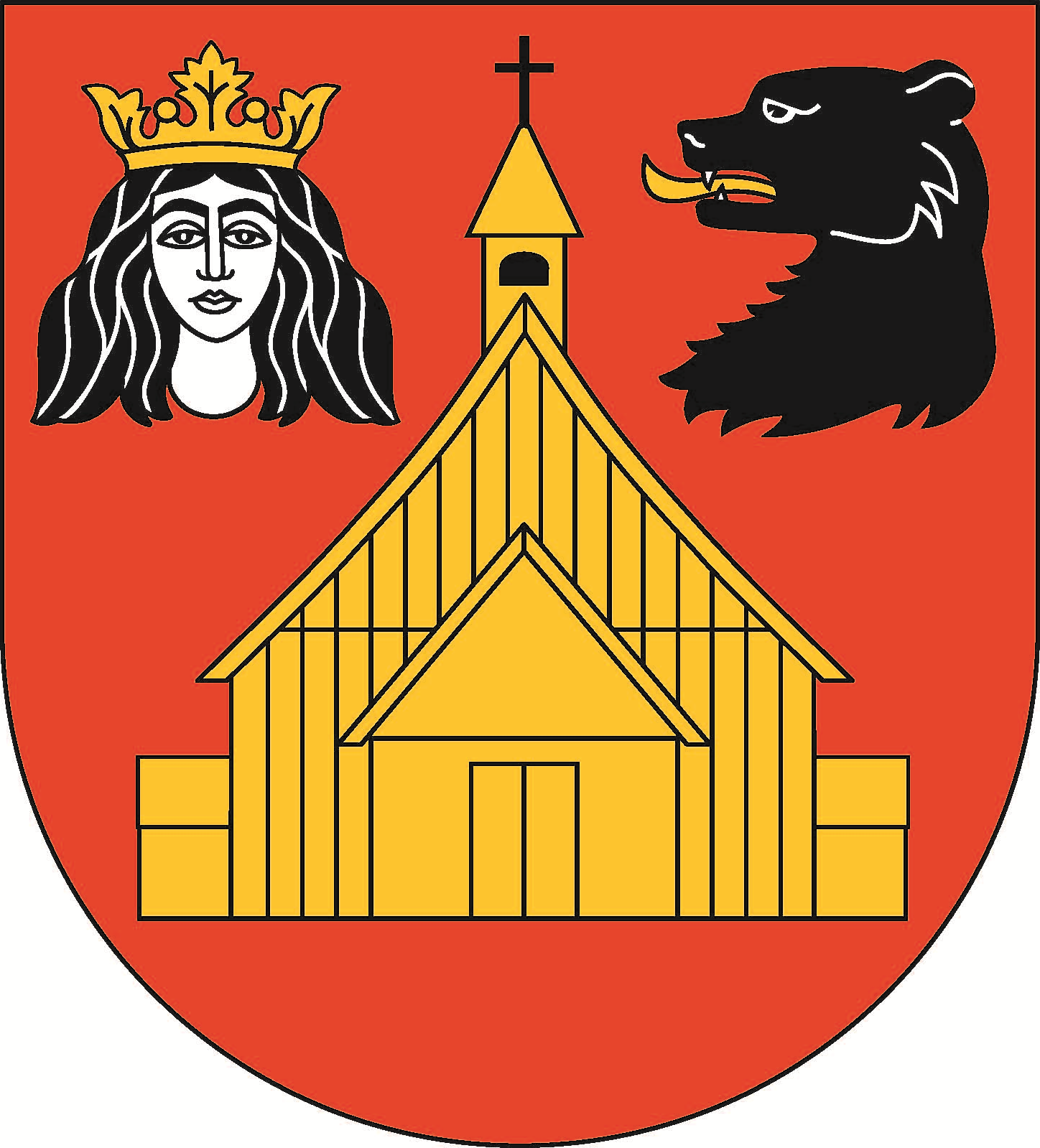
- Flag Coat of arms
- Interactive map of Gmina Rawa Mazowiecka
- Coordinates (Rawa Mazowiecka): 51°46′N 20°15′E
- Country: Poland
- Voivodeship: Łódź
- County: Rawa
- Seat: Rawa Mazowiecka

Area
  - Total: 163.98 km^{2} (63.31 sq mi)

Population (2006)
  - Total: 8,573
  - Density: 52.28/km^{2} (135.4/sq mi)
- Website: https://www.rawam.ug.gov.pl/

Gmina Rawa Mazowiecka is a rural gmina (administrative district) in Rawa County, Łódź Voivodeship, in central Poland. Its seat is the town of Rawa Mazowiecka, although the town is not part of the territory of the gmina.

The gmina covers an area of 163.98 square kilometres (63.3 sq mi), and as of 2006 its total population is 8,573.

== Villages ==
The Gmina is made up of 54 villages, of which 38 are incorporated villages and 16 are unincorporated villages. Gmina Rawa Mazowiecka contains the villages and settlements of Bogusławki Duże, Bogusławki Małe, Boguszyce, Boguszyce Małe, Byszewice, Chrusty, Dziurdzioły, Gaj, Garłów, Głuchówek, Helenów, Huta Wałowska, Jakubów, Janolin, Julianów, Julianów Raducki, Kaleń, Kaliszki, Konopnica, Księża Wola, Kurzeszyn, Kurzeszynek, Leopoldów, Linków, Lutkówka, Małgorzatów, Matyldów, Niwna, Nowa Wojska, Nowy Głuchówek, Nowy Kurzeszyn, Pasieka Wałowska, Podlas, Pokrzywna, Przewodowice, Pukinin, Rogówiec, Rossocha, Ścieki, Soszyce, Stara Rossocha, Stara Wojska, Stare Byliny, Stary Dwór, Świnice, Wałowice, Wilkowice, Wołucza, Zagórze, Zarzecze, Zawady, Zielone and Żydomice.

== Neighbouring gminas ==
Gmina Rawa Mazowiecka is bordered by the town of Rawa Mazowiecka and by the gminas of Biała Rawska, Cielądz, Czerniewice, Głuchów, Nowy Kawęczyn, Regnów, Skierniewice and Żelechlinek.
