= Kurzeszyn =

- Village
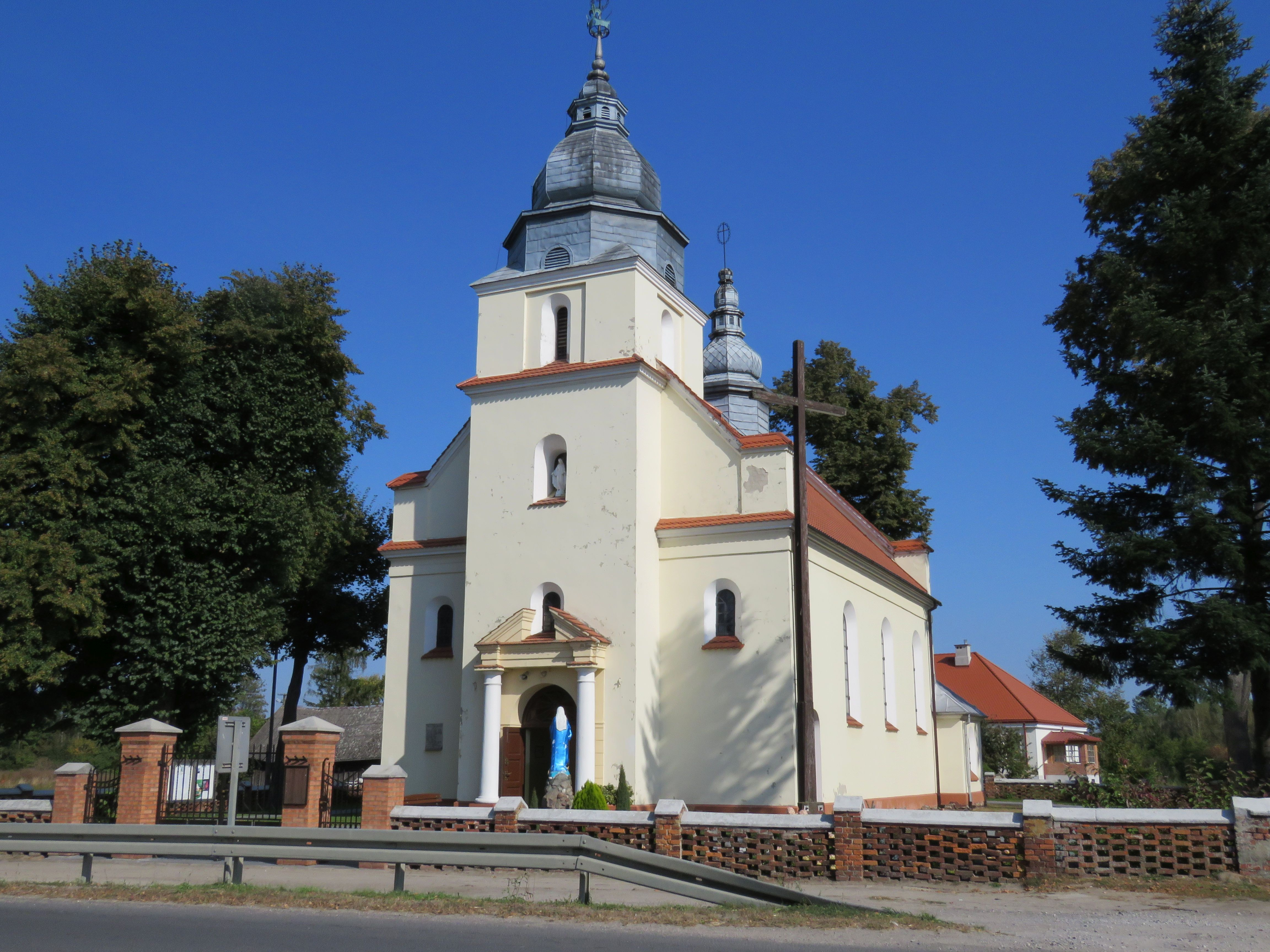
- Church of the Blessed Virgin Mary Queen of Poland

- Location within Poland
- Coordinates: 51°49′49″N 20°16′36″E
- Country: Poland
- Voivodeship: Łódź
- County: Rawa
- Gmina: Rawa Mazowiecka

Population (approx.)
  - Total: 650

Kurzeszyn [kuˈʐɛʂɨn] is a village in the administrative district of Gmina Rawa Mazowiecka, within Rawa County, Łódź Voivodeship, in central Poland.

The village has an approximate population of 650.

== Notable people from the village ==
- Goworek of Kurzeszyn, 14th century statesman
