= Wałowice, Łódź Voivodeship =

Wałowice
- Village
- Location within Poland
- Coordinates: 51°47′51″N 20°14′0″E
- Country: Poland
- Voivodeship: Łódź
- County: Rawa
- Gmina: Rawa Mazowiecka

Wałowice [vawɔˈvit͡sɛ] is a village in the administrative district of Gmina Rawa Mazowiecka, within Rawa County, Łódź Voivodeship, in central Poland.
