= Podlas, Łódź Voivodeship =

Podlas
- Village
- Location within Poland
- Coordinates: 51°44′23″N 20°14′13″E
- Country: Poland
- Voivodeship: Łódź
- County: Rawa
- Gmina: Rawa Mazowiecka

Podlas [ˈpɔdlas] is a village in the administrative district of Gmina Rawa Mazowiecka, within Rawa County, Łódź Voivodeship, in central Poland.
