= Leopoldów, Łódź Voivodeship =

Leopoldów
- Village
- Location within Poland
- Coordinates: 51°43′22″N 20°14′22″E
- Country: Poland
- Voivodeship: Łódź
- County: Rawa
- Gmina: Rawa Mazowiecka

Leopoldów [lɛɔˈpɔlduf] is a village in the administrative district of Gmina Rawa Mazowiecka, within Rawa County, Łódź Voivodeship, in central Poland.
