= Lucjan Zarzecki =

Polish mathematician

- Born: 1873
- Died: 1925 (aged 51–52)
- Scientific career
- Fields: Mathematics; Pedagogy

Lucjan Zarzecki (1873–1925) was a Polish pedagogue and mathematician, a co-originator of national education concept. His area of study was general didactics and didactics of mathematics.

Member of the Polska Macierz Szkolna, professor and director of Pedagogics Department of the Wolna Wszechnica Polska in Warsaw.

== Notable works ==
- Charakter jako cel wychowania (1918)
- Nauczanie matematyki początkowej vol. 1–3 (1919–1920)
- Dydaktyka ogólna, czyli kształcenie charakteru przez nauczanie (1920)
- Wstęp do pedagogiki (1922)
- Wychowanie narodowe (1926)
