= Rylsk =

Rylsk may refer to:

- Rylsk, Russia, a town in Kursk Oblast, Russia
- Rylsk, Łódź Voivodeship, a village in Łódź Voivodeship, Poland
- Rylsk Duży, Poland
- Rylsk Mały, Poland
