= Galiny =

Galiny may refer to:

- Galiny, Łódź Voivodeship (central Poland)
- Galiny, Gmina Bartoszyce in Warmian-Masurian Voivodeship (north Poland)
- Galiny, Gmina Górowo Iławeckie in Warmian-Masurian Voivodeship (north Poland)
