= Wólka Lesiewska =

- Village
- Location within Poland
- Coordinates: 51°47′44″N 20°23′14″E
- Country: Poland
- Voivodeship: Łódź
- County: Rawa
- Gmina: Biała Rawska

Wólka Lesiewska [ˈvulka lɛˈɕɛfska] is a village in the administrative district of Gmina Biała Rawska, within Rawa County, Łódź Voivodeship, in central Poland.
