= Niemirowice =

- Village
- Location within Poland
- Coordinates: 51°51′N 20°30′E
- Country: Poland
- Voivodeship: Łódź
- County: Rawa
- Gmina: Biała Rawska

Niemirowice [ɲɛmʲirɔˈvʲit͡sɛ] is a village in the administrative district of Gmina Biała Rawska, within Rawa County, Łódź Voivodeship, in central Poland.

The locale's designation derives from the Slavic given name Niemir. Settlement occurs in 1404 as Nyemyrouicze. In the years 1975-1998 the village administratively belonged to the Skierniewice Voivodeship.
