= Gośliny =

- Village
- Location within Poland
- Coordinates: 51°45′59″N 20°32′8″E
- Country: Poland
- Voivodeship: Łódź
- County: Rawa
- Gmina: Biała Rawska
- Elevation: 180 m (590 ft)
- Population (approx.): 120

Gośliny [ɡɔˈɕlʲinɨ] is a village in the administrative district of Gmina Biała Rawska, within Rawa County, Łódź Voivodeship, in central Poland.

The village has an approximate population of 120.
