= Antoninów, Rawa County =

Antoninów
- Village
- Location within Poland
- Coordinates: 51°51′15″N 20°25′14″E
- Country: Poland
- Voivodeship: Łódź
- County: Rawa
- Gmina: Biała Rawska

Antoninów [antɔˈɲinuf] is a village in the administrative district of Gmina Biała Rawska, within Rawa County, Łódź Voivodeship, in central Poland.
