= Grabice =

Grabice may refer to the following places:

- Grabice, Łódź Voivodeship (central Poland)
- Grabice, Lubusz Voivodeship (west Poland)
- Grabice, Opole Voivodeship (south-west Poland)
