= Sanogoszcz =

- Village
- Location within Poland
- Coordinates: 51°41′55″N 20°18′19″E
- Country: Poland
- Voivodeship: Łódź
- County: Rawa
- Gmina: Cielądz
- Population (approx.): 170

Sanogoszcz [saˈnɔɡɔʂt͡ʂ] is a village in the administrative district of Gmina Cielądz, within Rawa County, Łódź Voivodeship, in central Poland.

The village has an approximate population of 170.
