= Niemgłowy =

- Village
- Location within Poland
- Coordinates: 51°42′7″N 20°22′39″E
- Country: Poland
- Voivodeship: Łódź
- County: Rawa
- Gmina: Cielądz

Niemgłowy [ɲɛmˈɡwɔvɨ] is a village in the administrative district of Gmina Cielądz, within Rawa County, Łódź Voivodeship, in central Poland.
