= Konstantynów, Rawa County =

Konstantynów
- Village
- Location within Poland
- Coordinates: 51°45′33″N 20°32′38″E
- Country: Poland
- Voivodeship: Łódź
- County: Rawa
- Gmina: Biała Rawska

Konstantynów [kɔnstanˈtɨnuf] is a village in the administrative district of Gmina Biała Rawska, within Rawa County, Łódź Voivodeship, in central Poland.
