= Rylsky =

Rylsky (masculine), Rylskaya (feminine), or Rylskoye (neuter) may refer to:

People

- Maksym Rylsky (1895–1964), Ukrainian-Soviet poet
- Yakov Rylsky (1928–1999), Soviet Olympic and world champion sabre fencer

Places

- Rylsky District, a district of Kursk Oblast, Russia
- Rylskoye, a rural locality (a village) in Tula Oblast, Russia

== See also ==
- Rilski (disambiguation)
- Rylsk (disambiguation)
