= Łaszczyn =

Łaszczyn may refer to the following places:

- Łaszczyn, Greater Poland Voivodeship (west-central Poland)
- Łaszczyn, Łódź Voivodeship (central Poland)
- Łaszczyn, Masovian Voivodeship (east-central Poland)
