= Narty =

Narty may refer to the following places:

- Narty, Włocławek County in Kuyavian-Pomeranian Voivodeship (north-central Poland)
- Narty, Rypin County in Kuyavian-Pomeranian Voivodeship (north-central Poland)
- Narty, Łódź Voivodeship (central Poland)
- Narty, Radom County in Masovian Voivodeship (east-central Poland)
- Narty, Sochaczew County in Masovian Voivodeship (east-central Poland)
- Narty, Warmian-Masurian Voivodeship (north Poland)
