= Kazimierzów, Rawa County =

Kazimierzów
- Village
- Location within Poland
- Coordinates: 51°46′27″N 20°21′33″E
- Country: Poland
- Voivodeship: Łódź
- County: Rawa
- Gmina: Regnów
- Population: 160

Kazimierzów [kaʑiˈmjɛʐuf] is a village in the administrative district of Gmina Regnów, within Rawa County, Łódź Voivodeship, in central Poland.
