= Rokszyce =

Rokszyce may refer to the following places:

- Rokszyce, Piotrków County in Łódź Voivodeship (central Poland)
- Rokszyce, Rawa County in Łódź Voivodeship (central Poland)
- Rokszyce, Subcarpathian Voivodeship (south-east Poland)
