= Nowy Regnów =

- Village
- Location within Poland
- Coordinates: 51°45′7″N 20°23′22″E
- Country: Poland
- Voivodeship: Łódź
- County: Rawa
- Gmina: Regnów

Nowy Regnów [ˈnɔvɨ ˈrɛɡnuf] is a village in the administrative district of Gmina Regnów, within Rawa County, Łódź Voivodeship, in central Poland.
