= Kuczyzna =

- Village
- Location within Poland
- Coordinates: 51°38′46″N 20°21′59″E
- Country: Poland
- Voivodeship: Łódź
- County: Rawa
- Gmina: Cielądz

Kuczyzna [kuˈt͡ʂɨzna] is a village in the administrative district of Gmina Cielądz, within Rawa County, Łódź Voivodeship, in central Poland.
