= Wólka Babska =

- Village
- Location within Poland
- Coordinates: 51°49′51″N 20°21′49″E
- Country: Poland
- Voivodeship: Łódź
- County: Rawa
- Gmina: Biała Rawska
- Population (approx.): 140

Wólka Babska [ˈvulka ˈbapska] is a village in the administrative district of Gmina Biała Rawska, within Rawa County, Łódź Voivodeship, in central Poland.
