= Biała Wieś =

Biała Wieś refers to the following places in Poland:

- Biała Wieś, Greater Poland Voivodeship
- Biała Wieś, Łódź Voivodeship
