= Stanisławów, Rawa County =

Stanisławów
- Village
- Location within Poland
- Coordinates: 51°48′26″N 20°34′06″E
- Country: Poland
- Voivodeship: Łódź
- County: Rawa
- Gmina: Biała Rawska

Stanisławów [staɲiˈswavuf] is a village in the administrative district of Gmina Biała Rawska, within Rawa County, Łódź Voivodeship, in central Poland.
