= Zakrzew, Rawa County =

Zakrzew
- Village
- Location within Poland
- Coordinates: 51°49′38″N 20°28′33″E
- Country: Poland
- Voivodeship: Łódź
- County: Rawa
- Gmina: Biała Rawska

Zakrzew [ˈzakʂɛf] is a village in the administrative district of Gmina Biała Rawska, within Rawa County, Łódź Voivodeship, in central Poland.
