= Jelitów, Łódź Voivodeship =

Jelitów
- Village
- Location within Poland
- Coordinates: 51°48′39″N 20°21′4″E
- Country: Poland
- Voivodeship: Łódź
- County: Rawa
- Gmina: Biała Rawska
- Elevation: 180 m (590 ft)
- Population (approx.): 120

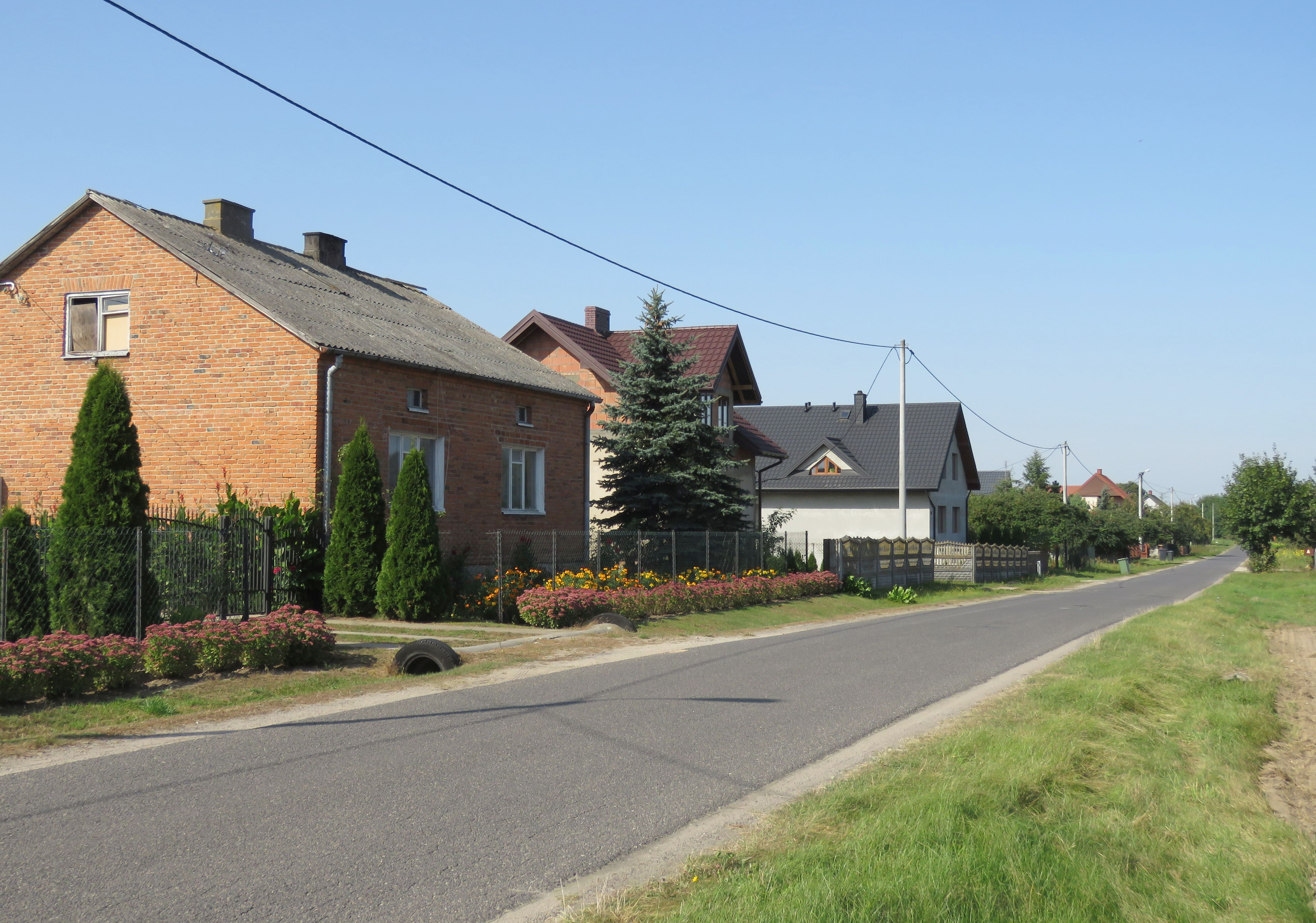
Jelitów, Biała Rawska commune

Jelitów [jɛˈlʲituf] is a village in the administrative district of Gmina Biała Rawska, within Rawa County, Łódź Voivodeship, in central Poland.

The village has an approximate population of 120.
