= Pągów, Rawa County =

Pągów
- Village
- Location within Poland
- Coordinates: 51°46′20″N 20°25′34″E
- Country: Poland
- Voivodeship: Łódź
- County: Rawa
- Gmina: Biała Rawska

Pągów [ˈpɔŋɡuf] is a village in the administrative district of Gmina Biała Rawska, within Rawa County, Łódź Voivodeship, in central Poland.
