= Józefów, Rawa County =

Józefów
- Village
- Location within Poland
- Coordinates: 51°47′30″N 20°34′9″E
- Country: Poland
- Voivodeship: Łódź
- County: Rawa
- Gmina: Biała Rawska

Józefów (Polish pronunciation: [juˈzɛfuf]) is a village in the administrative district of Gmina Biała Rawska, within Rawa County, Łódź Voivodeship, in central Poland.
