= Brzozówka, Rawa County =

Brzozówka
- Village
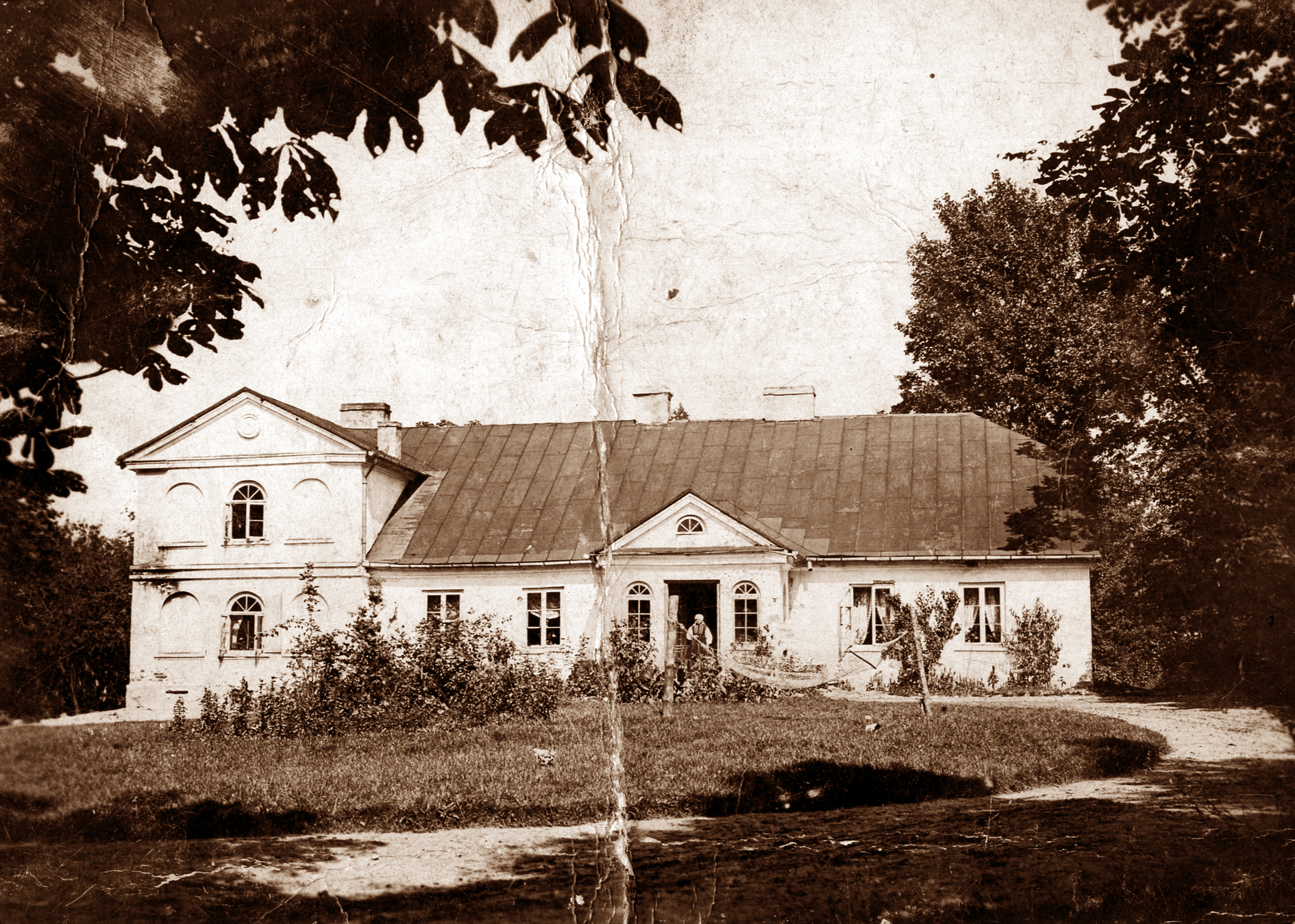
- Brzozówka in 1905

- Location within Poland
- Coordinates: 51°41′22″N 20°18′40″E
- Country: Poland
- Voivodeship: Łódź
- County: Rawa
- Gmina: Cielądz

Brzozówka [bʐɔˈzufka] is a village in the administrative district of Gmina Cielądz, within Rawa County, Łódź Voivodeship, in central Poland.
