= Janów, Rawa County =

Janów
- Village
- Location within Poland
- Coordinates: 51°45′54″N 20°34′43″E
- Country: Poland
- Voivodeship: Łódź
- County: Rawa
- Gmina: Biała Rawska
- Population: 50

Janów [ˈjanuf] is a village in the administrative district of Gmina Biała Rawska, within Rawa County, Łódź Voivodeship, in central Poland.
