= Mała Wieś, Rawa County =

Mała Wieś
- Village
- Location within Poland
- Coordinates: 51°40′50″N 20°19′39″E
- Country: Poland
- Voivodeship: Łódź
- County: Rawa
- Gmina: Cielądz

Mała Wieś [ˈmawa ˈvjɛɕ] is a village in the administrative district of Gmina Cielądz, within Rawa County, Łódź Voivodeship, in central Poland.
