= Szwejki Małe =

- Village
- Location within Poland
- Coordinates: 51°45′39″N 20°29′25″E
- Country: Poland
- Voivodeship: Łódź
- County: Rawa
- Gmina: Biała Rawska

Szwejki Małe [ˈʂfɛi̯ki ˈmawɛ] is a village in the administrative district of Gmina Biała Rawska, within Rawa County, Łódź Voivodeship, in central Poland.
