= Chrząszczew, Łódź Voivodeship =

Chrząszczew
- Village
- Location within Poland
- Coordinates: 51°50′4″N 20°25′58″E
- Country: Poland
- Voivodeship: Łódź
- County: Rawa
- Gmina: Biała Rawska
- Population (approx.): 340

Chrząszczew [ˈxʂɔ̃ʂt͡ʂɛf] is a village in the administrative district of Gmina Biała Rawska, within Rawa County, Łódź Voivodeship, in central Poland.

The village has an approximate population of 340.
