= Gołyń =

- Village
- Location within Poland
- Coordinates: 51°51′28″N 20°24′29″E
- Country: Poland
- Voivodeship: Łódź
- County: Rawa
- Gmina: Biała Rawska
- Elevation: 190 m (620 ft)
- Population (approx.): 150

Gołyń [ˈɡɔwɨɲ] is a village in the administrative district of Gmina Biała Rawska, within Rawa County, Łódź Voivodeship, in central Poland.

The village has an approximate population of 150.

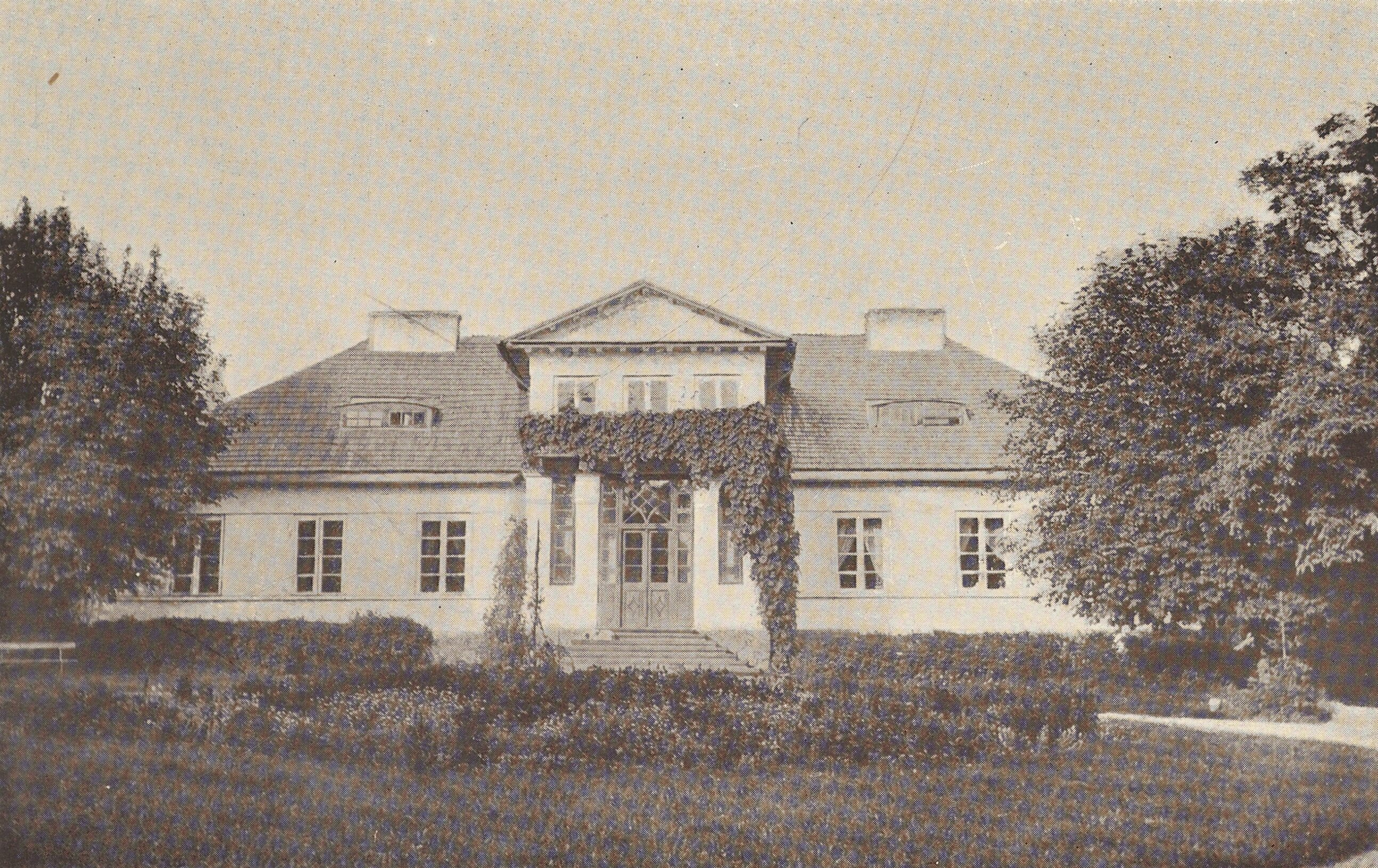
Manor house before 1911
