= Komorów, Rawa County =

Komorów
- Village
- Location within Poland
- Coordinates: 51°44′33″N 20°19′29″E
- Country: Poland
- Voivodeship: Łódź
- County: Rawa
- Gmina: Cielądz

Komorów [kɔˈmɔruf] is a village in the administrative district of Gmina Cielądz, within Rawa County, Łódź Voivodeship, in central Poland.
