= Szczuki =

Szczuki may refer to the following places:

- Szczuki, Łódź Voivodeship (central Poland)
- Szczuki, Masovian Voivodeship (east-central Poland)
- Szczuki, Podlaskie Voivodeship (north-east Poland)
