= Franklin, Łódź Voivodeship =

Franklin
- Village
- Location within Poland
- Coordinates: 51°49′18″N 20°31′35″E
- Country: Poland
- Voivodeship: Łódź
- County: Rawa
- Gmina: Biała Rawska

Franklin [ˈfraŋklʲin] is a village in the administrative district of Gmina Biała Rawska, within Rawa County, Łódź Voivodeship, in central Poland.
