= Dańków, Łódź Voivodeship =

Dańków
- Village
- Location within Poland
- Coordinates: 51°50′2″N 20°31′37″E
- Country: Poland
- Voivodeship: Łódź
- County: Rawa
- Gmina: Biała Rawska

Dańków [ˈdaɲkuf] is a village in the administrative district of Gmina Biała Rawska, within Rawa County, Łódź Voivodeship, in central Poland.
