= Grzymkowice =

- Village
- Location within Poland
- Coordinates: 51°51′31″N 20°31′37″E
- Country: Poland
- Voivodeship: Łódź
- County: Rawa
- Gmina: Biała Rawska
- Elevation: 180 m (590 ft)
- Population (approx.): 200

Grzymkowice [ɡʐɨmkɔˈvʲit͡sɛ] is a village in the administrative district of Gmina Biała Rawska, within Rawa County, Łódź Voivodeship, in central Poland.

The village has an approximate population of 200.
