= Sławków, Łódź Voivodeship =

Sławków
- Village
- Location within Poland
- Coordinates: 51°44′57″N 20°26′46″E
- Country: Poland
- Voivodeship: Łódź
- County: Rawa
- Gmina: Regnów

Sławków [ˈswafkuf] is a village in the administrative district of Gmina Regnów, within Rawa County, Łódź Voivodeship, in central Poland.
