= Żurawka =

- Village
- Location within Poland
- Coordinates: 51°49′N 20°27′E
- Country: Poland
- Voivodeship: Łódź
- County: Rawa
- Gmina: Biała Rawska

Żurawka [ʐuˈrafka] is a village in the administrative district of Gmina Biała Rawska, within Rawa County, Łódź Voivodeship, in central Poland.
