= Gortatowice =

Village in Łódź Voivodeship, Poland

- Village
- Location within Poland
- Coordinates: 51°39′52″N 20°20′54″E
- Country: Poland
- Voivodeship: Łódź
- County: Rawa
- Gmina: Cielądz

Gortatowice [ɡɔrtatɔˈvit͡sɛ] is a village in the administrative district of Gmina Cielądz, within Rawa County, Łódź Voivodeship, in central Poland. According to the 2021 census, the village had a population of 95.

== History ==
The settlement is recorded as Gotharthowycze in 1449 and as Gortharthowycze in 1456. he nineteenth-century Geographical Dictionary of the Kingdom of Poland also recorded the variant Gotartowice and associated the place-name with the personal names Gotart or Godart. The village had 10 houses and 89 inhabitants in 1827. By 1881, it had 19 houses and 110 inhabitants and contained the communal administrative office.

During the interwar period, the village and a colony of the same name formed part of the rural Gmina Gortatowice in Rawa County, which then belonged to Warsaw Voivodeship. Rawa County was transferred to Łódź Voivodeship on 1 April 1939.

Under the administrative reform of 1954, a gromada with its council seated in Gortatowice was established from fourteen localities formerly belonging to Gmina Gortatowice. The gromada system was abolished at the end of 1972, when gminas were restored throughout Poland with effect from 1 January 1973.

Two archaeological sites in Gortatowice, designated AZP 68-60/4 and AZP 68-60/5, are included in the municipal heritage register.
