= Byki, Łódź Voivodeship =

Byki
- Village
- Location within Poland
- Coordinates: 51°50′N 20°34′E
- Country: Poland
- Voivodeship: Łódź
- County: Rawa
- Gmina: Biała Rawska
- Time zone: UTC+1 (CET)
  - Summer (DST): UTC+2 (CEST)
- ISO 3166 code: POL

Byki [ˈbɨkʲi] is a village in the administrative district of Gmina Biała Rawska, within Rawa County, Łódź Voivodeship, in central Poland.
