= Ossowice =

- Village
- Location within Poland
- Coordinates: 51°43′N 20°18′E
- Country: Poland
- Voivodeship: Łódź
- County: Rawa
- Gmina: Cielądz

Ossowice [ɔssɔˈvit͡sɛ] is a village in the administrative district of Gmina Cielądz, within Rawa County, Łódź Voivodeship, in central Poland.
