= Teresin, Rawa County =

Teresin
- Village
- Location within Poland
- Coordinates: 51°49′21″N 20°32′51″E
- Country: Poland
- Voivodeship: Łódź
- County: Rawa
- Gmina: Biała Rawska

Teresin (Polish pronunciation: [tɛˈrɛɕin]) is a village in the administrative district of Gmina Biała Rawska, within Rawa County, Łódź Voivodeship, in central Poland.
