= Teodozjów, Rawa County =

Teodozjów
- Village
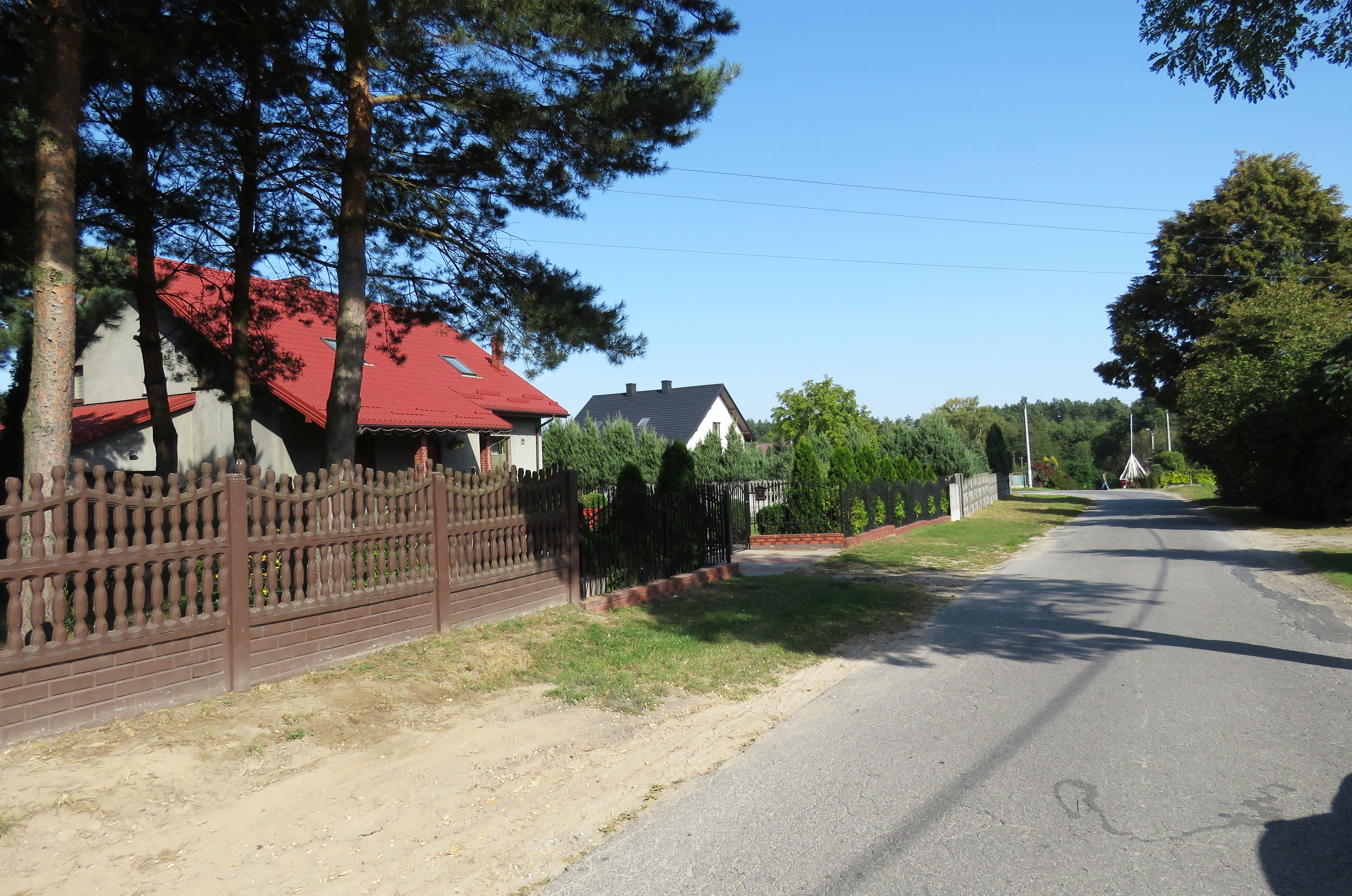
- The village in 2020

- Location within Poland
- Coordinates: 51°48′17″N 20°21′55″E
- Country: Poland
- Voivodeship: Łódź
- County: Rawa
- Gmina: Biała Rawska
- Population (approx.): 180

Teodozjów [tɛɔˈdɔzjuf] is a village in the administrative district of Gmina Biała Rawska, within Rawa County, Łódź Voivodeship, in central Poland.

The village has an approximate population of 180.
