= Marianów, Rawa County =

Marianów
- Village
- Location within Poland
- Coordinates: 51°49′6″N 20°25′17″E
- Country: Poland
- Voivodeship: Łódź
- County: Rawa
- Gmina: Biała Rawska

Marianów [maˈrjanuf] is a village in the administrative district of Gmina Biała Rawska, within Rawa County, Łódź Voivodeship, in central Poland.
