= Krukówka =

Krukówka may refer to the following places:

- Krukówka, Łódź Voivodeship (central Poland)
- Krukówka, Lublin Voivodeship (east Poland)
- Krukówka, Podlaskie Voivodeship (north-east Poland)
