= Stara Wieś, Rawa County =

Stara Wieś
- Village
- Location within Poland
- Coordinates: 51°46′53″N 20°30′42″E
- Country: Poland
- Voivodeship: Łódź
- County: Rawa
- Gmina: Biała Rawska

Stara Wieś [ˈstara ˈvʲɛɕ] is a village in the administrative district of Gmina Biała Rawska, in Rawa County, Łódź Voivodeship, in central Poland.
