= Parolice =

- Village
- Location within Poland
- Coordinates: 51°41′16″N 20°19′33″E
- Country: Poland
- Voivodeship: Łódź
- County: Rawa
- Gmina: Cielądz

Parolice [parɔˈlit͡sɛ] is a village in the administrative district of Gmina Cielądz, within Rawa County, Łódź Voivodeship, in central Poland.
