= Ossa, Rawa County =

Ossa
- Village
- Location within Poland
- Coordinates: 51°48′50″N 20°23′9″E
- Country: Poland
- Voivodeship: Łódź
- County: Rawa
- Gmina: Biała Rawska

Ossa [ˈɔsːa] is a village in the administrative district of Gmina Biała Rawska, within Rawa County, Łódź Voivodeship, in central Poland.

== See also ==
- Ossa, Opoczno County
