= Mroczkowice =

Mroczkowice may refer to the following places in Poland:

- Mroczkowice, Lower Silesian Voivodeship (south-west Poland)
- Mroczkowice, Łódź Voivodeship (central Poland)
