= Stolniki =

- Village
- Location within Poland
- Coordinates: 51°40′N 20°23′E
- Country: Poland
- Voivodeship: Łódź
- County: Rawa
- Gmina: Cielądz

Stolniki [stɔlˈniki] is a village in the administrative district of Gmina Cielądz, within Rawa County, Łódź Voivodeship, in central Poland.
