= Franopol =

Franopol may refer to:

- Franopol, Łódź Voivodeship
- Franopol, Masovian Voivodeship
