= Zofiów =

- Village
- Location within Poland
- Coordinates: 51°46′13″N 20°27′40″E
- Country: Poland
- Voivodeship: Łódź
- County: Rawa
- Gmina: Biała Rawska

Zofiów [ˈzɔfjuf] is a village in the administrative district of Gmina Biała Rawska, within Rawa County, Łódź Voivodeship, in central Poland.
