= Szczuki, Łódź Voivodeship =

Szczuki
- Village
- Location within Poland
- Coordinates: 51°45′N 20°34′E
- Country: Poland
- Voivodeship: Łódź
- County: Rawa
- Gmina: Biała Rawska
- Population (approx.): 210

Szczuki [ˈʂt͡ʂukʲi] is a village in the administrative district of Gmina Biała Rawska, within Rawa County, Łódź Voivodeship, in central Poland.

The village has an approximate population of 210.
