= Łaszczyn, Łódź Voivodeship =

Łaszczyn
- Village
- Location within Poland
- Coordinates: 51°43′8″N 20°22′35″E
- Country: Poland
- Voivodeship: Łódź
- County: Rawa
- Gmina: Cielądz

Łaszczyn [ˈwaʂt͡ʂɨn] is a village in the administrative district of Gmina Cielądz, within Rawa County, Łódź Voivodeship, in central Poland.
