= Narty, Łódź Voivodeship =

Narty
- Village
- Location within Poland
- Coordinates: 51°50′46″N 20°27′29″E
- Country: Poland
- Voivodeship: Łódź
- County: Rawa
- Gmina: Biała Rawska

Narty [ˈnartɨ] is a village in the administrative district of Gmina Biała Rawska, within Rawa County, Łódź Voivodeship, in central Poland.
