= Gmina Cielądz =

Gmina Cielądz Cielądz Commune
- Gmina
- Interactive map of Gmina Cielądz
- Coordinates (Cielądz): 51°43′N 20°21′E
- Country: Poland
- Voivodeship: Łódź
- County: Rawa
- Seat: Cielądz

Area
  - Total: 93.88 km^{2} (36.25 sq mi)

Population (2006)
  - Total: 4,100
  - Density: 44/km^{2} (110/sq mi)
- Time zone: UTC+1 (CET)
  - Summer (DST): UTC+2 (CEST)
- Website: www.cieladz.bip.tc.pl

Gmina Cielądz is a rural gmina (administrative district) in Rawa County, Łódź Voivodeship, in central Poland. Its seat is the village of Cielądz, which lies approximately 9 kilometres (6 mi) south-east of Rawa Mazowiecka and 62 km (39 mi) east of the regional capital Łódź.

The gmina covers an area of 93.88 square kilometres (36.2 sq mi), and as of 2006 its total population is 4,100.

== Villages ==
Gmina Cielądz contains the villages and settlements of:

- Brzozówka
- Cielądz
- Gortatowice
- Grabice
- Gułki
- Komorów
- Kuczyzna
- Łaszczyn
- Mała Wieś
- Mroczkowice
- Niemgłowy
- Ossowice
- Parolice
- Sanogoszcz
- Sierzchowy
- Stolniki
- Wisówka
- Wylezinek
- Zuski

== Neighbouring gminas ==
Gmina Cielądz is bordered by the gminas of Czerniewice, Nowe Miasto nad Pilicą, Rawa Mazowiecka, Regnów, Rzeczyca and Sadkowice.
