= Galiny, Łódź Voivodeship =

Galiny
- Village
- Location within Poland
- Coordinates: 51°50′24″N 20°35′34″E
- Country: Poland
- Voivodeship: Łódź
- County: Rawa
- Gmina: Biała Rawska

Galiny (Polish pronunciation: [ɡaˈlinɨ]) is a village in the administrative district of Gmina Biała Rawska, within Rawa County, Łódź Voivodeship, in central Poland.
