= Franopol, Łódź Voivodeship =

Franopol
- Village
- Location within Poland
- Coordinates: 51°49′43″N 20°23′28″E
- Country: Poland
- Voivodeship: Łódź
- County: Rawa
- Gmina: Biała Rawska
- Population (approx.): 180

Franopol [fraˈnɔpɔl] is a village in the administrative district of Gmina Biała Rawska, within Rawa County, Łódź Voivodeship, in central Poland.

The village has an approximate population of 180.
