= Cielądz =

- Village
- Location within Poland
- Coordinates: 51°43′N 20°21′E
- Country: Poland
- Voivodeship: Łódź
- County: Rawa
- Gmina: Cielądz
- Population: 640

Cielądz [ˈt͡ɕɛlɔnt͡s] is a village in Rawa County, Łódź Voivodeship, in central Poland. It is the seat of the gmina (administrative district) called Gmina Cielądz.
