= Biała Rawska =

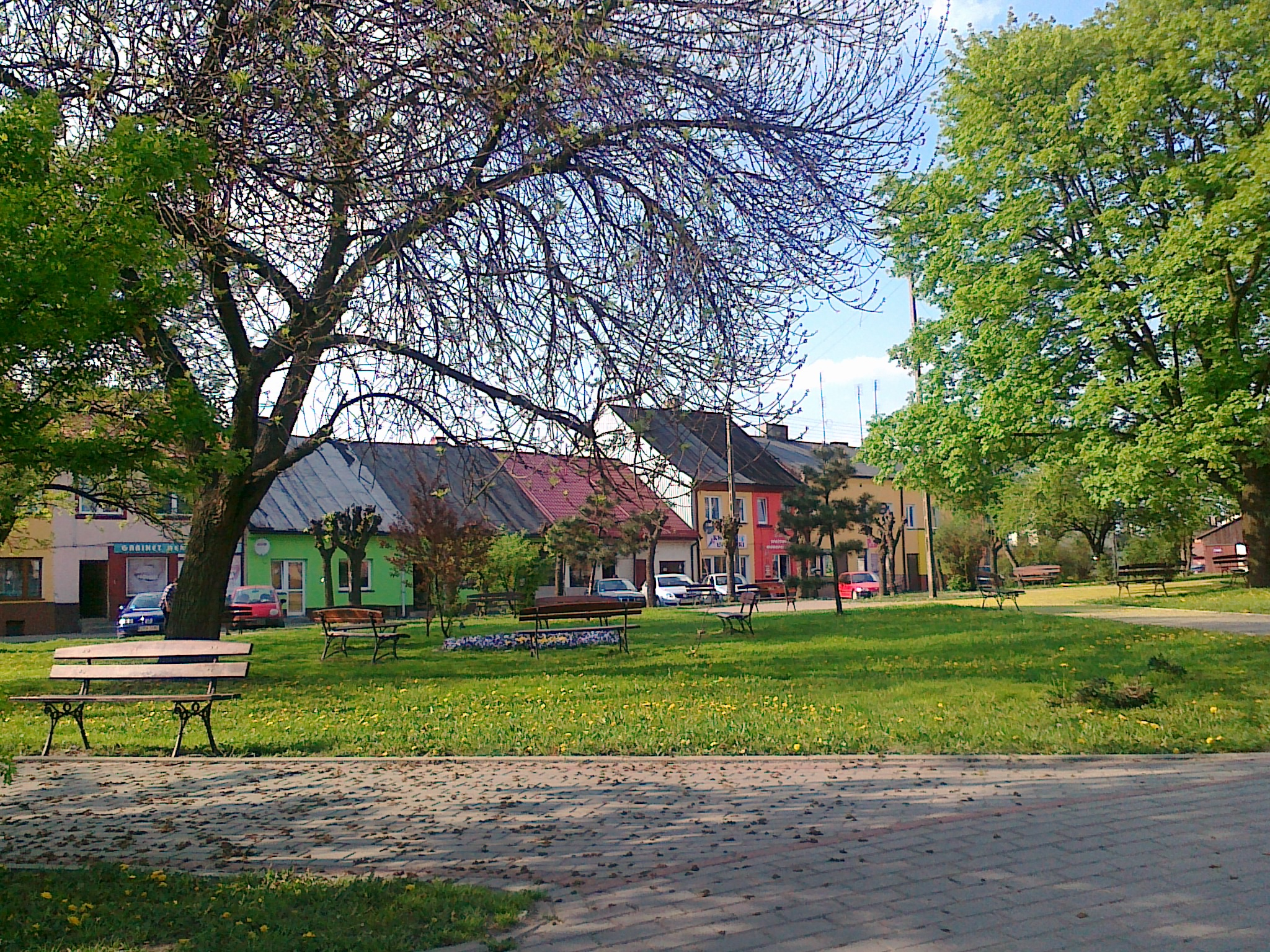
- Town center

- Coat of arms

- Location within Poland
- Coordinates: 51°48′N 20°29′E
- Country: Poland
- Voivodeship: Łódź
- County: Rawa
- Gmina: Biała Rawska

Government
  - Mayor: Wacław Adamczyk

Area
  - Total: 9.53 km^{2} (3.68 sq mi)

Population (31 December 2021)
  - Total: 3,081
  - Density: 323/km^{2} (840/sq mi)
- Time zone: UTC+1 (CET)
  - Summer (DST): UTC+2 (CEST)
- Postal code: 96-230
- Area code: +48 46
- Car plates: ERW
- Website: http://www.bialarawska.pl/

Biała Rawska [ˈbʲawa ˈrafska] is a town in Rawa County, Łódź Voivodeship, in central Poland, with 3,081 inhabitants as of December 2021.

== History ==
Biała Rawska is one of the oldest settlements of historic Mazovia. In the 12th century, it probably was an administrative center and the seat of a castellan, but first written document which confirms the existence of Bela, as it was called, comes from 1246. The gord of Bela was protected by a wooden rampart, as it did not have a defensive wall. The castellany of Bela was in the 14th century transferred to Rawa Mazowiecka.

It is not known when Biała Rawska received town charter, but it happened before 1498. At that time, the town was property of Bishops of Chełm, and was an important administrative center, seat of Biała County of Rawa Voivodeship. Located along busy merchant trails to Czersk, Łęczyca and Sandomierz, Biała prospered. Good times ended in the 1650s, during the disastrous Swedish invasion of Poland, after which the population of Biała was reduced to only 100 people. The town never recovered from Swedish destruction: in 1777, its population was only 186.

In 1870, following January Uprising, Biała lost its town charter, recovering it in 1925. In 1900, the population was over 2,000, with a significant Jewish element. In 1921, Biała's population was 2328, with 38% Poles and 61% Jews.

During World War II, Biała lost 1,800 people. That includes almost all of the approximately 1200 Jews who lived there in 1939. During the war, the Jews were persecuted and robbed; in 1941 the Jewish populace was forced to live in a ghetto. Six or seven families shared each room and as a consequence there were epidemics of typhus and other diseases. Around ten people a day died in the ghetto. In August 1942, German and Polish police surrounded the ghetto and forced Jews into trains destined for Treblinka. At Treblinka, all were murdered immediately by gassing. Only a handful of Biała Rawska's Jews survived the Holocaust.

== Notable residents ==
- Mariusz Pudzianowski (born 1977), strongman and mixed martial artist, 5-time winner of World's Strongest Man title

== Gallery ==
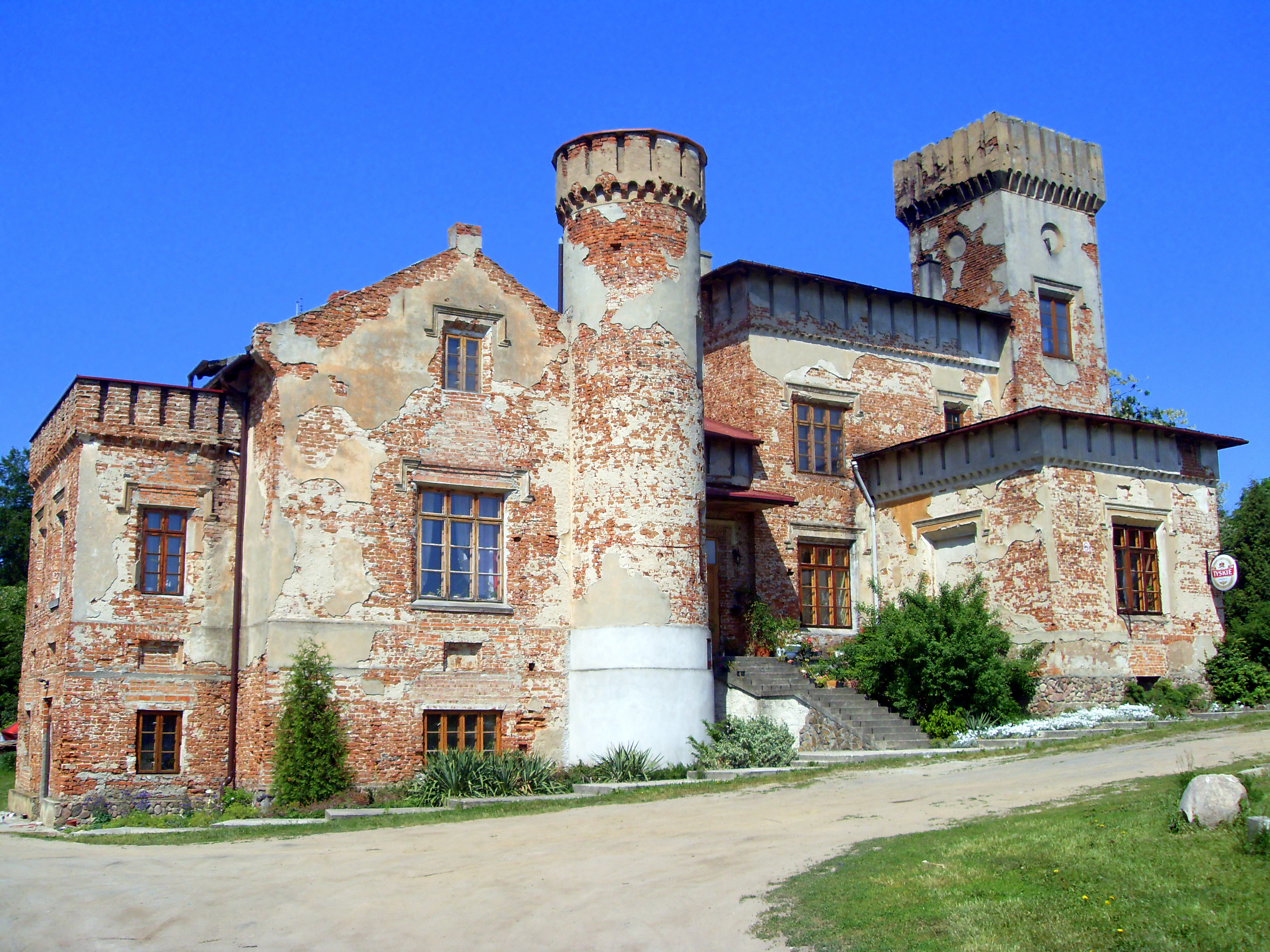
Leszczyński Palace

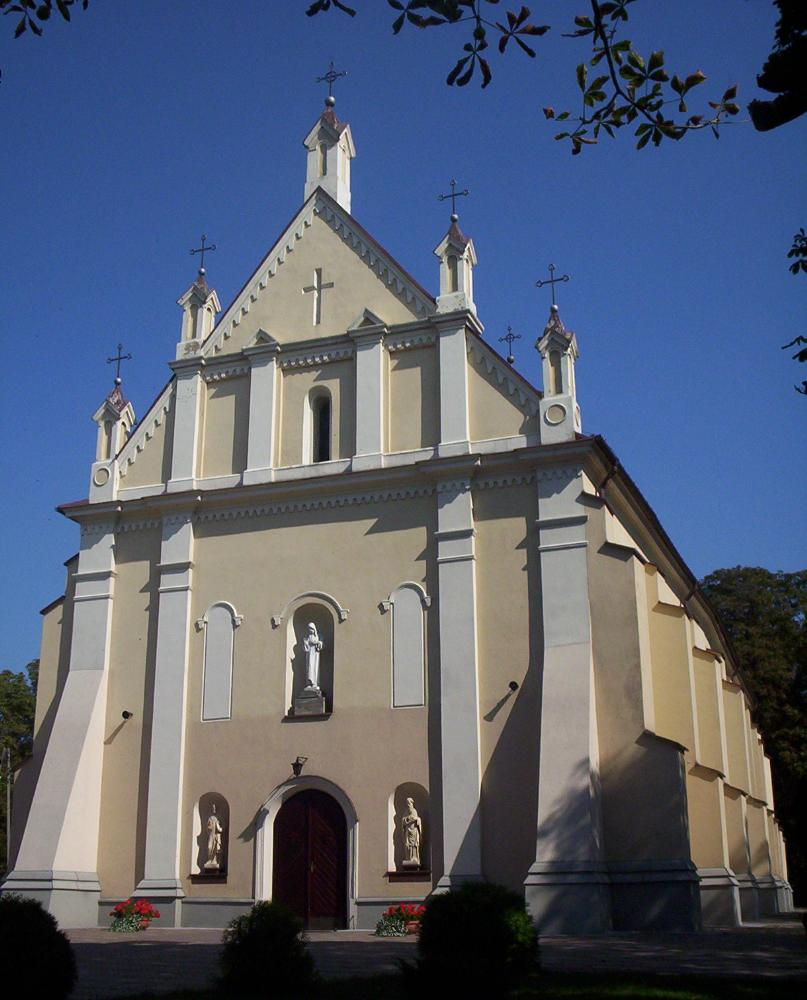
Church of Saint Adalbert

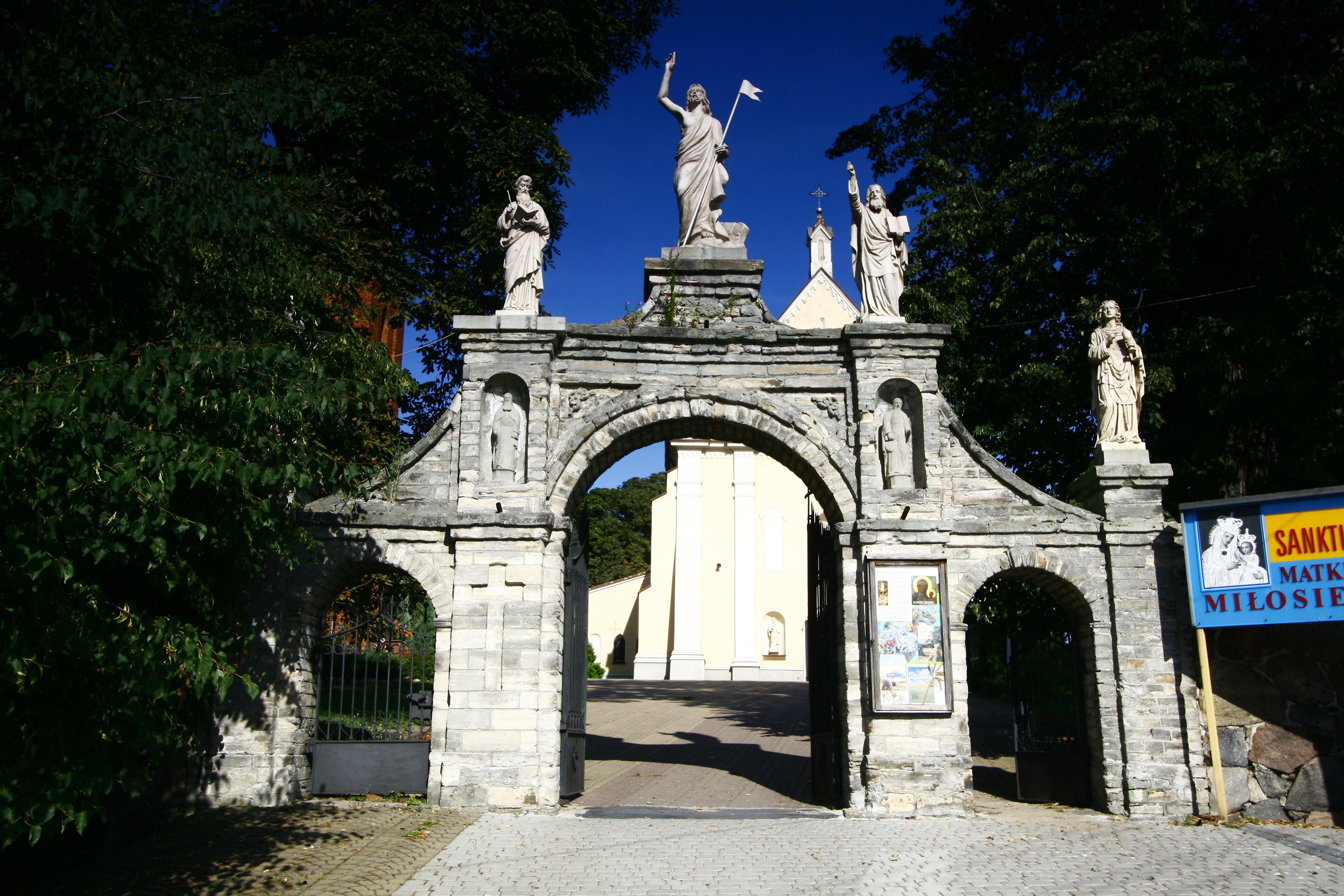
Church gate

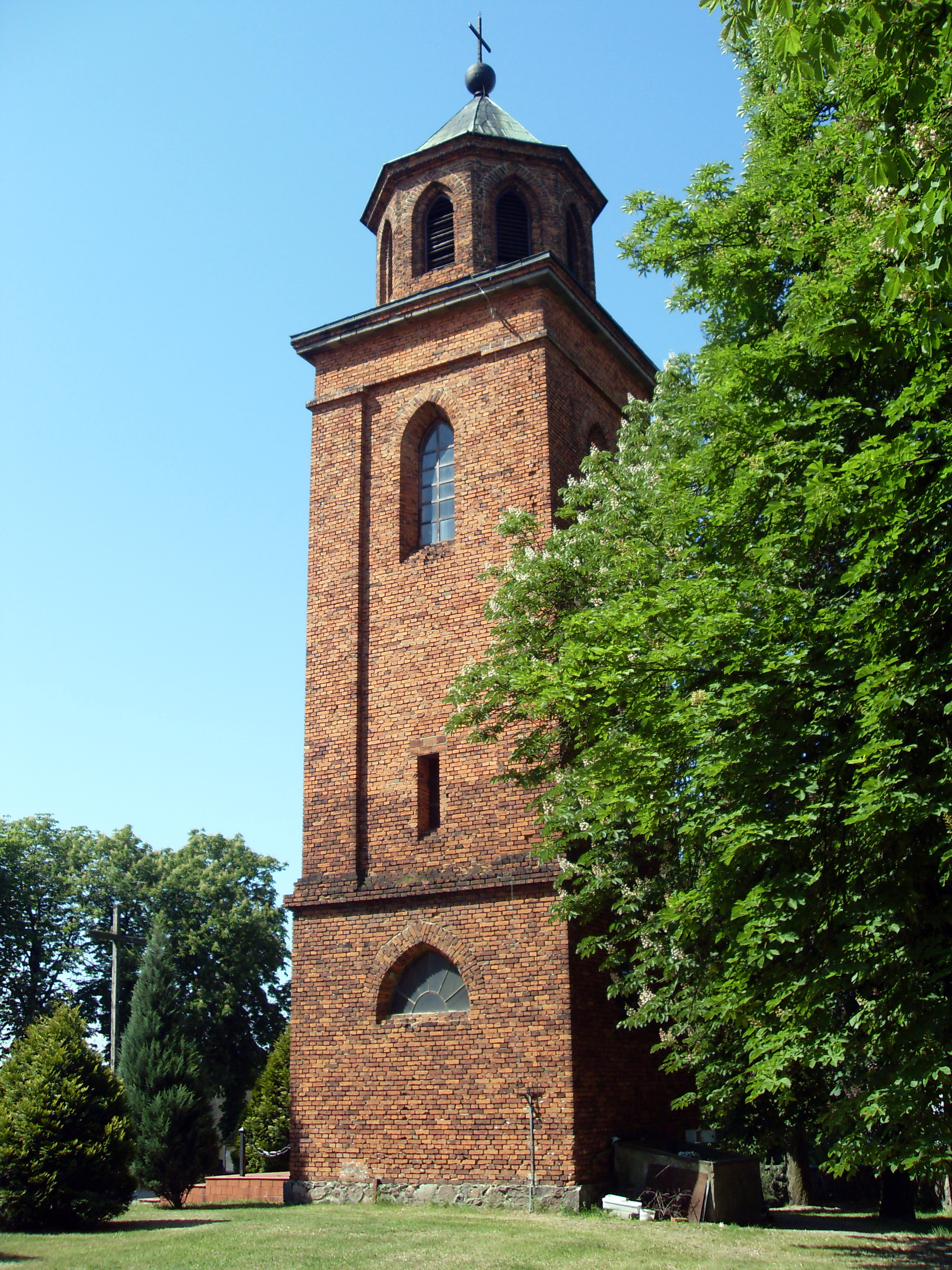
Belfry

== Transport ==
Biała Rawska lies along voivodeship road 725 which connects it to Rawa Mazowiecka (for the S8 expressway) to the west and to Grójec (for the S7 expressway) to the east.

The nearest railway station is in Skierniewice.
