= Galiny Palace =

Coordinates: 54.1628°N 20.8218°E

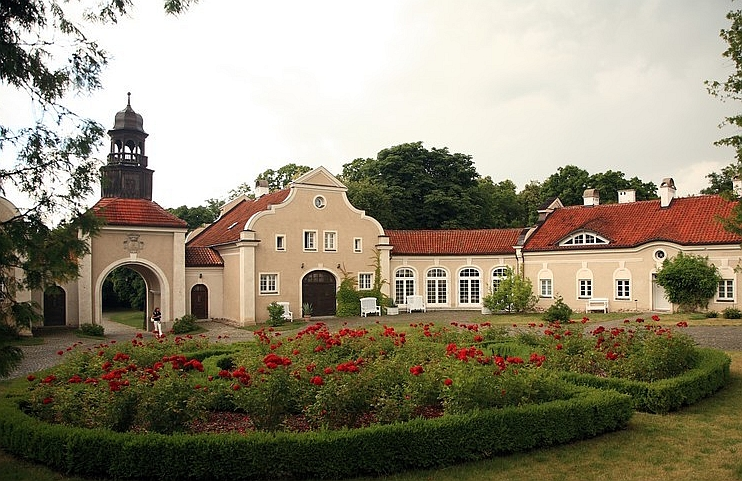
- Interactive map of the Galiny Palace area

General information
- Type: Palace
- Architectural style: Renaissance
- Location: Galiny, Gmina Bartoszyce, Poland
- Completed: 1589

Galiny Palace (Palace of the von Eulenburg family) (Polish: Pałac w Galinach, German: Schloss Gallingen) is a palace complex with a park complex and numerous farm buildings located in the village of Galiny in the Bartoszyce commune in the Warmian-Masurian Voivodeship. The palace was built in 1589 in the Renaissance style for Baron Botho zu Eulenburg, as the seat of the Prussian noble family von Eulenburg.

== Location ==
The palace is located in the village of Galiny, approximately 10 km south of Bartoszyce, near national road No. 57 on the Bartoszyce (Plęsy)-Biskupiec section. The palace complex is located on the outskirts of the village, by a local road.

== History ==
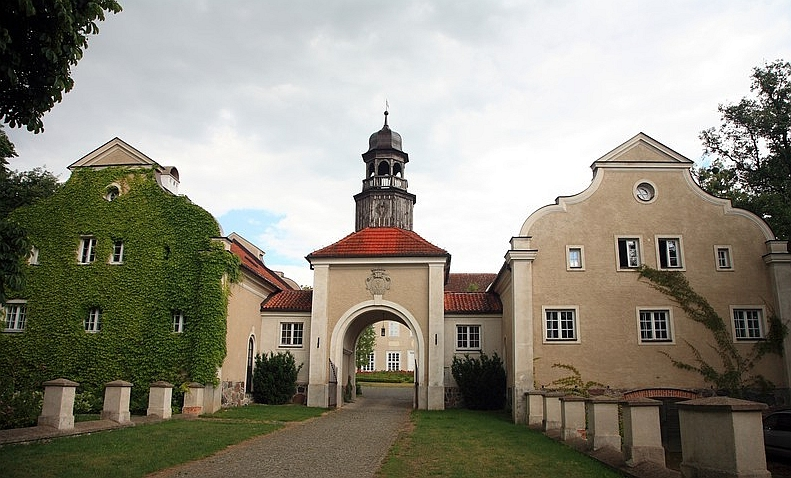
The main complex of palace buildings

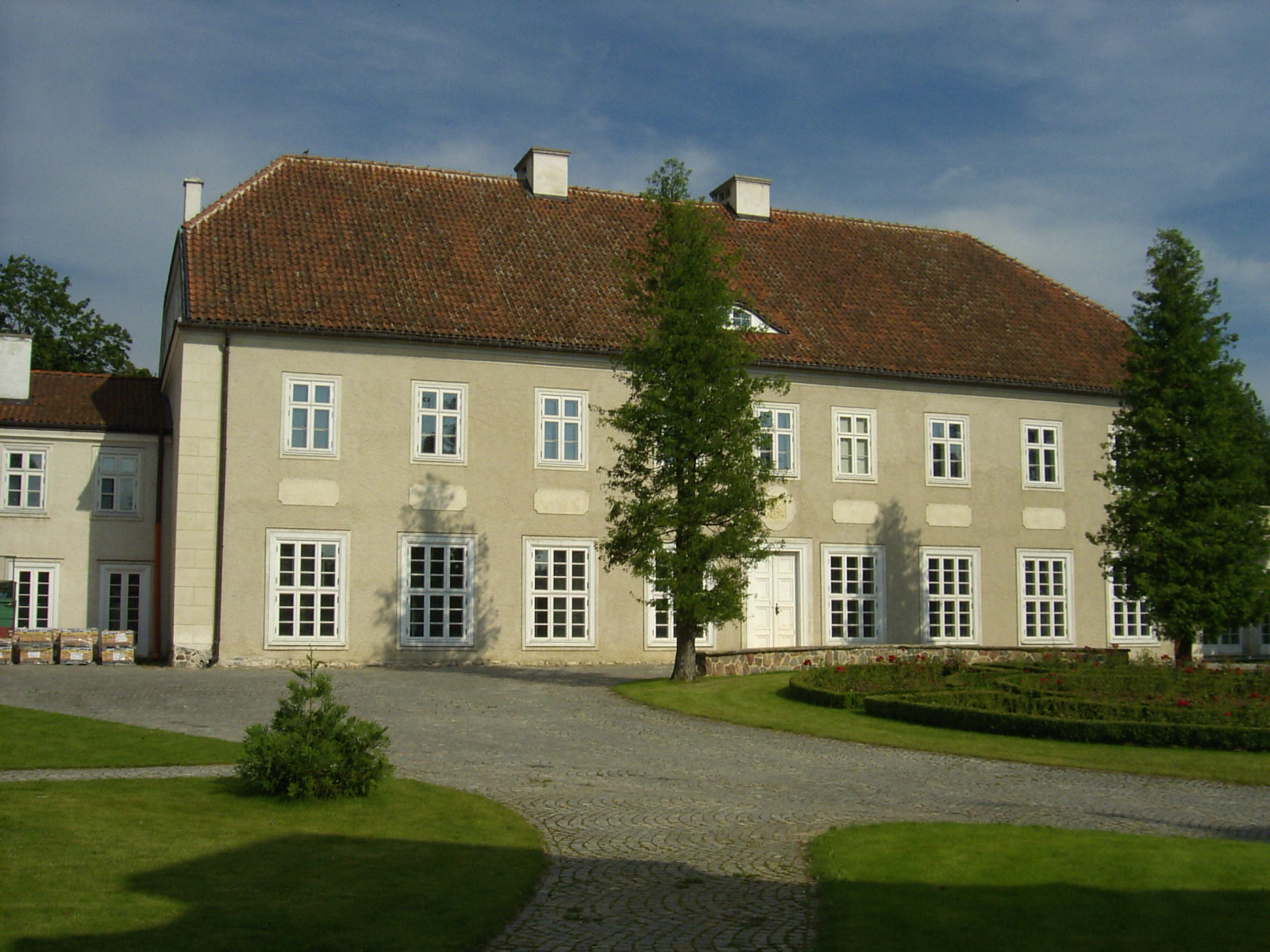
Main palace and courtyard

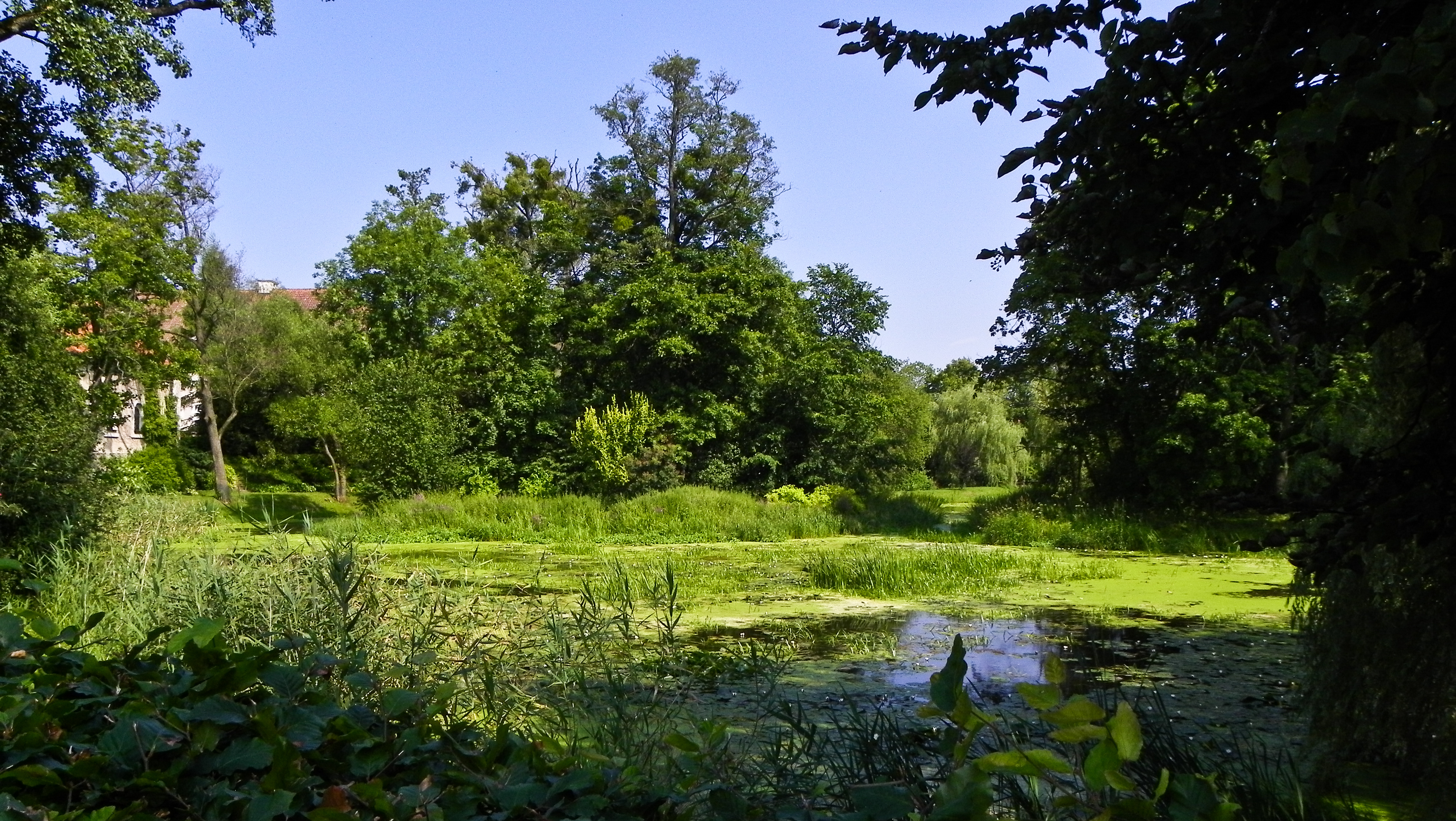
Historic park

The history of the village dates back to the Middle Ages, when the first mention of Galiny appears in 1336. Then, sources say that in 1486, the Grand Master of the Teutonic Order, Heinrich Reuss von Plauen, granted the territories of Galindia to the Saxony-born knight Wend Illeburg for his military merits.

This marked the beginning of the settlement of one of the largest and most powerful noble families in these territories – von Eulenburg, which built its first residence in the mayorate in Galiny in the second half of the 15th century. It was a wooden stronghold, standing on a stone and brick foundation, which, together with the courtyard, was also surrounded by wooden buildings. Its few fragments are visible in the corner of the palace complex, which was built in 1589 for a representative of the Botho zu Eulenburg family (1549–1629). Situated on a small hill, the palace had a defensive character and was additionally surrounded by a moat, to which water was supplied from the nearby Pisa River and the only access to which was through a drawbridge. It is also known that in the past, under the riverbed, to the nearby church, there was an escape tunnel, the exit from which was under the altar.

In 1745, a half-timbered granary was added to the estate, right in front of the entrance gate to the palace. A little later, in the mid-18th century, buildings for economic purposes were added: a stable, a coach house and an entrance gate. A century later, all these buildings, along with the two towers on the north side of the palace, were rebuilt in the neo-Gothic style. At the same time, the moat surrounding the complex was closed and the river level was lowered.

In 1709, the noble family von Eulenburg, in recognition of their achievements, was honored with the title of baron, and in 1786 with the title of count. One of the most famous representatives of the family was Gottfried Heinrich zu Eulenburg, who came from Galin, and after a personal tragedy (the death of his wife and child), he converted to Catholicism, became a canon of Warmia and founded chapels in Frombork and Wozławki. In Galiny itself, in the medieval church which was under the patronage of the Eulenburgs and where the tombstones of the family members are located, he founded a library.

In the 19th century, a park was established on the estate. This was initiated by Malwina Hermina Ewelina Fryderyk zu Dohn z Gładysz, who was the wife of the then-owner of the facility, Botho Ernst zu Eulenburg. It was an English-style landscape park with an area of 4 hectares. It took advantage of the terrain and the rising water on the river flowing through the estate. There was a winding path through the park, from the north gate. There was also a gardener's house there. After 1945, the park remained neglected and lost its value. Currently, it is partially reconstructed with the help of landscape architects.

In the same century, farm buildings were built for the needs of the farm run by the Eulenburg family. They were located on the southwestern side of the main palace complexes. Among other buildings, a forge was built at that time, and in 1899, a building with a tower and a clock was constructed.

At the turn of the 19th and 20th centuries, the Eulenburg estate covered an area of 1,260 hectares and was one of the largest estates in East Prussia. In 1921, by order of the representative of the Botho-Wend zu Eulenburg family, the palace underwent a thorough reconstruction. He hired an architect, the Silesian Count Hochberg, who, by removing the neo-Gothic decorations of the gate, coach house, stables and towers, rebuilt the palace according to the original pattern and gave the palace its current appearance.

In early 1945, during the offensive, the palace was occupied by the Soviet Army. The property and interior were plundered, many works of art and parts of the furnishings were thrown in front of the palace and later burned. His nephew Udo Graf zu Eulenburg became the owner of the palace, but after a week the building was taken over by the Polish authorities. However, the main palace structures were not destroyed. Count Botho Wend zu Eulenburg was arrested and died during deportation to Siberia.

After the war, the palace complex was used as a summer camp. Then the property was taken over by the State Treasury and the palace and the entire complex, unused and unrenovated, fell into ruin. The completely devastated palace complex was bought by private owners in 1995. For several years, they carried out thorough renovation and conservation works throughout the entire facility. Almost every element of the property was renovated, such as foundations, roofs, ceilings and plasters, and numerous technical installations were replaced. Conservation work is still ongoing on the renovation of the main palace building, including the adaptation of the basements.

Currently, the palace houses a hotel complex with a two-level inn and a horse stable. Conferences, training sessions, and various events are held there. The entire complex is maintained in full usability. This is evidenced by the gold medal from the Ministry of Culture and National Heritage for the best-conducted restoration in the 4th competition for the best work in the field of protection of historic garden establishments.

== Architecture ==
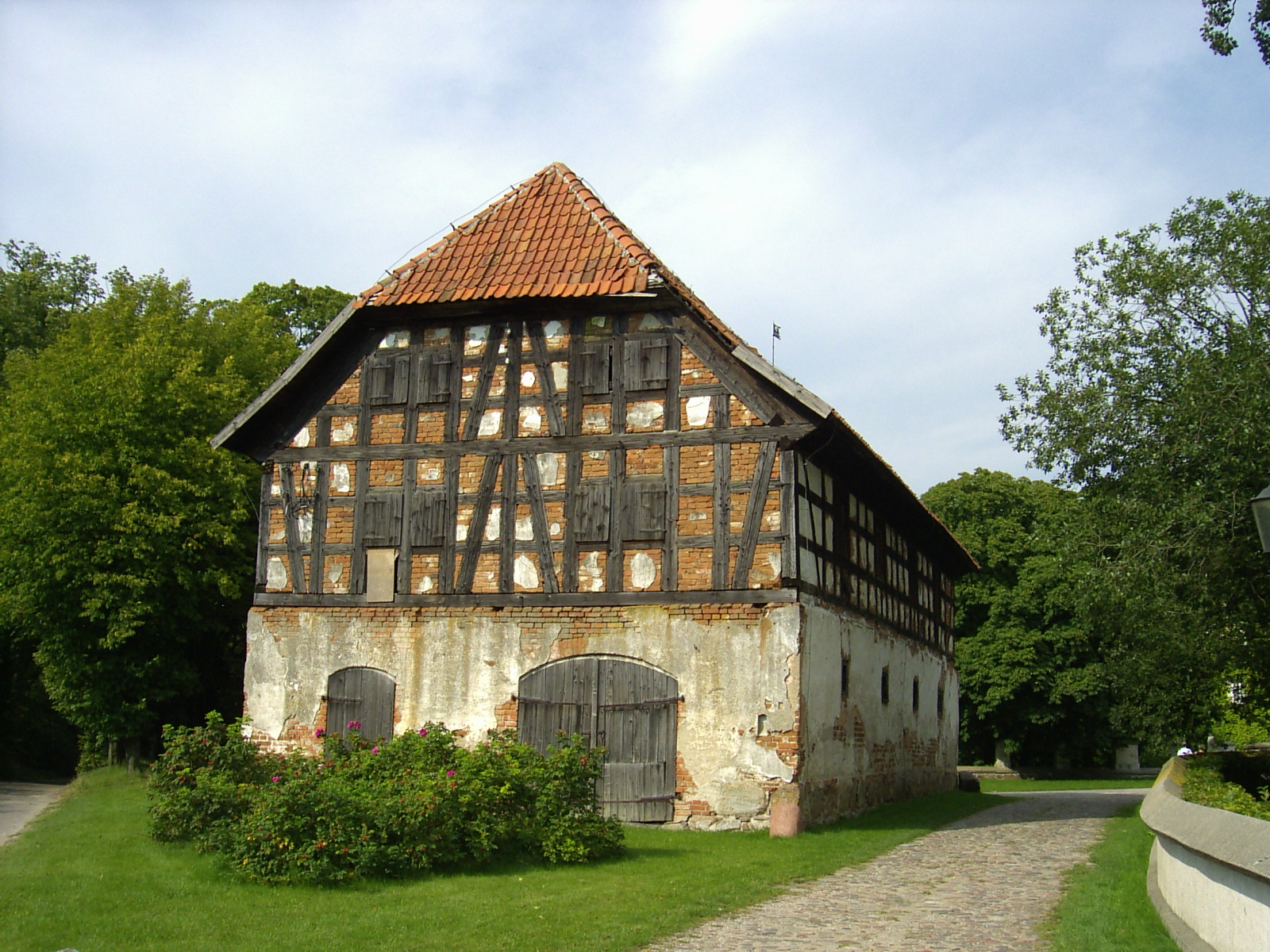
A half-timbered granary from 1745

The Galiny estate currently consists of several historic parts: a palace complex with the main palace and farm buildings, most of which today house a guesthouse and the owners' living quarters, and farm buildings with old stables, which house a stud farm and rooms for the needs of a 200-hectare farm.

The main palace itself is located in a Renaissance-style complex of seven interconnected buildings surrounding the main courtyard. Apart from the palace, it also includes an entrance gate with a clock tower, a coach house, a stable, a palace outbuilding, an orangery and a corner palace building with towers. The complex was built on a U-shaped plan, with the main palace as the base. Later, parts of the eastern wing were destroyed, which undermined the original layout. The courtyard is accessed via a paved road leading through the entrance gate with a clock, a turret and a cartouche of the Eulenburg coat of arms. The driveway in the main courtyard forms a circle and its central part is filled with roses.

The body of the main palace building, the oldest part of the estate, has a rectangular plan and consists of two floors and an attic. The palace's current appearance was given to it during reconstruction in 1921. The architect, the Silesian Count Hochberg, removed the Neo-Gothic elements added a century earlier from the palace and parts of the surrounding buildings, which restored the palace to its original (and current) Renaissance appearance and character. It is also known that in one of the rooms of the palace there is a portrait of a member of Aunt Ellie's family, which was the only one to survive from the rich pre-war collection of works of art. However, elements of the old interior furnishings have been preserved, such as a staircase, stoves and an old built-in wardrobe.

The interiors of the gate buildings – the former coach house and stables – have been fully restored, preserving the old historical and original style. Late Gothic vaults have been preserved there. The orangery located next to the coach house has its own, separate entrance to the courtyard.

There is also an old granary on the estate. It was added in 1745 right in front of the entrance gate to the main palace complex. It has a rectangular plan with a hipped roof and two floors. It was built using the half-timbered technique with very visible beams, typical of the so-called half-timbered wall.

== Library ==
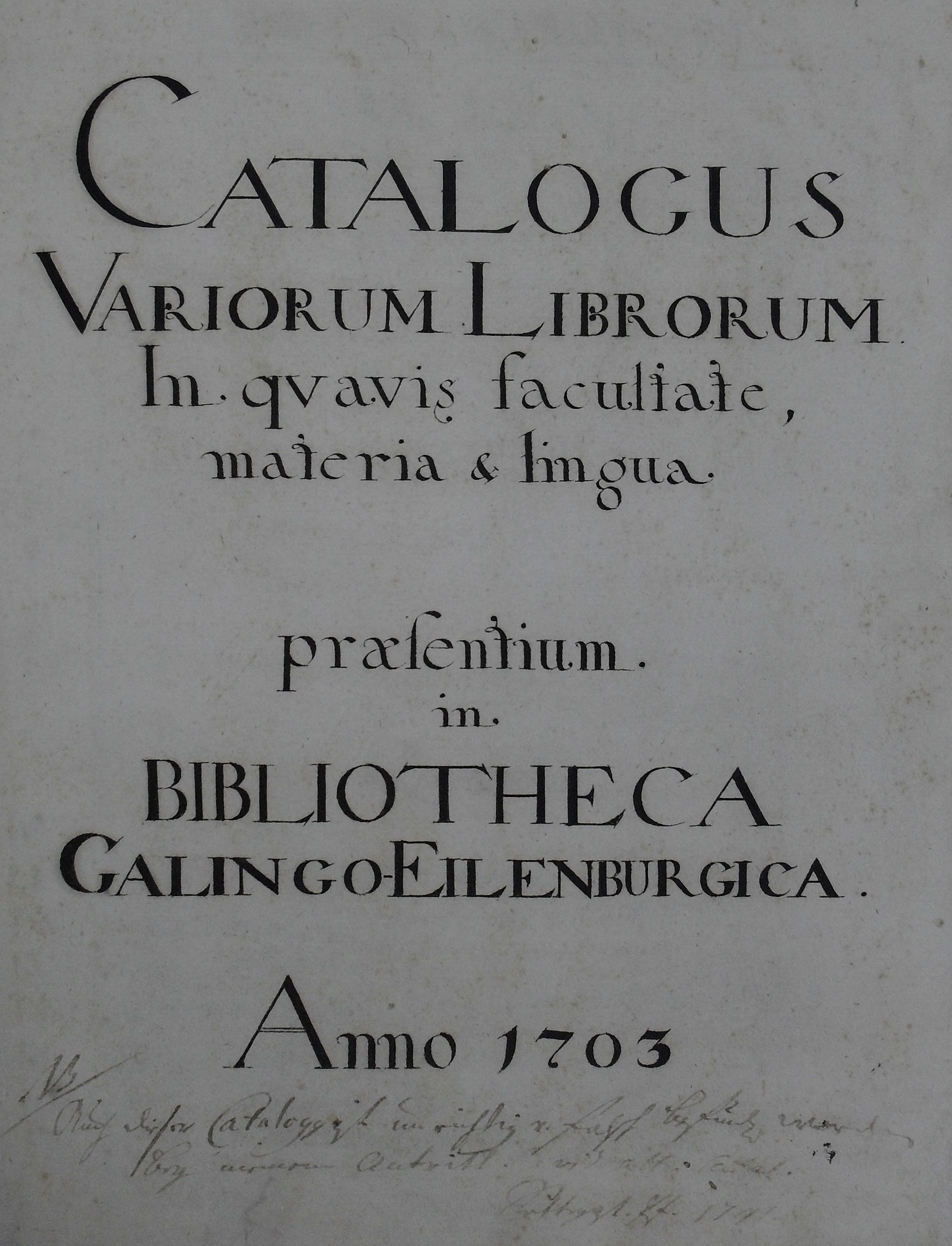
Title page of the catalog of the Eulenburg family library from 1703.

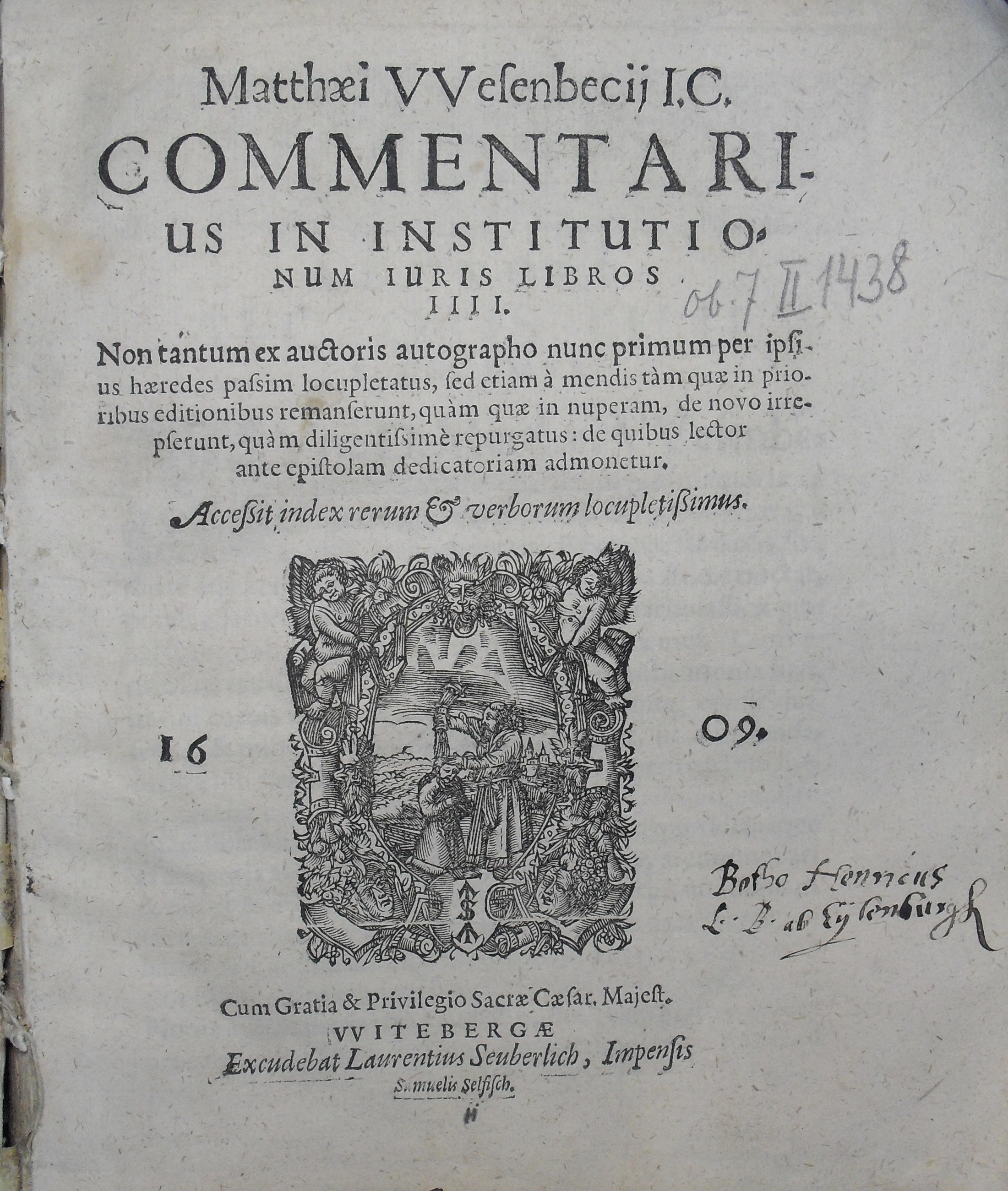
Title page of a book from the Eulenburg family library.

There was a library in the Galiny palace. In 1726, Gottfried Heinrich zu Eulenburg founded a family library for the parish church in Galiny. The library endowment was a gesture of the son's gratitude to his father, Botho Heinrich zu Eulenburg, for whom he also donated a portrait that once hung in the church in Galiny (now in the collection of the Wojciech Kętrzyński Museum in Kętrzyn). This painting included information about the depicted figure, the benefactor and the library: "Bohtto Heinrich Freyherr zu Eyllenburg, Oberster Cam[m]er Herr, Preuß-Landv. Ober-Appelations Gerichts Rath Erb-Herr auff Gallingen Tolcksdorff und Hermanhagen etc. Ein eintziger Sohn und der letzte von seinem Hause setztet dieses, nebst dieser Bibliothec seinem lieben Vatter aus kindlicher Pflicht, zu einem im[m]er [...] andencken Verfluchtt sey der so dieses andencken zerstöret 1726." In 1860, Ludwig zu Eulenburg also enlarged the church library with an unknown number of books.

After World War II, as a result of securing former German book collections, the books of the Eulenburg family and the church in Galiny were transferred to the Nicolaus Copernicus University Library in Toruń, where currently there are approximately 1,053 bibliographic items of old prints in approximately 552 volumes and 8 manuscripts. The small collection of manuscripts consists of works on various topics in German or Latin, including the handwritten library catalog of the Eulenburg family library from 1703: "Catalogus variorum librorum in quavis facultate materia et lingua praesentium in Bibliotheca Galingo-Eilenburgica Anno 1703". The catalog is divided into sections (theology, law, medicine, philosophy, varia), and the books within the sections are arranged according to format. Descriptions are short and consist of a fragment of the title and the author. The catalog, which has 21 pages, has separate Arabic numbering for each section. The layout of the catalog indicates that after the collections were transferred to the church, a completely different classification was created to organize the collections, using the abbreviations Tit., Roman and Arabic numerals.

Chronologically, the printed collection opens with 4 bibliographic items in 3 volumes of incunabula, representing editions of works in the field of canon law. These include the decretals of Pope Boniface VIII issued in 1486 and the Decretum Gratiani printed in 1493. The content of the resource of old prints from the 16th to 18th centuries covers most areas of knowledge. There are no prints in Polish among them, but there are prints strictly related to the history of the Polish state. The 16th-century works include a collection of legal norms concerning the entire territory of the Kingdom of Poland, prepared by Jan Herburt and published in Krakow in 1567, entitled "Statuta Regni Poloniae in ordinem alphabeti digesta". Some of the prints collected in the library also concern the history and legislation of Ducal Prussia, including a historical work by Christoph Hartknoch, a professor of the Toruń high school, "Alt und Neues Preussen" (Królewiec 1684) and a source for the history of provincial law, "Ius terrestrae nobilitatis Prussiae correctum", published in 1599 in Toruń by Andreas Cotenius. The Eulenburg family collection also includes 17th-century commemorative prints, containing short speeches and mourning poems dedicated to deceased members of the Eulenburg family or family members to whom they were related, as well as congratulatory speeches and poetic works written on the occasion of marriages. The books contain handwritten entries by representatives of such Prussian families as von Wallenrod, von Gröben, von Nostitz and von Kanitz.

== Landscaped park ==
The landscaped park on the estate covers an area of 4 hectares, similar to the one it occupied when it was founded in the 19th century. Originally it was the so-called English garden, but in the post-war period it lost most of the trees from its original design. The current owners, with the help of landscape architects, recreated its 19th-century layout. The park surrounds the palace on all sides, in the eastern part creating ponds and islands on the dammed waters of the Pisa River flowing through the village and estate. In the western part, the park is located in the river valley. The park has specially marked paths leading through the best-kept parts of the gardens. One can also find numerous elements of the so-called small architecture such as footbridges, bridges, gazebos, wells, stone steps or an old cannon. The old-growth forest of the park currently consists of numerous lime trees, chestnut trees, oaks and hornbeams. In addition, there are also magnolias, rhododendrons, azaleas, maples, and commonly roses.

== Horse farm ==
A stud farm was established on the estate in 1998. Old stables and part of the historic farm buildings were adapted for its needs. The stud farm also has an indoor wooden riding arena and a horse carousel, as well as a full-size course adapted to organize show jumping competitions. Horse breeding is also carried out at the stud farm. Initially, the herd consisted of 12 mares, and currently its number is 95 horses of Trakehner, Holsteiner, Westphalian and Noble Half-Blood breeds. Horses are bred, both for sale and for breeding purposes. During most of the season (from March to November), the stud farm hosts numerous events, including harness competitions and the national Galiny Cup competition, which has been held continuously since 2004, during which up to 150 horses compete. There is also a local riding club there.

== Grave banner of little Eulenburg ==
In 1664, a member of the family, Botho Ernest zu Eulenburg, died at the age of only 3. For his funeral ceremony, a grave banner was made, which was one of the two known grave banners dedicated to children in Prussia at that time, and is currently the only such preserved copy. The banner is made of pieces of linen tablecloth sewn together, the frame is made of linen cloth and there is a triangular indentation in the lower part. On the obverse, in the central part, the banner depicts a kneeling child, while on the reverse there are epitaph inscriptions.

Originally, the banner was kept in the Eulenburg mother church in Galiny, but its deteriorating condition due to the low quality of workmanship and unsuccessful conservation carried out in the 19th century resulted in it being transferred to the collection of the museum in Kętrzyn in 1945. After several years of renovation of the work, carried out by Professor Bogumiła Rouba, the banner as a unique and singular work is again presented in museum collections.
