= Gmina Regnów =

Gmina Regnów Regnów Commune
- Gmina
- Interactive map of Gmina Regnów
- Coordinates (Regnów): 51°44′52″N 20°23′10″E
- Country: Poland
- Voivodeship: Łódź
- County: Rawa
- Seat: Regnów

Area
  - Total: 45.58 km^{2} (17.60 sq mi)

Population (2006)
  - Total: 1,856
  - Density: 40.72/km^{2} (105.5/sq mi)
- Website: http://www.ugregnow.pl/

Gmina Regnów is a rural gmina (administrative district) in Rawa County, Łódź Voivodeship, in central Poland. Its seat is the village of Regnów, which lies approximately 10 kilometres (6 mi) east of Rawa Mazowiecka and 64 km (40 mi) east of the regional capital Łódź.

The gmina covers an area of 45.58 square kilometres (17.6 sq mi), and as of 2006 its total population is 1,856.

== Villages ==
Gmina Regnów contains the villages and settlements of Annosław, Kazimierzów, Nowy Regnów, Podskarbice Królewskie, Podskarbice Szlacheckie, Regnów, Rylsk, Rylsk Duży, Rylsk Mały, Sławków, Sowidół and Wólka Strońska.

== Neighbouring gminas ==
Gmina Regnów is bordered by the gminas of Biała Rawska, Cielądz, Rawa Mazowiecka and Sadkowice.
