= Krukówka, Łódź Voivodeship =

Krukówka
- Village
- Location within Poland
- Coordinates: 51°48′20″N 20°33′31″E
- Country: Poland
- Voivodeship: Łódź
- County: Rawa
- Gmina: Biała Rawska

Krukówka [kruˈkufka] is a village in the administrative district of Gmina Biała Rawska, within Rawa County, Łódź Voivodeship, in central Poland.
