= Gmina Biała Rawska =

Gmina Biała Rawska Biała Rawska Commune
- Gmina
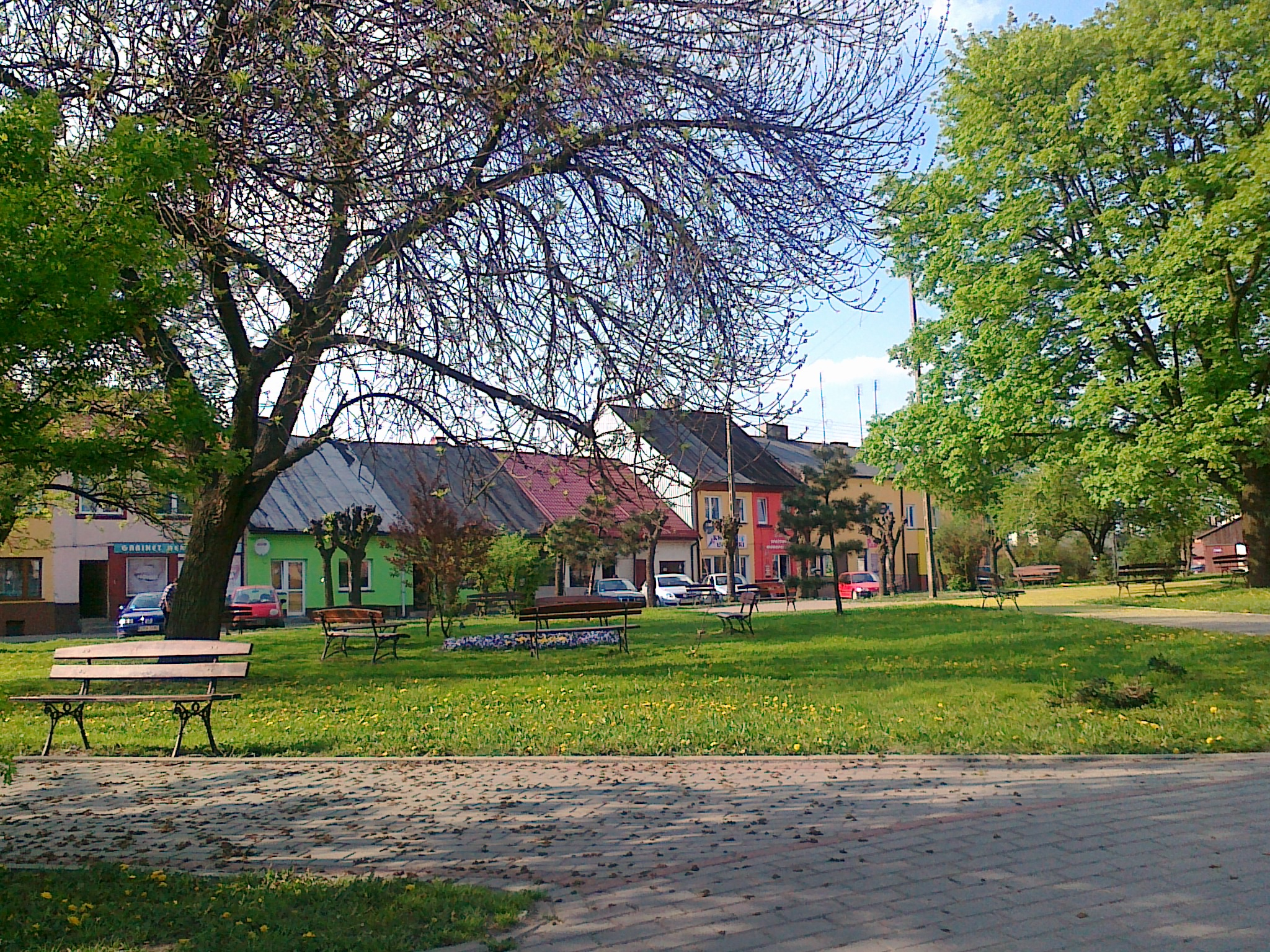

- Coat of arms
- Interactive map of Gmina Biała Rawska
- Coordinates (Biała Rawska): 51°48′N 20°29′E
- Country: Poland
- Voivodeship: Łódź
- County: Rawa
- Seat: Biała Rawska

Area
  - Total: 208.41 km^{2} (80.47 sq mi)

Population (2006)
  - Total: 11,546
  - Density: 55.400/km^{2} (143.49/sq mi)
  - Urban: 3,182
  - Rural: 8,364
- Time zone: UTC+1 (CET)
  - Summer (DST): UTC+2 (CEST)
- Website: www.bialarawska.pl

Gmina Biała Rawska is an urban-rural gmina (administrative district) in Rawa County, Łódź Voivodeship, in central Poland. Its seat is the town of Biała Rawska, which lies approximately 17 kilometres (11 mi) east of Rawa Mazowiecka and 71 km (44 mi) east of the regional capital Łódź.

The gmina covers an area of 208.41 square kilometres (80.5 sq mi). As of 2006 its total population is 11,546: 3,182 in Biała Rawska, 8,364 in rural part of the gmina.

== Villages ==
Apart from the town of Biała Rawska, Gmina Biała Rawska contains the villages and settlements of:

- Aleksandrów
- Antoninów
- Babsk
- Biała Wieś
- Białogórne
- Błażejewice
- Bronisławów
- Byki
- Chodnów
- Chrząszczew
- Chrząszczewek
- Dańków
- Franklin
- Franopol
- Galiny
- Gołyń
- Gośliny
- Grzymkowice
- Janów
- Jelitów
- Józefów
- Konstantynów
- Koprzywna
- Krukówka
- Lesiew
- Marchaty
- Marianów
- Narty
- Niemirowice
- Orla Góra
- Ossa
- Pachy
- Pągów
- Podlesie
- Podsędkowice
- Porady Górne
- Przyłuski
- Rokszyce
- Rosławowice
- Rzeczków
- Słupce
- Stanisławów
- Stara Wieś
- Studzianek
- Szczuki
- Szwejki Małe
- Teodozjów
- Teresin
- Tuniki
- Wilcze Piętki
- Wola-Chojnata
- Wólka Babska
- Wólka Lesiewska
- Zakrzew
- Zofianów
- Zofiów
- Żurawia
- Żurawka

== Neighbouring gminas ==
Gmina Biała Rawska is bordered by the town of Rawa Mazowiecka and by the gminas of Błędów Gmina Biała Rawska is bordered by the town of Rawa Mazowiecka and by the gminas of Błędów, Głuchów, Kowiesy, Mszczonów, Nowy Kawęczyn, Rawa Mazowiecka, Regnów and Sadkowice.
