= Regnów =

- Village
- Location within Poland
- Coordinates: 51°44′52″N 20°23′10″E
- Country: Poland
- Voivodeship: Łódź
- County: Rawa
- Gmina: Regnów
- Population: 340

Regnów [ˈrɛɡnuf] is a village in Rawa County, Łódź Voivodeship, in central Poland. It is the seat of the gmina (administrative district) called Gmina Regnów.
