= Biała Wieś, Łódź Voivodeship =

Biała Wieś
- Village
- Location within Poland
- Coordinates: 51°52′40″N 20°31′46″E
- Country: Poland
- Voivodeship: Łódź
- County: Rawa
- Gmina: Biała Rawska

Biała Wieś [ˈbʲawa ˈvʲɛɕ] is a village in the administrative district of Gmina Biała Rawska, within Rawa County, Łódź Voivodeship, in central Poland.
