= Mroczkowice, Łódź Voivodeship =

Mroczkowice
- Village
- Location within Poland
- Coordinates: 51°39′28″N 20°20′2″E
- Country: Poland
- Voivodeship: Łódź
- County: Rawa
- Gmina: Cielądz

Mroczkowice (Polish pronunciation: [mrɔt͡ʂkɔˈvit͡sɛ]) is a village in the administrative district of Gmina Cielądz, within Rawa County, Łódź Voivodeship, in central Poland.
