= Rilski =

Rilski may refer to:

- BC Rilski Sportist, Bulgarian basketball club
- PFC Rilski Sportist Samokov, Bulgarian football club
- Ivan Rilski (876- c. 946), Bulgarian hermit and saint
- Spiridon Rilski (1740-1824), Bulgarian monk and educator
- Neofit Rilski (1793-1881), the Neophyte of Rila, Bulgarian monk and teacher
- Rilski Manastir, also Rila Monastery, the monastery of Saint John of Rila, in Bulgaria
- St. Ivan Rilski Chapel, in the South Shetland Islands
- St. Ivan Rilski Col, geographic feature
- South-West University "Neofit Rilski", Bulgarian university

== See also ==
- Rylsky (disambiguation)
