= Galiny, Gmina Bartoszyce =

Galiny
- Village
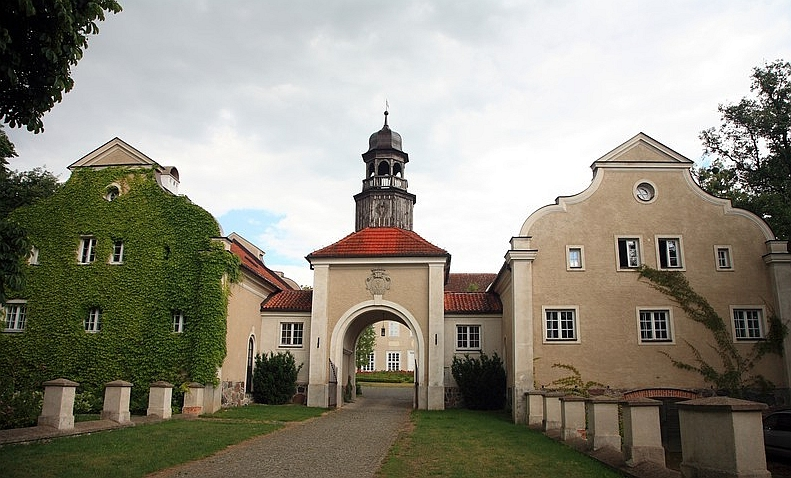
- Galiny Palace

- Location within Poland
- Coordinates: 54°10′N 20°50′E
- Country: Poland
- Voivodeship: Warmian-Masurian
- County: Bartoszyce
- Gmina: Bartoszyce
- First mentioned: 1386

Population
  - Total: 910
- Time zone: UTC+1 (CET)
  - Summer (DST): UTC+2 (CEST)
- Vehicle registration: NBA

Galiny (Polish: [ɡaˈlinɨ]; German: Gallingen) is a village in the administrative district of Gmina Bartoszyce, within Bartoszyce County, Warmian-Masurian Voivodeship, in northern Poland, close to the border with the Kaliningrad Oblast of Russia.

== History ==
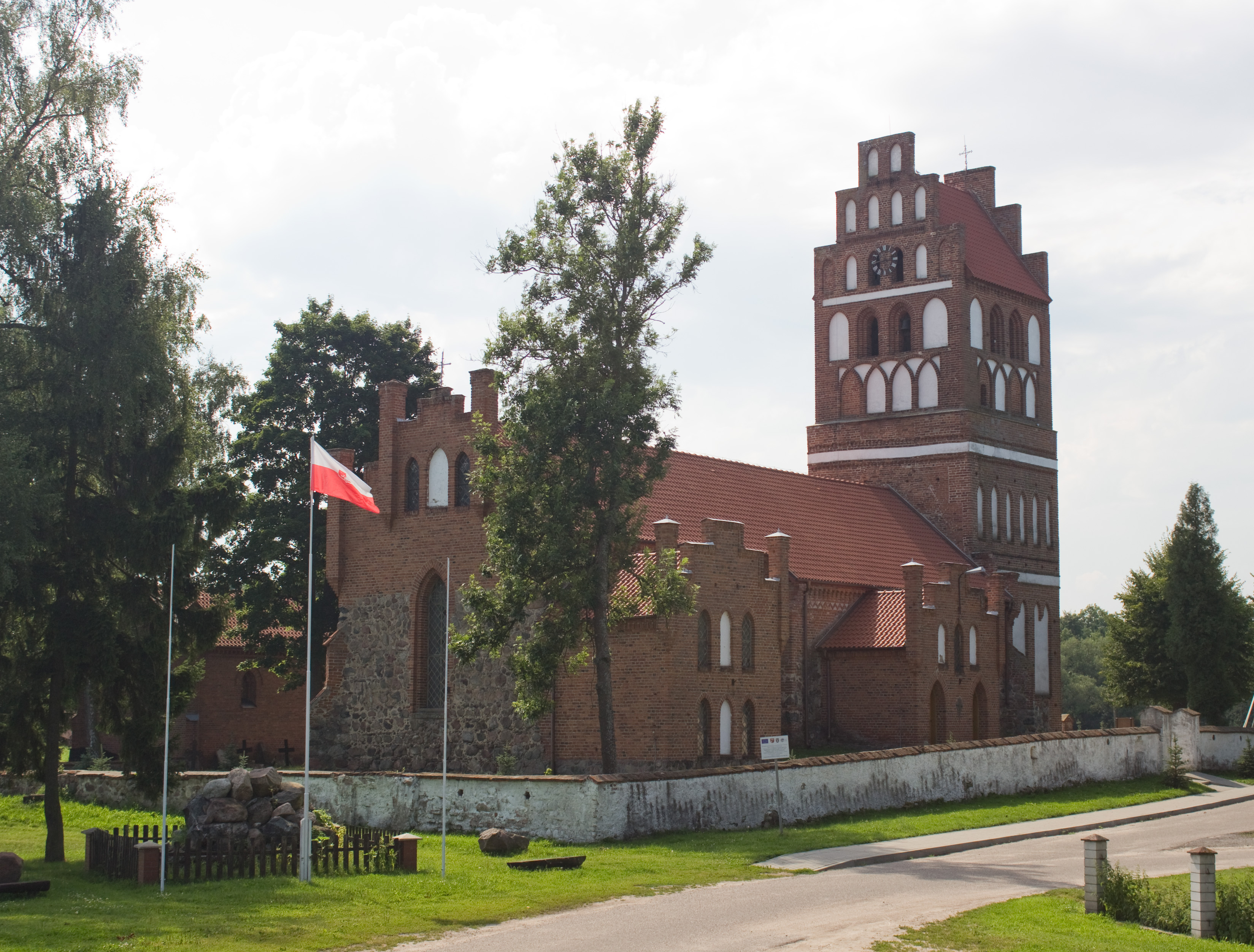
Church of the Assumption

The village was first mentioned in 1336. In 1454, King Casimir IV Jagiellon incorporated the region into the Kingdom of Poland. After the subsequent Thirteen Years' War (1454–1466), it was a part of Poland as a fief held by the Teutonic Order. In 1468, the Grand Master of the Teutonic Knights, Heinrich Reuss von Plauen gave the village as a fief to Went von Eulenburg (Yleburg), a member of the House of Wettin, and it remained the property of the Eulenburg family until 1945, when the last owner, Botho Wendt zu Eulenburg, was deported to the Soviet Union.

From 1945 to 1958 the village was administratively located in the Iławka County in the Masurian District and Olsztyn Voivodeship.

Galiny Palace dates back to 1589 and was built by Botho zu Eulenburg. Initially, it had the shape of a "U" and was surrounded by a water-filled moat and a drawbridge. The manor was not destroyed throughout World War II but slowly fell into ruins in the postwar years. Since 1995, it has been reconstructed and is today used as a hotel.
