= Rawa County =

Rawa County Powiat rawski
- County
- Flag Coat of arms

- Location within the voivodeship
- Coordinates (Rawa Mazowiecka): 51°46′N 20°15′E
- Country: Poland
- Voivodeship: Łódź
- Seat: Rawa Mazowiecka
- Gminas: Total 6 (incl. 1 urban): Rawa Mazowiecka; Gmina Biała Rawska; Gmina Cielądz; Gmina Rawa Mazowiecka; Gmina Regnów; Gmina Sadkowice

Area
  - Total: 646.6 km^{2} (249.7 sq mi)

Population (2006)
  - Total: 49,443
  - Density: 76.47/km^{2} (198.0/sq mi)
  - Urban: 20,825
  - Rural: 28,618
- Car plates: ERW
- Website: www.powiatrawski.pl

Rawa County (Polish: powiat rawski) is a unit of territorial administration and local government (powiat) in Łódź Voivodeship, central Poland. It came into being on January 1, 1999, as a result of the Polish local government reforms passed in 1998. Its administrative seat and largest town is Rawa Mazowiecka, which lies 54 kilometres (34 mi) east of the regional capital Łódź. The only other town in the county is Biała Rawska, lying 17 km (11 mi) east of Rawa Mazowiecka.

The county covers an area of 646.6 square kilometres (249.7 sq mi). As of 2006 its total population is 49,443, out of which the population of Rawa Mazowiecka is 17,643, that of Biała Rawska is 3,182, and the rural population is 28,618.

== Neighbouring counties ==
Rawa County is bordered by Skierniewice County and Żyrardów County to the north, Grójec County to the east, and Tomaszów County to the south.

== Administrative divisions ==
The county is subdivided into six gminas (one urban, one urban-rural and four rural). These are listed in the following table, in descending order of population.

Gmina	Type	Area (km^{2})	Population (2006)	Seat
Rawa Mazowiecka	urban	13.7	17,643	
Gmina Biała Rawska	urban-rural	208.4	11,546	Biała Rawska
Gmina Rawa Mazowiecka	rural	164.0	8,573	Rawa Mazowiecka *
Gmina Sadkowice	rural	121.1	5,725	Sadkowice
Gmina Cielądz	rural	93.9	4,100	Cielądz
Gmina Regnów	rural	45.6	1,856	Regnów
* seat not part of the gmina
