= Big Brother (franchise) =

Dutch reality game show franchise

- International logo of Big Brother since 2019
- Created by: John de Mol Jr.
- Original work: Big Brother (Netherlands)
- Owner: Banijay Entertainment
- Years: 1999–present

Big Brother is a reality competition television franchise created by John de Mol Jr., first broadcast in the Netherlands in 1999 and subsequently syndicated internationally beginning in 2000. The show features contestants called "housemates" or "HouseGuests" who live together in a specially constructed house that is isolated from the outside world. The show has been cited as having had widespread influence on the status of television and celebrity.

The name is inspired by Big Brother from Nineteen Eighty-Four, as the housemates are continuously monitored during their stay in the house by live television cameras as well as personal audio microphones. Throughout the course of the competition, they are voted out of the house (usually on a weekly basis) until only one remains and wins the grand prize.

As of 5 August 2023, there have been 508 seasons of Big Brother in over 63 franchise countries and regions. English-language editions of the program are often referred to by its initials BB.

== Premise ==
The international Big Brother logo used from 1999 to 2018

At regular intervals, the housemates privately nominate a number of their fellow housemates whom they wish to be evicted from the house. The housemates with the most nominations are then announced, and viewers are given the opportunity to vote via telephone for the nominee they wish to be evicted or saved from eviction. The last person remaining is declared the winner.

Some more recent editions have since included additional methods of voting, such as voting through social media and smartphone applications. Occasionally, non-standard votes occur, where two houseguests are evicted at once or no one is voted out. In the earlier series of Big Brother, there were 10 contestants with evictions every two weeks. However, the British version introduced a larger number of contestants with weekly evictions. Most versions of Big Brother follow the weekly eviction format, broadcast over approximately three months for 16 contestants.

The contestants are required to do housework and are assigned tasks by the producers of the show (who communicate with the housemates via the omnipresent authority figure known to them only as "Big Brother"). The tasks are designed to test their teamwork abilities and community spirit. In some countries, the housemates' shopping budget or weekly allowance (to buy food and other essentials) depends on the outcome of assigned tasks.

== History ==
=== Name ===
The term Big Brother originates from George Orwell's novel Nineteen Eighty-Four, with its theme of continuous oppressive surveillance.

=== Creation ===
The first version of Big Brother was broadcast in 1999 on Veronica in the Netherlands. In the first season of Big Brother, the house was very basic. Although essential amenities such as running water, furniture, and a limited ration of food were provided, luxury items were often forbidden. This added a survivalist element to the show, increasing the potential for social tension. Nearly all later series provide a modern house for the contest with a Jacuzzi, sauna, VIP suite, loft, and other luxuries.

=== International expansion ===
The format has become an international TV franchise. While each country or region has its own variation, the common theme is that the contestants are confined to the house and have their every action recorded by cameras and microphones and that no contact with the outside world is permitted.

Most international versions of the show remain quite similar: their main format remains true to the original fly on the wall observational style with an emphasis on human relationships, to the extent that contestants are usually forbidden from discussing nominations or voting strategy. In 2001, the American version adopted a different format since the second season, where the contestants are encouraged to strategize to advance in the game; in this format, the contestants themselves vote to evict each other and a jury of evicted contestants vote for the winner. Occasionally, individual game twists and format changes may allow for some viewer voting, usually to give a game advantage to the Housemates selected by the viewer vote. Big Brother Canada, introduced in 2013, also follows the American format, while the Australian series also used an American-styled format when the series was rebooted in 2020, with the winner being decided by Australia's vote among the Finalist.

Other international versions have included aspects of the American format. In 2011, the British version controversially adopted the discussion of nominations before reversing this rule after a poll by Big Brother broadcaster Channel 5.

== Reception ==
=== Overview ===
From a sociological and demographic perspective, Big Brother allows an analysis of how people react when forced into close confinement with people outside of their comfort zone (having different opinions or ideals, or from a different socioeconomic group). The viewer has the opportunity to see how a person reacts from the outside (through the constant recording of their actions) and the inside (in the Diary or Confession Room). The Diary Room is where contestants can privately express their feelings about the game, strategy and the other contestants. The results range from violent or angry confrontations to genuine and tender connections (often including romantic interludes).

In 2011, Brazilian sociologist Silvia Viana Rodrigues wrote a thesis at the University of São Paulo analyzing reality shows as spectacles that proliferate rituals of suffering. She analyzes such rituals in various cultural products from Hollywood and Brazilian television, with special attention to Big Brother Brasil. When investigating the openly eliminatory and cruel face of the game, Silvia Viana points out that such characteristics are liable to be entertainment with great and crucial public engagement because such processes of elimination, competition, exclusion, the affirmation of the war of all against all, of self-management and personal self-control through socio-emotional skills, entrepreneurship, the banality of evil, the naturalization of torture, the "battle for survival" logic and the incorporation of Nazi language and elements are already part of contemporary social life, especially in the context of work under neoliberalism. The thesis was later published as a book.

In 2010, Bruno Roberto Campanella, a Brazilian communication scholar known for his studies on media reception and fan culture, he defended at the Federal University of Rio de Janeiro (UFRJ) the doctoral thesis Perspectives of Everyday Life: A Study of Fans of the Television Program Big Brother Brasil, in which he analyzed, through digital ethnography, the interactions and interpretations of Big Brother Brasil fans in online environments.

The research addresses themes such as authenticity, mediated everyday life, and the relationship between public and private spheres in reality television. The study gained public visibility and was featured by Rede Globo in an interview published on its institutional platform dedicated to academic outreach. There is no record of a professional or consultancy relationship with the program.

The show is notable for involving the Internet. Although the show typically broadcasts daily updates during the evening (sometimes criticized by viewers and former contestants for heavy editing by producers), viewers can also watch a continuous feed from multiple cameras on the Web in most countries. These websites were successful, even after some national series began charging for access to the video stream. In some countries, Internet broadcasting was supplemented by updates via email, WAP and SMS. The house is shown live on satellite television, although in some countries there is a 10–15 minutes delay to allow libelous or unacceptable content (such as references to people not participating in the program who have not consented to have personal information broadcast) to be removed.

Contestants occasionally develop sexual relationships; the level of sexual explicitness allowed to be shown in broadcast and Internet-feed varies according to the country's broadcasting standards.

=== Isolation ===
Big Brother contestants are isolated in the house, without access to television, radio, or the Internet. They are not permitted routine communication with the outside world. This was an important issue for most earlier series of the show. In more-recent series, contestants are occasionally allowed to view televised events (usually as a reward for winning at a task). In most versions of the program, books and writing materials are also forbidden, although exceptions are sometimes made for religious materials such as the Bible, Tanakh or the Qur'an. Some versions ban all writing implements, even items that can be used to write (such as lipstick or eyeliner). Despite the housemates' isolation, some contestants are occasionally allowed to leave the house as part of tasks. Contestants are permitted to leave the house in an emergency.

News from the outside world may occasionally be given as a reward. Additionally, news of extraordinary events from the outside world may be given to the Housemates if such information is considered important, such notable past examples include that of national election results, (along with Housemates being able participate in said elections, for countries with compulsory voting) the September 11 attacks, and the COVID-19 pandemic.

Contestants have regularly scheduled interactions with the show's host on eviction nights. Throughout each day, the program's producer, in the "Big Brother" voice, issues directives and commands to contestants. Some versions of the show allow private counselling sessions with a psychologist. These are allowed at any time and are often conducted by telephone from the Diary Room.

Season 16 of the Australian adaption of Big Brother has the house located inside the Gold Coast theme park Dreamworld, allowing patrons on certain rides to see into the house garden, with some overhead yelling to the housemates. Previous series at Dreamworld had the house located outside the theme parks grounds, separating the housemates from park visitors.

== Format changes and twists ==
=== Regional versions ===
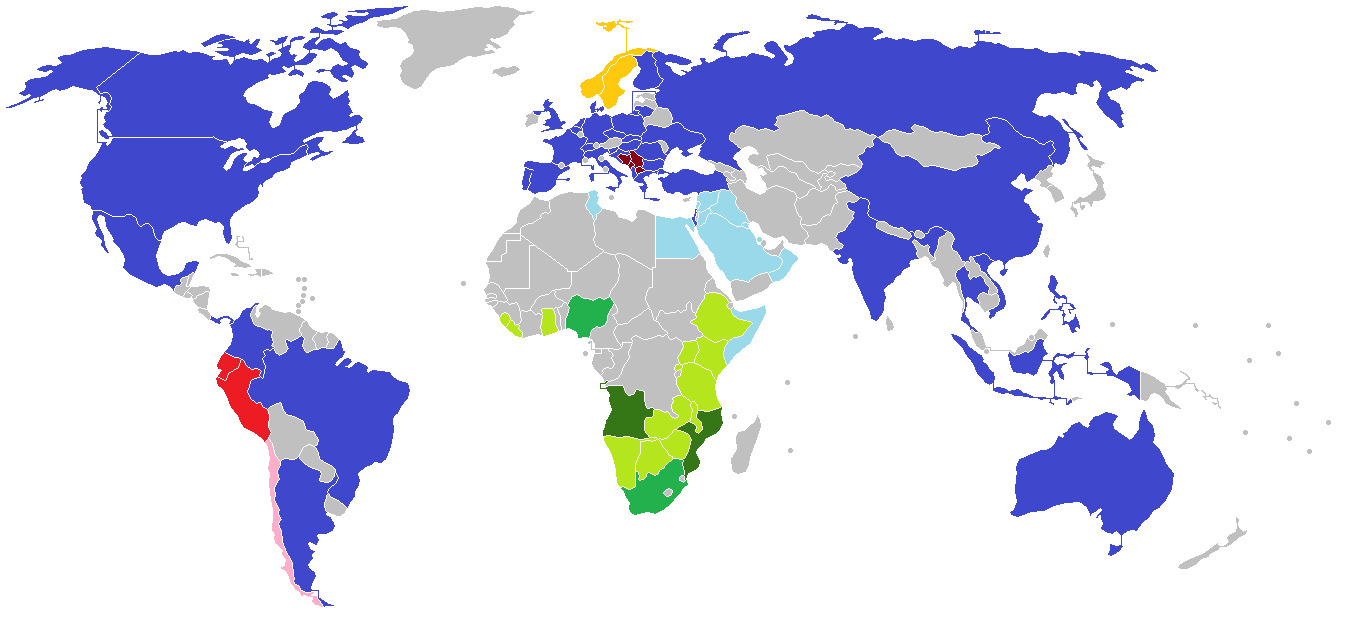
Locations of Big Brother versions: With individual franchises Part of Big Brother Africa Part of Secret Story Afrique Part of Big Brother Angola e Moçambique; Also part of Big Brother Africa With individual franchises; Also part of Big Brother Africa; Also part of Big Brother Titans Part of Big Brother: الرئيس With individual franchises; Also part of Gran Hermano del Pacífico Part of Veliki Brat With individual franchises; Also part of Veliki Brat With individual franchises; Also part of Big Brother of Norway and Sweden With individual franchises; Also part of Big Brother of Belgium and the Netherlands With individual franchises; Also part of Big Brother Česko & Slovensko

Due to the intelligibility of certain languages across several nations, various regional versions of Big Brother have been produced. Some countries have multiple franchises based on language, for example, the United States has English- and Spanish-language versions of the show.

=== Twists involving single franchises ===
==== Multiple areas and houses ====
In 2001, Big Brother 3 of the Netherlands introduced the "Rich and Poor" concept, in which the house is separated into a luxurious half and a poor half, and two teams of housemates compete for a place in the luxurious half. The Dutch version continued this concept to the end of its fourth season. Other versions later followed and introduced a similar concept, of which some have their own twists: Africa (in 2010, 2011, 2012 and 2013), Albania (in 2010), Australia (in 2003 and 2013), Balkan States (in VIP 2010 and 2011), Brazil (2009–present), Canada (2013–2024), Denmark (in 2003), Finland (in 2009 and 2014), France (in 2009, 2011–2017), Germany (in 2003, 2004–05, 2005–06, 2008, 2008–09 and since Celebrity 2014), Greece (in 2003), India (in 2012 and 2013), Israel (in 2009), Italy (in 2006 and 2007), Norway (in 2003), Philippines (in 2009, Teen 2010 and 2011), Poland (in 2002), Portugal (in VIP 2013 and 2016), Slovakia (in 2005), Slovenia (in 2008, 2015 and 2016), Scandinavia (in 2005), South Africa (in 2014), Spain (in VIP 2004, 2008, 2009–10 and 2010), United Kingdom (in 2002, Celebrity 2007, 2008, Celebrity 2013 and 2016), United States (2009–present) and Tamil Nadu, India (2023–24)

In 2011–12, the seventh Argentine series added La Casa de al Lado ("The House Next Door"), a smaller, more luxurious house which served multiple functions. The first week it hosted four potential housemates, and the public voted for two of them to enter the main house. The second week, two pairs of twins competed in the same fashion, with only one pair allowed in. Later, the third, fourth and fifth evicted contestants were given the choice of staying on their way out and they competed for the public's vote to reenter the house. Months later, after one of the contestants left the house voluntarily, the House Next Door reopened for four contestants who wanted to reenter and had not been in such a playoff before. The House Next Door was also used in other occasions to accommodate contestants from the main house for limited periods of time, especially to have more privacy (which of course could be seen by the public).

The ninth Brazilian season featured the "Bubble": a glass house in a shopping mall in Rio de Janeiro where four potential housemates lived for a week. Later in the season, a bubble was built inside the Big Brother house, with another two housemates living in it for a week until they were voted in and the glass house dismantled. The Glass House was reused in the eleventh season, featuring five evicted housemates competing for a chance to join the house again, and in the thirteenth season, with six potential housemates competing for two places in the main house. A dividing wall from the ninth season was reused in the fourteenth Brazilian season, when mothers and aunts of the housemates entered for International Women's Day and stayed in the house for six days, though they could not be seen by the housemates. Every season brings back the glass house. Some editions also featured an all-white panic room, where contestants were held until one of them decided to quit the show.

In the fourth English-Canadian season, two house guests were evicted and moved into a special suite where they were able to watch the remaining house guests. A week later, the houseguests were required to unanimously decide which of them to bring back into the house.

==== Evil Big Brother ====
In 2004, the fifth British series introduced a villainous Big Brother with harsher punishments, such as taking away prize money, more difficult tasks and secret tricks. This concept has also been used in Australia, Belgium, Bulgaria, Croatia, Finland, Germany, Greece, Italy, the Netherlands, South America, Scandinavia, Serbia, Spain, Thailand, Philippines and Mexico.

==== Twin or triplet housemates ====
In 2004, the fifth American season introduced twins who were tasked with secretly switching back and forth in the house; they were allowed to play the game as individual house guests after succeeding at the deception for four weeks. This twist was reused in the seventeenth American season without the deception element – the pair simply needed to survive five weeks without being evicted. HouseGuests who discovered this twist could use the twins to their strategic advantage.

This twin or triplet twist was used in several countries. Some made modifications to this twist; others have had twins in the house together without this element of secrecy. The following are the countries that have featured twins or triplets: Australia (in 2005), Germany (in 2005–06), Brazil (in 2006 and 2015), Bulgaria (in 2006, 2012 and VIP 2017), United Kingdom (in 2007, Celebrity 2011, Celebrity 2012, 2013, 2015, 2016 and Celebrity 2017), France (in 2007, 2011, 2013, 2015 and 2016), Spain (in 2007 and 2013), Poland (in 2007 and 2019), India (in 2008), Africa (in 2009), Balkan Region (in 2009 and 2013), Philippines (in 2009, Teen 2012 and 2014), Portugal (in 2010 and 2012), Israel (in 2011), Ukraine (in 2011), Argentina (in 2011 and 2016), Albania (in 2013, 2017, Celebrity 2021–22 and Celebrity 2022–23), Greece (in 2020) and Kosovo (in Celebrity 2022–23).

==== Pairs competitions ====
Several versions of the program feature variations of the housemates competing in pairs:

- In the sixth American season, each HouseGuest had a secret partner with whom had a pre-existing relationship, with each pair being informed that they were the only secret pair. While each player was nominated and evicted as an individual, each pair had the goal of reaching being the Final 2 HouseGuests remaining. Should a secret pair succeed in this goal, the prize money awarded to the winner and runner-up would jackpot – the winner's prize doubling from $500,000 to $1,000,000 and the runner-up's prize quintupling from $50,000 to $250,000.
- During the tenth week of the seventh British series, the housemates were paired with their "best friend" in the house and had to nominate and face eviction as couples.
  - The ninth American season added a romantic theme by pairing up the HouseGuests with their "Soulmate" and having them compete as couples. This twist was active for the first three weeks of the season.
  - The 13th American season featured a further twist to the pairs format by introducing the "Dynamic Duos" twist, where contestants formed pairs that would be nominated together but evicted separately. The nominee not evicted would be immune from further nomination until there were 10 HouseGuests remaining, at which point the pairs were dissolved. This twist was repeated in 24th American season, except with the surviving partner joining another pair to compete alongside.
- The second season of the Philippine teen edition also featured the parents or guardians of the teens staying in the house; if a teen housemate was evicted, the coinciding parent or guardian would also be evicted. A similar twist was used on the fourth Greek season was dubbed Big Mother; it featured housemates accompanied by their mothers.
- In the ninth season of Indian Big Brother, Big Boss: Double Trouble, contestants entered the house tied up in pairs by the waist. They had joint chairs, beds, spoons, and even mugs. The twelfth season of Indian Big Brother, Bigg Boss 12 also featured jodis (pairs) who were teacher-student, policeman-lawyer, sister-sister, etc.
- In the ninth Albania season, all the housemates wherever were in couples and for the first time in the history of Big Brother Albania, the winner was a couple (Danjel Dedndreaj and Fotini Derxho).

==== Secret missions ====
Secret missions are a common element of the show since their introduction during the sixth British series. During these missions, one or more housemates are set a task from Big Brother with the reward of luxuries for the household and/or a personal reward if the task is successful. Some versions of Big Brother have secret tasks presented by another character who lives in plain sight of the housemate. Such characters include Marsha the Moose (from BB Canada) and Surly the Fish (from BB Australia).

The third Belgian season introduced a mole. This housemate was given secret missions by Big Brother.

The sixth Australian season featured The Insider. Voted on by Australia, the Housemates deemed "The Most Competitive" became The Insider and had to complete secret missions tasked by Big Brother in order to win immunity from nomination voting and hence, eviction. Failure in a mission would result in automatic nomination.

The eighth American season introduced "America's Player", where a selected house guest must complete various tasks (determined by public vote) in secret for the duration of their stay in the house in exchange for a cash reward. It was repeated in the tenth American season for a week. The eleventh American season featured Pandora's Box, in which the winning head of household was tempted to open a box, with unintended consequences for the house. The twelfth American season featured a saboteur, who entered the house to wreak havoc with tasks suggested by viewers. The sixteenth American season featured "Team America", in which three houseguests were selected to work as a team to complete tasks (determined by public voting) for a cash reward; this continued for the entire season despite the eviction of a team member.

The fourth Argentine series added a telephone in the living room. This telephone rang once a week for ten seconds, and the person to pick up the receiver was given an order or news from Big Brother (which typically no other housemate could hear). The order could be beneficial or detrimental, but a refused order resulted in the nomination for eviction. If nobody picked up the call, the whole house would be nominated for eviction.

==== Opening night twists ====
Since Big Brother 2, the British series has opened with a twist. This has included having potential housemates being voted upon by the public for one to enter the house (Big Brother 2 and Big Brother 13); public voting for least-favourite housemates, with the housemates choosing between two nominees to evict (Big Brother 3); first-night nominations (Big Brother 4 & Big Brother 13); suitcase nominations (Big Brother 5); Unlucky Housemate 13 (Big Brother 6); Big Brother Hood (Big Brother 7); an all-female house and a set of twins as contestants (Big Brother 8); a couple entering as housemates, who must hide their relationship (Big Brother 9); housemates having to earn housemate status (Big Brother 10, with an altered version of the twist appearing in Big Brother 21); a mole entering the house with an impossible task (Big Brother 11); Pamela Anderson entering as a guest for 5 days (Big Brother 12); a professional actor posing as a housemate and a mother and daughter as contestants (Big Brother 14); one contestant gets a pass to the final (Big Brother 15); first night eviction (Big Brother 16); two houses with "the other house" featuring enemies from the main house housemates past (Big Brother 17); Jackie Stallone entering a house containing her son's ex-wife Brigitte Nielsen (Celebrity Big Brother 3); a "fake celebrity" (a civilian contestant pretending to be a celebrity) in a celebrity edition (Celebrity Big Brother 4); a visit from Jade Goody's family (Celebrity Big Brother 5) and unlocked bedrooms allowing housemates to immediately claim beds with the last housemate becoming the Head of House (Celebrity Big Brother 6).

A common opening twist is to introduce only a cast of a single sex on the premiere of the show while having members of the opposite sex introduced over the next few days. The eighth British series first used this twist with an initial all-female house, adding a male housemate two days later. The same twist was used in the fourth Bulgarian series, and an all-male premiere was used on Big Brother Africa 4. The second Belgian season was used a similar twist in 2001, where eleven male housemates and one female housemate entered the house on launch night and the second female housemate entered the house on the third day.

==== Fake evictions ====
The fifth British series introduced fake evictions, where Big Brother misleads housemates that eviction has taken place, only for the "evicted" housemate to reenter the house sometime later.

In the eighth British series, one housemate was evicted, interviewed and sent back into the house.

In the fifth Philippine season, four housemates were fake-evicted and stayed in a place called bodega. In the second batch of the eight Philippine season, four housemates were fake-evicted due to losing their duel challenge and temporarily stayed in a secret room. In the adult edition of the tenth Philippine season, two housemates, and later three more, were fake evicted after failing in two different Ligtask challenges and temporarily stayed in the task room until the end of their weekly task.

The concept of the fake-eviction was incorporated into the Australian series for the first time in the sixth Australian season, when housemates Camilla Severi and Anna Lind-Hansen were both fake-evicted in Day 8 and were moved into a secret room in the house, the Revenge Room. Severi and Lind-Hansen could see who nominated them for eviction and were given the opportunity to wreak havoc upon the house and those who nominated them by constructing extravagant tasks for the housemates to complete and for making mess in the house when they were not looking. Severi and Lind-Hansen returned to the house in a live special on Day 10. In the tenth Australian season, Benjamin Zabel was fake evicted for 24 hours before being returned to the house with immunity from eviction for that week. In the eleventh Australian season Travis Lunardi was fake-evicted and received advice from Benjamin Zabel for 24 hours; Travis returned to the house after a 3-day absence with immunity from eviction for that week.

In the thirteenth Brazilian series, Anamara Barreira was fake evicted. She was removed and put into a small private apartment without the other housemates knowing she was still in the house. After 24 hours, she returned to the house as Head of Household and with immunity from eviction that week. In the sixteenth Brazilian series, Ana Paula Renault was similarly fake evicted, put into a small private apartment, and returned after 48 hours with immunity from eviction that week. In the eighteen Brazilian series, Gleici Damasceno was similarly fake evicted, put into a small private apartment, and returned after 72 hours with immunity from eviction and with the power to put someone to eviction.

In the first Turkish series, there is a fake eviction in week 10.

The Indian version Bigg Boss sees frequent fake evictions. In Bigg Boss Kannada season 4, winner Pratham and co-contestant Malavika were kept in secret room after fake eviction for one week and they were both allowed in the Bigg Boss house.

Similarly, in Bigg Boss Kannada season 5, firstly Jaya Srinivasan and Sameer Acharya were put into the secret room after fake eviction for one week and then Sameer Acharya was allowed into the house, but Jaya Srinivasan was evicted from the secret room itself. In the same season, the runner up Divakar was put into the secret room after fake eviction for one week.

==== Coaches ====
The fourteenth American season had four house guests from past seasons return to coach twelve new house guests, playing for a separate prize of $100,000. However, in a reset twist, they opted to join the normal game alongside the other house guests.

==== Red button ====
The seventh Argentine series incorporated a red button into the Confession Room, which would sound an alarm throughout the house. This button was to be used when a contestant wanted to leave the house voluntarily, and the contestant would be given five minutes to leave the house. A red button is also used in Secret Story series, however, in this case whoever presses the button will try to guess someone's secret.

==== Legacy rewards or penalties ====
In Celebrity Hijack UK, evicted housemates were given the opportunity to choose if a "ninja" delivered good or bad gifts to the house. Later that year, the eighth Australian series introduced the Housemate Hand Grenade, where an evicted housemate decided which remaining housemate received a penalty. A similar punishment used on Big Brother Africa was called the Molotov Cocktail, Dagger or Fuse.

==== Most valuable player ====
The fifteenth American season allowed viewers to vote for a house guest to be made M.V.P., who then secretly nominates a third houseguest for eviction (in addition to the two selected by the Head of Household).

In a further twist introduced part-way through the MVP twist, the viewers themselves decided who the third nominee would be, with the HouseGuests still thinking one of their own is the MVP. Like many such twists, this was ended halfway into the season as the pool of contestants shrank.

==== Multiple heads of household ====
The sixteenth and seventeenth American seasons featured two Heads of Household every week and had four houseguests nominated for eviction. There was also a "Battle of the Block" competition where the two sets of nominees competed to save themselves; the winning pair not only saved themselves but dethroned the Head of Household who nominated them, who was then vulnerable as a replacement nominee if a veto was used. It is also used in specific weeks in Brazil since Big Brother Brasil 16 where the HOH's have to choose which HoH will get R$10,000 and who is the one that will win immunity.

==== America's Favorite HouseGuest ====
In the American version, each season there are three cash prizes: $750,000 for the winner, $75,000 for second, and $50,000 for who was voted by the viewers to be America's Favorite HouseGuest.

==== Multiple winners ====
In 2011, Big Brother Africa season 6 was the first season of Big Brother to have two winners, each getting US$200,000.

In 2012, the four finalists from Gran Hermano 12+1 (Spain) were given the chance to choose a formerly evicted housemate to be their partner. The companion of the winner became the "+1 winner" and received a secondary prize of €20,000.

In 2015, the sixth Philippine season, also had two winners; one from the teens and one from the regular adults. Each of which received PHP1,000,000.

Bigg Boss 8 (India) ended with a twist, where the top five contestants were crowned 'champions'. The season was extended by 35 days (total 135) as a spin-off called Bigg Boss Halla Bol, where ex-contestants from previous seasons entered the house to compete with the five champions.

==== Reserve housemates ====
The fourth Philippine season introduced the concept of having reserved housemates, those of whom are short-listed auditioners who were given a chance to be a housemate by completing tasks assigned by Big Brother. It was eventually done also in the eighth Philippine season where the reserved housemates were placed in a camp (a separate House but is just adjacent to the Main House) and that reserved housemate must compete amongst other reserved housemates while gaining points by participating in various tasks, including those that required the participation of doing such tasks outside of the Big Brother House premises. As the eviction was done weekly, once an official housemate is evicted from the Main House, the housemate(s) with the most points earned for that particular week crossovers to the Main House and becomes an official housemate.

These reserved housemates twist was also used in Argentina's seventh season and Brazil's ninth season.

==== Big Brother Zoom ====
In 2020, due to the COVID-19 pandemic, the Big Brother Portugal revival started with a twist, where all the contestants were isolated in different apartments for 14 days, in line with World Health Organisation (WHO) recommendations. Cameras were filming them 24 hours a day as usual, and they were able to communicate with each other and host Cláudio Ramos using tablets.

=== Twists involving multiple franchises ===
==== Housemate exchanges ====
In 2002, the Mexican and Spanish editions (BBM1 and GH3) made temporary housemate exchanges. Mexico's Eduardo Orozco swapped with Spain's Andrés Barreiro for 7 days. In 2010, the first 2-housemate exchange was held by Spain and Italy (GH11 and GF10). Gerardo Prager and Saray Pereira from Spain were swapped with Carmela Gualtieri and Massimo Scattarella of Italy for 7 days.

In later years, several housemate exchanges were done around the world: Argentina (GH3) and Spain (GH4), Ecuador (GH1) and Mexico (BBM2), and Africa (BBA1) and United Kingdom (BB4) in 2003; Scandinavia (BB2) and Thailand (BBT2) in 2006; Philippines (PBB2) and Slovenia (BB1), and Argentina (GH5) and Spain (GH9) in 2007; Africa (BBA3) and Finland (BB4) in 2008; Finland (BB5) and Philippines (PBB3) in 2009; Finland (BB6) and Slovenia (BBS1) in 2010; Spain (GH12) and Israel (HH3) in 2010–11; Finland (BB7) and Norway (BB4) in 2011; Argentina (GH7) and Israel (HH4) in 2012; Mexico (BB4) and Spain (GH16) in 2015; and Spain (GHVIP5) and Brazil (BBB17) in 2017.

==== Evicted housemate exchanges ====
In 2003, Mexico's Isabel Madow (BB VIP2) and Spain's Aída Nízar (GH5) were swapped for 7 days. This twist was also done between Russia (BBR1) and Pacific (GHP1) in 2005, and Argentina (GH4) and Brazil (BBB7) in 2007.

==== Other exchanges ====
In 2009, as part of the casting process for Italy's GF9, Doroti Polito and Leonia Coccia visited Spain's GH10.

In 2012, four contestants from Denmark's BB4 visited Sweden's BB6 and competed in a Viking-themed challenge. The Danish team won and 'kidnapped' Swedish contestant Annica Englund to the Denmark house for the following week.

In 2012, evicted housemate Laisa Portella of Brazil (from BBB12) was a guest on Spain's Gran Hermano 13 for a week; the following week, non-evicted Noemí Merino of GH13 stayed in the Brazilian Big Brother house for 5 days.

In 2016, Big Brother UK housemate Nikki Grahame and Big Brother Australia housemate Tim Dormer were voted in by Canada to be houseguests on the 4th season of Big Brother Canada. Similarly, Big Brother UK housemate Jade Goody appeared as a housemate on the 2nd season of Bigg Boss Hindi.

Big Brother Australia (2015) contestant Priya Malik joined Bigg Boss 9 (India) the same year as a wild card.

In 2017, GHVIP5 contestant Elettra Lamborghini visited Brazil's BBB17.

In 2019, the winner of Italy's GF15, Alberto Mezzetti visited Brazil's BBB19.

In 2022, Bindhu Madhavi, 4th Runner-up of Bigg Boss Tamil 2017 made her entry as a contestant in a Telugu back to win spin-off named Bigg Boss Non-Stop and emerged as the winner of that show respectively.

After winning the debut season of Bigg Boss Marathi (regional version of Big Brother), winner Megha Dhade made her entry in Bigg Boss season 12 as a wild card contestant.

After winning season 2 of Bigg Boss Marathi (regional version of Big Brother), winner Shiv Thakare made her entry in Bigg Boss 16.

In 2021, Shamita Shetty who was a contestant on Bigg Boss 3 re-appeared as a contestant firstly in the first season of Bigg Boss OTT and later in Bigg Boss 15.

==== Evicted housemate visits ====
Anouska Golebiewski, an evicted housemate from the United Kingdom (housemate from BB4) visited Australia (BB3) in 2003. In 2005, United Kingdom (Nadia Almada of BB5) visited Australia (BB5) again. In 2006, United Kingdom (Chantelle Houghton of CBB4) visited Germany (BBG6). This twist was used in later years by other countries: Africa (Ricardo Ferreira of BBA3) visited Brazil (BBB9) in 2009; Germany (Annina Ucatis and Sascha Schwan of BBG9) visited the Philippines (PBB3), and Italy (George Leonard and Veronica Ciardi of GF10) visited Albania (BB3) in 2010; Sweden (Martin Granetoft and Peter OrrmyrSara Jonsson of BB5) visited Norway (BB4) in 2011; Brazil (Rafael Cordeiro of BBB12) visited Spain (GH12), and Argentina (Agustín Belforte of GH4) visited Colombia (GH2) in 2012; United States (Dan Gheesling of BB10/BB14) visited Canada (BB1 and the BB2 Jury) in 2013; Canada (Emmett Blois of BB1) visited South Africa (BBM3) in 2014; and Spain (Paula Gonzalez of GH15) visited Mexico (BBM4) in 2015.

A similar event took place between the United States and Canada in 2014 wherein Rachel Reilly (from BB12/BB13) made a video chat to Canada (BB2). Rachel Reilly also appeared on Big Brother Canada's side show, which airs after the eviction episode.

==== Housemates competing in another country ====
There were occasions that a former housemate from one franchise participated and competed in a different franchise: Daniela Martins of France (SS3) competed in Portugal (SS1); Daniel Mkongo of France (SS5) competed in Italy (GF12); Brigitte Nielsen of Denmark (BB VIP) competed in the United Kingdom (CBB3); Jade Goody of the United Kingdom (BB3, BB Panto, and CBB5) competed in India (BB2); Sava Radović of Germany (BB4) competed in the Balkan States (VB1); Nikola Nasteski of the Balkan States (VB4) competed in Bulgaria (BB All-Stars 1); Žarko Stojanović of France (SS5) competed in the Balkan States (VB VIP5); Željko Stojanović of France (SS5) competed in the Balkan States (VB VIP5); Kelly Baron of Brazil (BBB13) competed in Portugal (BB VIP); Lucy Diakovska of Bulgaria (VIP B4) competed in Germany (PBB1); Leila Ben Khalifa of Italy (GF6) competed in France (SS8); Priya Malik of Australia (BB11) competed in India (BB9); Tim Dormer of Australia (BB10) and Nikki Grahame of the United Kingdom (BB7, UBB) competed in Canada (BB4) after beating Jase Wirey of the United States (BB5, BB7) and Veronica Graf of Italy (GF13) in a public vote; Leonel Estevão-Luto of Africa (BB4) competed in Angola & Mozambique (BB3); Frankie Grande of the United States (BB16) competed in the United Kingdom (CBB18); Fanny Rodrigues of Portugal (SS2) competed in France (SS10); and Tucha Anita of Angola (BB3); Amor Romeira of Spain (GH9) competed in Portugal (SS6) and Alain Rochette of Spain (GH17) competed in France (SS11); Despite being American, Brandi Glanville competed first in the United Kingdom (CBB20) then later competed in first Celebrity series in the United States (CBB1); Aída Nizar of Spain (GH5 and GHVIP5) competed in Italy (GF15); Ivana Icardi of Argentina (GH9) competed in Italy (GF16); Gianmarco Onestini of Italy (GF16) competed in Spain (GHVIP7); Michael Terlizzi of Italy (GF16) competed in Spain (GHVIP8); Heidi Baci of Italy (GF17) competed in Albania (BBVIP3).

=== Multiple-franchise competitions ===
Series participants	Prize	Points	Winner	Date
BB10 Germany; BB11 United Kingdom	A screening of the 2010 FIFA World Cup (round of 16) Germany vs. England game	After five penalties, the score was 1–1 and the game went to sudden death. After 36 penalties, German housemate Robert shot the ball wide and UK housemate Ife scored, winning 2–1.	United Kingdom BB11	26 June 2010

==== Eurovision Song Contest ====
Team and Song	Jury's points				Dates					Winner
Team and Song	Italy GF11	Greece BB5	Argentina GH6	Total	Tests	Israel Performance	Spain Performance	Ratings	Closed	Winner
GH12: "A-Ba-Ni-Bi"	12	12	12	36	30 December 2010 to 4 January 2011	5 January 2011	6 January 2011	7 January 2011	8 January 2011	GH12
HH3: "Bandido"	10	10	10	30	30 December 2010 to 4 January 2011	5 January 2011	6 January 2011	7 January 2011	8 January 2011	GH12

== Special editions ==
=== Celebrity and VIP Big Brother ===
The Big Brother format has been adopted in some countries; the housemates are local celebrities, and the shows are called Celebrity Big Brother or Big Brother VIP. In some countries, the prize money normally awarded to the winning housemate is donated to a charity, and all celebrities are paid to appear in the show as long as they do not voluntarily leave before their eviction or the end of the series. The rest of the rules are nearly the same as those of the original version.

==== Variations ====
The 2006 Netherlands series was entitled Hotel Big Brother. This variation introduced a group of celebrity hoteliers and a Big Boss, who run a hotel and collect money for charity without nominations, evictions or a winner.

Another variation appeared in the UK in early 2008, entitled Big Brother: Celebrity Hijack. Instead of being housemates the celebrities became Big Brother himself, creating tasks and holding nominations with the help of Big Brother. The housemates were considered by the producers "Britain's most exceptional and extraordinary" 18- to 21-year-olds. The prize for the winner of the series was £50,000.

In 2009, VIP Brother 3 Bulgaria introduced the concept of celebrities competing for charitable causes, which changed each week. Housemates were sometimes allowed to leave the house to raise money for the charity. Ten out of Thirteen seasons of Bigg Boss (the Indian version of Big Brother) have been celebrity-only seasons. The 10th season of Big Boss had celebrities put up against commoners, where a commoner ultimately won.

=== American format ===
The American and Canadian versions of Big Brother differ from most global versions of the series. The American series began in 2000 with the original Dutch format—i.e., housemates, or HouseGuests, as they are styled in the United States, nominating each other for eviction and the public voting on evictions and the eventual winner. However, due to both poor ratings and the concurrent popularity of Survivor, a gameplay-oriented format was introduced in the second season, with HouseGuests allowed to strategize, politic and collude to survive eviction, with the entire nomination and eviction process being determined by the HouseGuest themselves.

Each week the HouseGuests compete in several competitions in order to win power and safety inside the house, before voting off one of the HouseGuests during the eviction. The main elements of the format are as follows:

- Head of Household (HoH): At the start of each week in the house, the HouseGuests compete for the title of Head of Household, often shortened to simply HoH. The Head of Household for each week is given luxuries such as their own personal bedroom and the use of an MP3 player but is responsible for nominating two of their fellow HouseGuests for eviction. The Head of Household would not be able to compete in the following week's Head of Household competition; this excludes the final Head of Household competition of the season.
- Power of Veto (PoV): After the nominees are determined, the Power of Veto competition is played, with the winner receiving the Power of Veto. If a HouseGuest chooses to exercise the Power of Veto, the Head of Household is responsible for naming a replacement nominee. The holder of the Power of Veto is saved from being nominated as the replacement nominee. Only six of the HouseGuests compete for the Power of Veto each week; the Head of Household and both nominations compete, as well as three others selected by a random draw. The PoV was introduced in the third American season
- Eviction: On eviction night, all HouseGuests must vote to evict one of the nominees, with the exception of the nominees and the Head of Household. The eviction vote is by secret ballot, with HouseGuests casting their votes orally in the Diary Room. In the event of a tied vote, the Head of Household will cast a tie-breaking vote publicly. The nominee with the majority of the votes is evicted from the house.

Before the sixteenth American season, HouseGuests competed in a Have/Have-Not challenge similar to the shopping tasks on Big Brother UK and other international editions. The winners become Haves and enjoy a full pantry of food, while Have-Nots, will be left with a staple diet of "slop" (fortified oatmeal), sleep in designated uncomfortable beds and take cold showers. In later seasons, the Haves & Have-Nots are determined either by the HoH themself or by the results of the HoH Competition.

When only two contestants remain, a jury formed of the most recently evicted HouseGuests (generally seven or nine) votes which of the two finalists wins the grand prize. Beginning in the fourth (2003) American season, jury members were sequestered off-site so that they would not be privy to the day-to-day goings-on in the house. (Celebrity Big Brother US does not sequester its jury members—all evicted celebrity HouseGuests vote on the winner.). The final Head of Household competition is split into three parts; the winners of the first two rounds compete in the third and final round. Once only two HouseGuests remain, the members of the jury cast their votes for who should win the series.

In addition, American and Canadian Big Brother do not air a live launch show, as is customary in international editions—by the time the network show and live online feeds begin airing, it is not uncommon for at least one HouseGuest to already have been evicted. Also, the North American editions currently air only three times a week, compared with daily or six days a week for the recently rebooted British franchise. As a result, the TV episodes focus primarily on the main events regarding the gameplay and house politics versus the day-to-day goings-on in the house; to see the latter, watching the live feeds is necessary.

In 2013, English-speaking Canada introduced its own version of the show on the cable channel Slice; the series moved to Global TV for its third (2015) season. The show followed the American format but with more elaborate twists and greater viewer participation in the game. Secret tasks were introduced, usually presented by the show's mascot, "Marsha the Moose"; also, as in most global franchises, Big Brother was a distinct character who interacted with the HouseGuests. The French Canadian version mostly followed the American/Anglophone Canadian format, but the public could evict a housemate on some occasions and decided the winner.

The 2020 iteration of the Big Brother Australia series adopted a slightly altered version of the American format (having previously used the international format) while pre-recording the series months in advance. A "Nomination Challenge" is held to determine who holds the power to nominate for that round, with the winner naming three Nominations for Eviction. During each eviction, all Housemates (excluding the Nominating Housemate) vote to evict. There is no rule prohibiting individuals from holding Nomination Power consecutively between weeks, and no Power of Veto is held. Additionally, the Australian public still decided the winner between the final 3. This format was utilised this format for 5 seasons between 2020 and 2023. The 2025 iteration of the show returned to the international format.

Big Brother Brasil combines the American/Canadian and international formats. Brazil votes on evictions and the winner, but housemates compete for HoH, Power of Immunity, and Power of Veto; there is also a weekly shopping competition. HoH nominates one housemate for eviction, while the rest of the house nominates a second housemate. The winner of the Power of Immunity competition gets to choose someone to be safe from nomination.

The pilot for Big Brother China, which premiered exclusively online in 2015, had housemates voting on evictions but the public voting for the winner. A similar format was used for Big Brother: Over the Top, an online-only spin-off of the American series that ran in 2016.

The nineteenth series of Big Brother UK saw the adaption of the "Game Changer" competition which is very similar to the Power of Veto competition. The winner of this competition has the opportunity to save a nominee from eviction. Like the PoV, there are six people that play in the "Game Changer" competition. The process of how the contestants are chosen is different as the people who have been nominated play in the competition along with the richest housemate. If there are empty left in the competition, then the richest housemate hand picks who will playing in that weeks "Game Changer" competition. The winner of the competition, like the PoV, has the option to save housemate from eviction for the week or not use the power at all. Unlike the PoV however, if the winner does save someone then no replacement nominee was named leaving the remaining nominees up for eviction and facing the public vote.

=== Other editions ===
The Big Brother format has been otherwise modified in some countries:

- Big Brother: All-Stars (Belgium, 21 days; Bulgaria: Season 1–5, 27–29 days; United States, 72–85 days; United Kingdom, 18 days; French Canada, 64 days; Africa, 91 days; Spain, 56 days; Portugal Secret Story: Season 1–4, 22–50 days): Previous housemates from previous seasons compete. Belgium was the first country to have an All-Stars season (2003). Bulgaria was the first country to complete 3 All-Stars seasons (2014). Portugal was the first country to complete 4 All-Stars seasons (2015). Portugal was the first country to complete 5 All-Stars seasons (2017). Portugal was the first country to complete 6 All-Stars seasons (2018).
- Big Brother: Reality All-Stars (Sweden, 6 days; Denmark, 32 days; Spain, 56 days): Contestants from different reality shows, including Big Brother, compete.
- Big Brother: You Decide / Big Brother: Back in the House / Big Brother: Try Out (Poland: Season 1–2, 7–13 days; Norway, 9 days; Serbia, 7 days): Housemates, new or old, compete for a spot in the next regular season without nominations or evictions.
- Teen Big Brother (United Kingdom, 10 days; Philippines: Season 1–4, 42–91 days): Teenagers 13 and older compete.
- Big Brother: All In (Philippines: Season 11, 13): A mix of teenagers, regular adults, and celebrities compete in one season. A variation, Big Brother: Lucky 7 and Big Brother: Otso, has three to four batches of housemates stay inside until a number for each batch is left and is joined by other members of other batches to form one new batch.
- Secret Story (France, Lithuania, Portugal, Netherlands, Peru, Albania, Spain and Africa): Each housemate has a secret.
- Christmas Editions:
  - Big Brother Panto (United Kingdom, 11 days): Housemates from the previous series spent time in the Big Brother House to perform a pantomime at the series' end.
  - Big Brother Reindeer Games (United States, 6 Days): Former Houseguests reunite to compete in a series of Christmas themed challenges for a grand prize.
- Big Brother – The Village (Germany: Season 6, 363 days): The village had a class system of bosses, assistants and servants, living in separate houses, who competed in mixed teams; winning bosses could promote employees, while losing bosses became servants. Cash prizes were awarded weekly in an ongoing contest.
- Big Brother Family (Bulgaria: 81 days): Whole families entered the house with their spouses, children and relatives. They received a salary for their stay and the winning family received a cash prize, a car and an apartment.

There are also "test runs", with a group of celebrities (or journalists) living in the house for several days to test it. There are occasions where people who have auditioned for the show are also put in the house, most notably in the British edition, where many housemates claim to have met before. These series have been televised in Argentina, Bulgaria, Czech Republic, Germany, Mexico, the Pacific region, the Philippines and Spain. In some cases, it is not broadcast, but in others, such as the American edition, it is used as a promotional tool.

== Versions ==
Currently airing
An upcoming season
Status unknown
No longer airing

Country/Region	Official name	Network(s)	Winner(s)	Presenter(s)
Africa (English-language: Angola, Botswana, Ethiopia, Ghana, Kenya, Liberia, Malawi, Mozambique, Namibia, Nigeria, Rwanda, South Africa, Sierra Leone, Tanzania, Uganda, Zimbabwe and Zambia)	Big Brother Africa	M-Net; Africa Magic; Mzansi Magic; DStv (live)	Season 1, 2003: Cherise Makubale; Season 2, 2007: Richard Dyle Bezuidenhout; Season 3, 2008: Ricardo Venancio; Season 4, 2009: Kevin Chuwang; Season 5, 2010: Uti Nwachukwu; Season 6, 2011: Karen Igho & Wendall Parsons; Season 7, 2012: Keagan Petersen; Season 8, 2013: Dillish Matthews; Season 9, 2014: Idris Sultan	Mark Pilgrim (1); Kabelo Ngakane (2–3); IK Osakioduwa (4–9)
Africa (French-language: Benin, Burkina Faso, Cameroon, Congo, DR Congo, Côte d'Ivoire, Gabon, Guinea, Madagascar, Mali, Niger, Senegal, Togo)	Secret Story Afrique	Canal+ Afrique	Season 1, 2024: Awa Sanoko; Season 2, 2025: Moctar Privé; Season 3, 2026: Current season	Jean-Michel Onnin; Stéphanelle
Albania	Big Brother Albania	Top Channel; DigitAlb (live)	Season 1, 2008: Arbër Çepani; Season 2, 2009: Qetsor Ferunaj; Season 3, 2010: Jetmir Salaj; Season 4, 2010–11: Ermela Mezuraj; Season 5, 2012: Arbër Zeka; Season 6, 2013: Anaidi Kaloti; Season 7, 2014: Nevila Omeri; Season 8, 2015: Vesel Kurtishaj; Season 9, 2017: Danjel Dedndreaj & Fotini Derxho	Arbana Osmani (1–7, 9); Ledion Liço (8)
Albania	Big Brother VIP	Top Channel; DigitAlb (live)	Season 1, 2021–22: Ilir Shaqiri; Season 2, 2022–23: Luiz Ejlli; Season 3, 2024: Egla Ceno; Season 4, 2024–25: Besart "Gjesti" Kelmendi; Season 5, 2025–26: Selin Bollati; Season 6, 2026–27: Upcoming season	Current; Ledion Liço (3–); Former; Arbana Osmani (1–2)
Angola; Mozambique	Big Brother Angola (1–2); Big Brother Angola e Moçambique (3)	Jango Magic; DStv	Season 1, 2014: Larama da Silva; Season 2, 2015: Luna Vambano & Mr. Norway Vunge; Season 3, 2016: Anderson Mistake & Papetchulo	Dicla Burity (1–3); Emerson Miranda (3)
Arab world (Bahrain, Egypt, Iraq, Jordan, Kuwait, Lebanon, Oman, Saudi Arabia, Somalia, Syria and Tunisia)	Big Brother: الرئيس; Big Brother: The Boss	MBC 2	Season 1, 2004: Discontinued	Razan Moughrabi
Argentina	Gran Hermano	Telefe; DirecTV (live; 1–3, 6–7, 11–); Cablevisión (live; 4–5); Multicanal (live; 4); TDT (live; 6–7); Pluto TV (live; 10)	Season 1, 2001: Marcelo Corazza; Season 2, 2001: Roberto Parra; Season 3, 2002–03: Viviana Colmenero; Season 4, 2007: Marianela Mirra; Season 5, 2007: Esteban Morais; Season 6, 2010–11: Cristian Urrizaga; Season 7, 2011–12: Rodrigo Fernández; Season 10, 2022–23: Marcos Ginocchio; Season 11, 2023–24: Bautista Mascia; Season 12, 2024–25: Santiago Algorta; Season 13, 2026: Solange Gómez; Season 14, 2027: Upcoming season	Main host: Soledad Silveyra (1–3); Jorge Rial (4–7); Mariano Peluffo (7); Santiago del Moro (10–); Debate: Juan Alberto Badía (1–3); Mariano Peluffo (4–7); Santiago del Moro (10–)
Argentina	Gran Hermano	América TV; DirecTV (live); Cablevisión (live)	Season 8, 2015: Francisco Delgado; Season 9, 2016: Luis Fabián Galesio	Main host: Jorge Rial; Debate: Pamela David
Argentina	Gran Hermano Famosos	Telefe; Cablevisión (live); Multicanal (live)	Season 1, 2007: Diego Leonardi	Main host: Jorge Rial; Debate: Mariano Peluffo
Australia	Big Brother	Network 10; 10 (VoD) (live stream; 16—)	Season 1, 2001: Ben Williams; Season 2, 2002: Peter Corbett; Season 3, 2003: Regina Bird; Season 4, 2004: Trevor Butler; Season 5, 2005: Greg Matthew; Season 6, 2006: Jamie Brooksby; Season 7, 2007: Aleisha Cowcher; Season 8, 2008: Terri Munro; Season 16, 2025: Coco Beeby; Season 17, 2026: Current season; Season 18, 2027: Upcoming season	Current; Mel Tracina (16–); Former; Gretel Killeen (1–7); Kyle Sandilands (8); Jackie O (8)
Australia	Big Brother	Nine Network	Season 9, 2012: Benjamin Norris; Season 10, 2013: Tim Dormer; Season 11, 2014: Ryan Ginns	Sonia Kruger
Australia	Big Brother	Seven Network	Season 12, 2020: Chad Hurst; Season 13, 2021: Marley Biyendolo; Season 14, 2022: Reggie Sorensen; Season 15, 2023: Tay & Ari Wilcoxson	Sonia Kruger
Australia	Celebrity Big Brother	Network 10	Season 1, 2002: Dylan Lewis	Gretel Killeen
Australia	Big Brother VIP	Seven Network	Season 1, 2021: Luke Toki	Sonia Kruger
Balkans (Bosnia and Herzegovina, Croatia, Montenegro, North Macedonia and Serbia)	Veliki Brat; Big Brother	Pink BH (1–4); Pink M (1–4); B92 (1–3, 5); A1 (3); Pink (4); RTL (4–5); OBN (5); RTRS (5); Sitel (5); Prva (5)	Season 1, 2006: Ivan Ljuba; Season 2, 2007: Discontinued; Season 3, 2009: Vladimir Arsić „Arsa"; Season 4, 2011: Marijana Čvrljak; Season 5, 2015: Darko "Spejko" Petkovski	Marijana Mićić (1, 3–4); Irina Vukotić (1, 3); Ana Grubin (2); Antonija Blaće (4–5); Sky Wikluh (5)
Balkans (Bosnia and Herzegovina, Croatia, Montenegro, North Macedonia and Serbia)	Veliki Brat VIP; Big Brother VIP	Pink M (1–4); Pink BH (1–4); B92 (1–2, 5); Pink (3–4); A1 (4); BN (5); Prva (5); OBN (5); Sitel (5)	Season 1, 2007: Saša Ćurčić „Đani"; Season 2, 2008: Mirjana „Mimi" Đurović; Season 3, 2009: Miroslav „Miki" Đuričić; Season 4, 2010: Milan Marić „Švaba"; Season 5, 2013: Žarko Stojanović	Ana Grubin (1–2); Irina Vukotić (1); Milan Kalinić (2–3); Marijana Mićić (3–5); Dragan Marinković (4)
Balkans (Bosnia and Herzegovina, Croatia, Montenegro, North Macedonia and Serbia)	Veliki Brat: Generalna Proba; Veliki Brat: General Rehearsal	B92	Season 1, 2006: Jelena Provči & Marko Miljković	Marijana Mićić
Belgium	Big Brother	Kanaal Twee	Season 1, 2000: Steven Spillebeen; Season 2, 2001: Ellen Dufour; Season 3, 2002: Kelly Vandevenne; Season 4, 2003: Kristof van Camp; Season 5, 2006: Kirsten Janssens; Season 6, 2007: Diana Ferrante	Walter Grootaers
Belgium	Big Brother (Netherlands and Belgium)	VIER/Play4; Telenet (live)	Season 1, 2021: Jill Goede; Season 2, 2022: Salar Abassi Abrassi; Season 3, 2023: Bart Vandenbroek; Season 4, 2024: Glenn Van Himst; Season 5, 2025: Jordy de Maar	Current; Geraldine Kemper; Tatyana Beloy (3–); Former; Peter Van de Veire (1–2)
Belgium	Big Brother VIPs	VTM; Kanaal Twee	Season 1, 2001: Sam Gooris; Season 2, 2006: Pim Symoens	No presenters
Belgium	Big Brother All-Stars	Kanaal Twee	Season 1, 2003: Heidi Zutterman	Walter Grootaers
Brazil	Big Brother Brasil	TV Globo; Multishow; Globoplay (live on PPV)	Season 1, 2002: Kleber de Paula; Season 2, 2002: Rodrigo Leonel; Season 3, 2003: Dhomini Ferreira; Season 4, 2004: Cida dos Santos; Season 5, 2005: Jean Wyllys; Season 6, 2006: Mara Viana; Season 7, 2007: Diego Gasques; Season 8, 2008: Rafinha Ribeiro; Season 9, 2009: Maximiliano Porto; Season 10, 2010: Marcelo Dourado; Season 11, 2011: Maria Melillo; Season 12, 2012: Fael Cordeiro; Season 13, 2013: Fernanda Keulla; Season 14, 2014: Vanessa Mesquita; Season 15, 2015: Cézar Lima; Season 16, 2016: Munik Nunes; Season 17, 2017: Emilly Araújo; Season 18, 2018: Gleici Damasceno; Season 19, 2019: Paula von Sperling; Season 20, 2020: Thelma Assis; Season 21, 2021: Juliette Freire; Season 22, 2022: Arthur Aguiar; Season 23, 2023: Amanda Meirelles; Season 24, 2024: Davi Brito; Season 25, 2025: Renata Saldanha; Season 26, 2026: Ana Paula Renault; Season 27, 2027: Upcoming season	Current; Tadeu Schmidt (22–); Former; Marisa Orth (1); Pedro Bial (1–16); Tiago Leifert (17–21)
Bulgaria	Big Brother	Nova Television; Nova+ (live; 1–4); Diema Family (live; 5)	Season 1, 2004–05: Zdravko Vasilev; Season 2, 2005: Miroslav Atanasov; Season 3, 2006: Lyubov Stancheva; Season 4, 2008: Georgi Alurkov; Season 5, 2015: Nikita Jönsson; Season 6, 2024: Mario Todorov; Season 7, 2025: David Bett	Current; Bashar Rahal (6–7); Aleksandra Bogdanska (6–7); Former; Niki Kunchev (1–3, 5); Evelina Pavlova (1–2); Milen Tsvetkov (4); Rumen Lukanov (4); Aleksandra Sarchadjieva (5)
Bulgaria	VIP Brother	Nova Television; Nova+ (live; 1–2); Diema 2 (live; 3); Diema Family (live; 4–6)	Season 1, 2006: Konstantin Slavchev; Season 2, 2007: Hristina Stefanova; Season 3, 2009: Deyan Slavchev – Deo; Season 4, 2012: Orlin Pavlov; Season 5, 2013: Stanka Zlateva; Season 6, 2014: Vladislav Karamfilov – Vladi Vargala; Season 7, 2015: Georgi Tashev – Gino Biancalana; Season 8, 2016: Miglena Angelova; Season 9, 2017: Yonislav Yotov – Toto; Season 10, 2018: Atanas Kolev	Niki Kunchev; Evelina Pavlova (1); Dimitar Rachkov (3); Maria Ignatova (3); Aleksandra Sarchadjieva (4–10); Miglena Angelova (9); Azis (10)
Bulgaria	Big Brother Family	Nova Television; Diema Family (live)	Season 1, 2010: Eli & Veselin Kuzmovi	Niki Kunchev
Bulgaria	Big Brother All Stars (1–4); Big Brother: Most Wanted (5–6)	Nova Television; Diema Family (live; 1–3)	Season 1, 2012: Nikola Nasteski – Lester; Season 2, 2013: Zlatka Dimitrova; Season 3, 2014: Todor Slavkov; Season 4, 2015: Desislava; Season 5, 2017: Georgi Tashev – Gino Biancalana; Season 6, 2018: Stefan Ivanov – Wosh MC	Niki Kunchev; Aleksandra Sarchadjieva; Azis (6)
Canada (English)	Big Brother Canada	Slice	Season 1, 2013: Jillian MacLaughlin; Season 2, 2014: Jon Pardy	Arisa Cox
Canada (English)	Big Brother Canada	Global	Season 3, 2015: Sarah Hanlon; Season 4, 2016: Nicholas & Philippe Paquette; Season 5, 2017: Kevin Martin; Season 6, 2018: Paras Atashnak; Season 7, 2019: Dane Rupert; Season 8, 2020: Discontinued; Season 9, 2021: Tychon Carter-Newman; Season 10, 2022: Kevin Jacobs; Season 11, 2023: Terrell "Ty" McDonald; Season 12, 2024: Bayleigh Pelham	Arisa Cox
Canada (English)	Big Brother Canada	CTV	Season 13, 2027: Upcoming season	Andrea Bain
Canada (French)	Loft Story	TQS	Season 1, 2003: Julie Lemay & Samuel Tissot; Season 2, 2006: Mathieu Baron & Stéphanie Bélanger; Season 3, 2006: Shawn-Edward, Jean-Philippe Anwar & Kim Rusk; Season 4, 2007: Mathieu Surprenant; Season 5, 2008: Charles-Éric Boncoeur	Renée-Claude Brazeau (1); Isabelle Maréchal (2); Marie Plourde (3–5)
Canada (French)	Loft Story: La Revanche; Loft Story: The Revenge	TQS	Season 6, 2009: Sébastien Tremblay	Pierre-Yves Lord
Canada (French)	Big Brother	V	Season 1, 2010: Vincent Durand Dubé	Chéli Sauvé-Castonguay
Canada (French)	Big Brother Célébrités	Noovo	Season 1, 2021: Jean-Thomas Jobin; Season 2, 2022: Stephanie Harvey; Season 3, 2023: Mona de Grenoble; Season 4, 2024: Danick Martineau; Season 5, 2025: Sinem Kara; Season 6, 2026: Gabrielle Côté; Season 7, 2027: Upcoming season	Marie-Mai Bouchard
Canada (French)	Big Brother: Le fantastique réveillon (1); Big Brother: Le Noovo réveillon (2– ) (Holiday special edition)	Noovo	Season 1, 2022: Félix-Antoine Tremblay; Season 2, 2023: Tammy Verge; Season 3, 2024: Fred Robichaud; Season 4, 2025: Brigitte Lafleur	Marie-Mai Bouchard
Canada (French)	Big Brother Célébrités: Les jeux d'été (Digital spin-off)	Noovo	Season 1, 2023: No Winner	Marie-Mai Bouchard
Canada (French)	Big Brother: Le Piège (Prank-based spin-off)	Crave	Season 1, 2025: No Winner; Season 2, 2026: No Winner	Marie-Mai Bouchard
Chile	Gran Hermano	Chilevisión	Season 1, 2023: Constanza Capelli; Season 2, 2024: Michelle Carvalho; Season 3, 2026–27: Upcoming season	Current; José Miguel Viñuela (3); Former; Diana Bolocco (1-2); Emilia Daiber (2); Julio Rodríguez (1)
China	室友一起宅 – Big Brother China; Housemates, Let's Stay Together	Youku.com; Tudou.com	Pilot season, 2015–16: Tan Xiangjun	Zhou Wentao (Live Final); Yang Ruilei (Live Final)
Colombia	Gran Hermano	Caracol Televisión	Season 1, 2003: Mónica Patricia Tejón	Adriana Arango
Colombia	Gran Hermano	Citytv Bogotá	Season 2, 2012: Diana Hernández	Agmeth Escaf
Colombia	La casa de los famosos Colombia; The House of the Famous Colombia	Canal RCN; ViX (live; 1)	Season 1, 2024: Karen Sevillano; Season 2, 2025: Andrés Altafulla; Season 3, 2026: Alejandro Estrada; Season 4, 2027: Upcoming season	Current; Carla Giraldo; Marcelo Cezán (2–); Former; Cristina Hurtado (1)
Croatia	Big Brother	RTL	Season 1, 2004: Saša Tkalčević; Season 2, 2005: Hamdija Seferović; Season 3, 2006: Danijel Rimanić; Season 4, 2007: Vedran Lovrenčić; Season 5, 2008: Krešimir Duvančić; Season 6, 2016: Romano Obilinović; Season 7, 2018: Antonio Orač	Daria Knez (1); Neno Pavinčić (1, 6); Boris Mirković (1–3); Renata Sopek (2–4); Antonija Blaće (2–5, 7); Filip Brajković (4); Marko Lušić (5); Korana Gvozdić (5); Marijana Batinić (6)
Croatia	Celebrity Big Brother	RTL	Season 1, 2008: Danijela Dvornik	Antonija Blaće; Marko Lušić
Czech Republic	Big Brother	TV Nova	Season 1, 2005: David Šín	Eva Aichmajerová (1); Lejla Abbasová (1); Leoš Mareš (1)
Czech Republic	Big Brother Česko & Slovensko (Czech Republic and Slovakia)	TV Nova; Oneplay; Voyo	Season 1, 2023–24: Stanislav Liška	Míra Hejda
Denmark	Big Brother	TvDanmark	Season 1, 2001: Jill Liv Nielsen; Season 2, 2001: Carsten B. Berthelsen; Season 3, 2003: Johnni Johansen	Lisbeth Janniche
Denmark	Big Brother	Kanal 5 The Voice TV (live; 4); 7'eren (live; 5–6)	Season 4, 2012: Amanda Heisel; Season 5, 2013: Bjørn Clausen; Season 6, 2014: David Feldstedt	Marie Egede (4); Anne Kejser (5); Oliver Bjerrehuus (6)
Denmark	Big Brother VIP	TvDanmark	Season 1, 2003: Thomas Bickham	Lisbeth Janniche
Denmark	Big Brother Reality All-Stars	TvDanmark	Season 1, 2004: Jill Liv Nielsen	Lisbeth Janniche
Ecuador	Gran Hermano	Ecuavisa	Season 1, 2003: David Burbano	Toty Rodríguez
Finland	Big Brother Suomi	Sub	Season 1, 2005: Perttu Sirviö; Season 2, 2006: Sari Nygren; Season 3, 2007: Sauli Koskinen; Season 4, 2008: Anniina Mustajärvi; Season 5, 2009: Aso Alanso; Season 6, 2010: Niko Nousiainen; Season 7, 2011: Janica Kortman; Season 8, 2012: Teija Kurvinen; Season 10, 2014: Andte Gaup-Juuso	Mari Sainio (Kakko) (1–2, 10); Vappu Pimiä (3–5); Susanna Laine (6–7); Elina Kottonen (6–8)
Finland	Big Brother Suomi	Nelonen; Jim (11; Daily recaps); Ruutu.fi (stream; live 24/7)	Season 11, 2019: Kristian Heiskari; Season 12, 2020: Joel Jämsinen; Season 14, 2021: Jasmiina Yildiz; Season 15, 2022: Reeo Tiiainen	Elina Kottonen (11–12, 14); Kimmo Vehviläinen (11–14); Alma Hätönen (11–12, 14); Anni Hautala (13, 15); Tinni Wikström (13); Sami Kuronen (15); Janni Hussi (15)
Finland	Big Brother Suomi	MTV3; MTV Katsomo (stream; live 24/7)	Season 16, 2026: Upcoming season	Jenni Poikelus
Finland	Julkkis Big Brother (9); Celebrity Big Brother; Big Brother Suomi VIP (13)	Sub	Season 9, 2013: Jori Kopponen	Mari Sainio
Finland	Julkkis Big Brother (9); Celebrity Big Brother; Big Brother Suomi VIP (13)	Nelonen; Ruutu.fi (stream; live 24/7)	Season 13, 2021: Petra Maarit Olli	Anni Hautala; Tinni Wikström; Kimmo Vehviläinen
France	Loft Story	M6	Season 1, 2001: Christophe Mercy & Loana Petrucciani; Season 2, 2002: Karine Delgado & Thomas Saillofest	Benjamin Castaldi
France	Secret Story	TF1; NT1 (daily recaps and aftershow: 9); TFX (aftershow: 12); CanalSat (live: 1); TF1+ (live feed: 12)	Season 1, 2007: Marjorie, Cyrielle & Johanna Bluteau; Season 2, 2008: Matthias Pohl; Season 3, 2009: Emilie Nefnaf; Season 4, 2010: Benoît Dubois; Season 5, 2011: Marie Garet; Season 6, 2012: Nadège Lacroix; Season 7, 2013: Anaïs Camizuli; Season 8, 2014: Leila Ben Khalifa; Season 9, 2015: Émilie Fiorelli; Season 12, 2024: Alexis André Jr.	Benjamin Castaldi (1–8); Christophe Beaugrand (9–); After Secret; Adrien Lemaître (3–9); Nadège Lacroix (7); Leila Ben Khalifa (9); Julie Taton (9–10); Emilie Fiorelli (10); Julien Geloën (11)
France	Secret Story	NT1/TFX; TF1 (live launch: 10—11, 13); TF1+ (live feed: 13)	Season 10, 2016: Julien Geloën; Season 11, 2017: Noré Tir; Season 13, 2025: Romy Loyez	Benjamin Castaldi (1–8); Christophe Beaugrand (9–); After Secret; Adrien Lemaître (3–9); Nadège Lacroix (7); Leila Ben Khalifa (9); Julie Taton (9–10); Emilie Fiorelli (10); Julien Geloën (11)
France	Secret Story	TMC; TF1 (live launch: 14); TF1+ (live feed: 14)	Season 14, 2026: Paola Cavalli	Benjamin Castaldi (1–8); Christophe Beaugrand (9–); After Secret; Adrien Lemaître (3–9); Nadège Lacroix (7); Leila Ben Khalifa (9); Julie Taton (9–10); Emilie Fiorelli (10); Julien Geloën (11)
Germany	Big Brother	RTL II; Single TV (2); RTL (2–3); MTV2 Pop (4–5); Tele 5 (4–6); 9Live (8); VIVA (5, 9); Premiere (live; 5–9); Clipfish (live; 10–11); Sky (live; 10–11)	Season 1, 2000: John Milz; Season 2, 2000: Alida Nadine Kurras; Season 3, 2001: Karina Schreiber; Season 4, 2003: Jan Geilhufe; Season 5, 2004–05: Sascha Sirtl; Season 6, 2005–06: Michael Knopf; Season 7, 2007: Michael Carstensen; Season 8, 2008: Silke Kaufmann; Season 9, 2008–09: Daniel Schöller; Season 10, 2010: Timo Grätsch; Season 11, 2011: Marc Sonnen	Percy Hoven (1); Oliver Geissen (2–3); Aleksandra Bechtel (4, 10–11); Ruth Moschner (5–6); Oliver Petszokat (6); Charlotte Karlinder (7–8); Miriam Pielhau (8–9); Sonja Zietlow (Opening show, 11)
Germany	Big Brother	sixx Sky (live; 12); 7TV (stream; 12); Joyn (live, daily recaps; 15–)	Season 12, 2015: Lusy Skaya; Season 15, 2025: Marcel Schiefelbein	Jochen Bendel; Elena Gruschka (15–); Jochen Schropp (15–); Melissa Khalaj (15–)
Germany	Big Brother	Sat.1 sixx (Weekly recaps; 13); Joyn (live, daily recaps; 14)	Season 13, 2020: Cedric Beidinger; Season 14, 2024: Marcus Bräuer	Jochen Schropp
Germany	Promi Big Brother	Sat.1 sixx (Daily recaps; 2–4, 6–8); IGTV (Daily recaps; 7–); Sat.1 emotions (1); Sky (live 3 hours; 1, live; 3) maxdome (live; 2); Bild (live; 4); 7TV (stream; 2–6); Joyn (stream; 7–; live feed; 11–)	Season 1, 2013: Jenny Elvers; Season 2, 2014: Aaron Troschke; Season 3, 2015: David Odonkor; Season 4, 2016: Ben Tewaag; Season 5, 2017: Jens Hilbert; Season 6, 2018: Silvia Wollny; Season 7, 2019: Janine Meissner; Season 8, 2020: Werner Hansch; Season 9, 2021: Melanie Müller; Season 10, 2022: Rainer Gottwald; Season 11, 2023: Yeliz Koc; Season 12, 2024: Leyla Lahouar; Season 13, 2025: Jimi Blue Ochsenknecht; Season 14, 2026: Maurice Dziwak; Season 15, 2027: Upcoming season	Current; Jochen Schropp (2–); Marlene Lufen (6–); Former; Cindy aus Marzahn (1); Oliver Pocher (1); Jochen Bendel (5)
Greece; Cyprus	Big Brother	ANT1	Season 1, 2001: Giorgos Triantafyllidis; Season 2, 2002: Alexandros Moskhos; Season 3, 2003: Thodores Jspógloy; Season 4, 2005: Nikos Papadopoulos	Andreas Mikroutsikos (1–3); Tatiana Stefanidou (4)
Greece; Cyprus	Big Brother	Alpha TV; Sigma TV; Nova (live)	Season 5, 2010–11: Giannis Foukakis	Roula Koromila
Greece; Cyprus	Big Brother	Skai TV; Sigma TV	Season 6, 2020: Anna-Maria Psycharaki; Season 7, 2021: Nikos Taklis; Season 8, 2025: Christos Ntentopoulos	Harry Varthakouris (6); Grigoris Gountaras (7); Natali Kakava (7); Petros Lagoutis (8)
Hungary	Big Brother	TV2	Season 1, 2002: Éva Párkányi; Season 2, 2003: Zsófi Tóth	Claudia Liptai; Attila Till
Hungary	Big Brother VIP	TV2	Season 1, 2003: Gábor Bochkor; Season 2, 2003: Lajos Boros; Season 3, 2003: Zolee Ganxsta	Claudia Liptai; Attila Till
Hungary	Való Világ powered by Big Brother	RTL+ (12; live stream; 11–12); RTL Kettő (8–11); RTL (live launch; 12); Cool TV (12)	Season 8, 2016: Soma Farkas; Season 9, 2018–19: Zsuzsanna Varga; Season 10, 2020–21: Vivien Szilágyi; Season 11, 2022–23: Krisztina Karnics; Season 12, 2024: Ádi Farkas	Current; Peti Puskás (9–); Csilla Megyeri (12–); Former; Bence Istenes (6–8); Anikó Nádai (8–11); Vanda Schumacher (11)
India (Hindi-language)	Bigg Boss (Television edition)	SET (1)	Season 1, 2006–07: Rahul Roy	Arshad Warsi
India (Hindi-language)	Bigg Boss (Television edition)	Colors TV (2–); Voot (live; 4–16); Jio Cinema (live; 17, 18); JioHotstar (live; 19–)	Season 2, 2008: Ashutosh Kaushik; Season 3, 2009: Vindu Dara Singh; Season 4, 2010–11: Shweta Tiwari; Season 5, 2011–12: Juhi Parmar; Season 6, 2012–13: Urvashi Dholakia; Season 7, 2013: Gauahar Khan; Season 8, 2014–15: Gautam Gulati; Season 9, 2015–16: Prince Narula; Season 10, 2016–17: Manveer Gurjar; Season 11, 2017–18: Shilpa Shinde; Season 12, 2018: Dipika Kakar; Season 13, 2019–20: Sidharth Shukla; Season 14, 2020–21: Rubina Dilaik; Season 15, 2021–22: Tejasswi Prakash; Season 16, 2022–23: MC Stan; Season 17, 2023–24: Munawar Faruqui; Season 18, 2024–25: Karan Veer Mehra; Season 19, 2025: Gaurav Khanna; Season 20, 2026: Current season	Current; Salman Khan (4–); Former; Shilpa Shetty (2); Amitabh Bachchan (3); Sanjay Dutt (5)
India (Hindi-language)	Bigg Boss Halla Bol (Spin-off)	Colors TV	Season 1, 2015: Gautam Gulati	Farah Khan
India (Hindi-language)	Bigg Boss OTT (Digital edition)	Voot (live; 1); JioCinema (live; 2–)	Season 1, 2021: Divya Agarwal; Season 2, 2023: Elvish Yadav; Season 3, 2024: Sana Makbul	Current; Anil Kapoor (3–); Former; Karan Johar (1); Salman Khan (2)
India (Kannada-language)	Bigg Boss Kannada (Television edition)	ETV Kannada (1)	Season 1, 2013: Vijay Raghavendra	Sudeepa
India (Kannada-language)	Bigg Boss Kannada (Television edition)	Asianet Suvarna (2)	Season 2, 2014: Akul Balaji	Sudeepa
India (Kannada-language)	Bigg Boss Kannada (Television edition)	Colors Kannada (3–4; 7–); Colors Super (4–6); Voot (live; 3–9); Jio Cinema (live; 10,11); JioHotstar (live;12–)	Season 3, 2015–16: Shruthi; Season 4, 2016–17: Pratham; Season 5, 2017–18: Chandan Shetty; Season 6, 2018–19: Shashi Kumar; Season 7, 2019–20: Shine Shetty; Season 8, 2021: Manju Pavagada; Season 9, 2022: Roopesh Shetty; Season 10, 2023–24: Karthik Mahesh; Season 11, 2024–25: Hanumantha Lamani; Season 12, 2025–26: Gilli Nata; Season 13, 2026: Current season	Sudeepa
India (Kannada-language)	Bigg Boss Mini Season (Spin-off)	Colors Kannada	Season 1, 2021: No Winner	Sudeepa
India (Kannada-language)	Bigg Boss Kannada OTT (Digital edition)	Voot (live; 1)	Season 1, 2022: Roopesh Shetty, Aryavardhan Guruji, Rakesh Adiga and Sanya Iyer	Sudeepa
India (Kannada-language)	Bigg Boss Agniparikshe (Spin-off)	Colors Kannada; JioHotstar	Season 1, 2026: No winner	Niranjan Deshpande
India (Malayalam-language)	Malayalee House	Surya TV	Season 1, 2013: Rahul Easwar	Revathi
India (Malayalam-language)	Bigg Boss Malayalam	Asianet; Hotstar (1,2); Disney+ Hotstar (live;3–6); JioHotstar (live; 7–)	Season 1, 2018: Sabumon Abdusamad; Season 2, 2020: Discontinued; Season 3, 2021: Manikuttan; Season 4, 2022: Dilsha Prasannan; Season 5, 2023: Akhil Marar; Season 6, 2024: Jinto Bodycraft; Season 7, 2025: Anumol RS; Season 8, 2026: Current season	Mohanlal
India (Malayalam-language)	Bigg Boss Agnipareeksha (Spin-off)	Asianet; JioHotstar	Season 1, 2026: No winner	Reneesha Rahiman
India (Bengali-language)	Bigg Boss Bangla	ETV Bangla	Season 1, 2013: Aneek Dhar	Mithun Chakraborty
India (Bengali-language)	Bigg Boss Bangla	Colors Bangla; Voot	Season 2, 2016: Joyjeet Banerjee	Jeet
India (Bengali-language)	Bigg Boss Bangla	Star Jalsha (3); JioHotstar (3)	Season 3, 2026: Current season	Sourav Ganguly
India (Tamil-language)	Bigg Boss Tamil (Television edition)	Star Vijay; Hotstar (1–3); Disney+ Hotstar (live;4–8); JioHotstar (live; 9–)	Season 1, 2017: Arav; Season 2, 2018: Riythvika; Season 3, 2019: Mugen Rao; Season 4, 2020–21: Aari Aarjunan; Season 5, 2021–22: Raju Jeyamohan; Season 6, 2022–23: Mohammed Azeem; Season 7, 2023–24: Archana Ravichandran; Season 8, 2024–25: Muthukumaran Jegatheesan; Season 9, 2025–26: Divya Ganesh; Season 10, 2026: Current season	Current; Vijay Sethupathi (8–); Former; Kamal Haasan (1–7)
India (Tamil-language)	Bigg Boss Ultimate (Digital edition)	Disney+ Hotstar (Live; 1)	Season 1, 2022: Balaji Murugadoss	Silambarasan
India (Tamil-language)	Bigg Boss The Common Man (Spin-off)	Star Vijay; JioHotstar	Season 1, 2026: No winner	Maya S. Krishnan
India (Telugu-language)	Bigg Boss Telugu (Television edition)	Star Maa; Hotstar (1–3); Disney+ Hotstar (live;4–8); JioHotstar (live; 9–)	Season 1, 2017: Siva Balaji; Season 2, 2018: Kaushal Manda; Season 3, 2019: Rahul Sipligunj; Season 4, 2020: Abijeet; Season 5, 2021: VJ Sunny; Season 6, 2022: L. V. Revanth; Season 7, 2023: Pallavi Prashanth; Season 8, 2024: Nikhil Maliyakkal; Season 9, 2025: Kalyan Padala; Season 10, 2026: Current season	Current; Nagarjuna (3–); Former; Jr. NTR (1); Nani (2)
India (Telugu-language)	Bigg Boss Non-Stop (Digital edition)	Disney+ Hotstar (live; 1)	Season 1, 2022: Bindu Madhavi	Nagarjuna
India (Telugu-language)	Bigg Boss Agnipariksha (Spin-off)	Star Maa; JioHotstar	Season 1, 2025: No winner; Season 2, 2026: No winner	Sreemukhi
India (Marathi-language)	Bigg Boss Marathi	Colors Marathi; Voot (live; 1–3); Jio Cinema (live; 5); Jio Hotstar (6)	Season 1, 2018: Megha Dhade; Season 2, 2019: Shiv Thakare; Season 3, 2021: Vishal Nikam; Season 4, 2022–23: Akshay Kelkar; Season 5, 2024: Suraj Chavan; Season 6, 2026: Tanvi Kolte	Current; Riteish Deshmukh (5-); Former; Mahesh Manjrekar (1–4)
Indonesia	Big Brother Indonesia	Trans TV	Season 1, 2011: Alan Wangsa	Ferdy Hasan; Indra Herlambang; Sarah Sechan; Shara Aryo
Israel	האח הגדול; HaAh HaGadol; Big Brother	Channel 2-Keshet; Hot (live) yes (live)	Season 1, 2008: Shifra Cornfeld; Season 2, 2009–10: Eliraz Sade; Season 3, 2010–11: Yaakov "Jackie" Menahem; Season 4, 2012: Yekutiel "Kuti" Sabag; Season 5, 2013: Tahounia Rubel; Season 6, 2014: Tal Gilboa; Season 7, 2015–16: Shay Mika Ifrah; Season 8, 2016–17: Avihai Ohana	Erez Tal (1–8); Assi Azar (1–6); Korin Gideon (7–8)
Israel	האח הגדול; HaAh HaGadol; Big Brother	Channel 13; Channel 26 (live)	Season 9, 2018: Israel Ogalbo; Season 10, 2020: Tikva Gidon; Season 11, 2020–21: Zehava Ben; Season 12, 2022: Talia Ovadia; Season 13, 2023: Yuval Maatook; Season 14, 2024: Or Ben David; Season 15, 2025: Yovel Levi; Season 16, 2026: Gal Rubin	Current; Liron Weizman; Guy Zu-Aretz (10–); Guest; Kevin Rubin (16); Former; Ofer Shechter (9); Asi Israelof (9)
Israel	VIP האח הגדול; HaAh HaGadol VIP; Big Brother VIP	Channel 2-Keshet; Hot (live); Yes (live)	Season 1, 2009: Dudi Melitz; Season 2, 2015: Moshik Afia	Erez Tal (1–2); Assi Azar (1–2)
Israel	VIP האח הגדול; HaAh HaGadol VIP; Big Brother VIP	Channel 13; Channel 26 (live)	Season 3, 2019: Asaf Goren; Season 4, 2021: Oren Hazan	Liron Weizman; Guy Zu-Aretz
Italy	Grande Fratello	Canale 5 Italia 1 (Daily recaps; 13–); Stream TV (live; 1–3); Sky (live; 4–5, 8–9); Mediaset Premium (live; 6–14); Mediaset Extra (live; 15–); La5 (live; 11–)	Season 1, 2000: Cristina Plevani; Season 2, 2001: Flavio Montrucchio; Season 3, 2003: Floriana Secondi; Season 4, 2004: Serena Garitta; Season 5, 2004: Jonathan Kashanian; Season 6, 2006: Augusto De Megni; Season 7, 2007: Milo Coretti; Season 8, 2008: Mario Ferretti; Season 9, 2009: Ferdi Berisa; Season 10, 2009–10: Mauro Marin; Season 11, 2010–11: Andrea Cocco; Season 12, 2011–12: Sabrina Mbarek; Season 13, 2014: Mirco Petrilli; Season 14, 2015: Federica Lepanto; Season 15, 2018: Alberto Mezzetti; Season 16, 2019: Martina Nasoni; Season 17, 2023–24: Perla Vatiero; Season 18, 2024–25: Jessica Morlacchi; Season 19, 2025: Anita Mazzotta	Current; Simona Ventura (19–); Former; Daria Bignardi (1–2); Barbara D'Urso (3–5, 15–16); Alessia Marcuzzi (6–14); Alfonso Signorini (17–18)
Italy	Grande Fratello VIP	Canale 5 Italia 1 (Daily recaps); Mediaset Extra (live); La5 (live)	Season 1, 2016: Alessia Macari; Season 2, 2017: Daniele Bossari; Season 3, 2018: Walter Nudo; Season 4, 2020: Paola Di Benedetto; Season 5, 2020–21: Tommaso Zorzi; Season 6, 2021–22: Jessica Hailé Selassié; Season 7, 2022–23: Nikita Pelizon; Season 8, 2026: Alessandra Mussolini; Season 9, 2026: Current season	Current; Ilary Blasi (1–3; 8—); Former; Alfonso Signorini (4–7)
Italy	The Couple - Una vittoria per due (Spin-off)	Canale 5 Italia 1 (Daily recaps); Mediaset Extra (live); La5 (live)	Season 1, 2025: Discontinued	Ilary Blasi
Kosovo	Big Brother VIP Kosova	Klan Kosova; Artmotion (live)	Season 1, 2022–23: Arkimed "Stresi" Lushaj; Season 2, 2023–24: Lumbardh Salihu; Season 3, 2024–25: Drilon Rama; Season 4, 2025–26: Londrim Mekaj; Season 5, 2026–27: Current season	Alaudin Hamiti; Jonida Vokshi
Lithuania	Paslapčių namai The House of Secrets	TV3	Season 1, 2013: Gintautas Katulis	Agnė Grigaliūnienė; Marijus Mikutavičius
Malta	Big Brother Malta	TVM; TVM+ GOPlus (live feed)	Season 1, 2025: Jay Vella; Season 2, 2027: Upcoming season	Ryan Borg; Josmar Gatt
Mexico	Big Brother México; Big Brother PM (4)	Televisa; Sky (live)	Season 1, 2002: Rocío Cárdenas; Season 2, 2003: Silvia Irabien; Season 3, 2005: Evelyn Nieto	Adela Micha (1–2); Verónica Castro (3)
Mexico	Big Brother México; Big Brother PM (4)	Canal 5 Sky (live)	Season 4, 2015: Eduardo "Chile" Miranda	Adela Micha
Mexico	Big Brother VIP	Televisa; Sky (live)	Season 1, 2002: Galilea Montijo; Season 2, 2003: Omar Chaparro; Season 3.1, 2004: Eduardo Videgaray; Season 3.2, 2004: Roxanna Castellanos; Season 4, 2005: Sasha Sökol	Víctor Trujillo (1); Verónica Castro (2–4)
Mexico	La casa de los famosos México; The House of the Famous Mexico	Las Estrellas; Canal 5 ViX (live)	Season 1, 2023: Wendy Guevara; Season 2, 2024: Mario Bezares; Season 3, 2025: Aldo de Nigris; Season 4, 2026: Mariana Ochoa; Season 5, 2027: Upcoming season	Galilea Montijo; Diego de Erice; Odalys Ramirez
Mongolia	Big Brother Mongolia	Mongol TV	Season 1, 2021: Enku Bulgan	Unknown
Netherlands	Big Brother (Original edition)	Veronica	Season 1, 1999: Bart Spring in 't Veld; Season 2, 2000: Bianca Hagenbeek	Rolf Wouters (1); Daphne Deckers (1); Esther Duller (2); Beau Van Erven Dorens (2)
Netherlands	Big Brother (Original edition)	Yorin	Season 3, 2001: Sandy Boots; Season 4, 2002: Jeanette Godefroy	Patty Brard (3); Martijn Krabbé (4)
Netherlands	Big Brother (Original edition)	Talpa	Season 5, 2005: Joost Hoebink; Season 6, 2006: Jeroen Visser	Bridget Maasland (5–6); Ruud de Wild (5)
Netherlands	Big Brother (Netherlands and Belgium)	RTL 5 Videoland (stream; live)	Season 1, 2021: Jill Goede; Season 2, 2022: Salar Abassi Abrassi; Season 3, 2023: Bart Vandenbroek; Season 4, 2024: Glenn Van Himst; Season 5, 2025: Jordy de Maar	Current; Geraldine Kemper; Tatyana Beloy (3-); Former; Peter Van de Veire (1–2)
Netherlands	Big Brother VIPs (1); Hotel Big Brother (2)	Veronica	Season 1, 2000: No winner	Unknown
Netherlands	Big Brother VIPs (1); Hotel Big Brother (2)	Talpa	Season 2, 2006: No winner	Caroline Tensen
Netherlands	Secret Story	Net5	Season 1, 2011: Sharon Hooijkaas	Renate Verbaan; Bart Boonstra
Nigeria	Big Brother Nigeria (1); Big Brother Naija (2–8)	M-Net; DStv (live)	Season 1, 2006: Katung Aduwak	Olisa Adibua; Michelle Dede
Nigeria	Big Brother Nigeria (1); Big Brother Naija (2–8)	Africa Magic; GOtv; DStv (live)	Season 2, 2017: Michael "Efe" Ejeba; Season 3, 2018: Miracle Ikechukwu Igbokwe; Season 4, 2019: Mercy Eke; Season 5, 2020: Olamilekan "Laycon" Agbeleshe; Season 6, 2021: Hazel Oyeze "Whitemoney" Onou; Season 7, 2022: Ijeoma Josephina "Phyna" Otabor; Season 8, 2023: Ilebaye Odiniya; Season 9, 2024: Kingsley "Kellyrae" Sule; Season 10, 2025: Opeyemi "Imisi" Ayanwale; Season 11, 2026: Temitope "Temi Nkem" Chigbue	Ebuka Obi-Uchendu
Nigeria	Big Brother Titans (Nigeria and South Africa)	Africa Magic; DStv (stream; live)	Season 1, 2023 : Khosi Twala	Lawrence Maleka; Ebuka Obi-Uchendu
Norway	Big Brother	TVN	Season 1, 2001: Lars Joakim Ringom; Season 2, 2002: Veronica Agnes Roso; Season 3, 2003: Eva Lill Baukhol	Arve Juritzen (1–2); Trygve Rønningen (3)
Norway	Big Brother	TV 2 Bliss	Season 4, 2011: Tine Barstad	Petter Pilgaard; Sarah Natasha Melbye
Pacific Region (Chile, Ecuador and Peru)	Gran Hermano del Pacífico	RedTeleSistema; RED Televisión; ATV	Season 1, 2005: Juan Sebastián López	Lorena Meritano (Main); Álvaro Ballera & Álvaro García (Regional); Janine Leal (Regional); Juan Francisco Escobar (Regional)
Pakistan	Tamasha	ARY Digital; ARY Zap	Season 1, 2022: Umer Aalam; Season 2, 2023: Aruba Mirza; Season 3, 2024: Malik Aqeel; Season 4, 2025: Saif Ali Khan; Season 5, 2026: Babrik Shah	Adnan Siddiqui
Panama	Big Brother Panamá	TVN	Season 1, 2016: Katherine Sandoval	Rolando Sterling; Gaby Garrido
Paraguay	Gran Hermano Paraguay	Telefuturo	Season 1, 2027: Upcoming season	TBA
Peru	La Casa de Los Secretos; The House of Secrets	Frecuencia Latina	Season 1, 2012: Álvaro de la Torre	Carla García; Jason Day
Philippines	Pinoy Big Brother	Current GMA Network (12–) Former; A2Z (9–11); TV5 (9, 11); Kapamilya Channel (9–11); ABS-CBN (1–8); TFC (Worldwide); Kumu (live; 9–10); Lazada (live; 11); Sky Cable (live; 1–4); Studio 23 (live; 1–3)	Season 1, 2005: Nene Tamayo; Season 2, 2007: Beatriz Saw; Season 3, 2009–10: Melisa Cantiveros; Season 4, 2011–12: Slater Young; Season 5, 2014: Daniel Matsunaga; Season 6, 2015: Miho Nishida & Jimboy Martin; Season 7, 2016–17: Maymay Entrata; Season 8, 2018–19: Yamyam Gucong; Season 9, 2020–21: Liofer Pinatacan; Season 10, 2021–22: Anji Salvacion; Season 11, 2024: Fyang Smith; Season 12, 2026: Current season	Current; Bianca Gonzalez (2–); Robi Domingo (4–); Melisa Cantiveros (8–); Enchong Dee (6, 9–); Alexa Ilacad (11–); Gabbi Garcia (12); Michael Sager (12); Former; Toni Gonzaga (1–10); Kim Chiu (8–11); Maymay Entrata (9–10); Richard Juan (9–10); Edward Barber (9–10); Mariel Rodriguez (1–3, 7); John Prats (5); Alex Gonzaga (5, 8); Willie Revillame (1)
Philippines	Pinoy Big Brother: Celebrity Edition	Current GMA Network (3–) Former; ABS-CBN (1–2); TFC (Worldwide); Sky Cable (live; 1–2); Studio 23 (live; 1–2)	Season 1, 2006: Keanna Reeves; Season 2, 2007–08: Ruben Gonzaga; Season 3, 2025: Brent Manalo & Mika Salamanca; Season 4, 2025–26: Caprice Cayetano & Lella Ford	Current; Luis Manzano (1, 4–); Bianca Gonzalez (2–); Robi Domingo (3–); Melai Cantiveros (3–); Kim Chiu (3–); Enchong Dee (3–); Alexa Ilacad (3–); Gabbi Garcia (3–); Mavy Legaspi (3–); Former; Toni Gonzaga (1–2); Mariel Rodriguez (1–2)
Philippines	Pinoy Big Brother: Teen Edition	ABS-CBN (1–4); TFC (Worldwide); Sky Cable (live; 1–4); Studio 23 (live; 1–3)	Season 1, 2006: Kim Chiu; Season 2, 2008: Ejay Falcon; Season 3, 2010: James Reid; Season 4, 2012: Myrtle Abigail Sarrosa	Bianca Gonzalez (1–4); Mariel Rodriguez (1–3); Toni Gonzaga (2–4); Luis Manzano (2); Robi Domingo (4); John Prats (4)
Poland	Big Brother	TVN	Season 1, 2001: Janusz Dzięcioł; Season 2, 2001: Marzena Wieczorek; Season 3, 2002: Piotr Borucki	Grzegorz Miecugow (1–3); Martyna Wojciechowska (1–3); Andrzej Sołtysik (2–3)
Poland	Big Brother	TV4	Season 4, 2007: Jolanta Rutowicz; Season 5 (part 2), 2008: Janusz Strączek	Jakub Klawiter (4–5); Karina Kunkiewicz (4); Małgorzata Kosik (5)
Poland	Big Brother	TVN 7	Season 6, 2019: Magda Wójcik; Season 7, 2019: Kamil Lemieszewski	Agnieszka Woźniak-Starak (6); Gabi Drzewiecka (7)
Poland	Big Brother VIP	TV4	Season 5 (part 1), 2008: Jarosław Jakimowicz	Jakub Klawiter; Małgorzata Kosik
Portugal	Big Brother	TVI; TVI Reality (live; 5–); TVI Internacional (5); TVI Eventos (live; 1)	Season 1, 2000: Zé Maria Seleiro; Season 2, 2001: Henrique Guimarães; Season 3, 2001: Catarina Cabral; Season 4, 2003: Fernando Geraldes; Season 5, Spring 2020: Soraia Moreira; Season 6, Autumn 2020: Zena Pacheco; Season 7, 2021: Ana Barbosa; Season 8, 2022: Miguel Vicente; Season 9, 2023: Francisco Monteiro; Season 10, 2024: Inês Morais; Season 11, 2025: Luís Gonçalves	Current; Cláudio Ramos (5; 7; 10–); Former; Teresa Guilherme (1–4; 6); Manuel Luís Goucha (7); Cristina Ferreira (8–9)
Portugal	Big Brother Famosos (1–2, 4–); Big Brother VIP (3)	TVI; TVI Direct (live; VIP)	Season 1, 2002: Ricardo Vieira; Season 2, 2002: Vítor Norte; Season 3, 2013: Pedro Guedes; Season 4, 2022: Francisco "Kasha" Pereira; Season 5, 2022: Bernardo Sousa	Current; Cristina Ferreira (4–); Former; Teresa Guilherme (1–3)
Portugal	Big Brother: Duplo Impacto; Big Brother: Double Impact	TVI; TVI Reality (live)	Season 1, 2021: Joana Albuquerque	Teresa Guilherme; Cláudio Ramos
Portugal	Big Brother: Desafio Final; Big Brother: Final Challenge	TVI; TVI Reality (live)	Season 1, 2022: Bruna Gomes; Season 2, 2024: Bruno Savate	Current; Cláudio Ramos (2–); Former; Cristina Ferreira (1)
Portugal	Big Brother Verão; Big Brother Summer	TVI; TVI Reality (live)	Season 1, 2025: Jéssica Vieira; Season 2, 2026: Sara Alves	Maria Botelho Moniz
Portugal	Big Brother: All Stars	TVI; TVI Reality (live)	Season 1, 2026: Current season	Maria Botelho Moniz
Portugal	Secret Story: Casa dos Segredos; Secret Story: House of Secrets	TVI; TVI Reality (live; 6–); TVI Direct (live; 1–5)	Season 1, 2010: António Queirós; Season 2, 2011: João Mota; Season 3, 2012: Rúben Boa Nova; Season 4, 2013: Luís Nascimento; Season 5, 2014: Elisabete Moutinho; Season 6, 2016: Helena Patrício; Season 7, 2018: Tiago Rufino; Season 8, 2024: Diogo Alexandre; Season 9, 2025: Pedro Jorge; Season 10, 2026: Eva Pais	Júlia Pinheiro (1); Teresa Guilherme (2–6); Manuel Luís Goucha (7); Cristina Ferreira (8–)
Portugal	Secret Story: Desafio Final; Secret Story: Final Challenge	TVI; TVI Reality (live; 6–); TVI Direct (live; 1–5)	Season 1, 2013: Cátia Palhinha; Season 2, 2014: Érica Silva; Season 3, 2015: Sofia Sousa; Season 4, 2017: Carlos Sousa; Season 5, 2025: Inês Morais; Season 6, 2026: Pedro Jorge	Current; Cristina Ferreira (6–); Former; Teresa Guilherme (1–4); Cláudio Ramos (5)
Portugal	Secret Story: Luta Pelo Poder; Secret Story: Power Struggle	TVI; TVI Reality (live; 6–); TVI Direct (live; 1–5)	Season 1, 2015: Bruno Sousa	Teresa Guilherme
Portugal	Secret Story: O Reencontro; Secret Story: The Reunion	TVI; TVI Reality (live; 6–); TVI Direct (live; 1–5)	Season 1, 2018: Carina Ferreira	Manuel Luís Goucha
Romania	Big Brother România Big Brother Romania	Prima TV	Season 1, 2003: Sorin Pavel Fisteag; Season 2, 2004: Iustin Popovici	Andreea Raicu; Virgil Ianțu
Russia	Большой Брат; Bolshoy Brat; Big Brother	TNT	Season 1, 2005: Anastasia Yagaylova	Ingeborga Dapkunaite
Scandinavia (Norway and Sweden)	Big Brother	Kanal 5 FEM	Season 1, 2005: Britt Goodwin; Season 2, 2006: Jessica Lindgren	Brita Møystad Engseth (1–2); Adam Alsing (1); Hannah Rosander (2)
Scandinavia (Norway and Sweden)	Big Brother	Kanal 9 FEM	Season 3, 2014: Anders Olsson	Pia Lykke; Adam Alsing
Second Life	Big Brother Second Life	World Wide Web	Season 1, 2006: Madlen Flint	None
Slovakia	Big Brother: Súboj (1); Big Brother: Duel	Markíza	Season 1, 2005: Richard Tkáč	Viliam Rozboril (1); Zuzana Belohorcová (1)
Slovakia	Big Brother Česko & Slovensko (Czech Republic and Slovakia)	Markíza; Voyo	Season 1, 2023–24: Stanislav Liška	Míra Hejda
Slovenia	Big Brother	Kanal A	Season 1, 2007: Andrej Novak; Season 2, 2008: Naske Mehić; Season 3, 2015: Pia Filipčič; Season 4, 2016: Mirela Lapanović	Main hosts: Nina Osenar (1–2); Ana Maria Mitič (3); Manja Plešnar (4); Co-hosts: Matej Grm-Gušti (2); Emi Nikočević (4); Tibor Baiee (4)
Slovenia	Big Brother Slavnih; Big Brother Famous	Pop TV	Season 1, 2010: Jože Činč	Nina Osenar
South Africa	Big Brother South Africa	M-Net; Mzansi Magic; Mzansi Wethu; DStv/GOtv (live)	Season 1, 2001: Ferdinand Rabie; Season 2, 2002: Richard Cawood	Mark Pilgrim; Gerry Rantseli
South Africa	Big Brother Mzansi	M-Net; Mzansi Magic; Mzansi Wethu; DStv/GOtv (live)		
South Africa	Big Brother Mzansi	M-Net; Mzansi Magic; Mzansi Wethu; DStv/GOtv (live)	Season 1, 2014: Mandla Hlatshwayo; Season 2, 2015: Nkanyiso "Ace" Khumalo & Ntombi Tshabalala; Season 3, 2022: Michelle "Mphowabadimo" Mvundla; Season 4, 2024: Siphephelo "McJunior" Zondi; Season 5, 2025: Akhonamathemba "Sweet Guluva" Mbele; Season 6, 2026: Liema Pantsi	Lungile Radu (1–2); Lawrence Maleka (3–4); Smash Afrika (5–)
South Africa	Celebrity Big Brother	M-Net; Mzansi Magic; Mzansi Wethu; DStv/GOtv (live)	Season 1, 2002: Bill Flynn	Mark Pilgrim; Gerry Rantseli
South Africa	Big Brother Titans (Nigeria and South Africa)	M-Net; Mzansi Magic; Mzansi Wethu; DStv/GOtv (live)	Season 1, 2023: Khosi Twala	Lawrence Maleka; Ebuka Obi-Uchendu
Spain	Gran Hermano	Telecinco (Main show and Debate); Mediaset Infinity; Telecinco Estrellas (9); Telecinco 2 (10); LaSiete (11–14); Nueve (14); Divinity (15–18); Be Mad (live; 18); Quiero TV (live; 1–3); Vía Digital (live; 4–5); Digital+ (live; 6–11); GH 24H (live; 12); Mitele (live; 13–19)	Season 1, 2000: Ismael Beiro; Season 2, 2001: Sabrina Mahí; Season 3, 2002: Javito García; Season 4, 2002–03: Pedro Oliva; Season 5, 2003–04: Nuria Yáñez; Season 6, 2004: Juanjo Mateo; Season 7, 2005–06: Pepe Herrero; Season 8, 2006: Naiala Melo; Season 9, 2007: Judit Iglesias; Season 10, 2008–09: Iván Madrazo; Season 11, 2009–10: Ángel Muñoz; Season 12, 2010–11: Laura Campos; Season 13, 2012: Pepe Flores; Season 14, 2013: Susana Molina; Season 15, 2014: Paula González; Season 16, 2015: Sofía Suescun; Season 17, 2016: Beatriz Retamal; Season 18, 2017: Hugo Sierra; Season 19, 2024: Juan Luis Quintana; Season 20, 2025: Rocío Gallardo	Main host: Mercedes Milá (1–2, 4–16); Pepe Navarro (3); Jorge Javier Vázquez (17–); Debate: Jesús Vázquez (4–5); Carolina Ferre (6); Jordi González (7–9, 11–13, 15–18); Jorge Javier Vázquez (10); Frank Blanco (14); Ion Aramendi (19–)
Spain	Uno de GH20 (Digital edition)	Mediaset Infinity	Season 1, 2025: Joon Choi	Nagore Robles
Spain	Gran Hermano VIP	Telecinco (Main show and Debate); Mediaset Infinity; Cuatro (7); Divinity (3–6); Be Mad (live; 6); Mitele (live; 3–8)	Season 1, 2004: Marlène Mourreau; Season 2, 2005: Ivonne Armant; Season 3, 2015: Belén Esteban; Season 4, 2016: Laura Matamoros; Season 5, 2017: Alyson Eckmann; Season 6, 2018: Miriam Saavedra; Season 7, 2019: Adara Molinero; Season 8, 2023: Naomi Asensi; Season 9, 2026: Upcoming season	Main host: Jesús Vázquez (1–2); Jordi González (3–5; 7); Jorge Javier Vázquez (6–7; 9–); Marta Flich (8); Debate: Carolina Ferre (1); Jordi González (2–3; 7); Sandra Barneda (4–6); Ion Aramendi (8–)
Spain	Gran Hermano 12+1: La Re-vuelta; Gran Hermano 12+1: The Revolt	Telecinco (Main show and Debate); LaSiete; Mitele (live)	Season 1, 2012: Alessandro Livi	Main host: Mercedes Milá; Debate: Jordi González
Spain	Gran Hermano Dúo	Telecinco (Main show and Debate); Mediaset Infinity; Divinity; Be Mad (live); Mitele (live); CincoMAS (Americas)	Season 1, 2019: María Jesús Ruiz; Season 2, 2024: Lucía Sánchez; Season 3, 2025: Marieta Sola; Season 4, 2026: Carlos Lozano	Main host: Jorge Javier Vázquez (1; 4); Jordi González (1); Marta Flich (2); Carlos Sobera (3); Debate: Jordi González (1); Ion Aramendi (2–)
Spain	Gran Hermano: El Reencuentro (1); El Reencuentro (2); The Reunion	Telecinco (Main show and Debate); LaSiete; Digital+ (live; 1)	Season 1, 2010: Pepe Herrero & Raquel López; Season 2, 2011: Juan Miguel Martínez & Yola Berrocal	Main host: Mercedes Milá (1); Jordi González (2); Debate: Jordi González (1); Christian Gálvez (2)
Spain	El Tiempo del Descuento	Telecinco; CincoMAS (Americas)	Season 1, 2020: Gianmarco Onestini	Main host: Jorge Javier Vázquez; Debate: Nuria Marín Font
Spain	Secret Story	Telecinco	Season 1, 2021: Luca Onestini; Season 2, 2022: Rafa Martinez	Main host: Jorge Javier Vázquez (1); Carlos Sobera (2); Countdown: Carlos Sobera (1); Sandra Barneda (2); Debate: Jordi González (1); Toñi Moreno (2)
Sweden	Big Brother Sverige	Kanal 5	Season 1, 2000: Angelica Freij; Season 2, 2002: Ulrica Andersson; Season 3, 2003: Danne Sörensen; Season 4, 2004: Carolina Gynning	Adam Alsing
Sweden	Big Brother Sverige	TV11	Season 5, 2011: Simon Danielsson; Season 6, 2012: Hanna Johansson	Gry Forssell
Sweden	Big Brother Sverige	Kanal 11	Season 7, 2015: Christian Sahlström	Adam Alsing
Sweden	Big Brother Sverige	Sjuan; TV4 Play (stream); C More (live); TV4 (8; Premiere)	Season 8, 2020: Sami Jakobsson; Season 9, 2021: Tanja Helen Ingebretsen Kallin	Malin Stenbäck (8–); Arantxa Álvarez (9); Adrian Boberg (8; Premiere)
Sweden	Big Brother Stjärnveckan; Big Brother Week of the Stars	Kanal 5	Season 1, 2002: Anki Lundberg	Adam Alsing
Switzerland	Big Brother Schweiz; Big Brother Switzerland	TV3	Season 1, 2000: Daniela Hahn; Season 2, 2001: Christian Ponleitner	Daniel Fohrler (1); Eva Wannemacher (2)
Thailand	Big Brother Thailand	iTV (1–2)	Season 1, 2005: Nipon Perktim; Season 2, 2006: Arisa Sonthirod	Saranyu Vonkarjun (1–2); Nana Raibeena (2)
Turkey	Big Brother Türkiye	Star TV	Season 1, 2015–16: Sinan Aydemir	Asuman Krause
Ukraine	Big Brother Україна; Big Brother Ukraine	K1	Season 1, 2011: Kristina Kotvickaja	Olha Horbachova; Oleksiy Kurban
United Kingdom	Big Brother	Channel 4 S4C (1–10); TVN Lingua (2–4)	Series 1, 2000: Craig Phillips; Series 2, 2001: Brian Dowling; Series 3, 2002: Kate Lawler; Series 4, 2003: Cameron Stout; Series 5, 2004: Nadia Almada; Series 6, 2005: Anthony Hutton; Series 7, 2006: Pete Bennett; Series 8, 2007: Brian Belo; Series 9, 2008: Rachel Rice; Series 10, 2009: Sophie Reade; Series 11, 2010: Josie Gibson	Davina McCall MBE
United Kingdom	Big Brother	Channel 5 MTV (16–19); TV3 (16–18); Virgin Media One (19)	Series 12, 2011: Aaron Allard-Morgan; Series 13, 2012: Luke Anderson; Series 14, 2013: Sam Evans; Series 15, 2014: Helen Wood; Series 16, 2015: Chloe Wilburn; Series 17, 2016: Jason Burrill; Series 18, 2017: Isabelle Warburton; Series 19, 2018: Cameron Cole	Brian Dowling (12–13); Emma Willis (14–19)
United Kingdom	Big Brother	ITV2; ITV (20, select live episodes); ITVX (stream, live feed) (20-22); Virgin Media One (20-21)	Series 20, 2023: Jordan Sangha; Series 21, 2024: Ali Bromley; Series 22, 2025: Richard Storry; Series 23, 2026: Rochelle Rackham; Series 24, 2027: Upcoming series'	Will Best; AJ Odudu
United Kingdom	Celebrity Big Brother	Channel 4 BBC One (1); S4C (2–7)	Series 1, 2001: Jack Dee; Series 2, 2002: Mark Owen; Series 3, 2005: Bez; Series 4, 2006: Chantelle Houghton; Series 5, 2007: Shilpa Shetty; Series 6, 2009: Ulrika Jonsson; Series 7, 2010: Alex Reid	Davina McCall MBE
United Kingdom	Celebrity Big Brother	Channel 5 MTV (15–22); TV3 (16–18); 3e (19–22); Virgin Media Two (22)	Series 8, 2011: Paddy Doherty; Series 9, Winter 2012: Denise Welch; Series 10, Summer 2012: Julian Clary; Series 11, Winter 2013: Rylan Clark; Series 12, Summer 2013: Charlotte Crosby; Series 13, Winter 2014: Jim Davidson; Series 14, Summer 2014: Gary Busey; Series 15, Winter 2015: Katie Price; Series 16, Summer 2015: James Hill; Series 17, Winter 2016: Scott 'Scotty T' Timlin; Series 18, Summer 2016: Stephen Bear; Series 19, Winter 2017: Coleen Nolan; Series 20, Summer 2017: Sarah Harding; Series 21, Winter 2018: Shane Jenek / Courtney Act; Series 22, Summer 2018: Ryan Thomas	Brian Dowling (8–11); Emma Willis (12–22)
United Kingdom	Celebrity Big Brother	ITV; ITVX (stream, live feed); Virgin Media Two; Virgin Media Player	Series 23, 2024: David Potts; Series 24, 2025: Jack P. Shepherd	Will Best; AJ Odudu
United Kingdom	Teen Big Brother	Channel 4/E4; S4C	Series 1, 2003: Paul Brennan	Dermot O'Leary
United Kingdom	Big Brother Panto	Channel 4/E4; S4C	Series 1, 2004–05: No winner	Jeff Brazier; June Sarpong
United Kingdom	Big Brother: Celebrity Hijack	Channel 4/E4; S4C	Series 1, 2008: John Loughton	Dermot O'Leary
United Kingdom	Ultimate Big Brother	Channel 4/E4; S4C	Series 1, 2010: Brian Dowling	Davina McCall
United States (English)	Big Brother (Broadcast edition)	CBS; Showtime 2 (8–14); Pop (15–21); CBS.com/AOL (Live; 1); CBS All Access (Live; 15–22); Paramount+ (Live; 23–); Pluto TV (Live; 25–)	Season 1, 2000: Eddie McGee; Season 2, 2001: Will Kirby; Season 3, 2002: Lisa Donahue; Season 4, 2003: Jun Song; Season 5, 2004: Drew Daniel; Season 6, 2005: Maggie Ausburn; Season 8, 2007: Dick Donato; Season 9, Winter 2008: Adam Jasinski; Season 10, Summer 2008: Dan Gheesling; Season 11, 2009: Jordan Lloyd; Season 12, 2010: Hayden Moss; Season 13, 2011: Rachel Reilly; Season 14, 2012: Ian Terry; Season 15, 2013: Andy Herren; Season 16, 2014: Derrick Levasseur; Season 17, 2015: Steve Moses; Season 18, 2016: Nicole Franzel; Season 19, 2017: Josh Martinez; Season 20, 2018: Kaycee Clark; Season 21, 2019: Jackson Michie; Season 23, 2021: Xavier Prather; Season 24, 2022: Taylor Hale; Season 25, 2023: Jag Bains; Season 26, 2024: Chelsie Baham; Season 27, 2025: Ashley Hollis; Season 28, 2026: Rick Devens; Season 29, 2027: Upcoming season; Season 30, 2028: Upcoming season	Current; Julie Chen Moonves; Former; Ian O'Malley (1); Guest; Jerry O'Connell (26)
United States (English)	Big Brother: All-Stars	CBS; Showtime 2 (8–14); Pop (15–21); CBS.com/AOL (Live; 1); CBS All Access (Live; 15–22); Paramount+ (Live; 23–); Pluto TV (Live; 25–)	Season 7, 2006: Mike "Boogie" Malin; Season 22, 2020: Cody Calafiore	Current; Julie Chen Moonves; Former; Ian O'Malley (1); Guest; Jerry O'Connell (26)
United States (English)	Big Brother: Over the Top (Digital edition)	CBS All Access	Season 1, 2016: Morgan Willett	Julie Chen Moonves
United States (English)	Celebrity Big Brother	CBS; Pop; CBS All Access (Live; 1–2); Paramount+ (Live; 3–)	Season 1, 2018: Marissa Jaret Winokur; Season 2, 2019: Tamar Braxton; Season 3, 2022: Miesha Tate	Julie Chen Moonves
United States (English)	Big Brother Reindeer Games	CBS; Paramount+	Season 1, 2023: Nicole Franzel-Arroyo	Derek Xiao; Tiffany Mitchell; Jordan Lloyd
United States (Spanish)	Gran Hermano	Telemundo	Season 1, 2016: Pedro Orta	Giselle Blondet
United States (Spanish)	La casa de los famosos The House of the Famous	Telemundo	Season 1, 2021: Alicia Machado; Season 2, 2022: Ivonne Montero; Season 3, 2023: Madison Anderson; Season 4, 2024: Maripily Rivera; Season 6, 2026: Fabio Agostini; Season 7, 2027: Upcoming season	Current; Jimena Gallego; Javier Poza (5–); Former; Héctor Sandarti (1–3); Nacho Lozano (4)
United States (Spanish)	La casa de los famosos: All-Stars; The House of the Famous: All-Stars	Telemundo	Season 5, 2025: Carlos "Caramelo" Cruz	Current; Jimena Gallego; Javier Poza (5–); Former; Héctor Sandarti (1–3); Nacho Lozano (4)
Uruguay	Gran Hermano Uruguay	Canal 10; AntelTV (live)	Season 1, 2026: Current season	Eduardo Gianarelli
Vietnam	Người Giấu Mặt; The person who hides his face Big Brother Vietnam	VTV6	Season 1, 2013–14: Hoàng Sơn Việt	Huy Khánh

== Current series ==
Season currently being aired.

Country	Latest Series	Launch date	Finale date	Network	Days	Contestants	Host(s)	Winner	Grand prize
Africa	Secret Story (season 3)	17 October 2026	present	Canal+ Afrique	TBA	20	Jean-Michel Onnin; Mayana Vlehi	TBA	FCFA 20,000,000
Albania	Big Brother VIP (season 5)	20 December 2025	18 April 2026	Top Channel	120	39	Ledion Liço	Selin Bollati	€100,000
Argentina	Gran Hermano (season 13)	23 February 2026	16 September 2026	Telefe	206	43	Santiago del Moro	Solange Gómez	AR$ 70 million pesos
Australia	Big Brother (season 17)	26 October 2026	TBA	Network 10	30	14	Mel Tracina	TBA	A$135,000
Brazil	Big Brother Brasil 26	12 January 2026	21 April 2026	TV Globo	100	25	Tadeu Schmidt	Ana Paula Renault	R$ 5.7 million
Bulgaria	Big Brother Bulgaria 7	21 September 2025	15 November 2025	Nova Television	55	16	Bashar Rahal; Aleksandra Bogdanska	David Bett	BGN100,000
Canada (English)	Big Brother Canada 12	5 March 2024	8 May 2024	Global	69	14	Arisa Cox	Bayleigh Pelham	$200,000
Canada (French)	Big Brother Célébrités (season 6)	11 January 2026	29 March 2026	Noovo	85	16	Marie-Mai Bouchard	Gabrielle Côté	$100,000
Colombia	La casa de los famosos (season 3)	12 January 2026	29 May 2026	Canal RCN	138	28	Carla Giraldo; Marcelo Cezán	Alejandro Estrada	$500,000,000
France	Secret Story (season 14)	23 June 2026	20 August 2026	TFX	60	14	Christophe Beaugrand	Paola Cavalli	€105,000
Germany	Promi Big Brother 14	5 October 2026	19 October 2026	Sat.1	15	14	Jochen Schropp; Marlene Lufen	Maurice Dziwak	€50,000
Greece	Big Brother (season 8)	27 April 2025	27 July 2025	Skai TV	80	19	Petros Lagoutis	Christos Dedopoulos	€100,000
Hungary	Való Világ season 12	5 May 2024	28 July 2024	RTL+	85	15	Peti Puskás; Csilla Megyeri	Farkas Ádám	37,650,000HUF
India (Hindi)	Bigg Boss 20	6 September 2026	TBA	Colors TV	106	TBA	Salman Khan	TBA	₹50 lakh
India (Kannada)	Bigg Boss 13	6 September 2026	TBA	Colors Kannada	112	TBA	Sudeepa	TBA	₹50 lakh
India (Malayalam)	Bigg Boss 8	6 September 2026	TBA	Asianet	105	TBA	Mohanlal	TBA	₹50 lakh
India (Tamil)	Bigg Boss 10	6 September 2026	TBA	Star Vijay	105	TBA	Vijay Sethupathi	TBA	₹50 lakh
India (Telugu)	Bigg Boss 10	6 September 2026	TBA	Star Maa	105	TBA	Nagarjuna	TBA	TBA
India (Bengali)	Bigg Boss 3	29 August 2026	TBA	Star Jalsha	105		Sourav Ganguly	TBA	TBA
India (Marathi)	Bigg Boss 6	11 January 2026	19 April 2026	Colors Marathi	98	21	Riteish Deshmukh	Tanvi Kolte	₹15 lakh (US$16,000)
Israel	האח הגדול 15	10 March 2026	27 June 2026	Channel 13	110	20	Liron Weizman; Guy Zu-Aretz	Gal Rubin	₪1,000,000
Italy	Grande Fratello (season 19)	29 September 2025	18 December 2025	Canale 5	81	18	Alfonso Signorini	Anita Mazzotta	€100,000
Kosovo	Big Brother VIP Kosova (season 5)	30 October 2026	2027	Klan Kosova	TBA	21	Alaudin Hamiti; Jonida Vokshi	TBA	€100,000
Malta	Big Brother Malta (season 1)	19 January 2025	13 April 2025	TVM	85	15	Ryan Borg; Josmar Gatt	Jay Vella	€40,300
Mexico	La casa de los famosos (season 4)	26 July 2026	4 October 2026	Las Estrellas	71	15	Galilea Montijo; Diego de Erice; Odalys Ramírez	Mariana Ochoa	$4,000,000
Nigeria	Big Brother Naija season 11	26 July 2026	4 October 2026	Africa Magic	70	24	Ebuka Obi-Uchendu	Temi Nkem	₦150 million
Pakistan	Tamasha (season 5)	8 August 2026	10 October 2026	ARY Digital	66	18	Adnan Siddiqui	Babrik Shah	Rs 47
Philippines	Pinoy Big Brother: Collab 3.0	24 October 2026	present	GMA Network	TBD	16	See list: Bianca Gonzalez; Gabbi Garcia; Robi Domingo; Melai Cantiveros; Enchong Dee; Alexa Ilacad; Michael Sager	TBD	TBD
Portugal	Big Brother: All Stars	6 September 2026	31 December 2026	TVI	117	26	Maria Botelho Moniz	TBD	€50,000
Spain	Gran Hermano (season 20)	6 November 2025	18 December 2025	Telecinco	TBD	20	Jorge Javier Vazquez	Rocio Gallardo	€300,000
United Kingdom	Big Brother 2026	13 September 2026	5 November 2025	ITV2	54	17	AJ Odudu; Will Best	Rochelle Rackham	£100,000
United States (English)	Big Brother 28	9 July 2026	1 October 2026	CBS	87	17	Julie Chen Moonves	Rick Devens	$750,000
United States (Spanish)	La casa de los famosos 6	17 February 2026	11 June 2026	Telemundo	115	26	Jimena Gallego; Javier Poza	Fabio Agostini	$200,000
Uruguay	Gran Hermano (season 1)	20 September 2026	present	Canal 10	90	21	Eduardo Gianarelli		

== Big Brother: The Game ==
On 5 May 2020, Endemol Shine Group announced that an official Big Brother mobile game named Big Brother: The Game was being developed by Irish gaming company 9th Impact, with a worldwide release expected later that year. The game uses the American format, with competitions determining the Head of Household and Power of Veto holders, with an eviction cycle occurring each day. Players must form alliances with one another to stay in the game and advance to the next tier. Other users may spectate other games, but outside interference is strictly forbidden. Players were able to win up to $1,000,000 in prizes.

A trial season took place in the Republic of Ireland during the summer of 2020. The player Aoife Cheung won a €5000 prize after surviving four evictions. The game was officially launched on 15 October 2020 worldwide for both iOS, Android devices and PC platforms.

The first season concluded on 29 July 2021 and was won by Amy Elizabeth, a 31-year-old special education teacher from Delaware who won a grand prize of $33,270.

On March 7, 2023, a third season of the game was announced to launch later that year on mobile and PC platforms, including Steam. The grand prize was stated to be for up to $1,000,000, with new features being added in response to fan feedback. However, no global third season took place, with a special British and Irish-only version launching to coincide with the show returning to ITV2 and ITVX, in an official partnership with the broadcaster. This version featured overhauled graphics, with Banijay announcing that previous games had reached 500K players.

== Controversies ==
=== Legal ===
In April 2000, Castaway, an independent production company, filed a lawsuit against John de Mol and Endemol for stealing the concepts of their own show called Survive!, a reality television show where contestants are placed on a deserted island and have to take care of themselves alone. These contestants were also filmed by cameras around them. The court later dismissed the lawsuit filed by Castaway against de Mol and Endemol. The Survive! reality television format was later turned into Survivor.

In 2000, the estate of George Orwell sued CBS Television and Endemol for copyright and trademark infringement, claiming that the program infringed on the Orwell novel 1984 and its trademarks. After a series of court rulings adverse to the defendants (CBS and Endemol), the case was settled for an undisclosed amount of money on the evening of the trial.

=== Sexual assault ===
There have been three documented occurrences of possible rape happening during the show. In Big Brother South Africa, a male housemate was accused of assaulting a fellow housemate while she was asleep. The pair were filmed kissing and cuddling in bed before the cameras moved away and the male housemate reportedly claimed to housemates the next day that he had intercourse with the contestant. However, the female housemate was apparently shocked by the claims and informed female housemates that she had not consented to have sex with him (under South African law, this act would be constituted as rape). This male housemate was expelled immediately after the allegations surfaced and was later arrested pending investigation, while the female housemate was removed from the house for her own protection and counselling. After this incident, the other housemates were warned not to attempt any further obscene actions, or they would be subject to a penalty of 43 years in prison and immediate expulsion from the house.

In Big Brother Brasil, many viewers reported that they watched a male housemate allegedly force himself on a female housemate while she was passed-out drunk after a "boozy party". Soon after, the Federal Police of Brazil entered the house and arrested the offending housemate, who was later banned from ever appearing on the show again.

Additionally, an incident of sexual assault occurred in the Australian Big Brother house in 2006, during the show's sixth season. Contestant Michael "John" Bric held down fellow contestant Camilla Severi in her bed while a second man, Michael "Ashley" Cox, "slapped" her in the face with his penis, an indecent act illegal under Australian law. The incident was shown on the 'Adults-only' late-night segment, Big Brother: Adults Only, leading to the show's cancellation. Both men involved in the incident were removed from the house.

== Bibliography ==
- Johnson-Woods, Toni (2002). Big Brother: Why Did That Reality TV Show Become Such a Phenomenon?. Australia: University of Queensland Press. ISBN 0-7022-3315-3.
