= Gran Hermano (Ecuadorian TV series) =

- Presented by: Toty Rodríguez (Host); Carlos Vera (Debates); Vanessa Passailaigue (Co-Host)
- Country of origin: Ecuador
- Original language: Spanish
- No. of seasons: 1

Production
- Production company: Endemol

Original release
- Network: Ecuavisa
- Release: 16 March – 13 July 2003

Related
- Big Brother

Gran Hermano was the Ecuadorian version of the reality show based on the international Big Brother format produced in the Netherlands by Endemol. Gran Hermano was broadcast by Ecuavisa network and 24 hours a day by its paid television company Univisa obtaining the highest ratings of the last years.

The reality show was filmed in the house of Argentine version, owned by the television Network Telefe and it began on 16 March 2003 and finished on 13 July 2003 with a total duration of 120 days.

The winner of the first season was David Burbano, a 21-year-old student born in the city of Cuenca.

== First season (2003) ==
=== Contestants ===
Name	Age	Hometown	Occupation	Result
David Burbano	21	Cuenca, Azuay	Student	Winner
Álvaro Montalván	23	Guayaquil, Guayas	Bachelor of Business Administration	Second Place
Pablo Úraga	24	Guayaquil, Guayas	Marketing Technical	Third Place
Katherine Escobar	18	Quito, Pichincha	Model	Fourth Place
María Rosa Mite	27	Guayaquil, Guayas	Merchant	Evicted
Jaime Andres Sempertegui	25	Guayaquil, Guayas	Systems Engineer Student	Evicted
Karina Romo	23	Guayaquil, Guayas	Model	Evicted
Monica Vela	28	Quito, Pichincha	Actress	Evicted
Lorena Zerpa	21	Quito, Pichincha	Foreign Trade Student	Walked
Vladimir Oña	28	Quito, Pichincha	Marketing Professional	Evicted
Marco Beltran	22	Guayaquil, Guayas	Human Resources Student	Evicted
Sofía Gomez	24	Guayaquil, Guayas	Craftswoman	Evicted
Wendy Sanchez	22	Manta, Manabi	Family Business	Evicted

=== Nominations table ===
Housemates nominate for two points (top of the box) and one point (bottom of the box) and the two or more Housemates with the most nomination points face the public vote.

	Week 1	Week 3	Week 5	Week 7	Week 9	Week 11	Week 13	Week 15	Week 17	
David	Wendy; Marco	? ?	? ?	Vladimir; Pablo	Maria Rosa; Pablo	Karina; Pablo	Jaime Andres; Pablo	Pablo; Maria Rosa	Winner (Day 120)	
Alvaro	Marco; Wendy	Jaime Andrés; Sofia	Marco; Pablo	Pablo; Vladimir	Jaime Andres; Pablo	Karina; Pablo	Pablo; Jaime Andres	Pablo; Katherine	Runner-Up (Day 120)	
Pablo	Wendy ?	? ?	David ?	David ?	Alvaro; David	Alvaro; Katherine	David; Alvaro	Alvaro; David	Third Place (Day 120)	
Katherine	Not in House					Karina; Maria Rosa	Jaime Andres; Maria Rosa	Maria Rosa; Pablo	Fourth Place (Day 116)	
Maria Rosa	Wendy; Marco	Marco; Sofia	Marco; Pablo	Vladimir; Pablo	Alvaro; David	Katherine; Karina	Katherine; David	Katherine; David	Evicted (Day 113)	
Jaime Andres	Wendy ?	? ?	David ?	? David	Alvaro; Monica	Katherine; Álvaro	Katherine; Alvaro	Evicted (Day 99)		
Karina	Wendy; Marco	Sofia; Marco	David; Marco	? ?	Monica; Álvaro	Katherine; David	Evicted (Day 85)			
Monica	? ?	Sofia ?	Marco; Pablo	Vladimir; Pablo	Alvaro; Karina	Evicted (Day 71)				
Lorena	Wendy ?	? ?	? ?	? ?	Walked (Day 60)					
Vladimir	Wendy ?	? ?	David ?	David; Monica	Evicted (Day 57)					
Marco	? ?	? ?	? ?	Evicted (Day 43)						
Sofia	? ?	? ?	Evicted (Day 29)							
Wendy	? ?	Evicted (Day 15)								
Notes	none				1, 2, 3	4	none		5, 6	
Nominated	Marco; Wendy	Marco; Sofia	David; Marco	David; Pablo; Vladimir	Alvaro; Monica	Karina; Katherine	Jaime Andres; Katherine	Maria Rosa; Pablo; Katherine	Alvaro; David; Katherine; Pablo	
Walked	none				Lorena	none				
Evicted	Wendy; 60% to evict	Sofia; 81% to evict	Marco; 78% to evict	Vladimir; 92% to evict	Monica; 87% to evict	Karina; 84% to evict	Jaime Andres; 60% to evict	Maria Rosa; 84% to evict	Katherine; 10.44% (out of 4) to win	Pablo; 13.4% (out of 3) to win
Evicted	Wendy; 60% to evict	Sofia; 81% to evict	Marco; 78% to evict	Vladimir; 92% to evict	Monica; 87% to evict	Karina; 84% to evict	Jaime Andres; 60% to evict	Maria Rosa; 84% to evict	Alvaro; 34.6% (out of 3) to win	David; 52.0% (out of 3) to win

=== Notes ===
- Note 1: In week 9, Lorena voluntarily leaves the house.
- Note 2: In week 9, an exchange was held between the Houses of Big Brother Ecuador and Big Brother Mexico. Alvaro was chosen to travel to Mexico and Eduardo, a mexican contestant, to live one week in the Ecuadorian edition.
- Note 3: In week 10 Katherine entered the house as Lorena's replacement.
- Note 4: In week 11 Katherine loses her Immunity for revealing outside information.She can nominate and be nominated.
- Note 5: The final was split into two rounds. The first finalist was eliminated with minor percentage of save votes on Day 116 and then the public continued voting for the winner between the remaining three Housemates.
- Note 6: The total telephone votes were 531,721. 276,307 votes were for David, 184,198 votes were for Alvaro and 71,216 votes were for Pablo.
