= Big Brother Second Life =

Television series

Big Brother Second Life (BBSL) was a virtual version of Big Brother, produced by Endemol in the virtual world of Second Life.

15 Second Life contestants from three time zones were chosen to participate. The contest to become a contestant began on December 1, 2006. Contestants had to spend at least eight hours a day in the transparent virtual Big Brother house for a total of one month, and completed various tasks such as building replicas of famous buildings. Their fate was decided by other Second Life residents, who voted on which contestants would be allowed to stay.

The Big Brother island, where residents applied to become contestants, contained five transparent residential units and a Big Brother nightclub. During the course of the competition, several BB competitors kept online diaries of their participation.

The contest ended on January 4, 2007, with the winner receiving their own virtual island. The winner was Madlen Flint.

== Housemates ==
The 15 virtual Big Brother participants were:

Name	Country	Gender	Status
Phaylen Fairchild	United States	Female	8th evicted
Lillani Lowell	Canada	Female	Runner-up
Golda Stein	United States	Female	3rd place
Gideon Television	Canada	Male	1st evicted
Kit Maitland	United States	Female	5th evicted
Allatu Augustus	United States	Female	4th place
Madlen Flint	Hungary	Female	Winner
Simon Walsh	United Kingdom	Male	7th evicted
TheDiva Rockin	United States	Female	6th evicted
Warda Kawabata	Japan	Female	3rd evicted
Lorita Laguna	Spain	Female	4th evicted
PrincessNina Prefect	Mexico	Female	9th evicted
Rencius Herber	Germany	Male	11th evicted
Pannie Paperdoll	United States	Female	10th evicted
Simone Spicer	Brazil	Female	2nd evicted
