= Big Brother (Slovak TV series) =

- Presented by: Viliam Rozboril; Zuzana Belohorcová
- No. of days: 92
- No. of housemates: 19
- Winner: Richard Tkáč
- Runner-up: Ján Bryndza

Release
- Original network: Markíza
- Original release: 18 September – 18 December 2005

Big Brother: Súboj (lit. Big Brother: Duel) is a Slovak version of the reality television franchise Big Brother. It aired for only one season from 18 September 2005 to 18 December 2005 on Markíza. In June 2023, Czech TV Nova, video on demand service Voyo and Markíza announced the preparation of a Czech-Slovak version of the program.

The Slovak version is based on the original Dutch Big Brother series produced by Endemol, where a number of contestants live in an isolated house for a certain period of time. At all times, housemates are under the control of Big Brother, a rule-enforcing authority figure who monitors the behavior of the housemates, sets tasks and punishments, and provides the only link to the outside world for the contestants. The premiere saw thirteen housemates originally enter the house, with four additional people entering at various points during the show.

== Housemates ==
Name	Age	Day entered	Day exited	Status
Richard Tkáč	26	5	92	Winner
Ján Bryndza	27	1	92	Runner-up
Sandra Sedláková	23	1	92	3rd place
Boris Prihradský	26	1	88	Evicted
Michaela Rajtarová	19	1	85	Evicted
Michal Držka	22	1	78	Evicted
Erika "Erotka" Okrajková	25	46	71	Evicted
Milan "Pinzo" Pinzik	42	1	64	Evicted
Peter "Hud'o" Húdek	23	1	57	Evicted
Denisa Mečiarová	20	1	50	Evicted
Tomáš "Koketa" Lednický	27	33	48	Ejected
Peter Petrovič	20	1	43	Evicted
Viktória Szalaiová	27	1	36	Evicted
Silvia Rumanová	21	1	35	Walked
Karolína Botková	22	1	29	Evicted
Dana Moravčíková	31	1	22	Evicted
Marian Grolmus	26	1	19	Walked
Miriam Madová	29	1	15	Evicted
Milan Ferčík	23	1	3	Walked

== Nominations Table ==
	Week 2	Week 3	Week 4	Week 5	Week 6	Week 7	Week 8	Week 9	Week 10	Week 11	Week 12	Week 13		
	Week 2	Week 3	Week 4	Week 5	Week 6	Week 7	Week 8	Week 9	Week 10	Week 11	Week 12	Day 88	Final	
Richard	Not In; House	Marian, Viktória	Boris, Silvia	Pinzo, Silvia	Michaela, Peter	Koketa	Hud'o	Ertoka	Not; Eligible	Not; Eligible	Not; Eligible	Boris, Ján	Winner (Day 92)	
Ján	Dana, Michal	Denisa, Hud'o	Denisa, Michal	Denisa, Michaela	Denisa, Ján	Denisa	Hud'o	Michal	Not; Eligible	Not; Eligible	Not; Eligible	Not; Eligible	Runner-up (Day 92)	
Sandra	Dana, Denisa	Dana, Denisa	Denisa, Hud'o	Hud'o, Peter	Hud'o, Michal	Denisa	Hud'o	Michal	Not; Eligible	Not; Eligible	Not; Eligible	Not; Eligible	Third place (Day 92)	
Boris	Michaela, Miriam	Richard, Viktória	Richard, Viktória	Richard, Viktória	Denisa, Ján	Michaela	Michaela	Ján	Not; Eligible	Not; Eligible	Michaela, Richard	Not; Eligible	Evicted (Day 88)	
Michaela	Boris, Marian	Dana, Denisa	Hud'o, Michal	Denisa, Ján	Denisa, Ján	Koketa	Michal	Richard	Not; Eligible	Boris, Michal	Not; Eligible	Evicted (Day 85)		
Michal	Dana, Denisa	Dana, Michalea	Denisa, Ján	Peter, Michaela	Koketa, Sandra	Ján	Michaela	Boris	Erotka, Michaela	Not; Eligible	Evicted (Day 78)			
Erotka	Not In; House						Exempt	Richard	Not; Eligible	Evicted (Day 71)				
Pinzo	Karolína, Miriam	Karolína, Silvia	Karolína, Viktória	Silvia, Viktória	Michaela, Peter	Sandra	Sandra	Erotka	Evicted (Day 64)					
Hud'o	Marian, Miriam	Dana, Michaela	Michaela, Peter	Denisa, Peter	Michaela, Peter	Michaela	Richard	Evicted (Day 57)						
Denisa	Peter, Silvia	Dana, Peter	Ján, Peter	Peter, Michaela	Denisa, Ján	Ján	Evicted (Day 50)							
Koketa	Not In; House			Exempt	Michaela, Peter	Boris	Ejected (Day 48)							
Peter	Dana, Michal	Dana, Denisa	Denisa, Michal	Hud'o, Sandra	Koketa, Sandra	Evicted (Day 43)								
Viktória	Michaela, Miriam	Boris, Silvia	Karolína, Silvia	Boris, Pinzo	Evicted (Day 36)									
Silvia	Dana, Denisa	Marian, Viktória	Karolína, Viktória	Pinzo, Viktória	Walked (Day 35)									
Karolína	Michaela, Miriam	Pinzo, Silvia	Pinzo, Silvia	Evicted (Day 29)										
Dana	Denisa, Michal	Denisa, Peter	Evicted (Day 22)											
Marian	Michaela, Miriam	Pinzo, Richard	Walked (Day 19)											
Miriam	Boris, Michaela	Evicted (Day 15)												
Milan	Walked (Day 3)													
Notes		none	none											
Nominated For Eviction	Denisa, Miriam	Dana, Silvia, Viktória	Denisa, Karolína, Silvia, Viktória	Denisa, Peter, Pinzo, Michaela, Viktória	Denisa, Ján, Michaela, Peter	Denisa, Ján, Koketa, Michaela	Hud'o, Michal, Richard, Sandra	Erotka, Michal, Pinzo, Richard	Erotka, Michaela	Boris, Michal	Michaela, Richard	Boris, Ján	Ján, Richard, Sandra	
Ejected	none					Koketa	none							
Walked	Milan	Marian	none	Silvia	none									
Evicted	Miriam; 44.6% to save	Dana; 6.5% to save	Karolína; 19.9% to save	Viktória; 15.0% to save	Peter; 23.4% to save	Denisa; 31.0% to save	Hud'o; 22.7% to save	Pinzo; 22.6% to save	Erotka; 34.0% to save	Michal; 47.8% to save	Michaela; 49.58% to save	Boris; 46.3% to save	Sandra; 24.0% to win (out of 3)	Ján; 45.3% to win
Evicted	Miriam; 44.6% to save	Dana; 6.5% to save	Karolína; 19.9% to save	Viktória; 15.0% to save	Peter; 23.4% to save	Denisa; 31.0% to save	Hud'o; 22.7% to save	Pinzo; 22.6% to save	Erotka; 34.0% to save	Michal; 47.8% to save	Michaela; 49.58% to save	Boris; 46.3% to save	Richard; 54.7% to win	

=== Notes ===
Voluntary Exits:
Milan had to leave the House after falling seriously ill within 24 hours of arrival.
Marian had to leave the House after breaking his leg.
Silvia requested to leave the House during her (televised) wedding day - and left the following day so she could be with her new husband.

- ^1 Housemates are split into two teams - the red team and the blue team. Each Week Housemates have to each Nominate two members (of their own team) and the one or more Housemate(s) from each team with the most Nominations faces the Public Vote to save. Teams were changed throughout the competition, but mostly stayed the same.
- ^2 The Public were allowed to choose Marian's replacement this Week. They voted, and Koketa won the vote with 58.1%; 52-year-old Vladimír Bizoň lost out on the vote. As Koketa was a new Housemate he was not eligible for Nominations this Week.
- ^3 This Week, as there were only 3 surviving members of the red team, Nominations were completely open and Housemates could Nominate from either team.
- ^4 The teams were re-shuffled this Week to even them out (they were previously unbalanced with 3 reds and 9 blues). Housemates this Week Nominated only one Housemate each to face the Public Vote. On Day 48 Koketa was Ejected from the House for aggressive and obscene behaviour, and although he had previously been Nominated, the Eviction would still take place between the three other Nominees. The Public Voted Erotka into the House as Silvia's replacement with 61.7% of the Vote - beating other hopeful Eva.
- ^5 Housemates Nominated a single Housemate from the other team this Week. As a new Housemates Erotka was Immune.
- ^6 Housemates Nominated a single Housemate from their OWN team. Pinzo was automatically Nominated for rule-breaking.
- ^7 The Housemate who received the most 'save' Votes, had to choose the two Housemates to face the Public Vote.
- ^8 For the final night all remaining Housemates faced the Public Vote.
