= Big Brother (Ukrainian TV series) =

- Presented by: Olha Horbachova; Oleksiy Kurban
- No. of days: 99
- No. of housemates: 22
- Winner: Kristina Kotvickaja
- Runner-up: Aleksandra Rud

Release
- Original release: 18 September – 25 December 2011

Big Brother Україна is a Ukrainian version of the Big Brother reality television show based on the Dutch television series of the same name originally created in 1997 by John de Mol Jr.'s company Endemol. The show is based on a group of strangers, known as Housemates, living together twenty-four hours a day in the "Big Brother" house, isolated from the outside world but under constant surveillance with no privacy for five months more.

The housemates compete by avoiding weekly eviction until the last housemates remain at the end of the season that can claim the grand prize. The show hosted by television personality Olha Horbachova and Oleksiy Kurban and broadcast on K1. The first and only season premiered on Monday 18 September 2011 and finished on Sunday 25 December 2011. The winner was Kristina Kotvickaja.

== Housemates ==
Housemates	Residence	Occupation	Age
Aleksandr Ogy	Kyiv	Musician	29
Aleksandra Rud	Kyiv	Student	23
Alena Voznyuk	Kyiv	Marketing Coordinator	21
Anatoly Haleta	Kyiv	Stylist	26
Andrey Dashevsky	Kyiv	Tattoo artist	29
Anton Leyba	Donetsk	Bike shop manager	21
Darja Krivonosova	Kyiv	Translator, Choreographer & Model	22
Eldar Eldano	Kyiv	Translator	27
Irina Alekseichik	Sevastopol	Teacher	27
Konstantin Stanislavskii	Kyiv	Presenter	20
Kristina Kotvickaja	Kyiv	Student	25
Marina Druzhbinskaja	Kryvyi Rih	Housewife	24
Natalija Kopievskaja	Kyiv	Assistant Director	30
Nazar Motsyak	Lviv	Choreographer	21
Spartak Sergienko	Konotop	Artist	28
Stanislav Jarocevich	Kyiv	Designer	23
Taras Motsyak	Lviv	Choreographer	21
Vladimir Shevchenko	Odesa	Industrial Designer	22
Vladislav Klimko	Uzhhorod	Businessman	38
Yuri Berus	Boyarka	Unemployed	35

== Nominations table ==
	Week 1	Week 2	Week 3	Week 4	Week 5	Week 6	Week 7	Week 8	Week 9	Week 10	Week 11	Week 12	Week 13	Week 14			Nominations received
	Week 1	Week 2	Week 3	Week 4	Week 5	Week 6	Week 7	Week 8	Week 9	Week 10	Week 11	Week 12	Week 13	Day 92	Final		Nominations received
Kristina	Housemate	Vladimir; Aleksandra	Vladimir; Aleksandra	~~Aleksandra~~; ~~Spartak~~	No; Nominations	Aleksandra; Natalija	Konstantin; Stanislav	Konstantin; Daria	Marina; Aleksandra	Anatoly; Andrey	No; Nominations	Daria; Aleksandra	Anton; Anatoly	No; Nominations	Winner (Day 99)		14
Aleksandra	Housemate	Kristina; Irina	Konstantin; Daria	~~Konstantin~~; ~~Daria~~	No; Nominations	Natalija; Anatoly	Stanislav; Anatoly	Eldar; Kristina	Eldar; Kristina	Aleksandr; Andrey	No; Nominations	Nazar; Kristina	Anton; Nazar	No; Nominations	Runner-Up (Day 99)		34
Anatoly	Not in house	Irina; Daria	Aleksandra; Konstantin	~~Aleksandra~~; ~~Vladimir~~	No; Nominations	Yuri; Konstantin	Konstantin; Aleksandra	Konstantin; Daria	Eldar; Kristina	Aleksandr; Andrey	No; Nominations	Nazar; Kristina	Anton; Nazar	No; Nominations	Third Place (Day 99)		17
Daria	Housemate	Vladimir; Aleksandra	Spartak; Aleksandra	~~Spartak~~; ~~Aleksandra~~	No; Nominations	Natalija; Anatoly	Stanislav; Anatoly	Eldar; Kristina	Eldar; Kristina	Aleksandr; Andrey	No; Nominations	Nazar; Kristina	Walked (Day 86)	No; Nominations	Ejected (Day 95)		20
Nazar	Not in house						Exempt		Eldar; Kristina	Anatoly; Anton	No; Nominations	Aleksandra; Anatoly	Anton; Anatoly	No; Nominations	Evicted (Day 94)		7
Anton	Not in house								Exempt	Aleksandr; Anatoly	No; Nominations	Nazar; Daria	Nazar; Anatoly	Evicted (Day 92)			5
Eldar	Not in house	Irina; Vladimir	Spartak; Aleksandra	~~Konstantin~~; ~~Aleksandra~~	No; Nominations	Natalija; Aleksandra	Konstantin; Anatoly	Konstantin; Daria	Marina; Anatoly	Walked (Day 67)	No; Nominations	Daria; Aleksandra	Evicted (Day 85)				8
Andrey	Not in house								Exempt	Aleksandr; Anatoly	No; Nominations	Evicted (Day 78)					5
Aleksandr	Not in house								Exempt	Anatoly; Andrey	Evicted (Day 71)						5
Marina	Non- Housemate	Irina; Vladimir	Aleksandra; Stanislav	~~Spartak~~; ~~Stanislav~~	No; Nominations	Aleksandra; Yuri	Konstantin; Aleksandra	Konstantin; Daria	Eldar; Kristina	Evicted (Day 64)							3
Taras	Not in house						Exempt		Walked (Day 58)								N/A
Yuri	Not in house					Marina; Aleksandra	Stanislav; Anatoly	Hospitalized (Day 47–57)	Walked (Day 57)								2
Konstantin	Housemate	Vladimir; Aleksandra	Spartak; Aleksandra	~~Spartak~~; ~~Aleksandra~~	No; Nominations	Stanislav; Anatoly	Stanislav; Anatoly	Eldar; Kristina	Evicted (Day 57)								26
Stanislav	Not in house	Alena; Irina	Alena; Konstantin	~~Konstantin~~; ~~Daria~~	No; Nominations	Konstantin; Daria	Konstantin; Daria	Evicted (Day 50)									9
Natalija	Not in house	Daria; Irina	Konstantin; Daria	~~Spartak~~; ~~Konstantin~~	No; Nominations	Aleksandra; Konstantin	Evicted (Day 43)										4
Spartak	Non- Housemate	Aleksandra; Daria	Daria; Konstantin	~~Konstantin~~; ~~Aleksandra~~	No; Nominations	Walked (Day 39)	Re-Entered; Nominated	Re-walked (Day 50)									8
Vladimir	Housemate	Irina; Aleksandra	Konstantin; Daria	~~Konstantin~~; ~~Aleksandra~~	No; Nominations	Evicted (Day 36)											7
Vladislav	Not in house	Aleksandra; Daria	Konstantin; Daria	~~Konstantin~~; ~~Aleksandra~~	Evicted (Day 29)												0
Alena	Housemate	Kristina; Aleksandra	Stanislav; Aleksandra	Evicted (Day 22)													2
Irina	Housemate	Aleksandra; Kristina	Evicted (Day 15)														7
Nikola	Non- Housemate	Evicted (Day 8)															N/A
Yulia	Non- Housemate	Evicted (Day 8)															N/A
Up for eviction	Nikola; Spartak	Aleksandra; Irina; Konstantin; Spartak	Aleksandra; Alena; Konstantin	Anatoly; Eldar; Kristina; Marina; Natalija; Vladislav	All housemates	Aleksandra; Eldar; Kristina; Natalija	Anatoly; Konstantin; Stanislav	Daria; Eldar; Konstantin; Kristina	Eldar; Kristina; Marina	Aleksandr; Anatoly; Andrey	All housemates	Aleksandra; Anton; Daria; Eldar; Kristina; Nazar	Aleksandra; Anatoly; Anton; Kristina; Nazar	Aleksandra; Anatoly; Daria; Kristina; Nazar	All housemates		
Up for eviction	Marina; Yulia	Aleksandra; Irina; Konstantin; Spartak	Aleksandra; Alena; Konstantin	Anatoly; Eldar; Kristina; Marina; Natalija; Vladislav	All housemates	Aleksandra; Eldar; Kristina; Natalija	Spartak	Daria; Eldar; Konstantin; Kristina	Eldar; Kristina; Marina	Aleksandr; Anatoly; Andrey	All housemates	Aleksandra; Anton; Daria; Eldar; Kristina; Nazar	Daria	Aleksandra; Anatoly; Daria; Kristina; Nazar	All housemates		
Walked	none					Spartak	Spartak	Yuri; Taras	none	Eldar	none		Daria	none			
Ejected	none														Daria		
Evicted	Nikola; 35.99% to enter	Irina; 9% to save/evict	Alena -30% to save/evict	Vladislav -3% to save/evict	Vladimir -16% to save/evict	Natalija -5% to save/evict	Stanislav -19% to save/evict	Konstantin; 4% to save/evict	Marina; 5% to save/evict	Aleksandr -18% to save/evict	Andrey; 2% to save/evict	Eldar -6% to save/evict	Anton; 8% to save/evict	Nazar; 5% to save/evict	Anatoly; 11% (out of 3)	Aleksandra; 31% (out of 2)	
Evicted	Yulia; 13.53% to enter	Irina; 9% to save/evict	Alena -30% to save/evict	Vladislav -3% to save/evict	Vladimir -16% to save/evict	Natalija -5% to save/evict	Spartak; 47% to re-enter	Konstantin; 4% to save/evict	Marina; 5% to save/evict	Aleksandr -18% to save/evict	Andrey; 2% to save/evict	Eldar -6% to save/evict	Daria; 83% to re-enter	Nazar; 5% to save/evict	Kristina; 55% to win		

== Audiences ==
Show	Date	Rating	Share
Launch	19 September	0.25%	0.77%
