= Gran Hermano (Colombian TV series) =

- Genre: Reality
- Created by: John de Mol Jr.
- Presented by: Adriana Arango (2003); Carlos Calero (2003); Agmeth Escaf (2012)
- Country of origin: Colombia
- Original language: Spanish
- No. of seasons: 2

Production
- Production company: Endemol

Original release
- Network: Caracol TV (2003); CityTV
- Release: 27 July 2003 – 18 November 2012

Gran Hermano Colombia is a reality television series produced by Endemol. It has had a total of 2 seasons. The first season aired in 2003 on Caracol TV.

Gran Hermano 2 (also be known as Gran Hermano 2012 por Citytv by the network) was the second season of Gran Hermano in Colombia. The season launched on Monday 20 August 2012. Nomination Day was set for Thursdays and Eviction was set for Tuesdays.

The series used different rules compare to its first season. Each week the housemates nominated two people for eviction with the two or more housemates receiving the most votes will face eviction and could be evicted.
