= Toty Rodríguez =

Ecuadorian actress

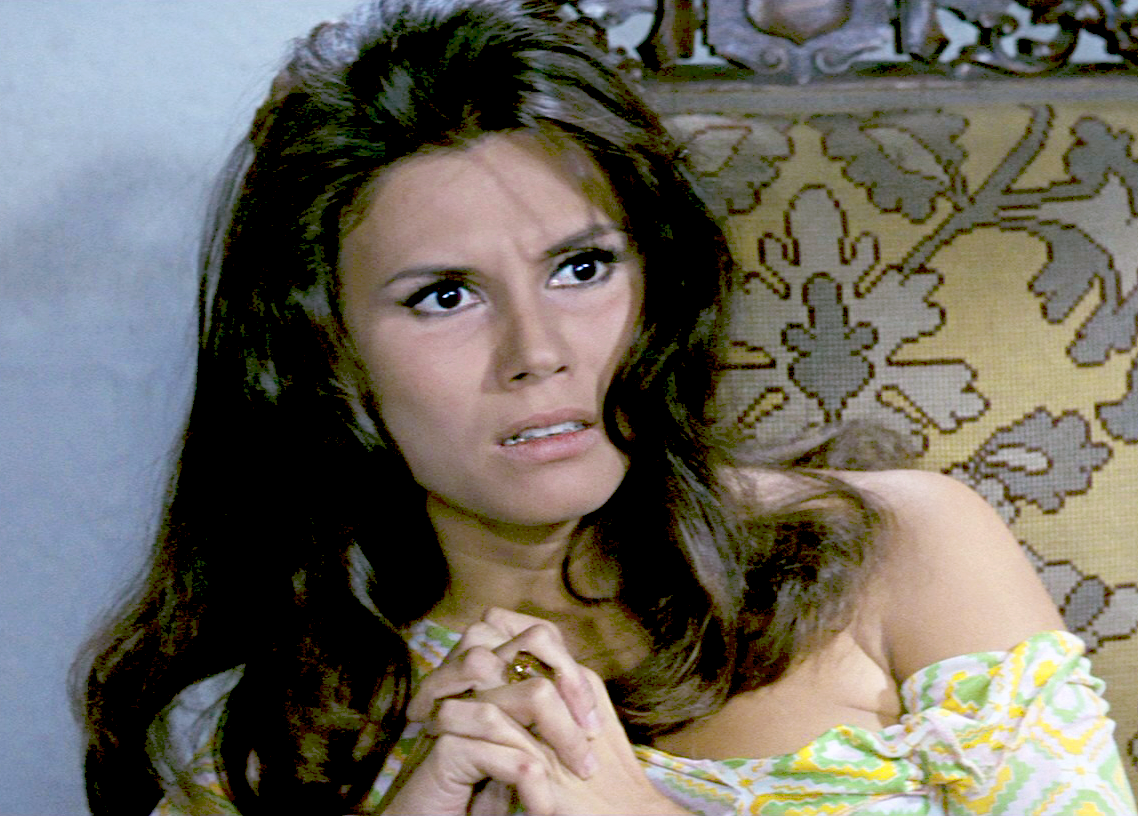
- Born: María Rosa Rodríguez Váscones; 7 November 1942 (age 83); Guayaquil
- Occupations: Actress, model, singer, presenter
- Beauty pageant titleholder
- Title: Miss World Ecuador 1960
- Major competitions: Miss World Ecuador 1960 (Winner); Miss World 1960 (Unplaced)

Toty Rodríguez (born María Rosa Rodríguez Váscones 7 November 1942) is an Ecuadorian actress, tv host, singer and beauty pageant titleholder who was crowned Miss World Ecuador 1960 and represented her country at Miss World 1960 but unplaced.

== Biography ==
Toty Rodríguez was born María Rosa Rodríguez Váscones in Guayaquil, Ecuador on 7 November 1942. She found an early interest in classical music, and chose to study singing, the piano, and the cello while still in high school. At 17, while going to college, Rodríguez performed in the play Madre y Hija at the request of another actress in 1959.

In 1960, Rodríguez became Miss World Ecuador in 1960 and came to compete in that year's Miss World contest. She toured London and other European cities, but would spend the most time in Paris because of modeling and advertising contracts. While in Paris, Rodríguez also took acting classes with Alain Delon and René Simon, was offered and rejected a part in a movie with her favorite actor Gregory Peck, and performed in several plays, most notably El gran restaurante.
