= Big Brother Africa season 9 =

Big Brother Africa
- Season 9
- No. of days: 63
- No. of housemates: 26
- Winner: Idris
- Runner-up: Tayo

Season chronology
- ← Previous; Season 8

Big Brother Africa 9 (also known as Big Brother Africa: Hotshots) was the ninth and final season of the Big Brother Africa reality television series produced by Endemol for M-Net. Production of Season 9 had to be put on hold as the Big Brother house in Highlands North, Johannesburg burnt down. No one was injured in the blaze, which currently has an unknown cause. Producers found and revamped a house for the season nearby in "7th Street" and launched a shorter season of only 63 days on October 5, 2014. Ikponmwosa "IK" Osakioduwa came back to host the show for the sixth time in a row.

== Format ==
There were twenty-six housemates this season and were living in the same house. The housemates were competing for US$300,000. This year, thirteen countries participated in the season. Each country had two representatives for them. Twelve of these countries were returning countries while the thirteenth country was new to the Big Brother Africa game. The twelve returning countries were Botswana, Ghana, Kenya, Malawi, Mozambique, Namibia, Nigeria, South Africa, Tanzania, Uganda, Zambia and Zimbabwe while the new country was Rwanda.

== Housemates ==
On Day 1, twenty six Housemates entered the House on launch night. Amongst them included two Housemates from Big Brother 8: The Chase's fake Emerald House. These two Housemates were Alusa (Kenya) and JJ (Zimbabwe).

Name	Real/Full Name	Age	Occupation	Country	Day entered	Day exited	Status
Idris	Idris Sultan	21	Photographer	Tanzania	1	63	Winner
Tayo	Akintayo John Faniran	28	Model	Nigeria	1	63	Runner-up
Macky 2	Mulaza Kaira	29	Musician	Zambia	1	63	3rd Place
Nhlanhla	Nhlanhla Nhlapo	24	Business Analyst, Actor and Model	South Africa	1	63	4th Place
JJ	Jerome Arab	23	Singer, actor, director, rapper and Songwriter	Zimbabwe	1	63	5th Place
Sipe	Sipherile Chitambo	24	Management Student and Hairdresser	Malawi	1	63	6th Place
M'am Bea	Beatrice Buabeng Oppong	25	Fashion Designer	Ghana	1	63	7th Place
Butterphly	Tariro Mharapara	24	Radio and Television Presenter and producer	Zimbabwe	1	63	8th Place
Ellah	Stellah Nantumbwe	23	Sales Assistant	Uganda	1	56	18th Evicted
Goitse	Goitseone Kgaswane	22	Student	Botswana	1	56	17th Evicted
Sheilla	Tshegofatso Sheilla Molelekwa	21	Student	Botswana	1	56	16th Evicted
Trezagah	Euler Elias	31	Singer	Mozambique	1	56	15th Evicted
Samantha	Samantha Jansen	29	Self-Employed	South Africa	1	42	14th Evicted
Mr. 265	Masuzgo Mark Msiska	23	Television Presenter	Malawi	1	42	13th Evicted
Permithias	Elioth Owosebo	25	Professional Chef	Namibia	1	35	12th Evicted
Frankie	Frank Rukundo	33	Singer, Model and actor	Rwanda	1	35	11th Evicted
Luis	Luis Tshita Munana	23	Associate Producer	Namibia	1	28	10th Evicted
Kacey Moore	Desmond Amidoo-Amoah	29	Poet and Songwriter	Ghana	1	28	9th Evicted
Arthur	Arthur Nkusi	23	Radio Presenter	Rwanda	1	28	8th Evicted
Alusa	Melvin Alusa	33	Actor, Radio Drama Director and MC	Kenya	1	21	7th Evicted
Laveda	Irene Neema Mwesiga	23	Graduate	Tanzania	1	21	6th Evicted
Sabina	Sabina Stadler	28	Television Personality and Student	Kenya	1	14	5th Evicted
Esther	Esther Namuddu	23	Student	Uganda	1	14	4th Evicted
Lilian	Aimiehi Onyinyen Afegbai	22	Model, Actor, Presenter and Tax Collector	Nigeria	1	14	3rd Evicted
Mira	Zulmira Miguel Andre Ngobo	21	Student	Mozambique	1	7	2nd Evicted
Resa	Theresa Liteta	25	Event planner, MC and Public Speaker	Zambia	1	7	1st Evicted

== Extravaganza ==
This season, a new task, called The Extravaganza, was added. This occurred every Saturday night. The housemates were split into two teams that were chosen by the Head of House for the week. The teams were each given a specific theme that they had to perform to impress Africa as they will vote for the best performed team. The winning team won immunity for the week while the losing team had to face the nomination dagger.

=== Week 1 ===
This week, the Extravaganza theme was called The Musical. This means that the housemates must perform a musical related skit. Head of House, Laveda chose the following two teams:

Team 1 was called The Green Peppers. The members of the team were Alusa, Arthur, Esther, Frankie, Goitse, JJ, Kacey Moore, Laveda, Lilian, Permithias, Sabina, Samantha and Tayo. They performed a story about a king and his son. After that, they made room for their musical performances of various styles. Team 2 was called Team Waka Waka Mou. The members of the team were Butterphly, Ellah, Idris, Luis, M'am Bea, Macky 2, Mira, Mr. 265, Nhlanhla, Resa, Sheilla, Sipe, and Trezagah. They performed a musical war cry with matching outfits to illustrate their act. They also made other musical contents during their performance.

Team Waka Waka Mou was the winning team and gained immunity from nominations, meaning that The Green Peppers were going to face the nomination dagger.

=== Week 2 ===
This week, the Extravaganza theme was called Bollywood. This means that the housemates had to show all their talents like singing, dancing, acting, etc. Head of House, Samantha chose the following two teams:

Team 1 was called The Silver Team. The members of the team were Alusa, Ellah, Esther, Idris, JJ, Kacey Moore, Laveda, Lilian, M'am Bea, Nhlanhla, Pemithias and Samantha. They had to perform a modern-day performance. Team 2 was called The Gold Team. The members of the team were Arthur, Butterphly, Frankie, Goitse, Luis, Macky 2, Mr. 265, Sabina, Sheilla, Sipe, Tayo and Trezagah.They had to perform a traditional performance.

The Gold Team was the winning team and gained immunity from nominations, meaning that The Silver Team were going to face the nomination dagger.

=== Week 3 ===
This week, the Extravaganza theme was called Pantomime. This means that the housemates had to perform a comedic-related skit in a childlike setting. Head of House, Nhlanhla chose the following two teams:

Team 1 was given the theme Candy Land. The members of the team were Alusa, Arthur, Kacey Moore, Laveda, Luis, Macky 2, Mr. 265, Nhlanhla, Permithias, Samantha and Sheilla. They had to perform a fairy tale that included lots of candy and fantasies. Team 2 was given the theme Forest Fantasy. The members of the team were Butterphly, Ellah, Frankie, Goitse, Idris, JJ, M'am Bea, Sipe, Tayo and Trezagah. They had to perform a forest/jungle related tale with many animal and forest props.

Forest Fantasy was the winning team and gained immunity from nominations, meaning that Candy Land were going to face the nomination dagger.

=== Week 4 ===
This week, the Extravaganza theme was called Shadow Dance/Stomp, meaning the housemates had to perform a story using dance routines. Head of House, JJ chose the following two teams:

Team 1 was called Downtown Beats. The members of the team were Butterphly, Idris, JJ, Kacey Moore, Luis, Mr. 265, Sheilla, Sipe and Tayo. They performed the Stomp part of the Extravaganza. They performed a story showing struggle and survival in the city. Team 2 was called Urban Pulse. The members of the team were Arthur, Ellah, Frankie, Goitse, M'am Bea, Macky 2, Nhlanhla, Permithias, Samantha and Trezagah. They performed the Shadow Dance part of the Extravaganza. They performed a story focusing on the hustle in the city.

Downtown Beats was the winning team and gained immunity from nominations, meaning that Urban Pulse were going to face the nomination dagger.

=== Week 5 ===
This week, the Extravaganza theme was called Comedy of Errors This means that the housemates had to perform a comedy skit involving references form the William Shakespeare plays. Head of House, Idris chose the following two teams:

Team 1 was given the theme O Yea of Conspiracy. The members of the team were Butterphly, Ellah, Frankie, Goitse, Idris, Macky 2, Mr. 265 and Sipe. Team 2 was given the theme The Strangeness of Strangers. The members of the team were JJ, M'am Bea, Nhlanhla, Permithias, Samantha, Sheilla, Tayo and Trezagah.

The Strangeness of Strangers was the winning team and gained immunity from nominations, meaning that O Yea of Conspiracy were going to face the nomination dagger.

=== Week 6 ===
This week, the Extravaganza theme was called A Pernod Ricard Modern Drama. This means that the housemates had to perform a story with a character Bible and outline a story for the modern drama. Head of House, Sipe chose the following two teams:

Team 1 had to perform a Nollywood Movie. The members of the team were Ellah, Goitse, Macky 2, Mr. 265, Sheilla, Sipe and Tayo. They performed an alcohol warning message that is church related. The name of their play was called Tom's Tavern.

Team 2 had to perform a Modern Soapie. The members of the team were Butterphly, Idris, JJ, M'am Bea, Nhlanhla, Samantha and Trezagah. They performed an alcohol message that is family based. The name of their play is called Charlie's Cocktail Bar

This week, the teams were not competing for immunity, but for home messages from their loved ones.

Team 2 was the winning team and received home messages from their loved ones. Unfortunately, Team 1 received nothing.

=== Week 7 ===
There was no Extravaganza this week.

== Twists ==
=== Star-Meter ===
This season, a twist has been added. It is called the Star-Meter. Each week, IK will ask a question to the viewers on which Housemate qualifies for the asked question. The Housemate with the most votes will receive a prize from Big Brother the following Monday. These are the Star-Meter questions as follows:

Week	Question	Housemate
2	Which Big Brother Hotshots Housemate has the X-Factor?	Tayo
3	Which Big Brother Hotshots Housemate is the sexiest?	Tayo
4	Which Big Brother Hotshots Housemate is the sneakiest?	Macky 2
5	Which Big Brother Hotshots Housemate is the laziest?	Samantha
6	Which Big Brother Hotshots Housemate is the funniest?	Macky 2
7	Which Big Brother Hotshots Housemate is the craziest?	Sipe
8	Which Big Brother Hotshots Housemate has got what it takes to win?	Sipe

=== Return of the exes ===
On Day 42, another twist has been added. Ten ex-housemates had returned to compete against the current housemates. Each ex-housemate was from a country that was still competing in the game. The current housemates had to compete to impress Africa to keep them. If the housemate was not good enough for the fans, then that ex-housemate would replace him/her.

These were the ten ex-housemates:

- Botswana's Peo from season 6.
- Ghana's Elikem from season 8.
- Malawi's Natasha from season 8.
- Mozambique's Leonel from season 4.
- Nigeria's Uti from season 3 and season 5.
- South Africa's Luclay from season 6.
- Tanzania's Feza from season 8.
- Uganda's Denzel from season 8.
- Zambia's Sulu from season 8.
- Zimbabwe's Vimbai from season 6.

However, this was a prank that Big Brother played to the housemates which will see how the housemates will cope against their competition. The ex-housemates were not competing for the money, but were sent by Big Brother to cause havoc in the house.

The exes left on Day 49.

== Nomination history ==
	Week 1	Week 2	Week 3	Week 4	Week 5	Week 6	Week 7	Week 8	Week 9 Final	
Idris	Nominated	Frankie, Permithias	Permithias, JJ	Macky 2, Sheilla	Frankie, Trezagah	Mr. 265, Sipe	No nominations	Sheilla, Tayo	Winner (Day 63)	
Tayo	Nominated	JJ, Permithias	Alusa, JJ	Luis, Sheilla	Samantha, Ellah	Mr. 265, Macky 2	No nominations	Macky 2, Idris	Runner-Up (Day 63)	
Macky 2	Nominated	Laveda, Frankie	Laveda, Ellah	Nhlanhla, Sheilla	Nhlanhla, Ellah	Idris, Ellah	No nominations	Tayo, Nhlanhla	3rd Place (Day 63)	
Nhlanhla	Nominated	Tayo, Sabina	Idris, Alusa	Mr. 265, Macky 2	Frankie, Trezagah	Idris, Mr. 265	No nominations	Macky 2, Idris	4th Place (Day 63)	
JJ	Nominated	Lilian, Laveda	Laveda, M'am Bea	Sheilla, Arthur	Goitse, Trezagah	Mr. 265, Sipe	No nominations	Goitse, Sipe	5th Place (Day 63)	
Sipe	Nominated	Tayo, Permithias	Nhlanhla, Kacey Moore	Samantha, Kacey Moore	Frankie, Nhlanhla	Idris, Butterphly	No nominations	JJ, Goitse	6th Place (Day 63)	
M'am Bea	Nominated	Esther, Sabina	Nhlanhla, Laveda	Macky 2, Luis	Macky 2, Samantha	Butterphly, Macky 2	No nominations	Goitse, Macky 2	7th Place (Day 63)	
Butterphly	Nominated	Frankie, Esther	Nhlanhla, Laveda	Sheilla, Kacey Moore	Trezagah, Permithias	Mr. 265, Macky 2	No nominations	Sheilla, Macky 2	8th Place (Day 63)	
Ellah	Nominated	Tayo, Laveda	Laveda, Permithias	Sheilla, Macky 2	Frankie, Macky 2	Mr. 265, Macky 2	No nominations	Tayo, Sheilla	Evicted (Day 56)	
Goitse	Nominated	Esther, Lilian	Ellah, Alusa	Macky 2, Luis	Permithias, Ellah	Macky 2, Idris	No nominations	JJ, Tayo	Evicted (Day 56)	
Sheilla	Nominated	Frankie, Permithias	Laveda, JJ	Arthur, Macky 2	Trezagah, Permithias	Sipe, Mr. 265	Head of House	Idris, Sipe	Evicted (Day 56)	
Trezagah	Nominated	Samantha, Esther	Nhlanhla, Permithias	Kacey Moore, Luis	Ellah, M'am Bea	Butterphly, Sipe	No nominations	Butterphly, Sipe	Evicted (Day 56)	
Samantha	Nominated	Frankie, Arthur	Laveda, M'am Bea	Mr. 265, Macky 2	Frankie, Trezagah	Sipe, Ellah	Evicted (Day 42)			
Mr. 265	Nominated	Permithias, Arthur	Laveda, Permithias	Permithias, Arthur	Ellah, Nhlanhla	Ellah, Idris	Evicted (Day 42)			
Permithias	Nominated	Tayo, Frankie	Kacey Moore, Ellah	Mr. 265, Macky 2	Trezagah, Ellah	Evicted (Day 35)				
Frankie	Nominated	Tayo, JJ	Permithias, Nhlanhla	Sheilla, Macky 2	Nhlanhla, Trezagah	Evicted (Day 35)				
Luis	Nominated	Alusa, JJ	JJ, Laveda	Sheilla, Mr. 265	Evicted (Day 28)					
Kacey Moore	Nominated	Frankie, Sabina	Laveda, Permithias	Sheilla, Permithias	Evicted (Day 28)					
Arthur	Nominated	JJ, Sabina	Laveda, Nhlanhla	Sheilla, Mr. 265	Evicted (Day 28)					
Alusa	Nominated	Esther, Tayo	Permithias, Nhlanhla	Evicted (Day 21)						
Laveda	Head of House	JJ, Frankie	M'am Bea, Nhlanhla	Evicted (Day 21)						
Sabina	Nominated	Lilian, Tayo	Evicted (Day 14)							
Esther	Nominated	JJ, Permithias	Evicted (Day 14)							
Lilian	Nominated	JJ, Alusa	Evicted (Day 14)							
Mira	Nominated	Evicted (Day 7)								
Resa	Nominated	Evicted (Day 7)								
Head of House	Laveda	Samantha	Nhlanhla	JJ	Idris	Sipe	Sheilla	Macky 2	none	
Up for eviction	All; Housemates	Ellah, Esther, Frankie, JJ, Laveda, Lilian, Permithias, Sabina, Tayo	Alusa, Ellah, JJ, Laveda, M'am Bea, Macky 2, Permithias	Arthur, Frankie, Kacey Moore, Luis, Macky 2, Mr. 265, Sheilla	Butterphly, Ellah, Frankie, Nhlanhla, Permithias, Trezagah	Goitse, Idris, Macky 2, Mr. 265, Samantha	none	Ellah, Goitse, Idris, JJ, Sheilla, Sipe, Tayo, Trezagah	Butterphly, Idris, JJ, M'Am Bea, Macky 2, Nhlanhlah, Sipe, Tayo	
Evicted	Mira; 0 of 14 votes to save	Sabina; 1 of 14 votes to save	Alusa; 1 of 14 votes to save	Arthur; 1 of 14 votes to save	Frankie; 1 of 14 votes to save	Mr. 265; 2 of 14 votes to save	none	Ellah; 1 of 14 votes to save	Butterphly; 0 of 14 votes to win	M'am Bea; 1 of 14 to win
Evicted	Mira; 0 of 14 votes to save	Sabina; 1 of 14 votes to save	Alusa; 1 of 14 votes to save	Arthur; 1 of 14 votes to save	Frankie; 1 of 14 votes to save	Mr. 265; 2 of 14 votes to save	none	Goitse; 1 of 14 votes to save	Sipe; 1 of 14 to win	JJ; 1 of 14 to win
Evicted	Resa; 0 of 14 votes to save	Esther; 0 of 14 votes to save	Laveda; 1 of 14 votes to save	Kacey Moore; 1 of 14 votes to save	Permithias; 1 of 14 votes to save	Samantha; 1 of 14 votes to save	none	Sheilla; 1 of 14 votes to save	Nhlanhla; 2 of 14 votes to win	Macky 2; 2 of 14 votes to win
Evicted	Resa; 0 of 14 votes to save	Lilian; 0 of 14 votes to save	Laveda; 1 of 14 votes to save	Luis; 1 of 14 votes to save	Permithias; 1 of 14 votes to save	Samantha; 1 of 14 votes to save	none	Trezagah; 1 of 14 votes to save	Tayo; 2 of 14 votes to win	
Survived	Macky 2; 2 of 14 votes to save Arthur; Butterphly; Esther; Goitse; Idris; M'am Bea; Nhlanhla; Permithias; Sabina; Sipe; Tayo; Trezagah; 1 of 14 votes to save each Alusa; Ellah; Frankie; JJ; Kacey Moore; Lilian; Luis; Mr. 265; Samantha; Sheilla; 0 of 14 votes to save each	JJ; 5 of 14 votes to save Tayo; 3 of 14 votes to save Permithias; 2 of 14 votes to save Ellah; 1 of 14 votes to save Frankie; 1 of 14 votes to save Laveda; 1 of 14 votes to save	Macky 2; 4 of 14 votes to save JJ; 3 of 14 votes to save Ellah; 2 of 14 votes to save M'am Bea; 2 of 14 votes to save Permithias; 1 of 14 votes to save	Frankie; 3 of 14 votes to save Macky 2; 3 of 14 votes to save Sheilla; 3 of 14 votes to save Mr. 265; 2 of 14 votes to save	Ellah; 4 of 14 votes to save Trezagah; 4 of 14 votes to save Butterphly; 2 of 14 votes to save Nhlanhla; 2 of 14 votes to save	Goitse; 4 of 14 votes to save Idris; 4 of 14 votes to save Macky 2; 3 of 14 votes to save	none	Tayo; 4 of 14 votes to save Idris; 3 of 14 votes to save Sipe; 2 of 14 votes to save JJ; 1 of 14 votes to save	Idris; 5 of 14 votes to win	

== Nominations total received ==
	Week 1	Week 2	Week 3	Week 4	Week 5	Week 6	Week 7	Week 8	Week 9	Total
Idris	0	0	1	0	0	5	0	3	Winner	9
Tayo	0	7	0	0	0	0	0	4	Runner-Up	11
Macky 2	0	0	0	9	2	5	0	4	3rd Place	20
Nhlanhla	0	0	8	1	4	0	0	1	4th Place	14
JJ	0	7	4	0	0	0	0	2	5th Place	13
Sipe	0	0	0	0	0	5	0	3	6th Place	8
M'am Bea	0	0	3	0	1	0	0	0	7th Place	4
Butterphly	0	0	0	0	0	3	0	1	8th Place	4
Ellah	0	0	3	0	6	3	0	0	Evicted	12
Goitse	0	0	0	0	1	0	0	3	Evicted	4
Sheilla	0	0	0	10	0	0	0	3	Evicted	13
Trezagah	0	0	0	0	8	0	0	0	Evicted	8
Samantha	0	1	0	1	2	0	Evicted			4
Mr. 265	0	0	0	5	0	7	Evicted			12
Permithias	0	6	7	2	3	Evicted				18
Frankie	0	8	0	0	5	Evicted				13
Luis	0	0	0	4	Evicted					4
Kacey Moore	0	0	2	3	Evicted					5
Arthur	0	2	0	3	Evicted					5
Alusa	0	2	3	Evicted						5
Laveda	0	3	11	Evicted						14
Sabina	0	4	Evicted							4
Esther	0	5	Evicted							5
Lilian	0	3	Evicted							3
Mira	0	Evicted								0
Resa	0	Evicted								0

Legend:
Head of House of the week.
Nominated for the week.
Immune from nomininations for the week.
No nominations were available that week.

== Voting history ==
	Week 1	Week 2	Week 3	Week 4	Week 5	Week 6	Week 7	Week 8	Week 9
Botswana	Goitse	JJ	Macky 2	Sheilla	Nhlanhla	Goitse	No Eviction	Goitse	Nhlanhla
Ghana	M'am Bea	Tayo	M'am Bea	Kacey Moore	Ellah	Idris	No Eviction	Tayo	M'am Bea
Kenya	Sabina	Sabina	Alusa	Frankie	Ellah	Idris	No Eviction	Idris	Idris
Malawi	Sipe	JJ	Macky 2	Mr. 265	Butterphly	Mr. 265	No Eviction	Sipe	Sipe
Mozambique	Trezagah	JJ	JJ	Macky 2	Trezagah	Goitse	No Eviction	Trezagah	Tayo
Namibia	Permithias	Permithias	Permithias	Luis	Permithias	Macky 2	No Eviction	Idris	Idris
Nigeria	Tayo	Tayo	M'am Bea	Sheilla	Trezagah	Goitse	No Eviction	Tayo	Tayo
Rwanda	Arthur	Frankie	Ellah	Arthur	Frankie	Goitse	No Eviction	Tayo	Idris
South Africa	Nhlanhla	JJ	JJ	Sheilla	Nhlanhla	Samantha	No Eviction	Sheilla	Nhlanhla
Tanzania	Idris	Laveda	Laveda	Frankie	Ellah	Idris	No Eviction	Idris	Idris
Uganda	Esther	Ellah	Ellah	Frankie	Ellah	Idris	No Eviction	Ellah	Idris
Zambia	Macky 2	Permithias	Macky 2	Macky 2	Trezagah	Macky 2	No Eviction	Sipe	Macky 2
Zimbabwe	Butterphly	JJ	JJ	Mr. 265	Butterphly	Mr. 265	No Eviction	JJ	JJ
Rest of Africa	Macky 2	Tayo	Macky 2	Macky 2	Trezagah	Macky 2	No Eviction	Tayo	Macky 2

Survivor(s) of the vote.

== Nomination and voting notes ==
=== Week 1 ===
On Day 1, the twenty six housemates were told by Big Brother to perform their talents on stage. He said that the top housemate will be Head of House while the bottom twenty five will be up for eviction.
Laveda had the highest score in her performance, so she became the Head of House and immune for the week.
Therefore, Alusa, Arthur, Butterphly, Ellah, Esther, Frankie, Goitse, Idris, JJ, Kacey Moore, Lilian, Luis, M'am Bea, Macky 2, Mira, Mr. 265, Nhlanhla, Permithias, Resa, Sabina, Samantha, Sheilla, Sipe, Tayo and Trezagah were up for eviction for the week.

This week, viewers voted for the housemate they wanted to save and these were the results:

- Macky 2 received 2 votes to save: Zambia and Rest of Africa.
- Arthur received 1 vote to save: Rwanda.
- Butterphly received 1 vote to save: Zimbabwe.
- Esther received 1 vote to save: Uganda.
- Goitse received 1 vote to save: Botswana.
- Idris received 1 vote to save: Tanzania.
- M'am Bea received 1 vote to save: Ghana.
- Nhlanhla received 1 vote to save: South Africa.
- Permithias received 1 vote to save: Namibia.
- Sabina received 1 vote to save: Kenya.
- Sipe received 1 vote to save: Malawi.
- Tayo received 1 vote to save: Nigeria.
- Trezagah received 1 vote to save: Mozambique.
- Alusa, Ellah, Frankie, JJ, Kacey Moore, Lilian, Luis, Mira, Mr. 265, Resa, Samantha, and Sheilla received no votes* to save.

*The tie-breaker rule applied to Alusa, Ellah, Frankie, JJ, Kacey Moore, Lilian, Luis, Mira, Mr. 265, Resa, Samantha and Sheilla where the number of votes for the housemate were divided by the 14 regions to get the average percentage. Mira and Resa had the lowest average percentages.

On Day 7, Resa and Mira were evicted.

=== Week 2 ===
On Day 8, nominations occurred. Since Team Waka Waka Mou won the Extravaganza, they were immune from nominations unless the Head of House puts them up for eviction.

The housemates that received the most nominations were Esther, Frankie, JJ, Laveda, Lilian, Permithias, Sabina and Tayo.
Head of House, Samantha decided to add Ellah on the nominees list.
Therefore, Ellah, Esther, Frankie, JJ, Laveda, Lilian, Permithias, Sabina and Tayo were up for eviction for the week.

This week, viewers voted for the housemate they wanted to save and these were the results:

- JJ received 5 votes to save: Botswana, Malawi, Mozambique, South Africa and Zimbabwe.
- Tayo received 3 votes to save: Ghana, Nigeria and Rest of Africa.
- Permithias received 2 votes to save: Namibia and Zambia.
- Ellah received 1 vote* to save: Uganda.
- Frankie received 1 vote* to save: Rwanda.
- Laveda received 1 vote* to save: Tanzania.
- Sabina received 1 vote* to save: Kenya.
- Esther and Lilian received no votes to save.

*The tie-breaker rule applied to Ellah, Frankie, Laveda and Sabina where the number of votes for the housemate were divided by the 14 regions to get the average percentage. Sabina had the lowest average percentage.

On Day 14, Lilian, Esther and Sabina were evicted.

=== Week 3 ===
On Day 15, nominations occurred. Since the Gold Team won the Extravaganza, they were immune from nominations unless the Head of House puts them up for eviction.

The housemates that received the most nominations were Alusa, Ellah, JJ, Laveda, M'am Bea, Nhlanhla and Permithias.
Since Nhlanhla was the week's Head of House, he became immune from possible eviction. He decided to add Macky 2 on the nominees list.
Therefore, Alusa, Ellah, JJ, Laveda, M'am Bea, Macky 2 and Permithias were up for eviction for the week.

This week, viewers voted for the housemate they wanted to save and these were the results:

- Macky 2 received 4 votes to save: Botswana, Malawi, Zambia and Rest of Africa.
- JJ received 3 votes to save: Mozambique, South Africa and Zimbabwe.
- Ellah received 2 votes to save: Rwanda and Uganda.
- M'am Bea received 2 votes to save: Ghana and Nigeria.
- Alusa received 1 vote* to save: Kenya.
- Laveda received 1 vote* to save: Tanzania.
- Permithias received 1 vote* to save: Namibia.

*The tie-breaker rule applied to Alusa, Laveda and Permithias where the number of votes for the housemate were divided by the 14 regions to get the average percentage. Alusa and Laveda had the lowest average percentages.

On Day 21, Laveda and Alusa were evicted.

=== Week 4 ===
On Day 22, nominations occurred. Since Forest Fantasy won the Extravaganza, they were immune from nominations unless the Head of House puts them up for eviction.

The housemates that received the most nominations were Arthur, Kacey Moore, Luis, Macky 2, Mr. 265 and Sheilla.
Head of House, JJ decided to add Frankie on the nominees list.
Therefore, Arthur, Frankie, Kacey Moore, Luis, Macky 2, Mr. 265 and Sheilla were up for eviction for the week.

This week, viewers voted for the housemate they wanted to save and these were the results:

- Frankie received 3 votes to save: Kenya, Tanzania and Uganda.
- Macky 2 received 3 votes to save: Mozambique, Zambia and Rest of Africa.
- Sheilla received 3 votes to save: Botswana, Nigeria and South Africa.
- Mr. 265 received 2 votes to save: Malawi and Zimbabwe.
- Arthur received 1 vote to save: Rwanda.
- Kacey Moore received 1 vote to save: Ghana.
- Luis received 1 vote to save: Namibia.

On Day 28, Arthur, Kacey Moore and Luis were evicted.

=== Week 5 ===
On Day 29, nominations occurred. Since Downtown Beats won the Extravaganza, they were immune from nominations unless the Head of House puts them up for eviction.

The housemates that received the most nominations were Ellah, Frankie, Nhlanhla, Permithias and Trezagah.
Head of House, Idris decided to add Butterphly on the nominees list.
Therefore, Butterphly, Ellah, Frankie, Nhlanhla, Permithias and Trezagah were up for eviction for the week.

This week, viewers voted for the housemate they wanted to save and these were the results:

- Ellah received 4 votes to save: Ghana, Kenya, Tanzania and Uganda.
- Trezagah received 4 votes to save: Mozambique, Nigeria, Zambia and Rest of Africa.
- Butterphly received 2 votes to save: Malawi and Zimbabwe.
- Nhlanhla received 2 votes to save: Botswana and South Africa.
- Frankie received 1 vote to save: Rwanda.
- Permithias received 1 vote to save: Namibia.

On Day 35, Frankie and Permithias were evicted.

=== Week 6 ===
On Day 36, nominations occurred. Since The Strangeness of Strangers won the Extravaganza, they were immune from nominations unless the Head of House puts them up for eviction.

The housemates that received the most nominations were Idris, Macky 2, Mr. 265 and Sipe.
Since Sipe was the week's Head of House, she became immune from possible eviction. She decided to add Samantha on the nominees list.
Also, last week on Day 32, Goitse broke a Big Brother rule. She deliberately moved during the Freeze task. As a result, Big Brother automatically put her up for eviction as punishment.
Therefore, Goitse, Idris, Macky 2, Mr. 265 and Samantha were up for eviction for the week.

This week, viewers voted for the housemate they wanted to save and these were the results:

- Goitse received 4 votes to save: Botswana, Mozambique, Nigeria and Rwanda.
- Idris received 4 votes to save: Ghana, Kenya, Tanzania and Uganda.
- Macky 2 received 3 votes to save: Namibia, Zambia and the rest of Africa.
- Mr. 265 received 2 votes to save: Malawi and Zimbabwe.
- Samantha received 1 vote to save: South Africa.

On Day 42, Mr. 265 and Samantha were evicted.

=== Week 7 ===
This week, there were no nominations or evictions due to the Return of the exes twist Big Brother brought up.

=== Week 8 ===
On Day 50, nominations occurred. There was no Extravaganza, so that made all housemate eligible for nominations.

The housemates that received the most nominations were Goitse, Idris, JJ, Macky 2, Sheilla, Sipe and Tayo.
Since Macky 2 was the week's Head of House, he became immune from possible eviction. He decided to add Ellah on the nominees list.
Also, last week on Day 43, Trezagah broke a Big Brother rule. He deliberately moved during the Freeze task. As a result, Big Brother automatically put him up for eviction as punishment.
Therefore, Ellah, Goitse, Idris, JJ, Sheilla, Sipe, Tayo and Trezagah were up for eviction for the week.

This week, viewers voted for the housemate they wanted to save and these were the results:

- Tayo received 4 votes to save: Ghana, Nigeria, Rwanda and the rest of Africa.
- Idris received 3 votes to save: Kenya, Namibia and Tanzania.
- Sipe received 2 votes to save: Malawi and Zambia.
- Ellah received 1 vote* to save: Uganda.
- Goitse received 1 vote* to save: Botswana.
- JJ received 1 vote* to save: Zimbabwe.
- Sheilla received 1 vote* to save: South Africa.
- Trezagah received 1 vote* to save: Mozambique.

*The tie-breaker rule applied to Ellah, Goitse, JJ, Sheilla and Trezagah where the number of votes for the housemate were divided by the 14 regions to get the average percentage. Ellah, Goitse, Sheilla and Trezagah had the lowest average percentages.

On Day 56, Ellah, Goitse, Sheilla and Trezagah were evicted.

=== Week 9 ===
Butterphly, Idris, JJ, M'am Bea, Macky 2, Nhlanhla, Sipe and Tayo are the finalists of the season. The final eight were competing for the grand prize of US$300,000.

This week, viewers voted for the housemate they wanted to win and these were the results:

- Idris won the season with 5 votes to win: Kenya, Namibia, Rwanda, Tanzania and Uganda.
- Tayo became the runner-up with 2 votes to win: Mozambique and Nigeria.
- Macky 2 finished in 3rd place with 2 votes to win: Zambia and the rest of Africa.
- Nhlanhla finished in 4th place with 2 votes to win: Botswana and South Africa.
- JJ finished in 5th place with 1 vote to win: Zimbabwe.
- Sipe finished in 6th place with 1 vote to win: Malawi.
- M'am Bea finished in 7th place with 1 vote to win: Ghana.
- Butterphly finished in 8th place with no votes to win.
