= Big Brother Africa season 5 =

Big Brother Africa
- Season 5
- No. of days: 91
- No. of housemates: 14
- Winner: Uti
- Runner-up: Munya

Season chronology
- ← Previous; Season 4 Next → Season 6

Big Brother Africa 5 (also known as Big Brother Africa: All-Stars) was the fifth season of the Big Brother Africa reality television series produced by Endemol. The season premiered on Sunday, July 18, 2010 and was broadcast by M-Net and M-NetAfrica for 91 days, concluding on October 17, 2010 when Nigeria's Uti was crowned the ultimate winner. Each week the Housemates nominated two of their own and the public voted to either save or evict them until only 5 Housemates remained on finale night. The grand prize for this season was initially $200,000, however, due to the strike that took place on Day 6, the grand prize was decreased by ten percent meaning that the winner will now receive $180,000. Since that incident and toward the end of the series, the grand prize has been reinstated as $200,000 although this reinstatement was never formally announced to the housemates and the public. 14 African countries took part in this year's series, namely: Angola, Botswana, Ethiopia, Ghana, Kenya, Malawi, Mozambique, Namibia, Nigeria, South Africa, Tanzania, Uganda, Zambia and Zimbabwe). This season also use some of the game mechanics from the Secret Story franchise.

== Format ==
The format introduced during the fourth season returned for this edition. The public voted to save their favorite housemate from eviction from the House. This edition featured past Housemates from the first four seasons returning to the House for another chance to win.

=== Secrets ===
Each Housemate entered the House with a personal secret that they had to protect. Each Housemate entered the House with their own personal vault with $1,000. Big Brother gave the Housemates an optional task of discovering each other's secrets. For each time a Housemate discovers another Housemate's secret they automatically gain all the cash in their personal vault. If a Housemate is able to keep their secret until they are evicted they will keep all the money in their vault. However if a Housemate reveals their secret to another Housemate they will lose the money in their vault and occur other penalties. This is a game mechanics from the Secret Story franchise.

=== The Barn ===
In a twist from previous seasons a new area of the House was introduced called "The Barn". On Day 14, following the eviction of Hannington and Sammi, Big Brother revealed that this year all evicted housemates will move to the "Barn", where they will live for an undisclosed amount of time. Eventually, some of the housemates living in the barn may return to the main house. In comparison to the main house the barn is a more simple house. Those who lived in the barn received visits from others they know family members, friends, and significant others (boyfriend/girlfriend etc..). The barn official closed down on day 77.

On Saturday nights dubbed "All-Star Saturday Night('s)", both housemates and barnmates had performances from various DJ's/Performers from the various African countries of the continent. Performances from musicians and entertainers also occurred during the live eviction shows, the launch show, and the final show.

== Housemates ==
Name	Real/Full Name	Age on entry	Country	Big Brother Africa history		Secret	Discovered by	Day entered	Day exited	Result	Refs
Name	Real/Full Name	Age on entry	Country	Season	Result	Secret	Discovered by	Day entered	Day exited	Result	Refs
Uti	Uti Nwachukwu	27	Nigeria	Season 3	Evicted	"Was a Britney Spears fan"	Undiscovered	1	91	Winner	
Munya	Munyaradzi Chidzonga	24	Zimbabwe	Season 3	3rd Place	"Kissed another man while he was acting in a movie"	Himself (Day 14)	1	91	Runner-up	
Lerato	Lerato Sengadi	26	South Africa	Season 2	Evicted	"Has a piercing in a strange place"	Tatiana	1	91	3rd Place	
Mwisho	Mwisho Mwampamba	29	Tanzania	Season 1	Runner-up	"Is dating two girls at the same time"	Undiscovered	1	91	4th Place	
Sheila	Sheila Patricia Kwamboka	25	Kenya	Season 3	Evicted	"Has a phobia of short people"	Undiscovered	1	91	5th Place	
Tatiana	Tatiana Durão	29	Angola	Season 2	3rd Place	"She can sing well, but no one has ever heard her sing"	Undiscovered	1	84	Evicted	
Kaone	Kaone Ramontshonyana	26	Botswana	Season 4	Evicted	"Was arrested after assaulting a friend with a bowl of eggs"	Tatiana (Day 84)	1	84	Evicted	
Paloma	Paloma Manda	26	Zambia	Season 4	Evicted	"She peed in her pants after trying weed"	Undiscovered	1	77	Evicted	
Meryl	Meryl Shikwambane	24	Namibia	Season 2	Evicted	"Having an affair with a Namibian celebrity"	Undiscovered	1	77	Evicted	
Code	Code Sangala	34	Malawi	Season 2	Evicted	"Has been celibate for seven months"	Undiscovered	1	77	Evicted	
Jennifer	Jennifer Mussanhane	23	Mozambique	Season 4	Walked	"Ran away and eloped with a man who was 30 when she was 16"	Undiscovered	1	77	Evicted	
Hannington	Hannington Kuteesa	24	Uganda	Season 4	Evicted	"Had a fight with his girlfriend's mother"	Himself (Day 14)	1	61	Ejected	
Yacob	Yacob Yehdego	28	Ethiopia	Season 4	Evicted	"Has never been in love"	Undiscovered	1	50	Walked	
Sammi	Samuel Kwame Bampoe	35	Ghana	Season 1	Evicted	"Had an illegitimate child who died"	Himself (Day 14)	1	33	Walked	

== Summary ==
Week 1 On day 1 during the live premiere, all 14 houseguests entered the Big Brother house; Sean Paul also performed his songs "Temperature", "Hold My Hand", and "So Fine". The houseguests bet 100% of the budget on the weekly task and ultimately lost. On day 2, Lerato and Mwisho were up for eviction. During a random draw of balls from a bag, Tatiana became the 1st Head of House. On Day 6, Housemates staged a protest in the Diary Room due to the lack of food in the house. The housemates went as far as covering all the cameras and windows within the Diary Room with blankets and sheets. With Big Brother not giving in, the Housemates decided to break down a door that would leave them outside of the house. Big Brother called in Head of House Tatiana to the Diary Room but was followed with the rest of the housemates. Security guards were brought into the house to bring order; that order failed as the housemates then held the guards hostage. Big Brother demanded the housemates to release the guards. Big Brother told the housemates to try to maintain with the current food in the house till Monday, much to the displeasure to the rest of the house. Later, Big Brother supplied housemates with food. The Housemates later apologized for their actions and thanked Big Brother. On Day 7, Kaone and Tatiana were fake evicted and returned to the house soon after. A new area of the house, the Barn, was also revealed to the public.

Week 2 On day 8 Big Brother deducted 10% of the prize money for the winner of the show. Tatiana, Sammi and Uti were nominated with Tatiana saving herself as the Head of House therefore making Hannigton, Sammi and Uti the nominees for eviction for the week. On day 9 the houseguests wagered 50% and won their task which tested their fears dubbed "Horror Island". On Day 12, Hannington won the Head of House Task which involved the houseguests competing to see who could scream the loudest. Ghanaian musical group Ruff 'n Smooth performed during the eviction show. On day 14 Hannigton and Sammi were evicted than placed into "The Barn". Tatiana remained Head of House.

Week 3 On day 15, Munya and Tatiana were up for eviction; Tatiana saved herself making Munya and Lerato the final nominees for eviction. On day 20, Sheila became the Head of House. The Housemates had to write down as many African countries as they knew. There was a three-way tie between Munya, Mwisho and Sheila and Sheila later won a quiz on naming capital cities of selected African countries. On day 21, Lerato was evicted and went to the barn.; Mr O (Tshaba Tshutshu) a dj/music mixer spun discs for the housemates later that night.

Week 4 On day 22, Munya and Tatiana were up for eviction. During the "Supermodels of Mars" task the houseguests wagered 100% of their weekly budget and won. On day 27, Mix master Joe (Joseph Mwenda) a dj/mixer, performed for the housemates. On day 28, Tatiana was evicted and went to the barn.

Week 5 On day 29, Kaone, Munya, and Yacob were nominated for eviction (each with 6 votes); Kaone as Head of House removed himself making Meryl, Munya, and Yacob the final nominees for the week. This week's task requires the housemates to build a model of their ideal Big Brother House. The Barnmates wagered 75% while Housemates wagered 100%; the Barnmates were successful while the housemates lost the task this week. On day 33, Tatiana attempted to escape the confines of the barn. Also Sammi was forced to leave The Barn due to medical concerns. On day 34, Dj/music mixer DJ Bego performed for the housemates. On day 35, Yacob was evicted and sent to the barn; fashion model and musician Kenyan Liz (Elizabeth) ‘Loye’ Ogumbo performed during the live eviction show.

Week 6 On day 36, Jen became the replacement head of house due to Yacob's eviction. Code and Munya were nominated for eviction; Jen saved Code so Munya and Sheila were nominated for eviction. Both Housemates and the Barnmates wagered 75% on the task "Big Brother All Stars Radio", which required the contestants to set up a radio station; the Barnmates were successful in the task. For the Head Of House task the housemates sat in front of a conveyor belt and identified as many food items on a conveyor as possible, while blindfolded. They then had one minute to write all items they remembered; Mwisho won the task. On day 41, Tanzanian dj, DJ Steve performed for the houseguests. On day 42, Sheila was evicted and entered the barn.

Week 7 On day 43, Big Brother announced the three Housemates up for eviction: Uti, Mwisho and Code. As Head of House Mwisho chose to save himself and place Munya up for eviction for the sixth time in a row. Therefore Uti, Munya and Code and the final nominees for the week. On day 49, Zimbabwean performer Stunner performed during the live eviction show and Code was evicted and entered the barn.

Week 8 On day 50, both Meryl and Mwisho were nominated; Meryl saved herself as Head of House and put Paloma in her place making Mwisho and Paloma as the final nominees for the week. Yacob also walked from the barn and the game of Big Brother Africa. For the Head of House task the housemates were required to break free from caterpillar suites and will then fly across a line to the other side of the garden; Uti won and became the new Head of House while the other housemates thought he cheated during the task (it was easier for him to break out of his suit). On day 55, Zambian DJ "Gesh" (Chishala Chitoshi Jr)performed for the housemates. On day 56, Paloma was evicted and entered the barn.

Week 9 On day 57, Jennifer and Uti were nominated for eviction; Uti as Head of House removed himself from nomination making Jennifer and Munya the final nominees for the week. For this week's task the housemates and barnmates will participate in tasks which will raise awareness about malaria; both the housemates and the barnmates wagered 100% for the task. On day 58, Lerato and Hannington got into a physical fight. This led to both Lerato and Hannington seeing a psychologist and having a consultation on both days 58 and 59. Big Brother stated that the barnmates are "on probation" and there will be no more warning for inappropriate behavior. On day 61, Hannington was disqualified and evicted from the Big Brother House due to the fight with Lerato on day 58. Because of these events Big Brother issued the following punishments; Lerato is unable to nominate for the remainder of the game and they may not consume any alcohol and will be required to do dish washing duties while remaining in the barn. In addition, alcohol will be removed from next week's shopping list. On day 62, Ghanaian DJ "Killer Fingers" from Y107.9FM performed for the housemates and they also saw video messages from loved ones. On day 63, Jennifer was evicted to the barn.

Week 10 On day 64, Munya, Kaone, Mwisho and Uti were nominated for eviction; as head of house Munya removed himself from eviction and replaced himself with Meryl making Meryl, Kaone, Mwisho and Uti the final nominees for the week. On day 69, DJ Pink Panther (Panther Luiz Figuerado) performed for the housemates. On day 70, Meryl was evicted and entered the barn; some former housemates performed including Kwaku (season 2), Mimi (season 3), Kevin (winner season 4), Elizabeth (season 4) and Emma (season 4).

Week 11 On day 71, it was revealed that no housemate will be evicted; from all the barnmates two will be returning to the house this coming week. Tatiana won a bean eating contest (to see if the contestants could live on the staples of cowboys). On day 75, Mwisho earned his second straight Head of House(his 3rd overall). On day 76, Nigerian “DJ Waxxy”(Oluseye Abiodun Olayanju) performed for the houseguests. On day 77, Nigerian singer-songwriter and Dentist Dr SID (Sidney Onoriode Esiri) performed prior to the housemate return; barnmates Sheila and Tatiana(she had more individual votes than Paloma) returned to the main house and are eligible for the grand prize, and were joined by Lerato, who returned to the house after a game of luck, while all the other barnmates were officially evicted from the Big Brother game. Opera singer Bongiwe Madlala performed to official close down the barn.

Week 12 On day 78, Kaone, Munya, Mwisho and Uti were all up for possible eviction; Mwisho as Head of House saved himself and replaced himself with Tatiana making Tatiana, Kaone, Munya, Uti the final nominees for the week. On day 83, Nigerian DJ Caise performed for the housemates. On day 84, prior to the eviction former Mozambican contestant Leonel "Dj Wizard" performed with his band GPRO; Kaone and Tatiana were evicted with no save votes from the house in a double eviction. Tatiana made $3000 after discovering three of her housemates secrets and a R50 000 holiday courtesy of the SA Tourism. Mwisho became the new Head of House for the third consecutive week (his fourth overall) and the last one of the season.

Week 13 Housemates Munya, Lerato, Mwisho, Sheila, and Uti became the finalists and became eligible for the grand prize. On day 90, Zambian DJ Gesh (Chishala Chitoshi Jr) for the second time this season and South African performer C-Live performed for the finale "All-Star Saturday Night" of the season in a Halloween themed show. Big Brother Africa 5: All Stars ended after 91 days on October 17, 2010. The 2 hour finale included performances by: South African DJ Black Coffee, Nigerian hip hop singer/songwriter 2Face, East African R&B & reggae artist Wyre, rapper MI, and Maye Hunta featuring Vector and Culture who made waves with the “African Star” Big Brother theme song. When the votes were revealed Sheila took 5th place, Mwisho can in 4th, and Lerato came in 3rd each with no votes to win; Munya had 7 votes as runner-up making Uti with 8 votes the winner. Although Munya lost, a consortium of business people from Zimbabwe gave Munya US$300 000 as they felt he deserved to win the prize money and the voting system was flawed. Following within these events, Multichoice also arranged a consolation prize for him.

== Nominations Table ==
A record of the nominations cast, stored in a nominations table, shows how each Housemate nominated other Housemates throughout his or her time in the house. The Head of House can choose to save a nominated Housemate each week and nominate another Housemate to face the public vote. Twists to the normal nominations process are noted, such as immunity from nomination and eviction (referred to as "exempt").

Housemates living in the barn

	Week 1	Week 2	Week 3	Week 4	Week 5	Week 6	Week 7	Week 8	Week 9	Week 10	Week 11		Week 12	Week 13 Final		Nominations received
Uti	Yacob, Paloma	Paloma, Sammi	Munya, Tatiana	Tatiana, Kaone	Code, Kaone	Paloma, Code	Paloma, Code	Paloma, Jennifer	Jennifer, Munya	Munya, Kaone	~~Mwisho,~~; ~~Kaone~~		Kaone, Munya	Winner (Day 91)		38
Munya	Paloma, Sammi	Uti, Sammi	Uti, Yacob	Uti, Yacob	Uti, Yacob	Sheila, Uti	Mwisho, Uti	Uti, Meryl	Jennifer, Mwisho	Meryl, Uti	~~Mwisho,~~; ~~Kaone~~		Uti, Mwisho	Runner-up (Day 91)		39
Lerato	Jennifer, Mwisho	Sammi, Tatiana	Tatiana, Munya	Tatiana, Sheila	Munya, Yacob	Munya, Jen	Jennifer, Code	Jennifer, Paloma	Kaone, Jennifer	Banned	Banned		Banned	Third place (Day 91)		10
Mwisho	Refused	Uti, Hannington	Uti, Sheila	Tatiana, Kaone	Munya, Kaone	Kaone, Code	Kaone, Code	Kaone, Munya	Kaone, Munya	Kaone, Uti	~~Munya,~~; ~~Kaone~~		Kaone, Munya	Fourth place (Day 91)		34
Sheila	Lerato, Sammi	Sammi, Mwisho	Tatiana, Munya	Kaone, Tatiana	Kaone, Code	Jen, Code	Paloma, Jennifer	Jennifer, Paloma	Jennifer, Kaone	Munya, Kaone	~~Mwisho,~~; ~~Kaone~~		Kaone, Mwisho	Fifth place (Day 91)		21
Tatiana	Yacob, Lerato	Hannington, Uti	Lerato, Sheila	Uti, Sheila	Sheila, Mwisho	Uti, Mwisho	Mwisho, Uti	Uti, Mwisho	Uti, Mwisho	Mwisho, Uti	~~Mwisho,~~; ~~Uti~~		Kaone, Munya	Evicted (Day 84)		17
Kaone	Lerato, Meryl	Tatiana, Meryl	Tatiana, Meryl	Sheila, Meryl	Meryl, Mwisho	Jen, Code	Mwisho, Meryl	Meryl, Uti	Uti, Meryl	Meryl, Mwisho	~~Mwisho,~~; ~~Uti~~		Uti, Sheila	Evicted (Day 84)		33
Paloma	Sheila, Sammi	Mwisho, Lerato	Meryl, Munya	Sheila, Uti	Code, Yacob	Mwisho, Munya	Mwisho, Munya	Mwisho, Meryl	Uti, Meryl	Meryl, Mwisho	~~Kaone,~~; ~~Mwisho~~		Evicted (Day 77)			12
Meryl	Sammi, Jennifer	Yacob, Sammi	Munya, Tatiana	Kaone, Tatiana	Code, Munya	Code, Paloma	Paloma, Kaone	Munya, Kaone	Munya, Jennifer	Kaone, Munya	~~Mwisho,~~; ~~Kaone~~		Evicted (Day 77)			25
Code	Yacob, Mwisho	Lerato, Sheila	Meryl, Lerato	Yacob, Sheila	Kaone, Yacob	Sheila, Uti	Meryl, Uti	Mwisho, Meryl	Uti, Munya	Munya, Uti	~~Mwisho,~~; ~~Uti~~		Evicted (Day 77)			16
Jennifer	Sheila, Code	Meryl, Lerato	Munya, Sheila	Uti, Meryl	Yacob, Munya	Sheila, Munya	Uti, Meryl	Munya, Mwisho	Uti, Meryl	Mwisho, Munya	~~Mwisho,~~; ~~Munya~~		Evicted (Day 77)			15
Hannington	Paloma, Lerato	Sammi, Tatiana	Tatiana, Munya	Tatiana, Sheila	Yacob, Kaone	Munya, Jennifer	Mwisho, Jennifer	Meryl, Kaone	Uti, Meryl	Ejected (Day 61)						4
Yacob	Code, Lerato	Uti, Tatiana	Tatiana, Meryl	Sheila, Uti	Kaone, Munya	Munya, Code	Munya, Code	Walked (Day 50)								13
Sammi	Jennifer, Hannington	Hannington, Uti	Munya, Sheila	Munya, Sheila	Munya, Sheila	Walked (Day 33)										10
Nomination notes	1	2	3	none	4	none				5	6		none	7		
Nominated (pre-HoH)	none	Sammi; Tatiana; Uti	Munya; Tatiana	Sheila; Tatiana	Kaone; Munya; Yacob	Code; Munya	Code; Mwisho; Uti	Meryl; Mwisho	Jennifer; Uti	Kaone; Munya; Mwisho; Uti	none		Kaone; Munya; Mwisho; Uti	none		
Head of House	none	Tatiana	~~Hannington~~; Tatiana	Sheila	~~Tatiana~~; Kaone	Jennifer	Mwisho	Meryl	Uti	Munya	Mwisho		Mwisho	Mwisho		
Saved	none	Tatiana	Tatiana	Sheila	Kaone	Code	Mwisho	Meryl	Uti	Munya	none		Mwisho	none		
Against public vote	All; Housemates	Hannington, Sammi, Uti	Lerato, Munya	Munya, Tatiana	Meryl, Munya, Yacob	Munya, Sheila	Code, Munya, Uti	Mwisho, Paloma	Jennifer, Munya	Kaone, Meryl, Mwisho, Uti	Code, Jennifer, Lerato, Meryl, Paloma, Sheila, Tatiana		Kaone, Munya, Tatiana, Uti	Lerato, Munya, Mwisho, Sheila, Uti		
Evicted	Kaone; Fewest points to save	Hannington; Fewest points to save	Lerato; Fewest points to save	Tatiana; 3 of 15 votes to save	Yacob; 0 of 15 votes to save	Sheila; 5 of 15 votes to save	Code; 1 of 15 votes to save	Paloma; 6 of 15 votes to save	Jennifer; 1 of 15 votes to save	Meryl; 0 of 15 votes to save	Jennifer; 0 of 15 votes to return	~~Lerato~~; ~~1 of 15 votes~~ ~~to return~~	Kaone; 0 of 15 votes to save	Sheila; 0 of 15 votes to win	Mwisho; 0 of 15 votes to win	
Evicted	Kaone; Fewest points to save	Hannington; Fewest points to save	Lerato; Fewest points to save	Tatiana; 3 of 15 votes to save	Yacob; 0 of 15 votes to save	Sheila; 5 of 15 votes to save	Code; 1 of 15 votes to save	Paloma; 6 of 15 votes to save	Jennifer; 1 of 15 votes to save	Meryl; 0 of 15 votes to save	Meryl; 1 of 15 votes to return	Code; 1 of 15 votes to return	Kaone; 0 of 15 votes to save	Lerato; 0 of 15 votes to win	Munya; 7 of 15 votes to win	
Evicted	Tatiana; Fewest points to save	Sammi; Fewest points to save	Lerato; Fewest points to save	Tatiana; 3 of 15 votes to save	Yacob; 0 of 15 votes to save	Sheila; 5 of 15 votes to save	Code; 1 of 15 votes to save	Paloma; 6 of 15 votes to save	Jennifer; 1 of 15 votes to save	Meryl; 0 of 15 votes to save	Meryl; 1 of 15 votes to return	Code; 1 of 15 votes to return	Tatiana; 0 of 15 votes to save	Lerato; 0 of 15 votes to win	Munya; 7 of 15 votes to win	
Evicted	Tatiana; Fewest points to save	Sammi; Fewest points to save	Lerato; Fewest points to save	Tatiana; 3 of 15 votes to save	Yacob; 0 of 15 votes to save	Sheila; 5 of 15 votes to save	Code; 1 of 15 votes to save	Paloma; 6 of 15 votes to save	Jennifer; 1 of 15 votes to save	Meryl; 0 of 15 votes to save	Paloma; 2 of 15 votes to return	Lerato; Chosen to return	Tatiana; 0 of 15 votes to save	Uti; 8 of 15 votes to win		

=== Notes ===
- ^Note 1: On Day 2, Housemates were each asked to nominate two of their fellow housemates for eviction. Mwisho refused to nominate and as punishment was automatically nominated for eviction by Big Brother. Following the first round of nominations, Big Brother decided to disregard the original nomination results and to nominate all housemates for eviction.
- ^Note 2: Starting with Week 2's eviction, all evicted Housemates were actually not evicted and moved into a secret House called The Barn. Whilst in The Barn, all housemates could still have the power to nominate, but The Barn Housemates could not be nominated, as they were presumed to be evicted.
- ^Note 3: As Hannington was evicted at the end of Week 2, the Head of House power was given to Tatiana because she finished in second place at the Head of House competition.
- ^Note 4: As Tatiana was evicted at the end of Week 4, the Head of House power was given to Kaone because he finished in second place at the Head of House competition.
- ^Note 5: As part of her punishment for the fight she had with Hannington, from Week 10 on, Lerato will not be eligible to nominate.
- ^Note 6: In Week 11, all nominations were voided and all barn Housemates were automatically nominated for eviction. Following the barnmates eviction in week 11, those who had not been initially saved by the public took part in a random drawing in order to determine who would be the last barnmate to re-enter the main House. Lerato was chosen and re-entered the House.
- ^Note 7: Week 13 was the final week. The public was voting for a winner.

== Summary ==
week 3

- Munya received 12 votes to save: Angola, Botswana, Ethiopia, Ghana, Malawi, Mozambique, Namibia, Uganda, Tanzania, Zambia, Zimbabwe and the Rest of Africa
- Lerato received 3 votes to save: Kenya, Nigeria, and South Africa

Week 4

- Munya received 12 votes to save: Botswana, Ethiopia, Ghana, Malawi, Mozambique, Namibia, Nigeria, South Africa, Uganda, Zambia, Zimbabwe and the Rest of Africa.
- Tatianna received 3 votes to save: Angola, Kenya and Tanzania

Week 5

- Munya received 12 votes to save: Botswana, Ethiopia, Ghana, Malawi, Mozambique, Namibia, South Africa, Tanzania, Zambia, Zimbabwe, Uganda and the Rest of Africa.
- Meryl received 3 votes to save: Angola, Kenya and Nigeria.
- Yacob received no votes to save.

Week 6

- Munya had 10 votes to save: Botswana, Ghana, Malawi, Namibia, South Africa, Tanzania, Zambia, Zimbabwe, Uganda and the Rest of Africa.
- Sheila had 5 votes to save: Angola, Ethiopia, Kenya, Mozambique and Nigeria.

Week 7

- Uti received 8 votes to save: Angola, Ethiopia, Ghana, Kenya, Mozambique, Nigeria, Tanzania and Uganda.
- Munya received 6 votes to save: Botswana, Namibia, South Africa, Zambia, Zimbabwe and the Rest of Africa.
- Code received 1 vote to save: his home country, Malawi.

Week 8

- Mwisho received 9 votes to save: Angola, Ethiopia, Ghana, Kenya, Mozambique, Nigeria, Tanzania, Uganda and the Rest of Africa.
- Paloma received 6 votes to save: Botswana, Malawi, Namibia, South Africa, Zambia and Zimbabwe.

Week 9

- Munya received 14 votes to save: Angola, Botswana, Ethiopia, Ghana, Kenya, Mozambique, Malawi, Namibia, South Africa, Tanzania, Zambia, Zimbabwe, Uganda and the Rest of Africa.
- Jennifer received 1 votes to save: Nigeria.

Week 10

- Uti received 8 votes to save: Angola, Ethiopia, Ghana, Kenya, Mozambique, Nigeria, Uganda and the Rest of Africa.
- Kaone received 6 votes to save: Botswana, Malawi, Namibia, South Africa, Zambia and Zimbabwe.
- Mwisho received 1 votes to save: Tanzania
- Meryl received 0 votes to save.

Week 11

- Sheila received 8 votes to return: Ethiopia, Kenya, Mozambique, Namibia, Nigeria, Zimbabwe, Uganda and the Rest of Africa.
- Tatiana received 2 votes to return: Botswana and Ghana. (Based on more individual votes)
- Paloma received 2 votes to return: Angola and Zambia.
- Code received 1 vote to return: Malawi.
- Lerato received 1 vote to return: South Africa.
- Meryl received 1 vote to return: Tanzania.
- Jen received 0 votes to return.
  - Up until this week all evicted housemates were sent to the barn
  - Code, Jen, Meryl, and Paloma were officially evicted from the Big Brother House.

Week 12

- Munya received 9 votes to save: Botswana, Ghana, Malawi, Mozambique, Namibia, South Africa, Tanzania, Zambia and Zimbabwe.
- Uti received 6 votes to save: Angola, Ethiopia, Kenya, Nigeria, Uganda and the Rest of Africa.
- Kaone received 0 votes to save.
- Tatiana received 0 votes to save.
  - Kaone and Tatiana were evicted in a double eviction.

Week 13

- For the final week, viewers voted for the winner of the series.
  - Uti received 8 votes and won the show: Angola, Ethiopia, Ghana, Kenya, Mozambique, Nigeria, Uganda and the Rest of Africa.
  - Munya received 7 votes to win and finished in 2nd place: Botswana, Malawi, Namibia, South Africa, Tanzania, Zambia and Zimbabwe.
  - Lerato received 0 votes to win and finished in 3rd place.
  - Mwisho received 0 votes to win and finished in 4th place.
  - Sheila received 0 votes to win and finished in 5th place.
