= Kevin Chuwang =

Winner of Big Brother Africa reality show Season 4, Nigerian entertainment consultant

Kevin Chuwang Pam
- Born: 9 January 1982 (age 44); Jos, Nigeria
- Occupation: Entertainment consultancy
- Years active: 2009 - present
- Known for: Winner of the Big Brother Africa (season 4)
- Spouse: Elizabeth Gupta (m. 2011–2016)
- Children: 2

Kevin Chuwang Pam (born 9 January 1982) was the winner of the Season 4 of Big Brother Africa in 2009. He has a bachelor's degree in English language from the University of Jos.

== Early life ==
Chuwang was born on 9 January 1982 and grew up in Dogon Dutse, outskirts of Jos, the Plateau State capital in Middle Belt Nigeria. He has seven siblings.

== Career ==
Chuwang earlier in 2006 while serving in the National Youth Service Corps scheme in Lagos, participated in The Next Movie Star, a Nigerian Reality TV show sponsored by Haier Thermocool in which he came out second runner-up. In what was to bring him to a broader lamplight, he got into the Big Brother Africa (season 4) race and after beating 24 other contestants from 14 African countries emerged winner, taking home a grand prize of $200,000 on 6 December 2009. His father was present with him in the closing event in South Africa.

In July 2012, View Point Nigeria reported that the Big Brother Africa (BBA) 2009 winner on Friday 12 July 2013 in Jos began a new musical talent hunt TV reality show under the entertainment label, Down to Earth Projects Ltd., his own enterprise, tagged "Jos Bring it on", in which 20 selected participants housed somewhere in the city of Jos contest for a prize of N500,000.

He is the CEO of Down2Earth Entertainment and of Naija Pikin, an NGO he founded. He is also does entertainment consultancy.

== Personal life ==
Chuwang was married to Elizabeth "Liz" Gupta, a fellow housemate of his whom he met in 2009 at the Big Brother Africa Revolution House She hails from Tanzania and her late father was Indian. Their wedding took place on February 26, 2011 in Abuja, Nigeria. The couple have 2 children, Malaika (born August 2011) and Angelo (born October 2014).

In 2015, he explained to Encomium Weekly his family's relocation to Jos.

In May 2016, the Chuwang and his wife alongside former participants in the Big Brother Africa reality show, Uti Nwachukwu and Nkenna Iwuagwu attended the wedding of another colleague, Geraldine Iheme in Lagos.

Chuwang and Gupta divorced in 2016.

He currently lives in Tanzania where he does stand up comedy.
