= Big Brother Africa season 1 =

Season of television series

Big Brother Africa
- Season 1
- No. of days: 106
- No. of housemates: 12
- Winner: Cherise
- Runner-up: Mwisho

Series chronology
- Next → Season 2

Big Brother Africa 1 was the first season of the reality television series Big Brother Africa produced by Endemol for M-Net. The show began on 25 May 2003 and ended on 7 September of the same year, lasting 106 days, with Cherise Makubale being crowned the very first winner of the show. Mark Pilgrim was the host.

== Housemates ==
Name	Real/full name	Age	Occupation	Country	Day entered	Day exited	Status
Cherise	Cherise Makubale	24	Procurement officer	Zambia	1	106	Winner
Mwisho	Mwisho Mwampamba	22	Self-employed	Tanzania	1	106	Runner-up
Tapuwa	Tapuwa Mhere	26	Public relations officer	Zimbabwe	1	106	3rd place
Warona	Warona Masego Setshwaelo	25	Video editor	Botswana	1	106	4th place
Gaetano	Gaetano Juko Kagwa	30	Student	Uganda	1	106	5th place
Stefan	Stefan Ludik	22	Forensic psycho-physiologist	Namibia	1	98	Evicted
Bayo	Alexander Adebayo Adetomiwa Okoh	28	Economist	Nigeria	1	91	Evicted
Abby	Abergail Brigette Plaatjies	25	Fraud consultant	South Africa	1	84	Evicted
Sammi	Samuel Kwame Bampoe	28	Radio presenter	Ghana	1	70	Evicted
Alex	Alexander Kasembeli Holi	21	Student	Kenya	1	56	Evicted
Zein	Zein Dudha	27	Marketing manager	Malawi	1	42	Evicted
Bruna	Bruna Tatiana Lemas Estevão	25	Singer and model	Angola	1	28	Evicted

== Nominations table ==
	Week 4	Week 6	Week 8	Week 10	Week 12	Week 13	Week 14	Week 15 Final		Nominations received
Cherise	No; Nominations	Alex, Zein	Stefan, Warona	Bayo, Warona	Mwisho, Stefan	Mwisho, Warona	Stefan, Tapuwa	Winner (Day 106)		7
Mwisho	No; Nominations	Alex, Stefan	Alex, Gaetano	Abby, Gaetano	Abby, Cherise	Cherise, Gaetano	Tapuwa, Warona	Runner-up (Day 106)		11
Tapuwa	No; Nominations	Abby, Zein	Alex, Sammi	Sammi, Warona	Stefan, Warona	Gaetano, Warona	Stefan, Warona	Third place (Day 106)		12
Warona	No; Nominations	Bayo, Tapuwa	Bayo, Tapuwa	Mwisho, Sammi	Abby, Gaetano	Cherise, Gaetano	Mwisho, Tapuwa	Fourth place (Day 106)		13
Gaetano	No; Nominations	In Big Brother UK House	Bayo, Cherise	Cherise, Stefan	Cherise, Mwisho	Bayo, Stefan	Mwisho, Stefan	Fifth place (Day 106)		12
Stefan	No; Nominations	Bayo, Tapuwa	Bayo, Tapuwa	Bayo, Tapuwa	Abby, Gaetano	Bayo, Mwisho	Gaetano, Mwisho	Evicted (Day 98)		13
Bayo	No; Nominations	Stefan, Warona	Stefan, Warona	Stefan, Warona	Gaetano, Mwisho	Gaetano, Tapuwa	Evicted (Day 91)			12
Abby	No; Nominations	Tapuwa, Zein	Alex, Stefan	Mwisho, Sammi	Bayo, Cherise	Evicted (Day 84)				5
Sammi	No; Nominations	Warona, Zein	Gaetano, Warona	Gaetano, Mwisho	Evicted (Day 70)					6
Alex	No; Nominations	Bayo, Tapuwa	Sammi, Tapuwa	Evicted (Day 56)						5
Zein	No; Nominations	Bayo, Sammi	Evicted (Day 42)							4
Bruna	No; Nominations	Evicted (Day 28)								N/A
Nomination note	1	2	none					3		
Against public vote	All; Housemates	Bayo, Tapuwa, Zein	Alex, Bayo, Stefan, Tapuwa, Warona	Mwisho, Sammi, Warona	Abby, Cherise, Gaetano, Mwisho	Bayo, Cherise, Gaetano, Mwisho, Warona	Mwisho, Stefan, Tapuwa	Cherise, Gaetano, Mwisho, Tapuwa, Warona		
Evicted	Bruna; 6 of 13 votes to evict	Zein; 10 of 13 votes to evict	Alex; 8 of 13 votes to evict	Sammi; 8 of 13 votes to evict	Abby; 11 of 13 votes to evict	Bayo; 9 of 13 votes to evict	Stefan; 7 of 13 votes to evict	Gaetano; 1 of 13 votes to win	Warona; 2 of 13 votes to win	
Evicted	Bruna; 6 of 13 votes to evict	Zein; 10 of 13 votes to evict	Alex; 8 of 13 votes to evict	Sammi; 8 of 13 votes to evict	Abby; 11 of 13 votes to evict	Bayo; 9 of 13 votes to evict	Stefan; 7 of 13 votes to evict	Tapuwa; 2 of 13 votes to win	Mwisho; 2 of 13 votes to win	
Evicted	Bruna; 6 of 13 votes to evict	Zein; 10 of 13 votes to evict	Alex; 8 of 13 votes to evict	Sammi; 8 of 13 votes to evict	Abby; 11 of 13 votes to evict	Bayo; 9 of 13 votes to evict	Stefan; 7 of 13 votes to evict	Cherise; 6 of 13 votes to win		

=== Notes ===
- ^Note 1: No nominations were held in Week 4 as all Housemates faced the public vote.
- ^Note 2: During Week 6, Gaetano was taking part in the Big brother swap after winning a task. He was swapped with Cameron from the Big Brother UK House. Because of this, Gaetano was exempt from nominations this week.
- ^Note 3: During the Final Week, the public voted to win, rather than to evict.

== Swap with the Big Brother UK house ==
Big Brother Africa contestant Gaetano Kagwa swapped places with Big Brother UK contestant Cameron Stout. Gaetano (known as Gae), a Ugandan law student, was chosen to join Big Brother UK after passing a cocktail-making challenge. He caused upset in the Big Brother UK house when he called contestant Tania "a piggy", causing her to walk off in tears and threaten to leave the UK house for good.

== Facts ==
The season was shown in America on the Africa Channel. It aired from November 2008 to March 2009. It was the first non-American Big Brother shown in United States.

It was the only Big Brother from the African series to use its specific eye logo design with the series using a completely different design from season 2 onwards.
