= Big Brother Africa season 6 =

Big Brother Africa
- Season 6
- No. of days: 91
- No. of housemates: 26
- Winners: Karen and Wendall

Season chronology
- ← Previous; Season 5 Next → Season 7

Big Brother Africa 6 (also known as Big Brother Africa: Amplified) was the sixth season of the reality television series Big Brother Africa produced by Endemol for M-Net which began airing on 1 May 2011 and ran for 91 days until 31 July 2011. This year Mnet co-partnered with Coca-Cola for the season. Ikponmwosa "IK" Osakioduwa came back to host the show for the third time in a row. The launch show was also broadcast live through the official website. This year the contestants will move into a brand new house. South African band BLKJKS (Blackjacks) performed their song 'Mzabalazo'; Busta Rhymes also performed during the 2 hour launch show.

== Format ==
There were twenty six housemates this season and lived in the same house (Heads House) for one week. On Day 7, eleven of the twenty six moved to a different house (Tails House) during the live eviction show. The housemates were competing for US$400,000. On Day 42, it was announced that there were going to be two winners who will each receive US$200,000. This year, fourteen countries participated in the season. Each country had at least one representative for them. All fourteen countries were returning countries and these were Angola, Botswana, Ethiopia, Ghana, Kenya, Malawi, Mozambique, Namibia, Nigeria, South Africa, Tanzania, Uganda, Zambia and Zimbabwe.

== Housemates ==
On Day 1, twenty six housemates entered the House on launch night.

Name	Real/Full Name	Age	Occupation	Country	Entry day	Exit day	Status
Karen	Karen Igho	27	Unemployed	Nigeria	1	91	Winner
Wendall	Wendall Robert Parson	23	Commercial Pilot	Zimbabwe	1	91	Winner
Luclay	Clayton Misoya	28	Actor & Acting Coach	South Africa	1	91	3rd Place
Lomwe	Tendai Namate	27	DJ	Malawi	1	91	4th Place
Sharon	Sharon Salmon Nalukenge	25	Musician & Fashion Designer	Uganda	1	91	5th Place
Hanni	Hanni Mekuria	22	Singer & Law Student	Ethiopia	1	91	6th Place
Vina	Malvina Longpet	26	Radio Presenter	Nigeria	1	91	7th Place
Millicent	Millicent Mugadi	28	Actress & Soccer Player	Kenya	1	84	Evicted
Kim	Kimberly Musonda	25	Beautician	Zambia	1	84	Evicted
Vimbai	Vimbai Muthiniri	24	Model	Zimbabwe	1	84	Evicted
Mumba	Mumba Mwakwa	24	DJ & Radio Presenter	Zambia	1	77	Evicted
Zeus	Game Bantsi	24	Entrepreneur	Botswana	1	77	Evicted
Bernadina	Bernadina Buys	21	Administration Clerk	Namibia	1	77	Evicted
Weza	Weza Solunga	26	TV Presenter	Angola	1	70	Evicted
Peo	Peo Sebotho	24	Journalist & Film Graduate	Botswana	1	70	Evicted
Alex	Alexander Biney	31	Self-Employed Designer	Ghana	1	70	Evicted
Felicia	Felicia Susan Ngoma	24	Purchaser	Malawi	1	56	Evicted
Nic	Nicholas Wangondu	26	TV Producer	Kenya	1	49	Evicted
Danny	Daniel Kassa	34	Salesman & Stylist	Ethiopia	1	49	Evicted
Confidence	Confidence Haugen	37	CEO	Ghana	1	42	Evicted
Ernest	Ernest Wasake	28	Consultant	Uganda	1	35	Evicted
Bhoke	Bhoke Egina	26	TV Broadcaster	Tanzania	1	35	Evicted
Michael	Michael Zuane	32	Hairdresser & Designer	Mozambique	1	28	Evicted
Nkuli	Nkuli Ngquola	23	Community TV Intern	South Africa	1	21	Evicted
Lotus	Lotus Kyamba	24	TV Presenter	Tanzania	1	19	Ejected
Jossy	Joseph Ailonga	28	Marketing, Sales & Advertising Manager	Namibia	1	14	Evicted

== Twists ==
=== Fuse ===
This season, a twist known as the Fuse took place since Day 35. The Fuse was a punishment that was given to housemate(s) for a week until the live eviction show. The fuses were given to them by the evicted housemates. The Fuse is similar to the "Molotov Cocktail" in season 4 and the "Dagger" in season 5.

Week	Fuse	Armed Housemate	Inflicted Housemate
6	This housemate had to prepare a hot drink for Big Brother and sing a lullaby to him.	Bhoke	Ernest
6	This housemate had to use pom poms and act like a cheerleader whenever Katy Perry's "Firework" played.	Ernest	Nic
8	This housemate had to hug and kiss nearby housemates whenever someones laughs out loud.	Danny	Alex
8	This housemate had to shout "I am amplified!" whenever Big Brother makes an announcement.	Nic	Luclay
11	This housemate had to put on different clown faces every day.	Peo	Mumba
11	This housemate had to make everyone's bed.	Alex	Weza
11	This housemate had to pack their clothes and leave them in the storeroom while borrowing their fellow housemates' clothes.	Weza	Karen
12	This housemate was prevented from receiving any messages from home.	Bernadina	Luclay
12	This housemate had to wear a floral swimming cap.	Zeus	Wendall
12	This housemate had to walk backwards.	Mumba	Luclay

== Nominations table ==
	Week 2	Week 3	Week 4	Week 5	Week 6	Week 7	Week 8	Week 10	Week 11	Week 12	Week 13 Final		Nominations received
Karen	Exempt	Alex, Kim	Exempt	Ernest, Bhoke	Exempt	Nic, Danny	Exempt	Refused	Vimbai, Wendall	Refused	Winner (Day 91)		15
Wendall	Vina, Jossy	Exempt	Sharon, Vina	Exempt	Vina, Zeus	Exempt	Sharon, Vina	Sharon, Vina	Zeus, Vina	Kim, Millicent	Winner (Day 91)		16
Luclay	Exempt	Refused	Exempt	Ernest, Kim	Exempt	Kim, Mumba	Exempt	Bernadina, Peo	Zeus, Bernadina	Refused	Third place (Day 91)		13
Lomwe	Millicent, Sharon	Exempt	Confidence, Hanni	Exempt	Weza, Confidence	Exempt	Sharon, Hanni	Weza, Sharon	Hanni, Mumba	Hanni, Luclay	Fourth place (Day 91)		5
Sharon	Zeus, Jossy	Exempt	Vimbai, Hanni	Exempt	Zeus, Hanni	Exempt	Zeus, Vimbai	Peo, Alex	Zeus, Wendall	Vimbai, Karen	Fifth place (Day 91)		11
Hanni	Vimbai, Sharon	Exempt	Wendall, Bernadina	Exempt	Felicia, Millicent	Exempt	Zeus, Millicent	Alex, Peo	Zeus, Bernadina	Refused	Sixth place (Day 91)		13
Vina	Confidence, Danny	Exempt	Confidence, Sharon	Exempt	Wendall, Millicent	Exempt	Zeus, Wendall	Wendall, Zeus	Wendall, Zeus	Kim, Wendall	Seventh place (Day 91)		16
Millicent	Confidence, Danny	Exempt	Bernadina, Hanni	Exempt	Vina, Hanni	Exempt	Vimbai, Lomwe	Kim, Alex	Wendall, Vina	Wendall, Karen	Evicted (Day 84)		9
Vimbai	Weza, Jossy	Exempt	Michael, Weza	Exempt	Confidence, Zeus	Exempt	Millicent, Lomwe	Karen, Alex	Karen, Zeus	Millicent, Kim	Evicted (Day 84)		9
Kim	Exempt	Karen, Lotus	Exempt	Luclay, Karen	Exempt	Danny, Nic	Exempt	Wendall, Bernadina	Lomwe, Wendall	Vimbai, Vina	Evicted (Day 84)		12
Mumba	Exempt	Peo, Ernest	Exempt	Ernest, Danny	Exempt	Luclay, Danny	Exempt	Peo, Karen	Zeus, Wendall	Evicted (Day 77)			5
Zeus	Vina, Danny	Exempt	Sharon, Bernadina	Exempt	Weza, Vimbai	Exempt	Hanni, Vina	Weza, Sharon	Vina, Kim	Evicted (Day 77)			22
Bernadina	Confidence, Weza	Exempt	Hanne, Michael	Bhoke, Luclay	Exempt	Luclay, Danny	Exempt	Peo, Kim	Wendall, Lomwe	Evicted (Day 77)			8
Weza	Vimbai, Jossy	Exempt	Zeus, Wendall	Exempt	Lomwe, Zeus	Alex, Luclay	Exempt	Millicent, Peo	Evicted (Day 70)				9
Alex	Exempt	Karen, Nkuli	Exempt	Bhoke, Ernest	Exempt	Luclay, Danny	Exempt	Zeus, Karen	Evicted (Day 70)				7
Peo	Exempt	Karen, Nkuli	Exempt	Luclay, Mumba	Exempt	Danny, Luclay	Exempt	Mumba, Weza	Evicted (Day 70)				9
Felicia	Confidence, Danny	Exempt	Vina, Hanni	Exempt	Zeus, Hanni	Exempt	Hanni, Wendall	Evicted (Day 56)					3
Nic	Exempt	Lotus, Nkuli	Exempt	Luclay, Ernest	Exempt	Alex, Luclay	Evicted (Day 49)						2
Danny	Vina, Zeus	Karen, Kim	Exempt	Peo, Ernest	Exempt	Kim, Karen	Evicted (Day 49)						11
Confidence	Michael, Felicia	Exempt	Millicent, Sharon	Exempt	Zeus, Felicia	Evicted (Day 42)							10
Ernest	Exempt	Luclay, Karen	Exempt	Luclay, Mumba	Evicted (Day 35)								7
Bhoke	Exempt	Karen, Nkuli	Exempt	Karen, Bernadina	Evicted (Day 35)								5
Michael	Confidence, Vina	Exempt	Vina, Confidence	Evicted (Day 28)									3
Nkuli	Exempt	Peo, Bhoke	Evicted (Day 21)										4
Lotus	Exempt	Kim, Bhoke	Ejected (Day 19)										2
Jossy	Weza, Zeus	Evicted (Day 14)											4
Nomination note	1	2	3	4	5	6	7	8	9	10	11		
Head of House	Zeus; Bhoke	Weza; Peo	Vimbai; Nic	Millicent; Danny	Lomwe; Bernadina	Felicia; Alex	Vina, Bernadina	Karen	Vimbai	Vina	none		
Nominated (pre-HoH)	Confidence, Danny, Jossy, Vina, Weza, Zeus	Karen, Kim, Luclay, Nkuli	Bernadina, Confidence, Hanni, Sharon, Vina	Bhoke, Ernest, Luclay	Confidence, Felicia, Hanni, Millicent, Vina, Weza, Zeus	Alex, Danny, Kim, Luclay, Nic	Hanni, Lomwe, Millicent, Sharon, Vimbai, Vina, Wendall, Zeus	Alex, Karen, Peo, Sharon, Weza	Bernadina, Lomwe, Vina, Wendall, Zeus	Hanni, Karen, Kim, Luclay, Millicent, Vimbai, Wendall	none		
Saved	Zeus	Karen	Hanni	Luclay	Felicia	Alex	Vina	none	Wendall	Karen	none		
Against public vote	Confidence, Danny, Jossy, Vimbai, Vina, Weza	Kim, Luclay, Mumba, Nkuli	Bernadina, Confidence, Michael, Sharon, Vina	Bhoke, Ernest, Peo	Confidence, Hanni, Millicent, Vimbai, Vina, Weza, Zeus	Danny, Karen, Kim, Luclay, Nic	Felicia, Hanni, Lomwe, Millicent, Sharon, Vimbai, Wendall, Zeus	Alex, Karen, Peo, Sharon, Weza	Bernadina, Lomwe, Mumba, Vina, Zeus	Hanni, Kim, Lomwe, Luclay, Millicent, Vimbai, Wendall	Hanni, Karen, Lomwe, Luclay, Sharon, Vina, Wendall		
Ejected	none	Lotus	none										
Evicted	Jossy; 1 of 15 (9%) to save	Nkuli no votes to save	Michael; 1 of 15 (12.6%) to save	Bhoke; 2 of 15 votes to save	Confidence; 1 of 15 votes to save	Danny; 1 of 15 votes to save	Felicia no votes to save	Peo; 1 of 15 votes to save	Bernadina; 1 of 15 votes to save	Kim; 1 of 15 votes to save	Vina no votes (out of 7)	Hanni; 1 of 15 votes (out of 7)	
Evicted	Jossy; 1 of 15 (9%) to save	Nkuli no votes to save	Michael; 1 of 15 (12.6%) to save	Bhoke; 2 of 15 votes to save	Confidence; 1 of 15 votes to save	Danny; 1 of 15 votes to save	Felicia no votes to save	Alex; 1 of 15 votes to save	Zeus; 2 of 15 votes to save	Vimbai; 1 of 15 votes to save	Sharon; 1 of 15 votes (out of 7)	Lomwe; 1 of 15 votes (out of 7)	
Evicted	Jossy; 1 of 15 (9%) to save	Nkuli no votes to save	Michael; 1 of 15 (12.6%) to save	Ernest; 2 of 15 votes to save	Confidence; 1 of 15 votes to save	Nic; 2 of 15 (12.37%) to save	Felicia no votes to save	Alex; 1 of 15 votes to save	Zeus; 2 of 15 votes to save	Vimbai; 1 of 15 votes to save	Sharon; 1 of 15 votes (out of 7)	Lomwe; 1 of 15 votes (out of 7)	
Evicted	Jossy; 1 of 15 (9%) to save	Nkuli no votes to save	Michael; 1 of 15 (12.6%) to save	Ernest; 2 of 15 votes to save	Confidence; 1 of 15 votes to save	Nic; 2 of 15 (12.37%) to save	Felicia no votes to save	Weza; 2 of 15 votes to save	Mumba; 3 of 15 votes to save	Millicent; 2 of 15 (9.38%) to save	Luclay; 2 of 15 votes (out of 7)		
Saved	Danny; 1 of 15 (11%); Confidence; 1 of 15 (18%); Vimbai; 3 of 15 (17%); Vina; 3 of 15 (20%); Weza; 6 of 15 (25%)	Mumba; 1.5 of 15; Kim; 5.5 of 15; Luclay; 8 of 15	Bernadina; 1 of 15 (17.3%); Confidence; 1 of 15 (19.3%); Sharon; 6 of 15 (22.7%); Vina; 6 of 15 (27.8%)	Peo; 10 of 15	Weza; 1 of 15; Zeus; 1 of 15; Millicent; 2 of 15; Vina; 2 of 15; Hanni; 3 of 15; Vimbai; 5 of 15	Luclay; 2 of 15 (18.86%); Kim; 4 of 15; Karen; 6 of 15	Millicent; 1 of 15 (6.41%); Sharon; 1 of 15 (10.23%); Vimbai; 1 of 15 (12.93%); Lomwe; 2 of 15; Zeus; 2 of 15; Wendall; 3 of 15; Hanni; 5 of 15	Sharon; 3 of 15; Karen; 8 of 15	Vina; 4 of 15; Lomwe; 5 of 15	Lomwe; 2 of 15 (15.02%); Wendall; 2 of 15 (15.42%); Hanni; 2 of 15 (18.98%); Luclay; 5 of 15	Wendall; 4 of 15 votes to win	Karen; 6 of 15 votes to win	

=== Notes ===
- ^Note 1 : All Tails House Housemates were exempt from the nominations process this week. As Head of House of the Heads House, Zeus chose to save himself and nominate Vimbai in his place. As Danny received the second fewest votes to save, he was fake evicted into the Tails House.
- ^Note 2 : All Heads House Housemates were exempt from the nominations process this week. As punishment for refusing to nominate, Luclay also faced the public vote this week. As Head of House of the Tails House, Peo chose to save Karen and nominate Mumba in her place.
- ^Note 3 : All Tails House Housemates were exempt from the nominations process this week. As Head of House of the Heads House, Vimbai chose to save Hanni and nominate Michael as a replacement. As Bernadina received the second fewest votes to save, she was fake evicted into the Tails House.
- ^Note 4 : All Heads House Housemates were exempt from the nominations process this week. As Head of House of the Tails House, Danny chose to save Luclay and nominate Peo the replacement.
- ^Note 5 : All Tails House Housemates were exempt from the nominations process this week. As Head of House of the Heads House, Lomwe chose to save Felicia and nominate Vimbai in her place. As Weza received the second fewest votes to save, she was fake evicted into the Tails House.
- ^Note 6 : All Heads House Housemates were exempt from the nominations process this week. As Head of House of the Tails House, Alex chose to save himself and nominate Karen as his replacement.
- ^Note 7 : All Tails House Housemates were exempt from the nominations process this week. As Head of House of the Heads House, Vina chose to save herself and could only nominate Felicia in her place. As Millicent received the second fewest votes to save, she was fake evicted into the Tails House.
- ^Note 8 : On Day 58, the two houses merged, with the 16 remaining Housemates living under one roof. There was no nominations or eviction in Week 9. Starting with Week 10, any Housemate can be nominated by another Housemate, regardless of previous House affiliation. As punishment for refusing to nominate, Karen also faced the public vote this week. As Head of House, Karen also refused to save anyone, meaning the nominations went unchanged.
- ^Note 9 : As Head of House, Vimbai chose to save Wendall and nominate Mumba in his place.
- ^Note 10 : As punishment for refusing to nominate, Hanni, Karen, & Luclay were automatically nominated by Big Brother. As Head of House, Vina chose to save Karen and replace her with Lomwe.
- ^Note 11 : For the final week, the public were voting to win, rather than to save.

== Voting history ==
	Week 1	Week 2	Week 3	Week 4	Week 5	Week 6	Week 7	Week 8	Week 9	Week 10	Week 11	Week 12	Week 13
Angola	No Eviction	Weza	Luclay	Vina	Peo	Weza	Karen	Hanni	No Eviction	Karen	Mumba	Luclay	Karen
Botswana	No Eviction	Weza	Luclay	Vina	Peo	Zeus	Luclay	Zeus	No Eviction	Peo	Zeus	Luclay	Luclay
Ethiopia	No Eviction	Danny	Luclay	Vina	Peo	Hanni	Danny	Hanni	No Eviction	Weza	Vina	Hanni	Hanni
Ghana	No Eviction	Confidence	Luclay	Confidence	Peo	Confidence	Karen	Hanni	No Eviction	Alex	Vina	Luclay	Karen
Kenya	No Eviction	Vimbai	Kim	Sharon O	Ernest	Millicent	Nic	Millicent	No Eviction	Sharon O	Lomwe	Millicent	Wendall
Malawi	No Eviction	Weza	Kim	Sharon O	Peo	Hanni	Kim	Lomwe	No Eviction	Sharon O	Lomwe	Lomwe	Lomwe
Mozambique	No Eviction	Vimbai	Kim/Mumba	Michael	Peo	Vimbai	Karen	Lomwe	No Eviction	Karen	Lomwe	Lomwe	Karen
Namibia	No Eviction	Jossy	Luclay	Bernadina	Peo	Vimbai	Karen	Wendall	No Eviction	Karen	Bernadina	Wendall	Wendall
Nigeria	No Eviction	Vina	Luclay	Vina	Peo	Vina	Karen	Hanni	No Eviction	Karen	Vina	Hanni	Karen
South Africa	No Eviction	Weza	Luclay	Vina	Peo	Hanni	Luclay	Zeus	No Eviction	Karen	Zeus	Luclay	Luclay
Tanzania	No Eviction	Weza	Kim	Sharon O	Bhoke	Vimbai	Kim	Vimbai	No Eviction	Weza	Lomwe	Vimbai	Karen
Uganda	No Eviction	Vina	Kim	Sharon O	Ernest	Millicent	Nic	Sharon O	No Eviction	Sharon O	Lomwe	Millicent	Sharon O
Zambia	No Eviction	Weza	Kim	Sharon O	Bhoke	Vimbai	Kim	Wendall	No Eviction	Karen	Mumba	Kim	Wendall
Zimbabwe	No Eviction	Vimbai	Mumba	Sharon O	Ernest	Vimbai	Kim	Wendall	No Eviction	Karen	Mumba	Wendall	Wendall
Rest of Africa	No Eviction	Vina	Luclay	Vina	Peo	Vina	Karen	Hanni	No Eviction	Karen	Vina	Luclay	Karen

Survivor(s) of the vote.

== Nominations and voting notes ==
=== Week 1 ===
On Day 1, the twenty six housemates entered Heads House during the launch for the first week of the season. However, Big Brother announced that it was audition week for all housemates. They performed various tasks to show if they are worth the game.

On Day 7 during the live eviction show, it was announced that all housemates passed the auditions and were all given a real chance to compete. All twenty six housemates joined IK on stage during the live eviction show. IK announced that fifteen of the twenty six will return to the Heads House while the remaining eleven will go to a secret house (Tails House). They each had to pick a card that will determine the house they will stay in.

The fifteen housemates that returned to the Heads House were Bernadina, Confidence, Danny, Felicia, Hanni, Jossy, Lomwe, Michael, Millicent, Sharon O, Vimbai, Vina, Wendall, Weza and Zeus.
The eleven housemates that moved to the Tails House were Alex, Bhoke, Ernest, Karen, Kim, Lotus, Luclay, Mumba, Nic, Nkuli and Peo.

=== Week 2 ===
On Day 8, nominations occurred in the Heads House.

The initial nominees were Confidence, Danny, Jossy, Vina, Weza and Zeus.
Head of House, Zeus decided to save himself and replace himself with Vimbai.
Therefore, Confidence, Danny, Jossy, Vimbai, Vina and Weza were up for eviction for the week.

This week, viewers voted for the housemate they wanted to save and these were the results:

- Weza received 6 votes to save: Angola, Botswana, Malawi, South Africa, Tanzania and Zambia.
- Vina received 3 votes to save: Nigeria, Uganda and Rest of Africa.
- Vimbai received 3 votes to save: Kenya, Mozambique and Zimbabwe.
- Confidence received 1 vote* to save: Ghana.
- Danny received 1 vote* to save: Ethiopia.
- Jossy received 1 vote* to save: Namibia.

*The tie-breaker rule applied to Confidence, Danny and Jossy where the number of votes for the housemate were divided by the 15 regions to get the average percentage. Jossy had the lowest average percentage.

On Day 14, Jossy was evicted while Danny moved to the Tails House.

=== Week 3 ===
On Day 15, nominations occurred in the Tails House.

The initial nominees were Karen, Kim, Luclay and Nkuli.
Head of House, Peo decided to save Karen and replace her with Mumba.
Therefore, Kim, Luclay, Mumba and Nkuli were up for eviction for the week.

On Day 19, Big Brother ejected Lotus for slapping Luclay on the face.

This week, viewers voted the housemate they wanted to save and these were the results:

- Luclay received 8 votes to save: Angola, Botswana, Ethiopia, Ghana, Namibia, Nigeria, South Africa and Rest of Africa.
- Kim received 5.5 votes to save: Kenya, Malawi, Mozambique*, Tanzania, Uganda and Zambia.
- Mumba received 1.5 votes to save: Mozambique* and Zimbabwe.
- Nkuli received no votes to save.

*Kim and Mumba shared a vote from Mozambique.

On Day 21, Nkuli was evicted.

=== Week 4 ===
On Day 22, nominations occurred in the Heads House.

The initial nominees were Bernadina, Confidence, Hanni, Sharon O, and Vina.
Head of House, Vimbai decided to save Hanni and replace her with Michael.
Therefore, Bernadina, Confidence, Michael, Sharon O and Vina were up for eviction for the week.

This week, viewers voted for the housemate they wanted to save and these were the results:

- Vina received 6 votes to save: Angola, Botswana, Ethiopia, Nigeria, South Africa and Rest of Africa.
- Sharon O received 6 votes to save: Kenya, Malawi, Tanzania, Uganda, Zambia and Zimbabwe.
- Confidence received 1 vote* to save: Ghana.
- Bernadina received 1 vote* to save: Namibia.
- Michael received 1 vote* to save: Mozambique.

*The tie-breaker rule applied to Bernadina, Confidence and Michael where the number of votes for the housemate were divided by the 15 regions to get the average percentage. Michael had the lowest average percentage.

On Day 28, Michael was evicted while Bernadina moved to the Tails House.

=== Week 5 ===
On Day 29, nominations occurred in the Tails House.

The initial nominees were Bhoke, Ernest and Luclay.
Head of House, Danny decided to save Luclay and replace him with Peo.
Therefore, Bhoke, Ernest and Peo were up for eviction for the week.

This week, viewers voted for the housemate they wanted to save and these were the results:

- Peo received 10 votes to save: Angola, Botswana, Ethiopia, Ghana, Malawi, Mozambique, Namibia, Nigeria, South Africa and Rest of Africa.
- Ernest received 3 votes to save: Kenya, Uganda and Zimbabwe.
- Bhoke received 2 votes to save: Tanzania and Zambia.

On Day 35, Bhoke and Ernest were evicted.

=== Week 6 ===
On Day 36, nominations occurred in the Heads House.

The initial nominees were Confidence, Felicia, Hanni, Millicent, Vina, Weza and Zeus.
Head of House, Lomwe decided to save Felicia and replace her with Vimbai.
Therefore, Confidence, Hanni, Millicent, Vimbai, Vina, Weza and Zeus were up for eviction for the week.

This week, viewers voted for the housemate they wanted to save and these were the results:

- Vimbai received 5 votes to save: Mozambique, Namibia, Tanzania, Zambia and Zimbabwe.
- Hanni received 3 votes to save: Ethiopia, Malawi and South Africa.
- Vina received 2 votes to save: Nigeria and Rest of Africa.
- Millicent received 2 votes to save: Kenya and Uganda.
- Zeus received 1 vote* to save: Botswana.
- Weza received 1 vote* to save: Angola.
- Confidence received 1 vote* to save: Ghana.

*The tie-breaker rule applied to Confidence, Weza and Zeus where the number of votes for the housemate were divided by the 15 regions to get the average percentage. Confidence had the lowest average percentage.

On Day 42, Confidence was evicted while Weza moved to the Tails House.

=== Week 7 ===
On Day 43, nominations occurred in the Tails House.

The initial nominees were Alex, Danny, Kim, Luclay and Nic.
Head of House, Alex decided to save himself and replace himself with Karen.
Therefore, Danny, Karen, Kim, Luclay and Nic were up for eviction for the week.

This week, viewers voted for the housemate they wanted to save and these were the results:

- Karen received 6 votes to save: Angola, Ghana, Mozambique, Namibia, Nigeria and Rest of Africa.
- Kim received 4 votes to save: Malawi, Tanzania, Zambia and Zimbabwe.
- Luclay received 2 votes* to save: Botswana and South Africa.
- Nic received 2 votes* to save: Kenya and Uganda.
- Danny received 1 vote to save: Ethiopia.

*The tie-breaker rule applied to Luclay and Nic where the number of votes for the housemate were divided by the 15 regions to get the average percentage. Nic had the lowest average percentage.

On Day 49, Danny and Nic were evicted.

=== Week 8 ===
On Day 50, nominations occurred on the Heads House.

The initial nominees were Hanni, Lomwe, Millicent, Sharon O, Vimbai, Vina, Wendall and Zeus.
Head of House, Vina decided to save herself and replace herself with Felicia.
Therefore, Felicia, Hanni, Lomwe, Millicent, Sharon O, Vimbai, Wendall and Zeus were up for eviction for the week.

This week, viewers voted for the housemate they wanted to save and these were the results:

- Hanni received 5 votes to save: Angola, Ethiopia, Ghana, Nigeria and Rest of Africa.
- Wendall received 3 votes to save: Namibia, Zambia and Zimbabwe.
- Zeus received 2 votes to save: Botswana and South Africa.
- Lomwe received 2 votes to save: Malawi and Mozambique.
- Vimbai received 1 vote to save: Tanzania.
- Sharon O received 1 vote to save: Uganda.
- Millicent received 1 vote to save: Kenya.
- Felicia received no votes to save.

On Day 56, Felicia was evicted while Millicent moved to the Tails House.

=== Week 9 ===
On Day 57, nominations were supposed to occur in the Tails House, but Big Brother decided surprise the housemates. He called the Heads Housemates to the Diary Room one by one and never returned to the house. Instead, they were placed in several rooms of the Tails House. This indicated that the houses have officially merged and the housemates are now staying in the Tails House.

Due to the merge, there was no eviction since nominations didn't take place.

=== Week 10 ===
On Day 64, nominations occurred. The initial nominees were Alex, Karen, Peo, Sharon O, and Weza.
Head of House, Karen decided to leave the nominations as they were.
Therefore, Alex, Karen, Peo, Sharon O and Weza were up for eviction for the week.

This week, viewers voted for the housemate they wanted to save and these were the results:

- Karen received 8 votes to save: Angola, Mozambique, Namibia, Nigeria, South Africa, Zambia, Zimbabwe and Rest of Africa.
- Sharon O received 3 votes to save: Kenya, Malawi and Uganda.
- Weza received 2 votes to save: Ethiopia and Tanzania.
- Alex received 1 vote to save: Ghana.
- Peo received 1 vote to save: Botswana.

On Day 70, Peo, Alex and Weza were evicted.

=== Week 11 ===
On Day 71, nominations occurred.

The initial nominees were Bernadina, Lomwe, Vina, Wendall and Zeus.
Head of House, Vimbai decided to save Wendall and replace him with Mumba.
Therefore, Bernadina, Lomwe, Mumba, Vina and Zeus were up for eviction for the week.

This week, viewers voted for housemate they wanted to save and these were the results:

- Lomwe received 5 votes to save: Kenya, Malawi, Mozambique, Tanzania and Uganda.
- Vina received 4 votes to save: Ethiopia, Ghana, Nigeria and Rest of Africa.
- Mumba received 3 votes to save: Angola, Zambia and Zimbabwe.
- Zeus received 2 votes to save: Botswana and South Africa.
- Bernadina received 1 vote to save: Namibia.

On Day 77, Bernadina, Zeus and Mumba were evicted.

=== Week 12 ===
On Day 78, nominations occurred.

The initial nominees were Hanni, Karen, Kim, Luclay, Millicent, Vimbai and Wendall.
Head of House, Vina decided to save Karen and replace her with Lomwe.
Therefore, Hanni, Kim, Lomwe, Luclay, Millicent, Vimbai and Wendall were up for eviction for the week.

This week, viewers voted for the housemate they wanted to save and these were the results:

- Luclay received 5 votes to save: Angola, Botswana, Ghana, South Africa and Rest of Africa.
- Hanni received 2 votes* to save: Ethiopia and Nigeria.
- Wendall received 2 votes* to save: Namibia and Zimbabwe.
- Lomwe received 2 votes* to save: Malawi and Mozambique.
- Millicent received 2 votes* to save: Kenya and Uganda.
- Kim received 1 vote to save: Zambia.
- Vimbai received 1 vote to save: Tanzania.

*The tie-breaker rule applied to Hanni, Lomwe, Millicent and Wendall where the number of votes for the housemate were divided by the 15 regions to get the average percentage. Millicent had the lowest average percentage.

On Day 84, Vimbai, Kim and Millicent were evicted.

=== Week 13 ===
Hanni, Karen, Lomwe, Luclay, Sharon O, Vina and Wendall were the finalists of the season. The final seven were competing for the grand prize of US$200,000 each for two housemates.

This week, viewers voted for the housemate they wanted to win and these were the results:

- Karen won the season with 6 votes to win: Angola, Ghana, Mozambique, Nigeria, Tanzania and Rest of Africa.
- Wendall also won the season with 4 votes to win: Kenya, Namibia, Zambia and Zimbabwe.
- Luclay finished in 3rd place with 2 votes to win: Botswana and South Africa.
- Lomwe finished in 4th place with 1 vote to win: Malawi.
- Sharon O finished in 5th place with 1 vote to win: Uganda.
- Hanni finished in 6th place with 1 vote to win: Ethiopia.
- Vina finished in 7th place with no votes to win.

Karen and Wendall won 2011's Amplified season after getting the most votes with 6 and 4 country votes respectively.

== Trivia ==
Jossy, Michael, Confidence and Felicia are the only BB Amplified housemates who never entered the Tails House.

== Controversy ==
- There was controversy about the voting and auditing process after M-Net did not produce proper voting results on day 42. This led to people concluding that the whole show was planned and viewers were fooled that they were the ones influencing voting results as they thought M-Net and Endemol were influencing the game to gain more profits.

Mnet released the clarified results audited and verified by Ernst & Young the following day after the controversy.

- Ernest and Bhoke (the couple dubbed "EBhok") were hugely criticised for having sex in the Big Brother house.
- There was controversy surrounding Luclay's punishment as it was not done accordingly. The punishment involved Luclay taking over all dish washing duties for as long as he is part of the Big brother show. This was not done and viewers felt that it was not fair since Lotus was evicted because of the same confrontation with Luclay.
