= Love Is in the Hair =

2016 Nigerian romantic-comedy

- Directed by: Ansa Kpokpogri; Ayana Saunders
- Written by: Rita C. Onwurah
- Screenplay by: Patrick Namani; Chiji Vivian
- Produced by: Emem Isong
- Starring: Uti Nwachukwu; Ime Bishop Umoh; Okey Bakassi; Toyin Aimakhu; Funny Bone
- Cinematography: Tom Robson
- Edited by: Daniel Tom
- Music by: Awolabi Gbade
- Distributed by: Silverbird Group
- Release date: 2016
- Country: Nigeria
- Language: English

Love Is in the Hair is a 2016 Nigerian romantic-comedy film produced by Emem Isong and directed by Ansa Kpokpogri.

== Cast ==
- Uti Nwachukwu
- Funny Bone
- Okey Bakassi as Jaga
- Ime Bishop Umoh as Johnny
- Toyin Abraham as Constance
- Funky Mallam
- Vani Vyas as Rani
- Micheal Bassey
- Omotu Bissong as Doreen
- Emem Ufot
- Obioma Beulah
- Sonamm Sharma
- Avijit Dutt
