= Big Brother Africa =

Reality TV show

- Genre: Reality competition
- Based on: Big Brother by John de Mol Jr.
- Presented by: Mark Pilgrim; Kabelo Ngakane; Ikponmwosa Osakioduwa
- Starring: Warona Setshwaelo; Gaetano Kagwa; Stefan Ludik; Morris Mugisha; Munya Chidzonga; Uti Nwachukwu; Kevin Chuwang; Lady May; Roki
- Country of origin: South Africa
- No. of series: 9

Production
- Production locations: Johannesburg, South Africa
- Production company: Endemol

Original release
- Network: Various, mainly M-Net, AfricaMagic Entertainment
- Release: 25 May – 7 September 2003
- Release: 5 August 2007 – 7 December 2014

Big Brother Africa is the African version of the international reality television franchise Big Brother created by producer John de Mol Jr. in 1997. The show was first aired in 2003 for one season on M-Net and broadcast to audiences in 42 African countries. In 2007, the show was back from four-year hiatus, until it got cancelled after season nine in 2014.

The African version initially involved 12 countries within Africa (Angola, Botswana, Ghana, Kenya, Malawi, Namibia, Nigeria, South Africa, Tanzania, Uganda, Zambia & Zimbabwe) with two countries (Ethiopia and Mozambique) being added in season 4 and two other countries (Liberia and Sierra Leone) being added in season 7 while Rwanda was added in season 9. Each country provides at least one contestant living in an isolated house while trying to avoid being evicted by viewers and ultimately winning a large cash prize at the end of the show. The show is co-produced by Endemol South Africa.

A special edition of the Big Brother Africa franchise called Big Brother Titans was announced and premiered on 15 January 2023. It faced off brand-new contestants from South Africa and Nigeria.

== Series details ==
| Seasons | Subtitles | Launch date | Finale date | Days | Housemates | Winner | Presenters |
|---|---|---|---|---|---|---|---|
| 1 | None | 25 May 2003 | 7 September 2003 | 106 | 12 | Cherise Makubale | Mark Pilgrim |
| 2 | None | 5 August 2007 | 11 November 2007 | 98 | 12 | Richard Dyle Bezuidenhout | Kabelo Ngakane |
| 3 | None | 24 August 2008 | 23 November 2008 | 91 | 12 | Ricardo Venancio | Kabelo Ngakane |
| 4 | Revolution | 6 September 2009 | 6 December 2009 | 92 | 25 | Kevin Chuwang | IK Osakioduwa |
| 5 | All-Stars | 18 July 2010 | 17 October 2010 | 91 | 14 | Uti Nwachukwu | IK Osakioduwa |
| 6 | Amplified | 1 May 2011 | 31 July 2011 | 91 | 26 | Karen Igho; Wendall Parsons | IK Osakioduwa |
| 7 | StarGame! | 6 May 2012 | 5 August 2012 | 91 | 35 | Keagan Petersen | IK Osakioduwa |
| 8 | The Chase | 26 May 2013 | 25 August 2013 | 91 | 28 | Dillish Matheus | IK Osakioduwa |
| 9 | Hotshots | 5 October 2014 | 6 December 2014 | 63 | 26 | Idris Sultan | IK Osakioduwa |

=== Big Brother Africa 1 ===
The first season of Big Brother Africa, featuring 12 housemates from 12 African countries, premiered to audiences in 42 African countries on Sunday 25 May 2003, and ended on 7 September of the same year, lasting 106 days, making it the longest running season in Big Brother Africa. It was the first time in the world that the internationally famous program will be created using participants of different nationalities from one continent. Mark Pilgrim was the host.

=== Big Brother Africa 2 ===
The second season of Big Brother Africa, featuring 12 housemates from 12 African countries, premiered 5 August 2007, and ended on 11 November of the same year, lasting 98 days. The show returned from its four-year hiatus, with a brand-new host, KB Ngakane.

=== Big Brother Africa 3 ===
The third season of Big Brother Africa, featured 12 housemates from 12 African countries, premiered 24 August 2008, and ended on 23 November of the same year, lasting 91 days. KB returned as host.

=== Big Brother Africa 4: Revolution ===
The fourth season of Big Brother Africa, featured 25 housemates from 14 African countries. The season premiered 6 September 2009, and ended on 6 December of the same year, lasting 91 days. This year, Ikponmwosa "IK" Osakioduwa took over as the new host. It was the first season featuring more than 12 contestants. It was also the first time 14 countries participated.

=== Big Brother Africa 5: All-Stars ===
the fifth season of Big Brother Africa started on 18 July 2010 and ran for 91 days until 17 October 2010. This was an all-star series which featured 14 former Big Brother Africa contestants. For the second time, IK was the host. The winner was Uti Nwachukwu a. k. a uti

=== Big Brother Africa 6: Amplified ===
The sixth season of Big Brother Africa, tagged "Amplified" ran for 91 days from 1 May 2011 to 31 July the same year. Bringing together 26 housemates from 14 African countries, M-Net co-partnered with Coca-Cola for the series. IK returned as host. This season is the first ever series of Big Brother in the world to have 2 winners: Karen Igho from Nigeria and Wendall Robert Parson from Zimbabwe. One of the notable housemates in this season was Zimbabwean actress, model and TV personality, Vimbai Mutinhiri.

=== Big Brother Africa 7: StarGame! ===
The seventh season of Big Brother Africa premiered to viewers in 47 African countries on Sunday 6 May 2012 and ran for 91 days until 5 August 2012. Live performances were made by American rapper J. Cole during the opening ceremony. The show was once again headline sponsored by Coca-Cola and hosted by IK.

This season, the cash prize was raised to US$ 300,000. A new rule called Double-Up was introduced to the show. This means that entrants partnered with other people to enter as a pair.

Liberia and Sierra Leone were represented in the house for the first time ever, while Ethiopia was not represented in this season, and contestants from Mozambique were expected to take on a new role that was not announced, the idea was dropped and replaced with seven celebrity housemates making it a Stargame themed series.

This season featured a record breaker, for the first time ever in the worldwide history of Big Brother, 35 housemates went into the Big Brother house on launch night. From 14 African countries the 35 contestants constituted 14 pairs called BBFs (Big Brother Friends) and seven VIP celebrity housemates.

Keagan Pietersen from South Africa was crowned the winner of the $300 000 cash prize on 5 August 2012 during the 2 hours 20 minutes finale.

=== Big Brother Africa 8: The Chase ===
The eighth season of Big Brother Africa aired in 2013 titled The Chase. M-net's Africa Magic confirmed the return of the series on 18 December 2012. The season premiered Sunday 26 May 2013 with 28 housemates from 14 African countries and lasted for 91 days ending on Sunday 25 August 2013. Ethiopia returned as the fourteenth participating country in the show, replacing Liberia. IK returned as host of the series.

Airtel took over the role of headline sponsor becoming the official sponsor of Big Brother the Chase. Once again 2 houses are featured on BBA The Chase, "Diamond" and "Ruby". Dillish Mathews from Namibia was the winner of the $300 000 cash prize.

=== Big Brother Africa 9: Hot-Shots ===
M-net's Africa Magic announced the ninth season of Africa's top reality TV series on 26 May 2014. The show began with housemates on Sunday 7 September 2014 and ran live for 91 days, 24/7 on Dstv channels 197 and 198, ending with the series finale on 7 December 2014.

The auditions were held in the same 14 countries as the previous season (The Chase) with the only exception being Angola which replaced by newcomers, Rwanda. Although Angola was the only country left out from the original 12 participating countries, it Dstv premiered a local Angolan Portuguese version, Big Brother Angola. Additional auditions were held in Mozambique.

Production of Season 9 had to be put on hold as the Big Brother house in Highlands North, Johannesburg burnt down. Nobody was injured in the fire.

Season 9 premiered on 5 October 2014, nearby the old studio in "7th Street", where the 26 contestants entered the new house for 63 days.

Tanzania's Idris Sultan emerged as the Ultimate Hotshot and the winner of the US$300,000.
