= Warona Setshwaelo =

Botswana actress

- Born: 1976 or 1977 (age 49–50); Gaborone, Botswana
- Education: Virginia Tech
- Occupations: Actress, video editor
- Years active: 2003–present
- Relatives: 1

Warona Masego Setshwaelo (born 1976 or 1977) is a Motswana actress and video editor.

== Biography ==
Setshwaelo was born in Gaborone, Botswana and was raised in Ethiopia, Swaziland, South Africa, and Botswana. Her mother is a psychologist, her father is the politician Ephraim Setshwaelo, and she has a sister, Marang. She developed an interest in activism from a young age. Setshwaelo moved to the United States to study at Virginia Tech, graduating with a degree in Theater Arts. She worked as a video editor and radio host. Setshwaelo did an acting tour with National Players of Olney, Maryland, before deciding to move back to Botswana. She was a housemate in the first season of Big Brother Africa in 2003. Setshwaelo was one of the last housemates to be evicted and she became a celebrity in her home country.

In 2007, Setshwaelo moved to Montreal to further her acting career. She performed in a number of plays in Montreal, including Nutmeg Princess and New Canadian Kid. She had a small role in the 2013 film White House Down. In January and February 2015, Setshwaelo starred in the medical drama The Waiting Room at the Tarragon Theatre in Toronto. In October 2015, she played Odette in the play State of Denial. Setshwaelo played a trauma counselor in a 2016 episode of Quantico. She had a role in the 2018 film On the Basis of Sex. Setshwaelo played Karen, the mother of ex-police officer Lila Hines in the 2019 play Bang Bang.

Her name, Warona, means "ours." In addition to acting, she enjoys cooking and reading. She lives with her partner, Mike Payette, and daughter Khaya.

== Filmography ==
- 2003: Big Brother Africa (TV Series, as herself)
- 2009: Enemy Combatant (Short film, as Amy Dyer)
- 2011: Jack of Diamonds (as Receptionist Kala)
- 2012: Deadfall (as Female Paramedic)
- 2013: White House Down (as School Teacher)
- 2014: 19-2 (TV series, as Depanneur Owner)
- 2014: Northpole (as Jasmine)
- 2016: Quantico (TV Series, as Trauma Counselor)
- 2016: This Life (TV Series, as Registrar Employee)
- 2017: The Disappearance (TV Mini-Series, as Obstetrician)
- 2018: Death Wish (as Nurse Carla)
- 2018: Birthmarked (as TV Talk Show Host)
- 2018: The Death & Life of John F. Donovan (as Mother)
- 2018: The Detectives (as Sylvie Teague)
- 2018: On the Basis of Sex (as Gladys)
- 2019: Deadly Secrets (TV Series, as DeCynda)
- 2020: Transplant (TV Series, as Lavondra Kelly)
- 2023: Avatar: Frontiers of Pandora (video game, as Angela Harding)
