= Big Brother Africa season 2 =

Big Brother Africa
- Season 2
- No. of days: 98
- No. of housemates: 12
- Winner: Richard
- Runner-up: Ofunneka

Season chronology
- ← Previous; Season 1 Next → Season 3

Big Brother Africa 2 was the second series of the reality television show Big Brother Africa, produced by Endemol. The season began airing on 5 August 2007 and ran 98 days ending 11 November 2007.

As with the previous season, the show involved 12 countries within Africa (Angola, Botswana, Ghana, Kenya, Malawi, Namibia, Nigeria, South Africa, Tanzania, Uganda, Zambia and Zimbabwe) each producing a contestant living in an isolated house in Johannesburg, South Africa, while trying to avoid being evicted by viewers and ultimately winning a large cash prize at the end of the show. The show was filmed in a house at Sasani Studios in Lyndhurst, Johannesburg.

== Production ==
=== The House ===
Measuring 280 m^{2}, the Big Brother House was significantly transformed from the first season's House. With a lot more eccentric and bold colours with a fusion of Afro-plush, the House boasted two bedrooms – for the guys and girls – a fully equipped kitchen, a communal bathroom, a dining area, a lounge, a backyard with a Jacuzzi, a Diary Room where Housemates were strongly encouraged to voice their true thoughts and feelings, and a Store Room where most of the Housemates' belongings were kept.

=== Nominations ===
Each week housemates nominate two other housemates for eviction in the Diary Room and must give justified and clear reasons. The Head of House may be nominated for eviction as well. After the nominees are revealed to the House, the current Head of House can save a nominee for eviction including themselves if they are nominated and replace the saved nominee with another nominee. While this is revealed to the viewers, the House does not know of the decision until eviction night Sunday.

=== Head of House ===
The Head of House (or HOH) is a position in the house that gives one housemate each week special privileges over the other Housemates. It is a power similar to both the Head of Household and the Power of Veto used in the American version of Big Brother. During nominations the Head of House can be nominated for eviction by their fellow housemates. Then the Head of House can choose to save a nominee or save themselves from eviction and nominate a new housemate for eviction. While the decision is released to the public, the House will not know of the decision until Sunday, eviction night.

=== Rules and regulations ===
Of contention is also the continued enforcing and later breaking of regulations, such as the imposition of a uniform that was later withdrawn, and subsequent bans against smoking and excessive alcohol consumption that were also later withdrawn with the provision of a shopping list service where the housemates could order whatever they wanted.

=== Product placement ===
The continued interruption of the live broadcast to advertise the show's sponsors has also been questioned.

=== Nomination procedure ===
The change of the nomination procedure to involve a veto by the head of house has also been questioned, especially since the veto could be abused for personal reasons.

== Housemates ==
Name	Real/Full Name	Age	Occupation	Country	Day entered	Day exited	Status
Richard	Richard Dyle Bezuidenhout	25	Student	Tanzania	1	98	Winner
Ofunneka	Ofunneka Malokwu	30	Personal assistant	Nigeria	1	98	Runner-up
Tatiana	Tatiana Durão	26	Actress and model	Angola	1	98	3rd Place
Maureen	Maureen Namatovu	28	Fashion designer	Uganda	1	84	Evicted
Code	Code Sangala	31	Broadcaster	Malawi	1	77	Evicted
Kwaku	Kwaku Asamoah Tutu	30	Self-employed	Ghana	1	70	Evicted
Bertha	Bertha Zakeyo	28	Lawyer	Zimbabwe	1	63	Evicted
Lerato	Lerato Sengadi	25	Events coordinator	South Africa	1	56	Evicted
Maxwell	Maxwell Chongu	26	Call centre operator	Zambia	1	42	Evicted
Meryl	Meryl Shikwambane	21	Receptionist	Namibia	1	35	Evicted
Jeff	Jeff Kariaga	24	Entrepreneur	Kenya	1	28	Evicted
Justice	Justice Motlhabani	23	Freelance journalist and student	Botswana	1	21	Evicted

== Nominations Table ==
A record of the nominations cast, stored in a nominations table, shows how each Housemate nominated other Housemates throughout his or her time in the house. The Head of House can choose to save a nominated Housemate each week and nominate another Housemate to face the public vote. Twists to the normal nominations process are noted, such as immunity from nomination and eviction (referred to as "exempt").

- The Housemate marked in green was the Head of House for that week and was granted the Save and Replace power.

	Week 1	Week 2	Week 3	Week 4	Week 5	Week 6	Week 7	Week 8	Week 9	Week 10	Week 11	Week 12	Week 14 Final		Nominations received
Richard	Lerato, Ofunneka	No; Nominations	Justice, Jeff	Kwaku, Meryl	Meryl, Kwaku	Maxwell, Lerato	Bertha, Lerato	Bertha, Lerato	Bertha, Kwaku	Code, Kwaku	Maureen, Code	Maureen, Ofunneka	Winner (Day 98)		18
Ofunneka	Lerato, Meryl	No; Nominations	Meryl, Lerato	Meryl, Lerato	Lerato, Meryl	Lerato, Kwaku	Bertha, Lerato	Bertha, Lerato	Bertha, Kwaku	Code, Kwaku	Code, Richard	Richard, Tatiana	Runner-up (Day 98)		15
Tatiana	Lerato, Maxwell	No; Nominations	Bertha, Lerato	Maxwell, Lerato	Ofunneka, Lerato	Lerato, Maxwell	Bertha, Lerato	Bertha, Lerato	Bertha, Kwaku	Kwaku, Ofunneka	Maureen, Code	Maureen, Ofunneka	Third place (Day 98)		8
Maureen	Lerato, Kwaku	No; Nominations	Bertha, Meryl	Bertha, Meryl	Meryl, Bertha	Maxwell, Bertha	Bertha, Lerato	Bertha, Lerato	Bertha, Kwaku	Kwaku, Richard	Tatiana, Richard	Ofunneka, Tatiana	Evicted (Day 84)		22
Code	Justice, Maureen	No; Nominations	Justice, Maureen	Jeff, Meryl	Meryl, Tatiana	Richard, Tatiana	Bertha, Lerato	Bertha, Lerato	Bertha, Kwaku	Kwaku, Tatiana	Ofunneka, Richard	Evicted (Day 77)			12
Kwaku	Richard, Justice	No; Nominations	Justice, Ofunneka	Jeff, Ofunneka	Ofunneka, Maureen	Maureen, Richard	Code, Richard	Maureen, Richard	Code, Maureen	Maureen, Richard	Evicted (Day 70)				15
Bertha	Meryl, Justice	No; Nominations	Justice, Jeff	Jeff, Maureen	Meryl, Maureen	Maureen, Richard	Code, Maureen	Code, Maureen	Code, Maureen	Evicted (Day 63)					25
Lerato	Maureen, Ofunneka	No; Nominations	Jeff, Ofunneka	Jeff, Ofunneka	Richard, Tatiana	Richard, Tatiana	Code, Maureen	Code, Maureen	Evicted (Day 56)						24
Maxwell	Meryl; Jeff	No; Nominations	Richard, Meryl	Richard, Meryl	Richard, Kwaku	Richard, Bertha	Evicted (Day 42)								6
Meryl	Ofunneka, Justice	No; Nominations	Jeff, Bertha	Jeff, Maureen	Maureen, Ofunneka	Evicted (Day 35)									19
Jeff	Justice, Maxwell	No; Nominations	Justice, Bertha	Meryl, Lerato	Evicted (Day 28)										10
Justice	Meryl, Bertha	No; Nominations	Meryl, Bertha	Evicted (Day 21)											10
Nomination notes	1	2	3	4	5	6	7	8	9	10	11	12	13		
Head of House	Jeff	Ofunneka	Meryl	Bertha	Maxwell	Lerato	Tatiana	Maureen	Richard	Code	Ofunneka	Tatiana	None		
Nominated (pre-HoH)	Justice, Lerato, Meryl	None	Bertha, Justice	Jeff, Meryl	Maureen, Meryl, Ofunneka	Lerato, Maxwell, Richard	Kwaku, Ofunneka, Tatiana	Bertha, Lerato	Bertha, Kwaku	Code, Kwaku, Richard	Code, Richard	Maureen, Ofunneka, Tatiana	None		
Against public vote	None	None	Jeff, Justice	Jeff, Maureen	Maureen, Meryl, Richard	Maxwell, Richard, Tatiana	Kwaku, Lerato, Ofunneka	Bertha, Lerato	Bertha, Kwaku	Kwaku, Richard, Tatiana	Code, Richard	Maureen, Ofunneka, Tatiana	Ofunneka, Richard, Tatiana		
Evicted	None	None	Justice; 7 of 13 votes to evict	Jeff; 7 of 13 votes to evict	Meryl; 8 of 13 votes to evict	Maxwell; 12 of 13 votes to evict	Kwaku & Ofunneka chosen to fake evict	Lerato; 8 of 13 votes to evict	Bertha; 12 of 13 votes to evict	Kwaku; 11 of 13 votes to evict	Code; 10 of 13 votes to evict	Maureen; 10 of 13 votes to evict	Tatiana; 1 of 13 votes to win	Ofunneka; 5 of 13 votes to win	
Evicted	None	None	Justice; 7 of 13 votes to evict	Jeff; 7 of 13 votes to evict	Meryl; 8 of 13 votes to evict	Maxwell; 12 of 13 votes to evict	Kwaku & Ofunneka chosen to fake evict	Lerato; 8 of 13 votes to evict	Bertha; 12 of 13 votes to evict	Kwaku; 11 of 13 votes to evict	Code; 10 of 13 votes to evict	Maureen; 10 of 13 votes to evict	Richard; 7 of 13 votes to win		

=== Nomination notes ===
- ^Note 1 : On Day 2, Housemates were asked to name 2 others that they would nominate if it were a regular Monday. These nominations did not count and no one was put up for the public vote. If there was a public vote, Justice, Lerato, and Meryl would have been nominated.
- ^Note 2 : There were no nominations or eviction for Week 2.
- ^Note 3 : As Head of House, Meryl chose to remove Bertha from the nominees and replace her with Jeff.
- ^Note 4 : As Head of House, Bertha chose to remove Meryl from the nominees and replace her with Maureen.
- ^Note 5 : As Head of House, Maxwell chose to remove Ofunneka from the nominees and replace her with Richard.
- ^Note 6 : As Head of House, Lerato chose to remove herself from the nominees and replace her with Tatiana.
- ^Note 7 : In Week 7, Big Brother reversed the nomination process by putting up the Housemates with the least nominations. As Head of House, Tatiana chose to remove herself from the nominees and replace her with Lerato. There will be a fake eviction on Sunday, the two fake evicted Housemates will have full access to the happenings in the House. Due to the fake eviction there will be no public voting in Week 7.
- ^Note 8 : As Head of House, Maureen chose to keep the nominations the same. Kwaku and Ofunneka were exempt from being nominated during Week 8.
- ^Note 9 : As Head of House, Richard chose to keep the nominations the same.
- ^Note 10 : Code, the Head of House, chose to save himself and nominate Tatiana in his place.
- ^Note 11 : As Head of House, Ofunneka chose to keep the nominations the same.
- ^Note 12 : As Head of House, Tatiana chose to keep the nominations the same.
- ^Note 13 : This week the public voted to win, rather than to evict.

== Controversy ==
Controversy came up after second runner-up Ofunneka was sexually assaulted by Richard when all the housemates were drunk. The producers of the show deny this, stating it was with Ofunneka's consent, but fellow housemate Maureen screamed for Big Brother's help after she tried to get Richard off Ofunneka. Richard was taken into the diary room while paramedics came in to help the girls. No further comment has been made about the issue, especially as Ofunneka had passed out and remembered nothing of what happened. (In the Australian version of the show, the male housemates who sexually assaulted a female housemate were evicted.)

Newly-wed Richard carried out an affair with Angolan model Tatiana during their stay in the house. This angered Richard's Canadian wife, who threatened him with divorce. Another housemate, Malawian radio DJ Code, managed to seduce all his female housemates. Unknown to him, his Dutch girlfriend, Juna Verheji, was pregnant with his child, and surprised him by showing up at his eviction. Richard and Code were eventually forgiven by their respective partners.

Producers were unable to deal with other issues which included bullying by South African Lerato Sengadi. Indecent sexual acts by Namibian housemate Meryl and Ghanaian Kweku were another talking point, although Meryl denies the couple had sex. The show has been the subject of much criticism, especially from the fact that most of the items in the house are not "African" and therefore it is not really Big Brother Africa, but essentially just a Big Brother-style show with African contestants.

At the end of its run, Big Brother Africa 2 was criticized for not showing any positive values to young people all over the continent.
