= Uti Nwachukwu =

Nigerian actor

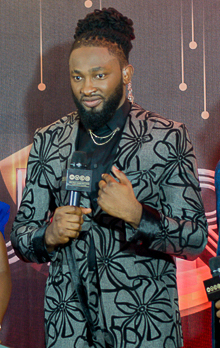
- Born: Uti Nwachukwu Emeka; 3 August 1982 (age 44)
- Education: Benson Idahosa University University of Nigeria, Nsukka
- Occupations: Television personality, actor
- Known for: Winner of Big Brother Africa 5
- Awards: 2012 GIAMA "Best New Actor"

Uti Nwachukwu (born 3 August 1982) is a Nigerian television personality and actor. He gained prominence as the winner of Big Brother Africa: All-Stars and as co-host of Jara.

== Early life ==
Nwachukwu is from Aboh, Ndokwa East Local Government Area, Delta State, Nigeria. He is the youngest of six children. He was raised in Ughelli, Delta State. From 1993 to 1999, he attended Igbenedion Education Centre. He later studied computer science, obtaining a diploma from the University of Nigeria, Nsukka and a bachelor's degree from Benson Idahosa University.

== Career ==
Nwachukwu represented Nigeria in Big Brother Africa 3. He was the third housemate evicted on 5 October 2008 (day 42).

In 2010, he returned as a contestant in Big Brother Africa 5: All-Stars, where he spent 91 days in the house and ultimately won, defeating Munya Chidzonga in the final vote by 8 to 7. He spent a combined total of 133 days in the Big Brother house.

He has worked as a red carpet and television host. He has hosted the Africa Magic Viewers' Choice Awards, for several years, as well as, the magazine show Jara, which ran for 11 seasons on Africa Magic. In 2022, he hosted the red carpet of the eighth edition of Africa Magic Viewers' Choice Awards, the reunion of Showmax reality show The Real Housewives of Lagos and the launch event of Tecno Camon 19.

== Acting career ==
In 2011, Nwachukwu released his debut single, "Once in My Life". The music video was filmed in May 2011 and premiered later that year. He then transitioned from music to acting, appearing in several Nollywood films, including The Changer, Finding Mercy, Nnenda, In the Cupboard, Broken Silence, Weekend Getaway, and Deep Inside.

== Filmography ==
- The Changer (2015) as Femi Martins
- Finding Mercy (2013) as Rogers
- Bursting Out (film) (2010) as Ebuka
- Nnenda (2009)
- In the Cupboard (2012) as Jenkins
- Broken Silence (2012) as Gerald
- Weekend Getaway (2012) as Mahadi Bello
- Blind Stranger (2022) as Simba
- Whose Meal Ticket (2017) as Kehinde Disu
- Aki and Pawpaw (2021) as Panshak
- Love Is in the Hair (2016)
- Chief Daddy (2018) as Dare Edwards
- 10 Days in Sun City (2017) as Pageant presenter

== Awards ==
- GIAMA Awards, Best New Actor (2012, held in the United States)
- Mode Men Awards, TV Personality of the Year (2012)
- Nigerian Music Awards, Best Soft Rock/Alternative Video (2021)
- Nollywood Movie Awards, Best Rising Star (Male)
- African Movie Academy Awards, Best Supporting Actor (2016)
- Nigerian Broadcaster Awards, African Broadcaster (2014, 2016)

== See also ==
- List of Igbo people
- List of Nigerian media personalities
