= Big Brother Africa season 4 =

Big Brother Africa
- Season 4
- No. of days: 91
- No. of housemates: 25
- Winner: Kevin
- Runner-up: Emma

Season chronology
- ← Previous; Season 3 Next → Season 5

Big Brother Africa 4 (also known as Big Brother Africa: Revolution) was the fourth series of the Big Brother Africa reality television series produced by Endemol. The series began airing on September 6, 2009, and aired for 92 days, ending on December 6, 2009, on M-Net. Nigerian television star IK Osakioduwa was the new host for the series. The grand prize fund this year is $200,000.

== Format ==
This year's format has changed from past seasons. Some of the changes are:

- Housemates are now allowed to freely discuss nominations.
- The public will vote to save, not voting to evict. However, some weeks have included the public voting to evict instead of to save.
- The winner receives $200,000.

There has been numerous twists in this year's series.

- On Day 1, twelve all-male housemates entered the House, with no female housemates entered.
- One housemate, Edward, has a twin brother, Erastus, who are both part of the twin twist. Every few days, Edward and Erastus will switch places. Their mission is to keep secret that they have switched places. If they both successfully do this for two weeks, they will play individually. Three people are allowed to find out, but if four people find out, they will play as one housemate. They were successful, and allowed to play as individuals. Erastus became the seventh person to be evicted from the House on Day 28.
- For the first time, on Day 7, two housemates, Teddy and Wayoe, became evicted as part of a double eviction.
- After the double eviction, twelve all-female housemates entered a house next door, without the male housemates knowing. The female housemates spied on the male housemates for one week, before entering the main house.
- For the first time, on Day 28, three housemates, Erastus, Rene, and Paloma became evicted as part of a triple eviction.
- On Day 28, it was announced that all remaining housemates would no longer be competing individually, but in pairs. The pairs will play the game as one. If one member is nominated, both are nominated. If one is saved by the Head of House, both are safe. If one is evicted, then both are evicted. Although, diary sessions can be still individual. The pairs were:
  - Jeremy and Geraldine
  - Edward and Emma
  - Kaone and Liz
  - Itai and Nkenna
  - Hannington and Yacob
  - Quinn and Kristal
  - Mzamo and Leonel
  - Kevin and Elizabeth
- On Day 49, the pairs were dismantled and the housemates were, again, playing as individuals.

== Housemates ==
A total of 25 housemates entered the House, an increase than previous series. Fourteen countries; Angola, Botswana, Ethiopia, Ghana, Malawi, Mozambique, Namibia, Nigeria, Kenya, South Africa, Uganda, Tanzania, Zambia and Zimbabwe participated in this year's series. On Day 0, twelve male housemates entered the House. During week one, Edward's twin, Erastus, switched places with each other. They will switch on and off in the first two weeks. On Day 7, twelve female housemates entered a secret House next door. On Day 14, Edward and Erastus was revealed to the male housemates as twins, and from now on will play as individuals.

| Name | Real/Full Name | Age | Occupation | Country | Day entered | Day exited | Status |
|---|---|---|---|---|---|---|---|
| Kevin | Kevin Chuwang Pam | 27 | Entertainer | Nigeria | 1 | 91 | Winner |
| Emma | Maria Baptista da Rocha | 24 | Student | Angola | 7 | 91 | Runner-up |
| Edward | Edward Moongo | 33 | Public Relations Officer | Namibia | 1 | 91 | Third Place |
| Mzamo | Mzamose Chibambo | 24 | Personal Assistant | Malawi | 7 | 91 | Fourth Place |
| Nkenna | Nkenna Iwuagwu | 23 | Student | Nigeria | 7 | 91 | Fifth Place |
| Itai | Itai Makumbe | 31 | Student | Zimbabwe | 1 | 84 | Evicted |
| Geraldine | Geraldine Iheme | 24 | Student | Nigeria | 7 | 77 | Evicted |
| Leonel | Leonel Estevoa | 23 | IT Administrator | Mozambique | 1 | 70 | Evicted |
| Elizabeth | Elizabeth Gupta | 21 | Television Presenter and Actress | Tanzania | 7 | 63 | Evicted |
| Jeremy | Jeremy Ndirangu | 22 | Student and Auditor | Kenya | 1 | 56 | Evicted |
| Kristal | Kristal Culverwell | 26 | Ambulance Technician | Zimbabwe | 7 | 49 | Evicted |
| Quinn | Quinn Seiber | 21 | Student | South Africa | 1 | 49 | Evicted |
| Kaone | Kaone Ramontshonyana | 26 | Intern Principal Youth Officer | Botswana | 1 | 42 | Evicted |
| Liz | Liziwe Coka | 22 | Business Co-Ordinator | South Africa | 7 | 42 | Evicted |
| Hannington | Hannington Kuteesa | 23 | Business Owner | Uganda | 1 | 35 | Evicted |
| Yacob | Yacob Yehdego | 28 | Assistant manager | Ethiopia | 1 | 35 | Evicted |
| Paloma | Paloma Manda | 25 | Sales Assistant | Zambia | 7 | 28 | Evicted |
| Rene | Rene Moolman | 26 | Hairstylist | Namibia | 7 | 28 | Evicted |
| Erastus | Erastus Moongo | 33 | Business Owner | Namibia | 1 | 28 | Evicted |
| Phil | Filbert Okure | 25 | Marketing Consultant | Uganda | 1 | 21 | Evicted |
| Jennifer | Jennifer Mussanhane | 22 | Graduate | Mozambique | 7 | 21 | Walked |
| Maggie | Margaret Mungalu | 23 | Student and Model | Zambia | 7 | 14 | Evicted |
| Edna | Edna Alfredo | 27 | Graduate | Angola | 7 | 14 | Evicted |
| Wayoe | George Wayoe | 34 | Web Developer | Ghana | 1 | 7 | Evicted |
| Teddy | Edward Muthusi | 34 | Advertising Copywriter, Voice-Over Artist and Broadcaster | Kenya | 1 | 7 | Evicted |

== Nominations table ==
Each week the housemates must nominate two of their fellow housemates for eviction. Each week the HoH must choose to save one of the initial evictees and replace them with another housemate. In weeks when more than two housemates are nominated for eviction the voting results to save are revealed as evict votes which go to housemates who received the fewest votes in a country or countries. Any changes that affect nominations are noted.

| | Week 1 | Week 2 | Week 3 | Week 4 | Week 5 | Week 6 | Week 7 | Week 8 | Week 9 | Week 10 | Week 11 | Week 12 | Week 13 Final | | Nominations received |
|---|---|---|---|---|---|---|---|---|---|---|---|---|---|---|---|
| Kevin | Kaone, Edward | Hannington, Edward | Phil, Edward | Rene, Edward | Kristal, Hannington | Edward, Liz | Mzamo, Kristal | Leonel, Mzamo | Mzamo, Nkenna | Mzamo, Edward | Edward, Mzamo | Mzamo, Edward | Winner (Day 91) | | 3 |
| Emma | Not in House | Nkenna, Geraldine | Edward, Erastus | Rene, Edward | Hannington, Kristal | Itai, Liz | Quinn, Itai | Itai, Mzamo | Nkenna, Mzamo | Nkenna, Geraldine | Nkenna, Mzamo | Edward, Mzamo | Runner-up (Day 91) | | 19 |
| Edward | Itai, Jeremy | Jeremy, Leonel | Quinn, Jeremy | Paloma, Liz | Liz, Nkenna | Itai, Liz | Itai, Quinn | Itai, Jeremy | Emma, Elizabeth | Itai, Leonel | Emma, Itai | Emma, Itai | Third place (Day 91) | | 42 |
| Mzamo | Not in House | Geraldine, Edna | Erastus, Hannington | Paloma, Liz | Jeremy, Liz | Quinn, Liz | Jeremy, Elizabeth | Jeremy, Elizabeth | Elizabeth, Emma | Itai, Leonel | Itai, Emma | Itai, Emma | Fourth place (Day 91) | | 24 |
| Nkenna | Not in House | Emma, Kristal | Edward, Erastus | Paloma, Liz | Yacob, Quinn | Quinn, Kaone | Leonel, Edward | Jeremy, Emma | Emma, Edward | Itai, Leonel | Itai, Emma | Itai, Emma | Fifth place (Day 91) | | 13 |
| Itai | Phil, Kaone | Hannington, Edward | Edward, Erastus | Liz, Paloma | Elizabeth, Mzamo | Quinn, Kaone | Edward, Leonel | Jeremy, Mzamo | Emma, Mzamo | Leonel, Emma | Emma, Geraldine | Nkenna, Mzamo | Evicted (Day 84) | | 26 |
| Geraldine | Not in House | Maggie, Kristal | Kristal, Edward | Hannington, Rene | Kristal, Yacob | Liz, Quinn | Quinn, Leonel | Nkenna, Mzamo | Edward, Mzamo | Itai, Leonel | Itai, Emma | Evicted (Day 77) | | | 9 |
| Leonel | Hannington, Edward | Jeremy, Hannington | Phil, Edward | Rene, Edward | Hannington, Kristal | Liz, Kristal | Nkenna, Quinn | Elizabeth, Jeremy | Nkenna, Mzamo | Geraldine, Nkenna | Evicted (Day 70) | | | | 18 |
| Elizabeth | Not in House | Emma, Geraldine | Edward, Kaone | Hannington, Rene | Hannington, Kristal | Itai, Liz | Quinn, Leonel | Itai, Mzamo | Mzamo, Nkenna | Evicted (Day 63) | | | | | 6 |
| Jeremy | Edward, Hannington | Hannington, Edward | Phil, Edward | Rene, Edward | Kristal, Yacob | Liz, Mzamo | Itai, Mzamo | Itai, Mzamo | Evicted (Day 56) | | | | | | 24 |
| Kristal | Not in House | Paloma, Maggie | Emma, Leonel | Hannington, Rene | Hannington, Edward | Jeremy, Edward | Jeremy, Leonel | Evicted (Day 49) | | | | | | | 16 |
| Quinn | Yacob, Hannington | Hannington, Edward | Phil, Edward | Rene, Edward | Hannington, Emma | Liz, Itai | Itai, Mzamo | Evicted (Day 49) | | | | | | | 14 |
| Kaone | Kevin, Hannington | Phil, Yacob | Edward, Phil | Rene, Edward | Hannington, Kristal | Kristal, Kevin | Evicted (Day 42) | | | | | | | | 8 |
| Liz | Not in House | Rene, Maggie | Edward, Erastus | Rene, Edward | Yacob, Kristal | Geraldine, Nkenna | Evicted (Day 42) | | | | | | | | 22 |
| Hannington | Kaone, Edward | Jeremy, Leonel | Jeremy, Quinn | Paloma, Liz | Jeremy, Liz | Evicted (Day 35) | | | | | | | | | 21 |
| Yacob | Edward, Kaone | Jeremy, Leonel | Jeremy, Quinn | Paloma, Liz | Liz, Jeremy | Evicted (Day 35) | | | | | | | | | 6 |
| Paloma | Not in House | Kristal, Emma | Edward, Erastus | Rene, Edward | Evicted (Day 28) | | | | | | | | | | 9 |
| Rene | Not in House | Kristal, Liz | Leonel, Jennifer | Paloma, Liz | Evicted (Day 28) | | | | | | | | | | 13 |
| Erastus | Itai, Jeremy | Jeremy, Leonel | Jeremy, Lionel | Paloma, Liz | Evicted (Day 28) | | | | | | | | | | 17 |
| Jennifer | Not in House | Nkenna, Rene | Edward, Erastus | Walked (Day 21) | | | | | | | | | | | 1 |
| Phil | Edward, Kaone | Jeremy, Leonel | Jeremy, Quinn | Evicted (Day 21) | | | | | | | | | | | 8 |
| Edna | Not in House | Mzamo, Geraldine | Evicted (Day 14) | | | | | | | | | | | | 2 |
| Maggie | Not in House | Geraldine, Edna | Evicted (Day 14) | | | | | | | | | | | | 3 |
| Wayoe | Phil, Hannington | Evicted (Day 7) | | | | | | | | | | | | | 0 |
| Teddy | Kevin, Itai | Evicted (Day 7) | | | | | | | | | | | | | 0 |
| Nomination note | 1 | 2 | 3 | 4 | 5 | 6 | 7 | 8 | 9 | 10 | 11 | 12 | 13 | | |
| Head of House | none | | Kevin | Elizabeth | Itai | Quinn | Leonel | Nkenna | Edward | Edward | Itai | Edward | none | | |
| Nominated (pre-HoH) | none | | Edward, Erastus | Edward, Liz, Paloma, Rene | Hannington & Yacob, Kristal & Quinn | Kaone & Liz, Kristal & Quinn | Leonel & Mzamo, Kristal & Quinn | Itai, Jeremy, Mzamo | Emma, Mzamo, Nkenna | Itai, Leonel | Emma, Itai | Emma, Itai, Mzamo | none | | |
| Saved | none | | Edward | Liz | Kristal & Quinn | Kristal & Quinn | Leonel & Mzamo | Itai | Mzamo | Itai | Itai | Mzamo | none | | |
| Against public vote | All housemates | All housemates | Erastus, Phil | Edward, Erastus, Paloma, Rene | Elizabeth & Kevin, Hannington & Yacob | Edward & Emma, Kaone & Liz | Elizabeth & Kevin, Kristal & Quinn | Emma, Jeremy, Mzamo | Elizabeth, Emma, Nkenna | Kevin, Leonel | Emma, Geraldine | Emma, Itai, Kevin | Edward, Emma, Kevin, Mzamo, Nkenna | | |
| Walked | none | | | Jennifer | none | | | | | | | | | | |
| Evicted | Teddy; Most points to evict | Edna; Most points to evict | Phil; 11 of 15 votes to evict | Erastus; 7 of 15 votes to evict | Hannington & Yacob; 5 of 15 votes to save | Kaone & Liz; 4 of 15 votes to save | Kristal & Quinn; 5 of 15 votes to save | Jeremy; 9 of 15 votes to evict | Elizabeth; 8 of 15 votes to evict | Leonel; 11 of 15 votes to evict | Geraldine; 11 of 15 votes to evict | Itai; 7 of 15 votes to evict | Nkenna; 0 of 15 votes to win | Mzamo; 1 of 15 votes to win | |
| Evicted | Teddy; Most points to evict | Edna; Most points to evict | Phil; 11 of 15 votes to evict | Rene; 6 of 15 votes to evict | Hannington & Yacob; 5 of 15 votes to save | Kaone & Liz; 4 of 15 votes to save | Kristal & Quinn; 5 of 15 votes to save | Jeremy; 9 of 15 votes to evict | Elizabeth; 8 of 15 votes to evict | Leonel; 11 of 15 votes to evict | Geraldine; 11 of 15 votes to evict | Itai; 7 of 15 votes to evict | Edward; 1 of 15 votes to win | Emma; 2 of 15 votes to win | |
| Evicted | Wayoe; Most points to evict | Maggie; Most points to evict | Phil; 11 of 15 votes to evict | Rene; 6 of 15 votes to evict | Hannington & Yacob; 5 of 15 votes to save | Kaone & Liz; 4 of 15 votes to save | Kristal & Quinn; 5 of 15 votes to save | Jeremy; 9 of 15 votes to evict | Elizabeth; 8 of 15 votes to evict | Leonel; 11 of 15 votes to evict | Geraldine; 11 of 15 votes to evict | Itai; 7 of 15 votes to evict | Edward; 1 of 15 votes to win | Emma; 2 of 15 votes to win | |
| Evicted | Wayoe; Most points to evict | Maggie; Most points to evict | Phil; 11 of 15 votes to evict | Paloma; 2 of 15 votes to evict | Hannington & Yacob; 5 of 15 votes to save | Kaone & Liz; 4 of 15 votes to save | Kristal & Quinn; 5 of 15 votes to save | Jeremy; 9 of 15 votes to evict | Elizabeth; 8 of 15 votes to evict | Leonel; 11 of 15 votes to evict | Geraldine; 11 of 15 votes to evict | Itai; 7 of 15 votes to evict | Kevin; 11 of 15 votes to win | | |

=== Nomination notes ===
- ^Note 1 : In Week 1, all Housemates were asked to nominate two housemates for eviction. What the Housemates did not know was that these nominations were fake and all of the Housemates had automatically been nominated for eviction. As Edward & Erastus were on a secret mission, acting as 1 Housemate, the other Housemates knew them collectively as "Edward".
- ^Note 2 : In Week 2, twelve female Housemates entered a secret House next door to the real Big Brother House. The male Housemates are unaware of this, so male Housemates nominated males. The females nominated female Housemates only. Similar to Week 1, nominations were fake, and all-female Housemates had automatically been nominated for eviction, with the male Housemates left exempt from eviction.
- ^Note 3 : In Week 3, Head of House Kevin chose to save Edward from eviction and nominated Phil in his place.
- ^Note 4 : In Week 4, Head of House Elizabeth chose to save Liz from eviction and nominated Erastus in her place.
- ^Note 5 : In Weeks 5 through 7, all Housemates were paired up with another Housemate. However, Housemates will still nominate individually. The two pairs with the highest number of combined nominations will face the public vote. Pairs are denoted by the colored cells to the left of the Housemates' names. Head of House Itai chose to save Kristal and Quinn from eviction and nominated Elizabeth and Kevin in their place.
- ^ Note 6 : In Week 6, Head of House Quinn chose to save himself and Kristal from eviction and nominated Edward and Emma in their place.
- ^Note 7 : In Week 7, Head of House Leonel chose to save himself and Mzamo from eviction and nominated Elizabeth and Kevin in their place.
- ^Note 8 : In Week 8, all remaining pairs were broken and Housemates were told they would, again, be competing as individuals. Head of House Nkenna chose to save Itai from eviction and nominated Emma in his place.
- ^Note 9 : In Week 9, Head of House Edward chose to save Mzamo from eviction and nominated Elizabeth in her place.
- ^Note 10 : In Week 10, Head of House Edward chose to save Itai from eviction and nominated Kevin in his place.
- ^Note 11 : In Week 11, Head of House Itai chose to save himself from eviction and nominated Geraldine in his place.
- ^Note 12 : In Week 12, Head of House Edward chose to save Mzamo from eviction and nominated Kevin in her place.
- ^Note 13 : For the final voting results, it was decided that the winner would be the housemate who received the most win votes.

== Controversy ==
Many fans were not happy about the inequality of number of housemates per representing country. They were emphasizing on how some countries had three participants (e.g. Namibia, Nigeria) while other countries simply had one participant (e.g. Botswana, Ethiopia, Malawi, Tanzania, Ghana - whose only participant was evicted on the first week on the show). The fans complained about the issue to M-Net after how unfair the balance of the game was.
