= Big Brother (Finnish TV series) season 10 =

Big Brother
- Season 10
- Presented by: Mari Sainio
- No. of days: 83
- No. of housemates: 21
- Winner: Andte Gaup-Juuso
- Runner-up: Anna Ala-Salomäki
- Companion shows: Big Brother Talk Show; Big Brother Extra

Release
- Original network: Sub
- Original release: 24 August – 14 November 2014

Season chronology
- ← Previous; Julkkis Big Brother 2013 Next → Big Brother 2019

The tenth season of Big Brother Suomi premiered on 24 August 2014 and was screened on Sub. Mari Sainio continued as the main host for the program, known as Big Brother Talk Show, while Sauli Koskinen hosted the companion show Big Brother Extra. The previous season saw celebrities as contestants while this edition reverted to casting civilians as contestants. The contestants, also known as Housemates, lived inside the Big Brother House with the goal to be the last housemate and win €100,000. The program concluded on 14 November 2014 where Andte Gaup-Juuso was crowned the winner with 65.39% of the public vote to win. Big Brother Suomi went on a five-year hiatus after the conclusion of this season before being revived for an eleventh season that premiered on 1 September 2019 on Jim and Nelonen.

== Housemates ==
Name	Age	Hometown	Occupation	Day entered	Day exited	Status
Andte Gaup-Juuso	23	Enontekiö	Reindeer herder	1	83	Winner
Anna Ala-Salomäki	20	Helsinki	Office assistant	1	83	Runner-up
Joonas Ranta	19	Oulainen	ICT undergraduate	1	83	3rd Place
Jenna Mäkikyrö	19	Ylitornio	Hairdressing student	1	83	4th Place
Jonathan Silfver	33	Helsinki	Horse rider	1	83	5th Place
Pertti Mäenpää	54	Pori	Fireward / Member of a city council	43	83	6th Place
Jussi 'K' Karttunen	22	Helsinki	Salesman	43	83	7th Place
Tuija Vähämäki	25	Ypäjä	Practical nurse	1	83	8th Place
Tuulikki Timgren-Lillukkamäki	68	Lohja	Entrepreneur/Textile artist	1	78	Evicted
Leyla Väänänen	22	Helsinki		18	78	Evicted
Armi Mattila	52	Helsinki	Entrepreneur	1	78	Evicted
Dani Öini	24	Helsinki		1	71	Evicted
Joni Hesselgren	18	Vantaa	Unemployed	1	64	Evicted
Jonna Tuominen	24	Jyväskylä	Student	1	57	Evicted
Jarno Pouhula	25	Lapua	Karaoke host/DJ & Bartender	1	50	Evicted
Nimo Samatar	19	Espoo	Practical nurse	1	43	Evicted
Janne Mikkonen	40	Helsinki	Salesman	18	36	Evicted
Markku Timgren-Martin	36	Forssa		1	29	Evicted
Jussi Kettunen	27	Kemi	Executive director	1	22	Evicted
Anne Vieri	50	Seinäjoki	Hospital care	1	15	Evicted
Tommy Fagerholm	59	Ingå	Matriculation	1	7	Ejected

== Groups ==
This year housemates were divided into two groups when they entered the house. There is a fence separating Basement and Mansion groups, and weekly tasks are competition against basement and mansion.

The Stone Quarry was a penalty area. The Stone quarry group was totally separated from other housemates, and they lived in the open air.

The group Operation Autumn Storm is a group of volunteered housemates. They can earn two weeks of immunity against evictions, but they have hardened rules. 1st rule violation means a warning, 2nd violation brings him/her up for eviction and 3rd rule violation means instant ejection.

- On the launch night, housemates were divided into two houses: the Basement and the Mansion.
- On Day 2, two housemates, Jarno and Jussi, switched houses.
- On Day 8, Joonas needed to decide one switch from Mansion to Basement. He chooses Joni (was not able to choose himself).
- On Day 14, Basement won the weekly task, and they wanted to change sides.
- On Day 18, Jonathan got a "penalty" and switched houses.
- On Day 22, Basement won weekly task again, and they wanted to change sides.
- On Day 23, two housemates, Nimo and Janne, switched houses.
- On Day 29, Basement won and all changed sides.
- On Day 33, Janne and Dani changed sides
- On Day 36, Basement won and all changed sides.
- On Day 38, the Penalty area "stone quarry" was introduced. Jenna, Nimo and Jarno to quarry.
- On Day 39, Dani must order someone to quarry, he chose Andte.
- On Day 40, Big Brother rearranged teams.
- On Day 43, Jenna got removed from Quarry and moved back to the house. Quickly after this, there was an announcement that the basement won the weekly task, so they wanted to change sides.
- On Day 44, Andte and Jarno returned from the quarry.
- On Day 46, two new housemates, Pertti and Jussi K.
- On Day 58, Basement and Mansion separation ended.
- On Day 59, Jonathan, Pertti, Andte and Tuulikki started Operation Autumn Storm.
- On Day 60, Tuulikki got removed from Autumn Storm for health reasons and got back to the House.
- On Day 64, Operation Autumn Storm ended.

Housemate	Day 1	Day 2	Day 8	Day 15	Day 18	Day 22	Day 23	Day 29	Day 33	Day 36	Day 38	Day 39	Day 40	Day 43	Day 44	Day 46	Day 50	Day 58	Day 59	Day 60	Day 64
Andte	Mansion	Mansion	Mansion	Basement	Basement	Mansion	Mansion	Basement	Basement	Mansion	Mansion	Quarry	Quarry	Quarry	Basement	Basement	Basement	House	Storm	Storm	House
Anna	Basement	Basement	Basement	Mansion	Mansion	Basement	Basement	Mansion	Mansion	Basement	Basement	Basement	Mansion	Basement	Basement	Basement	Basement	House	House	House	House
Armi	Basement	Basement	Basement	Mansion	Mansion	Basement	Basement	Mansion	Mansion	Basement	Basement	Basement	Mansion	Basement	Basement	Basement	Basement	House	House	House	House
Dani	Mansion	Mansion	Mansion	Basement	Basement	Mansion	Mansion	Basement	Mansion	Basement	Basement	Basement	Mansion	Basement	Basement	Basement	Basement	House	House	House	House
Jenna	Mansion	Mansion	Mansion	Basement	Basement	Mansion	Mansion	Basement	Basement	Mansion	Quarry	Quarry	Quarry	Mansion	Mansion	Mansion	Mansion	House	House	House	House
Jonathan	Mansion	Mansion	Mansion	Basement	Mansion	Basement	Basement	Mansion	Mansion	Basement	Basement	Basement	Mansion	Basement	Basement	Basement	Basement	House	Storm	Storm	House
Joonas	Mansion	Mansion	Mansion	Basement	Basement	Mansion	Mansion	Basement	Basement	Mansion	Mansion	Mansion	Basement	Mansion	Mansion	Mansion	Mansion	House	House	House	House
Jussi K																Mansion	Mansion	House	House	House	House
Leyla					Basement	Mansion	Mansion	Basement	Basement	Mansion	Mansion	Mansion	Basement	Mansion	Mansion	Mansion	Mansion	House	House	House	House
Pertti																Basement	Basement	House	Storm	Storm	House
Tuija	Basement	Basement	Basement	Mansion	Mansion	Basement	Basement	Mansion	Mansion	Basement	Basement	Basement	Basement	Mansion	Mansion	Mansion	Mansion	House	House	House	House
Tuulikki	Basement	Basement	Basement	Mansion	Mansion	Basement	Basement	Mansion	Mansion	Basement	Basement	Basement	Basement	Mansion	Mansion	Mansion	Mansion	House	Storm	House	House
Joni	Mansion	Mansion	Basement	Mansion	Mansion	Basement	Basement	Mansion	Mansion	Basement	Basement	Basement	Basement	Mansion	Mansion	Mansion	Mansion	House	House	House	
Jonna	Basement	Basement	Basement	Mansion	Mansion	Basement	Basement	Mansion	Mansion	Basement	Basement	Basement	Mansion	Basement	Basement	Basement	Basement				
Jarno	Basement	Mansion	Mansion	Basement	Basement	Mansion	Mansion	Basement	Basement	Mansion	Quarry	Quarry	Quarry	Quarry	Mansion	Mansion					
Nimo	Basement	Basement	Basement	Mansion	Mansion	Basement	Mansion	Basement	Basement	Mansion	Quarry	Quarry	Quarry								
Janne					Basement	Mansion	Basement	Mansion	Basement												
Markku	Mansion	Mansion	Mansion	Basement	Basement	Mansion	Mansion														
Jussi	Mansion	Basement	Basement	Mansion	Mansion																
Anne	Mansion	Mansion	Mansion																		
Tommy	Basement	Basement																			

== Nominations table ==
The first housemate in each box was nominated for two points, and the second housemate was nominated for one point.

	Week 2	Week 3	Week 4	Week 5	Week 6	Week 7	Week 8	Week 9	Week 10	Week 11	Week 12 Final	
Andte	Anne; Armi	Armi; Jussi	Jonathan; Armi	Jonathan; Tuulikki	Jonathan; Jonna	Jonathan; Armi	No; Nominations	Save	Save	Armi; Jonathan	Winner (Day 83)	
Anna	Jarno; Tuulikki	Markku; Tuulikki	Markku; Tuulikki	Tuulikki; Dani	Dani; Tuulikki	Tuulikki; Andte	Nominated	No; Nominations	No; Nominations	Andte; Jussi K	Runner-Up (Day 83)	
Joonas	Tuulikki; Armi	Armi; Tuulikki	Armi; Tuulikki	Armi; Tuulikki	Joni; Jonathan	Jonathan; Armi	No; Nominations	Nominated	No; Nominations	Jenna; Jonathan	Third place (Day 83)	
Jenna	Markku; Anne	Markku; Armi	Jarno; Markku	Janne; Jarno	In the Quarry	Jarno; Tuulikki	No; Nominations	No; Nominations	No; Nominations	Joonas; Jussi K	Fourth place (Day 83)	
Jonathan	Joni; Jarno	Armi; Jussi	Markku; Leyla	Jarno; Leyla	Andte; Jarno	Joonas; Jarno	No; Nominations	Save	Save	Jussi K Pertti	Fifth place (Day 83)	
Pertti	Not in House					Jonathan (3); Joni (2)	No; Nominations	Save	Save	Jonathan; Jenna	Sixth place (Day 83)	
Jussi K	Not in House					Jonathan (3); Dani (2)	No; Nominations	Nominated	No; Nominations	Jenna; Jonathan	Seventh place (Day 83)	
Tuija	Jussi; Anne	Jussi; Tuulikki	Tuulikki; Leyla	Tuulikki; Jarno	Jarno; Tuulikki	Jarno; Tuulikki	No; Nominations	No; Nominations	Nominated	Leyla; Jussi K	Eighth place (Day 83)	
Armi	Anne; Markku	Jussi; Markku	Leyla; Markku	Jarno; Leyla	Jarno; Leyla	Jarno; Leyla	Nominated	No; Nominations	Save	Andte; Leyla	Evicted (Day 78)	
Leyla	Not in House	Exempt	Janne; Jonna	Janne; Tuulikki	Jonathan; Jarno	Jonathan; Tuulikki	No; Nominations	No; Nominations	No; Nominations	Tuulikki; Armi	Evicted (Day 78)	
Tuulikki	Jussi; Jenna	Jussi; Jonathan	Armi; Joni	Joni; Anna	Anna; Joni	Armi; Leyla	No; Nominations	No; Nominations	No; Nominations	Leyla; Jenna	Evicted (Day 78)	
Dani	Anne; Jussi	Armi; Markku	Joni; Tuulikki	Janne; Anna	Joni; Jonathan	Tuija; Armi	No; Nominations	Nominated	Nominated	Evicted (Day 71)		
Joni	Joonas; Anne	Tuulikki; Joonas	Markku; Tuulikki	Jonathan; Tuulikki	Tuulikki; Jonathan	Tuulikki; Jonathan	No; Nominations	Nominated	Evicted (Day 64)			
Jonna	Jarno; Anne	Jussi; Nimo	Tuulikki; Nimo	Jarno; Tuulikki	Jarno; Tuulikki	Jarno; Tuulikki	Nominated	Evicted (Day 57)				
Jarno	Tuulikki; Nimo	Jenna; Armi	Jonathan; Armi	Jonathan; Tuulikki	In the Quarry	Jonna; Jonathan	Evicted (Day 50)					
Nimo	Jussi; Anne	Jussi; Armi	Jonathan; Joonas	Jonathan; Armi	In the Quarry	Evicted (Day 43)						
Janne	Not in House	Exempt	Joni; Nimo	Nimo; Leyla	Evicted (Day 36)							
Markku	Joni; Jenna	Jenna; Armi	Jonathan; Armi	Evicted (Day 29)								
Jussi	Tuulikki; Anne	Tuulikki; Markku	Evicted (Day 22)									
Anne	Jussi; Tuija	Evicted (Day 15)										
Tommy	Ejected (Day 7)											
Notes	1	2	none		3,4	5	6	6,7,8,9	7,9	10	11	
Up for eviction	All; Housemates	Armi; Jussi; Markku; Tuulikki	Armi; Jonathan; Markku; Tuulikki	Janne; Jarno; Jonathan; Tuulikki	Jarno; Jonathan; Joni; Nimo; Tuulikki	Armi; Jarno; Jonathan; Tuulikki	Anna; Armi; Jonna	Dani; Joni; Joonas; Jussi K	Dani; Tuija	All; Housemates		
Ejected	Tommy	none										
Evicted	Anne; 4.42% to save	Jussi; 23.76% to save	Markku; 22.28% to save	Janne; 21.12% to save	Nimo; 17.96% to save	Jarno; 24.14% to save	Jonna; 28.55% to save	Joni; 24.29% to save	Dani; 42.79% to save	Tuulikki; 8.79% to save	Tuija; 0.75% to win	Jussi K 1.2% to win
Evicted	Anne; 4.42% to save	Jussi; 23.76% to save	Markku; 22.28% to save	Janne; 21.12% to save	Nimo; 17.96% to save	Jarno; 24.14% to save	Jonna; 28.55% to save	Joni; 24.29% to save	Dani; 42.79% to save	Tuulikki; 8.79% to save	Pertti; 1.65% to win	Jonathan; 3.72% to win
Evicted	Anne; 4.42% to save	Jussi; 23.76% to save	Markku; 22.28% to save	Janne; 21.12% to save	Nimo; 17.96% to save	Jarno; 24.14% to save	Jonna; 28.55% to save	Joni; 24.29% to save	Dani; 42.79% to save	Leyla; 5.47% to save	Jenna; 6.29% to win	Joonas; 8.77% to win
Evicted	Anne; 4.42% to save	Jussi; 23.76% to save	Markku; 22.28% to save	Janne; 21.12% to save	Nimo; 17.96% to save	Jarno; 24.14% to save	Jonna; 28.55% to save	Joni; 24.29% to save	Dani; 42.79% to save	Armi; 3.47% to save	Anna; 12.23% to win	Andte; 65.39% to win

=== Notes ===
- ^Note 1 : This week's nominations were fake. Unknown to the housemates, all of them were up for eviction.
- ^Note 2 : Janne and Leyla were exempt to nominate and immune as new housemates.
- ^Note 3 : People in the Quarry can't nominate.
- ^Note 4 : Nimo is up for eviction as a penalty.
- ^Note 5 : New housemates give 3+2 nomination points instead of 2+1.
- ^Note 6 : No nominations, Weekly task decides who are up for eviction.
- ^Note 7 : People in Operation Autumn storm have immunity for two weeks.
- ^Note 8 : Dani is up for eviction as a penalty and he cannot get nomination points.
- ^Note 9 : Similar to Big Brother Danmark, one housemate was the killer and had to choose 2 victims. If these 2 victims guess correctly who "killed" them, the killer will be nominated. If they guess wrong, they will be nominated with the person who they guessed was the killer and Dani (who was automatically nominated). Joni and Jussi K were the victims, and they guessed Joonas was the killer. As they guessed wrong (Jenna was the real killer), Joni, Jussi K and Joonas were nominated along with Dani. This concept continued on week 10 with two new murderers and new victims.
- ^Note 10 : Fake nominations. All housemates are up for eviction.
- ^Note 11 : This week voting is for the winner. Everyone is up for voting.

== Nominations Totals Received ==
	Week 2	Week 3	Week 4	Week 5	Week 6	Week 7	Week 8	Week 9	Week 10	Week 11	Week 12	Total
Andte	0	0	0	0	2	1	-	-	-	4	Winner	7
Anna	0	0	0	2	2	0	-	-	-	0	Runner-Up	4
Joonas	2	1	1	0	0	2	-	-	-	2	Third place	8
Jenna	2	4	0	0	0	0	-	-	-	6	Fourth place	12
Jonathan	0	1	8	8	7	14	-	-	-	5	Fifth place	43
Pertti	Not in House					-	-	-	-	1	Sixth place	1
Jussi K	Not in House					-	-	-	-	5	Seventh place	5
Tuija	1	0	0	0	0	2	-	-	-	0	Eighth place	3
Armi	2	12	7	3	0	5	-	-	-	3	Evicted	32
Leyla	Not in House	-	4	3	1	2	-	-	-	5	Evicted	15
Tuulikki	7	7	8	10	5	8	-	-	-	2	Evicted	47
Dani	0	0	0	1	2	2	-	-	-	Evicted		5
Joni	4	0	5	2	5	2	-	-	Evicted			18
Jonna	0	0	1	0	1	2	-	Evicted				4
Jarno	5	0	2	8	8	9	Evicted					32
Nimo	1	1	2	2	0	Evicted						6
Janne	Not in House	-	2	6	Evicted							8
Markku	3	7	8	Evicted								18
Jussi	9	12	Evicted									21
Anne	12	Evicted										12
Tommy	Ejected											N/A

- Week 2 nominations were fake.
- Week 11 nominations were fake.
