= BB06 =

BB06 might refer to:

- Big Brother Australia 2006, the sixth season of the Australian television series Big Brother Australia
- Big Brother Suomi 2006, the second season of the Finnish reality television series Big Brother Suomi
- Branch Barks 2006: The Lost Generation
- Cryptography: the signature forgery attack created by Daniel Bleichenbacher
