= Big Brother (Finnish TV series) season 13 =

Big Brother
- Season 13
- Native name: Big Brother Suomi VIP
- Presented by: Anni Hautala; Tinni Wikström; Kimmo Vehviläinen
- No. of days: 19
- No. of housemates: 14
- Winner: Petra Maarit Olli
- Runner-up: Markku Pulli
- No. of episodes: 19

Release
- Original network: Nelonen
- Original release: 2 May – 20 May 2021

Series chronology
- ← Previous; Big Brother 2020 Next → Big Brother 2021

Big Brother Suomi VIP was the second celebrity season and the thirteenth season overall of the Finnish reality show Big Brother Suomi. The show started on 2 May 2021, on Nelonen and finished on 20 May 2021, lasted for three weeks.

Anni Hautala hosted the live shows alongside Tinni Wikström, Kimmo Vehviläinen hosted the Daily Show. In this season, the live eviction shows were held four times a week, on Tuesdays, Thursdays, Saturdays and Sundays. On Mondays, Wednesdays and Fridays, there were three Daily Shows featuring a summary of events that happened in a day and analyze twists and turns with various guests and evicted housemates.

After the previous two seasons took place in 2019 and 2020, the Big Brother house moved from the shopping center Redi located in Kalasatama to a new location in Vantaa.

The winner of Big Brother Suomi VIP was Petra Maarit Olli and the grand prize for the winner was €30,000.

== Housemates ==
Housemates	Age on Entry	Occupation	Residence	Day entered	Day exited	Status
Petra Maarit Olli	26	Retired freestyle wrestler	Lappajärvi	1	19	Winner
Markku Pulli	33	Actor	Helsinki	1	19	Runner-up
Nina Margita Mikkonen	56	Former municipality councilor	Helsinki	1	19	Third place
Sara Maria Forsberg	27	Singer, songwriter and YouTube personality	Jakobstad	1	19	Fourth place
Aleksi Valavuori	42	Businessman, TV host and sport manager	Teuva	1	17	Evicted
Pinja Sanaksenaho	18	YouTube personality	Helsinki	1	15	Evicted
Roni Johan Kristoffer Bäck	27	YouTube personality	Orimattila	1	15	Evicted
Janne Porkka	55	Impressionist, comedian and TV host	Turku	1	14	Evicted
Seppo Mauno Antero "Sedu" Koskinen	63	Businessman	Pälkäne	1	12	Evicted
Sanna-Kaisa Ukkola	46	Journalist and columnist	Helsinki	1	10	Evicted
Saija Marjatta "Sani" Aartela	49	Singer and songwriter	Hämeenlinna	1	8	Evicted
Rosa Anneli Meriläinen	45	Former member of parliament	Tampere	1	7	Evicted
Toni Markus Nieminen	45	Retired ski jumper	Lahti	1	5	Evicted
Kelly Kalonji	33	Model and Miss Helsinki 2013	Helsinki	1	3	Evicted

== Nominations table ==
The first housemate in each box was nominated for two points, and the second housemate was nominated for one point.

	Day 1	Day 4	Day 6	Day 7	Day 9	Day 11	Day 13	Day 14	Day 15	Day 19 Final		Nomination points received
Petra	No nominations	Rosa; Sedu	Sara; Sanna	No nominations	Nominated	Janne; Nina	Pinja; Nina	No nominations	No nominations	Winner (Day 19)		2
Markku	No nominations	Rosa; Sanna	Sanna; Rosa	No nominations	Nominated	Pinja; Sedu	Pinja; Sara	No nominations	No nominations	Runner-up (Day 19)		13
Nina	No nominations	Toni; Rosa	Sedu; Rosa	No nominations	Exempt	Sedu; Markku	4-Janne; 2-Markku	No nominations	No nominations	Third place (Day 19)		7
Sara	No nominations	Rosa; Toni	Rosa; Roni	No nominations	Nominated	Sedu; Nina	Aleksi; Pinja	No nominations	No nominations	Fourth place (Day 19)		8
Aleksi	No nominations	Sara; Markku	Pinja; Roni	No nominations	Nominated	Janne; Pinja	4-Janne; 2-Pinja	No nominations	No nominations	Evicted (Day 17)		8
Pinja	No nominations	Sanna; Sedu	Sanna; Sedu	No nominations	Exempt	Markku; Janne	Aleksi; Janne	No nominations	Evicted (Day 15)			13
Roni	No nominations	Sanna; Rosa	Markku; Sani	No nominations	Exempt	Sedu; Markku	4-Markku; 2-Janne	No nominations	Evicted (Day 15)			3
Janne	No nominations	Rosa; Sanna	Rosa; Sedu	No nominations	Exempt	Nina; Sedu	4-Aleksi; 2-Sara	Evicted (Day 14)				21
Sedu	No nominations	Rosa; Sanna	Sani; Roni	No nominations	Exempt	Nina; Pinja	Evicted (Day 12)					18
Sanna	No nominations	Petra; Sedu	Janne; Sara	No nominations	Nominated	Evicted (Day 10)						18
Sani	No nominations	Sanna; Sedu	Sanna; Sedu	No nominations	Evicted (Day 8)							3
Rosa	No nominations	Toni; Janne	Janne; Sedu	Evicted (Day 7)								19
Toni	No nominations	Sanna; Rosa	Evicted (Day 5)									5
Kelly	No nominations	Evicted (Day 3)										N/A
Notes	1	2	3, 4	5, 6	7	8	9	10	11	none		
Immunity winner	none	Aleksi	Nina	Janne	none	Sara	Roni	Aleksi	none			
Saved by competition	none		Sedu	none								
Against public vote	All; Housemates	Nina; Rosa; Sanna; Toni	Janne; Markku; Rosa; Sanna; ~~Sedu~~	Aleksi; Markku; Nina; Petra; Pinja; Roni; Sani; Sara; Sanna; Sedu	Aleksi; Markku; Petra; Sanna; Sara	Janne; Nina; Roni; Sedu	Aleksi; Janne; Markku; Pinja	Markku; Nina; Petra; Pinja; Roni; Sara	All; Housemates			
Evicted	Kelly; 27.6% (out of 3) to save	Toni; 32.8% (out of 3) to save	Rosa; 17% (out of 3) to save	Sani; 31.9% (out of 3) to save	Sanna; 20.6% (out of 3) to save	Sedu; 31.3% (out of 3) to save	Janne; 32.2% (out of 3) to save	Roni; 7.4% (out of 3) to save	Aleksi; 31.9% (out of 3) to save	Sara; 6.9% (out of 4)	Nina; 31.2% (out of 3)	
Evicted	Kelly; 27.6% (out of 3) to save	Toni; 32.8% (out of 3) to save	Rosa; 17% (out of 3) to save	Sani; 31.9% (out of 3) to save	Sanna; 20.6% (out of 3) to save	Sedu; 31.3% (out of 3) to save	Janne; 32.2% (out of 3) to save	Pinja; 43.3% (out of 3) to save	Aleksi; 31.9% (out of 3) to save	Markku; 47% (out of 2)		
Saved	Markku; Nina; Sanna; Sara; Most votes (out of 14)	Sanna; Most votes (out of 4)	Markku; Most votes (out of 4)	Aleksi; Markku; Petra; Pinja; Roni; Sara; Sanna; Most votes (out of 10)	Markku; Petra; Most votes (out of 5)	Janne; Most votes (out of 4)	Markku; Most votes (out of 4)	Markku; Petra; Sara; Most votes (out of 6)	Markku; Petra; Most votes (out of 5)	Petra; 53% to win		
Saved	Pinja; Roni; Rosa; Toni; Most votes (out of 10)	Sanna; Most votes (out of 4)	Markku; Most votes (out of 4)	Aleksi; Markku; Petra; Pinja; Roni; Sara; Sanna; Most votes (out of 10)	Markku; Petra; Most votes (out of 5)	Janne; Most votes (out of 4)	Markku; Most votes (out of 4)	Markku; Petra; Sara; Most votes (out of 6)	Markku; Petra; Most votes (out of 5)	Petra; 53% to win		
Saved	Janne; Sani; Sedu; Most votes (out of 6)	Rosa; 33.7% Nina; 33.5% (out of 3)	Janne; 49.5% Sanna; 33.5% (out of 3)	Nina; 36% Sedu; 32.1% (out of 3)	Sara; 39.8% Aleksi; 39.6% (out of 3)	Roni; 36.2%% Nina; 32.5% (out of 3)	Aleksi; 35% Pinja; 32.8% (out of 3)	Nina; 49.3% (out of 3)	Nina; 34.9% Sara; 33.2% (out of 3)	Petra; 53% to win		
Saved	Aleksi; 41.5% Petra; 30.9% (out of 3)	Rosa; 33.7% Nina; 33.5% (out of 3)	Janne; 49.5% Sanna; 33.5% (out of 3)	Nina; 36% Sedu; 32.1% (out of 3)	Sara; 39.8% Aleksi; 39.6% (out of 3)	Roni; 36.2%% Nina; 32.5% (out of 3)	Aleksi; 35% Pinja; 32.8% (out of 3)	Nina; 49.3% (out of 3)	Nina; 34.9% Sara; 33.2% (out of 3)	Petra; 53% to win		

=== Notes ===
- ^Note 1: All housemates were nominated for eviction. During the live show on Tuesday (Day 3), voting pauses several times between each round of save. Aleksi, Kelly and Petra received the fewest votes, then, they went to the studio and voting continues between them. In the end, Kelly received the least voting support of 27.6% and she was evicted.
- ^Note 2: After the eviction of Kelly, Aleksi and Petra had an immunity challenge live in the studio for the immunity on the next round of eviction, Aleksi won. As a consolation prize, Petra received a time bomb. Big Brother announced that the housemate who holds the time bomb in their hands when the time bomb explodes will automatically be nominated. Housemates were not told when the bomb would explode. On Day 4, the time bomb "exploded" on Nina's hand, therefore, she was nominated for eviction.
- ^Note 3: After the eviction of Toni, Nina and Rosa had an immunity challenge live in the studio for the immunity on the next round of eviction, Nina won.
- ^Note 4: The second nominations were held on Day 6, but the nominees were not decided until after the nomination competition. Sedu would have also nominated for eviction based on the nomination points, but he won the nomination competition. As a prize, Sedu saved himself and he replaced Markku for eviction.
- ^Note 5: After the eviction of Rosa, Janne and Sanna had an immunity challenge live in the studio for the immunity on the next round of eviction, Janne won.
- ^Note 6: For this round of eviction, all housemates except Janne were nominated, one of them would be evicted on the next day (Day 8).
- ^Note 7: For this round of nominations, there were no nominations been held, instead, the housemates were split into two teams and the nominees were decided by the outcome of the cooking theme nomination task. Blue team: Janne, Nina, Pinja, Roni and Sedu. Red team: Aleksi, Markku, Petra, Sanna and Sara. The blue team won the race in the evening and the red team was nominated for eviction.
- ^Note 8: For this round of nominations, the housemates still split into two teams. The red team won the nomination competition. They had to choose one of their team members to receive the immunity, they chose Aleksi. And they had to choose one of the members of the blue team to be nominated for eviction. Roni volunteered to be nominated.
- ^Note 9: Aleksi and Pinja swapped teams. The blue team won the nomination competition and they got their nomination points doubled.
- ^Note 10: This round of eviction was a double eviction, the two housemates who received the fewest votes would be evicted.
- ^Note 11: For the final round of eviction, all housemates were nominated for eviction, one housemate would be evicted before the final.
