= Big Brother (Finnish TV series) season 15 =

Big Brother
- Season 15
- Presented by: Anni Ihamäki; Sami Kuronen; Janni Hussi
- No. of days: 85
- No. of contestants: 21
- Winner: Reeo Tiiainen
- Runner-up: Laura Hytönen
- Companion show: BB-podcast on Supla.fi

Release
- Original network: Nelonen; Ruutu (Stream)
- Original release: 4 September – 27 November 2022

Series chronology
- ← Previous; Big Brother 2021 Next → Big Brother 2026

Big Brother 2022 is the fifteenth season of Big Brother Suomi premiered on 4 September 2022 on Nelonen with a 24/7 live feed on Ruutu.fi streaming service.

Anni Ihamäki was the host of the weekly live show on sunday. Daily Show was co-hosted by Sami Kuronen and Janni Hussi.

The show lasted 85 days, ending on 27 November 2022. Reeo Tiiainen was announced as the winner of the show.

== Housemates ==
Twelve hosuemates entered the hosue on Day 1. Jerry and Pirkka entered on Day 6. Aleksi and Mia entered on Day 9. Mathias and Milena entered on Day 13. Salla entered on Day 16. Karvan and Milla entered on Day 19.

Housemates	Age on Entry	Occupation	Residence	Day entered	Day exited	Status
Reeo Tiiainen	49	Restaurant chef	Helsinki	1	85	Winner
Laura Hytönen	35	Accountant	Helsinki	1	85	Runner-up
Mia Haataja	26	Registered nurse	Helsinki	9	85	Third place
Miikka Tuomola	29	Warehouse worker	Turku	1	85	Fourth place
Salla Maria Aaltonen	39	Office manager	Järvenpää	16	82	Evicted
Heidi Einsbor	21	Shop assistant	Nousiainen	1	78	Evicted
Milena AbbasMamode	31	American football player Participated in Gladiators	Nokia	13	71	Evicted
Sofia Elle Tuomola	27	Entrepreneur and sex worker	Naantal/Manchester, UK	1	64	Evicted
Nabaz Baki	38	Barber and hairdresser	Helsinki (Originally from Iraq)	1	59	Walked
Tuula Heliste	59	Kindergarten director	Oulu	1	57	Evicted
Merve Jasmin Demir	26	Social worker and special counselor	Helsinki	26	50	Evicted
Milla Sihvola	32	Practical nurse	Vantaa	32	43	Evicted
Aleksi Hakanen	22	Swimming instructor and substitute teacher	Huittinen	22	36	Evicted
Karvan Ahmadi	30	Freelancer and school attendance instructor	Vaasa	30	33	Walked
Mathias Meltsas	24	Terrace shift manager	Helsinki	24	29	Evicted
Kirsi Järvilehto	25	Media assistant amd student	Helsinki	25	22	Evicted
Ruzbeh Mohsenchian	26	Sales negotiator	Turku	1	18	Evicted
Jerry Juusela	26	Marketing company owner	Tallinna	6	15	Evicted
Pirkka Hallamaa	34	Student	Turku	6	11	Evicted
Daiyana Simão Kuango	24	Saleswoman and model	Vantaa	1	8	Evicted
Marko Mäkipää	34	Nurse and youth counselor	Suolahti	1	4	Evicted
Guest
Saara Aalto	35	Singer, song writer voice actress	-	55	56	Left
Petra Olli	28	Freestyle wrestler	Tallinna	29	31	Left

== Nominations table ==
The first housemate in each box was nominated for two points, and the second housemate was nominated for one point.

	Week 1		Week 2		Week 3		Week 4	Week 5	Week 6	Week 7			Week 8	Week 9	Week 10	Week 11	Week 12		
	House vote	Public vote	House vote	Public vote	House vote	Public vote	Week 4	Week 5	Week 6	Fake nominations	Fake eviction	Nominations	Week 8	Week 9	Week 10	Week 11	Day 82	Final	
Nominator(s)	Daiyana; Kirsi	none	Kirsi; Reeo	none	Milena; Sofia	none													
Nominations	Heidi; Marko	none	Jerry; Merve; Pirkka	none	Nabaz; Ruzbeh; Sofia	none													
Head of House	none						Laura	Laura	Heidi	Milena			Reeo	none					
Reeo	Marko	Tuula; Laura	Nominator	Tuula; Jerry	Ruzbeh	Salla; Mathias	Milla; Mathias	Aleksi; Mia	Laura; Merve	Merve; Laura	Merve	Merve; Laura	Head of House	Not eligible	Mia (1); Heidi (1)	Mia; Salla	Nominated	Winner (Day 85)	
Laura	Marko	Ruzbeh; Tuula	Pirkka	Tuula; Ruzbeh	Ruzbeh	Tuula; Salla	Reeo; Salla	Reeo; Tuula	Salla; Reeo	Salla; Heidi	Heidi	Salla; Reeo	Safe	Not eligible	Miikka (1)	Heidi; Reeo	Safe	Runner-up (Day 85)	
Mia	Not in House		Pirkka	Reeo; Ruzbeh	Ruzbeh	Kirsi; Heidi	Salla; Mathias	Heidi; Reeo	Milla; Salla	Salla; Heidi	Heidi	Reeo; Salla	Nominated	Not eligible	Salla (3); Milena (3)	Heidi; Reeo	Nominated	Third place (Day 85)	
Miikka	Marko	Tuula; Nabaz	Pirkka	Jerry; Tuula	Sofia	Mathias; Salla	Mathias; Milla	Milena; Aleksi	Laura; Merve	Merve; Laura	Merve	Merve; Laura	Safe	Laura; Salla; Sofia	Salla (3); Laura (3)	Salla; Laura	Safe	Fourth place (Day 85)	
Salla	Not in House				Ruzbeh	Kirsi; Aleksi	Milena; Nabaz	Milena; Mia	Mia; Sofia	Laura; Merve	Laura	Merve; Laura	Safe	Not eligible	Miikka (1)	Reeo; Miikka	Nominated	Evicted (Day 82)	
Heidi	Marko	Kirsi; Daiyana; Kirs	Pirkka	Tuula; Jerry	Nabaz	Aleksi; Kirsi	Milena; Aleksi	Mia; Milena	Merve; Milena	Sofia; Merve	Laura	Secret Room	Safe	Laura; Salla; Sofia	Milena (3); Laura (3)	Laura; Mia	Evicted (Day 78)		
Milena	Not in House				Nominator	Salla; Tuula	Salla; Heidi	Aleksi; Mia	Salla; Reeo	Heidi; Salla	Heidi	Salla; Reeo	Nominated	Laura; Salla; Sofia	Miikka (1); Heidi (1)	Evicted (Day 71)			
Sofia	Marko	Ruzbeh; Heidi	Pirkka	Ruzbeh; Heidi	Nominator; Nominated	Heidi; Salla	Salla; Milla	Heidi; Milla	Milla; Salla	Heidi; Salla	Heidi	Salla; Miikka	Safe	Laura; Salla; Sofia	Evicted (Day 64)				
Nabaz	Marko	Daiyana; Laura	Pirkka	Heidi; Ruzbeh	Ruzbeh	Heidi; Mathias	Karvan; Milla	Milena; Aleksi	Laura; Milena	Laura; Salla	Salla	Laura; Salla	Nominated	Walked (Day 59)					
Tuula	Marko	Daiyana; Laura	Pirkka	Heidi; Laura	Ruzbeh	Heidi; Laura	Mathias (2); Karvan (2); Heidi (1); Milla (1)	Mia; Aleksi	Laura; Milena	Banned	Laura	Laura; Salla	Nominated	Evicted (Day 57)					
Merve	Marko	Daiyana; Heidi	Pirkka	Ruzbeh; Tuula	Ruzbeh	Salla; Tuula	Reeo; Salla	Tuula; Reeo	Salla; Reeo	Heidi; Salla	Heidi	Reeo; Salla	Evicted (Day 50)						
Milla	Not in House					Kirsi; Aleksi	Nabaz; Milena	Mia; Aleksi	Mia; Laura	Evicted (Day 43)									
Aleksi	Not in House		Pirkka	Heidi; Reeo	Ruzbeh	Kirsi; Heidi	Reeo; Salla	Heidi; Reeo	Evicted (Day 36)										
Karvan	Not in House					Kirsi; Sofia	Nabaz; Salla	Walked (Day 33)											
Mathias	Not in House				Ruzbeh	Kirsi; Nabaz	Reeo; Nabaz	Evicted (Day 29)											
Kirsi	Nominator	Ruzbeh; Heidi	Nominator	Ruzbeh; Heidi	Ruzbeh	Salla; Heidi	Evicted (Day 22)												
Ruzbeh	Marko	Daiyana; Tuula; Kirs	Pirkka	Jerry; Tuula	Sofia	Evicted (Day 18)													
Jerry	Not in House		Pirkka	Ruzbeh; Heidi	Evicted (Day 15)														
Pirkka	Not in House		Jerry	Evicted (Day 11)															
Daiyana	Nominator	Tuula; Ruzbeh	Evicted (Day 8)																
Marko	Heidi	Evicted (Day 4)																	
Notes	1	2	3	4	5	6	7	8	9	10		11	12	13	14	15	16		
Nomination competition winner	none	Heidi	none	Aleksi; Heidi	none	Laura	Heidi; Karvan; Mathias; Mia; Miikka	Mia; Heidi	Merve	none				Heidi; Milena; Miikka; Sofia	Mia; Miikka; Heidi	Heidi	none		
Nominated (pre-save and replace)	Heidi; Marko; Reeo	Daiyana; Kirsi; Ruzbeh; Tuula	Jerry; Merve; Pirkka	Heidi; Jerry; Ruzbeh; Tuula	Nabaz; Ruzbeh; Sofia	Aleksi; Heidi; Kirsi; Mathias; Salla; Tuula	Mathias; Milla; Nabaz; Reeo; Salla	Aleksi; Heidi; Mia; Milena	Laura; Merve; Mia; Milla; Salla	All Housemates	Heidi; Laura; Merve; Salla	Laura; Merve; Reeo; Salla	none			Heidi; Reeo	none		
Saved	none			Heidi	none	Aleksi; Heidi	Reeo	Heidi	Merve	none		Laura	none						
Against public vote	none	Daiyana; Kirsi; Ruzbeh; Tuula	none	Jerry; Ruzbeh; Tuula; Miikka	none	Kirsi; Mathias; Salla; Tuula	Mathias; Milla; Nabaz; Salla	Aleksi; Mia; Milena; Reeo	Laura; Mia; Milla; Salla	none		Merve; Nabaz; Reeo; Salla	Heidi; Laura; Miikka; Mia; Milena; Nabaz; Salla; Sofia; Tuula	Laura; Salla; Sofia	Laura; Miikka; Milena; Salla	Heidi; Mia; Reeo	Mia; Reeo; Salla	Laura; Mia; Miikka; Reeo	
Evicted	Marko; 9 of 10 votes to evict	Daiyana; 28.9% (out of 3) to save	Pirkka; 11 of 12 votes to evict	Jerry; 31.2% (out of 3) to save	Ruzbeh; 10 of 13 votes to evict	Kirsi; 20.0% (out of 3) to save	Mathias; 30.2% (out of 3) to save	Aleksi; 31.6% (out of 3) to save	Milla; 28.4% (out of 3) to save	Heidi; 8 points to nominate	Heidi; 5 of 11 votes to fake evict	Merve; 30.4% (out of 3) to save	Tuula; 24.7% (out of 3) to save	Sofia; 48.4% (out of 2) to save	Milena; 18.0% (out of 3) to save	Heidi; 32.8% (out of 2) to save	Salla; 9.2% to save	Miikka; Fewest votes (out of 4) to win	Mia; Fewest votes (out of 4) to win
Evicted	Marko; 9 of 10 votes to evict	Daiyana; 28.9% (out of 3) to save	Pirkka; 11 of 12 votes to evict	Jerry; 31.2% (out of 3) to save	Ruzbeh; 10 of 13 votes to evict	Kirsi; 20.0% (out of 3) to save	Mathias; 30.2% (out of 3) to save	Aleksi; 31.6% (out of 3) to save	Milla; 28.4% (out of 3) to save	Salla; 8 points to nominate	Heidi; 5 of 11 votes to fake evict	Merve; 30.4% (out of 3) to save	Tuula; 24.7% (out of 3) to save	Sofia; 48.4% (out of 2) to save	Milena; 18.0% (out of 3) to save	Heidi; 32.8% (out of 2) to save	Salla; 9.2% to save	Miikka; Fewest votes (out of 4) to win	Mia; Fewest votes (out of 4) to win
Evicted	Marko; 9 of 10 votes to evict	Daiyana; 28.9% (out of 3) to save	Pirkka; 11 of 12 votes to evict	Jerry; 31.2% (out of 3) to save	Ruzbeh; 10 of 13 votes to evict	Kirsi; 20.0% (out of 3) to save	Mathias; 30.2% (out of 3) to save	Aleksi; 31.6% (out of 3) to save	Milla; 28.4% (out of 3) to save	Merve; 6 points to nominate	Heidi; 5 of 11 votes to fake evict	Merve; 30.4% (out of 3) to save	Tuula; 24.7% (out of 3) to save	Sofia; 48.4% (out of 2) to save	Milena; 18.0% (out of 3) to save	Heidi; 32.8% (out of 2) to save	Salla; 9.2% to save	Laura; 41.3% (out of 2) to win	
Evicted	Marko; 9 of 10 votes to evict	Daiyana; 28.9% (out of 3) to save	Pirkka; 11 of 12 votes to evict	Jerry; 31.2% (out of 3) to save	Ruzbeh; 10 of 13 votes to evict	Kirsi; 20.0% (out of 3) to save	Mathias; 30.2% (out of 3) to save	Aleksi; 31.6% (out of 3) to save	Milla; 28.4% (out of 3) to save	Laura; 6 points to nominate	Heidi; 5 of 11 votes to fake evict	Merve; 30.4% (out of 3) to save	Tuula; 24.7% (out of 3) to save	Sofia; 48.4% (out of 2) to save	Milena; 18.0% (out of 3) to save	Heidi; 32.8% (out of 2) to save	Salla; 9.2% to save	Laura; 41.3% (out of 2) to win	
Saved	Heidi; 1 of 10 votes Reeo; 0 of 10 votes	Krisi; Most votes (out of 4)	Jerry; 1 of 12 votes Merve; 0 of 12 votes	Miikka; Most votes (out of 4)	Sofia; 2 of 13 votes Nabaz; 0 of 13 votes	Salla; Most votes (out of 4)	Nabaz; Most votes (out of 4)	Reeo; Most votes (out of 4)	Laura; Most votes (out of 4)	none	Laura; 3 of 13 votes Merve; 2 of 13 votes Salla; 1 of 13 votes	Reeo; Most votes (out of 4)	Heidi; 29.9% Laura; 24.2% Miikka; 16.3% (out of 9)	Laura; Most votes (out of 3)	Laura; Most votes (out of 4)	Mia; Most votes (out of 3)	Reeo; 50.8% Mia; 40.0%	Reeo; 58.7% to win	
Saved	Heidi; 1 of 10 votes Reeo; 0 of 10 votes	Krisi; Most votes (out of 4)	Jerry; 1 of 12 votes Merve; 0 of 12 votes	Miikka; Most votes (out of 4)	Sofia; 2 of 13 votes Nabaz; 0 of 13 votes	Salla; Most votes (out of 4)	Nabaz; Most votes (out of 4)	Reeo; Most votes (out of 4)	Laura; Most votes (out of 4)	none	Laura; 3 of 13 votes Merve; 2 of 13 votes Salla; 1 of 13 votes	Reeo; Most votes (out of 4)	Sofia; 24.1% Salla; 22.1% (out of 6)	Laura; Most votes (out of 3)	Laura; Most votes (out of 4)	Mia; Most votes (out of 3)	Reeo; 50.8% Mia; 40.0%	Reeo; 58.7% to win	
Saved	Heidi; 1 of 10 votes Reeo; 0 of 10 votes	Ruzbeh; 37.8% Tuula; 33.3% (out of 3)	Jerry; 1 of 12 votes Merve; 0 of 12 votes	Ruzbeh; 36.8% Tuula; 32.0% (out of 3)	Sofia; 2 of 13 votes Nabaz; 0 of 13 votes	Mathias; 43.3; Tuula; 36.7% (out of 3)	Milla; 35.9% Salla; 33.9% (out of 3)	Milena; 35.3% Mia; 33.1% (out of 3)	Mia; 42.8% Salla; 28.8% (out of 3)	none	Laura; 3 of 13 votes Merve; 2 of 13 votes Salla; 1 of 13 votes	Salla; 35.1% Nabaz; 34.5% (out of 3)	Mia ?% (out of 4)	Salla; 51.6% (out of 2)	Miikka; 48.1% Salla; 33.9% (out of 3)	Reeo; 67.2% (out of 2)	Reeo; 50.8% Mia; 40.0%	Reeo; 58.7% to win	
Saved	Heidi; 1 of 10 votes Reeo; 0 of 10 votes	Ruzbeh; 37.8% Tuula; 33.3% (out of 3)	Jerry; 1 of 12 votes Merve; 0 of 12 votes	Ruzbeh; 36.8% Tuula; 32.0% (out of 3)	Sofia; 2 of 13 votes Nabaz; 0 of 13 votes	Mathias; 43.3; Tuula; 36.7% (out of 3)	Milla; 35.9% Salla; 33.9% (out of 3)	Milena; 35.3% Mia; 33.1% (out of 3)	Mia; 42.8% Salla; 28.8% (out of 3)	none	Laura; 3 of 13 votes Merve; 2 of 13 votes Salla; 1 of 13 votes	Salla; 35.1% Nabaz; 34.5% (out of 3)	Nabaz; 40.6% Milena; 34.7% (out of 3)	Salla; 51.6% (out of 2)	Miikka; 48.1% Salla; 33.9% (out of 3)	Reeo; 67.2% (out of 2)	Reeo; 50.8% Mia; 40.0%	Reeo; 58.7% to win	

=== Notes ===
- ^Note 1: Nabaz drew immunity from handle of fate, Reeo got nominated from handle of fate. Marko and Ruzbeh won the eviction competition, but their performance was disqualified due to a rule break. Kirsi and Daiyana were declared the winners. They nominate Heidi and Marko for the eviction.
- ^Note 2: Heidi won the nomination competition and chose Ruzbeh as her partner, they could nominate the fourth housemate for the eviction. They chose Kirs.
- ^Note 3: Aleksi and Mia were immuned from Wednesday's house vote eviction. Kirsi and Reeo won the eviction competition and nominate Jerry, Merve and Pirka for the eviction.
- ^Note 4: Aleksi and Heidi won the nomination competition and could replace one nominated housemate with another. They replaced Heidi with Miikka.
- ^Note 5: Salla was immuned from Wednesday's house vote eviction. Milena and Sofia won the eviction competition and nominate Nabaz, Ruzbeh and Sofia for the eviction.
- ^Note 6: Milla and Karvan were immuned from this round of nomination, but they were allowed to nominate. In addition to this, they were allowed to choose one housemate who did not participate in the nomination competition. They chose Kirs. The remaining eight housemates (Nabaz, Heidi, Laura, Tuula, Mathias, Salla, Aleksi and Sofia) who received nomination points, participated in the competition. Laura won the competition and she chose Merve to accompany her and they were able to save two nominated housemates. They chose Aleksi and Heidi.
- ^Note 7: Laura became the Head of House and was immuned from nomination. Tuula had additional nomination points and could nominate four housemates. The blue team (Heidi, Karvan, Mathias, Mia and Miikka) won the nomination competition. Laura chose three housemates from the blue team, who could influence the outcome of the nominations. He chose Karvani, Mia and Miika. They were allowed to save one nominated hosuemate. They chose Reeo.
- ^Note 8: Laura and Milena won the Head of House competition. Laura was elected Head of House in the Head of House election and she was immuned from nominations. Laura had to decide that Miikka and Reeo were not allowed to participate in the nomination competition. Mia and Heidi won the nomination competition and could replace one nominated housemate with another. They replaced Heidi with Reeo.
- ^Note 9: Heidi became the Head of House and was immuned from nomination. Merve won the nomination competition. He chose Laura as his partner. They were able to save one nominated housemate. They saved Merve.
- ^Note 10: Milena won the Head of House competition and was immuned from nomination. For the fake eviction, housemates had to nominate face-to-face for this round of nomination. Tuula's right to nominate was rejected by Big Brother due to a violation of the rules by writing the nomination after the time had already expired. Each housemate voted to one of the four housemates (Heidi, Laura, Merve or Salla) in the diary room. Heidi was fake evicted.
- ^Note 11: No nomination competition was held, but Heidi and Milena had the power to influence the outcome of Friday's nomination. They saved Laura and replaced her with Nabazi.
- ^Note 12: No nomination this week, instead, all housemates except the Head of House Reeo were nominated. On Wednesday, the three housemates, Heidi, Laura and Miikka, received the most votes were safe, and on Saturday, Sofia and Salla, received the most votes were safe. Tuula received the fewest votes to save and was evicted.
- ^Note 13: The house was divided into two parts, Upper and Lower. The Uppers (Heidi, Milena, Miikka and Sofia) won the nomination competition. Nominations were not organized, but the winners of the nomination competition got to decide which housemates will be put to the eviction vote.
- ^Note 14: Uppers and Lowers competed against each other in nomination competitions with a total of 24 nomination points up for grabs. The upper house won 18 nomination points, the lower house won 6 nomination points.
- ^Note 15: Heidi won the nomination competition and she could nominate one housemate for the eviction. She chose Mia.
- ^Note 16: No nomination this week, instead, the two housemates who received the most points from Tuesday's and Wednesday's final challenge (Miikka and Laura) were safe from eviction, from which one housemate was evicted on Thursday. The four housemates who remained in the house faced the public vote to win.
