= Big Brother (Finnish TV series) season 9 =

Big Brother
- Season 9
- Native name: Julkkis Big Brother
- Presented by: Mari Sainio
- No. of days: 41
- No. of housemates: 16
- Winner: Jori Kopponen
- Runner-up: Niko Saarinen
- Companion shows: Big Brother Talk Show; Big Brother Extra

Release
- Original network: Sub
- Original release: 3 August – 13 October 2013

Season chronology
- ← Previous; Big Brother 2012 Next → Big Brother 2014

Julkkis Big Brother was the first celebrity season and the ninth season overall of the Finnish reality television series Big Brother. (Note: Sub clarified the following year that the 2014 edition of the program was the tenth overall season of Big Brother in Finland.) It was premiered on 3 September 2013, on Sub. This season finished in 6 weeks. The host was Mari Sainio again. The prize was €25 000.

== Housemates ==
Name	Age on entry	Hometown	Notability	Day entered	Day exited	Status
Jori A. Kopponen	37	Riihimäki	Magician	1	41	Winner
Niko Saarinen	27	Helsinki	Former housemate of Big Brother; reality TV star	21	41	Runner-up
Anu Saagim-Ratia	51	Tallinn	Magazine editor	1	41	Third Place
Aleks Vehkala	19	Helsinki	Mister Gay Finland 2013	1	41	Fourth Place
Johanna Salminen	45	Hämeenlinna	Miss XL Finland 2011	1	41	Fifth Place
Sara Sieppi	22	Helsinki	Miss Finland 2011	1	39	Evicted
Esko Eerikäinen	40	Helsinki	Member of dance group Scandinavian Hunks	20	34	Evicted
Susanna Ingerttilä	41	Helsinki	Model and editor	20	31	Walked
Daisy (Dog)	6	Helsinki	Susanna Ingerttilä's dog	20	31	Walked
Anne-Mari Miettinen	25	Helsinki	Travel guide; known from the reality TV series	13	27	Evicted
Claudia Eve	45	Helsinki	Psychic, known from the reality TV series	1	23	Ejected
Teppo Säkkinen	33	Helsinki	Mister Finland 2012	1	21	Walked
Frederik (Ilkka Sysimetsä)	68	Helsinki	Singer	1	15	Walked
Susanna Indrén	47	Helsinki	actress	1	13	Evicted
Marianne Kallio	19	Helsinki	Glamour model	1	12	Ejected
Andy McCoy	50	Helsinki	Musician; best known for the rock band Hanoi Rocks	1	10	Ejected
Kai Merilä	46	Somero	journalist	1	6	Evicted

== Nominations table ==
The first housemate in each box was nominated for two points, and the second housemate was nominated for one point.

	Week 1	Week 2	Week 3	Week 4	Week 5	Week 6		
	Week 1	Week 2	Week 3	Week 4	Week 5	Day 39	Final	
Jori	Not; Eligible	Anu; Frederik	Aleks; Anu	Anne-Mari; Anu	Niko; Anu	Sara	Winner (Day 41)	
Niko	Not in House			Jori; Anu	Jori; Anu	Sara	Runner-Up (Day 41)	
Anu	Not; Eligible	Marianne; Frederik	Sara; Teppo	Sara; Anne-Mari	Esko; Niko	Sara	Third place (Day 41)	
Aleks	Not; Eligible	Frederik; Susanna Ind.	Anne-Mari; Teppo	Jori; Anne-Mari	Jori; Esko	Nominated	Fourth place (Day 41)	
Johanna	Not; Eligible	Susanna Ind. Marianne	Teppo; Sara	Anne-Mari; Anu	Sara; Jori	Sara	Fifth place (Day 41)	
Sara	Not; Eligible	Anu; Susanna Ind.	Johanna; Jori	Jori; Anu	Jori; Anu	Nominated	Evicted (Day 39)	
Esko	Not in House			Anu; Johanna	Niko; Johanna	Evicted (Day 34)		
Susanna Ing.	Not in House			Anu; Aleks	Walked (Day 31)			
Anne-Mari	Not in House		Johanna; Aleks	Aleks; Johanna	Evicted (Day 27)			
Claudia	Not; Eligible	Susanna Ind. Frederik	Anne-Mari; Teppo	Ejected (Day 23)				
Teppo	Not; Eligible	Marianne; Anu	Johanna; Aleks	Walked (Day 21)				
Frederik	Not; Eligible	Marianne; Sara	Walked (Day 15)					
Susanna Ind.	Not; Eligible	Claudia; Anu	Evicted (Day 13)					
Marianne	Not; Eligible	Frederik; Anu	Ejected (Day 12)					
Andy	Kai; Frederik; Claudia	Ejected (Day 10)						
Kai	Not; Eligible	Evicted (Day 6)						
Notes	1	none	2	none		3	none	
Up for eviction	Claudia; Frederik; Kai	Anu; Frederik; ~~Marianne~~; Susanna Ind.	none	Anne-Mari; Anu; Jori	Anu; Esko; Jori; Niko	Aleks; Sara	Aleks; Anu; Johanna; Jori; Niko	
Walked	none		Frederik	Teppo	Susanna Ing.	none		
Ejected	none	Andy; Marianne	none	Claudia	none			
Evicted	Kai; 32.33% to save	Susanna Ind. 30.07% to save	No; Eviction	Anne-Mari; 27.52% to save	Esko; 20.66% to save	Sara; 4 of 4 votes to evict	Johanna; 2.81% (out of 5)	Aleks; 6.15% (out of 4)
Evicted	Kai; 32.33% to save	Susanna Ind. 30.07% to save	No; Eviction	Anne-Mari; 27.52% to save	Esko; 20.66% to save	Sara; 4 of 4 votes to evict	Anu; 3.41% (out of 3)	Niko; 49.16% (out of 2)
Evicted	Kai; 32.33% to save	Susanna Ind. 30.07% to save	No; Eviction	Anne-Mari; 27.52% to save	Esko; 20.66% to save	Sara; 4 of 4 votes to evict	Jori; 50.84% to win	

=== Notes ===
- ^Note 1 : The public voted for a mystery opening night twist. The options were 3 and 4. Nothing else were given at the time. When the voting was over, it was revealed what those options meant. The last housemate to enter (Andy) would nominate 3 or 4 housemates for eviction. 3 got more votes, so Andy will decide 3 housemates who will be up for eviction. Also, Andy himself is immune. He nominated Kai, Frederik and Claudia.
- ^Note 2 : This week the nominations were fake.
- ^Note 3 : This week, the public nominates. The two housemates with the most votes will be nominated, Aleks (30.71%) and Sara (24.98%). Then, the housemates who weren't nominated will vote to evict one of them on Friday.

=== Nominations total received ===
	Week 1	Week 2	Week 3	Week 4	Week 5	Week 6	Finale	Total
Jori	0	0	1	6	7	–	Winner	13
Niko	Not in House			–	5	–	Runner-Up	5
Anu	0	7	1	9	3	–	3rd Place	19
Aleks	0	0	4	3	0	0	4th Place	3
Johanna	0	0	6	2	1	–	5th Place	3
Sara	0	1	3	2	2	4	Evicted	5
Esko	Not in House			–	3	Evicted		3
Susanna Ing.	Not in House			–	Walked			0
Anne-Mari	Not in House		4	5	Evicted			5
Claudia	1	2	0	Ejected				3
Teppo	0	0	5	Walked				0
Frederik	1	7	Walked					8
Susanna Ind.	0	6	Evicted					6
Marianne	0	7	Ejected					7
Andy	–	Ejected						0
Kai	1	Evicted						1

- Week 6 numbers don't count, as it wasn't nominations, it was a vote to evict.

=== Nominations: Results ===
Weeks	Nominated	Evicted
Week 1	Frederik (34.01%), Claudia (32.95%), Kai (32.33%)	Kai
Week 2	Frederik (37.55%), Anu (32.06%), Susanna Ind. (30.07%)	Andy (Ejected), Marianne (Ejected), Susanna Ind.
Week 3	No Eviction	Frederik (Walked)
Week 4	Jori (40.07%), Anu (32.24%), Anne-Mari (27.52%)	Teppo (Walked), Claudia (Ejected), Anne-Mari
Week 5	Jori (28.92%), Niko (26.88%), Anu (23.38%), Esko (20.66%)	Susanna Ing. (Walked), Esko
Week 6	Aleks (30.71%), Sara (24.98%)	Sara
Final	Jori (42.8%), Niko (37.33%), Anu (10.04%), Aleks (7.02%), Johanna (2.81%)	Johanna
Final	Jori (45.1%), Niko (40.6%), Anu (8.15%), Aleks (6.15%)	Aleks
Final	Niko (48.96%), Jori (47.63%), Anu (3.41%)	Anu
Final	Jori (50.84%), Niko (49.16%)	Niko
