= Big Brother (Finnish TV series) season 8 =

Big Brother
- Season 8
- Presented by: Elina Viitanen
- No. of days: 98
- No. of housemates: 22
- Winner: Teija Kurvinen
- Runner-up: Iida Repo
- Companion shows: Big Brother Talk Show; Big Brother Extra

Release
- Original network: Sub
- Original release: 27 August – 2 December 2012

Series chronology
- ← Previous; Big Brother 2011 Next → Julkkis Big Brother 2013

Big Brother 2012 is the eighth season of the Finnish reality television series Big Brother that premiered on August 28, 2012, on Sub.

Elina Viitanen returned to host the show, but Susanna Laine did not continue. Viitanen left Big Brother Extra to host the Big Brother Talk Show alone, and new host of Big Brother Extra is singer Cristal Snow.

Teija Kurvinen was the winner.

== Housemates ==
Housemates	Age	Occupation	Residence	Day entered	Day exited	Status
Teija Kurvinen	46	—N/a	Rovaniemi	1	98	Winner
Iida Repo	28	—N/a	Pirkkala	1	98	Runner-up
Jouko Näivä	26	—N/a	Tampere	1	98	Third place
Markus Väänänen	25	—N/a	Eno	1	98	Fourth place
Tea Mirhola	19	—N/a	Helsinki	1	96	Evicted
Jonna A. Kumpula	21	—N/a	Härmä	1	91	Evicted
Tommi Riihimäri	24	—N/a	Hämeenlinna	1	84	Evicted
Tomi Grönroos	23	—N/a	Helsinki	1	77	Evicted
Jarno Köntti	27	—N/a	Kerava	42	71	Walked
Jonna I. Saari	27	—N/a	Kausala	1	70	Evicted
Petteri Koskela	35	—N/a	Vantaa	42	69	Ejected
Joni Meronen	28	—N/a	Helsinki	42	63	Evicted
Johanna Pulkkinen	24	—N/a	Espoo	1	56	Evicted
Katarina Bjurs	26	—N/a	Helsinki	1	49	Evicted
Anne Sipolainen	31	—N/a	Rauma	1	42	Evicted
Sarah Nousiainen	20	—N/a	Vaasa	1	35	Evicted
Irina Bril	42	Unemployed	Hausjärvi	1	33	Ejected
Ira Salin	38	—N/a	Raisio	1	28	Evicted
Leina Ogihara	25	—N/a	Helsinki	1	21	Evicted
Janita Lukkarinen	19	—N/a	Hyvinkää	1	17	Walked
Pia Sarkkinen	31	—N/a	Lohja	1	14	Evicted
Milla Väänänen	25	Journalist of gossip magazine 7 päivää	Helsinki	1	5	Left

- Irina thought she would have been cast for Julkkis Big Brother because her occupation was "unemployed" but the real occupation of her was actress.
- Milla is hired by the production team as an "actress" and in normal life, she works as a journalist in gossip magazine 7 päivää.

== Nominations table ==
The first housemate in each box was nominated for two points, and the second housemate was nominated for one point.

	Week 1		Week 2	Week 3	Week 4	Week 5	Week 6	Week 7	Week 8	Week 9	Week 10	Week 11	Week 12	Week 13	Week 14		
	Nomination	Fake eviction	Week 2	Week 3	Week 4	Week 5	Week 6	Week 7	Week 8	Week 9	Week 10	Week 11	Week 12	Week 13	Day 91	Final	
Teija	Sarah; Pia	Nominated	Janita; Katarina	Katarina; Tea	Not eligible	Johanna; Iida	Iida; Tomi	Tomi(+1); Johanna	Joni; Iida(+1)	No; Nominations	Jonna I Iida	Tommi; Iida	Tommi; Iida	Iida; Tea	No; Nominations	Winner (Day 98)	
Iida	Katarina; Tea	Nominated	Leina; Katarina	Not eligible	Katarina; Ira	Jonna I Jonna A	Teija(+3); Jonna I	Jonna I Jonna A	Teija; Tea	No; Nominations	Tommi; Jonna A	Jonna A Tomi	Jonna A Teija	Teija; Jonna A	No; Nominations	Runner-Up (Day 98)	
Jouko	Katarina; Tea	Sarah	Janita; Katarina	Not eligible	Not eligible	Jonna A Anne	Iida; Jonna A	Jonna A Katarina	Jonna A Johanna	Nominated	Jonna A Petteri	Tomi; Jonna A	Jonna A Tea	Jonna A Teija	No; Nominations	Third place (Day 98)	
Markus	Tea; Katarina	Johanna	Tea; Pia	Katarina; Tea	Katarina; Ira	Katarina; Johanna	Katarina; Johanna	Katarina(+1); Johanna	Johanna; Joni	Nominated	Jonna A Petteri	Jonna A Tommi	Iida; Jonna A	Jonna A Iida	No; Nominations	Fourth place (Day 98)	
Tea	Johanna; Pia	Sarah	Katarina; Janita	Not eligible	Not eligible	Sarah; Tommi	Johanna; Katarina	Johanna(+2); Tomi(+1)	Joni; Tomi	No; Nominations	Jarno; Jonna A	Tomi; Tommi	Tommi; Iida	Jonna A Iida	No; Nominations	Evicted (Day 96)	
Jonna A.	Johanna; Katarina	Nominated	Janita; Pia	Leina; Teija	Not eligible	Iida; Johanna	Iida; Anne	Johanna; Tomi(+1)	Iida; Johanna	No; Nominations	Iida; Tea(+2)	Tomi; Iida	Jouko; Iida	Jouko; Iida	Evicted (Day 91)		
Tommi	Katarina; Tea	Johanna	Tea; Katarina	Katarina; Tea	Ira; Katarina	Katarina; Irina	Katarina; Johanna	Katarina; Johanna	Iida; Jonna I	Nominated	Jonna I Iida	Tea; Iida	Jonna A Iida	Evicted (Day 84)			
Tomi	Sarah; Teija	Sarah	Pia; Janita	Not eligible	Tea; Irina	Katarina; Sarah	Tea(+1); Anne(+2)	Katarina; Tea	Jarno; Tea	Nominated	Petteri; Tea	Teija; Tea	Evicted (Day 77)				
Jarno	Not in House							Katarina; Teija	Jonna I(+1); Joni(+1)	Nominated	Tea; Tommi	Walked (Day 71)					
Jonna I.	Johanna; Katarina	Johanna	Katarina; Janita	Not eligible	Johanna; Iida	Johanna; Iida	Jonna A Johanna(+1)	Johanna; Jonna A(+1)	Johanna; Joni	No; Nominations	Tommi; Petteri	Evicted (Day 70)					
Petteri	Not in House							Katarina; Tea	Joni(+3); Johanna	Nominated	Tea; Tomi	Ejected (Day 69)					
Joni	Not in House							Teija; Katarina	Tea; Iida	Nominated	Jonna I Petteri	Evicted (Day 63)					
Johanna	Jonna A Jonna I	Nominated	Jonna A Jonna I	Not eligible	Teija; Tommi	Tommi; Teija	Anne(+1); Teija(+2)	Teija; Tommi	Teija; Tea	Evicted (Day 56)							
Katarina	Pia; Teija	Iida	Anne; Teija	Not eligible	Not eligible	Sarah; Jonna I	Anne; Tea	Teija; Tea	Evicted (Day 49)								
Anne	Johanna; Katarina	Sarah	Janita; Katarina	Katarina; Tea	Iida; Johanna	Iida; Johanna	Jonna A(+2); Iida(+1)	Evicted (Day 42)									
Sarah	Johanna; Katarina	Nominated	Janita; Teija	Tea; Katarina	Ira; Katarina	Irina; Katarina	Evicted (Day 35)										
Irina	Katarina; Johanna	Johanna	Pia; Katarina	Katarina; Tea	Not eligible	Sarah; Iida	Ejected (Day 33)										
Ira	Sarah; Janita	Sarah	Janita; Pia	Not eligible	Not eligible	Evicted (Day 28)											
Leina	Janita; Katarina	Iida	Katarina; Anne	Not eligible	Evicted (Day 21)												
Janita	Teija; Pia	Sarah	Anne; Jonna A	Walked (Day 17)													
Pia	Tea; Janita	Johanna	Katarina; Tea	Evicted (Day 14)													
Milla	Left (Day 5)																
Notes																	
Up for eviction	Nominations void	Iida; Johanna; Jonna A Sarah; Teija	Anne; Janita; Jonna A Katarina; Pia; Tea	Katarina; Leina; Tea; Teija	Iida; Ira; Irina; Johanna; Katarina	Iida; Johanna; Katarina; Sarah	Anne; Iida; Teija	Johanna; Katarina	Iida; Johanna; Joni; Tea	Jarno; Jouko; Joni; Markus; Petteri; Tomi; Tommi	Jonna A Jonna I ~~Petteri~~; Tea; Tommi	Jonna A Tomi; Tommi	Iida; Jonna A Tommi	Iida; Jonna A	Iida; Jouko; Markus; Tea; Teija	Iida; Jouko; Markus; Teija	
Ejected	none					Irina	none				Petteri	none					
Walked	none			Janita	none							Jarno	none				
Evicted	none	Sarah; 6 of 13 votes to move	Pia; 11.46% to save	Leina; 23.19% to save	Ira; 17.32% to save	Sarah; 23.03% to save	Anne; 26.86% to save	Katarina; 42.80% to save	Johanna; 24.5% to save	Joni; 12.36% to save	Jonna I. 22.35% to save	Tomi; 31.50% to save	Tommi; 28.4% to save	Jonna A. 48.28% to save	Tea; 17.90% to save	Markus; 17.56% (out of 4)	Jouko; 20.01% (out of 3)
Evicted	none	Johanna; 5 of 13 votes to move	Pia; 11.46% to save	Leina; 23.19% to save	Ira; 17.32% to save	Sarah; 23.03% to save	Anne; 26.86% to save	Katarina; 42.80% to save	Johanna; 24.5% to save	Joni; 12.36% to save	Jonna I. 22.35% to save	Tomi; 31.50% to save	Tommi; 28.4% to save	Jonna A. 48.28% to save	Tea; 17.90% to save	Iida; 47.95% (out of 2)	Teija; 52.05% to win
Evicted	none	Iida; 2 of 13 votes to move	Pia; 11.46% to save	Leina; 23.19% to save	Ira; 17.32% to save	Sarah; 23.03% to save	Anne; 26.86% to save	Katarina; 42.80% to save	Johanna; 24.5% to save	Joni; 12.36% to save	Jonna I. 22.35% to save	Tomi; 31.50% to save	Tommi; 28.4% to save	Jonna A. 48.28% to save	Tea; 17.90% to save	Iida; 47.95% (out of 2)	Teija; 52.05% to win

=== Notes ===
- ^1: Any nominations cast did not count. Nominations for Week 1 were randomly decided by Big Brother. The Big Brother Mole, Milla, left the House on Day 5.
- ^2: Male housemates were immune from nominations during their first and second week in the house due to the uneven ratio between males and females.
- ^3: Rather than being evicted, Sarah, Johanna and Lida were fake evicted. They will live in another area of the House in secret for a few days. They were immune from nominations for two weeks.
- ^4: Eviction voting was done in public by housemates.
- ^9: The blue team (Sarah, Jonna A, Tommi, Anne, Markus, Teija and Irina) won the eviction competition and only they could nominate that week.
- ^10: The blue team (Tomi, Markus, Johanna, Iida, Jonna I, Tommi, Sarah and Anne) won the eviction competition and only they could nominate that week.
- ^11: Irina received three extra nomination points as a penalty.
- ^12: Irina was ejected from the house due to medical issues.
- ^13: Tomi, Anne, Iida and Johanna used all three extra points this time and Jonna I used one extra point.
- ^14: The new housemates were able to decide immunity to one female housemate, choosing Iida, meaning she along with the new housemates were immune. Tea used three of her extra nomination points. Teija, Markus and both Jonnas used one point.
- ^15: Petteri used three extra points. Jarno used two extra points and Teija used one extra point.
- ^16: There were no nominations this week. There were "male" and "female" buttons in the house. The buttons were activated for a short period of time, and the buttons pressed first during activation time decided if the males or the females faced eviction that week. Jonna A managed to press the "male" button first so all males are up for eviction.
- ^17: Petteri ejected due breaking rules.
- ^18: Joni was able to give nomination points after his eviction.

== Nomination Totals Received ==
	Week 1	Week 2	Week 3	Week 4	Week 5	Week 6	Week 7	Week 8	Week 9	Week 10	Week 11	Week 12	Week 13	Week 14	FINAL	Total
Teija	4	3	1	2	1	8	7	4	–	0	2	1	3	–	Winner	36
Iida	0	–	–	3	7	8	–	7	–	4	3	6	5	–	Runner-Up	43
Jouko	–	–	–	0	0	0	0	0	–	0	0	2	2	–	3rd Place	4
Markus	–	–	–	0	0	0	0	0	–	0	0	0	0	–	4th Place	0
Tea	7	5	7	2	0	4	3	5	–	8	3	1	1	–	Evicted	46
Jonna A.	2	5	0	0	3	7	5	2	–	6	5	7	7	Evicted		49
Tommi	–	–	–	1	3	0	1	0	–	5	4	4	Evicted			18
Tomi	–	–	–	0	0	1	7	1	–	1	7	Evicted				17
Jarno	Not in House						–	2	–	2	Walked					4
Jonna I.	1	2	0	0	3	1	2	4	–	6	Evicted					19
Petteri	Not in House						–	0	–	6	Ejected					6
Joni	Not in House						–	13	–	Evicted						13
Johanna	11	–	–	3	7	6	11	7	Evicted							45
Katarina	14	15	11	6	7	5	13	Evicted								71
Anne	0	5	0	0	1	9	Evicted									15
Sarah	6	–	–	0	7	Evicted										13
Irina	0	0	0	1+3	3	Ejected										7
Ira	0	0	0	6	Evicted											6
Leina	0	4	2	Evicted												6
Janita	4	17	Walked													21
Pia	5	7	Evicted													12
Milla	Left															N/A

=== Nominations: Results ===
Weeks	Nominated	Evicted
Week 1	Nominations void	None
Week 1	Sarah (6 votes), Johanna (5 votes), Iida (2 votes), Jonna A (0 votes), Teija (0 votes)	Sarah, Johanna, Iida (Fake evict)
Week 2	Jonna A (18.44%), Katarina (17.71%), Tea (17.12%), Janita (16.82%), Anne (16.62%), Pia (11.46%)	Pia
Week 3	Katarina (27.08%), Tea (24.63%), Teija (23.91%), Leina (23.19%)	Janita (Walked), Leina
Week 4	Katarina (21.13%), Irina (19.97%), Iida (19.68%), Johanna (19.15%), Ira (17.32%)	Ira
Week 5	Johanna (28.38%), Iida (24.22%), Katarina (23.76%), Sarah (23.03%)	Irina (Ejected), Sarah
Week 6	Iida (38.99%), Teija (33.73%), Anne (26.86%)	Anne
Week 7	Johanna (53.85%), Katarina (42.8%)	Katarina
Week 8	Iida (25.58%), Tea (24.9%), Joni (24.78%), Johanna (24.5%)	Johanna
Week 9	Markus (16.63%), Tomi (16.17%), Jouko (14.41%), Tommi (14.31%), Jarno (12.86%), Petteri (12.68%), Joni (12.36%)	Joni
Week 10	Jonna A (22.35%), Tea (25.33%), Tommi (23.67%), Jonna I (22.35%)	Petteri (Ejected), Jonna I
Week 11	Jonna A (36.53%), Tommi (31.68%), Tomi (31.5%)	Jarno (Walked), Tomi
Week 12	Iida (36.3%), Jonna A (35.1%), Tommi (28.4%)	Tommi
Week 13	Iida (51.41%), Jonna A (48.28%)	Jonna A
Week 14	Iida (23.35%), Teija (19.96%), Markus (19.79%), Jouko (19.11%), Tea (17.9%)	Tea
FINAL	Teija (32.37%), Iida (31.41%), Jouko (18.67%), Markus (17.56%)	Markus
FINAL	Teija (40.74%), Iida (39.25%), Jouko (20.01%)	Jouko
FINAL	Teija (52.05%), Iida (47.95%)	Iida
