= Big Brother (Finnish TV series) =

- Also known as: Big Brother Suomi (2019–present)
- Genre: Reality
- Created by: John de Mol Jr.
- Written by: Cristal Snow (2019); Vappu Soppela (2019); Lauri Haukkamaa (2019)
- Directed by: Janne Virtanen (2019)
- Presented by: Janni Hussi (2022); Sami Kuronen (2022); Anni Ihamäki (2021–2022); Kimmo Vehviläinen (2019–2021); Tinni Wikström (2021); Elina Kottonen (née Viitanen) (2010–2012, 2019–2020); Alma Hätönen (2019–2020); Mari Sainio (née Kakko) (2005–2006, 2013–2014); Sauli Koskinen (2014); Cristal Snow (2012); Susanna Laine (2010–2011); Vappu Pimiä (2005–2009); Jani Toivola (2009); Janne Kataja (2007–2008)
- Voices of: Jari Karjalainen as "Big Brother"
- Country of origin: Finland
- Original language: Finnish
- No. of seasons: 15

Production
- Producers: Maria Aaltonen (2020–2022); Petteri Ahomaa (2019–2020); Jupe Tuomola (2019); Eveliina Pitkänen (2019); Mikko Räisänen (2006–2014); Jens Helin (2005)
- Running time: 120 min (Big Brother Suomi Live); 90 min (Big Brother); Former: 20 min (Big Brother Extra); 45 min (Big Brother); 70 min (Big Brother Talk Show)
- Production companies: Metronome Film & Television Oy (2005–2010); Endemol Finland Oy (2011–2014); Endemol Shine Finland Oy (2019–2022); Banijay Finland Oy (2026–)

Original release
- Network: Sub
- Release: 28 August 2005 – 14 November 2014
- Network: Nelonen; Jim
- Release: 1 September 2019 – 27 November 2022
- Network: MTV3

Related
- Big Brother (franchise)

Big Brother Suomi (formerly Big Brother) is the Finnish version of the reality television franchise Big Brother. The Finnish adaptation was broadcast on Sub (now known as MTV Sub, and formerly Subtv) in Finland from 2005 to 2014.

The series premiered on Sub on 28 August 2005, and the tenth season concluded on 14 November 2014. Since season 7, the series has been produced by Endemol Finland Oy; the previous seasons were produced by Metronome Film & Television Oy. The season winner wins €50,000. In the tenth season, the winner wins €100,000.

On 5 March 2013, Sub announced that the ninth season would air in the fall of 2013 and would be the first season to feature celebrities as contestants. The ninth season was shorter than the previous season and featured only one host.

On 10 January 2019, Nelonen announced the show would be returned in fall 2019 on Jim, and the series' name was changed to Big Brother Suomi.

In August 2026, it was announced that Big Brother will return to MTV in the autumn of 2026, with a follow-up announcement in September specifying a December premiere.

== Programmes ==
=== Big Brother ===
Big Brother is the name of the daily show. The daily show has been referred to as both "reality" and "pääohjelma" ("main show") by the hosts. From season 1 to 10, it aired every day at 10 pm. On Sundays, it is included in Big Brother Talk Show. On season 11, it was aired on 9.30 pm.

=== Big Brother Talk Show/Live ===
Big Brother Talk Show aired on Sundays during season 1 to 10. It included clips of the Saturday of housemates, clips from the past week, discussion about the show with varying guests (seasons 1–5) and live eviction. The show was hosted by Mari Sainio (seasons 1–2), Vappu Pimiä (seasons 3–5), Susanna Laine (seasons 6–7), Elina Viitanen (seasons 6–8) and again by Sainio (season 9–10).

On season 11, Big Brother Suomi Live aired on Sundays, hosted by Elina Kottonen.

=== Big Brother Extra ===
Big Brother Extra was aired from Monday to Friday during season 1 to 10. Big Brother Sunnuntai Extra was aired on Sundays during the show's sixth season. The viewers could send SMS messages about the show. The host also interviewed Big Brother staff, evicted housemates and other guests. The show was hosted by Vappu Pimiä (seasons 1–2), Janne Kataja (seasons 3–4), Jani Toivola (season 5), Elina Viitanen (seasons 6–7), Cristal Snow (season 8), Mari Sainio (season 9) and Sauli Koskinen (season 10).

== Overview ==
"★" indicates that it is a celebrity season.

Season		Premiere date	Finale date	Housemates	Days	Winner	Hosts	
Sub Iteration (2005–2014)							Big Brother Talk Show	Big Brother Extra
	Big Brother 2005	28 August 2005	1 December 2005	12	96	Perttu Sirviö	Mari Sainio	Vappu Pimiä
	Big Brother 2006	28 August 2006	1 December 2006	18	96	Sari Nygren	Mari Sainio	Vappu Pimiä
	Big Brother 2007	28 August 2007	2 December 2007	20	97	Sauli Koskinen	Vappu Pimiä	Janne Kataja
	Big Brother 2008	26 August 2008	30 November 2008	23	97	Anniina Mustajärvi	Vappu Pimiä	Janne Kataja
	Big Brother 2009	25 August 2009	29 November 2009	22	97	Aso Alanso	Vappu Pimiä	Jani Toivola
	Big Brother 2010	24 August 2010	28 November 2010	28	97	Niko Nousiainen	Susanna Laine; Elina Viitanen	Elina Viitanen
	Big Brother 2011	30 August 2011	11 December 2011	23	104	Janica Kortman	Susanna Laine; Elina Viitanen	Elina Viitanen
	Big Brother 2012	27 August 2012	2 December 2012	22	98	Teija Kurvinen	Elina Viitanen	Cristal Snow
★	Julkkis Big Brother	3 September 2013	13 October 2013	16	41	Jori Kopponen	Mari Sainio	
	Big Brother 2014	24 August 2014	14 November 2014	21	83	Andte Gaup-Juuso	Mari Sainio	Sauli Koskinen
Nelonen Iteration (2019–2022)							Big Brother Suomi Live	Big Brother - Daily Show
	Big Brother 2019	1 September 2019	10 November 2019	14	71	Kristian Heiskari	Elina Kottonen	Kimmo Vehviläinen; Alma Hätönen
	Big Brother 2020	6 September 2020	29 November 2020	20	85	Joel Jämsinen	Elina Kottonen	Kimmo Vehviläinen; Alma Hätönen
★	Big Brother VIP	2 May 2021	20 May 2021	14	19	Petra Maarit Olli	Anni Hautala; Tinni Wikström	Kimmo Vehviläinen
	Big Brother 2021	5 September 2021	28 November 2021	19	85	Jasmiina Yildiz	Elina Kottonen	Kimmo Vehviläinen; Alma Hätönen
	Big Brother 2022	4 September 2022	27 November 2022	21	85	Reeo Tiiainen	Anni Hautala	Janni Hussi; Sami Kuronen
MTV3 Iteration (2026–)								
	Big Brother 2026	27 December 2026						
