= Big Brother (Finnish TV series) season 14 =

Big Brother
- Season 14
- Presented by: Elina Kottonen; Kimmo Vehviläinen; Alma Hätönen
- No. of days: 85
- No. of housemates: 19
- Winner: Jasmiina Yildiz
- Runner-up: Aki Reittu

Release
- Original network: Nelonen
- Original release: 5 September – 28 November 2021

Series chronology
- ← Previous; Big Brother Suomi VIP Next → Big Brother 2022

The fourteenth season of Big Brother Suomi premiered on 5 September 2021 and lasted for 12 weeks. It was aired on Nelonen with a 24/7 live feed on Ruutu.fi streaming service.

Elina Kottonen was the host of the main show. Daily Show was co-hosted by Kimmo Vehviläinen and Alma Hätönen.

The Big Brother house is located at the same place in Vantaa as in the previous VIP season.

== Housemates ==
Housemates	Age on Entry	Occupation	Residence	Day entered	Day exited	Status
Jasmiina Yildiz	24	Practical nurse	Jyväskylä	1	85	Winner
Aki Reittu	27	Forestry machine driver	Lieksa	1	85	Runner-up
Taavi Mets	40	Entrepreneur, Amusement park worker	Helsinki	1	85	Third place
Anssi Huovinen	31	Game Streamer	Utajärvi	1	85	Fourth place
Lasse Suominen	26	Former peacekeeping soldier	Säkylä	1	85	Fifth place
Pekka Koponen	27	Paramedic	Kuopio	1	78	Evicted
Samir Demnati	32	Former military musician, various businesses	Pori	29	76	Evicted
Ville Poutiainen	22	Musician Student	Helsinki	1	74	Evicted
Sami Styrman	29	Entrepreneur	Järvenpää	1	71	Evicted
Melody Pressley	29	Head of kitchen	Helsinki	1	64	Evicted
Juhani Koskinen	37	Farmer	Jalasjärvi	1	57	Evicted
Noora Lappalainen	23	Hairdresser	Helsinki	29	50	Evicted
Maiju Vesa	50	Community educator / Sexual therapist	Kouvola	29	43	Evicted
Katja Lantiainen	35	Master of Business sciences, Master of law	Oulu	1	36	Evicted
Sanni Utriainen	30	Massager	Ylöjärvi	1	36	Evicted
Laura Ronkainen	24	Head of restaurant	Helsinki	1	29	Evicted
Laura Luoto	25	Engineering Student	Helsinki	1	22	Evicted
Minna Autio	42	Entrepreneur	Helsinki	1	15	Evicted
Minna Autio	42	Entrepreneur	Helsinki	50	60	Left
Pippa Najibi	49	Teacher	Espoo	1	8	Evicted

== Nominations table ==
The first housemate in each box was nominated for two points, and the second housemate was nominated for one point.

	Week 1	Week 2	Week 3	Week 4		Week 5	Week 6	Week 7	Week 8	Week 9	Week 10	Week 11			Week 12	
	Week 1	Week 2	Week 3	Public vote to save	House vote to evict	Week 5	Week 6	Week 7	Week 8	Week 9	Week 10	Day 74	Day 76	Day 78	Week 12	
Jasmiina	No nominations	Sanni; Sami	Pekka; Sanni	17.9%	Not eligible	Nominated	Nominated	Juhani; Aki	Juhani(4); Sami(2)	Anssi; Pekka	Sami; Anssi	Nominated	No nominations	Aki; Pekka	Winner (Day 85)	
Aki	Nominated	Laura L Minna	Taavi; Laura L	Top 7	Laura R	No nominations	No nominations	Not eligible	Lasse; Taavi	Melody; Lasse	Taavi; Lasse	No nominations	No nominations	Jasmiina; Taavi	Runner-up (Day 85)	
Taavi	No nominations	Minna; Juhani	Katja; Sami	Top 7	Laura R	No nominations	No nominations	Not eligible	Anssi; Pekka	Anssi; Pekka	Anssi; Pekka	Nominated	Nominated	Pekka; Aki	Third place (Day 85)	
Anssi	Nominated	Sami; Minna	Lasse; Sami	29.9%	Not eligible	No nominations	Nominated	Noora; Taavi	Lasse; Jasmiina	Jasmiina; Lasse	Jasmiina; Lasse	No nominations	Nominated	Jasmiina; Taavi	Fourth place (Day 85)	
Lasse	Immune	Sanni; Anssi	Sanni; Pekka	Top 7	Laura R	No nominations	No nominations	Not eligible	Anssi; Pekka	Anssi; Pekka	Anssi; Pekka	No nominations	Nominated	Aki; Anssi	Fifth place (Day 85)	
Pekka	Nominated	Taavi; Melody	Laura L Sami	Top 7	Laura R	Nominated	Immune	Taavi; Juhani	Juhani; Lasse	Ville; Melody	Ville; Samir	Nominated	No nominations	Taavi; Lasse	Evicted (Day 78)	
Samir	Not in house					No nominations	Nominated	Noora; Juhani	Juhani; Ville	Pekka; Anssi	Ville; Sami	No nominations	Nominated	Evicted (Day 76)		
Ville	Immune	Sami; Taavi	Taavi; Juhani	16.1%	Not eligible	No nominations	Immune	Taavi; Juhani	Juhani; Sami	Taavi; Samir	Aki; Sami	Nominated	Evicted (Day 74)			
Sami	No nominations	Jasmiina; Taavi	Pekka; Jasmiina	Top 7	Melody	Nominated	Nominated	Taavi; Juhani	Pekka; Taavi	Pekka; Jasmiina	Taavi; Jasmiina	Evicted (Day 71)				
Melody	No nominations	Katja; Sami	Sami; Juhani	Bottom 2	Nominated	No nominations	No nominations	Not eligible	Juhani; Sami	Anssi; Aki	Evicted (Day 64)					
Juhani	No nominations	Minna; Laura L	Laura L Pekka	17.2%	Not eligible	No nominations	No nominations	Not eligible	Anssi; Pekka	Evicted (Day 57)						
Noora	Not in house					No nominations	No nominations	Not eligible	Evicted (Day 50)							
Maiju	Not in house					No nominations	Nominated	Evicted (Day 43)								
Katja	No nominations	Sanni; Taavi	Juhani; Taavi	Top 7	Melody	Nominated	Evicted (Day 36)									
Sanni	No nominations	Minna; Lasse	Lasse; Aki	Top 7	Laura R	Nominated	Evicted (Day 36)									
Laura R	Immune	Sanni; Juhani	Sanni; Sami	Bottom 2	Nominated	Evicted (Day 29)										
Laura L	Immune	Minna; Aki	Sami; Jasmiina	Evicted (Day 22)												
Minna	No nominations	Anssi; Pekka	Evicted (Day 15)						Guest	Re-Evicted (Day 60)						
Pippa	Nominated	Evicted (Day 8)														
Notes	1		2	3		4	5	6	7	8		9 10 11	12			
Nominated	Aki; Anssi; Pekka; Pippa	Minna; Sami; Sanni; Taavi	~~Taavi~~; Katja; Laura L Sami; Sanni; Pekka	All Housemates	Laura R Melody	Jasmiina; Katja; Pekka; Sami; Sanni	Anssi; Jasmiina; Maiju; Sami; Samir	Aki; Juhani; Noora; Taavi	Anssi; Juhani; Lasse; Pekka; Sami	Anssi; Jasmiina; Lasse; Melody; Pekka; Taavi; Ville	Anssi; Sami; Taavi; Ville	Jasmiina; Pekka; Taavi; Ville	Anssi; Lasse; Samir; Taavi	Aki; Jasmiina; Pekka; Taavi	Aki; Anssi; Jasmiina; Lasse; Taavi	
Evicted	Pippa; 16.2% (out of 3) to save	Minna; 16% (out of 3) to save	Laura L 30.9% (out of 3) to save	Melody; 14.4% (out of 6) to save	Laura R 5 of 7 votes to evict	Katja; 27.8% Sanni; 28.8% (out of 3) to save	Maiju; 10.8% (out of 3) to save	Noora; 32.5% (out of 3) to save	Juhani; 24.1% (out of 3) to save	Melody; 24.9% (out of 3) to save	Sami; 30.1% (out of 3) to save	Ville; 20.5% (out of 4) to save	Samir; 23.8% (out of 4) to save	Pekka; 46.3% to save	Lasse; Fewest votes (out of 5)	Anssi; Fewest votes (out of 5)
Evicted	Pippa; 16.2% (out of 3) to save	Minna; 16% (out of 3) to save	Laura L 30.9% (out of 3) to save	Laura R 4.5% (out of 6) to save	Laura R 5 of 7 votes to evict	Katja; 27.8% Sanni; 28.8% (out of 3) to save	Maiju; 10.8% (out of 3) to save	Noora; 32.5% (out of 3) to save	Juhani; 24.1% (out of 3) to save	Melody; 24.9% (out of 3) to save	Sami; 30.1% (out of 3) to save	Ville; 20.5% (out of 4) to save	Samir; 23.8% (out of 4) to save	Pekka; 46.3% to save	Taavi; Fewest votes (out of 5)	Aki; 49.9% (out of 2)
Saved	Aki; Most votes (out of 4)	Taavi; Most votes (out of 4)	Pekka; Sami; Most votes (out of 5)	Aki; Katja; Lasse; Pekka; Sami; Sanni; Taavi (out of 13)	Melody; 2 of 7 votes	Jasmiina; Sami; Most votes (out of 5)	Anssi; Jasmiina; Most votes (out of 5)	Taavi; Most votes (out of 4)	Anssi; Lasse; Most votes (out of 5)	Anssi; Jasmiina; Pekka; Taavi; Most votes (out of 7)	Taavi; Most votes (out of 4)	Taavi; 29.5% Pekka; 25.5% Jasmiina; 24.5% (out of 4)	Anssi; 27.3% Taavi; 25% Lasse; 23.9% (out of 4)	Aki; Most votes (out of 4)	Jasmiina; 50.1% to win	
Saved	Aki; Most votes (out of 4)	Taavi; Most votes (out of 4)	Pekka; Sami; Most votes (out of 5)	Aki; Katja; Lasse; Pekka; Sami; Sanni; Taavi (out of 13)	Melody; 2 of 7 votes	Jasmiina; Sami; Most votes (out of 5)	Anssi; Jasmiina; Most votes (out of 5)	Taavi; Most votes (out of 4)	Anssi; Lasse; Most votes (out of 5)	Anssi; Jasmiina; Pekka; Taavi; Most votes (out of 7)	Taavi; Most votes (out of 4)	Taavi; 29.5% Pekka; 25.5% Jasmiina; 24.5% (out of 4)	Anssi; 27.3% Taavi; 25% Lasse; 23.9% (out of 4)	Taavi; Most votes (out of 3)	Jasmiina; 50.1% to win	
Saved	Pekka; 42.4% Anssi; 41.4% (out of 3)	Sanni; 46.1% Sami; 37.9% (out of 3)	Katja; 36.5% Sanni; 32.6% (out of 3)	Anssi; Jasmiina; Juhani; Ville (out of 6)	Melody; 2 of 7 votes	Pekka; 43.4% (out of 3)	Sami; 59.2% Samir; 30% (out of 3)	Juhani; 34% Aki; 33.5% (out of 3)	Pekka; 39.5% Sami; 36.4% (out of 3)	Lasse; 46.4% Ville; 28.7% (out of 3)	Ville; 37.1% Anssi; 32.8% (out of 3)	Taavi; 29.5% Pekka; 25.5% Jasmiina; 24.5% (out of 4)	Anssi; 27.3% Taavi; 25% Lasse; 23.9% (out of 4)	Jasmiina; 53.7% (out of 2)	Jasmiina; 50.1% to win	

=== Notes ===
- ^Note 1: There were no nominations this week. Housemates have divided to four groups by themselves. Housemates decided together which group is safe from nominations. The green group was safe. Later the green team had to decide which group will be nominated this week. They chose the yellow team.
- ^Note 2: Taavi won blinded dance marathon (10h 45min) and saved himself from eviction and put Katja instead.
- ^Note 3: All housemates faced the audience's vote. The Housemates with the most votes were saved, and the bottom 2 faced the vote of the 7 housemates with the most votes from the public.
- ^Note 4: New housemates Maiju, Noora and Samir decided five housemates to be nominated. They were allowed to discuss with each other about the decision. Two housemates were evicted this week.
- ^Note 5: Housemates were divided to two groups having competitions. Blue group won and thus were not nominated for eviction. Anssi won a nomination competition and saved red team members Pekka and Ville.
- ^Note 6: Red/Blue division remains. Only the winning team (red) did nominations.
- ^Note 7: Minna was not able to nominate and she was not able to get nominated, but she gave her nomination points to Jasmiina.
- ^Note 8: Minna's temporary revisiting time ended and she left house at day 60.
- ^Note 9: At week 11 evictions are made on Wednesday, Friday and Sunday.
- ^Note 10: There was time bomb in the house. When it exploded (Monday 2PM) bomb holder (Ville) got nominated.
- ^Note 11: Nomination competitions. Jasmiina, Taavi and Pekka lost and got nominated.
- ^Note 12: Nomination competition. Anssi, Lasse, Samir and Taavi lost and got nominated.

== Nominations points received ==
	Week 1	Week 2	Week 3	Week 4	Week 5	Week 6	Week 7	Week 8	Week 9	Week 10	Week 11	Week 12	Total
Jasmiina	-	2	2	-	-	-	0	1	3	3	4	1st	15
Aki	-	1	1	-	-	-	1	0	1	2	5	2nd	11
Taavi	-	5	5	-	-	-	7	2	2	4	4	3rd	29
Anssi	-	3	0	-	-	-	0	6	9	5	1	4th	24
Lasse	-	1	4	-	-	-	0	5	2	2	1	5th	15
Pekka	-	1	6	-	-	-	0	5	7	2	3	Evicted	24
Samir	Not in the house				-	-	0	0	1	1	Evicted		2
Ville	-	0	0	-	-	-	0	1	2	4	Evicted		7
Sami	-	6	8	-	-	-	0	4	0	4	Evicted		22
Melody	-	1	0	-	-	-	0	0	3	Evicted			4
Juhani	-	2	4	-	-	-	6	12	Evicted				24
Noora	Not in the house				-	-	4	Evicted					4
Maiju	Not in the house				-	-	Evicted						0
Katja	-	2	2	-	-	Evicted							4
Sanni	-	8	5	-	-	Evicted							13
Laura R	-	0	0	-	Evicted								0
Laura L	-	3	5	Evicted									8
Minna	-	10	Evicted					-	Left				10
Pippa	-	Evicted											0
