= Big Brother (Finnish TV series) season 1 =

Big Brother
- Season 1
- Presented by: Mari Sainio
- No. of days: 96
- No. of housemates: 12
- Winner: Perttu Sirviö
- Runner-up: Tiina Arponen
- Companion show: Big Brother Extra

Release
- Original network: Sub
- Original release: 28 August – 1 December 2005

Season chronology
- Next → Big Brother 2006

Big Brother 2005 was the first season of the Finnish reality television season Big Brother. It aired on SubTV in Finland from 28 August 2005 to 1 December 2005.

A number of contestants (known as "housemates") lived in a purpose-built house in Espoo, and were isolated from the rest of the world. Every second week, each housemate nominated two of their peers for eviction, and the housemates (two or more) to receive the most votes would face a public vote. Of these, one would eventually leave, having been "evicted" from the House. However, there sometimes were exceptions to this process as dictated by Big Brother, known as "twists". In the final week, there were four housemates remaining, and the public voted for who they wanted to win. Perttu Sirviö received the most votes, and won the prize money of €50,000.

== Housemates ==
Twelve housemates entered the House at Launch. One housemate (Kathy) decided to leave the House on Day 60.

Housemates	Age	Residence	Day entered	Day exited	Status
Perttu Sirviö	23	Vihti	1	96	Winner
Tiina Arponen	25	Tampere	1	96	Runner-up
Antti Asikainen	26	Helsinki	1	96	3rd Place
Terhi Harmaala	31	Helsinki	1	92	Evicted
Mika Linnamäki	28	Helsinki	1	85	Evicted
Timo Lappalainen	28	Jyväskylä	1	78	Evicted
Minna Kyrkkö	38	Vesilahti	1	64	Evicted
Kathy Koskela	21	Jyväskylä	1	60	Walked
Hanna Toivonen	27	Turku	1	50	Evicted
Iina Heikurainen	27	Espoo	1	35	Evicted
Antti Saastamoinen	23	Lohja	1	22	Evicted
Jani Kyllönen	33	Helsinki	1	8	Evicted

== Nominations table ==
	Week 1	Week 3	Week 5	Week 7	Week 9	Week 11	Week 12	Week 13	Week 14 Final		Nomination points received
Perttu	Antti S. Hanna	Iina; Antti S.	Iina; Minna	Minna; Kathy	Minna; Kathy	Tiina; Timo	Tiina; Terhi	No nominations	Winner (Day 96)		29
Tiina	Kathy; Minna	Antti S. Mika	Minna; Iina	Hanna; Perttu	Timo; Minna	Timo; Perttu	Mika; Perttu	No nominations	Runner-up (Day 96)		19
Antti A.	Tiina; Kathy	Antti S. Kathy	Kathy; Timo	Kathy; Timo	Kathy; Timo	Timo; Terhi	Terhi; Perttu	No nominations	Third place (Day 96)		4
Terhi	Hanna; Jani	Timo; Antti S.	Iina; Minna	Hanna; Minna	Minna; Kathy	Timo; Perttu	Mika; Perttu	No nominations	Evicted (Day 92)		8
Mika	Jani; Terhi	Antti S. Tiina	Hanna; Iina	Kathy; Hanna	Kathy; Timo	Tiina; Timo	Tiina; Perttu	Evicted (Day 85)			5
Timo	Perttu; Terhi	Antti S. Perttu	Kathy; Perttu	Perttu; Minna	Minna; Tiina	Tiina; Terhi	Evicted (Day 78)				20
Minna	Jani; Hanna	Antti S. Perttu	Perttu; Tiina	Perttu; Kathy	Kathy; Timo	Evicted (Day 64)					17
Kathy	Iina; Tiina	Antti S. Tiina	Antti A. Hanna	Hanna; Perttu	Antti A. Timo	Walked (Day 60)					29
Hanna	Perttu; Jani	Antti S. Terhi	Kathy; Perttu	Kathy; Perttu	Evicted (Day 50)						16
Iina	Kathy; Perttu	Antti S. Perttu	Perttu; Tiina	Evicted (Day 36)							10
Antti S.	Timo; Tiina	Hanna; Minna	Evicted (Day 22)								20
Jani	Perttu; Kathy	Evicted (Day 8)									6
Notes	1	none		2	3	none		4			
Against public vote	Perttu, Jani	Antti S., Perttu	Iina, Kathy, Perttu	Kathy, Hanna, Perttu, Timo	~~Kathy,~~; Minna, Timo	Timo, Tiina	Mika, Perttu, Tiina	Antti A., Terhi, Tiina, Perttu	Antti A., Tiina, Perttu		
Walked	none				Kathy	none					
Evicted	Jani; 65% to evict	Antti S. 88% to evict	Iina; 85% to evict	Hanna; 57% to evict	Minna; 69% to evict	Timo; 60% to evict	Mika; 37% to evict	Terhi; 18% to win	Antti A. 29% to win	Tiina; 30% to win	
Evicted	Jani; 65% to evict	Antti S. 88% to evict	Iina; 85% to evict	Hanna; 57% to evict	Minna; 69% to evict	Timo; 60% to evict	Mika; 37% to evict	Terhi; 18% to win	Perttu; 41% to win		

=== Notes ===
- ^Note 1 : Both Kathy and Jani both received six nomination points. They were then forced to draw lots to see who would face eviction. Jani lost, meaning she would face the first public vote along with Perttu
- ^Note 2 : Big Brother punished Timo for discussing nominations by putting him up for eviction with the nominated housemates.
- ^Note 3 : Following Kathy's departure, Timo, who received the next highest number of nomination points, was put up for eviction with Minna.
- ^Note 4 : There were no nominations in the final week and the public were voting for which Housemates they wanted to win, rather than to evict.

=== Nominations: Results ===
Weeks	Nominated	Evicted
Week 1	Jani (65%), Perttu (35%)	Jani
Week 3	Antti S. (88%), Perttu (12%)	Antti S.
Week 5	Iina (85%), Kathy (12%), Perttu (3%)	Iina
Week 7	Hanna (57%), Timo (28%), Kathy (12%), Perttu (3%)	Hanna
Week 9	Minna (69%), Timo (31%), ~~Kathy (%)~~	Kathy (Walked) & Minna
Week 11	Timo (60%), Tiina (40%)	Timo
Week 12	Mika (37%), Tiina (33%), Perttu (30%)	Mika
Week 13	?? (36%), ?? (26%), ?? (20%), Terhi (18%)	Terhi
Week 14	Perttu (41%), Tiina (30%), Antti A. (29%)	Tiina & Antti A.
