= Big Brother (Finnish TV series) season 12 =

Big Brother
- Season 12
- Presented by: Elina Kottonen; Kimmo Vehviläinen; Alma Hätönen
- No. of days: 85
- No. of housemates: 20
- Winner: Joel Jämsinen
- Runner-up: Kristiina Jönkkäri
- No. of episodes: 85

Release
- Original network: Nelonen
- Original release: 6 September – 29 November 2020

Series chronology
- ← Previous; Big Brother 2019 Next → Big Brother Suomi VIP

The twelfth season of Big Brother Suomi premiered on 6 September 2020 and was aired on Nelonen. This season was longer than the eleventh season and ran for 12 weeks.

Elina Kottonen returned to host the main show. Daily Show was co-hosted by Kimmo Vehviläinen and Alma Hätönen.

Due to the COVID-19 pandemic, all of the official housemates must test negative for COVID-19 twice before entering the house. Housemates directly entered the house on their own without being introduced one by one at the studio during the live launch show. Each live show on Sunday featured a small live studio audience that is sitting loosely while wearing face masks.

The house this year is designed by Aalto University's space design students.

== Housemates ==
Housemates	Age on Entry	Occupation	Residence	Day entered	Day exited	Status
Joel Jämsinen	25	Landscaping worker	Jyväskylä	1	85	Winner
Kristiina Jönkkäri	21	Electrician	Vantaa	1	85	Runner-up
Arttu Liimatainen	26	Production engineer	Oulu	1	85	3rd Place
Paula Lujala	40	Personal trainer	Pori	1	85	4th Place
Olli-Pekka Parviainen	27	Garbage truck driver	Vantaa	1	84	Evicted
Julia Willman	23	Supermarket staff	Hyvinkää	43	83	Evicted
Vili Haara	27	Bar owner	Tampere	43	78	Evicted
Marko Karonen	34	Entrepreneur	Säkylä	1	71	Evicted
Timo Paasikunnas	53	Zookeeper	Loviisa	1	64	Evicted
Ella Toivainen	23	Café shop staff	Helsinki	1	57	Evicted
Nona Korkiakoski	37	Bartender	Kittilä	43	50	Evicted
Marjatta Aarnio	72	Retired secretary	Helsinki	43	50	Evicted
Sami Ronkola	27	Preschool teacher	Kerava	1	43	Evicted
Kati Sirkola	32	Crossfit coach, personal trainer and bartender	Vaasa	1	43	Evicted
Roope Niemi	22	Cinema staff	Espoo	1	36	Evicted
Sasa Kasemets	26	HR coordinator	Turku	1	29	Evicted
Niko Seyyedi	25	Homemaker	Espoo	1	22	Evicted
Minna Pesonen	39	Verger	Varkaus	1	15	Evicted
Sini Liljeqvist	33	Deputy judge and lawyer	Pori	1	9	Walked
Tiia Viinikainen	41	University teacher	Veikkola	1	8	Evicted

== Effect by the evicted housemate ==
During this season, the evicted housemate still got the chance to influence the house.

Week	Evicted housemate	Effect	Given to
2	Tiia	Choose a resident who moves from the Summer Cottage to the Main House.	Marko
3	Minna	Choose a resident transfer to the animal side.	Ella
4	Niko	Different tasks on a weekly task.	Sami
5	Sasa	Cannot enter the kitchen anymore.	Kati
6	Roope	Must work as house's sleeping fairy, covering housemates up with the sleeping blanket, tell bedtime stories to others, etc.	Marko
7	Kati and Sami	Serves as B&B's official waitress and chef.	Arttu and Olli-Pekka
8	Nona and Marjatta	Found the third party.	Joel and Paula
9	Ella	Must work as house's personal knitting coach to other housemates.	Timo
10	Timo	Work as the producer of the Vintage Tube studio.	Arttu
11	Marko	Become the captain of the pirate ship.	Kristiina
12	Vili	Work as Santa's reindeer.	Paula

== House division ==
On launch night, it was revealed by the host that half of the housemates would not enter the Big Brother House, instead, they entered the BB Summer Cottage. The BB Summer Cottage is located in the task area on the roof of the Big Brother House. Both areas were merged since the end of the weekly task of Week 3.

	Week 1	Week 2	Week 3	Merged
Arttu	Main House		Farmer	Merged
Ella	Main House		Animal	Merged
Joel	Main House		Farmer	Merged
Kati	Main House		Farmer	Merged
Kristiina	Summer Cottage		Animal	Merged
Marko	Summer Cottage	Main House	Farmer	Merged
Niko	Summer Cottage		Animal	Merged
Olli-Pekka	Summer Cottage		Animal	Merged
Paula	Summer Cottage		Animal	Merged
Roope	Summer Cottage		Animal	Merged
Sami	Summer Cottage		Animal	Merged
Sasa	Main House		Farmer	Merged
Timo	Main House		Farmer	Merged
Minna	Main House	Summer Cottage		Merged
Sini	Main House			Merged
Tiia	Summer Cottage			Merged

== Nominations table ==
The first housemate in each box was nominated for two points, and the second housemate was nominated for one point.

	Week 1	Week 2	Week 3	Week 4	Week 5	Week 6	Week 7	Week 8	Week 9	Week 10	Week 11			Week 12			
	Week 1	Week 2	Week 3	Week 4	Week 5	Week 6	Week 7	Week 8	Week 9	Week 10	Fake nominations	Public nomination	House vote	Day 83	Day 84	Final	
Joel	Sini; Ella	Exempt	Sami; Olli-Pekka	Sasa; Paula	Sami; Ella	No nominations	No nominations	Paula; Ella	Paula; Vili	Paula; Vili	Arttu; Olli-Pekka	Not eligible	Vili	No nominations	No nominations	Winner (Day 85)	
Kristiina	Olli-Pekka; Marko	Sami; Minna	Roope; Joel	Roope; Ella	Olli-Pekka; Marko	No nominations	No nominations	Paula; Marko	Marko; Paula	Marko; Vili	Julia; Joel	Not eligible	Vili	No nominations	No nominations	Runner-Up (Day 85)	
Arttu	Ella; Minna	Exempt	Roope; Sami	Roope; Marko	Roope; Marko	No nominations	No nominations	Marko; Timo	Vili; Marko	Marko; Julia	Joel; Olli-Pekka	Not eligible	Vili	No nominations	No nominations	Third place (Day 85)	
Paula	Tiia; Kristiina	Minna; Kristiina	Niko; Kristiina	Kristiina; Sasa	Timo; Joel	No nominations	No nominations	Kristiina; Timo	Julia; Kristiina	Julia; Kristiina	Arttu; Kristiina	Not eligible	Nominated	No nominations	No nominations	Fourth place (Day 85)	
Olli-Pekka	Tiia; Kristiina	Minna; Kristiina	Kristiina; Marko	Ella; Sami	Sami; Joel	No nominations	No nominations	Ella; Paula	Kristiina; Timo	Kristiina; Vili	Joel; Arttu	Not eligible	Vili	No nominations	No nominations	Evicted (Day 84)	
Julia	Not in House						Nominated	Paula; Ella	Paula; Arttu	Vili; Paula	Kristiina; Joel	Not eligible	Vili	No nominations	Evicted (Day 83)		
Vili	Not in House						Nominated	Ella; Kristiina	Timo; Joel	Joel; Marko	Paula; Arttu	Not eligible	Nominated	Evicted (Day 78)			
Marko	Tiia; Niko	Exempt	Ella; Olli-Pekka	Kristiina; Arttu	Timo; Arttu	No nominations	No nominations	Paula; Ella	Arttu; Vili	Arttu; Vili	Evicted (Day 71)						
Timo	Minna; Sasa	Exempt	Marko; Sasa	Sasa; Marko	Marko; Paula	No nominations	No nominations	Paula; Ella	Vili; Paula	Evicted (Day 64)							
Ella	Minna; Joel	Exempt	Sami; Marko	Sami; Kristiina	Kristiina; Timo	No nominations	No nominations	Marko; Olli-Pekka	Evicted (Day 57)								
Nona	Not in House						Nominated	Evicted (Day 50)									
Marjatta	Not in House						Nominated	Evicted (Day 50)									
Sami	Kristiina; Roope	Minna; Niko	Niko; Timo	Roope; Ella	Roope; Kristiina	No nominations	Evicted (Day 43)										
Kati	Minna; Arttu	Exempt	Kristiina; Sami	Kristiina; Sasa	Kristiina; Sami	No nominations	Evicted (Day 43)										
Roope	Tiia; Sami	Sami; Minna	Sami; Kristiina	Arttu; Kristiina	Sami; Kristiina	Evicted (Day 36)											
Sasa	Minna; Timo	Exempt	Sami; Kristiina	Timo; Sami	Evicted (Day 29)												
Niko	Tiia; Paula	Sami; Paula	Paula; Sami	Evicted (Day 22)													
Minna	Sini; Kati	Sami; Paula	Evicted (Day 15)														
Sini	Minna; Joel	Walked (Day 9)															
Tiia	Sami; Marko	Evicted (Day 8)															
Rescue points	none			Kristiina (-2)	Kristiina (-2)	none		Marko (-2)	Marko (-2)	Marko (-2)	none						
Notes	1, 2	3, 4	none	5	5	6	7	8, 9	9	9	10, 11			12			
Nominated for eviction	Minna; Tiia	Minna; Sami	Kristiina; Marko; Niko; Roope; Sami	Kristiina; Roope; Sasa	Kristiina; Marko; Roope; Sami; Timo	All Housemates	Julia; Marjatta; Nona; Vili	Ella; Paula	Arttu; Kristiina; Paula; Timo; Vili	Julia; Kristiina; Marko; Paula; Vili	none		Paula; Vili	Arttu; Joel; Julia; Kristiina; Olli-Pekka; Paula			
Walked	none	Sini	none														
Evicted	Tiia; 12.1% to save	Minna; 49.5% to save	Niko; 16.6% to save	Sasa; 31.7% to save	Roope; 18.0% to save	Kati; 25.8% to evict	Marjatta; 8.9% to save	Ella; 26% to save	Timo; 18.9% to save	Marko; 18.9% to save	none	Vili; 31.5% to nominate	Vili; 5 of 5 votes to evict	Julia; 11.7% to win	Olli-Pekka; 18.0% to win	Paula; 19% (out of 4)	Arttu; 22.1% (out of 3)
Evicted	Minna; Fake evict to move	Minna; 49.5% to save	Niko; 16.6% to save	Sasa; 31.7% to save	Roope; 18.0% to save	Sami; 25.3% to evict	Nona; 29.7% to save	Ella; 26% to save	Timo; 18.9% to save	Marko; 18.9% to save	none	Paula; 24.1% to nominate	Vili; 5 of 5 votes to evict	Julia; 11.7% to win	Olli-Pekka; 18.0% to win	Kristiina; 33.8% (out of 2)	
Saved	Minna; 87.9% to save	Sami; 50.5% to save	Marko; 22.9% Roope; 22.9% Kristiina; 19.2% Sami; 18.4% to save	Roope; 34.5% Kristiina; 33.8% to save	Marko; 21.9% Timo; 21.4% Kristiina; 20.6% Sami; 18.1% to save	Ella; 25.1% Arttu; 14.8% Kristiina; 4.4% Paula; 2.1% Olli-Pekka; 1.7% Marko; 0.4% Joel; 0.3% Timo; 0.1% to evict	Julia; 29.8% Vili; 31.6% to save	Paula; 74% to save	Kristiina; 22.0% Paula; 20.3% Vili; 19.7% Arttu; 19.1% to save	Kristiina; 22.3% Vili; 19.8% Paula; 19.6% Julia; 19.4% to save	none	Arttu; 24.0% Kristiina; 9.8% Olli-Pekka; 7.9% Julia; 1.9% Joel; 0.8% to nominate	Paula; 0 of 5 votes to evict	Olli-Pekka; 21.2% Joel; 20.0% Kristiina; 18.1% Paula; 16.5% Arttu; 12.5% to win	Kristiina; 22.9% Joel; 21.8% Arttu; 19.0% Paula; 18.3% to win	Joel; 66.2% to win	

=== Notes ===
- ^Note 1: Big Brother split the housemates into two groups, with one group staying in the Main House and the other in the Summer Cottage. They could only vote for housemates in their own group. Only one housemate from each area would be nominated.
- ^Note 2: After Tiia was evicted, Minna was fake evicted from the Main House and transferred to the BB Summer Cottage without the knowledge of the Main House housemates.
- ^Note 3: Sini left the house on Day 9 for personal reasons.
- ^Note 4: The Cottage lost the final performance of the duel-weekly mission and the Main House received protection from nominations.
- ^Note 5: The viewers voted for Kristiina to receive two rescue points. The rescue points are deducted from the total nomination points.
- ^Note 6: All housemates were up for eviction and two housemates would be evicted.
- ^Note 7: Only new housemates were up for eviction. Two of them would be evicted.
- ^Note 8: Julia and Vili were immune from the eviction as they are new housemates.
- ^Note 9: The viewers voted for Marko to receive two rescue points. The rescue points are deducted from the total nomination points.
- ^Note 10: This week, the nomination was up to the viewers. The two housemates who received the most votes are up for eviction. Then, housemates cast their votes on which one of them to leave.
- ^Note 11: Fake nominations took place in the house. This time, housemates voted for who they wanted to stay.
- ^Note 12: For the final week, the public were voting to win rather than to save. The housemate who received the fewest votes to win would be evicted on Friday, and the next housemate with the fewest votes to win would be evicted on Saturday.

== Nominations points received ==
	Week 1	Week 2	Week 3	Week 4	Week 5	Week 6	Week 7	Week 8	Week 9	Week 10	Week 11	Week 12	Total
Joel	2	-	1	0	2	-	-	0	1	2	(-6)	Winner	8
Kristiina	4	2	7	6 (8-2)	4 (6-2)	-	-	3	3	3	(-3)	Runner-up	32
Arttu	1	-	0	3	1	-	-	0	3	2	(-6)	3rd Place	10
Paula	1	2	2	1	1	-	-	11	6	3	(-2)	4th Place	37
Olli-Pekka	2	0	2	0	2	-	-	1	0	0	(-2)	Evicted	7
Julia	Not in House						-	-	2	3	(-2)	Evicted	5
Vili	Not in House						-	-	6	6	(0)	Evicted	12
Marko	2	-	4	2	4	-	-	3 (5-2)	1 (3-2)	3 (5-2)	Evicted		19
Timo	1	-	1	2	5	-	-	2	3	Evicted			14
Ella	3	-	2	4	1	-	-	8	Evicted				18
Nona	Not in House						-	Evicted					0
Marjatta	Not in House						-	Evicted					0
Kati	1	-	0	0	0	-	Evicted						1
Sami	3	8	11	4	7	-	Evicted						33
Roope	1	0	4	6	4	Evicted							15
Sasa	1	-	1	6	Evicted								8
Niko	1	1	4	Evicted									6
Minna	11	8	Evicted										19
Sini	4	Walked											4
Tiia	10	Evicted											10
