= Sauli Koskinen =

Finnish television host and reporter

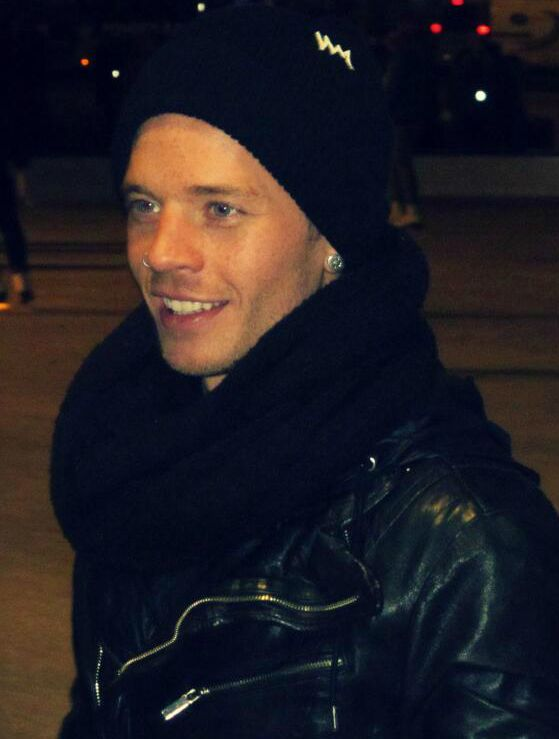
- Koskinen in Helsinki, November 2013
- Born: 28 March 1985 (age 41); Hyvinkää, Finland
- Occupations: Television host; entertainment reporter; reality-television star; radio personality; model
- Years active: 2007–present
- Website: saulikoskinen.net (in Finnish)

Sauli Eerik Koskinen (born 28 March 1985) is a Finnish television host and entertainment reporter from Hyvinkää, Finland.

He was the host of Saulin Paras Kaveri lifestyle show, which aired on Fox Finland.

== Career ==
=== Big Brother ===
Koskinen was the winner of Big Brother 2007, beating out nineteen other contestants in a public vote over a fourteen-week period. Before applying for the show, Koskinen worked as a clerk in a Helsinki clothing store. Mikko Räisänen, the casting director for Big Brother, has stated that the decision to put Koskinen in the Big Brother house was made within the first two minutes of his casting interview, crediting Koskinen's positivity, likability and openness.

=== Post Big Brother ===
In 2008, fans petitioned to have Koskinen and fellow Big Brother contestant Niko Nousiainen make a return to television. The campaign resulted in the television show Sauli and Niko’s Best Clips, in which Koskinen and Nousiainen provided commentary on viral videos.

=== Work in Finnish media ===
Shortly thereafter, Koskinen was hired as a web-based entertainment reporter for the Finnish tabloid Ilta-Sanomat, where he provided commentary on entertainment news in weekly Tutka shows with co-host Katri Utula.

As of June 2011, Koskinen continued to work for Ilta-Sanomat and was additionally hired as a U.S.-based call-in entertainment reporter for the Finnish radio station Radio Aalto. In 2011, Koskinen and Utula traveled to the United States to produce a special version of their weekly web series entitled Tutka Roadshow.

In 2012 Koskinen continued to work for Ilta-Sanomat as a blogger and as the host of Tutka. New special Tutka Roadshow was produced during summer 2012 when Koskinen and Utula traveled in southern Finland meeting Finnish celebrities. In 2013 Sauli Koskinen started video blogging from Los Angeles for Finnish entertainment magazine 7 päivää.

In May 2012 Koskinen hosted Näytös 2012 fashion show that was aired live on Finnish national TV channel Yle Teema.

In December 2013 Laila Snellman announced that Koskinen had been signed by her modeling agency Paparazzi. He will be available for work as an announcer, actor, and model.

=== Saulin Paras Kaveri ===
On 28 February 2013 Fox Finland announced that Sauli Koskinen will start hosting his own television lifestyle show, Saulin Paras Kaveri. The show was shot in Los Angeles during spring 2013. In the show Koskinen meets Finnish celebrities living in Los Angeles area. The first episode aired on channel FOX Finland on 14 September 2013; the show's guests include such celebrities as model Suvi Koponen and chef Stefan Richter.

=== Dancing on Ice Finland ===
Koskinen is the winner of the first season of Nelonen's Dancing on Ice TV show. On 21 August 2013 it was announced that Koskinen would participate in the Finnish version of Dancing on Ice where ten celebrities learn to ice skate with a professional partner. Koskinen was partnered with synchronized skater Nea Ojala. After the announcement of the celebrity contestants and star coaches, the teams had five weeks to prepare for the first live show. The competition started on 28 September and the finale was held on 30 November 2013. Koskinen and Ojala won the competition.

Week	Song	Judges' score				Result
Week	Song	Mila	Mika	Anuliisa	Guest Judge	Result
1	”Maailman toisella puolen” by Haloo Helsinki!	7	6	6	7	Safe
2	”Aamu” by Pepe Willberg	7	6.5	7	7	Safe
3	”Drink Up Me Hearties” by Hans Zimmer	7.5	8	8	9	Safe
4	”Wannabe” by Spice Girls	8	8	8	8	Safe
5	”Jai Ho” by The Pussycat Dolls	8.5	8.5	9	8.5	Safe
6	”It’s My Life” by Bon Jovi	8.5	9	8.5	9	Safe
7	”All That Jazz” from Chicago	9	9	8	8.5	Safe
8	”Vogue” by Madonna ”Minä ja Hän” by Jenni Vartiainen	9; 9	8.5; 9	9; 9	8.5; 10	Safe
9	”Feeling Good” by Muse ”Nuori ja Kaunis” by Anna Järvinen	8.5; 9	8.5; 9.5	8.5; 9.5	10; 9	Safe
10	”Show Me How You Burlesque” by Christina Aguilera ”Drink Up Me Hearties” by Hans Zimmer ”Sun Särkyä Anna Mä En” by Johanna Kurkela	10; 9.5; 10	10; 9.5; 10	10; 10; 10	10; 10; 10	Won

== Personal life ==
Koskinen was in a relationship with American singer Adam Lambert beginning in November 2010. In April 2013, Koskinen and Lambert gave similar interviews in which they announced they had split up amicably and expected to remain friends.
