= Big Brother (Finnish TV series) season 2 =

Big Brother
- Season 2
- Presented by: Mari Sainio
- No. of days: 96
- No. of housemates: 18
- Winner: Sari Nygren
- Runner-up: Kari Hautoniemi
- Companion show: Big Brother Extra

Release
- Original network: Sub
- Original release: 28 August – 1 December 2006

Season chronology
- ← Previous; Big Brother 2005 Next → Big Brother 2007

Big Brother 2006 was the second season of the Finnish reality television season Big Brother. It aired on SubTV in Finland, from 29 August 2006 to 1 December 2006, and lasted 96 days. A number of contestants (known as "housemates") lived in a purpose-built house in Espoo, and were isolated from the rest of the world. Each week, each housemate nominated two of their peers for eviction, and the housemates who received the most nominations would face a public vote. Of these, one would eventually leave, having been "evicted" from the house. However, there sometimes were exceptions to this process as dictated by Big Brother, known as "twists". In the final week, there were four housemates remaining, and the public voted for who they wanted to win. Sari Nygren received the most votes, and won the prize money of €50,000. The series's final broadcast obtained a peak audience of 540,000 viewers.

== Housemates ==
Twelve housemates entered the house at Launch. Sari was the twelfth housemate, chosen by the public, to enter the house. Six other housemates entered the house during the season, creating a total of eighteen housemates competing in Big Brother 2006. One of these six housemates was a replacement housemate Sorella, who was introduced to the housemates on Day 21, after the departure of Henri. On Day 36, five more housemates (Olli, Piritta, Jani, Mia, Jaakko) entered the house, totaling 18 housemates. Two housemates (Heidi and Mika) were ejected from the house. On Day 84, it was revealed that an old housemate would re-enter the house on the following week. Jenni, Kaarlo and Mira received the most votes in the first round, so the final vote was between the three of them. After receiving 43,8% of all votes, Kaarlo became eligible to win the prize money and re-entered the house on Day 91.

Housemates	Age	Residence	Day entered	Day exited	Status
Sari Nygren	33	Kokkola	1	96	Winner
Kari Hautoniemi	33	Turku	1	96	Runner-up
Kaarlo Nisso	22	Tampere	91	96	3rd Place
Kaarlo Nisso	22	Tampere	1	42	Evicted
Olli Paloheimo	22	Espoo	36	96	4th Place
Hanne Talola	27	Helsinki	1	91	Evicted
Jani Raivio	27	Kouvola	36	84	Evicted
Mia Reijonen	31	Helsinki	36	77	Evicted
Mira Kansanniva	28	Helsinki	1	70	Evicted
Jenni Kovanen	28	Tampere	1	63	Evicted
Piritta Sorvali	28	Helsinki	36	56	Evicted
Jaakko Salmi	24	Helsinki/Turku	36	49	Evicted
Sorella Johansson	30	Espoo	21	35	Evicted
Mika Sivén	25	Helsinki	1	30	Ejected
Tatu Kosonen	31	Helsinki	1	28	Evicted
Henri Petro	27	Tampere	1	21	Evicted
Heidi Aspegren	23	Helsinki	1	16	Ejected
Ari Soidinmäki	29	Soini	1	14	Evicted
Mirka Rikman	29	Helsinki	1	7	Evicted

== Voting format ==
In the 2005 season of Big Brother Suomi, viewers could only vote to evict the nominated housemates they wanted to leave the house. Big Brother 2006 added the save vote. Any viewer may cast as many evict or save votes as they choose. Prior to eviction each housemates' evict votes were merged with their save votes; the housemate with the lowest number of save votes remaining after the merge is evicted.

== Alleged sexual abuse controversy ==
On September 26, Mika was removed from the house for the alleged attempt to sexually abuse a fellow female housemate, Sorella. After a party, on Day 25, Sorella and Mika ended up in the same bed at the end of the night. After Sorella had, seemingly, passed out, Mika tried to lower her jeans and finger her. Big Brother stopped Mika by ordering him to come to the Diary Room, and later, the incident had undergone police investigation.

== Nominations table ==
The first housemate listed in each cell is nominated for two points, while the second housemate listed is nominated for one point.

	Week 1	Week 2	Week 3	Week 4	Week 5	Week 6	Week 7	Week 8	Week 9	Week 10	Week 11	Week 12	Week 13	Week 14 Final		Nomination points received
Sari	Heidi; Tatu	Mira; Mika	Henri; Tatu	Tatu; Mika	Sorella; Jenni	Nominated	Jaakko; Piritta	Piritta; Jani	Jenni; Mira	Jani; Mira	Jani; Mia	Jani; Olli	Hanne; Olli	Winner (Day 96)		26
Kari	Mika; Mirka	Hanne; Sari	Henri; Sari	Tatu; Kaarlo	Sorella; Mira	No nominations	Mia; Hanne	Mira; Hanne	Mia; Mira	Mira; Sari	Mia; Hanne	Olli; Sari	Hanne; Olli	Runner-up (Day 96)		27
Kaarlo	Mika; Heidi	Ari; Henri	Mira; Henri	Mira; Kari	Mira; Sorella	Nominated	Evicted (Day 42)							Third place (Day 96)		5
Olli	Not in House					No nominations	Jaakko; Jenni	Mia; Piritta	Jenni; Mia	Mira; Sari	Mira; Sari	Sari; Jani	Sari; Hanne	Fourth place (Day 96)		7
Hanne	Mirka; Heidi	Mika; Mira	Henri; Kari	Tatu; Kari	Sorella; Sari	No nominations	Mia; Mira	Mia; Mira	Mira; Mia	Kari; Mira	Kari; Mia	Kari; Jani	Kari; Sari	Evicted (Day 91)		19
Jani	Not in House					No nominations	Mia; Piritta	Mia; Piritta	Mia; Jenni	Sari; Mira	Mia; Sari	Sari; Kari	Evicted (Day 84)			20
Mia	Not in House					No nominations	Jaakko; Jenni	Mira; Jani	Jani; Mira	Kari; Jani	Jani; Olli	Evicted (Day 77)				33
Mira	Kari; Sari	Heidi; Mika	Henri; Mika	Jenni; Kaarlo	Kaarlo; Sorella	No nominations	Mia; Piritta	Kari; Hanne	Jenni; Hanne	Jani; Kari	Evicted (Day 70)					45
Jenni	Mira; Mirka	Ari; Heidi	Henri; Mira	Tatu; Mira	Sorella; Kari	No nominations	Mia; Kari	Mira; Mia	Mira; Kari	Evicted (Day 63)						17
Piritta	Not in House					No nominations	Jaakko; Jani	Jani; Kari	Evicted (Day 56)							10
Jaakko	Not in House					No nominations	Mia; Olli	Evicted (Day 49)								8
Sorella	Not in House			Sari; Hanne	Jenni; Kaarlo	Evicted (Day 35)										9
Mika	Mirka; Kari	Ari; Mira	Mira; Henri	Mira; Tatu	Ejected (Day 30)											15
Tatu	Heidi; Sari	Heidi; Henri	Sari; Henri	Jenni; Mika	Evicted (Day 28)											11
Henri	Ari; Hanne	Ari; Hanne	Mira; Kari	Evicted (Day 21)												16
Heidi	Sari; Ari	Mira; Hanne	Ejected (Day 16)													12
Ari	Mike; Heidi	Mika; Henry	Evicted (Day 14)													11
Mirka	Kari; Sari	Evicted (Day 7)														6
Note	none			1	none	2	none	3	none	4	none		5	6		
Against public vote	Heidi, Mika, Mirka	Ari, Mika, Mira	Henri, Mira	Mira, Tatu	Jenni, Sorella	Kaarlo, Sari	Jaakko, Mia	Mia, Mira, Piritta	Jenni, Mira	Jani, Kari, Mira	Jani, Mia	Jani, Sari	Hanne, Sari	Kaarlo, Kari, Olli, Sari		
Ejected	none		Heidi	none	Mika	none										
Evicted	Mirka; Most votes to evict	Ari -7.61% to evict	Henri -41.58% to evict	Tatu -8.14% to evict	Sorella -38.26% to evict	Kaarlo -17.86% to evict	Jaakko -28.69% to evict	Piritta -9.32% to evict	Jenni -13.20% to evict	Mira -9.68% to evict	Mia -29.09% to evict	Jani -16.15% to evict	Hanne -4.79% to evict	Olli; 2.50% (out of 4)	Kaarlo; 11.54% (out of 3)	
Evicted	Mirka; Most votes to evict	Ari -7.61% to evict	Henri -41.58% to evict	Tatu -8.14% to evict	Sorella -38.26% to evict	Kaarlo -17.86% to evict	Jaakko -28.69% to evict	Piritta -9.32% to evict	Jenni -13.20% to evict	Mira -9.68% to evict	Mia -29.09% to evict	Jani -16.15% to evict	Kaarlo; 43.8% (out of 3) to return	Kari; 24.27% (out of 2)	Sari; 61.69% to win	

=== Notes ===
- ^Note 1 : As a new housemate, Sorella could nominate but could not be nominated by her fellow housemates.
- ^Note 2 : As punishment for Kaarlo and Sari breaking multiple house rules, nominations were cancelled, and both were automatically nominated by Big Brother.
- ^Note 3 : As punishment for attempting to talk in code, Hanne and Piritta were given 3 nomination points by Big Brother. Had this not happened, only Mia and Mira would have faced the public vote.
- ^Note 4 : This week, Mia won immunity through a dance competition task on Day 64. She could nominate, but could not be nominated by her fellow housemates.
- ^Note 5 : On Day 86, the public was given the opportunity to vote one of the evicted housemates back into the house, making them eligible to win. The evicted housemates participating in this vote were Ari, Henri, Jenni, Kaarlo, Mia, Mira, Mirka and Tatu. Jani, Jaakko, Piritta and Sorella did not participate in the vote. On Day 87, it was revealed that Jenni, Kaarlo and Mira received the most votes to return and would move on to the second round of the vote. On Day 91, it was revealed that Kaarlo had received the most votes to return. He entered the house shortly after Hanne's eviction.
- ^Note 6 : Following Kaarlo's re-entry into the house, the lines opened for the public to vote for a winner.
