= Big Brother (Finnish TV series) season 11 =

Big Brother
- Season 11
- Presented by: Elina Kottonen; Kimmo Vehviläinen; Alma Hätönen
- No. of days: 71
- No. of contestants: 14
- Winner: Kristian Heiskari
- Runner-up: Kevin Koho
- No. of episodes: 71

Release
- Original network: Jim; Nelonen
- Original release: 1 September – 10 November 2019

Series chronology
- ← Previous; Big Brother 2014 Next → Big Brother 2020

The eleventh season of Big Brother Suomi premiered on 1 September 2019 and was aired on Jim and Nelonen. This is the first season to air on Jim and Nelonen after the first ten seasons aired on Sub from 2005–2014. After a five-year hiatus, the revival of Big Brother Suomi was announced on 14 January 2019 alongside the revival of the Polish edition of Big Brother.

On 9 July 2019, it was announced Elina Kottonen returned to host the main show. Daily Show co-host by Kimmo Vehviläinen and Alma Hätönen.

For this season, the Big Brother house is located next to the shopping centre Redi in Kalasatama, Helsinki. The house is designed by Finnish architect, environmental artist Marco Casagrande.

== Housemates ==
Housemates	Age on Entry	Occupation	Residence	Day entered	Day exited	Status
Kristian Heiskari	27	Laborer	Helsinki	1	71	Winner
Kevin Koho	20	Salesperson	Helsinki	1	71	Runner-up
Helmeri Pirinen	32	Professional Athlete	Helsinki	1	71	3rd Place
Anu Puumalainen	31	Real Estate Agent	Hyvinkää	1	71	4th Place
Kimmo Eloranta	32	Air Traffic Controller	Vantaa	1	71	5th Place
Ville Turkkinen	38	Charity Worker	Hämeenlinna	1	64	Evicted
Jukka Laine	24	Machinist	Lappajärvi	1	57	Evicted
Milla Lehtonen	24	Dancer	Jyväskylä	1	50	Evicted
Mira Ojala	30	Bartender	Rauma	1	43	Evicted
Tuula Rantala	54	Kindergarten Teacher	Tampere	1	36	Evicted
Tarina Rauteenmaa	23	Student	Tampere	1	29	Evicted
Eeva-Leena Keskinen	30	Unemployed	Turku	1	22	Evicted
Timo Kuisma	52	Entrepreneur	Espoo	1	15	Evicted
Emma Hildén	29	Student	Helsinki	1	8	Evicted

== Nominations table ==
The first housemate in each box was nominated for two points, and the second housemate was nominated for one point.

	Week 1	Week 2	Week 3	Week 4	Week 5					Week 6			Week 7	Week 8	Week 9	Week 10 Final	
	Week 1	Week 2	Week 3	Week 4	Day 30	Day 31	Day 32	Day 33	Day 33	Fake nomination	Public nomination	House vote	Week 7	Week 8	Week 9	Week 10 Final	
	Week 1	Week 2	Week 3	Week 4	Public vote to save				Day 33	Fake nomination	Public nomination	House vote	Week 7	Week 8	Week 9	Week 10 Final	
Kristian	Tarina; Mira	Tarina; Anu	Tarina; Kevin	Tarina; Ville	25% to save	Safe (on Day 30)				Mira; Ville	4% to nominate	Mira	Ville; Kevin	Nominated	Kevin; Anu	Winner (Day 71)	
Kevin	Tuula; Kristian	Ville; Jukka	Ville; Kristian	Ville; Kristian	33% to save	Safe (on Day 30)				Ville; Kristian	2% to nominate	Jukka	Ville; Kristian	No; Nominations	Ville; Kristian (2)	Runner-Up (Day 71)	
Helmeri	Mira; Tarina	Mira; Tuula	Tarina; Mira	Mira; Tuula	14% to save	24% to save	Safe (on Day 31)			Mira; Milla	1% to nominate	Mira	Ville; Milla	No; Nominations	Ville; Kevin	Third place (Day 71)	
Anu	Eeva-Leena; Jukka	Milla; Kristian	Eeva-Leena; Tarina	Milla; Tarina	6% to save	24% to save	Safe (on Day 31)			Milla; Jukka	9% to nominate	Jukka	Milla; Kevin	No; Nominations	Kimmo; Kristian	Fourth place (Day 71)	
Kimmo	Timo; Tarina	Milla; Timo	Tarina; Milla	Tarina; Tuula	10% to save	3% to save	22% to save	49% to save	Safe (on Day 33)	Mira; Milla	1% to nominate	Mira	Ville; Milla	No; Nominations	Anu; Helmeri	Fifth place (Day 71)	
Ville	Timo; Tuula	Timo; Tuula	Tuula; Eeva-Leena	Tuula; Tarina	9% to save	18% to save	28% to save	Safe (on Day 32)		Kristian; Helmeri	27% to nominate	Mira	Kimmo; Kristian	No; Nominations	Helmeri; Anu	Evicted (Day 64)	
Jukka	Emma; Timo	Mira; Kristian	Tarina; Mira	Anu; Tarina	3% to save	3% to save	5% to save	30% to save	Nominated	Anu; Mira	28% to nominate	Nominated	Anu; Kristian	Nominated	Evicted (Day 57)		
Milla	Jukka; Eeva-Leena	Ville; Anu	Ville; Kristian	Ville; Jukka	2% to save	8% to save	32% to save	Safe (on Day 32)		Ville; Jukka	1% to nominate	Jukka	Anu; Helmeri	Evicted (Day 50)			
Mira	Timo; Eeva-Leena	Tarina; Eeva-Leena	Jukka; Tarina	Jukka; Tarina	2% to save	11% to save	9% to save	13% to save	Nominated	Kristian; Jukka	27% to nominate	Nominated	Evicted (Day 43)				
Tuula	Timo; Emma	Timo; Eeva-Leena	Eeva-Leena; Ville	Ville; Tarina	3% to save	2% to save	4% to save	9% to save	Nominated	Evicted (Day 36)							
Tarina	Jukka; Emma	Mira; Jukka	Kristian; Jukka	Jukka; Anu	Evicted (Day 29)												
Eeva-Leena	Anu; Emma	Ville; Tuula	Ville; Tuula	Evicted (Day 22)													
Timo	Emma; Kimmo	Kimmo; Tuula	Evicted (Day 15)														
Emma	Tarina; Eeva-Leena	Evicted (Day 8)															
Deducted points	none												Helmeri (-2); Anu (-1); Kristian (-1)	none			
Note	1	none			2					3			4	5	6	7	
Nominated	Emma; Tarina; Timo	Mira; Timo; Ville	Eeva-Leena; Tarina; Ville	Jukka; Tarina; Ville	All; Housemates				Jukka; Mira; Tuula	none		Jukka; Mira	Anu; Milla; Ville	Jukka; Kristian	Anu; Ville	Anu; Helmeri; Kevin; Kimmo; Kristian	
Evicted	Emma; Fewest votes to save	Timo; Fewest votes to save	Eeva-Leena; Fewest votes to save	Tarina; Fewest votes to save	none				Tuula; 32% to save	none		Mira; 4 of 7 votes to evict	Milla; 32.9% to save	Jukka; 50.9% to evict	Ville; 49.1% to save	Kimmo; Fewest votes (out of 5)	Anu; Fewest votes (out of 4)
Evicted	Emma; Fewest votes to save	Timo; Fewest votes to save	Eeva-Leena; Fewest votes to save	Tarina; Fewest votes to save	none				Tuula; 32% to save	none		Mira; 4 of 7 votes to evict	Milla; 32.9% to save	Jukka; 50.9% to evict	Ville; 49.1% to save	Helmeri; Fewest votes (out of 3)	Kevin; 43% (out of 2)
Saved	Tarina; Timo; Most votes	Mira; Ville; Most votes	Tarina; Ville; Most votes	Jukka; Ville; Most votes	Kevin; Kristian	Anu; Helmeri	Milla; Ville	Kimmo	Jukka; Mira; Most Votes	none		Jukka; 3 of 7 votes to evict	Anu; 33,7% Ville; 33.4%	Kristian; 49.1% to evict	Anu; 50.9% to save	Kristian; 57% to win	

=== Note ===
- ^Note 1: Ville was safe from nomination after winning immunity from the weekly task and an advantage in next week's task.
- ^Note 2: All housemates are facing the public vote. After the first day, 2 housemates with the most save votes are safe. Then the second day, 2 housemates with the most save votes are safe. Voting continues every day, and finally, on Thursday's show, housemates would be informed which three are up for eviction. The votes would be reset and the last public vote would be open from Thursday evening to Sunday evening. One housemate would be evicted from the house during the eviction show.
- ^Note 3: Nominations for Week 6 are fake and all nominations would be published to housemates. The public was given the power to nominate. The two housemates with the most votes were nominated (Jukka - 28%, Mira - 27 %), and the remaining housemates would select which of the two housemates they would like to evict.
- ^Note 4: Housemates were able to reduce nomination points by using their in-house money. Helmeri bought -2 points for himself. Anu bought -1 point for herself and -1 point for Kristian.
- ^Note 5: Helmeri won immunity from "stay inside the box" competition. However, Jukka and Kristian were directly nominated for eviction by Big Brother due to serious rule violations.
- ^Note 6: Kevin won an extra nomination point to give from the public vote.
- ^Note 7: For the final week, the public were voting for who they wanted to win, rather than save.

== Nominations Points Received ==
	Week 1	Week 2	Week 3	Week 4	Week 5	Week 6		Week 7	Week 8	Week 9	Week 10	Total
Kristian	1	2	4	1	-	5	-	(3-1) 2	-	3	Winner	18
Kevin	0	0	1	0	-	0	-	2	-	3	Runner-Up	6
Helmeri	0	0	0	0	-	1	-	(1-2) -1	-	3	Third place	4
Anu	2	2	0	3	-	2	-	(4-1) 3	-	4	Fourth place	16
Kimmo	1	2	0	0	-	0	-	2	-	2	Fifth place	7
Ville	-	6	7	7	-	5	-	6	-	4	Evicted	35
Jukka	5	2	3	5	-	3	3	0	-	Evicted		21
Milla	0	4	1	2	-	4	-	4	Evicted			15
Mira	3	6	2	2	-	7	4	Evicted				24
Tuula	3	4	3	4	-	Evicted						14
Tarina	6	4	10	9	Evicted							29
Eeva-Leena	5	2	5	Evicted								12
Timo	9	5	Evicted									14
Emma	7	Evicted										7
