= Big Brother (Finnish TV series) season 6 =

Big Brother
- Season 6
- Presented by: Elina Viitanen; Susanna Laine
- No. of days: 97
- No. of housemates: 27
- Winner: Niko Nousiainen
- Runner-up: Marika Eerola
- Companion show: Big Brother Extra

Release
- Original network: Sub
- Original release: 24 August – 28 November 2010

Season chronology
- ← Previous; Big Brother 2009 Next → Big Brother 2011

Big Brother 2010 is the sixth season of the Finnish reality television season Big Brother. The open auditions for the season were held in April 2010. The season premiered on Sub on 25 August 2010 and the finale was aired on 28 November 2010.

Big Brother Talk Show was hosted by Susanna Laine and Elina Viitanen. Elina Viitanen was also the hostess of Big Brother Extra. This was the first season not hosted by Vappu Pimiä.

Niko Nousiainen was the winner.

== Housemates ==
=== Eetu ===
Eetu Karhunen Born in 1988. A paper worker living in Tampere

=== Elisabet ===
Elisabet Vuorinen Born in Helsinki in 1988. Working as a Security guard. Living in Espoo.

=== Elli-Maija ===
Elli-Maija Martikainen Born in 1988. A student living in Vantaa.

=== Ellinoora ===
Ellinoora Lehtovaara Born in 1990. Working as a practical nurse in Kuopio.

=== Esa-Tapio ===
Esa-Tapio Palmu Born in 1983 in Kouvola. Working as a youth leader.

=== Habib ===
Habib Mohseni Born in Kabul, Afghanistan in 1990. A student living in Nokia, Finland.

=== Hannu ===
Hannu Mikkola Born in 1986. A student living in Porvoo, Finland.

=== Henna ===
Henna Kalinainen was a housemate in Big Brother 2008. Born in 1989, living in Kerava

=== Inka ===
Inka Tuominen Born in 1990. A student living in Vantaa and former contestant of Suomen huippumalli haussa (season 2). She died on 11 August 2021, at the age of 31.

=== Jani T. ===
Jani Tenhunen Born in 1978. Working as a salesman in Helsinki.

=== Jani Y. ===
Jani Yliviuhkola (born in 1987). Living in Helsinki.

=== Ksenia ===
Ksenia Suokas (born in Saint Petersburg, Russia in 1990). A student living in Jyväskylä, Finland.

=== Mari ===
Mari Luhtavaara Born in Hämeenlinna in 1992. At the moment living in Helsinki. Working as a bartender.

=== Maria ===
Maria Kalho (born in Jyväskylä in 1988). At the moment living in Helsinki. Working as a promoter.

=== Marianna ===
Marianna Zaikova was a housemate in Big Brother 2008, where she was ejected for undisclosed personal reasons. Born in 1985, living in Helsinki.

=== Marika ===
Marika Eerola (born in 1987). A student living in Helsinki.

=== Mia ===
Mia Mäkipää (born in 1990). A student living in Helsinki.

=== Niko N. ===
Niko Nousiainen was a housemate in Big Brother 2007. Born in 1983, living in Helsinki. He was the winner of Big Brother 2010.

=== Niko S. ===
Niko Saarinen was a housemate in Big Brother 2008, where he was ejected for violence. Born in 1986, living in Kerava.

=== Nino ===
Nino Hermas was a housemate in Big Brother 2009, where he was ejected for sexual misconduct. Born in 1979, living in Helsinki.

=== Noora ===
Noora Kokkola Born in 1988. Working as a saleswoman in Turku.

=== Paul ===
Paul Puolakka (born in 1984 in Oulu).

=== Petri ===
Petri Tiainen Born in 1985. Living in Kuopio.

=== Riikka ===
Riikka Haahkola Born in 1986. Working in a coffee shop in Kouvola

=== Satu ===
Satu Tuisku (born in Kurikka, Southern Ostrobothnia in 1970). Working as a telemarketer.

=== Vilhelmiina ===
Vilhelmiina Noronen Born in 1986. Working as a bartender in Jyväskylä.

=== Ville ===
Ville Kinnunen Born in 1990. Living in Leppävirta.

== Nominations table ==
	Week 1	Week 2	Week 3	Week 4	Week 5	Week 6	Week 7	Week 8	Week 9	Week 10	Week 11	Week 12	Week 13	Week 14		
	Week 1	Week 2	Week 3	Week 4	Week 5	Week 6	Week 7	Week 8	Week 9	Week 10	Week 11	Week 12	Week 13	Day 90	Final	
Niko N.	Not in House	Nominated	Marika; Mia	Mia; Marika	Marika; Habib	Marika; Hannu	No nominations	Ksenia; Hannu	Inka; Petri	Nino; Marika	Nino; Jani T.	Jani T. Marika	No nominations	No nominations	Winner (Day 97)	
Marika	No nominations	No nominations	Mari; Habib	Habib; Petri	Paul; Petri	Vilhelmiina; Paul	No nominations	Petri; Niko	Petri; Niko	Eetu; Vilhelmiina	Elli-Maija; Nino	Petri; Eetu	No nominations	No nominations	Runner-up (Day 97)	
Nino	Not in House	Nominated	Mia; Marika	Mia; Paul	Petri; Riikka	Ellinoora; Hannu	No nominations	Hannu; Petri	Inka; Eetu	Eetu; Petri	Jani T. Elli-Maija	Jani T. Petri	No nominations	No nominations	Third Place (Day 97)	
Eetu	Not in House							Marika; Elisabet	Inka; Vilhelmiina	Vilhelmiina; Marika	Jani T. Elli-Maija	Jani T. Marika	No nominations	No nominations	Fourth Place (Day 97)	
Petri	No nominations	No nominations	Mia; Marika	Mia; Marika	Marika; Vilhelmiina	Marika; Vilhelmiina	No nominations	Marika; Ksenia	Inka; Marika	Marika; Nino	Elli-Maija; Marika	Marika; Nino	No nominations	No nominations	Evicted (Day 94)	
Noora	Not in House									Vilhelmiina; Marika	Petri; Jani T.	Nino; Jani T.	No nominations	No nominations	Evicted (Day 94)	
Elisabet	No nominations	No nominations	Marika; Hannu	Habib; Mia	Habib; Paul	Paul; Marika	No nominations	Hannu; Petri	Inka; Eetu	Petri; Eetu	Jani T. Elli-Maija	Jani T. Marika	No nominations	Evicted (Day 90)		
Jani T.	Not in House									Elisabet; Petri	Petri; Elli-Maija	Elisabet; Eetu	Evicted (Day 83)			
Elli-Maija	Not in House									Elisabet; Nino	Jani T. Nino	Evicted (Day 76)				
Vilhelmiina	Not in House			Mia; Habib	Habib; Petri	Ksenia; Ellinoora	No nominations	Marika; Hannu	Inka; Marika	Petri; Marika	Evicted (Day 69)					
Inka	Not in House							Niko; Elisabet	Eetu; Vilhelmiina	Evicted (Day 62)						
Ksenia	No nominations	No nominations	Mia; Habib	Habib; Mia	Riikka; Marika	Marika; Nino	No nominations	Marika; Nino	Evicted (Day 55)							
Hannu	No nominations	No nominations	Mari; Elisabet	Nino; Elisabet	Riikka; Nino	Ellinoora; Niko N.	No nominations	Ksenia; Nino	Ejected (Day 54)							
Satu	No nominations	No nominations	Mia; Mari	Mia; Hannu	Marika; Ksenia	Ellinoora; Ksenia	No nominations	Evicted (Day 48)								
Ellinoora	Not in House			Habib; Mia	Habib; Nino	Paul; Satu	Evicted (Day 41)									
Paul	No nominations	No nominations	Mari; Marika	Marika; Nino	Marika; Habib	Elisabet; Nino	Walked (Day 39)									
Ville	No nominations	No nominations	Mari; Paul	Nino; Niko	Nino; Vilhelmiina	Ejected (Day 36)										
Riikka	Not in House			Mia; Habib	Habib; Petri	Evicted (Day 34)										
Habib	No nominations	No nominations	Mari; Marika	Elisabet; Marika	Elisabet; Petri	Evicted (Day 34)										
Mia	No nominations	No nominations	Petri; Habib	Habib; Petri	Evicted (Day 27)											
Esa-Tapio	Not in House			Mia; Marika	Evicted (Day 27)											
Mari	No nominations	No nominations	Habib; Ville	Evicted (Day 20)												
Niko S.	Not in House	Nominated	Evicted (Day 13)													
Henna	Not in House	Nominated	Evicted (Day 13)													
Marianna	Not in House	Nominated	Evicted (Day 13)													
Maria	No nominations	Evicted (Day 6)														
Jani Y.	No nominations	Evicted (Day 6)														
Notes	none	^{1}	none	^{2}	none			^{3}	^{4}	^{5}	^{6}, ^{7}	none				
Nominated	All; Housemates	Marianna; Marika; Niko N. Niko S. Nino	Habib; Mari; Marika; Mia	Habib; Marika; Mia	Habib; Marika; Nino; Petri; Riikka	Ellinoora; Marika	All; Housemates	~~Hannu~~; Ksenia; Marika; Niko N. Petri	Eetu; Inka; Marika; Petri; Vilhelmiina	Eetu; Marika; Petri; Vilhelmiina	Elli-Maija; Marika; Nino; Petri	Jani T. Marika; Nino; Petri	All; Housemates	All; Housemates	Eetu; Marika; Niko N. Nino	
Walked	none					Paul	none									
Ejected	none					Ville	none	Hannu	none							
Evicted	Jani Y. Most votes to evict	Marianna; Most votes to evict	Mari -38.6% to evict	Mia -24.49% to evict	Habib; 0.43% to save	Ellinoora; 2.04% to save	Satu -9.58% to evict	Ksenia -6.46% to evict	Inka -17.44% to evict	Vilhelmiina; Most votes to evict	Elli-Maija -13.53% to evict	Jani T. -8.16% to evict	Elisabet -5.97% to evict	Noora +0.72% to save	Eetu +1.80% to win	Nino +6.59% to win
Evicted	Jani Y. Most votes to evict	Henna; Most votes to evict	Mari -38.6% to evict	Mia -24.49% to evict	Habib; 0.43% to save	Ellinoora; 2.04% to save	Satu -9.58% to evict	Ksenia -6.46% to evict	Inka -17.44% to evict	Vilhelmiina; Most votes to evict	Elli-Maija -13.53% to evict	Jani T. -8.16% to evict	Elisabet -5.97% to evict	Noora +0.72% to save	Eetu +1.80% to win	Nino +6.59% to win
Evicted	Maria; Most votes to evict	Henna; Most votes to evict	Mari -38.6% to evict	Mia -24.49% to evict	Riikka; 1.93% to save	Ellinoora; 2.04% to save	Satu -9.58% to evict	Ksenia -6.46% to evict	Inka -17.44% to evict	Vilhelmiina; Most votes to evict	Elli-Maija -13.53% to evict	Jani T. -8.16% to evict	Elisabet -5.97% to evict	Petri +3.62% to save	Marika +24.32% to win	Niko N. +25.89% to win
Evicted	Maria; Most votes to evict	Niko S. Most votes to evict	Mari -38.6% to evict	Mia -24.49% to evict	Riikka; 1.93% to save	Ellinoora; 2.04% to save	Satu -9.58% to evict	Ksenia -6.46% to evict	Inka -17.44% to evict	Vilhelmiina; Most votes to evict	Elli-Maija -13.53% to evict	Jani T. -8.16% to evict	Elisabet -5.97% to evict	Petri +3.62% to save	Marika +24.32% to win	Niko N. +25.89% to win

=== Notes ===
- ^1 In round two of nominations, all housemates living in the secret room were nominated for eviction.
- ^2 In round four of nominations, all new housemates were exempt from nominations, however as Esa-Tapio was in the House only to complete a mission of keeping his and Riikka's relationship a secret, he was evicted after the mission.
- ^3 In round eight of nominations, Eetu and Inka were immune from eviction as they were new housemates and Vilhelmiina was immune as the HOH.
- ^4 In round nine of nominations, Nino was immune from eviction as he was the HOH.
- ^5 In round ten of nominations, Elli-Maija, Jani T., and Noora were immune from eviction as they were new housemates and Niko was immune as he was taking part in the Big Brother swap with Slovenia.
- ^6 Since Niko N. was in the Slovenian Big Brother house, Sandra, who had swapped with Niko, nominated in his place during round eleven of nominations.
- ^7 In round eleven of nominations, Elisabet was immune from eviction as she was the HOH.
