= Big Brother 2009 =

Big Brother 2009 may refer to:

- Big Brother (British TV series) series 10
- Big Brother (Finnish TV series) season 5
- Celebrity Big Brother (British TV series) series 6
- Big Brother 11 (American season)
- Bigg Boss (Hindi season 3), the 2009 Hindi-language edition of Big Brother in India
