= Big Brother 2010 =

Big Brother 2010 may refer to:

- Big Brother (Finnish TV series) season 6
- Big Brother (British TV series) series 11
  - Celebrity Big Brother (British TV series) series 7
- Big Brother 12 (American season)
- Bigg Boss (season 4), the 2010–2011 edition of Big Brother in India in Hindi
