= Big Brother (Finnish TV series) season 5 =

Big Brother
- Season 5
- Presented by: Vappu Pimiä
- No. of days: 97
- No. of housemates: 21
- Winner: Aso Alanso
- Runner-up: Kätlin Laas
- Companion shows: Big Brother Talk Show; Big Brother Extra

Release
- Original network: Sub
- Original release: 25 August – 25 November 2009

Season chronology
- ← Previous; Big Brother 2008 Next → Big Brother 2010

Big Brother 2009 was the fifth season of the Finnish version of the reality show Big Brother. The show aired from August 26, 2009, to November 29, 2009, lasting 97 days. For the fifth season, the house has been split into two sides with one side representing 'Paradise' and the other representing the 'Slums'. The concept of Head of House was introduced into this season.

Vappu Pimiä was the host of the Big Brother Talk Show and Jani Toivola hosted Big Brother Extra. This was the last season where Pimiä served as a hostess; the fifth season was the only season in which Toivola appeared.

The open auditions for the season were completed in April 2009.

== Housemates ==
Fourteen housemates entered the house on the launch night. Justiina entered on Day 18, and Toni and Marko entered on Day 27, after the eviction of Lotta and Tuija. The final four housemates - Antti, Iida, Saranna and Stephania - entered on Day 55, after Minna's eviction.

| Name | Age on entry | Occupation | Hometown | Day entered | Day exited | Status |
| Aso Alanso | 30 | Construction worker | Turku, born in Iran | 1 | 97 | Winner |
| Kätlin Laas | 22 | Food Worker | Seinäjoki, born in Estonia | 1 | 97 | Runner-up |
| Esa A. Seuranen | 29 | Unemployed | Helsinki | 1 | 93 | 3rd Place |
| Antti Syrjäläinen | 30 | Unemployed | Kuopio | 55 | 97 | 4th Place |
| Sampo Salonen | 20 | Student | Helsinki | 1 | 90 | Evicted |
| Dana Mustajärvi | 21 | Student | Tampere, born in Russia | 1 | 90 | Evicted |
| Toni Haste | 24 | Restaurant Cook | Rovaniemi | 27 | 90 | Evicted |
| Stephania Prieto | 22 | Student | Helsinki, born in Colombia | 55 | 90 | Evicted |
| Sami Kallvikbacka | 30 | Media Assistant | Kokkola | 1 | 83 | Evicted |
| Saranna Ehrnrooth | 20 | Student | Helsinki | 55 | 76 | Evicted |
| Iida Ketola | 19 | TV Presenter | Espoo | 55 | 69 | Evicted |
| Marko Luukkonen | 41 | Restaurant Manager | Tampere | 27 | 62 | Evicted |
| Minna Anttonen | 32 | Nurse | Turku | 1 | 55 | Evicted |
| Jenny Justiina Parkkari | 20 | Server | Vaasa | 18 | 48 | Evicted |
| Esa J. Saonegin | 27 | Mathematics Teacher | Kouvola | 1 | 41 | Evicted |
| Nino Hermas | 30 | Playground Instructor | Helsinki | 1 | 36 | Ejected |
| Ragnar Orav | 19 | Model | Helsinki, born in Estonia | 1 | 34 | Evicted |
| Tuija Heikkinen | 23 | Cashier | Riihimäki | 83 | 90 | Left |
| Tuija Heikkinen | 23 | Cashier | Riihimäki | 1 | 27 | Evicted |
| Lotta Kangas | 18 | Hairdresser | Helsinki | 1 | 27 | Evicted |
| Jelena Roukala | 22 | Student | Espoo | 1 | 20 | Evicted |
| Terttu Mujunen | 61 | Retired | Joensuu | 1 | 13 | Evicted |
Housemate exchange
| Catherine "Cathy" Remperas | 22 | Nurse | Bohol | 69 | 74 | Returned |

== Big Brother Swap ==
It was announced during the show, that another Big Brother Swap would take place, this time with the third regular season of the Philippine franchise of Big Brother, dubbed Pinoy Big Brother. This would also be the second time that Big Brother Finland linked up with other foreign versions of the show, Season 4 being the first, when housemate Johan Grahn traded places with Munyaradzi Chidzonga from the third season of Big Brother Africa.

The Philippine version boasts of being the first Big Brother franchise with two separate and complete houses, which compete each week for their weekly budget. On Day 66, Kätlin Laas left the Big Brother house. The following day, it was announced that Catherine "Cathy" Remperas, a 22-year-old registered nurse from Bohol, Philippines would be swapped with Kätlin.

Kätlin left the Big Brother Finland House on Day 66 (Day 26 of the Philippine version) and enter either Philippine House on Day 69 (Day 29 of the Philippine version). She was supposed to arrive in the Philippines and enter either House the day before, but her flight was delayed due to weather disturbances caused by Typhoon Mirinae. Hours before her entrance, she had a brief appearance on the show The Buzz. On the other hand, Cathy was supposed to leave in the morning of Day 68 (Day 28 of the Philippines version) but their flight was postponed to a later hour of the day.

Much like the first Big Swap, events from both houses are chronicled. Also, clips from Pinoy Big Brother are shown only in Big Brother Extra, with conversations subtitled in Suomi. For the Philippine version, clips are shown in the daily show with all conversations in English subtitled in Filipino and all Finnish conversations and confessions dubbed over by Filipino voice actors.

The Big Swap started on Day 69 (evening of Day 29 of the Philippine version). Kätlin initially stayed in House A upon her arrival on Day 69. She transferred to House B on Day 71. On Day 72, Cathy and Kätlin were finally able to meet through a video call through Skype. Later that day, Kätlin returned to House A. She left the Philippine House on the morning of Day 34 of the Philippine version (early morning of Day 74 of the Finnish version). She was briefly interviewed for the morning show Umagang Kay Ganda just after stepping outside the front door. Meanwhile, Cathy entered on the evening of Day 69 (early morning of Day 30 of the Philippine version). She left six days later on the evening of Day 74 (early morning of Day 35 of the Philippine version), signaling the end of the Big Swap.

Kätlin left the Philippines the same day she left the Pinoy Big Brother house and re-entered their house in the early morning of Day 75 of the Finnish version (Day 35 of the Philippine version). Cathy left Finland the morning after she left the Finnish Big Brother house and re-entered the Pinoy Big Brother house on the evening of Day 36 of the Philippine version (Day 76 of the Finnish version).

Below is a list of activities each swapped housemate did in their respective host country's houses, aside from introductions and trading of basic phrases:

| Kätlin | In House A: Had a tropical-themed welcoming party.; Learned and sang the song "Maalaala Mo Kaya" (Will You Remember in English), together with Tom.; Participated in a water soccer game in which her team won (with Rob, Tom and Yuri) and ate Filipino exotic foods (frog legs, crickets, balut, fried worms and snails) as a reward. Patria acted as referee.; In House B: Brought plov, an Estonian dish, which is like a casserole with rice, beef or lamb, onions, carrots and ketchup.; Learned the dance Pandanggo sa Ilaw with the housemates.; Participated in a parlor game involving inline skates and her country's flag, where her team, an all-female team, lost. Tibo acted as referee.; Acted as referee in several spider fighting matches.; Had a jacuzzi party with Filipino street food (chicken head, chicken feet and chicken blood to name a few) foods, vodka and palm wine (locally known as tuba).; As instructed by Big Brother's Finnish counterpart, Kätlin taught a Finnish song "Ihmisten Edessä" (In Front of People in English), and had to choreograph a corresponding dance with the housemates. |
| Cathy | Played a game called pököpallo, invented by the Finnish housemates, a game similar to the French game pétanque.; Had a sauna and jacuzzi welcoming party.; Learned and sang the song "Sininen Ja Valkoinen" (Blue and White in English), together with all the Finnish housemates.; Learned different winter sports and activities, including cross-country skiing, ice fishing, ice hockey, floorball and pesäpallo or Finnish baseball, Finland's national sport, demonstrated by Antti, Aso and Sampo.; Had an Asian dinner with the housemates.; Experienced her first snow fall. Her housemates made a snowman for her, which she named Chuva Choo Choo.; Taught the housemates the Wowowee game Hep Hep, Hooray.; Cooked Adobo for the Finnish housemates.; Served as the judge in the Head of Household competition, which involved the housemates singing "Sininen Ja Valkoinen".; Had a Christmas dinner with the housemates and saw Santa Claus. |

Also, both Philippine and Finnish houses had weekly tasks involving housemates doing a 30-minute cultural variety show portraying their countries' cultures to their visitors. The Filipino housemates should include Kätlin in their presentation while the Finnish housemates should work four at a time in the upstairs room while Cathy is not around. However, it was later revealed that the real weekly task of the Filipino housemates is to make Kätlin feel the Filipino hospitality, to which she felt that both houses were friendly, yet she felt more warmth with House A.

More than three weeks after the Swap ended, on Day 97 of the fifth Finnish season, Kätlin was proclaimed as second placer, behind Aso.

After 10 weeks, Cathy was evicted from the Pinoy Big Brother house, however, instead of going to the outside world, she was instructed by Big Brother to live in House B along with other ex-housemates to be part of the Resbak Attack team. After an intense week, she along with the other male ex housemates finally left the house.

== Nominations table ==
The housemate first mentioned in each nomination gets two points, while the second gets one point.

| | Week 2 | Week 3 | Week 4 | Week 5 | Week 6 | Week 7 | Week 8 | Week 9 | Week 10 | Week 11 | Week 12 | Week 13 | Week 14 Final | |
|---|---|---|---|---|---|---|---|---|---|---|---|---|---|---|
| Aso | Jelena; Esa A. | Dana; Ragnar | Kätlin; Lotta | Justiina; Esa J. | Esa J. Dana | Justiina; Dana | Not eligible | Marko; Esa A. | Stephania; Iida | Stephania; Esa A. | Stephania; Esa A. | Stephania; Dana | Winner (Day 97) | |
| Kätlin | Terttu; Esa A. | Jelena; Esa A. | Aso; Esa A. | Nino; Dana | Dana; Esa A. | Sampo; Dana | Not eligible | Sampo; Toni | In Pinoy Big Brother; House | | Toni; Sami | Toni; Antti | Runner up (Day 97) | |
| Esa A. | Not eligible | Ragnar; Dana | Nino; Ragnar | Aso; Kätlin | Sampo; Toni | Justiina; Sampo | Nominated | Aso; Dana | Iida; Sami | Stephania; Aso | Sami; Toni | Kätlin; Stephania | Third Place (Day 97) | |
| Antti | Not in House | | | | | | | Exempt | Iida; Sampo | Sampo; Toni | Toni; Sami | Sampo; Dana | Fourth Place (Day 97) | |
| Sampo | Not eligible | Tuija; Esa A. | Tuija; Esa A. | Esa A. Ragnar | Esa J. Esa A. | Marko; Esa A. | Nominated | Sami; Marko | Antti; Saranna | Antti; Esa A. | Antti; Esa A. | Antti; Esa A. | Evicted (Day 90) | |
| Dana | Aso; Esa A. | Kätlin; Sami | Kätlin; Sami | Kätlin; Sami | Kätlin; Toni | Justiina; Marko | Not eligible | Toni; Marko | Toni; Antti | Nominated | Toni; Kätlin | Toni; Antti | Evicted (Day 90) | |
| Stephania | Not in House | | | | | | | Marko; Sampo | Aso; Toni | Aso; Esa A. | Aso; Toni | Aso; Toni | Evicted (Day 90) | |
| Toni | Not in House | | | Ragnar; Nino | Esa A. Marko | Justiina; Marko | Not eligible | Dana; Esa A. | Antti; Stephania | Antti; Stephania | Kätlin; Stephania | Kätlin; Stephania | Evicted (Day 90) | |
| Sami | Esa A. Tuija | Tuija; Ragnar | Tuija; Nino | Ragnar; Nino | Sampo; Marko | Sampo; Marko | Esa A. | Sampo; Marko | Stephania; Sampo | Esa A. Sampo | Esa A. Stephania | Evicted (Day 83) | | |
| Saranna | Not in House | | | | | | | Exempt | Iida; Antti | Nominated | Evicted (Day 76) | | | |
| Iida | Not in House | | | | | | | Exempt | Antti; Saranna | Evicted (Day 69) | | | | |
| Marko | Not in House | | | Ragnar; Esa J. | Toni; Aso | Toni; Justiina | Nominated | Toni; Aso | Evicted (Day 62) | | | | | |
| Minna | Terttu; Aso | Jelena; Kätlin | Aso; Esa A. | Aso; Kätlin | Marko; Kätlin | Esa A. Marko | Nominated | Evicted (Day 55) | | | | | | |
| Justiina | Not in House | | Kätlin; Esa A. | Ragnar; Esa A. | Esa A. Kätlin | Kätlin; Esa A. | Evicted (Day 48) | | | | | | | |
| Esa J. | Ragnar; Lotta | Jelena; Ragnar | Nino; Ragnar | Kätlin; Sami | Marko; Aso | Evicted (Day 41) | | | | | | | | |
| Nino | Not eligible | Kätlin; Tuija | Lotta; Ragnar | Kätlin; Ragnar | Ejected (Day 36) | | | | | | | | | |
| Ragnar | Not eligible | Sampo; Sami | Esa J. Sami | Esa J. Sami | Evicted (Day 34) | | | | | | | | | |
| Tuija | Not eligible | Lotta; Sami | Lotta; Nino | Evicted (Day 27) | | | | | | | | Guest | Re-Evicted (Day 90) | |
| Lotta | Not eligible | Tuija; Ragnar | Nino; Tuija | Evicted (Day 27) | | | | | | | | | | |
| Jelena | Aso; Terttu | Kätlin; Tuija | Evicted (Day 20) | | | | | | | | | | | |
| Terttu | Not eligible | Evicted (Day 13) | | | | | | | | | | | | |
| Notes | | | | | none | | | | | | none | | | |
| Head of House | Dana | Aso | Sampo | Sampo | Justiina | Sami | Sami | Stephania | Esa A. | Sami | Sampo | Tuija | None | |
| Up for eviction | Aso; Esa A. Terttu | Jelena; Kätlin; Ragnar; Tuija | Kätlin; Lotta; Nino; Tuija | Kätlin; Ragnar | Esa A. Esa J. Marko; Kätlin; Sampo; Toni | Justiina; Marko | Esa A. Marko; Minna; Sampo | Aso; Marko; Sami; Sampo; Toni | Antti; Iida; Stephania; Toni | Antti; Dana; Esa A. Saranna; Stephania | Esa A. Kätlin; Sami; Stephania; Toni | All; Housermates | Antti; Aso; Esa A. Kätlin | |
| Ejected | none | | | | Nino | none | | | | | | | | |
| Evicted | Terttu; Fewest votes to save | Jelena; Fewest votes to save | Lotta; 2.57% to save | Ragnar -7.3% to evict | Esa J. -11.57% to evict | Justiina -50.6% to evict | Minna -2.39% to evict | Marko -4.38% to evict | Iida -18.20% to evict | Saranna -28.05% to evict | Sami -15.45% to evict | Toni -0.13% to evict | Antti; 0.00% to win | Esa A. 15.04% to win |
| Evicted | Terttu; Fewest votes to save | Jelena; Fewest votes to save | Lotta; 2.57% to save | Ragnar -7.3% to evict | Esa J. -11.57% to evict | Justiina -50.6% to evict | Minna -2.39% to evict | Marko -4.38% to evict | Iida -18.20% to evict | Saranna -28.05% to evict | Sami -15.45% to evict | Stephania -0.10% to evict | Antti; 0.00% to win | Esa A. 15.04% to win |
| Evicted | Terttu; Fewest votes to save | Jelena; Fewest votes to save | Tuija; 2.67% to save | Ragnar -7.3% to evict | Esa J. -11.57% to evict | Justiina -50.6% to evict | Minna -2.39% to evict | Marko -4.38% to evict | Iida -18.20% to evict | Saranna -28.05% to evict | Sami -15.45% to evict | Dana; 0.08% to save | Kätlin; 16.73% to win | Aso; 18.39% to win |
| Evicted | Terttu; Fewest votes to save | Jelena; Fewest votes to save | Tuija; 2.67% to save | Ragnar -7.3% to evict | Esa J. -11.57% to evict | Justiina -50.6% to evict | Minna -2.39% to evict | Marko -4.38% to evict | Iida -18.20% to evict | Saranna -28.05% to evict | Sami -15.45% to evict | Sampo; 0.35% to save | Kätlin; 16.73% to win | Aso; 18.39% to win |

=== Notes ===
- ^1 In round one of the nominations, only housemates living in paradise were eligible to nominate.
- ^2 On his second day as Head of House, Aso was stripped of his title for failing to keep mum on his task.
- ^3 As a new housemate, Justiina was allowed to nominate but could not be nominated.
- ^4 As new housemates, Marko and Toni were allowed to nominate but could not be nominated.
- ^5 In round seven of nominations, the Head of House Sami was the only person allowed to nominate as Marko, Minna, and Sampo had already been nominated as punishment by Big Brother. Dana, Esa A., Kätlin and Minna lived in the Slums while the rest of the housemates lived in Paradise.
- ^6 As new housemates, Antti, Iida, Saranna and Stephania were not allowed to nominate or be nominated and lived in Paradise but because she was Head of House, Stephania was permitted to nominate.
- ^7 Kätlin was immune from eviction in round nine of nominations as she was taking part in a Big Brother swap.
- ^8 In round ten of nominations, Dana and Saranna were automatically nominated for eviction by Big Brother as punishment. The Head of House competition was judged by swap housemate Cathy. Kätlin was immune from eviction as she still was at the Pinoy Big Brother house after the previous week's Big Brother swap.
- ^9 In round twelve of nominations, all nominations were voided and all of the housemates were automatically nominated for eviction. A mock nomination was instead held, unknown to the housemates.
- ^10 There were no nominations in the final week as the public were voting for housemates to win, rather than be evicted.

== Head of House competitions ==
As a new twist this season, there is a Head of House (HoH), who cannot be nominated and gets to decide which housemates will live in Paradise and which housemates will live in Slums. Housemates in Paradise get to live in the main house, have hot water 24/7 for bathing, plenty of food and the right to nominate. Housemates in Slums get to live in a makeshift area, sleeping on the floor with their jackets as blankets, a garden hose to wash in a roofless toilet, limited food (rice, sardines, porridge and pea soup), and had to earn their right to nominate in Nominations Competitions.

The following Head of Household competitions have taken place:

- Week 2: Standing on one foot
- Week 3: Finding a candy from a bowl of sour milk using the mouth
- Week 4: General knowledge quiz
- Week 5: Transporting moving crates through an obstacle course
- Week 6: Finding marbles hidden in bushes
- Week 7: Shuttle run
- Week 8: Basketball throwing
- Week 9: Fear Factor-style eating competition
- Week 10: Uncharted 2 PlayStation game
- Week 11: Singing Sininen Ja Valkoinen
- Week 12: Eat a certain portion from 90-241 kcals, guess how long it will take to burn the food they ate and burn the food they ate using an exercise bicycle.
