= Big Brother (Finnish TV series) season 4 =

Big Brother
- Season 4
- Presented by: Vappu Pimiä
- No. of days: 97
- No. of housemates: 22
- Winner: Anniina Mustajärvi
- Runner-up: Tero Savikuja
- Companion show: Big Brother Extra

Release
- Original network: Sub
- Original release: 26 August – 30 November 2008

Season chronology
- ← Previous; Big Brother 2007 Next → Big Brother 2009

Big Brother 2008 was the fourth season of the Finnish version of the reality television show Big Brother. It aired on Sub (former Subtv) in Finland, from 26 August 2008 to 30 November 2008, lasting for 97 days.

Vappu Pimiä was the host of Big Brother Talk Show and Janne Kataja hosted of Big Brother Extra.

Unlike previous seasons, this year the Sub also aired an interactive text message contest Big Brother Game on weekdays, hosted by three of housemates from the third season Kadi, Farbod and Aki. This year's fallen residents hosted individual broadcasts.

This season has pre-determined rules that all housemates must strictly follow. Housemate violated the rules will be punished. However, Big Brother reserves the right to change the rules at any time without notice.

The open auditions for the season were completed in April 2008 in Helsinki, Oulu, Rovaniemi, Jyväskylä, Tampere and Turku. In addition, based on audition videos published on the Internet community, the public could choose their own favorite as a housemates.

A number of contestants (known as "housemates") live in a purpose-built house in Espoo, and are isolated from the rest of the world. Each week, each housemate nominates two of their peers for eviction, and the housemates who receive the most nominations will face a public vote. Of these, one will eventually leave, having been "evicted" from the House. However, there sometimes are exceptions to this process as dictated by Big Brother, known as "twists".

== Housemates ==
Thirteen housemates entered the house on the launch night. Four entered on Day 20, shortly before Marko's eviction, while two housemates entered on Day 45 as replacements for Harri and Marianna. Another two male housemates entered on Day 71, and one housemate on Day 73.

Name	Age on entry	Hometown	Day entered	Day exited	Status
Anniina Mustajärvi	19	Tampere	20	97	Winner
Tero Savikuja	28	Helsinki	1	97	Runner-up
Johan Grahn	23	Tampere	1	97	3rd Place
Jarmo Uusitalo	22	Tornio	71	97	4th Place
Tuuli Vuokola	23	Tampere	20	90	Evicted
Anna Sällylä	22	Tampere	45	90	Evicted
Alex Hytönen	19	Hyvinkää	71	90	Evicted
Henna Kalinainen	19	Kerava	73	83	Evicted
Cheryll Karri	24	Helsinki	1	76	Evicted
Jari-Matti Kurri	23	Turku	20	69	Evicted
Kaisa-Reeta Kivistö	20	Vantaa	45	62	Evicted
Marianne Oikkonen	19	Helsinki	1	55	Evicted
Andreas Grönblom	23	Turku	1	48	Evicted
Niko Saarinen	21	Kerava	1	46	Ejected
Antti Kurhinen	24	Helsinki	20	41	Evicted
Mia Leviö	19	Helsinki	1	34	Evicted
Harri Huhta-aho	20	Korpilahti	1	28	Walked
Maria Suominen	34	Keuruu	1	27	Evicted
Marianna Zaikova	23	Helsinki	1	21	Walked
Marko Kaarto	31	Tampere	1	20	Evicted
Minna Sara	21	Helsinki	1	13	Evicted
Risto Kuoppala	23	Tampere	1	13	Evicted
Housemate exchange
Munyaradzi "Munya" Chidzonga (from Big Brother Africa 3)	22	Zimbabwe	55	60	Returned

== Voting format ==
Any viewer may cast as many evict or save votes as they choose. Prior to eviction each housemates' evict votes were merged with their save votes; the housemate with the lowest number of save votes remaining after the merge is evicted.

== Nominations table ==
The first housemate listed is nominated for two points, while the second housemate is nominated for one point. The two or more housemates with the most nomination points face the public vote to save/evict, and when the save votes are subtracted from the evict votes, the housemate with the most evict votes is evicted.

	Week 1	Week 2	Week 3	Week 4	Week 5	Week 6	Week 7	Week 8	Week 9	Week 10	Week 11	Week 12	Week 13	Week 14	
Anniina	Not in House			Niko; Cheryll	No nominations	Andreas; Niko	Tero; Jari-Matti	Tero; Jari-Matti	Tero; Jari-Matti	Jari-Matti; Tero	Cheryll; Tero	Tero; Johan	Johan; Tero	Winner (Day 97)	
Tero	Marianne; Marko	Risto; Cheryll	Maria; Niko	Maria; Niko	No nominations	Tuuli; Johan	Banned	Marianne; Anniina	Anniina; Cheryll	Anniina; Anna	Anniina; Anna	Henna; Anniina	Johan; Anna	Runner-Up (Day 97)	
Johan	Cheryll; Marianna	Cheryll; Minna	Cheryll; Niko	Cheryll; Niko	No nominations	Andreas; Tero	Banned	Tuuli; Tero	Kaisa-Reeta; Jari-Matti	Banned	Tuuli; Cheryll	Henna; Tuuli	Tuuli; Alex	Third Place (Day 97)	
Jarmo	Not in House										Tuuli; Anna	Tero; Henna	Alex; Tero	Fourth Place (Day 97)	
Alex	Not in House										Anna; Tuuli	Henna; Jarmo	Jarmo; Johan	Evicted (Day 90)	
Tuuli	Not in House			Marianne; Maria	No nominations	Tero; Cheryll	Johan; Marianne	Marianne; Jari-Matti	Kaisa-Reeta; Jari-Matti	Jari-Matti; Cheryll	Johan; Jarmo	Johan; Henna	Johan; Jarmo	Evicted (Day 90)	
Anna	Not in House							Jari-Matti; Cheryll	Cheryll; Jari-Matti	Cheryll; Jari-Matti	Cheryll; Tero	Tero; Henna	Tero; Tuuli	Evicted (Day 90)	
Henna	Not in House											Anna; Johan	Evicted (Day 83)		
Cheryll	Marko; Minna	Tero; Marianna	Mia; Tero	Maria; Johan	No nominations	Tuuli; Jari-Matti	Andreas; Tero	Anniina; Tuuli	Kaisa-Reeta; Tero	Tuuli; Anna	Anniina; Anna	Evicted (Day 76)			
Jari-Matti	Not in House			Maria; Cheryll	No nominations	Andreas; Johan	Cheryll; Tuuli	Tuuli; Marianne	Anna; Kaisa-Reeta	Anna; Cheryll	Evicted (Day 69)				
Kaisa-Reeta	Not in House							Tuuli; Jari-Matti	Cheryll; Tuuli	Evicted (Day 62)					
Marianne	Marianna; Minna	Marianna; Minna	Mia; Marko	Maria; Niko	No nominations	Andreas; Johan	Banned	Tero; Tuuli	Evicted (Day 55)						
Andreas	Minna; Harri	Minna; Risto	Marko; Cheryll	Johan; Harri	Nominated	Niko; Anniina	Banned	Evicted (Day 48)							
Niko	Risto; Marianne	Risto; Marianna	Marko; Cheryll	Tero; Johan	Nominated	Andreas; Cheryll	Banned	Ejected (Day 46)							
Antti	Not in House			Niko; Maria	No nominations	Cheryll; Johan	Evicted (Day 41)								
Mia	Marianna; Marianne	Minna; Risto	Cheryll; Marko	Cheryll; Tero	Nominated	Evicted (Day 34)									
Harri	Marko; Maria	Risto; Maria	Maria; Mia	Maria; Cheryll	Walked (Day 28)										
Maria	Minna; Risto	Minna; Risto	Johan; Cheryll	Johan; Harri	Evicted (Day 27)										
Marianna	Marko; Marianne	Risto; Minna	Marko; Cheryll	Walked (Day 21)											
Marko	Harri; Risto	Banned	Marianna; Cheryll	Evicted (Day 20)											
Risto	Maria; Marko	Andreas; Maria	Evicted (Day 13)												
Minna	Tero; Marianne	Mia; Maria	Evicted (Day 13)												
Nomination notes	,	,	none		,						none		,		
Against Public Vote	Marianne; Marko	Marko; Minna; Risto	Cheryll; Marko	Maria; Cheryll; Niko	Andreas; Mia; Niko	Anniina; Antti; Jari-Matti; Marianne	Andreas; Cheryll; Johan; Tero	Jari-Matti; Marianne; Tero; Tuuli	Cheryll; Kaisa-Reeta	Anna; Cheryll; Jari-Matti; Johan	Anna; Cheryll; Tuuli	Henna; Tero	Alex; Anna; Anniina; Jarmo; Johan; Tero; Tuuli	Anniina; Jarmo; Johan; Tero	
Walked	none			Marianna	Harri	none									
Ejected	none						Niko	none							
Evicted	Marko; 8 points to fake evict	Minna -23.7% to evict	Marko -7.09% to evict	Maria -13.10% to evict	Mia -1.94% to evict	Antti -26.25% to evict	Andreas -7.57% to evict	Marianne; Most votes to evict	Kaisa-Reeta -0.19% to evict	Jari-Matti -6.98% to evict	Cheryll -8.83% to evict	Henna -27.99% to evict	Anna -0.42% to evict	Jarmo; 0.34% (out of 4)	Johan; 7.37% (out of 3)
Evicted	Marko; 8 points to fake evict	Minna -23.7% to evict	Marko -7.09% to evict	Maria -13.10% to evict	Mia -1.94% to evict	Antti -26.25% to evict	Andreas -7.57% to evict	Marianne; Most votes to evict	Kaisa-Reeta -0.19% to evict	Jari-Matti -6.98% to evict	Cheryll -8.83% to evict	Henna -27.99% to evict	Tuuli; 0.21% to save	Jarmo; 0.34% (out of 4)	Johan; 7.37% (out of 3)
Evicted	Marko; 8 points to fake evict	Risto -4.6% to evict	Marko -7.09% to evict	Maria -13.10% to evict	Mia -1.94% to evict	Antti -26.25% to evict	Andreas -7.57% to evict	Marianne; Most votes to evict	Kaisa-Reeta -0.19% to evict	Jari-Matti -6.98% to evict	Cheryll -8.83% to evict	Henna -27.99% to evict	Tuuli; 0.21% to save	Tero; 14.99% (out of 2)	Anniina; 21.68% to win
Evicted	Marko; 8 points to fake evict	Risto -4.6% to evict	Marko -7.09% to evict	Maria -13.10% to evict	Mia -1.94% to evict	Antti -26.25% to evict	Andreas -7.57% to evict	Marianne; Most votes to evict	Kaisa-Reeta -0.19% to evict	Jari-Matti -6.98% to evict	Cheryll -8.83% to evict	Henna -27.99% to evict	Alex; 0.75% to save	Tero; 14.99% (out of 2)	Anniina; 21.68% to win

Housemate was given immunity and could not be nominated for eviction.

=== Notes ===
- ^1 This week the nominations were fake.
- ^2 Marko was fake evicted, and he has to live in the upstairs room undetected by the others. If he passes this mission, he will be immune from the next nominations.
- ^3 Marko was supposed to live in the upstairs room undetected by the others, but he voluntarily threw in the towel after less than 24 hours and rejoined the others, so he was automatically up for eviction.
- ^4 There was a double eviction this Sunday.
- ^5 Andreas, Mia and Niko were nominated for discussing nominations, talking about previous Big Brother seasons and talking about casting/production issues. Harri was automatically nominated for not going to bed when told to do so.
- ^6 Harri was initially up for eviction but he was taken ill with blood poisoning during the week and left the house to go to the hospital.
- ^7 This week the housemates nominated who they wanted to stay in the house. The two or more housemates with the fewest points were up for eviction.
- ^8 Andreas, Johan, Marianne, Niko and Tero were banned from nominating as punishment for discussing nominations.
- ^9 Johan won immunity during this week's task.
- ^10 Since Johan was in the Big Brother Africa house, Munya swapped with Johan from the Big Brother Africa house nominated in his place.
- ^11 Johan was automatically nominated by Big Brother because he voluntarily left Big Brother house in Africa. He also was not allowed to nominate because he was immune from being nominated last week because he was in Africa.
- ^12 This week the nominations were fake, all housemates were up for eviction.
- ^13 There was a triple eviction this Sunday.
- ^14 There were no nominations in the final week and the public were voting for housemates to win, rather than be evicted.
