= Big Brother (Finnish TV series) season 3 =

Big Brother
- Season 3
- Presented by: Vappu Pimiä
- No. of days: 97
- No. of housemates: 20
- Winner: Sauli Koskinen
- Runner-up: Kadi Kaljula
- Companion show: Big Brother Extra

Release
- Original network: Sub
- Original release: 28 August – 2 December 2007

Season chronology
- ← Previous; Big Brother 2006 Next → Big Brother 2008

Big Brother 2007 was the third season of the Finnish reality television season Big Brother. It aired on SubTV in Finland, from 28 August 2007 to 2 December 2007, and lasted 97 days.

A number of contestants (known as "housemates") lived in a purpose-built house in Espoo, and were isolated from the rest of the world. Each week, each housemate nominated two of their peers for eviction, and the housemates who received the most nominations would face a public vote. Of these, one would eventually leave, having been "evicted" from the House. However, there sometimes were exceptions to this process as dictated by Big Brother, known as "twists".

Vappu Pimiä was the host of Big Brother Talk Show for the first time in this season; Janne Kataja hosted Big Brother Extra since Pimiä left Extra to host the Talk Show.

== Housemates ==
There were a total of twenty housemates in this season of Big Brother. Twelve entered at the Launch, including Piia, who was the winner of a vote on an internet video site, and won a place in the house. Heli entered after Tiina M left the house after she found out she was pregnant. Four new housemates - Farbod, Niko, Suvi and Tiina H entered shortly after Henri's eviction. Aki was ejected for not disclosing important issues about himself during the casting process and was replaced by Jussi. Martina entered the house after Maxine's eviction, and left when she learnt of her grandfather's death, and was replaced by Riita, who was the final housemate to enter the house in this season.

Name	Age on entry	Occupation	Hometown	Day entered	Day exited	Status
Sauli Koskinen	22	Cloth salesman	Helsinki	1	97	Winner
Kadi Kaljula	24	Cemetery groundskeeper and freelance artist	Helsinki	1	97	Runner-up
Niko Nousiainen	24	Student	Espoo	27	97	3rd Place
Riitta Laari	56	Nurse	Luumäki	62	97	4th Place
Jarkko Ojala	26	Steel fixer and bouncer	Seinäjoki	1	90	Evicted
Suvi Koivula	23	Physiotherapy student	Jyväskylä	27	83	Evicted
Farbod Mehrabkhani	20	Business college graduate	Vantaa	27	76	Evicted
Piia Salminen	29	Casino dealer and riding instructor	Rauma	1	69	Evicted
Tiina Hautala	24	Student	Vantaa	27	62	Evicted
Timo Hytönen	24	Salesman	Seinäjoki	1	55	Evicted
Martina Aitolehti	25	Model and TV host	Helsinki	41	49	Walked
Jussi Järvelä	27	Bouncer and fireman	Kaustinen	34	48	Evicted
Maxine Frisk	20	College student	Espoo	1	41	Evicted
Heli Niemi	23	Student, former youth worker and show-dancer	Orimattila	13	34	Evicted
Aki Abiodun	36	Transport co-ordinator	Helsinki	1	32	Ejected
Henri Kuukasjärvi	26	Bartender	Turku	1	27	Evicted
Satu Olkinuora	22	Student	Jyväskylä	1	20	Evicted
Timo Einari Rautio	18	Student	Espoo	1	13	Evicted
Tiina Mikkola	27	Night Nurse	Turenki	1	11	Walked
Maria Eklund	23	University student	Sipoo	1	6	Evicted

== Voting format ==
Any viewer may cast as many evict or save votes as they choose. Prior to eviction each housemates' evict votes were merged with their save votes; the housemate with the lowest number of save votes remaining after the merge is evicted.

== Nominations table ==
	Week 1	Week 2	Week 3	Week 4	Week 5	Week 6	Week 7	Week 8	Week 9	Week 10	Week 11	Week 12	Week 13	Week 14	
Sauli	Einari; Maria	Henri; Einari	Satu; Henri	Henri; Heli	Aki; Kadi	Farbod; Piia	Jussi; Farbod	Martina; Farbod	Farbod; Suvi	Jarkko; Piia	Farbod; Suvi	Jarkko; Suvi	Jarkko; Riitta	Winner (Day 97)	
Kadi	Henri; Maxine	Henri; Satu	Henri; Satu	Henri; Heli	Timo; Heli	Niko; Maxine	Timo; Jussi	Timo; Martina	Tiina H Farbod	Niko; Piia	Farbod; Sauli	Sauli; Riitta	Sauli; Riitta	Runner-Up (Day 97)	
Niko	Not in house				Heli; Maxine	Maxine; Piia	Jussi; Suvi	Martina; Kadi	Tiina H Piia	Farbod; Suvi	Suvi; Riitta	Jarkko; Suvi	Jarkko; Riitta	Third Place (Day 97)	
Riitta	Not in house									Jarkko; Suvi	Farbod; Kadi	Suvi; Jarkko	Jarkko; Kadi	Fourth Place (Day 97)	
Jarkko	Maria; Einari	Henri; Einari	Henri; Satu	Heli; Henri	Heli; Kadi	Tiina H Farbod	Tiina H Jussi	Tiina H Martina	Tiina H Piia	Piia; Farbod	Riitta; Farbod	Riitta; Suvi	Riitta; Sauli	Evicted (Day 90)	
Suvi	Not in house				Heli; Piia	Niko; Maxine	Jussi; Niko	Niko; Martina	Piia; Farbod	Piia; Farbod	Niko; Riitta	Riitta; Niko	Evicted (Day 83)		
Farbod	Not in house				Maxine; Sauli	Maxine; Piia	Jarkko; Sauli	Jarkko; Sauli	Tiina H Sauli	Piia; Kadi	Suvi; Niko	Evicted (Day 76)			
Piia	Maria; Maxine	Satu; Einari	Satu; Henri	Heli; Kadi	Heli; Kadi	Suvi; Niko	Jussi; Kadi	Kadi; Martina	Kadi; Tiina H	Jarkko; Kadi	Evicted (Day 69)				
Tiina H	Not in house				Heli; Timo	Farbod; Kadi	Jussi; Kadi	Martina; Kadi	Farbod; Kadi	Evicted (Day 62)					
Timo	Maria; Einari	Einari; Kadi	Piia; Kadi	Kadi; Maxine	Kadi; Piia	Kadi; Piia	Kadi; Tiina H	Martina; Kadi	Evicted (Day 55)						
Martina	Not in house						Jussi; Suvi	Timo; Kadi	Walked (Day 49)						
Jussi	Not in house					Kadi; Tiina H	Kadi; Niko	Evicted (Day 48)							
Maxine	Maria; Kadi	Henri; Satu	Satu; Henri	Aki; Heli	Aki; Kadi	Niko; Kadi	Evicted (Day 41)								
Heli	Not in house		Maxine; Piia	Maxine; Henri	Kadi; Jarkko	Evicted (Day 34)									
Aki	Maria; Maxine	Henri; Satu	Maxine; Henri	Henri; Kadi	Kadi; Jarkko	Ejected (Day 32)									
Henri	Maria; Satu	Kadi; Einari	Satu; Kadi	Kadi; Maxine	Evicted (Day 27)										
Satu	Einari; Maria	Einari; Henri	Kadi; Henri	Evicted (Day 20)											
Einari	Maria; Sauli	Henri; Timo	Evicted (Day 13)												
Tiina M	Satu; Jarkko	Piia; Jarkko	Walked (Day 11)												
Maria	Satu; Kadi	Evicted (Day 6)													
Notes	none					,			none			none			
Against Public Vote	Einari; Maria	Einari; Henri	Henri; Satu	Heli; Henri	Heli; Kadi	Kadi; Maxine; Niko; Timo	Jussi; Kadi	Kadi; Timo	Farbod; Tiina H	Jarkko; Piia	Farbod; Jarkko; Suvi	Jarkko; Riitta; Suvi	Jarkko; Kadi; Niko; Riitta; Sauli	Kadi; Niko; Riitta; Sauli	
Walked	none	Tiina	none					Martina	none						
Ejected	none				Aki	none									
Evicted	Maria ?% to save	Einari; 0% to evict	Satu -7% to evict	Henri -18% to evict	Heli -33% to evict	Maxine -9% to evict	Jussi -15% to evict	Timo; 9.5% to save	Tiina H -19% to evict	Piia -15% to evict	Farbod -7% to evict	Suvi -7% to evict	Jarkko -13% to evict	Riitta; 0.56% to win	Niko; 13.07% to win
Evicted	Maria ?% to save	Einari; 0% to evict	Satu -7% to evict	Henri -18% to evict	Heli -33% to evict	Maxine -9% to evict	Jussi -15% to evict	Timo; 9.5% to save	Tiina H -19% to evict	Piia -15% to evict	Farbod -7% to evict	Suvi -7% to evict	Jarkko -13% to evict	Kadi; 40.62% to win	Sauli; 45.75% to win

Housemate was given immunity and could not be nominated for eviction.

=== Notes ===
- ^1 Heli was immune from being nominated as she was a new housemate, she was able to nominate.
- ^2 Henri was given 2 points by Big Brother as a punishment because he's tried to communicate with the outside world on several occasions.
- ^3 Farbod, Niko, Suvi and Tiina H were immune from being nominated as they were new housemates, they were able to nominate.
- ^4 Jussi was immune from being nominated as he was a new housemate, he was able to nominate.
- ^5 Kadi answered the phone, and she had to choose the first nominee. She chose Timo to be automatically up for eviction.
- ^6 Martina was immune from being nominated as she was a new housemate, she was able to nominate.
- ^7 Martina and Kadi received the most nomination points this week. However, as Martina voluntarily left the house, Timo is up for eviction with Kadi.
- ^8 Riitta was immune from being nominated as she was a new housemate, she was able to nominate.
- ^9 Jarkko answered the phone, and by doing so was automatically nominated by Big Brother.
- ^10 Big Brother declared these nominations void and instead all five remaining housemates are up for eviction and face the public vote.
- ^11 There were no nominations in the final week, instead, the public was voting for their winner, rather than be evicted.
