= Big Brother (Finnish TV series) season 7 =

Big Brother
- Season 7
- Presented by: Elina Viitanen; Susanna Laine
- No. of days: 104
- No. of housemates: 22
- Winner: Janica Kortman
- Runner-up: Mikael Pertulla
- Companion show: Big Brother Extra

Release
- Original network: Sub
- Original release: 30 August – 11 December 2011

Season chronology
- ← Previous; Big Brother 2010 Next → Big Brother 2012

Big Brother 2011 is the seventh season of the Finnish reality television series Big Brother. The season premiered on 31 August 2011, on Sub and the finale was aired on 11 December 2011. The show is produced by Endemol Finland Oy. The seventh season was confirmed on 8 March 2011, in a press release issued from Sub.

Elina Viitanen and Susanna Laine both returned to host the show, though it was originally reported that Laine would not continue. Viitanen is the host of Big Brother Extra and Big Brother Talk Show, and Laine hosts Big Brother Talk Show alongside Viitanen. Viitanen also joined the House as a Guest Housemate on Day 70.

== Housemates ==
Housemates	Age	Occupation	Residence	Day entered	Day exited	Status
Janica Kortman	30	Accountant	Kirkkonummi	1	104	Winner
Mikael Perttula	23	—	Vantaa	1	104	Runner-up
Suvi Pehkonen	34	—	Helsinki	1	104	3rd Place
Tanja Westerlund	23	—	Espoo	1	104	4th Place
Ben Grundström	22	—	Vantaa	1	104	5th Place
Sebastian Tynkkynen	22	Student	Oulu	1	97	Evicted
Netta Koskinen	25	Hairdresser	Raisio	63	90	Evicted
Netta Koskinen	25	Hairdresser	Raisio	12	18	Ejected
Rami Hietaharju	32	Machine operator	Ylöjärvi	48	83	Evicted
Annika Niemi	23	—	Espoo	1	76	Evicted
Veera Utriainen	21	—	Tampere	12	76	Evicted
Stefan Andersson	39	—	Porvoo	1	69	Evicted
Matti Hallamaa	28	Sports massage therapist	Helsinki	48	62	Evicted
Terhi Hautala	24	—	Vantaa	1	55	Evicted
Salar Moraweji	20	—	Turku	1	48	Evicted
Amanda Harkimo	20	—	Sipoo	3	41	Evicted
Minna Mononen	20	—	Joensuu	1	34	Evicted
Tamer Karabulut	26	—	Vantaa	1	27	Evicted
Oskar Elmgren	33	—	Espoo	1	20	Evicted
Liana Enckell	21	—	Helsinki	12	18	Ejected
Kaisa Metso	26	—	Tampere	12	18	Ejected
Tia Kluru	21	—	Vantaa	1	3	Walked
Guest
Elina Viitanen	27	Host of Big Brother	Helsinki	70	74	Left
Housemate exchange
Siv Anita Aurstad	24	Ambulance driver and a student	Trondheim, Norway	53	62	Returned

== Housemate exchange ==
A housemate exchange happened between Big Brother Suomi and Big Brother Norge. 24 years old ambulance driver and a student Siv Anita from the Norwegian Big Brother house exchanged with Janica for a period of time.

== Straw Swap ==
Straw Swap (Oljenkorsi) is a competition, where nominated housemates compete with each other. The winner is allowed to do a swap where he or she chooses either herself or himself or somebody other nominated away from the eviction. The winner must choose a non-nominated housemate to replace the swapped person for eviction.

== Nominations table ==
	Week 3	Week 4	Week 5	Week 6	Week 7	Week 8	Week 9	Week 10	Week 11	Week 12	Week 13	Week 14	Week 15 Final		Nominations received
Janica	Tamer; Oskar	Annika; ~~Veera~~	Annika; Veera	Annika; ~~Mikael~~	Annika	In Big Brother Norway; House		Veera; Stefan	No nominations	Netta	Netta; Ben	Ben; Tanja	Winner (Day 104)		23
Mikael	Tamer; Oskar	Tanja; Tamer	Tanja; Suvi	Janica; Tanja	Salar	Tanja; Suvi	Tanja; Suvi	Tanja; Janica	No nominations	Netta	Netta; Tanja	Tanja; Suvi	Runner-Up (Day 104)		10
Suvi	Tamer; Oskar	Tamer; Minna	Stefan; ~~Mikael~~	~~Mikael~~; Annika	Annika	Stefan; Veera	Veera; Annika	Veera; Stefan	No nominations	Rami	Tanja; Ben	Tanja; Ben	Third Place (Day 104)		27
Tanja	Oskar; ~~Mikael~~	Ben; Tamer	Annika; ~~Mikael~~	~~Mikael~~; Stefan	Salar	Stefan; Ben	Ben; Sebastian	Ben; Stefan	No nominations	Rami	Netta; Suvi	Sebastian; Suvi	Fourth Place (Day 104)		41
Ben	Tanja; Janica	Janica; Terhi	Sebastian; Suvi	Sebastian; Terhi	Salar	Suvi; Sebastian	Sebastian; Tanja	Sebastian; Tanja	No nominations	Nominated	Netta; Janica	Janica; Sebastian	Fifth Place (Day 104)		30
Sebastian	Ben; Oskar	Ben; ~~Veera~~	Ben; Veera	Stefan; Annika	Annika	Veera; Annika	Annika; Veera	Ben; Veera	No nominations	Rami	Ben; Netta	Tanja; Ben	Evicted (Day 97)		28
Netta	Not in House	Ejected (Day 17)						Ben; Stefan	No nominations	Nominated	Ben; Tanja	Evicted (Day 90)			11
Rami	Not in House				Exempt		Annika; Ben	Tanja; Sebastian	No nominations	Nominated	Evicted (Day 83)				3
Annika	Tamer; Minna	Tamer; Minna	Minna; Janica	Janica; Stefan	Nominated	Sebastian; Suvi	Sebastian; Suvi	Sebastian; Janica	No nominations	Evicted (Day 76)					28
Veera	Oskar; Suvi	Terhi; Tamer	Suvi; Sebastian	Terhi; Tanja	Annika	Terhi; Annika	Tanja; Suvi	Janica; Tanja	No nominations	Evicted (Day 76)					15
Stefan	Oskar; Tamer	Sebastian; Suvi	Suvi; Sebastian	Suvi; Tanja	Salar	Terhi; Suvi	Sebastian; Suvi	Janica; Tanja	Evicted (Day 69)						18
Matti	Not in House				Exempt		Tanja; Stefan	Evicted (Day 62)							0
Terhi	Tamer; Oskar	Amanda; Minna	Ben; Minna	Stefan; Tanja	Salar	Suvi; Stefan	Evicted (Day 55)								20
Salar	Janica; Terhi	Nominated	Suvi; Tanja	Janica; Tanja	Nominated	Evicted (Day 48)									5
Amanda	Terhi; Janica	Terhi; Tanja	Sebastian; Suvi	Terhi; Annika	Evicted (Day 41)										2
Minna	Annika; Oskar	Annika; ~~Mikael~~	Annika; ~~Mikael~~	Evicted (Day 34)											9
Tamer	Terhi; Janica	Tanja; Terhi	Evicted (Day 27)												19
Oskar	Minna; Tamer	Evicted (Day 20)													12
Liana	Not in House	Ejected (Day 17)													0
Kaisa	Not in House	Ejected (Day 17)													0
Tia	Walked (Day 3)														0
Public nomination	none				Annika; 30.68% Salar; 30.20%	none				Ben; 14.13% Rami; 13.44% Netta; 1.89%	none				
Notes	1 2	3	4	none	8	none	5	6	7	8	none				
Nominated (Pre-Straw Swap)	Janica; Oskar; Tamer; Terhi	Salar; Tamer; Tanja; Terhi	none	Annika; Janica; Stefan; Tanja; Terhi	none		Matti; Rami; Sebastian; Tanja	Annika; Ben; Janica; Stefan; Suvi	none						
Straw Swap	Tamer → Annika	Tanja → Mikael	none	Terhi → Amanda	none		Annika → Rami	Tanja → Stefan	none						
Nominated For Eviction	Annika; Janica; Oskar; Terhi	Salar; Tamer; Terhi	Annika; Ben; Minna; Sebastian; Suvi; Tanja	Amanda; Annika; Janica; Stefan; Tanja	Annika; Salar	Stefan; Suvi; Terhi	Matti; Rami; Sebastian; Tanja	Annika; Ben; Janica; Stefan; Suvi	Annika; Mikael; Sebastian; Suvi; Veera	Ben; Netta; Rami	Ben; Netta; Tanja	Ben; Sebastian; Tanja	Ben; Janica; Mikael; Suvi; Tanja		
Walked	Tia	none													
Ejected	Netta; Kaisa; Liana	none													
Evicted	Oskar; 22.90% to save	Tamer; 32.64% to save	Minna; 15.62% to save	Amanda; 17.49% to save	Salar; 5 of 9 votes to evict	Terhi; 20.48% to save	Matti; 16.72% to save	Stefan; 17.54% to save	Veera; 5.2% to save	Rami; 3 of 5 votes to evict	Netta; 30.61% to save	Sebastian; 32.44% to save	Ben; 1.33% to win	Tanja; 2.71% to win	
Evicted	Oskar; 22.90% to save	Tamer; 32.64% to save	Minna; 15.62% to save	Amanda; 17.49% to save	Salar; 5 of 9 votes to evict	Terhi; 20.48% to save	Matti; 16.72% to save	Stefan; 17.54% to save	Veera; 5.2% to save	Rami; 3 of 5 votes to evict	Netta; 30.61% to save	Sebastian; 32.44% to save	Suvi; 5.52% to win	Mikael; 42.91% to win	
Evicted	Oskar; 22.90% to save	Tamer; 32.64% to save	Minna; 15.62% to save	Amanda; 17.49% to save	Salar; 5 of 9 votes to evict	Terhi; 20.48% to save	Matti; 16.72% to save	Stefan; 17.54% to save	Annika; 20.8% to save	Rami; 3 of 5 votes to evict	Netta; 30.61% to save	Sebastian; 32.44% to save	Suvi; 5.52% to win	Mikael; 42.91% to win	
Evicted	Oskar; 22.90% to save	Tamer; 32.64% to save	Minna; 15.62% to save	Amanda; 17.49% to save	Salar; 5 of 9 votes to evict	Terhi; 20.48% to save	Matti; 16.72% to save	Stefan; 17.54% to save	Annika; 20.8% to save	Rami; 3 of 5 votes to evict	Netta; 30.61% to save	Sebastian; 32.44% to save	Janica; 47.54% to win		

=== Notes ===
Housemate was given immunity.
- ^1 No nominations, because Weeks 1 and Week 2 had a "final week voting", where the winner has given immunity in all evictions, always up to a final week. The winner was told to the housemates on 14 October 2011.
- ^2 Veera has two weeks immunity, because she is new in the house. Housemates do not know about this, except for Veera.
- ^3 Salar had already been nominated as breaking rules ongoingly. Also he cannot be involved in Straw Swap and nominate nobody.
- ^4 Six housemates are under of Eviction and that is why Straw Swap is not in this week.
- ^5 Matti broke the rules and was instantly nominated without a change for Straw Swap.
- ^6 Suvi and Annika failed in a task and were instantly nominated without a change for Straw Swap.
- ^7 No nominations because Mikael, Sebastian, Suvi, Annika and Veera failed in a task and were instantly nominated without a change for Straw Swap.
- ^8 The public voted to nominate. On Week 7, the two housemates with the most votes were nominated. On Week 12, the three housemates with the fewest votes were nominated. Then, the non-nominated housemates voted to evict one of them.

== TV rating ==
Show	Viewers
31 August – Kick-off	507,000
4 September	452,000
11 September	472,000
18 September	446,000
25 September	427,000
2 October	428,000
9 October	407,000
16 October	486,000
23 October	476,000
30 October	445,000
6 November	452,000
13 November	482,000
20 November	478,000
