= Big Brother (Norwegian TV series) =

- Official Big Brother Norge 2011 logo
- Also known as: Big Brother Norge
- Presented by: Arve Juritzen (2001–2002); Jannicke Farstad (2001); Annette Young (2002); Trygve Rønningen (2003); Sarah Natasha Melbye (2011)
- No. of seasons: 5
- No. of episodes: 374

Production
- Production locations: Oslo (2001–2003); Stockholm, Sverige (2011)
- Production company: Endemol

Original release
- Network: TVNorge (2001–2003); TV 2 Bliss (2011)
- Release: 24 February 2001 – 4 December 2011

Big Brother Norge was the Norwegian version of reality TV show Big Brother that was aired from 2001 to 2003 on TV Norge for four moderately successful seasons. The fifth and final season was launched in late August 2011 on TV 2 Bliss.

== Overall ==
Seasons		Launch Date	Finale Date	Days	Housemates	Winner	Prize money	Presenter
Original Run
1	Big Brother 2001	24 February 2001	31 May 2001	97	12	Lars Joakim Ringom	1,000,000 NOK	Arve Juritzen
2	Big Brother – Tilbake I Huset	17 November 2001	25 November 2001	9	13	Leena Brekke	None	
3	Big Brother 2002	24 February 2002	2 June 2002	99	15	Verónica Agnes Roso	1,000,000 NOK	Arve Juritzen
4	Big Brother 2003	8 March 2003	15 May 2003	69	15	Eva Lill Baukhol	1,000,000 NOK	Trygve Rønningen
2nd Run
5	Big Brother 2011	29 August 2011	4 December 2011	98	22	Tine Barstad	1,000,000 NOK	Petter Pilgaard; Sarah Natasha Melbye

== Big Brother 1 ==
Season 1 of Big Brother Norge premiered on February 24, 2001 and ran until May 31, 2001. 10 housemates entered the house on launch night with two Intruders immediately following on the second day of the Show. The original housemates then had to decide whom of Natalie and Roy they wanted to keep in the house. Natalie was evicted. First victim of the public voting was Rebekka, who eventually made a return to the show as one of the twists of the season. When Per Morten made the shows only voluntary exit on Day 85 the audience had the chance to vote yet another former evictee back into the house. Since Rebekka already returned and Natalie not recognized as an official housemate by Big Brother (they put her profile off the homepage once she was evicted) the audience had to choose out of Trond, Mónica, Roy and Rodney. With massive support, the latest evictee Rodney was allowed to make a comeback.
Two showmances had huge impact on the show since both resulting couples (Annette and Rodney; Anne Mona and Ramsy) remained in the house until the last week. However it was Lars Joakim Ringom who gained the most popularity and was crowned the winner of the season in a close vote beating runner-up Anita E. Sundt Olsen by 2% only. Both housemates have been quite popular and have never been nominated.
Annette Young, who gained the 3rd runner-up position on final night, eventually became a co-host of future Big Brother Norge seasons.
This was the first time that the rules of a Big Brother edition were changed to a minimum of three housemates being up for eviction on every nomination round in comparison to the usual two.

=== Nominations Table ===
Housemates nominate for 2 points (top of box) and 1 point (bottom of box) and the three or more housemates with the most nomination points face the public vote to evict.

	Week 1	Week 2	Week 4	Week 6	Week 8	Week 10	Week 12	Week 13	Week 14 Final	
Lars Joakim	Natalie	Rebekka, Anita	Monica, Trond	Monica, Anita	Ramsy, Anita	Ramsy, Anne Mona	Per Morten, Ramsy	No; Nominations	Winner (Day 97)	
Anita	Natalie	Rebekka, Per Morten	Lars Joakim, Ramsy	Roy, Monica	Rodney, Per Morten	Rodney, Anne Mona	Rebekka, Anne Mona	No; Nominations	Runner-up (Day 97)	
Rodney	Natalie	Rebekka, Per Morten	Monica, Trond	Roy, Monica	Anita, Per Morten	Anita, Per Morten	Evicted (Day 72)	No; Nominations	Third place (Day 97)	
Anette	Roy	Rebekka, Anita	Monica, Trond	Monica, Roy	Roy, Per Morten	Per Morten, Ramsay	Per Morten, Rebekka	No; Nominations	Fourth place (Day 97)	
Anne Mona	Natalie	Rebekka, Anita	Monica, Trond	Monica, Roy	Per Morten, Roy	Per Morten, Anita	Per Morten, Anita	No; Nominations	Fifth place (Day 97)	
Ramsy	Natalie	Per Morten, Monica	Anita, Monica	Anita, Monica	Anita, Per Morten	Lars Joakim, Anita	Per Morten, Lars Joakim	No; Nominations	Evicted (Day 90)	
Rebekka	Natalie	Trond, Anne Mona	Evicted (Day 16)				Anetta, Anita	Re-Evicted (Day 86)		
Per Morten	Roy	Trond, Anette	Monica, Rodney	Anita, Monica	Anita, Roy	Rodney, Ramsy	Anne Mona, Rebekka	Walked (Day 85)		
Roy	Nominated	Rebekka, Rodney	Anita, Monica	Monica, Ramsy	Per Morten, Ramsy	Evicted (Day 58)				
Monica	Natalie	Rebekka, Anita	Per Morten, Ramsy	Anita, Ramsy	Evicted (Day 44)					
Trond	Natalie	Rebekka, Ramsy	Anita, Rodney	Evicted (Day 30)						
Natalie	Nominated	Evicted (Day 4)								
Notes	^{1}	none				^{2}	^{3}	^{4}	^{4}	
Nominated For Eviction	Natalie, Roy	Anita, Per Morten, Rebekka, Trond	Anita, Monica, Ramsy, Rodney, Trond	Anita, Monica, Roy	Anita, Per Morten, Roy	Anita, Per Morten, Ramsy, Rodney	Anne Mona, Per Morten, Rebekka	Anette, Anne Mona, Anita, Lars Joakim, Ramsy, Rodney	Anette, Anne Mona, Anita, Lars Joakim, Rodney	
Evicted	Natalie; 8 of 10 votes to evict	Rebekka; 56% to evict	Trond; 35% to evict	Monica; 48% to evict	Roy; 58% to evict	Rodney; 34% to evict	Rebekka; 53% to evict	Ramsy; 10% to win	Anne Mona; 12% (out of 5)	Anette; 20% (out of 4)
Evicted	Natalie; 8 of 10 votes to evict	Rebekka; 56% to evict	Trond; 35% to evict	Monica; 48% to evict	Roy; 58% to evict	Rodney; 34% to evict	Rebekka; 53% to evict	Ramsy; 10% to win	Rodney; 29% (out of 3)	Anita; 48% to win
Evicted	Natalie; 8 of 10 votes to evict	Rebekka; 56% to evict	Trond; 35% to evict	Monica; 48% to evict	Roy; 58% to evict	Rodney; 34% to evict	Rebekka; 53% to evict	Ramsy; 10% to win	Lars Joakim; 52% to win	

Notes:
^1 On Day 2 two new Housemates, Natalie and Roy, entered the House. On Day Four the Housemates had to decide which one of them to evict, and Natalie left the House after receiving the most votes.
^2 Rebekka returned to the House on Day 65.
^3 On Day 85 Per Morten left the House voluntarily. He was facing Eviction along with Anne Mona and Rebekka, but all votes for him were discounted and the Eviction left between Anne Mona and Rebekka, with Rebekka leaving after receiving 53% to Anne Mona's 47%. Viewers voted for which Ex-Housemate they wanted to replace Per Morten. They voted for Rodney who re-entered the House on Day 86, shortly after Rebekka's second Eviction. Rodney was chosen with 56% of the vote, to Trond's 17%, Monica's 14% and Roy's 13%.
^4 There were no Nominations this Week, instead all Housemates faced the vote to win.

== Big Brother Norge - Tilbake I Huset ==
Big Brother Norge - Tilbake I Huset (Back in the House) was a spin-off of the first season which was set 100 days after that seasons final and lasted 9 days running from November 17 to November 25, 2001. Several season 1 housemates re-entered the house together with four new personalities: Annika, Christian, Claus and Leena, who competed to become a housemate on the shows next regular season. Since Claus made a voluntary exit halfway through the audience had to choose between the remaining three and voted Leena (real name: Lina) Breeke the winner who was therefore the first known housemate for the next season.
The main highlight of the show was the wedding between season 1 houseguests Ramsy and Mona which marked the first time worldwide that a couple would marry inside a Big Brother house. Boyband Westlife made an appearance as live guests during the wedding and performed.

=== Contestants ===
Anonymous
Contestant	Residence	Occupation	Age
Annika		Frisør	21
Christian		Web Designer	20
Claus		Consultant	27
Leena Brekke		Student	22
All-Stars
Contestant	Residence	Occupation	Age
Anita E. Sundt Olsen	Oslo		25
Anne Mona Hansen	Flekkefjord		24
Monica Sørensen	Oslo		28
Per Morten Witzøe	Oslo		36
Ramsy Suleiman	Ålesund		23
Rebekka Østby	Moss		27
Rodney Omdahl Karlsen	Skien		26
Roy Grønkvist			33
Trond Syversen	Nittedal		35

== Big Brother 2 ==
The second season of Big Brother Norge started on February 24, 2002 and ended on June 2 of the same year. As it was decided on Tilbake I Huset, Leena Brekke, now under her real name Lina, was already certain to move into the house together with 11 others on launch night. Juse like in the other year, two intruders made their way to the house on Day 2: Gro Anita and Espen. Both of them were automatically up for eviction, however, next to them two of the original housemates who received the most nominations, Jan Arne and Verónica were also in danger of leaving the house on what was a double elimination in the first week. Jan Arne and Gro Anita, whose stay in the house only lasted for 2 days, got evicted.

Although being elected by the public to enter the house, Lina found herself in the unlucky position to get nominated by Big Brother in week 2 and immediately getting the boot out of five nominated housemates.
After 99 Days, Verónica Agnes Roso from Lørenskog was voted the winner over Espen Vesterdal Larsen and three others. Both Verónica and Espen have been up for eviction in the very first week and Verónica got nominated even 5 out of the 8 nomination rounds.

=== Nominations Table ===
	Week 1	Week 2	Week 4	Week 6	Week 8	Week 10	Week 12	Week 13	Week 14 Final	
Verónica	Maria; Jan Arne	Verónika-Kathrin; Maria	Maria; Güner	Remi; Jahannes	Remi; Verónika-Kathrin	Johannes; Verónika-Kathrin	Mikki; Mónica	No; Nominations	Winner (Day 99)	
Espen	Nominated	Lise Marie; Verónica	Lise Marie; Johannes	Lise Marie; Verónica	Remi; Kristian	Mónica; Veronika-Kathrin	Mónica; Veronika-Kathrin	No; Nominations	Runner-Up (Day 99)	
Verónika-Kathrin	Kristian; Maria	Remi; Johannes	Remi; Johannes	Lise Marie; Espen	Johannes; Espen	Verónica; Espen	Maria; Espen	No; Nominations	Third place (Day 99)	
Mónica	Johannes; Verónica	Verónica; Johannes	Lise Marie; Johannes	Lise Marie; Johannes	Johannes; Verónica	Johannes; Verónica	Maria; Verónica	No; Nominations	Fourth place (Day 99)	
Kristian	Verónica; Remi	Verónica; Güner	Dennis; Verónica	Lise Marie; Johannes	Dennis; Verónica	Verónica; Johannes	Mikki; Dennis	No; Nominations	Fifth place (Day 99)	
Mikki	Not in house					Johannes; Verónica	Verónica; Dennis	No; Nominations	Evicted (Day 96)	
Dennis	Jan Arne; Line	Remi; Güner	Güner; Remi	Remi; Johannes	Johannes; Remi	Kristian; Mónica	Mikki; Maria	No; Nominations	Evicted (Day 96)	
Maria	Verónika-Kathrin; Jan Arne	Remi; Verónika-Kathrin	Remi; Dennis	Espen; Dennis	Dennis; Verónika-Kathrin	Verónika-Kathrin; Kristian	Dennis; Mónica	Evicted (Day 89)		
Johannes	Güner; Mónica	Güner; Mónica	Güner; Remi	Remi; Verónica	Remi; Mónica	Dennis; Maria	Evicted (Day 75)			
Remi	Verónica; Jan Arne	Verónica; Lisa Marie	Maria; Verónica	Lise Marie; Verónica	Espen; Johannes	Evicted (Day 61)				
Lise Marie	Remi; Verónica	Remi; Espen	Remi; Espen	Mónica; Verónica	Evicted (Day 47)					
Güner	Lise Marie; Dennis	Johannes; Espen	Johannes; Verónica	Evicted (Day 33)						
Line	Verónica; Johannes	Remi; Johannes	Evicted (Day 19)							
Jan Arne	Dennis; Verónica	Evicted (Day 5)								
Gro Anita	Nominated	Evicted (Day 5)								
Notes	none			none						
Nominated For Eviction	Espen, Gro Anita, Jan Arne; Verónica	Johannes, Line, Remi, Verónica, Verónika-Kathrin	Güner, Johannes, Kristian, Lise Marie, Remi	Espen, Johannes, Lise Marie, Remi, Verónica	Dennis, Johannes, Remi	Johannes, Verónica, Verónika-Kathrin	Dennis, Maria, Mikki, Mónica	Dennis, Espen, Kristian, Mikki, Mónica, Verónica, Verónika-Kathrin	Espen, Kristian, Mónica, Verónica, Verónika-Kathrin	
Evicted	Gro Anita; 37% to evict	Line; 35% to evict	Güner; 30% to evict	Lise Marie; 34% to evict	Remi	Johannes; 37% to evict	Maria	Dennis; 8% to win	Kristian; 8% to win	Mónica; 12.6% to win
Evicted	Jan Arne; 34% to evict	Line; 35% to evict	Güner; 30% to evict	Lise Marie; 34% to evict	Remi	Johannes; 37% to evict	Maria	Mikki; 9% to win	Verónika-Kathrin; 18.8% to win	Espen; 27.9% to win
Evicted	Jan Arne; 34% to evict	Line; 35% to evict	Güner; 30% to evict	Lise Marie; 34% to evict	Remi	Johannes; 37% to evict	Maria	Mikki; 9% to win	Verónica; 32.7% to win	

Notes:
^5 Line and Verónika-Kathrin were automatically nominated for discussing nominations.
^6 Lise-Marie and Kristian were automatically nominated for cheating in the weekly task.
^7 There were no Nominations this Week, instead all Housemates faced the vote to win.

== Big Brother 3 - Next Generation ==
Under the Name Big Brother Norge - Next Generation the show returned in its third year running from March 8 to May 15, 2003. Running for only 69 days, it was the shortest main season of the show and saw a major twist in a house divide which was already used in several Big Brother versions worldwide before: The household was split into two parts with one living on the luxurious side of the house having access to privileges like a jacuzzi, hot water and comfort beds while the other side was lacking of all of this and was forced to live with basics only.
In this edition, the audience got the chance to nominate their two most disliked housemates with the most vote getter receiving two, and the 2nd most vote getter receiving one point for nomination.
Although lasting for only ten weeks the season saw the most voluntary exits in the history of Big Brother Norge with three male housemates walking and therefore making place for three replacement contestants.
With 39.4% to win Eva Lill Baukhol triumphed over Halvor Kvikstad, who achieved 36.4% in a close race.
Three years after his participation contestant Ronny Furnes was found dead on May 30, 2007 at the age of 37.

=== Nominations table ===
	Week 1	Week 2	Week 4	Week 5	Week 6	Week 7	Week 8	Week 9	Week 10 Final	
Eva Lill	Julian; Therese	Halvor; Morten	Halvor; Henriette	Henriette; Halvor	Henriette; Stina	Stina; Thor	? ?	No nominations	Winner	
Halvor	Anita; Julian	Pia; Ronny	Anita; Therese	Therese; Stina	Therese; Stina	Thor; Morten	? ?	No nominations	Runner up	
Stina	Not in House		Henrik; Eva Lill	Henrik; Eva Lill	Therese; Eva Lill	Thor; Eva Lill	? ?	No nominations	Third place	
Rune	Not in House		Eva Lill; Anita	Therese; Stina	Therese; Morten	Stina; Thor	? ?	No nominations	Fourth place	
Morten	Eva Lill; Henrik	Pia; Ronny	Anita; Henriette	Henriette; Ronny	Henriette; Eva Lill	Thor; Henriette	? ?	No nominations	Evicted (Day 62)	
Henriette	Agnethe; Pia	Henrik; Pia	Henrik; Eva Lill	Henrik; Therese	Therese; Morten	Thor; Morten	? ?	Evicted (Day 55)		
Thor	Not in House				Halvor; Morten	Stina; Eva Lill	Evicted (Day 48)			
Therese	Eva Lill; Henrik	Pia; Halvor	Halvor; Ronny	Halvor; Ronny	Henriette; Stina	Evicted (Day 41)				
Henrik	Morten; Agnethe	Anita; Morten	Anita; Henriette	Stina; Henriette	Evicted (Day 34)					
Ronny	Agnethe; Henrik	Henriette; Halvor	Henriette; Halvor	Halvor; Henrik	Walked (Day 34)					
Anita	Pia; Agnethe	Henrik; Halvor	Halvor; Henrik	Evicted (Day 27)						
Pia	Halvor; Therese	Henriette; Ronny	Evicted (Day 19)							
Kim	Agnethe; Anita	Eva Lill; Henrik	Walked (Day 15)							
Julian	Morten; Henriette	Walked (Day 10)								
Agnethe	Henriette; Halvor	Evicted (Day 5)								
Public nominations	none	Henrik; Pia	Anita; Eva Lill	none		Thor; Morten	none			
Up for eviction	Agnethe; Henrik	Halvor; Henrik; Pia	Anita; Halvor; Henriette	Halvor; Henriette; Henrik; Therese	Henriette; Morten; Stina; Therese	Morten; Stina; Thor	Henriette; Rune; Stina	All housemates		
Evicted	Agnethe; 57% to evict	Pia; 41% to evict	Anita; 39% to evict	Henrik; 31% to evict	Therese; 50% to evict	Thor; 74% to evict	Henriette; 40% to evict	Morten; Fewest votes (out of 5) to win	Rune; 5.2% to win	Stina; 19% to win
Evicted	Agnethe; 57% to evict	Pia; 41% to evict	Anita; 39% to evict	Henrik; 31% to evict	Therese; 50% to evict	Thor; 74% to evict	Henriette; 40% to evict	Morten; Fewest votes (out of 5) to win	Halvor; 36.4% to win	Eva Lill; 39.4% to win

== Big Brother 4 ==
The series started on Monday 29 August 2011 and was aired on TV 2 Bliss for 98 days with the finale on 4 December 2011. TV2 bought the Norwegian television rights for Big Brother and will air a fourth season in 2011. The main presenters are Petter Pilgaard and Sarah Natasha Melbye. Tine Barstad won series on 4 December 2011.

=== Housemates ===
Name	Age	Hometown	Occupation	Marital Status
Andreas Monge	22	Vigrestad	Engineer	Dating
Andreas Paulsen	28	Oslo	Chef	Single
Amir Geir Spjøtvold Mian	30	Haugesund	Store Assistant	Cohabiting
Caroline Aas	24	Porsgrunn	Student	Single
Joakim Myhre Eik	22	Uskedalen	Care assistant	Single
Janica Kortman	30	Kirkkonummi, Finland	Accountant	Single
Kristoffer Tafjord	23	Oslo	Investor	Single
Lena Charlotte Westby	24	Brumunddal	Model, Drift Driver	Cohabiting
Linn Therese Jensen	23	Tønsberg	Student	Single
Magnus Teie Færgestad	23	Sørumsand	Fiber fitter	Single
Marius Gamst Helgesen	22	Oslo	Unemployed	Cohabiting
Monica Cordelia Røsvassbukt	26	Oslo	Store assistant	Single
Roberto Obando	30	Oslo	Offshore engineering	Single
Siv Anita Austad	24	Trondheim	Paramedic, Student	Single
Sunna Ingudottir	22	Stavanger	Receptionist	Single
Tiia Maria Sorjonen	21	Oslo	Hairdresser	Single
Tine Linnerud Barstad	23	Lillehammer	Assistant	Single

=== Nominations table ===
	Week 1	Week 2		Week 3		Week 4	Week 5	Week 6	Week 7	Week 8	Week 9	Week 10	Week 11	Week 12	Week 13	Week 14	
Tine	Linn; N/A	Sunna; N/A		—N/a	Tone	Linn; N/A	David; N/A	Nominated	Marius, Marius, Marius	David; N/A	Caroline; Lena	Caroline; Magnus	Magnus; Roberto	Lena; David	No; Nominations	Winner (Day 100)	
Lena	A.Monge; Kristoffer	—N/a		—N/a	Tone	—N/a	—N/a	No; Nominations	A.Paulsen, A.Paulsen, A.Paulsen	—N/a	Silje; A.Paulsen	—N/a	Tine; Joakim	David ¿Silje?	Exempt	Runner up (Day 100)	
Roberto	Monica; N/A	—N/a		—N/a	Tone	Marius; Tiia	A.Paulsen; N/A	No; Nominations	Tine, Tine, N/A	—N/a	Silje; A.Paulsen	Silje; N/A	Silje; Tine	Silje; Tine	No; Nominations	Third place (Day 100)	
Silje	Not in house	In The; Farm		Exempt	Nominated	Tine; N/A	Benedikte; N/A	Nominated	Caroline, Caroline, N/A	David; N/A	A.Paulsen; David	Lena; N/A	Lena; Magnus	Lena; Joakim	No; Nominations	Fourth place ( Day 100)	
Joakim	—N/a	—N/a		Siv Anita; A.Paulsen	Tone	—N/a	—N/a	No; Nominations	N/A, Refused, N/A	—N/a	Silje; David	Caroline; Siv Anita	Siv Anita; Magnus	Lena; David	No; Nominations	Evicted (Day 92)	
David	Not in house	In The; Farm		Exempt	Nominated	Tine; N/A	A.Paulsen; N/A	Nominated	Evicted (Day 43)	A.Paulsen; Siv Anita	A.Paulsen; Tine	Silje; N/A	Siv Anita; Lena	Lena ¿Silje?	No; Nominations	Re-evicted (Day 92)	
Magnus	Linn; Tine	—N/a		—N/a	Tone	—N/a	—N/a	No; Nominations	N/A, Tine, A.Paulsen	—N/a	Tine; Silje	Silje; Tine	Silje; Tine	Silje; Tine	Evicted (Day 85)		
Siv Anita	—N/a	Tine; Linn		Tine; Tiia	Tone	Linn; N/A	—N/a	No; Nominations	Silje, Tine, Marius	—N/a	In Big Brother; Finland House	—N/a	Joakim; David	Evicted (Day 78)			
Caroline	—N/a	—N/a		Tine; A.Monge	Tone	—N/a	Benedikte; Tine	No; Nominations	Silje, Tine, A.Paulsen	—N/a	Tine; Silje	Tine; N/A	Evicted (Day 71)				
A.Paulsen	—N/a	—N/a		—N/a	Tone	Linn; N/A	David; N/A	No; Nominations	Silje, Lena, Marius	David; Silje	David; Silje	Evicted (Day 64)					
Tiia	—N/a	—N/a		—N/a	Tone	Tine; Linn	Tine; Benedikte	No; Nominations	Silje, N/A, N/A	N/A	Evicted (Day 57)						
Marius	—N/a	Tine; Sunna		Tine; Tiia	Tone	—N/a	Tine; N/A	Nominated	Tine, N/A, Tiia	Evicted (Day 50)							
A.Monge	—N/a	—N/a		—N/a	Tone	—N/a	—N/a	Walked (Day 39)									
Benedikte	Not in house	In The; Farm		Exempt	Nominated	Tine; N/A	Tine; N/A	Evicted (Day 36)									
Linn	Tine; Marius	Tine; Sunna		N/A	Tone	A.Paulsen; Tine	Evicted (Day 29)										
Tone	Not in house	In The; Farm		Exempt	Nominated	Evicted (Day 22)											
Kristoffer	—N/a	—N/a		—N/a	Tone	Evicted (Day 22)											
Sunna	—N/a	Linn; Tine		Evicted (Day 15)													
Terje	Not in house	In The; Farm		Evicted (Day 15)													
Jon	Not in house	In The; Farm		Evicted (Day 15)													
Amir	Linn; Monica	Ejected (Day 9)															
Monica	Tine; Marius	Evicted (Day 8)															
Janica	In Big Brother; Finland House									Exempt	A.Paulsen; Joakim	In Big Brother; Finland House					
Big Brother Challenge	none									Janica* -> Siv Anita	none						
Public's nominations	none									Tiia (1.61%)	none						
Power of immunity	none			Linn; Newbies	none	Newbies	none		Tine (62.58%)	A.Paulsen (20.55%)	Magnus	none			Lena	none	
Nominated	Linn, Monica, Tine	Benedikte, David, Jon, Silje, Terje, Tone	Sunna, Tine	A.Paulsen, Kristoffer, Tine	Benedikte, David, Silje, Tone	A.Paulsen, Linn, Magnus, Tine	Benedikte, Tine	David, Marius, Silje, Tine	Joakim, Marius, Silje, ~~Tine~~	~~A.Paulsen,~~; David, ~~Tiia~~	A.Paulsen, Silje	Caroline, Silje, Tine	Magnus, Silje, Siv Anita, Tine	Lena, Magnus, Silje, Tine	David, Joakim, Roberto, Silje, Tine	All housemates	
Walked	none							A. Monge	none								
Ejected	none	Amir		none													
Evicted	Monica; Fewest votes to save	Jon; Fewest votes to enter	Sunna; Fewest votes to save	Kristoffer; Fewest votes to save	Tone; Chosen to evict	Linn; Fewest votes to save	Benedikte; Fewest votes to save	David; Fewest votes to save	Marius; Fewest votes to save	Tiia; Fewest votes to save	A.Paulsen; Fewest votes to save	Caroline; Fewest votes to save	Siv Anita; Fewest votes to save	Magnus; Fewest votes to save	David; Fewest votes to save	Silje; Fewest votes (out of 4)	Roberto; Fewest votes (out of 3)
Evicted	Monica; Fewest votes to save	Terje; Fewest votes to enter	Sunna; Fewest votes to save	Kristoffer; Fewest votes to save	Tone; Chosen to evict	Linn; Fewest votes to save	Benedikte; Fewest votes to save	David; Fewest votes to save	Marius; Fewest votes to save	Tiia; Fewest votes to save	A.Paulsen; Fewest votes to save	Caroline; Fewest votes to save	Siv Anita; Fewest votes to save	Magnus; Fewest votes to save	Joakim; Fewest votes to save	Lena; Fewest votes (out of 2)	Tine; Most votes to win

=== Ratings ===
Show	Date	Viewers	Share
Launch	29 August	533.000	N/A
Monica eviction	4 September	300.000	N/A
Sunna eviction	11 September	N/A	N/A

== See also ==
- Big Brother (franchise)
