= Big Brother Africa season 3 =

Big Brother Africa
- Season 3
- No. of days: 91
- No. of housemates: 12
- Winner: Ricco
- Runner-up: Hazel

Season chronology
- ← Previous; Season 2 Next → Season 4

Big Brother Africa 3 is the third series of the Big Brother Africa reality television show produced by Endemol. The season began airing on 24 August 2008 and run 91 days ending 23 November 2008.

As with the previous series, the show involves 12 countries within Africa (Angola, Botswana, Ghana, Kenya, Malawi, Namibia, Nigeria, South Africa, Tanzania, Uganda, Zambia & Zimbabwe) each producing a contestant living in an isolated house in Johannesburg, South Africa, while trying to avoid being evicted by viewers and ultimately winning a large cash prize at the end of the show. The show is filmed in a house at Sasani Studios in Lyndhurst, Johannesburg. This season marks the closest vote in the history of the Big Brother series in Africa.

== Production ==
=== The House ===
Architecturally, the House in this series of Big Brother was hardly unchanged from the previous one. The House was, however, completely revamped in the inside with brand new decor and an edgier look. The kitchen together with the dining area and the lounge had a Garden of Eden theme with artificial grass on the floor and green plants crawling on the surrounding walls. The bathroom, particularly the shower, had clocks all over the walls to create a feeling of paranoia - the clocks also did not work. The bedrooms were also switched from the previous season, meaning the girls had to sleep in the bedroom closer to the kitchen whilst the boys had to sleep in the bedroom closer to the bathroom. The House also boasted a large backyard, with the jacuzzi being replaced by an even bigger irregular-shaped pool, a Diary Room where the Housemates were strongly encouraged to voice their true opinions and feelings, and a Storeroom where most of the Housemates' belongings were kept.

=== Nominations ===
Each week housemates nominate two other housemates for eviction in the Diary Room and must give justified and clear reasons. The Head of House may be nominated for eviction as well. After the nominees are revealed to the House, the current Head of House can save a nominee for eviction including themselves if they are nominated and replace the saved nominee with another nominee. While this is revealed to the viewers, the House does not know of the decision until eviction night Sunday.

=== Voting ===
Each eviction week viewers in the 12 participating countries vote to eliminate a housemate they do not like. The majority for each country will be counted as a vote. In addition to the 12 participating countries, all other countries not participating in the show can still vote for who they would like to eliminate. The "other countries" counts for the 13th vote.

=== Head of House ===
The Head of House (or HOH) is a position in the house that gives one housemate each week special privileges over the other Housemates. It is a power similar to both the Head of Household and the Power of Veto used in the American, Brazilian and British version of Big Brother. During nominations, the Head of House can be nominated for eviction by their fellow housemates. Then the Head of House can choose to save a nominee or save themselves from eviction and nominate a new housemate for eviction. While the decision is released to the public, the House will not know of the decision until Sunday, eviction night.

== Housemates ==
Name	Real/Full Name	Age	Occupation	Country	Day entered	Day exited	Status
Ricco	Ricardo David Ferreira Venancio	21	Bank employee	Angola	1	91	Winner
Hazel	Hazel Warren	25	Personal assistant	Malawi	1	91	Runner-up
Munya	Munyaradzi Chidzonga	22	Actor	Zimbabwe	1	91	3rd Place
Tawana	Tawana Lebani	31	Microbiologist	Botswana	1	84	Evicted
Thami	Thamsanqa Prusent	26	Entrepreneur	South Africa	1	77	Evicted
Morris	Morris Herbert Mugisha	29	Photographer and model	Uganda	1	70	Evicted
Takondwa	Takondwa Nkonjera	25	Musician	Zambia	1	63	Evicted
Mimi	Wilhelmina Abu-Andani	27	Personal assistant	Ghana	1	56	Evicted
Sheila	Sheila Patricia Kwamboka	23	Student	Kenya	1	49	Evicted
Uti	Uti Nwachukwu	26	Student and model	Nigeria	1	42	Evicted
Lucille	Lucille Naobes	21	Unemployed	Namibia	1	35	Evicted
Latoya	Latoya Lyakurwa	21	Secretary	Tanzania	1	28	Evicted

== Swap with the Big Brother Finland house ==
Johan, from Finnish Big Brother season 4 swapped with Munya on the week 9.

== Hero & Zero Vote ==
On Day 2, Housemates were asked to name 2 housemates one of which they would consider their "Hero" the person they would most like to live with for the full 91 days and one that they would consider a "Zero" the person that they thought deserved to leave the house as soon as possible. The first name they gave was that of their "hero" and the second name they gave was that of their "zero". These nominations did not count and no one was put up for the public vote.

Housemate	Hero	Zero	Points
Hazel	Mimi	Takondwa	2
Latoya	Hazel	Tawana	0
Lucille	Thami	Thami	-2
Mimi	Sheila	Thami	1
Morris	Ricco	Takondwa	-2
Munya	Sheila	Morris	1
Ricco	Munya	Morris	2
Sheila	Ricco	Tawana	3
Takondwa	Takondwa	Lucille	0
Tawana	Sheila	Lucille	-3
Thami	Hazel	Uti	-1
Uti	Takondwa	Tawana	-1

== Nominations Table ==
A record of the nominations cast, stored in a nominations table, shows how each Housemate nominated other Housemates throughout his or her time in the house. The Head of House can choose to save a nominated Housemate each week and nominate another Housemate to face the public vote. Twists to the normal nominations process are noted, such as immunity from nomination and eviction (referred to as "exempt").

	Week 2	Week 3	Week 4	Week 5	Week 6	Week 7	Week 8	Week 9	Week 10	Week 11	Week 12	Week 13 Final		Nominations received
Ricco	Morris, Thami	Hazel, Tawana	No; Nominations	Takondwa, Tawana	Takondwa, Tawana	Hazel, Takondwa	Takondwa, Thami	Morris, Thami	Hazel, Thami	Thami, Hazel	Tawana, Hazel	Winner (Day 91)		19
Hazel	Ricco, Takondwa	Mimi, Munya	No; Nominations	Mimi, Takondwa	Munya, Ricco	Sheila, Takondwa	Mimi, Munya	Ricco, Takondwa	Morris, Munya	Munya, Ricco	Tawana, Ricco	Runner-up (Day 91)		20
Munya	Lucille, Ricco	Hazel, Latoya	No; Nominations	Ricco, Takondwa	Takondwa, Uti	Sheila, Takondwa	Mimi, Thami	In Big Brother; Finland House	Hazel, Thami	Hazel, Thami	Hazel, Ricco	Third place (Day 91)		12
Tawana	Lucille, Thami	Lucille, Thami	Nominated	Mimi, Ricco	Mimi, Morris	Mimi, Sheila	Thami, Mimi	Ricco, Takondwa	Morris, Thami	Thami, Hazel	Ricco, Hazel	Evicted (Day 84)		15
Thami	Ricco, Uti	Sheila, Tawana	No; Nominations	Ricco, Uti	Munya, Mimi	Hazel, Takondwa	Munya, Takondwa	Morris, Ricco	Morris, Ricco	Ricco, Munya	Evicted (Day 77)			23
Morris	Lucille, Takondwa	Sheila, Thami	No; Nominations	Munya, Ricco	Ricco, Takondwa	Hazel, Tawana	Mimi, Takondwa	Takondwa, Tawana	Hazel, Munya	Evicted (Day 70)				14
Takondwa	Morris, Hazel	Latoya, Uti	No; Nominations	Lucille, Uti	Thami, Uti	Tawana, Thami	Thami, Ricco	Thami, Tawana	Evicted (Day 63)					23
Mimi	Morris, Thami	Sheila, Uti	No; Nominations	Hazel, Uti	Hazel, Uti	Takondwa, Tawana	Thami, Takondwa	Evicted (Day 56)						11
Sheila	Morris, Thami	Morris, Tawana	No; Nominations	Hazel, Morris	Hazel, Morris	Tawana, Thami	Evicted (Day 49)							9
Uti	Lucille, Mimi	Munya, Latoya	No; Nominations	Hazel, Takondwa	Munya, Takondwa	Evicted (Day 42)								10
Lucille	Morris, Thami	Latoya, Tawana	No; Nominations	Sheila, Uti	Evicted (Day 35)									6
Latoya	Sheila, Takondwa	Sheila, Tawana	Nominated	Evicted (Day 28)										4
Notes	1	2		3	4	5	none	6	none		7	8, 9		
Head of House	Tawana	Ricco	Lucille	Takondwa	Takondwa	Morris	Morris	Tawana	Tawana	Tawana	Munya	none		
Nominated (pre-HoH)	Morris, Thami	Latoya, Sheila, Tawana	none	Ricco, Takondwa, Uti	Munya, Takondwa, Uti	Hazel, Sheila, Takondwa, Tawana	Mimi, Takondwa, Thami	Ricco, Takondwa	Hazel, Morris, Thami	Hazel, Thami	Hazel, Ricco	none		
Saved	none		none	Takondwa	Takondwa	Takondwa	none				Ricco	none		
Against public vote	Morris, Thami	Latoya, Sheila, Tawana	Latoya, Tawana	Lucille, Ricco, Uti	Munya, Ricco, Uti	Hazel, Ricco, Sheila, Tawana	Mimi, Takondwa, Thami	Ricco, Takondwa	Hazel, Morris, Thami	Hazel, Thami	Hazel, Tawana	Hazel, Munya, Ricco		
Evicted	Morris; Thami chosen to fake evict	Latoya; 10 of 13 to fake evict	Latoya; 11 of 13 to evict	Lucille; 11 of 13 to evict	Uti; 7 of 13 to evict	Sheila; 10 of 13 to evict	Mimi; 10 of 13 to evict	Takondwa; 11 of 13 to evict	Morris; 8 of 13 to evict	Thami; 11 of 13 to evict	Tawana; 10 of 13 to evict	Munya; 1 of 13 (22.60%) to win	Hazel; 6 of 13 (38.60%) to win	
Evicted	Morris; Thami chosen to fake evict	Tawana; 3 of 13 to fake evict	Latoya; 11 of 13 to evict	Lucille; 11 of 13 to evict	Uti; 7 of 13 to evict	Sheila; 10 of 13 to evict	Mimi; 10 of 13 to evict	Takondwa; 11 of 13 to evict	Morris; 8 of 13 to evict	Thami; 11 of 13 to evict	Tawana; 10 of 13 to evict	Ricco; 6 of 13 (38.80%) to win		

=== Notes ===
- ^1 On Day 8, Housemates were asked to nominate two housemates for eviction. These nominations did count and Morris and Thami were nominated for eviction but the eviction will be fake. The housemates were not told the nominations were fake. After the nominations were done, the housemates were told which housemates had received the highest number of votes.
- ^2 On Day 21 there was a fake double eviction. The two housemates who have been evicted (Latoya and Tawana), have been sent to the big brother rubbish dump. On day 28, one of them will be evicted permanently, while the other will be returned to the house. The other housemates do not know that one of their housemates will be returning to them.
- ^3 The Head of House Takondwa chose to save himself from nomination, and replace himself with Lucille.
- ^4 The Head of House Takondwa chose to save himself from nomination, and replace himself with Ricco.
- ^5 The Head of House Morris chose to save Takwonda from nomination and replace him with Ricco.
- ^6 Munya was exempt from nominations and immune from eviction this week as he was in the Big Brother Finland house when nominations took place.
- ^7 The Head of House Munya chose to save Ricco from nomination and replace him with Tawana.
- ^8 In the final week viewers were voting for who they wanted to see win the show instead of who they wanted to evict.
- ^9 Due to a 6-6 deadlock between Hazel and Ricco, in accordance with the rules of Big Brother Africa, Ricco won as the housemate with the largest percentage of votes cast.
