= Vappu Pimiä =

Finnish broadcaster (born 1978)

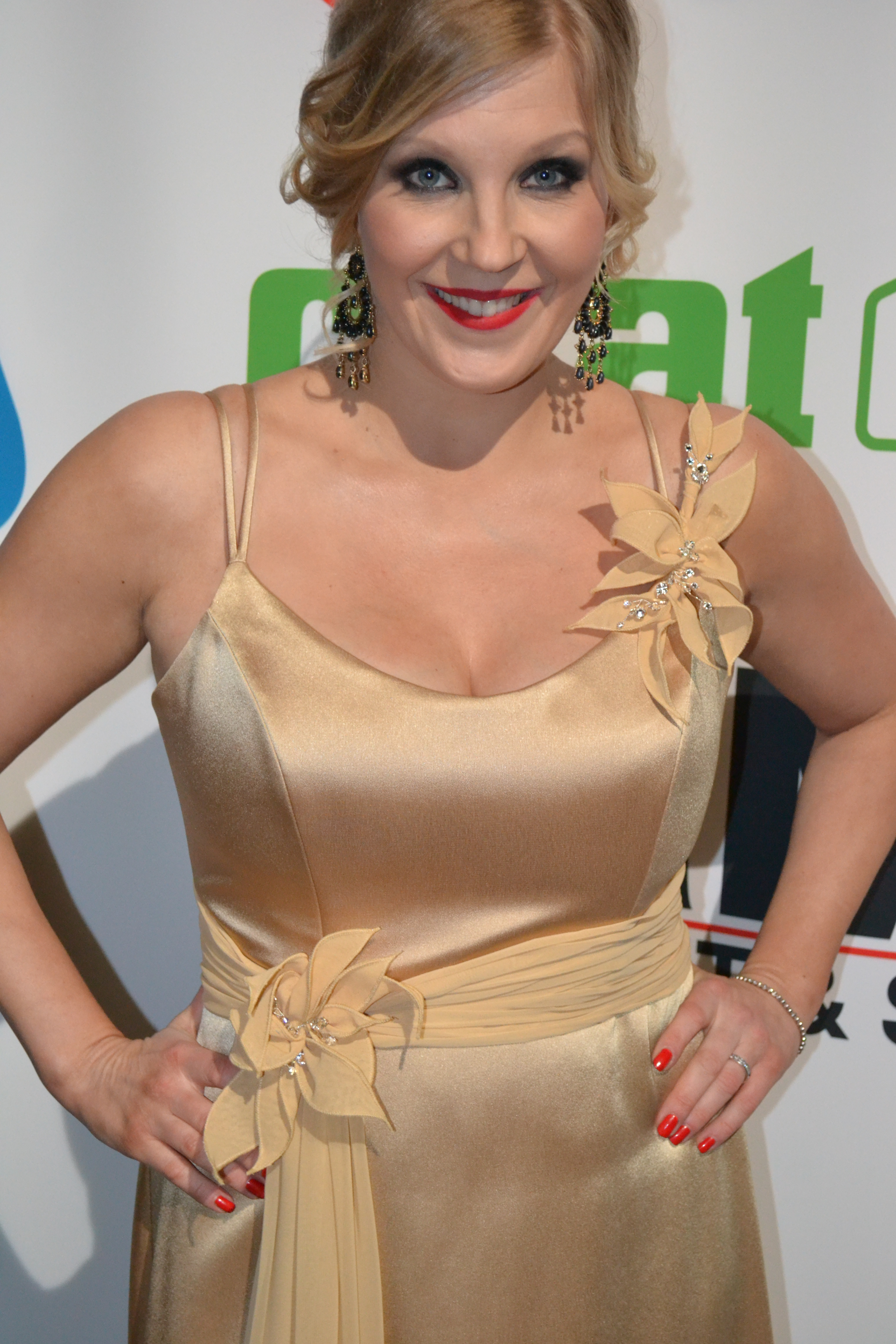
Vappu Pimiä in 2013 Jussi Awards.

Vappu Marjaana Pimiä (born May 16, 1978) is a Finnish radio personality and television hostess. She has been awarded as the best female television personality at the Kultainen TV Awards in 2009 and 2010.

Pimiä is best known as a hostess in the Finnish version of Big Brother. She hosted Big Brother Extra from 2005 to 2006 (first two seasons) and then Big Brother Talk Show from 2007 to 2009 (seasons 3–5). On November 29, 2009, she announced that she has decided not to return as a hostess next season. She was later replaced by Susanna Laine, who is a close friend to Pimiä.

In the spring of 2008, Vappu Pimiä was a competitor in the third season of Tanssii tähtien kanssa (a Finnish version of Dancing with the Stars) with Jani Rasimus. They were the fifth couple to be eliminated. In January, 2009, it was announced that Pimiä would host the fourth season of the series with Marco Bjurström. Pimiä continued as a hostess in the show's fifth season, but Bjurström was replaced by actor Mikko Leppilampi. Pimiä also had her own talk show Vappu tähtien kanssa (Vappu with the Stars) based on Strictly Come Dancing: It Takes Two in 2010. The two continued as hosts in the series' sixth season in 2011. Pimiä left the show after the sixth season due to her pregnancy.

A new live talk show Korkojen kera hosted by Pimiä and Jenni Pääskysaari premiered in January 2011. The series was supposed to return for its fourth season in the fall of 2012, but was eventually put on a hiatus after Pimiä announced her pregnancy in March, 2012. The series is expected to return in early 2013.

Pimiä is married to Teemu Huuhtanen, with whom she lived in Los Angeles in 2011. Their first daughter was born on October 10, 2012 and second daughter in 2015. Pimiä joined the Finnish Orthodox Church in 2025.
