= List of reality television show franchises (A–G) =

The following is a list of reality television show franchises that have become franchises with production of local versions around the world, from A through G. See also List of reality television show franchises (H–Z).

== La Academia ==
Original name: La Academia
Origin: Mexico
Date started: June 30, 2002
Creator: Giorgio Aresu
First network to broadcast: Azteca 13
First country to adapt: Malaysia

International Version
Region	Local name	Channel	Winner	Main Presenters
Central America	La Academia Centroamérica	Azteca Guatemala	Season 1, 2013: May Velasquez	Carlos Guerrero (season 1); Celina Chanta (season 1); Gustavo Vallecillo (season 1)
Greece	House of Fame	Skai TV	Season 1, 2021: Stefanos Pitsiniagas	Eleni Foureira
Indonesia	Akademi Fantasi Indosiar	Indosiar	Season 1, 2003: Veri Affandi; Season 2, 2004: Theodora Meilani Setyawati; Season 3, 2004: Putu Sutha Natawijaya; Season 4, 2005: Ade Alfonso; Season 5, 2006: Tri Widi Nugroho; Season 6, 2013: Stefanny Patilaya	Adi Nugroho (Season 1 - Season 6); Najib Ali (Season 4); Bianca Liza(Season 6)
Indonesia	AFI Junior	Indosiar	Season 1, 2004: Samuel Dharmawan; Season 2, 2004-2005: Deasy; Season 3, 2005: Adi; Season 4, 2008: Teuku Ryzki Muhammad	Adi Nugroho (Season 1 - Season 6); Najib Ali (Season 4); Bianca Liza(Season 6)
Indonesia	La Academia Junior Indonesia	SCTV	Season 1, 2014: Kirana Anandita; Season 2, 2015: Ruri	Adi Nugroho (Season 1 - Season 6); Najib Ali (Season 4); Bianca Liza(Season 6)
Malaysia	Akademi Fantasia	Astro Ria	Season 1, 2003: Vincent Chong Ying-Cern; Season 2, 2004: Ahmad Zahid Baharuddin; Season 3, 2005: Asmawi Ani; Season 4, 2006: Mohammad Faizal Ramly; Season 5, 2007: Norsyarmilla Jirin; Season 6, 2008: Stracie Angie Anam; Season 7, 2009: Mohd Hafiz Mohd Suip; Season 8, 2010: Ahmad Shahir Zawawi; Season 9, 2011: Hazama Ahmad Azmi; Season 10, 2013: Faizul Sany; Season 11, 2014: Firman Bansir; Season 12, 2015: Sufi Rashid; Season 13, 2016: Amir Masdi; Megastar 2017: Idayu	Aznil Nawawi (Season 1-Season 5, season 9 & Megastar); Jimmy Shanley (season 8); Sarimah Ibrahim (season 6-season 8); AC Mizal (season 6-season 7); Seelan Paul(season 1); Zizan Razak (New Version, season 10 AF 2013-2016)
Paraguay	La Academia	Telefuturo	Season 1, 2013: Marilina Bogado	Dani Da Rosa (season 1)
Singapore	Sunsilk Academy Fantasia	StarHub TV	Season 1, 2012: Hui Xian	Louis Wu & Ophelia Su Bei Ru (season 1)
Thailand	True Academy Fantasia	True Visions	Season 1, 2004: Vit, Pacharapol Jantieng; Season 2, 2005:Aof, Supanat Chalermchaichareonkij; Season 3, 2006: Tui, Kiatkamol Lata; Season 4, 2007: Nat, Nat Sakdatorn; Season 5, 2008: Natthew, Nat Thewphaingam; Season 6, 2009: Zani, Nipaporn Thitithanakarn; Season 7, 2010: Por, Aunnop Tongborrisut; Season 8, 2011: Ton, Thanasit Chaturapush; Season 9, 2012: Ice, Pornpassorn Chaianannithi; Season 10, 2013: Tungbeer, Phurivach Teerachad; Season 11, 2014: Aim, Sathida Pinsinchai; Season 12, 2015: Max, Apisorn Sukawatnasai; Season 13, 2026: Jayjay, Chanita Baisamut	Settha Sirachaya (Seasons 1-12) Sanya Kunakorn (Season 13-present)
United States	La Academia USA	Azteca América	Season 1, 2005-2006: Mariana Vargas	Alan Tacher (season 1); Fernando del Solar (season 1)

== The Amazing Race ==
Original name: The Amazing Race
Origin: USA
Date started: September 5, 2001
Creators: Bertram van Munster, Elise Doganieri
First network to broadcast: CBS
First country to adapt: Asian continent

Currently airing (0)
An upcoming season (5)
No longer airing (10)
Status unknown (0)

Country/Region	Local title	Network(s)	Winner(s)	Presenter(s)	Prize(s)
Asia	The Amazing Race Asia	AXN Asia	Season 1, 2006–07: Zabrina Fernandez and Joe Jer Tee; Season 2, 2007–08: Adrian Yap and Collin Low; Season 3 (Toughest Race Ever), 2008: Vince Chung and Sam Wu; Season 4, 2010: Richard Hardin and Richard Herrera; Season 5, 2016: Parul Shah and Maggie Wilson	Allan Wu; Tara Basro (5)	US$100,000
Australia; New Zealand (3)	The Amazing Race Australia	Seven Network (1–3); TVNZ (TV2) (3); Network 10 (4–)	Season 1, 2011: Tyler Atkins and Nathan Joliffe; Season 2, 2012: Shane Haw and Andrew Thoday; Season 3 (Australia v New Zealand), 2014: Daniel Little and Ryan Thomas; Season 4, 2019: Tim and Rod Sattler-Jones; Season 5, 2021: Brendon Crawley and Jackson Dening; Season 6 (Around the World), 2022: Heath Curry and Toni Hilland; Season 7 (Celebrity Edition), 2023: Alli Simpson and Angie Simpson, Darren McMullen and Tristan Dougan, Emma Watkins and Haley Watkins (Note: The final three teams were declared joint winners, after agreeing to step on the Finish Line mat together.); Season 8 (Celebrity Edition), 2024: Tai "Bam Bam" and Logan Tuivasa; Season 9 (Celebrity Edition), 2025: Stephen and Bernard Curry; Season 10 (Celebrity Edition), 2027: Upcoming season	Grant Bowler (1–3); Beau Ryan (4–); Scott Tweedie (6)	A$250,000 (1–6) two Isuzu vehicles (6) A$100,000 for charity (Celeb)
Brazil	The Amazing Race: A Corrida Milionária; The Amazing Race: The Millionaire Race	RedeTV!	Season 1, 2007–08: Patricia and Sane	Rony Curvelo	R$500,000
Canada	The Amazing Race Canada	CTV	Season 1, 2013: Tim Hague, Sr. and Tim Hague, Jr.; Season 2, 2014: Mickey Henry and Pete Schmalz; Season 3, 2015: Gino and Jesse Montani; Season 4, 2016: Steph LeClair and Kristen McKenzie; Season 5, 2017: Sam Lambert and Paul Mitskopoulos; Season 6 (Heroes Edition), 2018: Courtney Berglind and Adam Kovacs; Season 7, 2019: Anthony Johnson and James Makokis; Season 8, 2022: Catherine Wreford and Craig Ramsay; Season 9, 2023: Ty Smith and Kat Kastner; Season 10, 2024: Taylor McPherson and Katie Mulkay; Season 11, 2025: Jesse Harink and Jonathon Braun; Season 12, 2026: Tina and Liz Liao; Season 13, 2027: Upcoming season	Jon Montgomery	CA$250,000; trip of two around the world; two Chevrolet vehicles (1-11); "gas for life" from Petro-Canada (2–3)
China	The Amazing Race: China Rush 极速前进：冲刺！中国	ICS; Dragon TV (2–3)	Season 1, 2010: Charlie Gale and Rachel Chen; Season 2, 2011: Lily Li and Jan Höpper; Season 3, 2012: Liu Weiwei and Lei Sheng	Allan Wu	Trip around the World
China	The Amazing Race; China (Season 3–4) 极速前进 (Celebrity Edition)	Shenzhen TV	Season 1, 2014: Zhong Hanliang and Jackie; Season 2, 2015: Han Geng and Wu Xin; Season 3, 2016: Guo Jingjing and Huo Qigang; Season 4, 2017: Jia Jingwen and Xiu Jiekai	Andy On (1); Allan Wu (1–4)	Two trophies; Two Infiniti Q50 (1–2); Money to donate; Pearl Necklace (3)
Finland	Amazing Race Suomi; The Amazing Race Finland (Celebrity Edition)	Nelonen	Season 1, 2023: Kaisa Mäkäräinen and Mari Eder; Season 2, 2024: Metti Forssell and Hanna Launonen; Season 3, 2025–26: Maria Guzenina and Vilma Vähämaa; Season 4, 2026–27: Upcoming season	Heikki Paasonen	€30,000
France	Amazing Race : la plus grande course autour du monde ! Amazing Race: the biggest race around the world!	D8	Season 1, 2012: Anthony Martinage and Sonja Sacha	Alexandre Delpérier	€50,000
Israel	המירוץ למיליון; HaMerotz LaMillion; The Race to the Million	Channel 2 (Reshet) (1–5); Channel 13 (6–8); Channel 12 (9–)	Season 1, 2009: Guy Osadon and Shay Kahana; Season 2, 2011–12: Bar Ben-Vakil and Inna Broder; Season 3, 2013: Talia Gorodess and Koby Windzberg; Season 4, 2014–15: Shay Gavriel and Shani Alon; Season 5, 2016: Amit and Raz Gal; Season 6, 2017–18: Evelin and Tohar Haimovich; Season 7, 2019: Tia Galili and Fay Jakite; Season 8 (All Stars), 2020: Yael Carmon and Yosiel Neeman; Season 9, 2024: Lee and Anne Avrahami; Season 10, 2026: Tom Shelach and Almog Ohayon; Season 11, TBA: Upcoming Season	Raz Meirman (1); Ron Shahar (2–8); Yehuda Levi (9–)	NIS 1,000,000
Latin America	The Amazing Race en Discovery Channel; The Amazing Race on Discovery Channel	Discovery Channel Latin America	Season 1, 2009: Matías Franchini and Tamara Reichelt; Season 2, 2010: Mauricio and Carlos Coarasa	Harris Whitbeck (1–3); Paulo Zulu (4); Toya Montoya (5–6); Jaime Arellano (6)	US$250,000 (1–5) US$100,000 (6)
Latin America	The Amazing Race	Space; TC Televisión (6)	Season 3, 2011: Cristóbal and Nicolás Brain; Season 4 (Edição Brasil), 2012: Daniel Belém and César Curti; Season 5, 2013: Ezequiel Sapochnik and Tobías de la Barra; Season 6 (Ecuador), 2014: Juan Carlos Estrada and Giovanni López	Harris Whitbeck (1–3); Paulo Zulu (4); Toya Montoya (5–6); Jaime Arellano (6)	US$250,000 (1–5) US$100,000 (6)
Norway	The Amazing Race Norge; The Amazing Race Norway	TV 2	Season 1, 2012: Morten and Truls Bjerke; Season 2, 2013: Omar and Bilal Ishqair	Freddy dos Santos	500,000 kr and two cars; Subaru XV (1); Subaru Forester (2)
Philippines	The Amazing Race Philippines	TV5	Season 1, 2012: LJ Moreno and CJ Jaravata; Season 2, 2014: Matt Edwards and Phoebe Walker	Derek Ramsay	₱2,000,000 (1); ₱2,000,000 + 2 Kia Sportage + 2 House and Lot Properties (2)
Ukraine	Великі Перегони; Velyki Perehony; Great Race	1+1	Season 1, 2013: Valeria Nikiforets and Bohdana Primak	Oleksandr "Fozzy" Sydorenko	₴500,000
United States	The Amazing Race (Flagship/Original Edition)	CBS	Season 1, 2001: Rob Frisbee and Brennan Swain; Season 2, Spring 2002: Chris Luca and Alex Boylan; Season 3, Fall 2002: Flo Pesenti and Zach Behr; Season 4, 2003: Reichen Lehmkuhl and Chip Arndt; Season 5, 2004: Chip and Kim McAllister; Season 6, 2004–05: Freddy Holliday and Kendra Bentley; Season 7, Spring 2005: Uchenna and Joyce Agu; Season 8 (Family Edition), Fall 2005: Nick, Alex, Megan and Tommy Linz; Season 9, Spring 2006: B. J. Averell and Tyler MacNiven; Season 10, Fall 2006: Tyler Denk and James Branaman; Season 11 (All-Stars), 2007: Eric Sanchez and Danielle Turner; Season 12, 2007–08: TK Erwin and Rachel Rosales; Season 13, 2008: Nick and Starr Spangler; Season 14, Spring 2009: Tammy and Victor Jih; Season 15, Fall 2009: Meghan Rickey and Cheyne Whitney; Season 16, Spring 2010: Dan and Jordan Pious; Season 17, Fall 2010: Nat Strand and Kat Chang; Season 18 (Unfinished Business), Spring 2011: Kisha and Jen Hoffman; Season 19, Fall 2011: Ernie Halvorsen and Cindy Chiang; Season 20, Spring 2012: Rachel and Dave Brown, Jr.; Season 21, Fall 2012: Josh Kilmer-Purcell and Brent Ridge; Season 22, Spring 2013: Bates and Anthony Battaglia; Season 23, Fall 2013: Jason Case and Amy Diaz; Season 24 (All-Stars), Spring 2014: Dave and Connor O'Leary; Season 25, Fall 2014: Amy DeJong and Maya Warren; Season 26, Spring 2015: Laura Pierson and Tyler Adams; Season 27, Fall 2015: Kelsey Gerckens and Joey Buttitta; Season 28, 2016: Dana Alexa Borriello and Matt Steffanina; Season 29, 2017: Brooke Camhi and Scott Flanary; Season 30, 2018: Cody Nickson and Jessica Graf; Season 31 (Reality Showdown), 2019: Colin Guinn and Christie Woods; Season 32, 2020: Will Jardell and James Wallington; Season 33, Winter 2022: Kim and Penn Holderness; Season 34, Fall 2022: Derek Xiao and Claire Rehfuss; Season 35, 2023: Greg and John Franklin; Season 36, 2024: Ricky Rotandi and Cesar Aldrete; Season 37 (Season of Surprises), Spring 2025: Carson McCalley and Jack Dodge; Season 38 (European Adventure), Fall 2025: Jas and Jag Bains; Season 39, 2026: Upcoming season	Phil Keoghan	US$1,000,000 (Note: Season 21 featured the Double Your Money prize for the winners of the first leg, enabling them to win a US$2 million grand prize should they win the race.)
Vietnam	Cuộc đua kỳ thú The Amazing Race Vietnam	VTV3 (1–2, 4, 6); VTV6 (3, 5); VTV9 (5)	Season 1, 2012: Saetti Baggio and Thành Phúc; Season 2 (Celebrity Edition), 2013: Trần Thị Thu Hiền and Diệp Lâm Anh; Season 3 (Celebrity Edition), 2014: Hương Giang and Criss Lai; Season 4 (Celebrities vs. Fans), 2015: Trần Ngọc Anh and Đỗ Nhật Anh; Season 5 (All-Stars), 2016: Đinh Tiến Đạt and Lincoln Thúc Lĩnh; Season 6 (Celebrity Edition), 2019: Đặng Thị Lệ Hằng and H'Hen Niê	Dustin Nguyen (1); Huy Khánh (2–3, 5); Phan Anh (4); Song Luân (6); Hương Giang (6)	300,000,000₫

NOTE: There was a planned Central European version, which was announced that it was to air in 2006 on AXN Central Europe. It was canceled and is therefore not included in the list.

== The Apprentice ==
- Original name: The Apprentice
- Origin: U.S.
- Date started: January 8, 2004
- Creator: Mark Burnett
- First network to broadcast: NBC
- First country to adapt: Brazil
- Currently airing
- An upcoming airing
- Status unknown
- No longer airing

Area	Name	Host	Channel	Catchphrase	Winners
Global	The Apprentice: ONE Championship Edition	Chatri Sityodtong	AXN Asia	You're not the "ONE"!	S1, 2021: Jessica Ramella
African Union	The Apprentice Africa	Biodun Shobanjo	NTA; TV3; KTN; WBS; TBC1		S1, 2008: Isaac Dankyi-Koranteng
Asia	The Apprentice Asia	Tony Fernandes	Asia	You're fired!	S1, 2013: Jonathan Allen Yabut
Arab World	الإدارة جدارة; Al Idara Jadara	Mohamed Ali Alabbar	LBC		S1, 2005: Cancelled
Australia	The Apprentice Australia	Mark Bouris (2009-2015); Alan Sugar (2021-2022)	Nine	You're fired!	S1, 2009: Andrew Morello
Australia	The Celebrity Apprentice Australia	Mark Bouris (2009-2015); Alan Sugar (2021-2022)	Nine	You're fired!	S1, 2011: Julia Morris; S2, 2012: Ian "Dicko" Dickson; S3, 2013: Stephanie Rice; S4, 2015: Sophie Monk; S5, 2021: Shaynna Blaze; S6, 2022: Benji Marshall
Belgium	De Topmanager	Rob Heyvaert	VT4		S1, 2006: Claudia Schiepers
Brazil	O Aprendiz	Roberto Justus	Record TV	Você está demitido!	S1, 2004: Vivianne Ventura; S2, 2005: Fabio Porcel; S3, 2006: Anselmo Martini; S4, 2007: Tiago Aguiar; S5, 2008: Clodoaldo Araujo; S6, 2009: Marina Erthal; S9, 2013: Renata Tolentino
Brazil	O Aprendiz	João Doria Jr.	Record TV	Você está demitido!	S7, 2010: Samara Schuch; S8, 2011: Janaina Melo
Brazil	Aprendiz Celebridades	Roberto Justus	Record TV	Você está demitido!	S10, 2014: Ana Moser
Brazil	O Aprendiz	Roberto Justus	Band	Você está demitido!	S11, 2019: Gabriel Gasparini
Bulgaria	Звездни стажанти Zvezdni stajanti	Stefan Sharlopov	Nova TV	Ти си уволнен! Ti si uvolnen!	S1, 2016: 100 Kila
Colombia	El Aprendiz	Jean-Claude Bessudo	Canal Caracol	¡Estás despedido!	S1, 2006: Kees Stapel
Czech Republic and Slovakia	Šéfka	Nora Mojsejová	TV Prima; TV JOJ	U mňa si dnes skončil!	S1, 2011: Michal Pilip
Denmark	Hyret Eller Fyret	Klaus Riskaer Pedersen	Kanal 5	Du er fyret	S1, 2005: Louise Holm
Estonia	Mantlipärija	Armin Karu	TV3		S1, 2007: Sverre Puustusmaa
Finland	Diili	Jari Sarasvuo	MTV3	Olet vapautettu	S1, 2005: Olli Rikala
Finland	Diili	Hjallis Harkimo	MTV3	Sä saat potkut!	S2, 2009: Antti Seppinen; S3, 2010: Mira Kasslin; S4, 2011: Jarno Purtsi; S5, 2013: Maria Drockila; S6, 2018: Olli-Pekka Villa
France	The Apprentice : Qui décrochera le job ?	Bruno Bonnell	M6	Vous n'êtes pas prêt !	S1, 2015: Séverine Verdot
Germany	Big Boss	Reiner Calmund	RTL	Sie haben frei	S1, 2004: Carmen Dohmen
Georgia	კანდიდატი Kandidati	Lado Gurgenidze	Rustavi 2		S1, 2004: Luka Lomaia
Georgia	შეგირდი Shegidi	Kakha Bendukidze	Imedi		S1, 2011: ?
Greece	Ο Υποψήφιος	Petros Kostopoulos	Alpha TV		S1, 2004: Thanos Marinis
Hungary	Az álommeló	Levente Balogh	RTL		S1, 2023: Balázs Keserű; S2, 2024: Eszter Kása
Indonesia	The Apprentice Indonesia	Peter F. Gontha	Indosiar (2005)	Anda saya pecat	S1, 2005: Fendi Gunawan Liem; S2, 2009: Charles Minin; S3, 2010: Nurudin Bin Syarif; S4, 2011: Oki Musakti
Indonesia	The Apprentice Indonesia	TBA	RCTI	Anda saya pecat	S1, 2005: Fendi Gunawan Liem; S2, 2009: Charles Minin; S3, 2010: Nurudin Bin Syarif; S4, 2011: Oki Musakti
Ireland	The Apprentice	Bill Cullen	TV3	You are fired!	S1, 2008: Brenda Shanahan; S2, 2009: Steve Rayner; S3, 2010: Michelle Massey; S4, 2011: Eugene Heary
Ireland	Celebrity Apprentice Ireland	Caroline Downey	TV3	You are fired!	S1, 2013: Edele Lynch
Italy	The Apprentice	Flavio Briatore	Cielo; Sky Uno	Sei fuori!	S1, 2012: Francesco Menegazzo; S2, 2014: Alice Maffezzoli
Mongolia	Аппрентис Монгол; Apprentice Mongolia	Ganhuyag Chuluun Hutagt	Mongol TV		S1, 2020: Ts. Barkhas
The Netherlands	De Nieuwe Moszkowicz	Bram Moszkowicz	AVRO		S1, 2005: Nienke Hoogervorst
The Netherlands	Topmanager Gezocht	Bram Moszkowicz	BNN	Met jou ga ik niet ondernemen!	S1, 2011: Rogier Berlips
The Netherlands	Celebrity Apprentice	Michel Perridon	Videoland		S1, 2022: Bizzey
New Zealand	The Apprentice New Zealand	Terry Serepisos	TV2		S1, 2010: Thomas Ben
New Zealand	The Apprentice Aotearoa	Mike Pero	TVNZ 1	You're fired!	S1, 2021: Vanessa Goodson
Norway	Kandidaten	Inger Ellen Nicolaisen	TVNORGE	Du har sparken	S1, 2005: Jeanette Bretteville
Portugal	Temos Negócio	Leonor Poeiras	TVI		S1, 2015–16: Luís & Rodrigo
Russia	Кандидат; Kandidat	Arkady Novikov	TNT	Вы уволены	S1, 2005: Tatyana Burdelova
Russia	Кандидат; Kandidat	Vladimir Potanin	TNT	Вы уволены	S2, 2006: ??; S3, 2007: ??
South Africa	The Apprentice: SA	Tokyo Sexwale	SABC3	You're dismissed!	S1, 2009: Zanele Batyashe & Khomotso Choma
South Africa	The Apprentice: SA	Magda Wierzycka			
Spain	El Aprendiz	Lluís Bassat	LaSexta	Estás despedido	S1, 2009: Juan Ignacio Lanchares
Sweden	The Apprentice Sverige	Gunilla von Platen	TV4		S1, 2022: Tom Flumés
Switzerland	Traum Job	Jürg Marquar	SF1	Sie sind raus	S1, 2005: Martin Bachofner
Turkey	Çırak	Tuncay Özilhan	Kanal D	Seninle çalışmak istemiyorum!	S1, 2005: Ahmet Isik
United Kingdom	The Apprentice	Alan Sugar	BBC Two (2005–06); BBC One (2007–present)	You're fired!	S1, 2005: Tim Campbell; S2, 2006: Michelle Dewberry; S3, 2007: Simon Ambrose; S4, 2008: Lee McQueen; S5, 2009: Yasmina Siadatan; Junior Apprentice, 2010: Arjun Rajyagor; S6, 2010: Stella English; S7, 2011: Tom Pellereau; Young Apprentice, 2011: Zara Brownless; S8, 2012: Ricky Martin; Young Apprentice, 2012: Ashleigh Porter-Exley; S9, 2013: Dr. Leah Totton; S10, 2014: Mark Wright; S11, 2015: Joseph Valente; S12, 2016: Alana Spencer; S13, 2017: Sarah Lynn and James White; S14, 2018: Sian Gabbidon; S15, 2019: Carina Lepore; S16, 2022: Harpreet Kaur; S17, 2023: Marnie Swindells; S18, 2024: Rachel Woolford; S19, 2025: Dean Franklin; S20, 2026: Karishma Vijay
United States	The Apprentice	Donald Trump	NBC	You're fired!	S1, 2004: Bill Rancic; S2, 2004: Kelly Perdew; S3, 2005: Kendra Todd; S4, 2005: Randal Pinkett; S5, 2006: Sean Yazbeck; S6, 2007: Stefanie Schaeffer; S10, 2010: Brandy Kuentzel
United States	The Apprentice: Martha Stewart	Martha Stewart	NBC	You just don't fit in!	S1, 2005: Dawna Stone
United States	The Celebrity Apprentice	Donald Trump	NBC	You're fired!	S7, 2008: Piers Morgan; S8, 2009: Joan Rivers; S9, 2010: Bret Michaels; S11, 2011: John Rich; S12, 2012: Arsenio Hall; S13, 2013: Trace Adkins; S14, 2015: Leeza Gibbons
United States	The New Celebrity Apprentice	Arnold Schwarzenegger	NBC	You're terminated!	S15, 2017: Matt Iseman
Vietnam	Ước mơ của tôi	Phạm Thu Nga	VTV3		S1, 2007: ?

== Bachelor Nation ==
Original name: The Bachelor
Origin: United States
Date started: March 25, 2002
Creator: Mike Fleiss
First network to broadcast: ABC
First country to adapt: United Kingdom

Currently airing franchise
Franchise with an upcoming season
Franchise no longer aired
Status unknown

Country	Name	Host	Network	Bachelor(s) and Winner(s)	Date premiered
Africa	The Bachelor Afrique	Emma Lohoues	Canal+ Afrique		October 15, 2022
Albania	Love Story	Alketa Vejsiu	TV Klan		November 16, 2020
Australia	The Bachelor Australia	Osher Günsberg	Network Ten	Season 1, 2013: Tim Robards, Anna Heinrich; Season 2, 2014: Blake Garvey, Sam Frost; Season 3, 2015: Sam Wood, Snezana Markoski; Season 4, 2016: Richie Strahan, Alex Nation; Season 5, 2017: Matty Johnson, Laura Byrne; Season 6, 2018: Nick Cummins, no winner; Season 7, 2019: Matt Agnew, Chelsie McLeod; Season 8, 2020: Locky Gilbert, Irena Srbinovska; Season 9, 2021: Jimmy Nicholson, Holly Kingston; Season 10, Summer 2023: Felix Van Hofe, Jessica Navin; Jed McIntosh, Alésia Delaney; and Thomas Malucelli, Leah Cummings; Season 11, Spring 2023: Ben Waddell, McKenna Lea; Luke Bateman, Ellie Rolfe; and Wesley Cortes, Brea Marshall	September 8, 2013
Belgium (Flanders)	De Bachelor	Goedele Liekens	Play4		February 9, 2022
Bosnia and Herzegovina	Gospodin Savršeni	Marko Vargek	Voyo		January 26, 2026
Brazil	The Bachelor	Fábio Arruda	RedeTV!	Season 1, 2014: Gianluca Perino, Aane Doux	November 21, 2014
Bulgaria	Ергенът; The Bachelor	Naum Shopov	bTV	Season 1, 2022: Viktor Stoyanov; Season 2, 2023: Evgeni Genchev; Season 3, 2024: Aleksandar Mladenov; Season 4, 2025: Viktor Rusinov; Martin Nikolov–Elvisa; Vasil Penev; Season 5, 2026: Kristian Genchev; Marin Stanev; Stoyan Dimov; Georgi Gatev	February 19, 2022
Canada	The Bachelor Canada	Tyler Harcott	City	Season 1, 2012: Brad Smith, Bianka Kamber; Season 2, 2014: Tim Warmels, April Brockman; Season 3, 2017: Chris Leroux, Mikaela Wightman	October 3, 2012
China	The Bachelor (黄金单身汉）	Qiu Qiming	Mango TV		October 1, 2016
Croatia	Gospodin Savršeni	Antonija Blaće (1–4); Marko Vargek (5–)	RTL Televizija	Season 1, 2018: Goran Juranec, Hana Rodić; Season 2, 2019: Mijo Matić, Nuša Rojs; Season 3, 2022: Toni Šćulac, Stankica Stojanović; Season 4, 2025: Šime Elez, Vanja Stanojević; and Miloš Mičović, Maida Ribić; Season 5, 2026: Karlo Godez, Anastasia Kaleb; and Petar Rašić, Kaja Casar	November 19, 2018
Czech Republic	Vem si mě – The Bachelor	Mário Kubec	TV Nova	Season 1, 2007: Michal Červín, Krásná Barbara	September 9, 2007
Czech Republic	Bachelor Česko	Zorka Hejdová	TV Nova	Season 1, 2024-25:Jan Solfronk, Sabina Pšádová; Season 2, 2025-26: Míra Dubovický, Sarah Vu; and Martin Dubovický, Pavla Vaníčková	November 12, 2024
Denmark	Bachelor	Petra Nagel	TV2 Play		May 25, 2021
Finland	Suomen unelmien poikamies	Sami Kuronen	Nelonen		February 2008
Finland	Bachelor Suomi		Nelonen		March 14, 2016
Finland	Bachelor Suomi	Mikko Parikka	MTV3		March 1, 2022
France	Bachelor, le gentleman célibataire	Stéphane Rotenberg (2003–2005); Grégory Ascher (2013–2014); Boris Ehrgott (2016)	M6 (2003–05); NT1 (2013–16)		May 7, 2003
Germany	Der Bachelor	Arne Jessen (2003–04); None (2012–)	RTL	Season 1, 2003–04: Marcel Maderitsch, Juliane Zieger; Season 2, 2012: Paul Janke, Anja Polzer; Season 3, 2013: Jan Kralitschka, Alissa Harouat; Season 4, 2014: Christian Tews, Katja Kühne; Season 5, 2015: Oliver Sanne, Liz Kaeber; Season 6, 2016: Leonard Freier, Leonie Pump; Season 7, 2017: Sebastian Pannek, Clea-Lacy Juhn; Season 8, 2018: Daniel Völz, Kristina Yantsen; Season 9, 2019: Andrej Mangold, Jennifer Lange; Season 10, 2020: Sebastian Preuss, no winner; Season 11, 2021: Niko Griesert, Michelle Gwozdz; Season 12, 2022: Dominik Stuckmann, Anna Rossow; Season 13, 2023: David Jackson, Angelika Utzeri; Season 14, 2024: Dennis Gries, Katharina Geretschuchin; and Sebaastian Klaus, Larissa Schulte; Season 15, 2025: Martin Braun, Clara Heinrich; and Felix Stein, Seyma Ak; Season 16, 2026: Sebastian Paul, Nadja; and Tim Reitz, Vivien Grabarits Lorenzo; Season 17, 2027: Upcoming season	November 19, 2003; January 4, 2011
Greece; Cyprus	The Bachelor	George Satsidis	Alpha TV	Season 1, 2020: Panagiotis Vasilakos, Nicoletta Tsompanidou; Season 2, 2021: Alexis Pappas, Athena Vas	September 10, 2020
Hungary	A Nagy Ő	László Szarvas (1–2); András Stohl (3); Ramóna Lékai-Kiss (4–)	TV2		September 9, 2003
India, State of Tamil Nadu	எங்க வீட்டு மாப்பிள்ளை Enga Veetu Mapillai	Sangeetha Krish	Colors Tamil		February 20, 2018
India, State of Kerala	Aryakku Parinayam	Sangeetha Krish	Flowers TV		February 26, 2018
Indonesia (Note: Originally, the Indonesian show, The Bachelor Indonesia was set to air on NET. based on The Bachelor, Warner Bros. Television deals with the format of the show in collaboration with distribution and production in Indonesia through PT Dunia Visitama Produksi, known under the name Fremantle for the Indonesian version. However, this show was canceled for an unknown reason. Finally, the show was confirmed to be aired on HBO Asia.)	The Bachelor Indonesia	Oka Antara	HBO Asia		February 10, 2023
Israel	הרווק; HaRavak	Guy Geyor	Channel 10		December 2009
Italy	The Bachelor – L'uomo dei sogni	Cristina Parodi	Canale 5		June 26, 2003
Japan	バチェラー・ジャパン; The Bachelor Japan	Koji Imada (1–4); Shingo Fujimori (2–4); Rino Sashihara (2–4)	Amazon Prime Video		February 17, 2017
New Zealand	The Bachelor New Zealand	Mike Puru	TV3	Season 1, 2015: Art Green, Matilda Rice; Season 2, 2016: Jordan Mauger, Fleur Verhoeven; Season 3, 2017: Zac Franich, Viarni Bright; Season 4, 2021: Moses Mackay, Annie Theis	March 17, 2015
Norway	Ungkaren	Christopher Dons	TVNorge		September 1, 2003
Poland	Kawaler do wzięcia	Krzysztof Banaszyk	TVN		October 8, 2003
Romania	Burlacul	Lucian Marinescu (1); Cătălin Botezatu (2–4); Andreea Mantea (5); Răzvan Fodor (6)	Antena 1	Season 1, 2010: Cătălin Botezatu, Violeta Babiluc; Season 2, 2011: Eduard Popescu Strohlen, Ana Maria Savu; Season 3, 2012: Sergiu Barboni, Adelina Boe; Season 4, 2013: Bogdan Vlădău, Daciana Ciochina; Season 5, 2015: Andrei Andrei, no winner; Season 6, 2016: Andy Constantin, Ana Bene	June 8, 2010
Russia	Холостяк; Holostyak	Pyotr Fadeyev (2013–2020); Nikita Dobrynin (2021); Mikhail Belyanin (2021–2022)	TNT	Season 1, 2013: Evgeny Levchenko, Olesya Ermakova; Season 2, 2014: Maxim Chernyavsky, Maria Drigola; Season 3, 2015: Timur Batrutdinov, Darya Kananukha; Season 4, 2016: Alexey Vorobyov, no winner; Season 5, 2017: Ilya Glinnikov, Ekaterina Nikulina; Season 6, 2019: Egor Kreed, Darya Klyukina; Season 7, 2020: Anton Krivorotov, Barbara Pino; Season 8, 2021: Timati, Ekaterina Safarova; Season 9, 2022: Alexander Grankov, Yana Sapeta; and Dimash Adilet, Sonya Solmanidina	March 10, 2013
Serbia	Mladoženja	Katarina Sismanovic	B92/or TV Prva		2026
Slovakia	Nevesta pre milionára	Viliam Rozboril	TV Markíza		April 28, 2006
Slovakia	Ruža pre nevestu	Krištof Králik	TV Markíza	Season 1: Tomáš Tarr, Petrana Galatea Oráčová; Season 2: Radko Urbaniak, Stanislava Lučková; Season 3: Rasťo Zvara, Karolína Michalčíková; Season 4: Adrian Chabada,in progress	March 3, 2023
Slovenia	Sanjski moški	Peter Poles (2021); Nejc Šmit (2022)	POP TV		September 24, 2004
South Africa	The Bachelor SA	Jason Greer	M-Net		February 14, 2019
Sweden	Bachelor – När leken blir allvar	Malin Stenbäck (2015–2022); Amie Bramme Sey (2024–)	TV4		October 6, 2015
Switzerland	Der Bachelor		3 Plus TV		October 30, 2012
Thailand	The Bachelor Thailand ศึกรัก...สละโสด; The Bachelor Thailand (Bachelor...Battle of Love)	Natpawin Kulkanlayadee	ONE		August 27, 2016
Ukraine	Холостяк; Holostyak	Current Hryhoriy Reshetnyk (2–); Former Ivan Gorodetsky (1)	STB	Season 1, 2011: Maksym Chmerkovsky, Oleksandra Shulhina; Season 2, 2012: Francis Alexander Matthew Romanov, Olena Riasnova; Season 3, 2013: Andrii Iskornev, Aniuta Kozyr; Season 4, 2014: Konstiantyn Yevtushenko, Anna Seliukova; Season 5, 2015: Serhii Melnyk, Maryna Kishchuk; Season 6, 2016: Irakli Makatsaria, Olena Lesyk; Season 7, 2017: Dmytro Cherkasov, Lida Nemchenko; Season 8. 2018: Rozhden Anusi, Ivanna Honcharuk; Season 9, 2019: Nikita Dobrynin, Dariia Kvitkova; Season 10, 2020: Maksym Mykhailiuk, Dasha Ulianova; Season 11, 2021: Mykhailo Zalivako, Anna Bohdan; Season 12, 2022–23: Alex Topolskyi, Kateryna Lozovytska; Season 13, 2024: Oleksandr “Teren” Budko, Inna Bielen; Season 14, 2025: Taras Tsymbalyuk, Current season	March 17, 2011
United Kingdom	The Bachelor	Jeremy Milnes (2003–05); Hugo Speer (2011–12); Mark Wright (2019)	BBC Three (2003–05); Channel 5 (2011–12, 2019)	Series 1, 2003: David Donald, no winner; Series 2, 2004: Jamie Williams, Jodi Plumb; Series 3, 2005: Anthony Thomas, Lindsay Mann; Series 4, 2011: Gavin Henson, Carianne Barrow; Series 5, 2012: Spencer Matthews, Khloe Evans; Series 6, 2019: Alex Marks, Alicia Oates	March 30, 2003; August 19, 2011; March 4, 2019
United States (Note: Expatriates are living in the United States were eligible to apply for the American series unless if they establish a permanent residency.) (Canada) (Note: Starting from the 4th season, Canadians were eligible to apply for the American series.)	The Bachelor	Chris Harrison (2002–21); Jesse Palmer (2022–)	ABC	Season 1, Spring 2002: Alex Michel, Amanda Marsh; Season 2, Fall 2002: Aaron Buerge, Helene Estrokowicz; Season 3, Spring 2003: Andrew Firestone, Jennifer Schefft; Season 4, Fall 2003: Bob Guiney, Estella Gardinier; Season 5, Spring 2004: Jesse Palmer, Jessica Bowlin; Season 6, Fall 2004: Byron Velvick, Mary Delgado; Season 7, 2005: Charlie O'Connell, Sarah Brice; Season 8, Winter 2006: Travis Stork, Sarah Stone; Season 9, Fall 2006: Lorenzo Borghese, Jennifer Wilson; Season 10, Spring 2007: Andy Baldwin, Tessa Horst; Season 11, Fall 2007: Brad Womack, no winner; Season 12, 2008: Matt Grant, Shayne Lamas; Season 13, 2009: Jason Mesnick, Melissa Rycroft; Season 14, 2010: Jake Pavelka, Vienna Girardi; Season 15, 2011: Brad Womack, Emily Maynard; Season 16, 2012: Ben Flajnik, Courtney Robertson; Season 17, 2013: Sean Lowe, Catherine Giudici; Season 18, 2014: Juan Pablo Galavis, Nikki Ferrell; Season 19, 2015: Chris Soules, Whitney Bischoff; Season 20, 2016: Ben Higgins, Lauren Bushnell; Season 21, 2017: Nick Viall, Vanessa Grimaldi; Season 22, 2018: Arie Luyendyk Jr., Becca Kufrin; Season 23, 2019: Colton Underwood, Cassie Randolph; Season 24, 2020: Peter Weber, Hannah Ann Sluss; Season 25, 2021: Matt James, Rachael Kirkconnell; Season 26, 2022: Clayton Echard, Susie Evans; Season 27, 2023: Zach Shallcross, Kaitlyn "Kaity" Biggar; Season 28, 2024: Joey Graziadei, Kelsey Anderson; Season 29, 2025: Grant Ellis, Juliana Pasquarosa	March 25, 2002
Vietnam	The Bachelor Vietnam – Anh chàng độc thân	Khôi Trần	HTV7	Season 1, 2018: Nguyễn Quốc Trung, Bùi Thùy Dương	August 14, 2018

== Bake Off ==
Original name: The Great British Bake Off
Origin: UK
Date started: 17 August 2010
First network to broadcast: BBC Two
First country to adapt: France

=== Current ===
Airing or in production Upcoming season

Country	Local title	Host(s)	Judges	Channel	Premiere
Middle East and North Africa	Arab Bake off	Juliana Saada	Pierre Kurdi; Michel Selim; Jamal Al-Ali	Al-Dar 4	11 February 2022
Algeria	Le Meilleur Pâtissier الجزائري (The Algerian Best Pastry Chef)	Mehdi Yades	Mehdi Hadj Mebarek; Lella Louza	Echourouk TV	28 January 2023
Argentina	Bake Off Argentina, El Gran Pastelero (Bake Off Argentina, The Great Baker)	Paula Chaves	Damián Betular (seasons 1-3); Pamela Villar (seasons 1-3); Dolli Irigoyen (season 3); Christophe Krywonis (seasons 1-2)	Telefe	8 April 2018
Argentina	Bake Off Famosos Argentina (Celebrity Bake Off Argentina)	Wanda Nara	Damián Betular; Maru Botana; Christophe Krywonis	Telefe	2024
Australia	The Great Australian Bake Off	Shane Jacobson (2013); Anna Gare (2013); Claire Hooper (2015–2022); Mel Buttle (2015–2022); Natalie Tran (2023–); Cal Wilson (2023–2024); Tom Walker (2025–)	Dan Lepard (2013); Kerry Vincent (2013); Maggie Beer (2015–2022); Matt Moran (2015–2022); Darren Purchese (2023–); Rachel Khoo (2023–)	Nine Network (2013); LifeStyle Food (2015–2016); Lifestyle (2018–)	9 July 2013
Belgium (Flanders)	De MeesterBakker (The Master Baker)	Rani De Coninck	Sofie Dumont; Bernard Proot	vtm	4 April 2012
Belgium (Flanders)	Bake Off Vlaanderen (Bake Off Flanders)	Wim Opbrouck	Regula Ysewijn; Herman Van Dender	VIER	30 August 2017
Brazil	Bake Off Brasil	Ticiana Villas Boas (2015–16, 2020); Carol Fiorentino (2017); Chris Flores (2020); Nadja Haddad (2018–23, 2025); Fabiana Karla (2024)	Carol Fiorentino (2015–16); Fabrizio Fasano Jr. (2015–17); Olivier Anquier (2018–21); Carlos Bertolazzi (2023); Giuseppe Gerundino (2022–23, 2025); Beca Milano (2017–23, 2025); Carole Crema (2024); André Mifano (2024)	SBT; Discovery Home & Health	25 July 2015
Brazil	Bake Off SBT	Ticiana Villas Boas (2015–16, 2020); Carol Fiorentino (2017); Chris Flores (2020); Nadja Haddad (2018–23, 2025); Fabiana Karla (2024)	Carol Fiorentino (2015–16); Fabrizio Fasano Jr. (2015–17); Olivier Anquier (2018–21); Carlos Bertolazzi (2023); Giuseppe Gerundino (2022–23, 2025); Beca Milano (2017–23, 2025); Carole Crema (2024); André Mifano (2024)	SBT; Discovery Home & Health	23 December 2017
Brazil	Júnior Bake Off Brasil	Ticiana Villas Boas (2015–16, 2020); Carol Fiorentino (2017); Chris Flores (2020); Nadja Haddad (2018–23, 2025); Fabiana Karla (2024)	Carol Fiorentino (2015–16); Fabrizio Fasano Jr. (2015–17); Olivier Anquier (2018–21); Carlos Bertolazzi (2023); Giuseppe Gerundino (2022–23, 2025); Beca Milano (2017–23, 2025); Carole Crema (2024); André Mifano (2024)	SBT; Discovery Home & Health	6 January 2018
Brazil	Bake Off Celebridades	Ticiana Villas Boas (2015–16, 2020); Carol Fiorentino (2017); Chris Flores (2020); Nadja Haddad (2018–23, 2025); Fabiana Karla (2024)	Carol Fiorentino (2015–16); Fabrizio Fasano Jr. (2015–17); Olivier Anquier (2018–21); Carlos Bertolazzi (2023); Giuseppe Gerundino (2022–23, 2025); Beca Milano (2017–23, 2025); Carole Crema (2024); André Mifano (2024)	SBT; Discovery Home & Health	20 February 2021
Canada	The Great Canadian Baking Show	Dan Levy (seasons 1–2); Julia Chan (seasons 1–2); Aurora Browne (season 3); Carolyn Taylor (season 3); Ann Pornel (from season 4); Alan Shane Lewis (from season 4)	Bruno Feldeisen (from season 1); Rochelle Adonis (seasons 1–2); Kyla Kennaley (from season 3)	CBC	1 November 2017
Canada (Quebec)	Le meilleur pâtissier du Québec	Marie-Ève Janvier; Joël Legendre	Joël Lahon; Gaël Vidricaire	Vrai	17 January 2022
Chile	Bake Off Chile, El Gran Pastelero (Bake Off Chile, The Great Baker)	Carolina de Moras	Yann Yvin; Gustavo Sáez; Millaray Vallejos	Chilevisión	6 August 2018
Czech Republic	Peče celá země (Whole country bakes)	Tereza Bebarová; Václav Kopta	(Mirka van Gils Slavíková); Michaela Landová; Josef Maršálek	ČT1	4 January 2020
Denmark	Den store bagedyst (The Great Baking Bout)	Neel Rønholt (season 1); Peter Ingemann (season 1–2); Timm Vladimir (from season 3)	Mette Blomsterberg (season 1–6); Jan Friis-Mikkelsen (season 1–6); Katrine Foged Thomsen (fromseason 7); Marcus Grigo (from season 7)	DR1	28 August 2012
Estonia	Eesti parim pagar	Kristjan Rabi (2015); Indrek Vaheoja (2015); Alari Kivisaar	Angeelika Kang; Ants Uustalu	TV3	31 August 2015
Finland	Koko Suomi leipoo (All of Finland bakes)	Anne Kukkohovi	Mika Parviainen; Sami Granroth	MTV3	24 September 2013
France	Le Meilleur Pâtissier (The Best Pastry Chef)	Faustine Bollaert (2012–2017); Julia Vignali (2017–21); Marie Portolano (2021–2023); Laëtitia Milot (from 2024)	Cyril Lignac; Jacqueline Mercorelli	M6; RTL-TVI (Belgium)	26 November 2012
Germany	Das große Backen (The great Bake)	Britt Hagedorn (2013); Meltem Kaptan (2013); Enie van de Meiklokjes (2014–16, from 2018); Annika Lau (2017)	Christian Hümbs; Enie van de Meiklokjes (2013); Andrea Schirmaier-Huber (2013–14); Betty Schliephake-Burchardt (from 2015)	Sat.1	1 December 2013
Hungary	Ide süss! (Az ország nagy cukrászversenye)	Hajós András; Sass Dániel	Baracskay Angéla; Szabadfi Szabolcs	Viasat 3	26 March 2018
Italy	Bake Off Italia - Dolci in forno (Bake Off Italy – Sweets in the oven)	Benedetta Parodi (2013-2024) Brenda Lodigiani (2025-present)	Ernst Knam (2013-present); Clelia d'Onofrio (2013-2021); Damiano Carrara (2017-present) Tommaso Foglia (2022-present)	Real Time	November 2013
Kenya	The Great Kenyan Bake Off	June Gachui; Nick Ndeda	Kiran Jethwa; Myra Kivuvani Ndungu	KTN Home	7 October 2019
Japan	ベイクオフ・ジャパン (Bake Off Japan)	Maki Sakai; Asuka Kudo	Toshihiko Yoroizuka; Yoshimi Ishikawa	Amazon Prime Video	22 April 2022
Morocco	Pâtissier أحسن (The Best Pastry Chef)	Fadwa Hirate	Othmane Belefkih; Bouchra Tamimi	2M	26 January 2021
Netherlands	Heel Holland Bakt (All of Holland bakes)	Martine Bijl (2013–2015); André van Duin (2016–present)	Robèrt van Beckhoven; Janny van der Heijden	MAX (NPO 1)	5 June 2013
New Zealand	The Great Kiwi Bake Off	Madeleine Sami; Hayley Sproull	Dean Brettschneider; Sue Fleischl	TVNZ 2 (2018–2019); TVNZ 1 (2021)	16 October 2018
Norway	Hele Norge baker (All of Norway Bakes)	Line Verndal	Pascal Dupuy; Øyvind Lofthus	TV3	10 March 2013
Slovakia	Pečie celé Slovensko (All of Slovakia Bakes)	Juraj Bača; Milan "Junior" Zimnýkoval	Petra Tóthová; Jozefína Zaukolcová	RTVS	10 October 2021
South Africa	The Great South African Bake Off	Anne Hirsch; Donovan Goliath (series 1); Lentswe Bhengu (series 2–3); Lesego Tlhabi (series 4); Glen Biderman-Pam (series 4)	Shirley Guy; Tjaart Walraven; Siba Mtongana (series 4); Paul Hartmann (series 4)	BBC Lifestyle	9 August 2023
Spain	Bake Off: Famosos al horno (Bake Off: Celebrities to the oven)	Paula Vázquez	Paco Roncero; Eva Arguiñano; Damián Betular	La 1	11 January 2024
Sweden	Hela Sverige bakar (All of Sweden Bakes)	Tilde de Paula	Johan Sörberg; Birgitta Rasmussen	TV4 (Sjuan)	20 September 2012
Sweden	Hela kändis-Sverige bakar (Celebrity All of Sweden Bakes)	Tilde de Paula	Johan Sörberg; Birgitta Rasmussen	TV4 (Sjuan)	11 November 2014
Thailand	The Great Thai Bake Off (ยอดนักอบขนม)	TBA	TBA	PPTV HD 36	June 2019
Uruguay	Bake Off Uruguay	Jimena Sabaris (2022–present); Annasofía Facello (2021)	Sofía Muñoz (2021–present); Hugo Soca (2022–present); Rose Galfione (2022–present); Stephanie Rauhut (2021); Jean Paul Bondoux (2021)	Canal 4	26 August 2021
Uruguay	Bake Off Famosos Uruguay (Celebrity Bake Off Uruguay)	Jimena Sabaris	Hugo Soca; Leticia Copiz	Canal 4	3 September 2025

=== Former ===
No longer airing

Country	Local title	Host(s)	Judges	Channel	Premiere
Bulgaria	Bake Off: Най-сладкото състезание (Bake Off: The Sweetest Competition)	Aleksandra Raeva; Raffi Bohosyan	Julia Pandzherova; Yuri Baltaliyski	Nova TV	15 November 2016
Greece	Bake Off Greece	Ioanna Triantafyllidou	Nikolas Straggas; Akis Petretzikis; Dimitris Xronopoulos	Alpha TV	23 September 2018
Ireland	The Great Irish Bake Off	Anna Nolan	Biddy White Lennon; Paul Kelly	TV3	19 September 2013
Poland	Polski turniej wypieków [Polish baking contest]	Piotr Gąsowski (1–2); Marta Grycan (1); Katarzyna Skrzynecka (2)	Bożena Sikoń (1–2); Tomasz Deker (1–2)	TLC [Polish]	10 October 2012
Poland	Bake Off – Ale ciacho! [Bake Off – what a cupcake!]	Paulina Mikuła (1); Anna Gacek (1); Marcelina Zawadzka (2–5); Dorota Czaja (2); Katarzyna Kołeczek (3–4); Ida Nowakowska (5)	Krzysztof Ilnicki (1–5); Małgorzata Molska (1–2); Michał Bryś (3–5)	TVP2	5 September 2016
Poland	Bake Off Junior [Junior Bake Off]	Marcelina Zawadzka (1); Ida Nowakowska (1)	Krzysztof Ilnicki (1); Michał Bryś (1)	TVP2	6 September 2018
Romania	Bake Off România(Bake Off Romania)	Nicolle Stanese	Tudor Constantinescu; Simona Pope; Alex Stan	Pro TV	29 February 2016 (1 season)
Spain	Bake Off España (Bake Off Spain)	Jesús Vázquez	Dani Álvarez; Betina Montagne; Miquel Guarro	Cuatro	6 March 2019
Spain	Celebrity Bake Off España (Celebrity Bake Off Spain)	Paula Vázquez; Brays Efe	Clara Villalón; Frédéric Bau	Amazon Prime Video	16 December 2021
Turkey	Ver Fırına	Burcu Esmersoy	Arda Türkmen; Emel Başdoğan	TV8	20 October 2014
Ukraine	Великий Пекарський Турнір (Velykyy Pekarsʹkyy Turnir; Great Bakers Tournament)	Yuri Nikolaevich Gorbunov	Serge Markovic; Catherine Ahronik; Olga Ganushchak	1+1	1 September 2013
United States	The American Baking Competition	Jeff Foxworthy	Marcela Valladolid; Paul Hollywood	CBS	29 May 2013
United States	The Great American Baking Show	Nia Vardalos (seasons 1–2); Ian Gomez (seasons 1–2); Ayesha Curry (season 3); Anthony Adams (seasons 3–4); Emma Bunton (season 4)	Johnny Iuzzini (seasons 1–3); Mary Berry (seasons 1–2); Paul Hollywood (season 3–4); Sherry Yard (season 4)	ABC	30 November 2015 (as The Great Holiday Baking Show)

== The Bar ==
Original name: Baren
Origin: Sweden
Date started: April 2000
Creator: Strix Television
First network to broadcast: TV3
First country to adapt: Norway

Region	Local name	Channel	Winner	Main Presenters
Argentina	El Bar TV	América 2	Season 1, 2001: Federico Blanco; Season 2, 2001: Diego Plotino	Andy Kusnetzoff
Cambodia	CTN Coffee Shop	CTN	Season 1, 2006: Lida Siv	
Croatia	Bar	Nova TV	Season 1, 2005: Damir Milanović	Marin Ivanović "Stoka"
Czech Republic	Bar	TV Prima	Season 1, 2006: Marcela Baldas	Libor Bouček; Laďka Něrgešová
Denmark	Baren	TV3	Season 1, 2001: Erkan Kilic; Season 2, 2002: Noel Johansen	Mikkel Beha Erichsen
Estonia	Baar	Kanal 2	Season 1, 2004: Annika Kiidron; Season 2, 2005: Alari Arnover	
Finland	Baari	SubTV	Season 1, 2006: Frank Tammin	Kirsi Salo; Silvia Modig
Georgia	GeoBar	Rustavi 2	Season 1, 2005: Beso Sarjveladze; Season 2, 2006: Dato Geladze "Chele"; Season 3, 2006: Irakli Markhulia; Season 4, 2007: Dea Anna Adamia	Nino Khoshtaria (Season 1–4)
Greece	Bar (Season 1); Party (Season 2)	Mega TV	Season 1, 2002: Andreas Paraskakis; Season 2, 2003: Maria Tsolaki "Lara"	Miltos Makridis (1); Katerina Laspa (2)
Hungary	Bár	Viasat 3	Season 1, 2001: Tiger; Season 2, 2008: Dániel Izer Zoltán "Duda"	Péter Novák (1); Péter Majoros, Lia Kustánczi (2)
Latvia	Bārs	TV3	Season 1, 2003: Uldis Jēkabsons	Viesturs Buivids
Lithuania	Baras	LNK	Season 1, 2003: Laimis Bartasūnas; Season 2, 2004: Andrius Surblys	Egidijus Knispelis (1); Haroldas Mackevičius (2-3)
Lithuania	Baras 3 (All-Stars & Civilians)	LNK	Season 3, 2005: Skaistė Būtytė	Egidijus Knispelis (1); Haroldas Mackevičius (2-3)
Lithuania	2 Barai	TV3	Season 4, 2016: Julius Mocka; Season 5, 2017: Kristupas Albužis	Vaida Skaisgirė; Justinas Jankevičius
Mexico	El bar provoca	Televisa	Season 1, 2006: José Luis Hernández García ("Piter Punk")	Roberto Palazuelos; Roxana Castellanos
Netherlands	The Bar	Yorin	Season 1, 2002: Camiel Vlasman	Matthias Scholten
Norway	Baren	TV3	Season 1, 2000: Jamila Brodin; Season 2, 2001: Bjørn Sjulstok	Anders Høglund (1–2)
Poland	Bar	Polsat	Season 1, 2002: Adrian Urban; Season 2, 2002: Eric Alira; Season 3, 2003: Maciej Kiślewski	Krzysztof Ibisz (1–6)
Poland	Bar Złoto dla Zuchwałych (Reality All-Stars and civilian versions)	Polsat	Season 4, 2004: Mirka Eichler	Krzysztof Ibisz (1–6)
Poland	Bar Vip (Celebrity & Anonymous Contestants)	Polsat	Season 5, 2004: Ewelina Ciura	Krzysztof Ibisz (1–6)
Poland	Bar Europa (European Contestants)	TV4	Season 6, 2005: Thomas Amos	Krzysztof Ibisz (1–6)
Portugal	O Bar da TV	SIC	Season 1, 2001: Hoji Fortuna	Jorge Gabriel
Serbia	Bar	Kurir TV	Season 1, 2021–22: Davor Darmanović	Jelena Nikolić
Slovenia	Bar	POP TV (1–2); Planet TV (3–4)	Season 1, 2005: Andrej Lavrič; Season 2, 2006: Emil Širić; Season 3, 2015: Črt Banko; Season 4, 2018: Sandi Jug	Sebastjan Kepic (1–3); Jasna Kuljaj (4); Domen Kumer (4)
Sweden	Baren	TV3 (1–5); TV12 (6)	Season 1, 2000: Jocke Ekberg; Season 2, 2001: Dick Lundberg; Season 3, 2002: Tommy Öhver; Season 4, 2003: Mathias Edlund; Season 5, 2004: Daniel Hansen; Season 6, 2015: Ellinor Bjurström	Robert Aschberg (1–5); Paolo Roberto (6)
Switzerland	Die Bar	TV3	Season 1, 2001: Caroline	Yves Schifferle
United Kingdom	Hot Mess Summer	Amazon Prime Video	Season 1, 2023: TBA	Rylan Clark

== Bet on Your Baby ==
Original name: Bet on Your baby
Origin: United States
Date started: April, 13, 2013
Creator: Electus and 5x5 Media
First network to broadcast: ABC
First country to adapt: Turkey

Country	Name	Host	Channel	Premiere	Finale	Prize	Ref.
Argentina	Si los chicos quieren!	Julian Weich	Canal 13	November 1, 2013		$50,000	
China	正大综艺.宝宝来了	Zhu Xun & Qiang Zi	CCTV-1	November 10, 2013		1-year admission to an international kindergarten	
Colombia	¡Apuesta a su Chico!	Lady Mina	Caracol TV	June 2015		$200,000	
Mexico	Le apuesto a mi Bebé	Cecilia Gabriela	Canal de las Estrellas	2014		MX$5,000,000	
Philippines	Bet on Your Baby	Judy Ann Santos	ABS-CBN	October 19, 2013	September 9, 2017	₱1,000,000	
South Korea	COME ON BABY	Noh Hong-chul, Park Ji-yoon	tvN	July 14, 2014		₩5,000,000	
Turkey	Çocuk Oyuncağı	Ezgi Mola	Star TV	July 10, 2013		₺50.000	
Ukraine	Мій малюк зможе Miy Malyuk Zmozhe	Irma Vitovska	1+1	June 15, 2014		₴50.000	
USA (Spanish)	Si Los Bebes Quieren	Maria Eugenia Payan	Univision	November 1, 2019		$50,000	
Uruguay	Bet On Your Baby Uruguay!	Lady Mina Cecilia Gabriella Judy Ann Santos	Telefe	March 7, 2013	December 25, 2015	$1,000,000	
Vietnam	Cố lên con yêu!	Ốc Thanh Vân, Trần Tiểu Hào	VTV3	April 17, 2016	April 14, 2018	đ 30.000.000	

== Big Brother Inspired by Nineteen Eighty-Four by George Orwell ==
Original name: Big Brother
Origin: Netherlands
Date started: September 16, 1999
Creator: John de Mol
First network to broadcast: Veronica
First country to adapt: Germany
Country with the most seasons: United States of America

Currently airing
An upcoming season
Status unknown
No longer airing

Country/Region	Official name	Network(s)	Winner(s)	Presenter(s)
Africa (English-language: Angola, Botswana, Ethiopia, Ghana, Kenya, Liberia, Malawi, Mozambique, Namibia, Nigeria, Rwanda, South Africa, Sierra Leone, Tanzania, Uganda, Zimbabwe and Zambia)	Big Brother Africa	M-Net; Africa Magic; Mzansi Magic; DStv (live)	Season 1, 2003: Cherise Makubale; Season 2, 2007: Richard Dyle Bezuidenhout; Season 3, 2008: Ricardo Venancio; Season 4, 2009: Kevin Chuwang; Season 5, 2010: Uti Nwachukwu; Season 6, 2011: Karen Igho & Wendall Parsons; Season 7, 2012: Keagan Petersen; Season 8, 2013: Dillish Matthews; Season 9, 2014: Idris Sultan	Mark Pilgrim (1); Kabelo Ngakane (2–3); IK Osakioduwa (4–9)
Africa (French-language: Benin, Burkina Faso, Cameroon, Congo, DR Congo, Côte d'Ivoire, Gabon, Guinea, Madagascar, Mali, Niger, Senegal, Togo)	Secret Story Afrique	Canal+ Afrique	Season 1, 2024: Awa Sanoko; Season 2, 2025: Moctar Privé; Season 3, 2026: Upcoming season	Jean-Michel Onnin; Stéphanelle
Albania	Big Brother Albania	Top Channel; DigitAlb (live)	Season 1, 2008: Arbër Çepani; Season 2, 2009: Qetsor Ferunaj; Season 3, 2010: Jetmir Salaj; Season 4, 2010–11: Ermela Mezuraj; Season 5, 2012: Arbër Zeka; Season 6, 2013: Anaidi Kaloti; Season 7, 2014: Nevila Omeri; Season 8, 2015: Vesel Kurtishaj; Season 9, 2017: Danjel Dedndreaj & Fotini Derxho	Arbana Osmani (1–7, 9); Ledion Liço (8)
Albania	Big Brother VIP	Top Channel; DigitAlb (live)	Season 1, 2021–22: Ilir Shaqiri; Season 2, 2022–23: Luiz Ejlli; Season 3, 2024: Egla Ceno; Season 4, 2024–25: Besart "Gjesti" Kelmendi; Season 5, 2025–26: Selin Bollati; Season 6, 2026–27: Upcoming season	Current; Ledion Liço (3–); Former; Arbana Osmani (1–2)
Angola; Mozambique	Big Brother Angola (1–2); Big Brother Angola e Moçambique (3)	Jango Magic; DStv	Season 1, 2014: Larama da Silva; Season 2, 2015: Luna Vambano & Mr. Norway Vunge; Season 3, 2016: Anderson Mistake & Papetchulo	Dicla Burity (1–3); Emerson Miranda (3)
Arab world (Bahrain, Egypt, Iraq, Jordan, Kuwait, Lebanon, Oman, Saudi Arabia, Somalia, Syria and Tunisia)	Big Brother: الرئيس; Big Brother: The Boss	MBC 2	Season 1, 2004: Discontinued	Razan Moughrabi
Argentina	Gran Hermano	Telefe; DirecTV (live; 1–3, 6–7, 11–); Cablevisión (live; 4–5); Multicanal (live; 4); TDT (live; 6–7); Pluto TV (live; 10)	Season 1, 2001: Marcelo Corazza; Season 2, 2001: Roberto Parra; Season 3, 2002–03: Viviana Colmenero; Season 4, 2007: Marianela Mirra; Season 5, 2007: Esteban Morais; Season 6, 2010–11: Cristian Urrizaga; Season 7, 2011–12: Rodrigo Fernández; Season 10, 2022–23: Marcos Ginocchio; Season 11, 2023–24: Bautista Mascia; Season 12, 2024–25: Santiago Algorta; Season 13, 2026: Solange Gómez; Season 14, 2027: Upcoming season	Main host: Soledad Silveyra (1–3); Jorge Rial (4–7); Mariano Peluffo (7); Santiago del Moro (10–); Debate: Juan Alberto Badía (1–3); Mariano Peluffo (4–7); Santiago del Moro (10–)
Argentina	Gran Hermano	América TV; DirecTV (live); Cablevisión (live)	Season 8, 2015: Francisco Delgado; Season 9, 2016: Luis Fabián Galesio	Main host: Jorge Rial; Debate: Pamela David
Argentina	Gran Hermano Famosos	Telefe; Cablevisión (live); Multicanal (live)	Season 1, 2007: Diego Leonardi	Main host: Jorge Rial; Debate: Mariano Peluffo
Australia	Big Brother	Network 10; 10 (VoD) (live stream; 16—)	Season 1, 2001: Ben Williams; Season 2, 2002: Peter Corbett; Season 3, 2003: Regina Bird; Season 4, 2004: Trevor Butler; Season 5, 2005: Greg Matthew; Season 6, 2006: Jamie Brooksby; Season 7, 2007: Aleisha Cowcher; Season 8, 2008: Terri Munro; Season 16, 2025: Coco Beeby; Season 17, 2026: Upcoming season	Current; Mel Tracina (16–); Former; Gretel Killeen (1–7); Kyle Sandilands (8); Jackie O (8)
Australia	Big Brother	Nine Network	Season 9, 2012: Benjamin Norris; Season 10, 2013: Tim Dormer; Season 11, 2014: Ryan Ginns	Sonia Kruger
Australia	Big Brother	Seven Network	Season 12, 2020: Chad Hurst; Season 13, 2021: Marley Biyendolo; Season 14, 2022: Reggie Sorensen; Season 15, 2023: Tay & Ari Wilcoxson	Sonia Kruger
Australia	Celebrity Big Brother	Network 10	Season 1, 2002: Dylan Lewis	Gretel Killeen
Australia	Big Brother VIP	Seven Network	Season 1, 2021: Luke Toki	Sonia Kruger
Balkans (Bosnia and Herzegovina, Croatia, Montenegro, North Macedonia and Serbia)	Veliki Brat; Big Brother	Pink BH (1–4); Pink M (1–4); B92 (1–3, 5); A1 (3); Pink (4); RTL (4–5); OBN (5); RTRS (5); Sitel (5); Prva (5)	Season 1, 2006: Ivan Ljuba; Season 2, 2007: Discontinued; Season 3, 2009: Vladimir Arsić „Arsa"; Season 4, 2011: Marijana Čvrljak; Season 5, 2015: Darko "Spejko" Petkovski	Marijana Mićić (1, 3–4); Irina Vukotić (1, 3); Ana Grubin (2); Antonija Blaće (4–5); Sky Wikluh (5)
Balkans (Bosnia and Herzegovina, Croatia, Montenegro, North Macedonia and Serbia)	Veliki Brat VIP; Big Brother VIP	Pink M (1–4); Pink BH (1–4); B92 (1–2, 5); Pink (3–4); A1 (4); BN (5); Prva (5); OBN (5); Sitel (5)	Season 1, 2007: Saša Ćurčić „Đani"; Season 2, 2008: Mirjana „Mimi" Đurović; Season 3, 2009: Miroslav „Miki" Đuričić; Season 4, 2010: Milan Marić „Švaba"; Season 5, 2013: Žarko Stojanović	Ana Grubin (1–2); Irina Vukotić (1); Milan Kalinić (2–3); Marijana Mićić (3–5); Dragan Marinković (4)
Balkans (Bosnia and Herzegovina, Croatia, Montenegro, North Macedonia and Serbia)	Veliki Brat: Generalna Proba; Veliki Brat: General Rehearsal	B92	Season 1, 2006: Jelena Provči & Marko Miljković	Marijana Mićić
Belgium	Big Brother	Kanaal Twee	Season 1, 2000: Steven Spillebeen; Season 2, 2001: Ellen Dufour; Season 3, 2002: Kelly Vandevenne; Season 4, 2003: Kristof van Camp; Season 5, 2006: Kirsten Janssens; Season 6, 2007: Diana Ferrante	Walter Grootaers
Belgium	Big Brother (Netherlands and Belgium)	VIER/Play4; Telenet (live)	Season 1, 2021: Jill Goede; Season 2, 2022: Salar Abassi Abrassi; Season 3, 2023: Bart Vandenbroek; Season 4, 2024: Glenn Van Himst; Season 5, 2025: Jordy de Maar	Current; Geraldine Kemper; Tatyana Beloy (3–); Former; Peter Van de Veire (1–2)
Belgium	Big Brother VIPs	VTM; Kanaal Twee	Season 1, 2001: Sam Gooris; Season 2, 2006: Pim Symoens	No presenters
Belgium	Big Brother All-Stars	Kanaal Twee	Season 1, 2003: Heidi Zutterman	Walter Grootaers
Brazil	Big Brother Brasil	TV Globo; Multishow; Globoplay (live on PPV)	Season 1, 2002: Kleber de Paula; Season 2, 2002: Rodrigo Leonel; Season 3, 2003: Dhomini Ferreira; Season 4, 2004: Cida dos Santos; Season 5, 2005: Jean Wyllys; Season 6, 2006: Mara Viana; Season 7, 2007: Diego Gasques; Season 8, 2008: Rafinha Ribeiro; Season 9, 2009: Maximiliano Porto; Season 10, 2010: Marcelo Dourado; Season 11, 2011: Maria Melillo; Season 12, 2012: Fael Cordeiro; Season 13, 2013: Fernanda Keulla; Season 14, 2014: Vanessa Mesquita; Season 15, 2015: Cézar Lima; Season 16, 2016: Munik Nunes; Season 17, 2017: Emilly Araújo; Season 18, 2018: Gleici Damasceno; Season 19, 2019: Paula von Sperling; Season 20, 2020: Thelma Assis; Season 21, 2021: Juliette Freire; Season 22, 2022: Arthur Aguiar; Season 23, 2023: Amanda Meirelles; Season 24, 2024: Davi Brito; Season 25, 2025: Renata Saldanha; Season 26, 2026: Ana Paula Renault; Season 27, 2027: Upcoming season	Current; Tadeu Schmidt (22–); Former; Marisa Orth (1); Pedro Bial (1–16); Tiago Leifert (17–21)
Bulgaria	Big Brother	Nova Television; Nova+ (live; 1–4); Diema Family (live; 5)	Season 1, 2004–05: Zdravko Vasilev; Season 2, 2005: Miroslav Atanasov; Season 3, 2006: Lyubov Stancheva; Season 4, 2008: Georgi Alurkov; Season 5, 2015: Nikita Jönsson; Season 6, 2024: Mario Todorov; Season 7, 2025: David Bett	Current; Bashar Rahal (6–7); Aleksandra Bogdanska (6–7); Former; Niki Kunchev (1–3, 5); Evelina Pavlova (1–2); Milen Tsvetkov (4); Rumen Lukanov (4); Aleksandra Sarchadjieva (5)
Bulgaria	VIP Brother	Nova Television; Nova+ (live; 1–2); Diema 2 (live; 3); Diema Family (live; 4–6)	Season 1, 2006: Konstantin Slavchev; Season 2, 2007: Hristina Stefanova; Season 3, 2009: Deyan Slavchev – Deo; Season 4, 2012: Orlin Pavlov; Season 5, 2013: Stanka Zlateva; Season 6, 2014: Vladislav Karamfilov – Vladi Vargala; Season 7, 2015: Georgi Tashev – Gino Biancalana; Season 8, 2016: Miglena Angelova; Season 9, 2017: Yonislav Yotov – Toto; Season 10, 2018: Atanas Kolev	Niki Kunchev; Evelina Pavlova (1); Dimitar Rachkov (3); Maria Ignatova (3); Aleksandra Sarchadjieva (4–10); Miglena Angelova (9); Azis (10)
Bulgaria	Big Brother Family	Nova Television; Diema Family (live)	Season 1, 2010: Eli & Veselin Kuzmovi	Niki Kunchev
Bulgaria	Big Brother All Stars (1–4); Big Brother: Most Wanted (5–6)	Nova Television; Diema Family (live; 1–3)	Season 1, 2012: Nikola Nasteski – Lester; Season 2, 2013: Zlatka Dimitrova; Season 3, 2014: Todor Slavkov; Season 4, 2015: Desislava; Season 5, 2017: Georgi Tashev – Gino Biancalana; Season 6, 2018: Stefan Ivanov – Wosh MC	Niki Kunchev; Aleksandra Sarchadjieva; Azis (6)
Canada (English)	Big Brother Canada	Slice	Season 1, 2013: Jillian MacLaughlin; Season 2, 2014: Jon Pardy	Arisa Cox
Canada (English)	Big Brother Canada	Global	Season 3, 2015: Sarah Hanlon; Season 4, 2016: Nicholas & Philippe Paquette; Season 5, 2017: Kevin Martin; Season 6, 2018: Paras Atashnak; Season 7, 2019: Dane Rupert; Season 8, 2020: Discontinued; Season 9, 2021: Tychon Carter-Newman; Season 10, 2022: Kevin Jacobs; Season 11, 2023: Terrell "Ty" McDonald; Season 12, 2024: Bayleigh Pelham	Arisa Cox
Canada (English)	Big Brother Canada	CTV	Season 13, 2027: Upcoming season	Andrea Bain
Canada (French)	Loft Story	TQS	Season 1, 2003: Julie Lemay & Samuel Tissot; Season 2, 2006: Mathieu Baron & Stéphanie Bélanger; Season 3, 2006: Shawn-Edward, Jean-Philippe Anwar & Kim Rusk; Season 4, 2007: Mathieu Surprenant; Season 5, 2008: Charles-Éric Boncoeur	Renée-Claude Brazeau (1); Isabelle Maréchal (2); Marie Plourde (3–5)
Canada (French)	Loft Story: La Revanche; Loft Story: The Revenge	TQS	Season 6, 2009: Sébastien Tremblay	Pierre-Yves Lord
Canada (French)	Big Brother	V	Season 1, 2010: Vincent Durand Dubé	Chéli Sauvé-Castonguay
Canada (French)	Big Brother Célébrités	Noovo	Season 1, 2021: Jean-Thomas Jobin; Season 2, 2022: Stephanie Harvey; Season 3, 2023: Mona de Grenoble; Season 4, 2024: Danick Martineau; Season 5, 2025: Sinem Kara; Season 6, 2026: Gabrielle Côté; Season 7, 2027: Upcoming season	Marie-Mai Bouchard
Chile	Gran Hermano	Chilevisión	Season 1, 2023: Constanza Capelli; Season 2, 2024: Michelle Carvalho; Season 3, 2027: Upcoming season	Diana Bolocco; Emilia Daiber (2); Julio Rodríguez (1)
China	室友一起宅 – Big Brother China; Housemates, Let's Stay Together	Youku.com; Tudou.com	Pilot season, 2015–16: Tan Xiangjun	Zhou Wentao (Live Final); Yang Ruilei (Live Final)
Colombia	Gran Hermano	Caracol Televisión	Season 1, 2003: Mónica Patricia Tejón	Adriana Arango
Colombia	Gran Hermano	Citytv Bogotá	Season 2, 2012: Diana Hernández	Agmeth Escaf
Colombia	La casa de los famosos Colombia; The House of the Famous Colombia	Canal RCN; ViX (live; 1)	Season 1, 2024: Karen Sevillano; Season 2, 2025: Andrés Altafulla; Season 3, 2026: Alejandro Estrada; Season 4, 2027: Upcoming season	Current; Carla Giraldo; Marcelo Cezán (2–); Former; Cristina Hurtado (1)
Croatia	Big Brother	RTL	Season 1, 2004: Saša Tkalčević; Season 2, 2005: Hamdija Seferović; Season 3, 2006: Danijel Rimanić; Season 4, 2007: Vedran Lovrenčić; Season 5, 2008: Krešimir Duvančić; Season 6, 2016: Romano Obilinović; Season 7, 2018: Antonio Orač	Daria Knez (1); Neno Pavinčić (1, 6); Boris Mirković (1–3); Renata Sopek (2–4); Antonija Blaće (2–5, 7); Filip Brajković (4); Marko Lušić (5); Korana Gvozdić (5); Marijana Batinić (6)
Croatia	Celebrity Big Brother	RTL	Season 1, 2008: Danijela Dvornik	Antonija Blaće; Marko Lušić
Czech Republic	Big Brother	TV Nova	Season 1, 2005: David Šín	Eva Aichmajerová (1); Lejla Abbasová (1); Leoš Mareš (1)
Czech Republic	Big Brother Česko & Slovensko (Czech Republic and Slovakia)	TV Nova; Voyo	Season 2, 2023–24: Stanislav Liška	Míra Hejda (2)
Denmark	Big Brother	TvDanmark	Season 1, 2001: Jill Liv Nielsen; Season 2, 2001: Carsten B. Berthelsen; Season 3, 2003: Johnni Johansen	Lisbeth Janniche
Denmark	Big Brother	Kanal 5 The Voice TV (live; 4); 7'eren (live; 5–6)	Season 4, 2012: Amanda Heisel; Season 5, 2013: Bjørn Clausen; Season 6, 2014: David Feldstedt	Marie Egede (4); Anne Kejser (5); Oliver Bjerrehuus (6)
Denmark	Big Brother VIP	TvDanmark	Season 1, 2003: Thomas Bickham	Lisbeth Janniche
Denmark	Big Brother Reality All-Stars	TvDanmark	Season 1, 2004: Jill Liv Nielsen	Lisbeth Janniche
Ecuador	Gran Hermano	Ecuavisa	Season 1, 2003: David Burbano	Toty Rodríguez
Finland	Big Brother Suomi	Sub	Season 1, 2005: Perttu Sirviö; Season 2, 2006: Sari Nygren; Season 3, 2007: Sauli Koskinen; Season 4, 2008: Anniina Mustajärvi; Season 5, 2009: Aso Alanso; Season 6, 2010: Niko Nousiainen; Season 7, 2011: Janica Kortman; Season 8, 2012: Teija Kurvinen; Season 10, 2014: Andte Gaup-Juuso	Mari Sainio (Kakko) (1–2, 10); Vappu Pimiä (3–5); Susanna Laine (6–7); Elina Kottonen (6–8)
Finland	Big Brother Suomi	Nelonen; Jim (11; Daily recaps); Ruutu.fi (stream; live 24/7)	Season 11, 2019: Kristian Heiskari; Season 12, 2020: Joel Jämsinen; Season 14, 2021: Jasmiina Yildiz; Big Brother 2022: Reeo Tiiainen	Elina Kottonen (11–12, 14); Kimmo Vehviläinen (11–14); Alma Hätönen (11–12, 14); Anni Hautala (13, 15); Tinni Wikström (13); Sami Kuronen (15); Janni Hussi (15)
Finland	Big Brother Suomi	MTV	Season 16, 2026: Upcoming season	TBA
Finland	Julkkis Big Brother (9); Celebrity Big Brother; Big Brother Suomi VIP (13)	Sub	Season 9, 2013: Jori Kopponen	Mari Sainio
Finland	Julkkis Big Brother (9); Celebrity Big Brother; Big Brother Suomi VIP (13)	Nelonen; Ruutu.fi (stream; live 24/7)	Season 13, 2021: Petra Maarit Olli	Anni Hautala; Tinni Wikström; Kimmo Vehviläinen
France	Loft Story	M6	Season 1, 2001: Christophe Mercy & Loana Petrucciani; Season 2, 2002: Karine Delgado & Thomas Saillofest	Benjamin Castaldi
France	Secret Story	TF1; NT1 (daily recaps and aftershow: 9); TFX (aftershow: 12); CanalSat (live: 1); TF1+ (live feed: 12)	Season 1, 2007: Marjorie, Cyrielle & Johanna Bluteau; Season 2, 2008: Matthias Pohl; Season 3, 2009: Emilie Nefnaf; Season 4, 2010: Benoît Dubois; Season 5, 2011: Marie Garet; Season 6, 2012: Nadège Lacroix; Season 7, 2013: Anaïs Camizuli; Season 8, 2014: Leila Ben Khalifa; Season 9, 2015: Émilie Fiorelli; Season 12, 2024: Alexis André Jr.	Benjamin Castaldi (1–8); Christophe Beaugrand (9–); After Secret; Adrien Lemaître (3–9); Nadège Lacroix (7); Leila Ben Khalifa (9); Julie Taton (9–10); Emilie Fiorelli (10); Julien Geloën (11)
France	Secret Story	NT1/TFX; TF1 (live launch: 10—11, 13); TF1+ (live feed: 13)	Season 10, 2016: Julien Geloën; Season 11, 2017: Noré Tir; Season 13, 2025: Romy Loyez	Benjamin Castaldi (1–8); Christophe Beaugrand (9–); After Secret; Adrien Lemaître (3–9); Nadège Lacroix (7); Leila Ben Khalifa (9); Julie Taton (9–10); Emilie Fiorelli (10); Julien Geloën (11)
France	Secret Story	TMC; TF1 (live launch: 14); TF1+ (live feed: 14)	Season 14, 2026: Paola Cavalli	Benjamin Castaldi (1–8); Christophe Beaugrand (9–); After Secret; Adrien Lemaître (3–9); Nadège Lacroix (7); Leila Ben Khalifa (9); Julie Taton (9–10); Emilie Fiorelli (10); Julien Geloën (11)
Germany	Big Brother	RTL II; Single TV (2); RTL (2–3); MTV2 Pop (4–5); Tele 5 (4–6); 9Live (8); VIVA (5, 9); Premiere (live; 5–9); Clipfish (live; 10–11); Sky (live; 10–11)	Season 1, 2000: John Milz; Season 2, 2000: Alida Nadine Kurras; Season 3, 2001: Karina Schreiber; Season 4, 2003: Jan Geilhufe; Season 5, 2004–05: Sascha Sirtl; Season 6, 2005–06: Michael Knopf; Season 7, 2007: Michael Carstensen; Season 8, 2008: Silke Kaufmann; Season 9, 2008–09: Daniel Schöller; Season 10, 2010: Timo Grätsch; Season 11, 2011: Marc Sonnen	Percy Hoven (1); Oliver Geissen (2–3); Aleksandra Bechtel (4, 10–11); Ruth Moschner (5–6); Oliver Petszokat (6); Charlotte Karlinder (7–8); Miriam Pielhau (8–9); Sonja Zietlow (Opening show, 11)
Germany	Big Brother	sixx Sky (live; 12); 7TV (stream; 12); Joyn (live, daily recaps; 15–)	Season 12, 2015: Lusy Skaya; Season 15, 2025: Marcel Schiefelbein	Jochen Bendel; Elena Gruschka (15–); Jochen Schropp (15–); Melissa Khalaj (15–)
Germany	Big Brother	Sat.1 sixx (Weekly recaps; 13); Joyn (live, daily recaps; 14)	Season 13, 2020: Cedric Beidinger; Season 14, 2024: Marcus Bräuer	Jochen Schropp
Germany	Promi Big Brother	Sat.1 sixx (Daily recaps; 2–4, 6–8); IGTV (Daily recaps; 7–); Sat.1 emotions (1); Sky (live 3 hours; 1, live; 3) maxdome (live; 2); Bild (live; 4); 7TV (stream; 2–6); Joyn (stream; 7–; live feed; 11–)	Season 1, 2013: Jenny Elvers; Season 2, 2014: Aaron Troschke; Season 3, 2015: David Odonkor; Season 4, 2016: Ben Tewaag; Season 5, 2017: Jens Hilbert; Season 6, 2018: Silvia Wollny; Season 7, 2019: Janine Meissner; Season 8, 2020: Werner Hansch; Season 9, 2021: Melanie Müller; Season 10, 2022: Rainer Gottwald; Season 11, 2023: Yeliz Koc; Season 12, 2024: Leyla Lahouar; Season 13, 2025: Jimi Blue Ochsenknecht; Season 14, 2026: Upcoming season	Current; Jochen Schropp (2–); Marlene Lufen (6–); Former; Cindy aus Marzahn (1); Oliver Pocher (1); Jochen Bendel (5)
Greece; Cyprus	Big Brother	ANT1	Season 1, 2001: Giorgos Triantafyllidis; Season 2, 2002: Alexandros Moskhos; Season 3, 2003: Thodores Jspógloy; Season 4, 2005: Nikos Papadopoulos	Andreas Mikroutsikos (1–3); Tatiana Stefanidou (4)
Greece; Cyprus	Big Brother	Alpha TV; Sigma TV; Nova (live)	Season 5, 2010–11: Giannis Foukakis	Roula Koromila
Greece; Cyprus	Big Brother	Skai TV; Sigma TV	Season 6, 2020: Anna-Maria Psycharaki; Season 7, 2021: Nikos Taklis; Season 8, 2025: Christos Ntentopoulos	Harry Varthakouris (6); Grigoris Gountaras (7); Natali Kakava (7); Petros Lagoutis (8)
Hungary	Big Brother	TV2	Season 1, 2002: Éva Párkányi; Season 2, 2003: Zsófi Tóth	Claudia Liptai; Attila Till
Hungary	Big Brother VIP	TV2	Season 1, 2003: Gábor Bochkor; Season 2, 2003: Lajos Boros; Season 3, 2003: Zolee Ganxsta	Claudia Liptai; Attila Till
Hungary	Való Világ powered by Big Brother	RTL+ (12; live stream; 11–12); RTL Kettő (8–11); RTL (live launch; 12); Cool TV (12)	Season 8, 2016: Soma Farkas; Season 9, 2018–19: Zsuzsanna Varga; Season 10, 2020–21: Vivien Szilágyi; Season 11, 2022–23: Krisztina Karnics; Season 12, 2024: Ádi Farkas	Current; Peti Puskás (9–); Csilla Megyeri (12–); Former; Bence Istenes (6–8); Anikó Nádai (8–11); Vanda Schumacher (11)
India (Hindi-language)	Bigg Boss (Television edition)	SET (1)	Season 1, 2006–07: Rahul Roy	Arshad Warsi
India (Hindi-language)	Bigg Boss (Television edition)	Colors TV (2–); Voot (live; 4–16); Jio Cinema (live; 17, 18); JioHotstar (live; 19–)	Season 2, 2008: Ashutosh Kaushik; Season 3, 2009: Vindu Dara Singh; Season 4, 2010–11: Shweta Tiwari; Season 5, 2011–12: Juhi Parmar; Season 6, 2012–13: Urvashi Dholakia; Season 7, 2013: Gauahar Khan; Season 8, 2014–15: Gautam Gulati; Season 9, 2015–16: Prince Narula; Season 10, 2016–17: Manveer Gurjar; Season 11, 2017–18: Shilpa Shinde; Season 12, 2018: Dipika Kakar; Season 13, 2019–20: Sidharth Shukla; Season 14, 2020–21: Rubina Dilaik; Season 15, 2021–22: Tejasswi Prakash; Season 16, 2022–23: MC Stan; Season 17, 2023–24: Munawar Faruqui; Season 18, 2024–25: Karan Veer Mehra; Season 19, 2025: Gaurav Khanna; Season 20, 2026: Current season	Current; Salman Khan (4–); Former; Shilpa Shetty (2); Amitabh Bachchan (3); Sanjay Dutt (5)
India (Hindi-language)	Bigg Boss Halla Bol (Spin-off)	Colors TV	Season 1, 2015: Gautam Gulati	Farah Khan
India (Hindi-language)	Bigg Boss OTT (Digital edition)	Voot (live; 1); JioCinema (live; 2–)	Season 1, 2021: Divya Agarwal; Season 2, 2023: Elvish Yadav; Season 3, 2024: Sana Makbul	Current; Anil Kapoor (3–); Former; Karan Johar (1); Salman Khan (2)
India (Kannada-language)	Bigg Boss Kannada (Television edition)	ETV Kannada (1)	Season 1, 2013: Vijay Raghavendra	Sudeepa
India (Kannada-language)	Bigg Boss Kannada (Television edition)	Asianet Suvarna (2)	Season 2, 2014: Akul Balaji	Sudeepa
India (Kannada-language)	Bigg Boss Kannada (Television edition)	Colors Kannada (3–4; 7–); Colors Super (4–6); Voot (live; 3–9); Jio Cinema (live; 10,11); JioHotstar (live;12–)	Season 3, 2015–16: Shruthi; Season 4, 2016–17: Pratham; Season 5, 2017–18: Chandan Shetty; Season 6, 2018–19: Shashi Kumar; Season 7, 2019–20: Shine Shetty; Season 8, 2021: Manju Pavagada; Season 9, 2022: Roopesh Shetty; Season 10, 2023–24: Karthik Mahesh; Season 11, 2024–25: Hanumantha Lamani; Season 12, 2025–26: Gilli Nata; Season 13, 2026: Current season	Sudeepa
India (Kannada-language)	Bigg Boss Mini Season (Spin-off)	Colors Kannada	Season 1, 2021: No Winner	Sudeepa
India (Kannada-language)	Bigg Boss Kannada OTT (Digital edition)	Voot (live; 1)	Season 1, 2022: Roopesh Shetty, Aryavardhan Guruji, Rakesh Adiga and Sanya Iyer	Sudeepa
India (Kannada-language)	Bigg Boss Agniparikshe (Spin-off)	Colors Kannada; JioHotstar	Season 1, 2026: No winner	Niranjan Deshpande
India (Malayalam-language)	Malayalee House	Surya TV	Season 1, 2013: Rahul Easwar	Revathi
India (Malayalam-language)	Bigg Boss Malayalam	Asianet; Hotstar (1,2); Disney+ Hotstar (live;3–6); JioHotstar (live; 7–)	Season 1, 2018: Sabumon Abdusamad; Season 2, 2020: Discontinued; Season 3, 2021: Manikuttan; Season 4, 2022: Dilsha Prasannan; Season 5, 2023: Akhil Marar; Season 6, 2024: Jinto Bodycraft; Season 7, 2025: Anumol RS; Season 8, 2026: Current season	Mohanlal
India (Malayalam-language)	Bigg Boss Agnipareeksha (Spin-off)	Asianet; JioHotstar	Season 1, 2026: No winner	Reneesha Rahiman
India (Bengali-language)	Bigg Boss Bangla	ETV Bangla	Season 1, 2013: Aneek Dhar	Mithun Chakraborty
India (Bengali-language)	Bigg Boss Bangla	Colors Bangla; Voot	Season 2, 2016: Joyjeet Banerjee	Jeet
India (Bengali-language)	Bigg Boss Bangla	Star Jalsha (3); JioHotstar (3)	Season 3, 2026: Current season	Sourav Ganguly
India (Tamil-language)	Bigg Boss Tamil (Television edition)	Star Vijay; Hotstar (1–3); Disney+ Hotstar (live;4–8); JioHotstar (live; 9–)	Season 1, 2017: Arav; Season 2, 2018: Riythvika; Season 3, 2019: Mugen Rao; Season 4, 2020–21: Aari Aarjunan; Season 5, 2021–22: Raju Jeyamohan; Season 6, 2022–23: Mohammed Azeem; Season 7, 2023–24: Archana Ravichandran; Season 8, 2024–25: Muthukumaran Jegatheesan; Season 9, 2025–26: Divya Ganesh; Season 10, 2026: Current season	Current; Vijay Sethupathi (8–); Former; Kamal Haasan (1–7)
India (Tamil-language)	Bigg Boss Ultimate (Digital edition)	Disney+ Hotstar (Live; 1)	Season 1, 2022: Balaji Murugadoss	Silambarasan
India (Tamil-language)	Bigg Boss The Common Man (Spin-off)	Star Vijay; JioHotstar	Season 1, 2026: No winner	Maya S. Krishnan
India (Telugu-language)	Bigg Boss Telugu (Television edition)	Star Maa; Hotstar (1–3); Disney+ Hotstar (live;4–8); JioHotstar (live; 9–)	Season 1, 2017: Siva Balaji; Season 2, 2018: Kaushal Manda; Season 3, 2019: Rahul Sipligunj; Season 4, 2020: Abijeet; Season 5, 2021: VJ Sunny; Season 6, 2022: L. V. Revanth; Season 7, 2023: Pallavi Prashanth; Season 8, 2024: Nikhil Maliyakkal; Season 9, 2025: Kalyan Padala; Season 10, 2026: Current season	Current; Nagarjuna (3–); Former; Jr. NTR (1); Nani (2)
India (Telugu-language)	Bigg Boss Non-Stop (Digital edition)	Disney+ Hotstar (live; 1)	Season 1, 2022: Bindu Madhavi	Nagarjuna
India (Telugu-language)	Bigg Boss Agnipariksha (Spin-off)	Star Maa; JioHotstar	Season 1, 2025: No winner; Season 2, 2026: No winner	Sreemukhi
India (Marathi-language)	Bigg Boss Marathi	Colors Marathi; Voot (live; 1–3); Jio Cinema (live; 5); Jio Hotstar (6)	Season 1, 2018: Megha Dhade; Season 2, 2019: Shiv Thakare; Season 3, 2021: Vishal Nikam; Season 4, 2022–23: Akshay Kelkar; Season 5, 2024: Suraj Chavan; Season 6, 2026: Tanvi Kolte	Current; Riteish Deshmukh (5-); Former; Mahesh Manjrekar (1–4)
Indonesia	Big Brother Indonesia	Trans TV SCTV	Season 1, 2011: Alan Wangsa	Ferdi Hassan; Indra Herlambang; Sarah Sechan; Shara Aryo; Raffi Ahmad; Syifa Hadju
Israel	האח הגדול; HaAh HaGadol; Big Brother	Channel 2-Keshet; Hot (live) yes (live)	Season 1, 2008: Shifra Cornfeld; Season 2, 2009–10: Eliraz Sade; Season 3, 2010–11: Yaakov "Jackie" Menahem; Season 4, 2012: Yekutiel "Kuti" Sabag; Season 5, 2013: Tahounia Rubel; Season 6, 2014: Tal Gilboa; Season 7, 2015–16: Shay Mika Ifrah; Season 8, 2016–17: Avihai Ohana	Erez Tal (1–8); Assi Azar (1–6); Korin Gideon (7–8)
Israel	האח הגדול; HaAh HaGadol; Big Brother	Channel 13; Channel 26 (live)	Season 9, 2018: Israel Ogalbo; Season 10, 2020: Tikva Gidon; Season 11, 2020–21: Zehava Ben; Season 12, 2022: Talia Ovadia; Season 13, 2023: Yuval Maatook; Season 14, 2024: Or Ben David; Season 15, 2025: Yovel Levi; Season 16, 2026: Gal Rubin	Current; Liron Weizman; Guy Zu-Aretz (10–); Guest; Kevin Rubin (16); Former; Ofer Shechter (9); Asi Israelof (9)
Israel	VIP האח הגדול; HaAh HaGadol VIP; Big Brother VIP	Channel 2-Keshet; Hot (live); Yes (live)	Season 1, 2009: Dudi Melitz; Season 2, 2015: Moshik Afia	Erez Tal (1–2); Assi Azar (1–2)
Israel	VIP האח הגדול; HaAh HaGadol VIP; Big Brother VIP	Channel 13; Channel 26 (live)	Season 3, 2019: Asaf Goren; Season 4, 2021: Oren Hazan	Liron Weizman; Guy Zu-Aretz
Italy	Grande Fratello	Canale 5 Italia 1 (Daily recaps; 13–); Stream TV (live; 1–3); Sky (live; 4–5, 8–9); Mediaset Premium (live; 6–14); Mediaset Extra (live; 15–); La5 (live; 11–)	Season 1, 2000: Cristina Plevani; Season 2, 2001: Flavio Montrucchio; Season 3, 2003: Floriana Secondi; Season 4, 2004: Serena Garitta; Season 5, 2004: Jonathan Kashanian; Season 6, 2006: Augusto De Megni; Season 7, 2007: Milo Coretti; Season 8, 2008: Mario Ferretti; Season 9, 2009: Ferdi Berisa; Season 10, 2009–10: Mauro Marin; Season 11, 2010–11: Andrea Cocco; Season 12, 2011–12: Sabrina Mbarek; Season 13, 2014: Mirco Petrilli; Season 14, 2015: Federica Lepanto; Season 15, 2018: Alberto Mezzetti; Season 16, 2019: Martina Nasoni; Season 17, 2023–24: Perla Vatiero; Season 18, 2024–25: Jessica Morlacchi; Season 19, 2025: Anita Mazzotta	Current; Simona Ventura (19–); Former; Daria Bignardi (1–2); Barbara D'Urso (3–5, 15–16); Alessia Marcuzzi (6–14); Alfonso Signorini (17–18)
Italy	Grande Fratello VIP	Canale 5 Italia 1 (Daily recaps); Mediaset Extra (live); La5 (live)	Season 1, 2016: Alessia Macari; Season 2, 2017: Daniele Bossari; Season 3, 2018: Walter Nudo; Season 4, 2020: Paola Di Benedetto; Season 5, 2020–21: Tommaso Zorzi; Season 6, 2021–22: Jessica Hailé Selassié; Season 7, 2022–23: Nikita Pelizon; Season 8, 2026: Alessandra Mussolini; Season 9, 2026: Current season	Current; Ilary Blasi (1–3; 8—); Former; Alfonso Signorini (4–7)
Italy	The Couple - Una vittoria per due (Spin-off)	Canale 5 Italia 1 (Daily recaps); Mediaset Extra (live); La5 (live)	Season 1, 2025: Discontinued	Ilary Blasi
Kosovo	Big Brother VIP Kosova	Klan Kosova; Artmotion (live)	Season 1, 2022–23: Arkimed "Stresi" Lushaj; Season 2, 2023–24: Lumbardh Salihu; Season 3, 2024–25: Drilon Rama; Season 4, 2025–26: Londrim Mekaj; Season 5, 2026–27: Upcoming season	Current; Alaudin Hamiti; Former; Jonida Vokshi (1–4)
Lithuania	Paslapčių namai The House of Secrets	TV3	Season 1, 2013: Gintautas Katulis	Agnė Grigaliūnienė; Marijus Mikutavičius
Malta	Big Brother Malta	TVM	Season 1, 2025: Jay Vella; Season 2, 2027: Upcoming season	Ryan Borg; Josmar Gatt
Mexico	Big Brother México; Big Brother PM (4)	Televisa; Sky (live)	Season 1, 2002: Rocío Cárdenas; Season 2, 2003: Silvia Irabien; Season 3, 2005: Evelyn Nieto	Adela Micha (1–2); Verónica Castro (3)
Mexico	Big Brother México; Big Brother PM (4)	Canal 5 Sky (live)	Season 4, 2015: Eduardo "Chile" Miranda	Adela Micha
Mexico	Big Brother VIP	Televisa; Sky (live)	Season 1, 2002: Galilea Montijo; Season 2, 2003: Omar Chaparro; Season 3.1, 2004: Eduardo Videgaray; Season 3.2, 2004: Roxanna Castellanos; Season 4, 2005: Sasha Sökol	Víctor Trujillo (1); Verónica Castro (2–4)
Mexico	La casa de los famosos México; The House of the Famous Mexico	Las Estrellas; Canal 5 ViX (live)	Season 1, 2023: Wendy Guevara; Season 2, 2024: Mario Bezares; Season 3, 2025: Aldo de Nigris; Season 4, 2026: Current season	Galilea Montijo; Diego de Erice; Odalys Ramirez
Mongolia	Big Brother Mongolia	Mongol TV	Season 1, 2021: Enku Bulgan	Unknown
Netherlands	Big Brother (Original edition)	Veronica	Season 1, 1999: Bart Spring in 't Veld; Season 2, 2000: Bianca Hagenbeek	Rolf Wouters (1); Daphne Deckers (1); Esther Duller (2); Beau Van Erven Dorens (2)
Netherlands	Big Brother (Original edition)	Yorin	Season 3, 2001: Sandy Boots; Season 4, 2002: Jeanette Godefroy	Patty Brard (3); Martijn Krabbé (4)
Netherlands	Big Brother (Original edition)	Talpa	Season 5, 2005: Joost Hoebink; Season 6, 2006: Jeroen Visser	Bridget Maasland (5–6); Ruud de Wild (5)
Netherlands	Big Brother (Netherlands and Belgium)	RTL 5 Videoland (stream; live)	Season 1, 2021: Jill Goede; Season 2, 2022: Salar Abassi Abrassi; Season 3, 2023: Bart Vandenbroek; Season 4, 2024: Glenn Van Himst; Season 5, 2025: Jordy de Maar	Current; Geraldine Kemper; Tatyana Beloy (3-); Former; Peter Van de Veire (1–2)
Netherlands	Big Brother VIPs (1); Hotel Big Brother (2)	Veronica	Season 1, 2000: No winner	Unknown
Netherlands	Big Brother VIPs (1); Hotel Big Brother (2)	Talpa	Season 2, 2006: No winner	Caroline Tensen
Netherlands	Secret Story	Net5	Season 1, 2011: Sharon Hooijkaas	Renate Verbaan; Bart Boonstra
Nigeria	Big Brother Nigeria (1); Big Brother Naija (2–8)	M-Net; DStv (live)	Season 1, 2006: Katung Aduwak	Olisa Adibua; Michelle Dede
Nigeria	Big Brother Nigeria (1); Big Brother Naija (2–8)	Africa Magic; GOtv; DStv (live)	Season 2, 2017: Efe Ejeba; Season 3, 2018: Miracle Ikechukwu Igbokwe; Season 4, 2019: Mercy Eke; Season 5, 2020: Olamilekan "Laycon" Agbeleshe; Season 6, 2021: Hazel Oyeze "Whitemoney" Onou; Season 7, 2022: Ijeoma Josephina "Phyna" Otabor; Season 8, 2023: Ilebaye Odiniya; Season 9, 2024: Kingsley "KellyRae" Sule; Season 10, 2025: Opeyemi "Imisi" Ayanwale; Season 11, 2026: Current season	Ebuka Obi-Uchendu
Nigeria	Big Brother Titans (Nigeria and South Africa)	Africa Magic; DStv (stream; live)	Season 1, 2023 : Khosi Twala	Lawrence Maleka; Ebuka Obi-Uchendu
Norway	Big Brother	TVN	Season 1, 2001: Lars Joakim Ringom; Season 2, 2002: Veronica Agnes Roso; Season 3, 2003: Eva Lill Baukhol	Arve Juritzen (1–2); Trygve Rønningen (3)
Norway	Big Brother	TV 2 Bliss	Season 4, 2011: Tine Barstad	Petter Pilgaard; Sarah Natasha Melbye
Pacific Region (Chile, Ecuador and Peru)	Gran Hermano del Pacífico	RedTeleSistema; RED Televisión; ATV	Season 1, 2005: Juan Sebastián López	Lorena Meritano (Main); Álvaro Ballera & Álvaro García (Regional); Janine Leal (Regional); Juan Francisco Escobar (Regional)
Pakistan	Tamasha	ARY Digital; ARY Zap	Season 1, 2022: Umer Aalam; Season 2, 2023: Aruba Mirza; Season 3, 2024: Malik Aqeel; Season 4, 2025: Saif Ali Khan	Adnan Siddiqui
Panama	Big Brother Panamá	TVN	Season 1, 2016: Katherine Sandoval	Rolando Sterling; Gaby Garrido
Paraguay	Gran Hermano Paraguay	Telefuturo	Season 1, 2027: Upcoming season	TBA
Peru	La Casa de Los Secretos; The House of Secrets	Frecuencia Latina	Season 1, 2012: Álvaro de la Torre	Carla García; Jason Day
Philippines	Pinoy Big Brother	Current GMA Network (12–) Former; A2Z (9–11); TV5 (9, 11); Kapamilya Channel (9–11); ABS-CBN (1–8); TFC (Worldwide); Kumu (live; 9–10); Lazada (live; 11); Sky Cable (live; 1–4); Studio 23 (live; 1–3)	Season 1, 2005: Nene Tamayo; Season 2, 2007: Beatriz Saw; Season 3, 2009–10: Melisa Cantiveros; Season 4, 2011–12: Slater Young; Season 5, 2014: Daniel Matsunaga; Season 6, 2015: Miho Nishida & Jimboy Martin; Season 7, 2016–17: Maymay Entrata; Season 8, 2018–19: Yamyam Gucong; Season 9, 2020–21: Liofer Pinatacan; Season 10, 2021–22: Anji Salvacion; Season 11, 2024: Fyang Smith; Season 12, 2026: Upcoming season	Current; Bianca Gonzalez (2–); Robi Domingo (4–); Melisa Cantiveros (8–); Kim Chiu (8–); Enchong Dee (6, 9–); Alexa Ilacad (11); Former; Toni Gonzaga (1–10); Maymay Entrata (9–10); Richard Juan (9–10); Edward Barber (9–10); Mariel Rodriguez (1–3, 7); John Prats (5); Alex Gonzaga (5, 8); Willie Revillame (1)
Philippines	Pinoy Big Brother: Celebrity Edition	Current GMA Network (3–) Former; ABS-CBN (1–2); TFC (Worldwide); Sky Cable (live; 1–2); Studio 23 (live; 1–2)	Season 1, 2006: Keanna Reeves; Season 2, 2007–08: Ruben Gonzaga; Season 3, 2025: Brent Manalo & Mika Salamanca; Season 4, 2025–26: Caprice Cayetano & Lella Ford	Current; Luis Manzano (1, 4–); Bianca Gonzalez (2–); Robi Domingo (3–); Melai Cantiveros (3–); Kim Chiu (3–); Enchong Dee (3–); Alexa Ilacad (3–); Gabbi Garcia (3–); Mavy Legaspi (3–); Former; Toni Gonzaga (1–2); Mariel Rodriguez (1–2)
Philippines	Pinoy Big Brother: Teen Edition	ABS-CBN (1–4); TFC (Worldwide); Sky Cable (live; 1–4); Studio 23 (live; 1–3)	Season 1, 2006: Kim Chiu; Season 2, 2008: Ejay Falcon; Season 3, 2010: James Reid; Season 4, 2012: Myrtle Abigail Sarrosa	Bianca Gonzalez (1–4); Mariel Rodriguez (1–3); Toni Gonzaga (2–4); Luis Manzano (2); Robi Domingo (4); John Prats (4)
Poland	Big Brother	TVN	Season 1, 2001: Janusz Dzięcioł; Season 2, 2001: Marzena Wieczorek; Season 3, 2002: Piotr Borucki	Grzegorz Miecugow (1–3); Martyna Wojciechowska (1–3); Andrzej Sołtysik (2–3)
Poland	Big Brother	TV4	Season 4, 2007: Jolanta Rutowicz; Season 5 (part 2), 2008: Janusz Strączek	Jakub Klawiter (4–5); Karina Kunkiewicz (4); Małgorzata Kosik (5)
Poland	Big Brother	TVN 7	Season 6, 2019: Magda Wójcik; Season 7, 2019: Kamil Lemieszewski	Agnieszka Woźniak-Starak (6); Gabi Drzewiecka (7)
Poland	Big Brother VIP	TV4	Season 5 (part 1), 2008: Jarosław Jakimowicz	Jakub Klawiter; Małgorzata Kosik
Portugal	Big Brother	TVI; TVI Reality (live; 5–); TVI Internacional (5); TVI Eventos (live; 1)	Season 1, 2000: Zé Maria Seleiro; Season 2, 2001: Henrique Guimarães; Season 3, 2001: Catarina Cabral; Season 4, 2003: Fernando Geraldes; Season 5, Spring 2020: Soraia Moreira; Season 6, Autumn 2020: Zena Pacheco; Season 7, 2021: Ana Barbosa; Season 8, 2022: Miguel Vicente; Season 9, 2023: Francisco Monteiro; Season 10, 2024: Inês Morais; Season 11, 2025: Luís Gonçalves	Current; Cláudio Ramos (5; 7; 10–); Former; Teresa Guilherme (1–4; 6); Manuel Luís Goucha (7); Cristina Ferreira (8–9)
Portugal	Big Brother Famosos (1–2, 4–); Big Brother VIP (3)	TVI; TVI Direct (live; VIP)	Season 1, 2002: Ricardo Vieira; Season 2, 2002: Vítor Norte; Season 3, 2013: Pedro Guedes; Season 4, 2022: Francisco "Kasha" Pereira; Season 5, 2022: Bernardo Sousa	Current; Cristina Ferreira (4–); Former; Teresa Guilherme (1–3)
Portugal	Big Brother: Duplo Impacto; Big Brother: Double Impact	TVI; TVI Reality (live)	Season 1, 2021: Joana Albuquerque	Teresa Guilherme; Cláudio Ramos
Portugal	Big Brother: Desafio Final; Big Brother: Final Challenge	TVI; TVI Reality (live)	Season 1, 2022: Bruna Gomes; Season 2, 2024: Bruno Savate	Current; Cláudio Ramos (2–); Former; Cristina Ferreira (1)
Portugal	Big Brother Verão; Big Brother Summer	TVI; TVI Reality (live)	Season 1, 2025: Jéssica Vieira; Season 2, 2026: Sara Alves	Maria Botelho Moniz
Portugal	Big Brother: All Stars	TVI; TVI Reality (live)	Season 1, 2026: Current season	Maria Botelho Moniz
Portugal	Secret Story: Casa dos Segredos; Secret Story: House of Secrets	TVI; TVI Reality (live; 6–); TVI Direct (live; 1–5)	Season 1, 2010: António Queirós; Season 2, 2011: João Mota; Season 3, 2012: Rúben Boa Nova; Season 4, 2013: Luís Nascimento; Season 5, 2014: Elisabete Moutinho; Season 6, 2016: Helena Patrício; Season 7, 2018: Tiago Rufino; Season 8, 2024: Diogo Alexandre; Season 9, 2025: Pedro Jorge; Season 10, 2026: Eva Pais	Júlia Pinheiro (1); Teresa Guilherme (2–6); Manuel Luís Goucha (7); Cristina Ferreira (8–)
Portugal	Secret Story: Desafio Final; Secret Story: Final Challenge	TVI; TVI Reality (live; 6–); TVI Direct (live; 1–5)	Season 1, 2013: Cátia Palhinha; Season 2, 2014: Érica Silva; Season 3, 2015: Sofia Sousa; Season 4, 2017: Carlos Sousa; Season 5, 2025: Inês Morais; Season 6, 2026: Pedro Jorge	Current; Cristina Ferreira (6–); Former; Teresa Guilherme (1–4); Cláudio Ramos (5)
Portugal	Secret Story: Luta Pelo Poder; Secret Story: Power Struggle	TVI; TVI Reality (live; 6–); TVI Direct (live; 1–5)	Season 1, 2015: Bruno Sousa	Teresa Guilherme
Portugal	Secret Story: O Reencontro; Secret Story: The Reunion	TVI; TVI Reality (live; 6–); TVI Direct (live; 1–5)	Season 1, 2018: Carina Ferreira	Manuel Luís Goucha
Romania	Big Brother România Big Brother Romania	Prima TV	Season 1, 2003: Sorin Pavel Fisteag; Season 2, 2004: Iustin Popovici	Andreea Raicu; Virgil Ianțu
Russia	Большой Брат; Bolshoy Brat; Big Brother	TNT	Season 1, 2005: Anastasia Yagaylova	Ingeborga Dapkunaite
Scandinavia (Norway and Sweden)	Big Brother	Kanal 5 FEM	Season 1, 2005: Britt Goodwin; Season 2, 2006: Jessica Lindgren	Brita Møystad Engseth (1–2); Adam Alsing (1); Hannah Rosander (2)
Scandinavia (Norway and Sweden)	Big Brother	Kanal 9 FEM	Season 3, 2014: Anders Olsson	Pia Lykke; Adam Alsing
Second Life	Big Brother Second Life	World Wide Web	Season 1, 2006: Madlen Flint	None
Slovakia	Big Brother: Súboj (1); Big Brother: Duel	Markíza	Season 1, 2005: Richard Tkáč	Viliam Rozboril (1); Zuzana Belohorcová (1)
Slovakia	Big Brother Česko & Slovensko (Czech Republic and Slovakia)	Markíza; Voyo	Season 2, 2023–24: Stanislav Liška	Míra Hejda (2)
Slovenia	Big Brother	Kanal A	Season 1, 2007: Andrej Novak; Season 2, 2008: Naske Mehić; Season 3, 2015: Pia Filipčič; Season 4, 2016: Mirela Lapanović	Main hosts: Nina Osenar (1–2); Ana Maria Mitič (3); Manja Plešnar (4); Co-hosts: Matej Grm-Gušti (2); Emi Nikočević (4); Tibor Baiee (4)
Slovenia	Big Brother Slavnih; Big Brother Famous	Pop TV	Season 1, 2010: Jože Činč	Nina Osenar
South Africa	Big Brother South Africa	M-Net; Mzansi Magic; Mzansi Wethu; DStv/GOtv (live)	Season 1, 2001: Ferdinand Rabie; Season 2, 2002: Richard Cawood	Mark Pilgrim; Gerry Rantseli
South Africa	Big Brother Mzansi	M-Net; Mzansi Magic; Mzansi Wethu; DStv/GOtv (live)		
South Africa	Big Brother Mzansi	M-Net; Mzansi Magic; Mzansi Wethu; DStv/GOtv (live)	Season 1, 2014: Mandla Hlatshwayo; Season 2, 2015: Nkanyiso "Ace" Khumalo & Ntombi Tshabalala; Season 3, 2022: Michelle "Mphowabadimo" Mvundla; Season 4, 2024: Siphephelo "McJunior" Zondi; Season 5, 2025: Akhonamathemba "Sweet Guluva" Mbele; Season 6, 2026: Liema Pantsi	Lungile Radu (1–2); Lawrence Maleka (3–4); Smash Afrika (5–)
South Africa	Celebrity Big Brother	M-Net; Mzansi Magic; Mzansi Wethu; DStv/GOtv (live)	Season 1, 2002: Bill Flynn	Mark Pilgrim; Gerry Rantseli
South Africa	Big Brother Titans (Nigeria and South Africa)	M-Net; Mzansi Magic; Mzansi Wethu; DStv/GOtv (live)	Season 1, 2023: Khosi Twala	Lawrence Maleka; Ebuka Obi-Uchendu
Spain	Gran Hermano	Telecinco (Main show and Debate); Telecinco Estrellas (9); Telecinco 2 (10); LaSiete (11–14); Nueve (14); Divinity (15–18); Be Mad (live; 18); Quiero TV (live; 1–3); Vía Digital (live; 4–5); Digital+ (live; 6–11); GH 24H (live; 12); Mitele (live; 13–20)	Season 1, 2000: Ismael Beiro; Season 2, 2001: Sabrina Mahí; Season 3, 2002: Javito García; Season 4, 2002–03: Pedro Oliva; Season 5, 2003–04: Nuria Yáñez; Season 6, 2004: Juanjo Mateo; Season 7, 2005–06: Pepe Herrero; Season 8, 2006: Naiala Melo; Season 9, 2007: Judit Iglesias; Season 10, 2008–09: Iván Madrazo; Season 11, 2009–10: Ángel Muñoz; Season 12, 2010–11: Laura Campos; Season 13, 2012: Pepe Flores; Season 14, 2013: Susana Molina; Season 15, 2014: Paula González; Season 16, 2015: Sofía Suescun; Season 17, 2016: Beatriz Retamal; Season 18, 2017: Hugo Sierra; Season 19, 2024: Juan Luis Quintana; Season 20, 2025: Rocío Gallardo	Main host: Mercedes Milá (1–2, 4–16); Pepe Navarro (3); Jorge Javier Vázquez (17–); Debate: Jesús Vázquez (4–5); Carolina Ferre (6); Jordi González (7–9, 11–13, 15–18); Jorge Javier Vázquez (10); Frank Blanco (14); Ion Aramendi (19–)
Spain	Uno de GH20 (Spin-off) (Digital edition)	Mitele	Season 1, 2025: Joon Choi	Nagore Robles
Spain	Gran Hermano VIP	Telecinco (Main show and Debate); Cuatro (7); Divinity (3–6); Be Mad (live; 6); Mitele (live; 3–8)	Season 1, 2004: Marlène Mourreau; Season 2, 2005: Ivonne Armant; Season 3, 2015: Belén Esteban; Season 4, 2016: Laura Matamoros; Season 5, 2017: Alyson Eckmann; Season 6, 2018: Miriam Saavedra; Season 7, 2019: Adara Molinero; Season 8, 2023: Naomi Asensi	Main host: Jesús Vázquez (1–2); Jordi González (3–5; 7); Jorge Javier Vázquez (6–7); Marta Flich (8); Debate: Carolina Ferre (1); Jordi González (2–3; 7); Sandra Barneda (4–6); Ion Aramendi (8)
Spain	Gran Hermano 12+1: La Re-vuelta; Gran Hermano 12+1: The Revolt	Telecinco (Main show and Debate); LaSiete; Mitele (live)	Season 1, 2012: Alessandro Livi	Main host: Mercedes Milá; Debate: Jordi González
Spain	Gran Hermano Dúo	Telecinco (Main show and Debate); Divinity; Be Mad (live); Mitele (live); CincoMAS (Americas)	Season 1, 2019: María Jesús Ruiz; Season 2, 2024: Lucía Sánchez; Season 3, 2025: Marieta Sola; Season 4, 2026: Carlos Lozano	Main host: Jorge Javier Vázquez (1; 4); Jordi González (1); Marta Flich (2); Carlos Sobera (3); Debate: Jordi González (1); Ion Aramendi (2–)
Spain	Gran Hermano: El Reencuentro (1); El Reencuentro (2); The Reunion	Telecinco (Main show and Debate); LaSiete; Digital+ (live; 1)	Season 1, 2010: Pepe Herrero & Raquel López; Season 2, 2011: Juan Miguel Martínez & Yola Berrocal	Main host: Mercedes Milá (1); Jordi González (2); Debate: Jordi González (1); Christian Gálvez (2)
Spain	El Tiempo del Descuento	Telecinco; CincoMAS (Americas)	Season 1, 2020: Gianmarco Onestini	Main host: Jorge Javier Vázquez; Debate: Nuria Marín Font
Spain	Secret Story	Telecinco	Season 1, 2021: Luca Onestini; Season 2, 2022: Rafa Martinez	Main host: Jorge Javier Vázquez (1); Carlos Sobera (2); Countdown: Carlos Sobera (1); Sandra Barneda (2); Debate: Jordi González (1); Toñi Moreno (2)
Sweden	Big Brother Sverige	Kanal 5	Season 1, 2000: Angelica Freij; Season 2, 2002: Ulrica Andersson; Season 3, 2003: Danne Sörensen; Season 4, 2004: Carolina Gynning	Adam Alsing
Sweden	Big Brother Sverige	TV11	Season 5, 2011: Simon Danielsson; Season 6, 2012: Hanna Johansson	Gry Forssell
Sweden	Big Brother Sverige	Kanal 11	Season 7, 2015: Christian Sahlström	Adam Alsing
Sweden	Big Brother Sverige	Sjuan; TV4 Play (stream); C More (live); TV4 (8; Premiere)	Season 8, 2020: Sami Jakobsson; Season 9, 2021: Tanja Helen Ingebretsen Kallin	Malin Stenbäck (8–); Arantxa Álvarez (9); Adrian Boberg (8; Premiere)
Sweden	Big Brother Stjärnveckan; Big Brother Week of the Stars	Kanal 5	Season 1, 2002: Anki Lundberg	Adam Alsing
Switzerland	Big Brother Schweiz; Big Brother Switzerland	TV3	Season 1, 2000: Daniela Hahn; Season 2, 2001: Christian Ponleitner	Daniel Fohrler (1); Eva Wannemacher (2)
Thailand	Big Brother Thailand	iTV (1–2)	Season 1, 2005: Nipon Perktim; Season 2, 2006: Arisa Sonthirod	Saranyu Vonkarjun (1–2); Nana Raibeena (2)
Turkey	Big Brother Türkiye	Star TV	Season 1, 2015–16: Sinan Aydemir	Asuman Krause
Ukraine	Big Brother Україна; Big Brother Ukraine	K1	Season 1, 2011: Kristina Kotvickaja	Olha Horbachova; Oleksiy Kurban
United Kingdom	Big Brother	Channel 4 S4C (1–10); TVN Lingua (2–4)	Series 1, 2000: Craig Phillips; Series 2, 2001: Brian Dowling; Series 3, 2002: Kate Lawler; Series 4, 2003: Cameron Stout; Series 5, 2004: Nadia Almada; Series 6, 2005: Anthony Hutton; Series 7, 2006: Pete Bennett; Series 8, 2007: Brian Belo; Series 9, 2008: Rachel Rice; Series 10, 2009: Sophie Reade; Series 11, 2010: Josie Gibson	Davina McCall MBE
United Kingdom	Big Brother	Channel 5 MTV (16–19); TV3 (16–18); Virgin Media One (19)	Series 12, 2011: Aaron Allard-Morgan; Series 13, 2012: Luke Anderson; Series 14, 2013: Sam Evans; Series 15, 2014: Helen Wood; Series 16, 2015: Chloe Wilburn; Series 17, 2016: Jason Burrill; Series 18, 2017: Isabelle Warburton; Series 19, 2018: Cameron Cole	Brian Dowling (12–13); Emma Willis (14–19)
United Kingdom	Big Brother	ITV2; ITV (20, select live episodes); ITVX (stream, live feed) (20-22); Virgin Media One (20-21)	Series 20, 2023: Jordan Sangha; Series 21, 2024: Ali Bromley; Series 22, 2025: Richard Storry; Series 23, 2026: Current season	Will Best; AJ Odudu
United Kingdom	Celebrity Big Brother	Channel 4 BBC One (1); S4C (2–7)	Series 1, 2001: Jack Dee; Series 2, 2002: Mark Owen; Series 3, 2005: Bez; Series 4, 2006: Chantelle Houghton; Series 5, 2007: Shilpa Shetty; Series 6, 2009: Ulrika Jonsson; Series 7, 2010: Alex Reid	Davina McCall MBE
United Kingdom	Celebrity Big Brother	Channel 5 MTV (15–22); TV3 (16–18); 3e (19–22); Virgin Media Two (22)	Series 8, 2011: Paddy Doherty; Series 9, Winter 2012: Denise Welch; Series 10, Summer 2012: Julian Clary; Series 11, Winter 2013: Rylan Clark; Series 12, Summer 2013: Charlotte Crosby; Series 13, Winter 2014: Jim Davidson; Series 14, Summer 2014: Gary Busey; Series 15, Winter 2015: Katie Price; Series 16, Summer 2015: James Hill; Series 17, Winter 2016: Scott 'Scotty T' Timlin; Series 18, Summer 2016: Stephen Bear; Series 19, Winter 2017: Coleen Nolan; Series 20, Summer 2017: Sarah Harding; Series 21, Winter 2018: Shane Jenek / Courtney Act; Series 22, Summer 2018: Ryan Thomas	Brian Dowling (8–11); Emma Willis (12–22)
United Kingdom	Celebrity Big Brother	ITV; ITVX (stream, live feed); Virgin Media Two; Virgin Media Player	Series 23, 2024: David Potts; Series 24, 2025: Jack P. Shepherd	Will Best; AJ Odudu
United Kingdom	Teen Big Brother	Channel 4/E4; S4C	Series 1, 2003: Paul Brennan	Dermot O'Leary
United Kingdom	Big Brother Panto	Channel 4/E4; S4C	Series 1, 2004–05: No winner	Jeff Brazier; June Sarpong
United Kingdom	Big Brother: Celebrity Hijack	Channel 4/E4; S4C	Series 1, 2008: John Loughton	Dermot O'Leary
United Kingdom	Ultimate Big Brother	Channel 4/E4; S4C	Series 1, 2010: Brian Dowling	Davina McCall
United States (English)	Big Brother (Broadcast edition)	CBS; Showtime 2 (8–14); Pop (15–21); CBS.com/AOL (Live; 1); CBS All Access (Live; 15–22); Paramount+ (Live; 23–); Pluto TV (Live; 25–)	Season 1, 2000: Eddie McGee; Season 2, 2001: Will Kirby; Season 3, 2002: Lisa Donahue; Season 4, 2003: Jun Song; Season 5, 2004: Drew Daniel; Season 6, 2005: Maggie Ausburn; Season 8, 2007: Dick Donato; Season 9, Winter 2008: Adam Jasinski; Season 10, Summer 2008: Dan Gheesling; Season 11, 2009: Jordan Lloyd; Season 12, 2010: Hayden Moss; Season 13, 2011: Rachel Reilly; Season 14, 2012: Ian Terry; Season 15, 2013: Andy Herren; Season 16, 2014: Derrick Levasseur; Season 17, 2015: Steve Moses; Season 18, 2016: Nicole Franzel; Season 19, 2017: Josh Martinez; Season 20, 2018: Kaycee Clark; Season 21, 2019: Jackson Michie; Season 23, 2021: Xavier Prather; Season 24, 2022: Taylor Hale; Season 25, 2023: Jag Bains; Season 26, 2024: Chelsie Baham; Season 27, 2025: Ashley Hollis; Season 28, 2026: Current season	Current; Julie Chen Moonves; Former; Ian O'Malley (1); Guest; Jerry O'Connell (26)
United States (English)	Big Brother: All-Stars	CBS; Showtime 2 (8–14); Pop (15–21); CBS.com/AOL (Live; 1); CBS All Access (Live; 15–22); Paramount+ (Live; 23–); Pluto TV (Live; 25–)	Season 7, 2006: Mike "Boogie" Malin; Season 22, 2020: Cody Calafiore	Current; Julie Chen Moonves; Former; Ian O'Malley (1); Guest; Jerry O'Connell (26)
United States (English)	Big Brother: Over the Top (Digital edition)	CBS All Access	Season 1, 2016: Morgan Willett	Julie Chen Moonves
United States (English)	Celebrity Big Brother	CBS; Pop; CBS All Access (Live; 1–2); Paramount+ (Live; 3–)	Season 1, 2018: Marissa Jaret Winokur; Season 2, 2019: Tamar Braxton; Season 3, 2022: Miesha Tate	Julie Chen Moonves
United States (English)	Big Brother Reindeer Games	CBS; Paramount+	Season 1, 2023: Nicole Franzel-Arroyo	Derek Xiao; Tiffany Mitchell; Jordan Lloyd
United States (Spanish)	Gran Hermano	Telemundo	Season 1, 2016: Pedro Orta	Giselle Blondet
United States (Spanish)	La casa de los famosos The House of the Famous	Telemundo	Season 1, 2021: Alicia Machado; Season 2, 2022: Ivonne Montero; Season 3, 2023: Madison Anderson; Season 4, 2024: Maripily Rivera; Season 6, 2026: Fabio Agostini; Season 7, 2027: Upcoming season	Current; Jimena Gallego; Javier Poza (5–); Former; Héctor Sandarti (1–3); Nacho Lozano (4)
United States (Spanish)	La casa de los famosos: All-Stars; The House of the Famous: All-Stars	Telemundo	Season 5, 2025: Carlos "Caramelo" Cruz	Current; Jimena Gallego; Javier Poza (5–); Former; Héctor Sandarti (1–3); Nacho Lozano (4)
Uruguay	Gran Hermano Uruguay	Canal 10; AntelTV (live)	Season 1, 2026: Current season	Eduardo Gianarelli
Vietnam	Người Giấu Mặt; The person who hides his face Big Brother Vietnam	VTV6	Season 1, 2013–14: Hoàng Sơn Việt	Huy Khánh

== The Biggest Loser ==
Original name: The Biggest Loser
Origin: United States
Date started: October 19, 2004
Creator: Ben Silverman, Mark Koops, Dave Broome
First network to broadcast: NBC
First country to adapt: United Kingdom

Franchise with a currently airing season
Franchise with an upcoming season
Franchise whose status is unknown
Franchise no longer in production

Country/Region	Title	Television network	Winners	Presenters	Trainers
Algeria	The Winning Weight–الوزن الرابح	Samira TV	Season 1, 2019: Walid; Season 2, 2021–22: Rabah & Habiba; Season 3, 2025–26: TBA	Salima Souakri	Azzdine (season 1); Samir Benaissa (season 2–3)
Argentina	Cuestión de peso Matter of weight	Canal 13	Season 1, 2006: Maximiliano Oliva; Season 2, 2007: Amadeo; Season 3, 2008: Marcela; Season 4, 2010: Gabriel; Season 5, 2012: Gastón Villegas; Season 6, 2013: Micaela Belén Rutti; Season 7, 2017: TBA	Andrea Politti (1-4); Claribel Medina (5-6); Fabián Doman (7-); Lucía Rubio (7-)	Sergio Verón (1-)
Asia	The Biggest Loser Asia	Diva Universal	Season 1, 2009: David Gurnani; Season 2, 2010: Raj Devaraj	Sarimah Ibrahim (1); Marion Caunter (2)	Kristy Curtis; Dave Nuku
Arab world	الرابح الأكبر; Ar-Rabeh Al-Akabar; The Biggest Winner	MBC 1	Season 1, 2006: Abdullah Hammad; Season 2, 2007: Walead hemayed; Season 3, 2008: Mohammad Mazboudi; Season 4, 2009: Karim Abdullah	Carolina de Oliveira	Noor Khatab (3–4); Lina Rahma (3–4); Patci Saliba (2); Hani Abu Al-Naja (1–2); Zaina Habi (1)
Australia	The Biggest Loser	Network Ten	Season 1, 2006: Adro Sarnelli; Season 2, 2007: Chris Garling; Season 3, 2008: Sam Rouen; Season 4, 2009: Bob Herdsman; Season 5, 2010: Lisa Hose; Season 6, 2011: Emma Duncan; Season 7, 2012: Margie Cummins; Season 8, 2013: Katie & Robyn Dyke; Season 9, 2014: Craig Booby; Season 10, 2015: Daniel Jofre; Season 11, 2017: Brett Smith and Lynton Dalla Rosa	Ajay Rochester (1-4); Hayley Lewis (5-9); Fiona Falkiner (10–11)	Bob Harper (1-3); Jillian Michaels (1-3); Michelle Bridges (2-10); Shannan Ponton (2-); Steve Willis (4-10); Emma Hutton (4); Tiffiny Hall (6-7, 10); Libby Labet (11-)
Brazil	O Grande Perdedor; The Biggest Loser	SBT	Season 1, 2005: Andreia Dutra	Silvio Santos	Alexandre Viotti; Melina Pardo
Brazil	Quem Perde Ganha; Who Loses Wins	SBT	Season 2, 2007: Reginaldo de Souza	Lígia Mendes	Marcelo Piacentini; Patricia Beires
Brunei	The Biggest Loser	BNC	Season 1, 2010: Ahmad Ali Azizul; Season 2, 2011: Muhammad Zahin; Season 3, 2012: Nurul Hannah; Season 4, 2013: ?	Current; Sarah Rahman (3); Former; Stacy Sandra (1-2); Emma Pangiran Raden (1)	Rudy Salleh; Arifin Yahya; Cristine Phoebe; Ezuan Aziz; Juliana Mikael
Bulgaria	Живот на кантар Zhivot na kantar Life on the Scales	bTV	Season 1, 2025: Anna Sapundzhieva	Nansi Karaboycheva	Ivan Georgiev; Radoslava Todorova (1еp11–1ep28); Anita Markova (1еp1–1ep10)
China	The Biggest Loser: 超级减肥王 (2013); The Biggest Loser: Super Diet King; The Biggest Loser: 减出我人生 (2015- )	CCTV-2 (1); Jiangsu TV (2–)	Season 1, 2013: Zu Jiaze (祖嘉泽); Season 2, 2015-2016: Zhan Changrong (詹昌荣); Season 3, 2017: Shi Guibin; Season 4, 2018: ?	Current; Wang Jue (3); Will Liu (3-); Zu Jiaze (2-); Former; Lola Xie (1); Zhu Dan (2)	Current; Elaine Zhang (3-); Kai Zhang (3-); Gao Chilin (3-); Former; Xinyu Zheng (1-2); Will Liu (1-2)
Croatia	Život na vagi Life on the Scales	RTL Televizija	Season 1, 2017: Ivan Krolo; Season 2, 2017: Dorian Crnković; Season 3, 2018: Alen Abramović; Season 4, 2019: Robert Baković; Season 5, 2020: Matej Petrović; Season 6, 2022: Josip Čapo; Season 7, 2023: Mislav Šepić; Season 8, 2024: Alina Pantseyeva; Season 9, 2025: Dominik Šarić	Current; Antonija Blaće (9–); Former; Marijana Batinić (1-4, 6-8); Sanja Žuljević (5)	Current; Edin Mehmedović (4–); Mirna Čužić (7–); Former; Mario Mlinarić (1-3); Sanja Žuljević (1-3); Maja Ćustić (4-6)
Finland	Suurin pudottaja Biggest Loser	MTV3	Season 1, 2006: Hardy Dieter; Season 2, 2007: Virpi Heikkilä; Season 3, 2009: Kaisu Romppainen; Season 4, 2014: Teemu ?	Eeva Jaakonmaa; Sini Rantanen; Heidi Suomi; Lola Wallinkoski	Jani Sievinen (1-3); Eva Wahlström (1-3); Mikko Nummenmaa (4); Jenni Levävaara (4)
Finland	Suurin pudottaja Suomi	Nelonen	Season 1, 2019: Nina Mikkonen; Season 2, 2020: Aarni Mikkola; Season 3, 2022: Suvi Hakasalo	Anni Hautala (3); Riku Nieminen (1-2)	Janni Hussi (1-3); Jari Sorsa (3); Aki Manninen (1-2)
Germany	The Biggest Loser	ProSieben	Season 1, 2009: Enrico Proba	Katarina Witt (1)	Nele Sehrt (1); Wojtek Vetter (1)
Germany	The Biggest Loser	kabel eins	Season 2, 2010: Heino Herrmann; Season 3, 2011: Carlo Werner	Regina Halmich (2-3)	Andreas Büdeker (2-3); Silke Kayadelen (2-3)
Germany	The Biggest Loser	Sat.1	Season 4, 2012: Jack Handl; Season 5, 2013: Paride Loreto; Season 6, 2014: Marc Haile; Season 7, 2015: Stefan Pries; Season 8, 2016: Ali Shoshak; Season 9, 2017: Alexandra Gregus; Season 10, 2018: Saki; Season 11, 2019: Mario Pohl; Season 12, 2020: Daniel; Season 13, 2021: Ole; Season 14, 2022: Patrick; Season 15, 2023: Valentina; Season 16, 2024: Giulio Arancio	Christine Theiss (4-)	Bineta Coulibaly (4); Nunzio Esposito (4); Silke Kayadelen (5-6); Ramin Abtin (5-); Detlef Soost (7); Mareike Spaleck (8-11); Petra Arvela (12-)
Germany	The Biggest Loser Teens (Teenager-Version)	Sat.1	Season 1, 2014: Erfan Khorasani	Christine Theiss (1)	Silke Kayadelen (1); Ramin Abtin (1); Detlef D! Soost (1)
Germany	The Biggest Loser – Power Couples	Sat.1	Season 1, 2021: Lucas and Manni	Christine Theiss	Ramin Abtin; Hassina Bahlol-Schröer
Hungary	A Nagy Fogyás; A Great Loss	TV2	Season 1, 2007: István Ferencsik	Gabriella Jakupcsek	Norbert Schobert; Alexandra Béres
Iceland	Biggest Loser Ísland	SkjárEinn	Season 1, 2014: Jóhanna Elísa Engelhartsdóttir; Season 2, 2015: Stefán Sverrisson; Season 3, 2016: Agla Steinunn Bjarnþórudóttir; Season 4, 2017: Ólafía Kristín Norðfjörð	Inga Lind Karlsdóttir	Gurrý Torfadóttur; Evert Víglundsson
India	Biggest Loser Jeetega	Sahara One	Season 1, 2007: Sandeep Sachdev	Suniel Shetty	Deepika Mehta; Yusef Khan
Israel	לרדת בגדול; Laredet Begadol; Losing Big Time	Channel 10	Season 1, 2006: Limor Hazaz; Season 2, 2007: Tsvika Hilf; Season 3, 2008: Avi Koriat; Season 4, 2011: Karen Glasner	Tzipi Shavit; Michal Yannai	Nadav Meirson; Or-ly Hoffman Bar; Tse'ela Evroni; Barak Tzur
Jordan	Al-Semina السمينة	Jordan Channel One	Unknown	Abdallah Al-Khawaldeh	Mohamed Al-Shakhriti; Moath Al-Shawarbeh
Latvia	XXL	TV3 Latvia	Season 1, 2008: Karl Ventaskrasts	Zane Vaļicka	Raivis Vidzis; Aivars Vysotsky
Mexico	¿Cuánto quieres perder? How Much Do You Want to Lose?	Televisa	Season 1, 2008: Ignacio Mestas	Galilea Montijo	Unknown
Netherlands	De Afvallers; The Slimmers	SBS 6	Season 1, 2005: Daan & Irma Steenkamp with kids; Season 2, 2006: Bert & Grietje Bakker with kids; Season 3, 2006: Marco & Suzy Niels van Boxtel; Season 4, 2007: Mark Dakriet; Season 5, 2007: Nijmeijers Family; Season 6, 2011: Unknown	Marlayne Sahupala	Current; Yneke Vocking (1–); Imro Beuk (1–); Hein Vergeer (5–); Former; Barbara de Loor (3–4); Gianni Romme (3); Mo Achahboun (1–2); Lenny Versteegden (1); Jessica Gal (1); Sandra van de Kamp (2)
Netherlands	The Biggest Loser Holland	SBS 6	Season 1, 2013: Unknown	Marlayne Sahupala	Sandra van de Kamp; Arjuna Lakner
Norway	The Biggest Loser Norge	TVNorge	Season 2, 2015: Lars Dahlum Johansen; Season 3, 2016: Unknown	Henriette Bruusgaard	Tonje Jenssen; Adrian Paul
Paraguay	Cuestión de peso Matter of weight	Latele	Unknown	Karina Doldán (1-7)	Gigi Díaz (IFBB PRO) (6-7)
Peru	Dale con ganas Give It All You've Got	Univision	Season 1, 2012: Dieter Goldschmidt	Alfonso de Anda	Luis Alberto Aracena; Marcelo Crudele; Maria Simon; Oscar Luna
Philippines	The Biggest Loser Pinoy Edition	ABS-CBN	Season 1, 2011: Larry Martin; Season 2, 2014: Bryan Castillo	Sharon Cuneta (1); Derek Ramsay (1); Iza Calzado (2); Matteo Guidicelli (2); Robi Domingo (2)	Jim Saret (1-2); Chinggay Andrada (1); Toni Saret (2)
Poland	Co Masz Do Stracenia? What Do You Have To Lose?	TV Puls	Season 1, 2008: Jaroslaw	Małgorzata Ostrowska-Królikowska	Unknown
Portugal	Peso Pesado; Heavyweight	SIC	Season 1, 2011: Fábio Neves; Season 2, 2011: Marco André; Season 3, 2015: João Manuel	Current; Bárbara Guimarães (2–); Former; Júlia Pinheiro (1)	Current; Joana Mota(3); Mauro Policarpo(3); Pedro Correia(3); Former; Rui Barros (1-2); Conceição Gonçalves (2); Sara Freitas (1)
Puerto Rico	Transformación total Total Transformation	WAPA-TV	Season 1, 2010: Vivian V. Rodríguez; Season 2, 2011: Ángel "Joel" Díaz	Zuleyka Rivera	Unknown
Romania	Marele câștigător The Big Winner	Antena 1	Season 1, 2010: Grațian Stan	Daiana Anghel	Florin Uceanu; Cori Gramescu
Russia	Взвешенные люди / Взвешенные и счастливые люди (4); Vzveshenniye lyudi / Vzveshenniye i schastlivye lyudi (4); The Weighted People / The Weighted and Happy People	STS	Season 1, 2015: Pyotr Vasilyev; Season 2, 2016: Timur Bikbulatov; Season 3, 2017: Boris Baburov; Season 4, 2018: Anton Avduevsky	Yulia Kovalchuk (1-3); Anfisa Chekhova (4)	Irina Turchinskaya (1-3); Denis Semenihin (1-3); Sergey Parkhomenko (4); Natalia Lugovskikh (4); Sergey Badyuk (4)
Scandinavia	Biggest Loser	Kanal 5	Season 1, 2005: Rooy Rodriguez Ramirez	Martin Björk	Pauline Nordin
Serbia; Bosnia and Herzegovina	Najveći gubitnik The Biggest Loser	Nova S Nova BH	Season 1, 2023: Aleksandar Stevanović; Season 2, 2023: Dijana Konstantinović	Hristina Popović (Season 1); Danijela Buzurović (Season 2)	Stefan Nevistić; Maša Kuprešanin
Slovakia	Super Telo	STV	Season 1, 2006: Ján Mäsiar	Iveta Malachovská	Unknown
Slovakia	Najväčší víťaz The Biggest Winner	TV Markiza	Season 1, 2018: Július Lavo	Monika Zázrivcová	Janyho Landla; Soňa Sedláčková
Slovenia	Življenje na tehtnici Life On The Scales (4); The Biggest Loser Slovenija(1-3)	Planet TV	Season 1, 2017: Bojan Papež; Season 2, 2018: Klara Hrovat Vidmar; Season 3, 2019: Cristian Baranašič; Season 4, 2024: Anže Javšovec; Season 5, 2026: Current season	Current; Klemen Bučan (4–); Former; Špela Grošelj (1,3); Marko Potrč (2)	Current; Andrej Pavličević (5–); Valerija Slapnik (5–); Former; Nives Orešnik (4); Andrej Milutinovič (4); Nataša Gorenc (1-3); Jan Kovačič (1-3)
South Africa	The Biggest Loser South Africa	E.tv	Season 1, 2008: Sharon Haarhoff	Jasmyn Asvat	Unknown
Spain	La báscula The Scale	Canal Sur	Season 1, 2013: Unknown; Season 2, 2014: Unknown; Season 3, 2015: Rafael Cintado	Enrique Sánchez	Unknown
Spain	La báscula The Scale	Aragón TV	Season 1, 2015: Unknown	Luis Larrodera	Unknown
Sweden	Biggest Loser Sverige; Biggest Loser Sweden	TV4	Season 2, 2010: Karl Fredrik Jonsson; Season 3, 2012: Ralph Nicolaisen	Jessica Almenäs	Current; Sabina Dalfjäll (7-); Mikael Hollsten (5-); Former; Mårten Nylén (1-4); Tanja Djelevic (1, 3); Olga Rönnberg (2); Sabina Dufberg (4-6)
Sweden	Biggest Loser Sverige; Biggest Loser Sweden	Sjuan	Season 4, 2013: Simon Kachoa; Season 5, 2014: Hristos Adoniadis; Season 6, 2015: Robert Sander; Season 7, 2016: Sandra Wikström; Season 8, 2017: Michael Fridebäck; VIP 1, 2017: Anna Book; Season 9, 2018: Viktor Knutsson; VIP 2, 2018: Erik Hörstadius; Season 10, 2019: Malin Öström; Season 11, 2020: Mona Eriksson; Season 12, 2023: Filip Sehlstedt	Current Anna Brolin (6-) Former Kristin Kaspersen (3-5)	Current; Sabina Dalfjäll (7-); Mikael Hollsten (5-); Former; Mårten Nylén (1-4); Tanja Djelevic (1, 3); Olga Rönnberg (2); Sabina Dufberg (4-6)
Thailand	The Biggest Loser ลดน้ําหนักกระหึ่ม	Channel 7			
Turkey	Yeni Bir Hayat; New Life	Star TV	Season 1, 2012: Hakan Aktürk	Ebru Akel	Figen Yorgancıoğlu; Ufuk Sönmez
Ukraine	Зважені та щасливі Zvazheni ta schaslyvi Weighted and Happy	STB	Season 1, 2011: Mykola Voroshnov; Season 2, 2012: Alik Zakrevskyy; Season 3, 2013: Maryna Vdovenko; Season 4, 2014: Yuliya Fomina; Season 5, 2015: Oleksandr Repyanchuk; Season 6, 2016: Arkadiy Vasylyshyn; Season 7, 2017: Nataliya Tokaryeva and Oleksiy Dobryanskyy; Season 8, 2018: Bohdan and Oleh Buryak; Season 9, 2019: Nataliya Kyrylenko and Pavlo Nazarenko; Season 10, 2025: Viacheslav Hrabovyi; Season 11, 2026: Upcoming season	Current; Daniel Salem (10-); Former; Lyubava Greshnova (1); Olesya Zhurakivs'ka (2-5); Yana Solomko (6); Anita Lutsenko (7,9); Myroslava Ulyanina (8)	Current; Maryna Borzhems'ka-Uzelkova (6-); Oleksii Novikov (10-); Former; Anita Lutsenko (1-5); Igor Obukhovs'kyy (1-5); Vyacheslav Uzelkov† (4-8); Vasyl Virastyuk (8); Irakli Makatsaria (9)
United Kingdom & Ireland	The Biggest Loser	Living TV	Series 1, 2005: Aaron Howlett; Series 2, 2006: Jodie Prenger	Vicki Butler-Henderson	Angie Dowds; Mark Bailey
United Kingdom & Ireland	The Biggest Loser	ITV	Series 3, 2009: Kevin Sage; Series 4, 2011: Will Graham; Series 5, 2012: Kevin McLernon	Davina McCall (4–5); Kate Garraway (3)	Charlotte Ord (5); Rob Edmond (5); Richard Callender (3–5); Angie Dowds (3–4)
United States	The Biggest Loser	NBC (2004–2016); USA Network (2020)	Season 1, 2004: Ryan Benson; Season 2, 2005: Matt Hoover; Season 3, 2006: Erik Chopin; Season 4, 2007: Bill Germanakos; Season 5, 2008: Ali Vincent; Season 6, 2008: Michelle Aguilar; Season 7, 2009: Helen Phillips; Season 8, 2009: Danny Cahill; Season 9, 2010: Michael Ventrella; Season 10, 2010: Patrick House; Season 11, 2011: Olivia Ward; Season 12, 2011: John Rhode; Season 13, 2012: Jeremy Britt; Season 14, 2013: Danni Allen; Season 15, 2014: Rachel Frederickson; Season 16, 2015: Toma Dobrosavljevic; Season 17, 2016: Roberto Hernández; Season 18, 2020: Jim DiBattista	Current; Bob Harper (17-present); Former; Caroline Rhea (1–3); Alison Sweeney (4-16)	Former; Dolvett Quince (12-17); Jennifer Widerstrom (16-17); Jessie Pavelka (16); Anna Kournikova (12); Brett Hoebel (11); Cara Castronuova (11); Kim Lyons (3-4); Jillian Michaels (1-2, 4-11, 14-15); Bob Harper (1-16)

== Celebrity Splash! ==
Original name: Sterren Springen Op Zaterdag (Stars Jumping On Saturday)
Origin: Netherlands
Date started: 2012
Creator: Eyeworks
First network to broadcast: SBS6

Currently airing franchise
Franchise with an upcoming season
Franchise no longer in production

Country	Local title	Channel	Winners	Judges	Main presenters
Argentina	Celebrity Splash!	Telefe	Series 1, 2013: Nazareno Móttola	Pampita Ardohain; Maximiliano Guerra; Miguel Ángel Rodríguez; Mariana Montes	Marley Wiebe
Australia	Celebrity Splash!	Seven Network	Series 1, 2013: Andrew Symonds	Alisa Camplin; Greg Louganis; Matthew Mitcham	Larry Emdur; Kylie Gillies
Belgium	De Grote Sprong	vtm	Series 1, 2013: Tanja Dexters	Frans Van De Konijnenburg; Anna Bader; Fréderic Deburghgraeve	Kürt Rogiers; Evi Hanssen
Brazil	Saltibum	Rede Globo	Series 1, 2014: Rômulo Neto; Series 2, 2015: Priscila Fantin and Rodrigo Simas; Series 3, 2016: Maíra Charken and Bruno Chateaubriand	Eduardo Falcão (1-2); Roberto Biagioni (2); Hugo Parisi (1)	Luciano Huck
Chile	Salta si puedes	Chilevisión	Series 1, 2013: Katherine Orellana; Series 2, 2013: Cristián Menares	Sebastián Keitel; Francisca García-Huidobro; Yoel Gutiérrez; Sergio Freire	Rafael Araneda; Carolina de Moras
China	Celebrity Splash!	Zhejiang TV	Series 1, 2013: Xian Zi	Zhou Jihong; Li Na; Li Xiaopeng; Zhang Tielin	Huang Jianxiang; Yi Yi ("伊一" in Chinese)
Finland	Splash!	Nelonen	Series 1, 2013: Martina Aitolehti	Joona Puhakka; Janne Kataja; Rosa Meriläinen	Ellen Jokikunnas; Sebastian Rejman
France	Splash: Le Grand Plongeon	TF1	Series 1, 2013: Clément Lefert	Laure Manaudou; Taïg Khris; Muriel Hermine; Grégory Couratier	Estelle Denis; Gérard Vives; Julie Taton
Germany	Die Pool Champions - Promis unter Wasser	RTL	Series 1, 2013: Magdalena Brzeska	Verona Pooth; Franziska van Almsick; Christian Keller; Gerd Völker	Marco Schreyl; Nazan Eckes
Lebanon	Splash	LBCI	Series 1, 2013: Silvio Chiha; Series 2, 2014: ?	Elie Saad; Sandrine Atallah; Todor Spasov	Rola Bahnam; Aiman Kaissouni
Lithuania	Šuolis!	TV3	Series 1, 2014: Eglė Straleckaitė	Series 1, 2014: Ignas Barkauskas; Kęstutis Autukas; Guest judge	Series 1, 2014: Monika Vaičiulytė; Mindaugas Stasiulis
Mexico	El gran chapuzón	Canal de las Estrellas	Series 1, 2014: Maya Karunna	Yahel Castillo; Paola Espinosa; Tatiana Ortiz	Alan Tacher
Netherlands (original format)	Sterren Springen Op Zaterdag	SBS 6	Series 1, 2012: Liza Sips; Series 2, 2014: Jeffrey Wammes	Frans van de Konijnenburg (1–2); Inge de Bruijn (2); Daphne Jongejans (1); Quintis Ristie (1)	Gerard Joling (1–2); Kim-Lian van der Meij (2); Tess Milne (1)
Norway	Skal vi stupe	TV 2	Series 1, 2013: Mini Jakobsen and Roar Strand	?	Freddy dos Santos; Sarah Natasha Melbye
Poland	Celebrity Splash!	Polsat	Series 1, 2015: Andrzej Szczęsny	Otylia Jędrzejczak; Tomasz Zimoch; Danuta Stenka	Krzysztof Jankowski; Łukasz Grass
Portugal	Splash! Celebridades	SIC	Series 1, 2013: Ricardo Guedes; Series 2, 2013: Pedro Azevedo	Marco Horácio; Sílvia Rita; Simão Morgado; Ricardo Guedes (2)	Júlia Pinheiro; Rui Unas
Romania	Splash! Vedete la apă	Antena 1	Series 1, 2013: Piticu` Series 2, 2014: Cosmin Soare; Series 3, 2015: Vladmir Drăghia; Series 4, 2021: Cristian Pulhac; Series 5, 2022: Edmond Zannidache; Series 6, 2024: Larisa Iordache	Current; Clara Gherase (4–6); Iulia Albu (4–6); Nea Marin (4–6); Cosmin Nantanticu (5–6) Former; Cătălin Preda (1–3); Anda Adam (1); Daniel Buzdugan (1); Ozana Barabancea (2–3); Cosmin Seleși (2–3); Jean de la Craiova (4); Bogdan Ioniță (4)	Current; Răzvan Fodor (4–6); Ramona Olaru (4–6); Anamaria Ionescu (6) Former; Pepe (1–3); Roxana Ionescu (1–2); Roxana Vancea (1); Bianca Drăgușanu (2); Alina Pușcaș (3); Diana Munteanu (3, 5); Anna Lesko (4); Monica Bârladeanu (5)
Russia	Вышка; Vyshka	Channel One Russia	Series 1, 2013: Maksim Sharafutdinov	Stanislav Sadal'skiy; Emmanuel Vitorgan; Tatyana Ustinova; Elena Waicehovskaya; Dmitriy Dibrov; Andrey Urgant	Viktor Vasiliev; Katerina Shpica
South Korea	Splash	MBC	Canceled		Shin Dong-yup; Jun Hyun-moo
Spain	Splash! Famosos al agua	Antena 3	Series 1, 2013: Gervasio Deferr	Guti; Emilio Ratia; Santiago Segura; Anna Tarrés	Arturo Valls; Ainhoa Arbizu
Sweden	Kändishoppet	TV3	Series 1, 2013: Tobbe Blom; Series 2, 2013: Frank Andersson	?	Adam Alsing; Carin da Silva
Turkey	Ben Burdan Atlarım	Show TV	?	?	Chloe Loughnan
Ukraine	Вишка; Vyshka	1+1	Series 1, 2013: Olha Kharlan	Volodymyr Zelenskyy; Tamara Tokmachova; Dmitry Sautin	Solomiya Vitvitska; Andriy Domanskyi
United Kingdom	Splash!	ITV	Series 1, 2013: Eddie "The Eagle" Edwards; Series 2, 2014: Perri Kiely	Andy Banks; Jo Brand; Leon Taylor	Gabby Logan; Vernon Kay
United States	Splash	ABC	Series 1, 2013: Rory Bushfield	David Boudia; Steve Foley	Joey Lawrence; Charissa Thompson

== Clash of the Choirs ==
Original name: Clash of the Choirs
Origin: United States
Date started: December 17, 2007
Creator: Friday TV
First network to broadcast: NBC
First country to adapt: Sweden
Country with the most seasons: Sweden

Country	Title	Host	Network	First Aired
Australia	Battle of the Choirs	David Koch	Seven Network	May 2008
Catalonia	Oh Happy Day	Eduard Farelo	TV3	September 21, 2013
China	Mengxiang Hechangtuan 梦想合唱团	Sa Beining 撒贝宁	CCTV-1	2011
Denmark	AllStars	Lisbeth Østergaard	TV2	2008
Estonia	Laululahing	Tarmo Leinatamm	etv	2008
Finland	Kuorosota	Kristiina Komulainen	Nelonen	2009
France	La Bataille des Chorales	Benjamin Castaldi	TF1	2009
Galicia	Oh Happy Day	Rodrigo Vázquez	TVG	2015
Jordan	Harb Al-Karasi حرب الكراسي	Khaled Nour	Channel 1 Jordan	2020
Latvia	Koru Kari	Lauris Reiniks (2008; 2009; 2013) Dainis Grūbe (2025)	TV3	2008, 2009, 2013, 2025
Lithuania	Chorų karai	Vytautas Šapranauskas & Jurgita Jurkutė	TV3	January 16, 2010
Netherlands	Korenslag	Henny Huisman (2007;2008/09); Mark Dik (2010/11)	NPO 1 (2007); NPO 2 (08/09, 10/11)	May 24, 2007
Norway	Det store korslaget	Øyvind Mund	TV2	2009
Poland	Bitwa na głosy	Hubert Urbański & Piotr Kędzierski	TVP 2	2011
Russia	Битва хopов	Valery Meladze	Rossiya 1	September 16, 2012
South Africa	Clash of the Choirs South Africa	Bonang Matheba	DStv	January 27, 2013
Spain	La Batalla de los Coros	Josep Lobató	Cuatro	2008
Sweden	Körslaget	Gry Forssell	TV4	March 29, 2008
Switzerland	Kampf der Chöre	Sven Epiney	SF 1	2010
Turkey	Korolar Çarpışıyor	Behzat Uighur	Show TV	2009
Ukraine	Битва хорів	Yuriy Horbunov	1+1	November 10, 2013
Vietnam	Hợp ca tranh tài	Nguyên Khang	VTV3	February 24, 2012

== Dancing with the Stars ==
Original name: Strictly Come Dancing
Origin: United Kingdom
Date started: May 15, 2004
Creator: Fenia Vardanis, Richard Hopkins, Karen Smith
First network to broadcast: BBC One
First country to adapt: Australia Currently airing
Upcoming season
Status unknown
No longer airing

Region/country	Local title	Network	Winners (celebrity and professional)	Judges	Presenters
Albania; Kosovo		Vizion Plus (1–7); Top Channel (8–9)	Season 1, 2010: Oni Pustina & Linda Poda; Season 2, 2011: Enver Petrovci & Lori Bala; Season 3, 2012: Elvana Gjata & Gerdi Vaso; Season 4, 2013–14: Lori Hoxha & Dion Gjinika; Season 5, 2014–15: Tuna & Simone Pigliacelli; Season 6, 2015: Dorina Mema & Besi; Season 7, 2018: Soni Malaj & Dion Gjinika; Season 8, 2022–23: Sara Hoxha & Luixhino Hala; Season 9, 2023: Enxhi Nasufi & Silvester Shuta	Arian Çani (1–2); Iva Tiço (1–4); Milaim Zeka (5); Alfred Kaçinari (3–7); Ema Andrea (4–7); Julian Deda (7); Armand Peza (8); Dalina Buzi (8); Kledi Kadiu (8); Valbona Selimllari (8–9); Ilir Shaqiri (1–7, 9); Lori Bala (9); Olta Gixhari (9)	Alketa Vejsiu (1); Genti Zotaj (1); Ermal Mamaqi (2–3); Armina Mevlani (4); Jonida Maliqi (4); Drini Zeqo (5); Amarda Toska (2–3, 5–6); Mateo Cela (6); Rudi Hizmo (6–7); Almeda Abazi (7); Bora Zemani (8–9); Eno Popi (8–9)
Arab World	Dancing With Stars Bel Araby	Abu Dhabi TV (1); SBC (2) beIN One (3)	Season 1, 2020: Souhila Mâallem & Hamed Sami; Season 2, 2023: Unknown Season 3, 2024: TBA	Wassim Maghnieh; Abdallah Mahmoud; Hassan Yassin; Ahmad Khalid; Waleed Zaki; Mazen Kiwan	Mansour Hamdan; Abdelaziz Saleh
Argentina	Bailando por un Sueño	El Trece	Season 1, Spring 2006: Carmen Barbieri & Christian Ponce; Season 2, Summer 2006: Florencia de la V & Manuel Rodríguez; Season 3, Fall 2006: Carla Conte & Guillermo Conforte; Season 4, 2007: Celina Rucci & Matías Sayago; Season 5, 2008: Carolina Ardohain & Nicolás Armengol; Season 6, 2010: Fabio Moli & Mariana Conci; Season 7, 2011: Hernán Piquín & Noelia Pompa; Season 8, 2012: Hernán Piquín & Noelia Pompa; Season 9, 2014: Anita Martínez & Bicho Gómez; Season 10, 2015: Federico Bal & Laurita Fernández; Season 11, 2016: Pedro Alfonso & Florencia Vigna; Season 12, 2017: Florencia Vigna & Gonzalo Gerber; Season 13, 2018: Julián Serrano & Sofía Morandi; Season 14, 2019: Nicolás Occhiato & Florencia Jazmín Peña; Season 15, 2021: Noelia Marzol & Jonathan Lazarte; Season 16, 2023: Fiorella Acosta & Sandro Leone	Current; Ángel de Brito (10–); Carolina Ardohain (10–12, 14–); Jimena Barón (15–); Hernán Piquín (15–); Former; Marcelo Polino (7–14); Florencia Peña (13–14); Laura Fernández (13); Moria Casán (3–12); Soledad Silveyra (9–11); Nacha Guevara (9–10); Carmen Barbieri (2, 5–8); Aníbal Pachano (6–8); Flavio Mendoza (7–8); Antonio Gasalla (8); Graciela Alfano (4, 6–7); Ricardo Fort (6); Reina Reech (1, 3, 6); Gerardo Sofovich (3–5); Jorge Lafauci (1–5); Laura Fidalgo (1–2); Zulma Faiad (1–2)	Marcelo Tinelli
Argentina	Bailando Kids	El Trece	Season 1, 2009: Pedro Maurizi & Candela Rodríguez	Laura Fidalgo; Carmen Barbieri; Reina Reech; Miguel Ángel Cherutti	Marcelo Tinelli; José María Listorti
Armenia	Parahandes (Պարահանդես)	Shant TV	Season 1, 2011: Emma Manukyan & Armen; Season 2, 2011–2012: Janna Hovakimyan & Petros; Season 3, 2013: Sandukht Matevosyan & Harut; Season 4, 2014: Gevorg Harutyunyan & Shushan; Season 5, 2014–2015:	Rudolf Kharatyan (1); Levon Vermishyan (1); Hrach Badalyan (2); Kristine Hovakimyan (3–4); Varduhi Aleksanyan (1–5); Gagik Karapetyan (1–5); Gevorg Markosyan (2–3, 5); Sergey Danielyan (3–5)	
Australia	Dancing with the Stars	Current; Seven Network (1–15, 18–); Former; Network 10 (16–17)	Season 1, 2004: Bec Cartwright & Michael Miziner; Season 2, 2005: Tom Williams & Kym Johnson; Season 3, 2005: Ada Nicodemou & Aric Yegudkin; Season 4, 2006: Grant Denyer & Amanda Garner; Season 5, 2006: Anthony Koutoufides & Natalie Lowe; Season 6, 2007: Kate Ceberano & John-Paul Collins; Season 7, 2007: Bridie Carter & Craig Monley; Season 8, 2008: Luke Jacobz & Luda Kroiter; Season 9, 2009: Adam Brand & Jade Hatcher; Season 10, 2010: Rob Palmer & Alana Patience; Season 11, 2011: Manu Feildel & Alana Patience; Season 12, 2012: Johnny Ruffo & Luda Kroitor; Season 13, 2013: Cosentino & Jessica Raffa; Season 14, 2014: David Rodan & Melanie Hooper; Season 15, 2015: Emma Freedman & Aric Yegudkin; Season 16, 2019: Samuel Johnson & Jorja Freeman; Season 17, 2020: Celia Pacquola & Jarryd Byrne; Season 18, 2021: Luke Jacobz & Jorja Freeman; Season 19, 2022: Grant Denyer & Lily Cornish; Season 20, 2023: Phil Burton & Ash-Leigh Hunter; Season 21, 2024: Lisa McCune & Ian Waite; Season 22, 2025: Kyle Shilling & Lily Cornish	Current; Helen Richey (1–15, 18–19, 21–); Mark Wilson (1–10, 18–); Craig Revel Horwood (16–17, 20–); Sharna Burgess (16–17, 20–); Former; Joshua Horner (11–12); Adam Garcia (13–14); Kym Johnson (13–15); Tristan MacManus (16–17); Paul Mercurio (1–7, 18–19); Todd McKenney (1–15, 18–20)	Current; Sonia Kruger (1–11, 18–); Chris Brown (21–); Former; Mel B (12); Daniel MacPherson (8–14); Edwina Bartholomew (13–15); Shane Bourne(15); Grant Denyer (16–17); Amanda Keller (16–17); Daryl Somers (1–7, 18–20)
Austria	Dancing Stars	ORF1	Season 1, 2005: Marika Lichter & Andy Kainz; Season 2, 2006: Manuel Ortega & Kelly Kainz; Season 3, 2007: Klaus Eberhartinger & Kelly Kainz; Season 4, 2008: Dorian Steidl & Nicole Kuntner; Season 5, 2009: Claudia Reiterer & Andy Kainz; Season 6, 2011: Astrid Wirtenberger & Balazs Ekker; Season 7, 2012: Petra Frey & Vadim Garbuzov; Season 8, 2013: Rainer Schönfelder & Manuela Stöckl; Season 9, 2014: Roxanne Rapp & Vadim Garbuzov; Season 10, 2016: Verena Scheitz & Florian Gschaider; Season 11, 2017: Martin Ferdiny & Maria Santner; Season 12, 2019: Elisabeth Görgl & Thomas Kraml; Season 13, 2020: Michaela Kirchgasser & Vadim Garbuzov; Season 14, 2021: Caroline Athanasiadis & Danilo Campisi; Season 15, 2023: Missy May & Dimitar Stefanin; Season 16, 2025: Aaron Karl & Kateryna Mizera	Current; Balázs Ekker (7–); Maria Angelini-Santner (14–); Former; Dagmar Koller (1); Harald Serafin (2); Guggi Löwinger (3); Alfons Haider (4); Klaus Eberhartinger (5); Thomas Schäfer-Elmayer (1–10); Hannes Nedbal (1–10); Nicole Hansen (1–13); Dirk Heidemann (11–13); Karina Sarkissova (11–14)	Current; Mirjam Weichselbraun (1–12, 14–); Andi Knoll (15–); Former; Alfons Haider (1–3, 5); Klaus Eberhartinger (4, 6–13); Kristina Inhof (13); Norbert Oberhauser (14)
Belgium	Sterren op de Dansvloer	VTM	Season 1, 2006: Dina Tersago & Wim Gevaert; Season 2, 2007: Pieter Loridon & Daisy Croes; Season 3, 2008: Antony Arandia & Leila Akcelik; Season 4, 2009: Louis Talpe & Leila Akcelik; Season 5, 2012: Kevin van der Perren & Charissa van Dipte	Davy Brocatus (Seasons 1–5); Ronny Daelemans (Seasons 1–5); Dina Tersago (Season 5); Euvgenia Parakhina (Season 5); Anouchka Balsing (Seasons 1–4); Jan Geerts (Seasons 1–4)	Jacques Vermeire (Seasons 1–4); Francesca Vanthielen (Seasons 1–5); Kürt Rogiers (Season 5)
Belgium	Dancing with the Stars	Play4	Season 1, 2018: James Cooke & Björk Gunnarsdóttir; Season 2, 2019: Julie Vermeire & Pasquale La Rocca; Season 3, 2021: Nina Derwael & Simone Arena	Joanna Leunis; Jan Kooijman Michel Froget (Season 1); Leah Thys (Season 1); Sam Louwyck (Season 2); Davy Brocatus (Season 2); Wim Vanlessen (Season 3); Joffrey Anane (Season 3)	Gert Verhulst Jani Kazaltzis (Season 1); Katrin Kerkhofs (Season 2–3)
Belgium	Dancing with the Stars	VTM	Season 1, 2025: Upcoming Season		Current Jonas Van Geel; Peter Van Den Begin
Brazil	Dança dos Famosos (UK format)	TV Globo	Season 1, 2005: Karina Bacchi & Fabiano Vivas; Season 2, 2006: Juliana Didone & Leandro Azevedo; Season 3, 2006: Robson Caetano & Ivonete Liberatto; Season 4, 2007: Rodrigo Hilbert & Priscila Amaral; Season 5, 2008: Christiane Torloni & Alvaro Reis; Season 6, 2009: Paola Oliveira & Atila Amaral; Season 7, 2010: Fernanda Souza & Alexandre Porcel; Season 8, 2011: Miguel Roncato & Ana Flavia Simoes; Season 9, 2012: Rodrigo Simas & Raquel Guarini; Season 10, 2013: Carol Castro & Leandro Azevedo; Season 11, 2014: Marcello Melo Jr. & Raquel Guarini; Season 12, 2015: Viviane Araújo & Marcelo Granjeiro; Season 13, 2016: Felipe Simas & Carol Agnelo; Season 14, 2017: Maria Joana & Reginaldo Sama; Season 15, 2018: Léo Jaime & Larissa Parison; Season 16, 2019: Kaysar Dadour & Mayara Araújo; Season 17, 2020: Lucy Ramos & Reginaldo Sama; Season 18, 2021: Paola Oliveira & Leandro Azevedo; Season 19, 2022: Vitória Strada & Wagner Santos; Season 20, 2023: Priscila Fantin & Rolon Hô; Season 21, 2024: Tati Machado & Diego Maia; Season 22, 2025 Silvero Pereira & Thais Souza	Current; Ana Botafogo; Carlinhos de Jesus; Zebrina; Guest judges Former; Five per week (no fixed jury)	Current; Luciano Huck (Season 19); Former; Fausto Silva (Seasons 1–18); Tiago Leifert (Season 18; weeks 5–16)
Brazil	Dancinha dos Famosos (formerly Dança das Crianças) (Kids version)	TV Globo	Season 1, 2007: João Vitor Silva & Juliane Dias; Season 2, 2008: Eduardo Melo & Gabriela Bogo; Season 3, 2009: Nauhana Costa & Thaian Marques; Season 4, 2015: Mel Maia & Wesley Monteiro; Season 5, 2017: Xande Valois & Duda Almeida	Three per week (no fixed jury)	Fausto Silva
Brazil	Dancing Brasil (U.S. format)	RecordTV	Season 1, 2017: Maytê Piragibe & Paulo Victor Souza; Season 2, 2017: Yudi Tamashiro & Barbara Guerra; Season 3, 2018: Geovanna Tominaga & Lucas Teodoro; Season 4, 2018: Pérola Faria & Fernando Perrotti; Season 5, 2019: D'Black & Carol Dias	Jaime Arôxa; Fernanda Chammy; Paulo Goulart Filho	Xuxa Meneghel; Junno Andrade (Season 4–present); Sérgio Marone (Season 1–2); Leandro Lima (Season 3)
Brazil	Dancing Brasil Júnior (Kids version)	RecordTV	Season 1, 2018: Leonardo Oliveira & Yasmim Nascimento	Jaime Arôxa; Fernanda Chammy; Paulo Goulart Filho	Xuxa Meneghel; Jean Paulo Campos
Bulgaria	Dancing Stars (US format)	bTV (Season 1–2, 5); NOVA (Season 3–4)	Season 1, 2008: Orlin Pavlov & Yana Akimova; Season 2, 2009: Bianka Panova & Svetoslav Vasilev; Season 3, 2013: Angel Kovachev & Dorina Stoyanova; Season 4, 2014: Albena Denkova & Kaloyan Ivanov; Season 5, 2024: Nedelya Shtonova & Atanas Mesetchkov	Galena Velikova (Seasons 1, 3–5); Vladimir Bozhilov (Season 1); Neshka Robeva (Season 1); Iliana Raeva (Seasons 2–5); Maria Gigova (Season 2); Pambous Agapiu (Season 2); Vera Marinova (Season 2); Alfredo Torres (Seasons 3–4); Kalin Sarmenov (Season 3); Hristo Mutafchiev (Season 4); Frantsiska Yordanova - Papkala (Season 5); Tomash Papkala (Season 5)	Radost Draganova (Season 1); Todor Kolev (Season 1); Elena Petrova (Season 2); Dimitar Pavlov (Season 2); Aleksandra Sarchadjieva (Seasons 3–4); Krasimir Rankov (Season 3); Nikol Stankulova (Season 3); Kalin Sarmenov (Season 4); Magi Zhelyaskova (Season 4); Aleksandra Raeva (Season 5); Krasimir Radkov (Season 5); Stanislava Gancheva (Season 5)
Bulgaria	VIP Dance (UK format)	NOVA	Season 1, 2009: Raina, Fahradin Fahradinov, Sashka Dimitrova and Svetlin Dimitrov	Neshka Robeva; Galena Velikova; Orlin Pavlov; Ivaylo Manolov	Ivan Hristov; Andrey Arnaudov
Chile	El Baile en TVN	TVN	Season 1, 2006: Juvenal Olmos & Claudia Miranda; Season 2, Spring 2007: Cristián Arriagada & Paz Bustos; Season 3, Fall 2007: Francisco Reyes Morandé & Irene Bustamante; Season 4, 2008: Fernando Godoy & Paz Bustos	Claudia Miranda (Season 2,4); Georgette Farías (Seasons 3–4); Jose Luis Tejo (Seasons 3–4); Sergio Valero (Seasons 1–4); Sara Nieto (Seasons 1–2); Mey Santamaría (Seasons 1); William Geisse (Seasons 1–3)	Rafael Araneda (Seasons 1–4); Karen Doggenweiler (Seasons 1–4)
China	舞动奇迹; Strictly Come Dancing China (1–3) 與星共舞; Dancing with the Stars (4)	Hunan TV & TVB (Season 1–2); Hunan TV (Season 3); Dragon TV (Season 4)	Season 1, 2007: Li Yuchun; Season 2, 2008: Su Xin & Jason Zhang; Season 3, 2011: Jin Chen & Li Nuoyi; Season 4, 2014–2015:	Yang yang (Seasons 1–3); Zhou Zhikun (Seasons 1–3); Sheng Peiyi (Seasons 1–3)	Yang Lele (Season 3); He Jiong (Season 3)
Colombia	Bailando por un Sueño; Web Oficial	RCN	Season 1, 2006: Maria Cecilia Sánchez & Jose Andulfo Leal Garay; Season 2, 2006: Carolina Cruz & Wilber González; Season 3, 2006: Valentina Rendón & Felipe Hurtado	Nerú Martínez; Thereusse Leleux; Carlos Muñoz; Rosanna Lignarolo	Paola Turbay; Julián Román
Colombia	Bailando con las Estrellas	RCN	Season 1, 2016: Debi Nova	Fernando Montaño; Niina Shablinskaja; Alberto "Beto" Pérez	Patrick Delmas; Taliana Vargas
Costa Rica	Dancing With The Stars	Teletica	Season 1, 2014: Alex Costa & Alhanna Morales; Season 2, 2015: Renzo Rímolo & Yessenia Reyes; Season 3, 2016: Daniel Vargas & Lucía Jiménez; Season 4, 2017: Víctor Carvajal & Diana de la O Season 5, 2018: Johanna Solano & Kevin Vera; Season 6, 2019: Sofía Chaverri & Javier Acuña; Season 7, 2022: Lorna Cepeda & Michael Rubí	David Martínez; Flor Urbina (Seasons 1–6); César Meléndez (Seasons 1–2); Alex Costa (Seasons 3–present); Silvia Baltodano (Seasons 7–present)	Randall Vargas; Shirley Álvarez; Boris Sosa (Season 2); Mauricio Hoffmann (Season 3); Bismarck Méndez (Season 4–5) Natalia Carvajal (Season 6); María Rodríguez (Season 7)
Croatia	Ples sa zvijezdama	HRT1 (2006–13); Nova TV (2019, 2022–2023)	Season 1, 2006: Zrinka Cvitešić & Nicolas Quesnoit; Season 2, 2007: Luka Nižetić & Mirjana Žutić; Season 3, 2008: Mario Valentić & Ana Herceg; Season 4, 2009: Franka Batelić & Ištvan Varga; Season 5, 2010: Nera Stipičević & Damir Horvatinčić; Season 6, 2011: Marko Tolja & Ana Herceg; Season 7, 2012: Barbara Radulović & Robert Schubert; Season 8, 2013: Mislav Čavajda & Petra Jeričević; Season 9, 2019: Slavko Sobin & Gabriela Pilić; Season 10, 2022: Pedro Soltz & Valentina Walme; Season 11, 2023: Marco Cuccurin & Paula Tonković	Dinko Bogdanić(Seasons 1–9); Milka Babović (Seasons 1–8); Elio Bašan (Seasons 1–8); Davor Bilman (Seasons 1–8); Tamara Despot (Season 9); Nicolas Quesnoit (Season 9); Almira Osmanović (Season 9); Marko Ciboci (Season 10–11); Larisa Lipovec Navojec (Season 10–11); Igor Barberić (Season 10–11); Franka Batelić (Season 10–11)	Duško Čurlić (Seasons 1–8); Barbara Kolar (Season 1–8); Mia Kovačić (Season 9); Janko Popović Volarić (Season 9); Igor Mešin (Season 10–11); Maja Šuput (Season 10); Tamara Loos (Season 11)
Czech Republic	StarDance	Czech Television	Season 1, 2006: Roman Vojtek & Kristýna Coufalová; Season 2, 2007: Aleš Valenta & Iva Langerová; Season 3, 2008: Dana Batulková & Jan Onder; Season 4, 2010: Pavel Kříž & Alice Stodůlková; Season 5, 2012: Kateřina Baďurová & Jan Onder; Season 6, 2013: Anna Polívková & Michal Kurtiš; Season 7, 2015: Marie Doležalová & Marek Zelinka; Season 8, 2016: Zdeněk Piškula & Veronika Lálová; Season 9, 2018: Jiří Dvořák & Lenka Nora Návorková; Season 10, 2019: Veronika Khek Kubařová & Dominik Vodička; Season 11, 2021: Jan Cina & Adriana Mašková; Season 12, 2023: Darija Pavlovičová & Dominik Vodička; Season 13, 2024: Oskar Hes & Kateřina Bartuněk Hrstková	Current; Tatiana Drexler (Seasons 2–present); Richard Genzer (Seasons 10–present); Jan Tománek (Seasons 10–11, 13–present); Former; Zdeněk Chlopčík (Seasons 1–12); Václav Kuneš (Season 9); Radek Balaš (Seasons 6–9); Jan Révai (Seasons 5–8); Eva Bartuňková (Seasons 1, 5); Petra Tirpák Kostovčíková (Season 4); Petr Zuska (Season 4); Leona Kvasnicová (Season 3); Jaroslav Kuneš (Season 3); Mahulena Bočanová (Season 2); Richard Hes (Season 2); Michael Kocáb (Season 1); Vlastimil Harapes (Season 1)	Tereza Kostková (Seasons 1–present); Marek Eben (Seasons 1–present)
Denmark	Vild med dans	TV 2	Season 1, 2005: Mia Lyhne & Thomas Evers Poulsen; Season 2, 2005: David Owe & Vickie Jo Ringgaard; Season 3, 2006: Christina Roslyng & Steen Lund; Season 4, 2007: Robert Hansen & Marianne Eihilt; Season 5, 2008: Joachim B. Olsen & Marianne Eihilt; Season 6, 2009: Casper Elgaard & Vickie Jo Ringgaard; Season 7, 2010: Cecilie Hother & Mads Vad; Season 8, 2011: Sophie Fjellvang-Sølling & Silas Holst; Season 9, 2012: Joakim Ingversen & Claudia Rex; Season 10, 2013: Mie Skov & Mads Vad; Season 11, 2014: Sara Maria Franch Mærkedahl & Silas Holst; Season 12, 2015: Ena Spottag & Thomas Evers Poulsen; Season 13, 2016: Sarah Mahfoud & Morten Kjeldgaard; Season 14, 2017: Sofie Lassen-Kahlke & Michael Olesen; Season 15, 2018: Simon Stenspil & Asta Bjórk Ivarsdottir; Season 16, 2019: Jakob Fauerby & Silas Holst; Season 17, 2020: Merete Mærkedahl & Thomas Evers Poulsen; Season 18, 2021: Jimilian & Asta Björk Ivarsdottir; Season 19, 2022: Caspar Phillipson & Malene Østergaard; Season 20, 2023: Kasper Fisker & Karina Frimodt; Season 21, 2024: Anna Munch & Eugen Miu; Season 22, 2025: Jasmind Lind & Michael Olesen	Marianne Eihilt (Seasons 16–22); Lene James Mikkelsen (Seasons 21–22); Sonny Fredie Pedersen (Seasons 19–22); Anne Laxholm (Seasons 1–20); Jens Werner (Seasons 1–19); Britt Bendixen (Seasons 1–18); Kim Dahl (Seasons 1); Thomas Evers Poulsen (Seasons 2); Allan Tornsberg (Seasons 3–7); Nikolaj Hübbe (Seasons 8–20)	Cilia Trappaud (Seasons 21–22); Martin Johannes Larsen (Seasons 19–22); Peter Hansen (Seasons 1–2); Andrea Elisabeth Rudolph (Seasons 1–2 & Seasons 4–6); Claus Elming (Seasons 3–14); Sarah Grünewald (Seasons 10–20); Christine Lorentzen (Seasons 3); Christiane Schaumburg-Müller (Seasons 7–9, 15–18)
Estonia	Tantsud tähtedega	Kanal 2 (2006–2011); TV3 (2022–)	Season 1, 2006: Mikk Saar & Olga Kosmina; Season 2, 2007: Koit Toome & Kertuu Tänav; Season 3, 2008: Argo Ader & Helena Liiv; Season 4, 2010: Liina Vahter & Mairold Millert; Season 5, 2011: Jan Uuspõld & Aleksandra Žeregelja; Season 6, 2022: Ülle Lichtfeldt & Marko Mehine	Current; Jüri Nael (Seasons 1–2, 4–); Helen Klandorf-Sadam (Season 6–); Tanja Mihhailova-Saar (Season 6–); Martin Parmas (Season 6–); Former; Merle Klandorf (Seasons 1–5); Ants Tael (Seasons 1–4); Kaie Kõrb (Seasons 1–3); Riina Suhhotskaja (Season 3); Märt Agu (Season 3)	Current; Jüri Pootsmann (Season 6–); Eda-Ines Etti (Season 6–); Former; Mart Sander (Seasons 1–5); Liina Randpere (Season 5); Kristiina Heinmets-Aigro (Season 1); Merle Liivak (Season 2); Gerli Padar (Season 3); Kaisa Oja (Season 4)
Finland	Tanssii tähtien kanssa	MTV3	Season 1, 2006: Tomi Metsäketo & Sanna Hirvaskari; Season 2, 2007: Mariko Pajalahti & Aleksi Seppänen; Season 3, 2008: Maria Lund & Mikko Ahti; Season 4, 2009: Satu Tuomisto & Janne Talasma; Season 5, 2010: Antti Tuisku & Anna-Liisa Bergström; Season 6, 2011: Viivi Pumpanen & Matti Puro; Season 7, 2012: Krisse Salminen & Matti Puro; Season 8, 2013: Raakel Lignell & Jani Rasimus; Season 9, 2014: Pete Parkkonen & Katri Mäkinen; Season 10, 2017: Anna-Maija Tuokko & Matti Puro; Season 11, 2018: Edis Tatli & Katri Mäkinen; Season 12, 2019: Christoffer Strandberg & Jutta Helenius; Season 13, 2020: Virpi Sarasvuo & Sami Helenius; Season 14, 2021: Ernest Lawson & Anniina Koivuniemi; Season 15, 2022: Benjamin & Saana Akiola; Season 16, 2023: Pernilla Böckerman & Anssi Heikkilä; Season 17, 2024: Linnea Leino & Anssi Heikkilä; Season 18, 2025: Johannes Holopainen & Katri Riihilahti	Current; Jukka Haapalainen (Seasons 1–present); Jorma Uotinen (Seasons 1–present); Helena Ahti-Hallberg (Seasons 3–8, 10–present) Former; Merja Satulehto (Seasons 1–2); Mikko Rasila (Seasons 1–2); Johanna Rusanen (Season 3); Susanna Rahkamo (Season 4); Jone Nikula (Season 5); Anna Abreu (Season 6); Riku Nieminen (Season 7); Jenni Paaskysaari (Season 8); Krisse Salminen (Season 9); Kiira Korpi (Seasons 10)	Current; Vappu Pimiä (Seasons 4–6 & 8–present); Ernest Lawson (Seasons 15-present); Former; Marco Bjurström (Seasons 1–4); Vanessa Kurri (Seasons 3); Ella Kanninen (Seasons 1–2 & Season 7); Mikko Leppilampi (Seasons 5–14)
France	Danse avec les stars	TF1	Season 1, Early 2011: Matt Pokora & Katrina Patchett; Season 2, Fall 2011: Shy'm & Maxime Dereymez; Season 3, 2012: Emmanuel Moire & Fauve Hautot; Christmas Special, 2012: Amel Bent & Christophe Licata; Season 4, 2013: Alizée & Gregoire Lyonnet; Season 5, 2014: Rayane Bensetti & Denitsa Ikonomova; Season 6, 2015: Loïc Nottet & Denitsa Ikonomova; Season 7, 2016: Laurent Maistret & Denitsa Ikonomova; Season 8, 2017: Agustín Galiana & Candice Pascal; Season 9, 2018: Clément Rémiens & Denitsa Ikonomova; Season 10, 2019: Sami El Gueddari & Fauve Hautot; Season 11, 2021: Tayc & Fauve Hautot; Season 12, 2022: Billy Crawford & Fauve Hautot; Season 13, 2024: Natasha St-Pier & Anthony Colette; Season 14, 2025: Lénie Vacher & Jordan Mouillerac; Season 15, 2026⁚ Samuel Bambi & Ana Riera	Current; Chris Marques (Seasons 1–present); Jean-Marc Généreux (Seasons 1–10, 13-present); Fauve Hautot (Seasons 6–8, 13-present); Mel Charlot (Season 13-present) Former; Alessandra Martines (Seasons 1–2); Matt Pokora (Season 5); Marie-Claude Pietragalla (Seasons 3–7); Nico Archambault (Season 8); Patrick Dupond (Seasons 9–10); Shy'm (Seasons 3–4; 9–10); Jean Paul Gaultier (Season 11); Denitsa Ikonomova (Season 11); François Alu (Seasons 11-12); Bilal Hassani (Season 12); Marie-Agnès Gillot (Season 12)	Current; Camille Combal (Seasons 9–present); Former; Vincent Cerutti (Seasons 1–5); Laurent Ournac (Seasons 6–7); Sandrine Quétier (Seasons 1–8); Karine Ferri (Seasons 9–11)
France	Danse avec les stars d'internet	TF1+ Twitch	Season 1, 2024: Domingo & Inès Vandamme Season 2, 2025 : Upcoming Season	Chris Marques; Jean-Marc Généreux; Fauve Hautot; Mel Charlot	Michou; Doigby
Georgia	ცეკვავენ ვარსკვლავები Tsekvaven Varskvlavebi	Imedi TV	Season 1, 2012: Samori Balde & Lika Labadze; Season 2, 2012: Ruska Mayashvili & Oto Poladashvili; Season 3, 2013: Keti Khatiashvili & Giorgi Barbakadze; Season 4, 2014: Mariam Kublashvili & Victor Burchuladze; Season 5, 2014: Zura Manjavidze & Mzia Orvelashvili; Season 6, 2016: Stanislav Bondarenko & Nike Keshelava; Season 7, 2017: Giorgi Bakhutashvili & Juliana Bargnari; Season 8, 2018: Amiko Chokharadze & Juliana Bargnari; Season 9, 2020: Anka Vasadze & Oto Poladashvili; Season 10, 2021: Salome Pazhava & Rati Gachechiladze; Season 11, 2022–23: Babi Kirkitadze & Erekle Girgvliani	Current; Gocha Chertkoev (Seasons 1–present); Sofo Shevardnadze (Seasons 3–present); Nino Sukhishvili (Seasons 1,3,5–present); Former; Levan Uchaneishvili (Season 1); Nino Ananiashvili (Season 1); Nanuka Zhorzholiani (Season 1–2); Nino Surguladze (Season 2); Ia Parulava (Season 2); Gota Kursuladze (Season 2); Marina Beridze (Season 2); Nikolay Tsiskaridze (Season 3); Otar Tatishvili (Season 3); Inga Grigorieva (Season 4); Levan Tsuladze (Season 4)	Ruska Makashvili (Season 1); Tiko Sadunishvili (Season 2); Nanka Kalatozishvili(Seasons 3–6); Duta Skhirtladze (Seasons 3–5; in Season 6 Participate); Giorgi kifshidze (Series 4); Manika Asatiani Ekaterine Amirejibi
Germany	Let's Dance	RTL	Season 1, 2006: Wayne Carpendale & Isabel Edvardsson; Season 2, 2007: Susan Sideropoulos & Christian Polanc; Season 3, 2010: Sophia Thomalla & Massimo Sinató; Season 4, 2011: Maite Kelly & Christian Polanc; Season 5, 2012: Magdalena Brzeska & Erich Klann; Season 6, 2013: Manuel Cortez & Melissa Ortiz Gomez; Season 7, 2014: Alexander Klaws & Isabel Edvardsson; Season 8, 2015: Hans Sarpei & Kathrin Menzinger; Season 9, 2016: Victoria Swarovski & Erich Klann; Season 10, 2017: Gil Ofarim & Ekaterina Leonova; Season 11, 2018: Ingolf Lück & Ekaterina Leonova; Season 12, 2019: Pascal Hens & Ekaterina Leonova; Season 13, 2020: Lili Paul-Roncalli & Massimo Sinató; Season 14, 2021: Rúrik Gíslason & Renata Lusin; Season 15, 2022: René Casselly & Kathrin Menzinger; Season 16, 2023: Anna Ermakova & Valentin Lusin; Season 17, 2024: Gabriel Kelly & Malika Dzumaev; Season 18, 2025: Diego Pooth & Ekaterina Leonova; Season 19, 2026: Anna-Carina Woitschack & Evgeny Vinokurov	Current; Joachim Llambi (Seasons 1–present); Motsi Mabuse (seasons 4–present); Jorge González (Seasons 6–present); Former; Roman Frieling (Seasons 4–5); Maite Kelly (Season 5); Harald Glööckler (Seasons 3–4); Peter Kraus (Season 3); Isabel Edvardsson (Season 3); Markus Schöffl (Seasons 1–2); Michael Hull (Seasons 1–2); Ute Lemper (Season 2); Katarina Witt (Season 1)	Current; Daniel Hartwich (Seasons 3–present); Victoria Swarovski (Seasons 11–present); Former; Hape Kerkeling (Seasons 1–2); Nazan Eckes (Seasons 1–3); Sylvie Meis (Seasons 4–10)
Germany	Let's Dance – Kids	TVNOW (stream); RTL (television); Super RTL (Upcoming)	Season 1, 2021: Jona Szewczenko & Tizio Tiago Domingues da Silva	Joachim Llambi; Motsi Mabuse; Jorge González	Daniel Hartwich; Victoria Swarovski
Greece	Dancing with the Stars	ANT1 (2010–2014, 2018); Star Channel (2021–2022)	Season 1, 2010: Errika Prezerakou & Thodoris Panagakos; Season 2, 2011: Argiris Aggelou & Emily Matthaiakaki; Season 3, 2012: Ntoretta Papadimitriou & Paulos Manogiannakis; Season 4, 2013: Isaias Matiamba & Maria Antimisari; Season 5, 2014: Morfoula Ntona & Richard Szilagyi; Season 6, 2018: Vangelis Kakouriotis & Nikoletta Mavridi; Season 7, 2021–22: Georgia Georgiou & Alexander Bachariev	Alexis Kostalas (Seasons 1–6); Giannis Latsios (Seasons 1–5); Fokas Evanggelinos (Seasons 1–3); Galena Velikova-Chaina (Seasons 1, 3–6); Errica Prezerakou (Season 2); Katia Dandoulaki (Seasons 3–5); Lakis Gavalas (Season 5); Eleonora Meleti (Season 6); Giorgos Liagkas (Season 4, Week 4 (Guest) / Season 6); Stefanos Dimoulas (Season 7); Marina Lampropoulou (Season 7); Elena Lizardou (Season 7); Jason Roditis (Season 7)	Zeta Makripoulia (Seasons 1–3); Doukissa Nomikou (Seasons 4–5); Evangelia Aravani (Season 6); Vicky Kaya (Season 7); Eleni Karpontini (Backstage, Season 1); Mairi Sinatsaki (Backstage, Season 2); Argiris Aggelou (Backstage, Season 3); Ntoretta Papadimitriou (Backstage, Season 4); Kostas Martakis (Backstage, Season 5); Savvas Poumpouras (Backstage, Season 6); Lambros Fisfis (Backstage, Season 7)
Hungary	Szombat esti láz	RTL Klub (2005–2008); RTL II (2013–2014)	Season 1, Spring 2006: Attila Czene & Petra Bánhidi; Season 2, Fall 2006: András Csonka & Andrea Keleti; Season 3, 2008: Attila Katus & Andrea Molnár; Season 4, 2013: Csaba Vastag & Tünde Mármarosi; Season 5, 2014: Judit Rezes & György Lehoczky	Lujza Pálinkó (2006–2008); Marcell Zsámboki (2006–2008); György Böhm (2006–2008); Ilona Medveczky (2006–2008); Andrea Keleti (2013–2014); Cecília Esztergályos (2013–2014); Tamás Szirtes (2013); Ákos Tihanyi (2013); András Csonka (2014); László Jáksó (2014)	Zsóka Kapócs (2006); András Stohl (2006); Nóra Ördög (2006–2008, 2014); Zoltán Bereczki (2008); András Csonka (2013); Lilu (2013)
Hungary	Dancing with the Stars	TV2 (2020–present)	Season 1, 2020: Tímea Gelencsér & Bertalan Hegyes; Season 2, 2021: Andi Tóth & Andrei Mangra; Season 3, 2022: Adél Csobot & Bertalan Hegyes; Season 4, 2023: Gábor Krausz & Anna Mikes; Season 5, 2024: Antal Strenner (WhisperTon) & Katica Tóth; Season 6, 2026: Upcoming season	Current; Nóra Ördög (2020–present); Vajk Szente (2022–present); Tamás Juronics (2022–present); Former; Miklós Schiffer (2020); Andrea Molnár (2020–2021); Gergely Csanád Kovács (2020–2021); Zoltán Bereczki (2021–2022)	Ramóna Kiss (2020–present); András Stohl (2020–present)
Iceland	Allir Geta Dansað	Stöð 2	Season 1, 2018: Jóhanna Guðrún Jónsdóttir & Maxim Petrov	Selma BjörnsdóttirJóhann Gunnar Arnarsson; Karen Björk Reeve	Eva Laufey Kjaran Hermannsdóttir; Sigrún Ósk Kristjánsdóttir
India	Jhalak Dikhhla Jaa	SET (Seasons 1–4, 11—); Colors TV (Seasons 5–10)	Season 1, 2006: Mona Singh & Toby Fernandes; Season 2, 2008: Prachi Desai & Deepak Singh; Season 3, 2009: Baichung Bhutia & Sonia Zaffer; Season 4, 2011: Meiyang Chang & Marischa Fernandes; Season 5, 2012: Gurmeet Choudhary & Shampa Sonthalia; Season 6, 2013: Drashti Dhami & Salman Yusuff Khan; Season 7, 2014: Ashish Sharma & Shampa Sonthalia; Season 8, 2015: Faisal Khan & Vaishnavi; Season 9, 2016: Teriya Magar & Aryan Patra; Season 10, 2022: Gunjan Sinha & Tejas Verma; Season 11, 2023: Manisha Rani & Ashutosh Pawar	Farah Khan (Seasons 1, 9, 11—); Malaika Arora Khan (Seasons 4, 8, 11—); Arshad Warsi (Season 11—); Shilpa Shetty (Season 1); Sanjay Leela Bhansali (Season 1); Urmila Matondkar (Season 2); Jeetendra (Season 2); Shiamak Davar (Season 2); Juhi Chawla (Season 3); Saroj Khan (Season 3); Vaibhavi Merchant (Season 3); Remo D'Souza (Seasons 4–7); Maksim Chmerkovskiy (Season 7); Shahid Kapoor (Season 8); Lauren Gottlieb (Season 8); Ganesh Hegde (Seasons 8–9); Jacqueline Fernandez (Season 9); Madhuri Dixit (Seasons 4–7, 10); Karan Johar (Seasons 5—10); Nora Fatehi (Season 10)	Gauahar Khan (Season 11–); Rithvik Dhanjani (Season 11–); Parmeet Sethi (Season 1); Archana Puran Singh (Season 1); Rohit Roy (Seasons 2–3); Shweta Tiwari (Season 3); Shiv Panditt (Season 3); Mona Singh (Seasons 2, 4); Sumeet Raghavan (Season 4); Ragini Khanna (Season 5); Kapil Sharma (Season 6); Drashti Dhami (Season 7); Ranvir Shorey (Season 7); Manish Paul (Seasons 5–10)
Indonesia	Dancing with the Stars Indonesia	Indosiar	Season 1, 2011: Fadli & Trisna; Season 2, 2011: Lucky Widja & Sri	Marcellino Lefrandt; Ralf Lepehne (season 1); Mieke Amalia (season 1); Espen Salberg (season 2); Aline Adita (season 2)	Choky Sitohang; Cathy Sharon; Marissa Nasution
Ireland	Dancing with the Stars	RTÉ One	Series 1, 2017: Aidan O'Mahony & Valeria Milova; Series 2, 2018: Jake Carter & Karen Byrne; Series 3, 2019: Mairéad Ronan & John Nolan; Series 4, 2020: Lottie Ryan & Pasquale La Rocca; Series 5, 2022: Nina Carberry & Pasquale La Rocca; Series 6, 2023: Carl Mullan & Emily Barker; Series 7, 2024: Jason Smyth & Karen Byrne; Series 8, 2025: Rhys McClenaghan & Laura Nolan; Series 9, 2026: Katelyn Cummins & Leonardo Lini	Current; Brian Redmond; Arthur Gourounlian (Series 5–); Karen Byrne (Series 8–); Oti Mabuse(Series 9–); Former; Julian Benson (Series 1–4); Loraine Barry (Series 1–8)	Current; Jennifer Zamparelli (Series 3–); Doireann Garrihy (Series 6–); Former; Amanda Byram (Series 1–2); Nicky Byrne (Series 1–5)
Israel	רוקדים עם כוכבים; Rokdim Im Kokhavim	Channel 2 (1–7); Channel 12 (8–present)	Season 1, 2005: Eliana Bakeer & Oron Dahan; Season 2, 2006: Guy Arieli & Masha Troyanski; Season 3, 2007: Rodrigo Gonzales & Naama Tavori; Season 4, 2008: Galit Giat & Kiril Sivolapov; Season 5, 2010: Michael Lewis & Ana Aharonov; Season 6, 2011: Shlomi Koriat & Hadas Fisher; Season 7, 2012: Asaf Hertz & Masha Troyansky; Season 8, 2022: Alex Shatilov & Nina Solovyov; Season 9, 2023: Adi Havshush & Artem Liaskovski / Matanel Konevsky; Season 10, 2024: Dor Harari & Julia Shachar; Season 11, 2025: Amir Shurush & Sana Sokol; Season 12, 2026: Amir Banai & Romy Nof	Current; Eli Mizrahi (Seasons 1–); Ana Aharonov (Season 8–); Haim Pershtein (Season 12–); David Dvir (Season 8–); Former; Uri Paster (Season 7); Michal Amdurski (Season 7); Gavri Levi (Seasons 1–2, 4–5); Dana Parnes (Season 5); Amir Fay Guttman (Season 5); Claude Dadia (Seasons 1–4, Season 6); Gaby Aldor (Seasons 1–2); Sally-Anne Friedland (Season 3); Yossi Yungman (Season 3); Ilanit Tadmor (Season 4); Hanna Laslo (Season 6); Rona-Lee Shimon (Season 8–9); Leah Yanai (Season 10–11)	Current; Lucy Ayoub (Season 8–); Former; Avi Kushnir (Season 1–6); Hilla Nachshon (Season 1–6); Guy Zu-Aretz (Season 7); Yarden Harel (Season 7); Assi Azar (Season 9)
Italy	Ballando con le Stelle	Rai 1	Season 1, 2005: Hoara Borselli & Simone Di Pasquale; Season 2, 2006: Cristina Chiabotto & Raimondo Todaro; Season 3, 2007: Fiona May & Raimondo Todaro; Season 4, 2008: Maria Elena Vandone & Samuel Peron; Season 5, 2009: Emanuele Filiberto & Natalia Titova; Season 6, 2010: Veronica Olivier & Raimondo Todaro; Season 7, 2011: Kaspar Capparoni & Yulia Musikhina; Season 8, 2012: Andres Gil & Anastasia Kuzmina; Season 9, 2013: Elisa Di Francisca & Raimondo Todaro; Season 10, 2014: Giusy Versace & Raimondo Todaro; Season 11, 2016: Iago García & Samanta Togni; Season 12, 2017: Oney Tapia & Veera Kinnunen; Season 13, 2018: Cesare Bocci & Alessandra Tripoli; Season 14, 2019: Lasse Matberg & Sara Di Vaira; Season 15, 2020: Gilles Rocca & Lucrezia Lando; Season 16, 2021: Arisa & Vito Coppola; Season 17, 2022: Luisella Costamagna & Pasquale La Rocca; Season 18, 2023: Wanda Nara & Pasquale La Rocca; Season 19, 2024: Bianca Guaccero & Giovanni Pernice; Season 20, 2025: Andrea Delogu & Nikita Perotti	Guillermo Mariotto (Seasons 1–); Ivan Zazzaroni (Season 3, 5–); Carolyn Smith (Seasons 4–); Fabio Canino (Seasons 4–); Selvaggia Lucarelli (Season 11–); Rafael Amargo (Seasons 9–10); Lamberto Sposini (Seasons 4–7); Amanda Lear (Seasons 1–2, 4); Lina Wertmüller (Season 3); Espen Salberg (Season 3); Heather Parisi (Seasons 1–2); Roberto Flemack (Seasons 1–2)	Milly Carlucci (Seasons 1–); Paolo Belli (Seasons 1–); Robozao (Seasons 13)
Kazakhstan	Звёздные танцы Zvyozdnye tancy	Channel 7	Season 1, 2012: Bayan Esentayeva & Euvgeni Moiseyev	Stanislav Popov (main judge)	Batyrzhan Tazabekov; Dylnaz Akhmadiyeva; Nartaz Adambayev
Latvia	Dejo ar zvaigzni!	TV3 Latvia	Season 1, 2007: Lauris Reiniks & Aleksandra Kurusova; Season 2, 2008: Raivis Vidzis & Viola Abramova; Season 3, 2010: Ainārs Ančevskis & Ieva Kemlere; Season 4, 2015: Liene Greifāne & Viktors Haritonovs; Season 5, 2022: Maksims Busels & Jelizaveta Manija	Current Iļja Vlasenko (Season 5–); Marta Kalēja-Irbe (Season 5–); Jānis Purviņš (Season 5–); Former; Three and then four per week (no fixed jury)	Current Martiņš Spuris (Season 5–); Arvis Zēmanis (Season 5–) Former; Iveta Feldmane (Seasons 1–3); Valters Krauze (Seasons 1–4); Jana Duļevska (Season 4)
Lebanon	Dancing with the Stars: Raqs el Noujoum رقص النجوم	MTV	Season 1, 2012–2013: Naya & Abdo Dalloul; Season 2, 2013–2014: Daniella Rahme & Raed Mourad; Season 3, 2015: Anthony Touma & Chloé Hourani; Season 4, 2017: Badih Abou Chacra and Sandra Abbas	Mazen Kiwan (Series 1–4); Mira Samaha (Series 1–4); Rabih Nahas (Series 1–4); Darren Bennett (Series 1–4)	Carla Haddad; Wissam Breidy
Lithuania	Šok su manimi (Note: Copycat version of the programme, not officially licensed.)	TV3 Lithuania	Season 1, 2009: Šorena Džaniašvili & Deividas Meškauskas; Season 2, 2010: Donatas Montvydas & Katerina Voropaj; Season 3, 2011–2012: Dominykas Vaitiekūnas & Justina Žemaitytė; Season 4, 2012–2013: Mindaugas Rainys & Milana Jašinskytė-Pankevičienė; Season 5, 2014–2015: Martynas Kavaliauskas & Renata Gramauskaitė		
Lithuania	Šok su žvaigžde	LRT	Season 1, 2019: Paula Valentaitė & Gedvinas Meškauskas; Season 2, 2020: Kristina Radžiukynaitė & Justas Girdvainis; Season 3, 2021: Paulina Taujanskaitė & Rolandas Beržinis		Current; Vytautas Rumšas; Gabrielė Martirosian
Mexico	Bailando por un Sueño	Televisa	Season 1, 2006: Latin Lover & Mariana Vallejo; Season 2, 2007: Alessandra Rosaldo & Israel Aquino; Season 3, 2014: María León & Adrián Arellano; Season 4, 2017: Adrián Di Monte & Montserrat Yescas	María León (Season 4); María José (Season 4); Gente De Zona (Season 4); Flavio Mendoza (Season 4); Former; Emma Pulido (Seasons 1–2); Edith González (Seasons 1–2); Félix Greco (Seasons 1–2); Roberto Mitsuko (Seasons 1–3); Bianca Marroquín (Season 3); Fey (Season 3); Carlos Baute (Season 3); Roberto Mitsuko (Season 4, weeks 3–5); Lolita Cortés (Season 4, weeks 4–5)	Javier Poza (Season 4); Bárbara Islas (Season 4); Adal Ramones (Seasons 1–2); Liza Echeverría (Seasons 1–2); Adrián Uribe (Season 3); Livia Brito (Season 3)
Mexico	Mira Quien Baila	Televisa	Season 1, 2018:	Lolita Cortés; Dayanara Torres; Joaquín Cortés	Javier Poza; Chiquinquirá Delgado
Mexico	México Baila	TV Azteca	Season 1, 2013: Niurka Marcos	Ema Pulido; Bibi Gaytan; Matilde Obregon	Rafael Araneda; Raquel Bigorra
Mongolia	Ододтой бүжиглэе	Mongol TV	Season 1, 2021: Battur Batbaatar & B. Khaliun; Season 2, 2025: T. Enerel & B. Batmanlai	Шүнгээгийн Баасан; Sarankhuu Ochirkhuu; Uuganbayar Enkhbat; Naran Surenjav	Manduul Baasansuren; Khongorzul Gankhuyag
Myanmar	Dancing with the Stars Myanmar	MRTV-4	Season 1, 2019–20: Nant Chit Nadi Zaw & Tae Min	Ian; Jimmy Ko Ko; Khine Lay	Kaung Htet Zaw; La Won Htet
Nepal	Dancing with the Stars Nepal	Himalaya TV	Season 1, 2020: Sumi Moktan & Biju Parki (Subiju); Season 2, 2022: Chhiring Sherpa & Saroj Rana Praja	Gauri Malla; Renasha Rai Rana; Dilip Rayamajhi	Suman Karki; Sadikshya Shrestha
Netherlands	Dancing with the Stars	RTL 4	Season 1, 2005: Jim Bakkum & Julie Fryer; Season 2, 2006: Barbara de Loor & Marcus van Teijlingen; Season 3, 2007: Helga van Leur & Marcus van Teijlingen; Season 4, 2009: Jamai Loman & Gwyneth van Rijn; Season 5, 2019: Samantha Steenwijk & Marcus van Teijlingen	Cor van de Stroet (Seasons 1–3); Marcel Bake (Seasons 1–3); Monique van Opstal (Seasons 1–3); Jan Postulart (Seasons 1–4); Julie Fryer (Season 4); Louis van Amstel (Season 5); Irene Moors (Season 5); Euvgenia Parakhina (Season 5); Dan Karaty (Season 5)	Ron Brandsteder (Seasons 1–3); Sylvana Simons (Seasons 1–3); Beau van Erven Dorens (Season 4); Lieke van Lexmond (Season 4); Tijl Beckand (Season 5); Chantal Janzen (Season 5)
Netherlands	Strictly Come Dancing	AVRO	Season 1, 2012: Mark van Eeuwen & Jessica Maybury	Ruud Vermeij; Euvgenia Parakhina; Dario Gargiulo	Reinout Oerlemans; Kim-Lian van der Meij
New Zealand	Dancing with the Stars	TV One (2005–2009); Three (2015, 2018–)	Season 1, 2005: Norm Hewitt & Carol-Ann Hickmore; Season 2, 2006: Lorraine Downes & Aaron Gilmore; Season 3, 2007: Suzanne Paul & Stefano Olivieri; Season 4, 2008: Temepara George & Stefano Olivieri; Season 5, 2009: Tāmati Coffey & Samantha Hitch; Season 6, 2015: Simon Barnett & Vanessa Cole; Season 7, 2018: Sam Hayes & Aaron Gilmore; Season 8, 2019: Manu Vatuvei & Loryn Reynolds; Season 9, 2022: Jazz Thornton & Brad Coleman	Current; Camilla Sacre-Dallerup (Seasons 7–present); Elektra Shock (Seasons 9–present); Lance Savali (Seasons 9–present) Former; Julz Tocker (Seasons 7–8); Rachel White (Seasons 7–8); Stefano Olivieri (Season 6); Candy Lane (Season 6); Hayley Holt (Season 6); Alison Leonard (Seasons 1–5); Brendan Cole (Seasons 1–5); Paul Mercurio (Seasons 1–2, 4–5); Craig Revel Horwood (Seasons 3–5); Donna Dawson (Seasons 1); Carol-Ann Hickmore (Seasons 2–3)	Current; Sharyn Casey (Seasons 6–present); Clint Randell (Season 9–present) Former; Dai Henwood (Seasons 7–8); Dominic Bowden (Season 6); Jason Gunn (Seasons 1–5); Candy Lane (Seasons 1–5)
North Macedonia	Танц со Ѕвездите; Tanc so Zvezdite	MRT 1	Season 1, 2013: Atanas Nikolovski & Jovana Vasileva; Season 2, 2014: Natasa Ilievska & Daniel Kimovski		Toni Mihajlovski; Marijana Stanojkovska
Norway	Skal vi danse?	TV 2	Season 1, 2006: Katrine Moholt & Bjørn Wettre Holthe; Season 2, 2006: Kristian Ødegård & Alexandra Kakurina; Season 3, 2007: Tshawe Baqwa & Maria Sandvik; Season 4, 2008: Lene Alexandra Øien & Tom Erik Nilsen; Season 5, 2009: Carsten Skjelbreid & Elena Bokoreva Wiulsrud; Season 6, 2010: Åsleik Engmark & Nadya Khamitskaya; Season 7, 2011: Atle Pettersen & Marianne Sandaker; Season 8, 2012: Hanne Sørvaag & Egor Filipenko; Season 9, 2013: Eirik Søfteland & Nadya Khamitskaya; Season 10, 2014: Agnete Saba & Egor Filipenko; Season 11, 2015: Adelén & Benjamin Jayakoddy; Season 12, 2016: Eilev Bjerkerud & Nadya Khamitskaya; Season 13, 2017: Helene Olafsen & Jørgen Nilsen; Season 14, 2018: Einar Nilsson & Anette Stokke; Season 15, 2019: Aleksander Hetland & Nadya Khamitskaya; Season 16, 2020: Andreas Solberg Wahl & Mai Mentzoni; Season 17, 2021: Simon Nitsche & Helene Spilling; Season 18, 2022: Cengiz Al & Rikke Lund; Season 19, 2023: Alexandra Joner & Ole Thomas Hansen; Season 20, 2025: Tale Torjussen & Antonio Careri	Current; Trine Dehli Cleve (Seasons 1–present); Morten Hegseth (Seasons 17–present); Merete Lingjærde (Seasons 11–present); Former; Toni Ferraz (Season 10); Gyda Bloch Thorsen (Season 10); Anita Langset (Season 1); Trond Harr (Seasons 1–3); Tor Fløysvik (Seasons 1–9); Cecilie Brinck Rygel (Season 2); Christer Tornell (Seasons 3–9); Alexandra Kakurina (Season 4); Karianne Stensen Gulliksen (Seasons 5–9)	Current; Helene Olafsen (Seasons 18–present); Anders Hoff (Seasons 13 –present); Former; Tommy Steine (Seasons 1–2); Guri Solberg (Seasons 1–4 & 9); Kristian Ødegård (Seasons 3–6); Pia Lykke (Season 5); Marthe Sveberg Bjørstad (Season 6); Yngvar Numme (Season 7); Carsten Skjelbreid (Seasons 8–9)
Panama	Dancing with the Stars Panamá		Season 1, 2012: Michael Vega & Johan Pérez; Season 2, 2013: Jimmy Bad Boy & Ilda Mason	Moyra Brunette; David Martínez; Yilca Arosemena Espino	Blanca Herrera; Iván Donoso
Poland	Taniec z gwiazdami	TVN (2005–2011)	Season 1, Spring 2005: Olivier Janiak & Kamila Kajak; Season 2, Fall 2005: Katarzyna Cichopek & Marcin Hakiel; Season 3, Spring 2006: Rafał Mroczek & Aneta Piotrowska; Season 4, Fall 2006: Kinga Rusin & Stefano Terrazzino; Season 5, Spring 2007: Krzysztof Tyniec & Kamila Kajak; Season 6, Fall 2007: Anna Guzik & Łukasz Czarnecki; Season 7, Spring 2008: Magdalena Walach & Cezary Olszewski; Season 8, Fall 2008: Agata Kulesza & Stefano Terrazzino; Season 9, Spring 2009: Dorota Gardias & Andrej Mosejcuk; Season 10, Fall 2009: Anna Mucha & Rafał Maserak; Season 11, Spring 2010: Julia Kamińska & Rafał Maserak; Season 12, Fall 2010: Monika Pyrek & Robert Rowiński; Season 13, Fall 2011: Kacper Kuszewski & Anna Głogowska	Iwona Szymańska-Pavlović (1–13); Piotr Galiński (1–13); Janusz Józefowicz (13); Jolanta Fraszyńska (13); Zbigniew Wodecki (1–12); Beata Tyszkiewicz (1–12)	Natasza Urbańska (13); Piotr Gąsowski (6–13); Katarzyna Skrzynecka (2–12); Hubert Urbański (1–5); Magda Mołek (1)
Poland	Dancing with the Stars. Taniec z gwiazdami	Polsat (2014–present)	Season 14, Spring 2014: Aneta Zając & Stefano Terrazzino; Season 15, Fall 2014: Agnieszka Sienkiewicz & Stefano Terrazzino; Season 16, Spring 2015: Krzysztof Wieszczek & Agnieszka Kaczorowska; Season 17, Fall 2015: Ewelina Lisowska & Tomasz Barański; Season 18, Spring 2016: Anna Karczmarczyk & Jacek Jeschke; Season 19, Fall 2016: Robert Wabich & Hanna Żudziewicz; Season 20, Spring 2017: Natalia Szroeder & Jan Kliment; Season 21, Spring 2018: Beata Tadla & Jan Kliment; Season 22, Spring 2019: Joanna Mazur & Jan Kliment; Season 23, Fall 2019: Damian Kordas & Janja Lesar; Season 24, Spring, Fall 2020: Edyta Zając & Michał Bartkiewicz; Season 25, Fall 2021: Piotr Mróz & Hanna Żudziewicz; Season 26, Fall 2022: Ilona Krawczyńska & Robert Rowiński; Season 27, Spring 2024: Anita Sokołowska & Jacek Jeschke; Season 28, Fall 2024: Vanessa Aleksander & Michał Bartkiewicz; Season 29, Spring 2025: Maria Jeleniewska & Jacek Jeschke; Season 30, Fall 2025: Mikołaj Bagiński & Magdalena Tarnowska; Season 31, Spring 2026: Gamou Fall & Hanna Żudziewicz; Season 32, Fall 2026:	Current; Iwona Pavlović (14–); Rafał Maserak (27-); Tomasz Wygoda (27-); Julia Wieniawa (32-); Former; Ewa Kasprzyk (27-31); Andrzej Piaseczny (25–26); Michał Malitowski (14–21, 22; week 11, 23–26); Andrzej Grabowski (14–26); Ola Jordan (21–22); Beata Tyszkiewicz (14–20)	Current; Krzysztof Ibisz (14–); Paulina Sykut-Jeżyna (18–); Former; Anna Głogowska (14–17); Izabela Janachowska (25-26)
Portugal	Dança Comigo	RTP1	Season 1, 2006: Daniela Ruah; Season 2, 2006: Sónia Araújo; Season 3, 2007: Luciana Abreu; Season 4, 2008: Vítor Fonseca; Season 5, 2023: Inês Aires Pereira	João Baião (season 1–4); Marco de Camilis (season 1–4); São José Lapa (season 1–3); Rita Blanco (season 4); Filipe La Féria (season 5); Sónia Araújo (season 5); Noua Wong (season 5)	Catarina Furtado (season 1, 4); Silvia Alberto (season 1–3, 5)
Portugal	Dança Comigo no Gelo	RTP1	Season 1, 2009: Sónia Araújo	João Baião; Rita Blanco; Marco de Camilis	Catarina Furtado (season 1)
Portugal	Dança com as Estrelas	TVI	Season 1, 2013: Sara Matos & André; Season 2, 2014: Lourenço Ortigão & Mónica; Season 3, 2015: Sara Prata & Marco; Season 4, 2018–19: José Condessa & Ana Cardoso; Season 5, 2020: Cancelled due to COVID-19 pandemic Season 6, 2024: Upcoming Season	Current; Alexandra Lencastre(1–4, 6-); Alberto Rodrigues (1–3, 5-); Vítor Fonseca; Former; Duarte Vieira (4); Jessica Athayde (5)	Current; Cristina Ferreira (1–3, 6-); Bruno Cabrerizo (6-); Former; Rita Pereira (4–5); Pedro Teixeira (3–5)
Romania	Dansez pentru tine (Dancing for you)	Pro TV	Season 1, Spring 2006: Andra & Florin Birică; Season 2, Fall 2006: Victor Slav & Carmen Stepan; Season 3, Spring 2007: Cosmin Stan & Doina Ocu; Season 4, Fall 2007: Alex Velea & Cristina Stoicescu; Season 5, Spring 2008: Andreea Bălan & Petrişor Ruge; Season 6, Fall 2008: Giulia Anghelescu & Andrei Ştefan; Season 7, Spring 2009: Monica Irimia & Darius Belu; Season 8, Fall 2009: Jean de la Craiova & Sandra Neacşu; Season 9, Spring 2010: Cătălin Moroşanu & Magda Ciorobea; Season 10, Fall 2010: Octavian Strunilă & Ella Dumitru; Season 11, Spring 2011: Corina Bud & Eduard Ionuţ Vasile; Season 12, Fall 2011: Jojo & Ionuț Tănase; Season 13, 2012: Roxana Ionescu & George Boghian; Season 14, 2013: Ilinca Vandici & Răzvan Marton	Current Mihai Petre (1–14); Emilia Popescu (2–14); Beatrice Rancea (4–14); Edi Stancu (13–14); Elwira Petre (14); Former; Răzvan Mazilu (1–2); Mariana Bitang (1–2); Octavian Bellu (1/2); Cornel Patrichi (2–12); Willmark Rizzo (1–13)	Current Ștefan Bănică Jr. (Seasons 1–14); Iulia Vântur (Seasons 2–14); Former; Olivia Steer (Season 1)
Romania	Dansează printre stele (Dancing with the stars)	Antena 1	Season 1, 2014: Alina Pușcaș & Bogdan Boantă	Mihai Petre; Jojo; Igor Munteanu	Horia Brenciu; Lili Sandu; Victor Slav
Romania	Uite cine dansează! (Look who's dancing)	Pro TV	Season 1, 2017: Marius Manole & Olesea Nespeac-Micula	Mihai Petre; Florin Călinescu; Andreea Marin; Gigi Căciuleanu	Mihaela Rădulescu; Cabral Ibacka
Russia	Танцы со звёздами (Tantsy so zvyozdami)	Russia-1	Season 1, 2006: Maria Sittel & Vladislav Borodinov; Season 2, 2006: Anna Snatkina & Euvgeni Grigorov; Season 3, 2008: Daria Sagalova & Anton Kovalev; Season 4, 2009: Yulia Savicheva & Euvgeni Papunaishvili; Season 5, 2010: Anastasia Stockaya & Alexey Ledenev; Season 6, 2011: Tatiana Bulanova & Dimitry Lashenko; Season 7, 2012: Glukoza & Euvgeni Papunaishvili; Season 8, 2013: Yelena Podkaminskaya & Andrei Karpov; Season 9, 2015: Irina Pegova & Andrei Kozlovskiy; Season 10, 2016: Aleksandra Ursulyak & Denis Tagintsev; Season 11, 2020: Ivan Stebunov & Inna Svechnikova; Season 12, 2021: Sergey Lazarev & Ekaterina Osipova; Season 13, 2022: Alexandra Revenko & Denis Tagintsev	Nicolaj Ciskaridze (Seasons 2–8, 10–13); Egor Druginin (Seasons 6–8, 11–13); Yelena Chaykovskaya (Seasons 7–8); Oleg Menshikov (Seasons 8); Vladimir Ivanov (Seasons 8); Irina Viner (Seasons 1, 9); Valentin Gneushev (Season 1); Vladimir Andrukin (Seasons 1–3); Stanislav Popov (Seasons 1–6, 10); Alla Sigalova (Seasons 1–6); Anastasia Volochkova (Season 7)	Andrei Malakhov (Season 11–13); Garik Martirosyan (Season 10); Daria Spiridonova (Zlatopolskaya) (Seasons 4–10); Maxim Galkin (Seasons 4–9); Anastasia Zavorotnyuk (Seasons 1–3); Yuri Nikolaev (Seasons 1–3)
Serbia	Ples sa zvezdama	Prva	Season 1, 2014: Ivan Mihailović & Marija Martinović	Nikola Mandić; Marija Prelević; Aleksandar Josipović; Konstantin Kostjukov	Irina Radović; Aleksa Jelić
Slovakia	Let's Dance	Markiza	Season 1, 2006: Zuzana Fialová & Peter Modrovský; Season 2, 2008: Michaela Čobejová & Tomáš Surovec; Season 3, 2009: Juraj Mokrý & Katarína Štumpfová; Season 4, 2010: Nela Pocisková & Peter Modrovský; Season 5, 2011: Janka Hospodárová & Matej Chren; Season 6, 2017: Vladimír Kobielsky & Dominika Chrapeková; Season 7, 2022: Ján Koleník & Vanda Polaková; Season 8, 2023: Jana Kovalčiková & Vilém Šír; Season 9, 2024: Jakub Jablonský & Eliška Lenčešová; Season 10, 2025: Kristián Baran & Dominika Rošková; Season 11, 2026: Zuzana Porubjaková & Matyáš Adamec	Current; Ján Ďurovčík (1-3, 5-); Tatiana Drexler (2-4, 6-); Adela Vinczeová (7-); Former Elena Jágerská (1); Dagmar Hubová (1, 3-4); Jozef Bednárik (1-5); Zdeněk Chlopčík (4-5); Dara Rolins (5); Petr Horáček (6); Zuzana Fialová (2, 6); Jorge González (7); Ján Koleník (8)	Current; Viktor Vincze (7-); Lucia Hlaváčková (8-); Former; Martin "Pyco" Rausch (1-4, 6); Adela Vinczeová (1-2, 4-6); Zuzana Fialová (3); Libor Bouček (5); Martina Zábranská (7)
Slovakia	Bailando - Tanec pre teba	Markiza	Season 1, 2007: Viktória Ráková & Juraj Šoltés	Josef Laufer; Mário Radačovský; Helena Štiavnická; Ján Ďurovčík	Viliam Rozboril
Slovakia	Tanec snov	TV JOJ	Season 1, 2015: Diana Mórová & Andrej Krížik	Peter Modrovský; Eva Máziková; Ján Ďurovčík	Viliam Rozboril
Slovenia	Zvezde plešejo	POP TV	Season 1, 2017: Dejan Vunjak & Tadeja Pavlič; Season 2, 2018: Natalija Gros & Miha Perat; Season 3, 2019: Tanja Žagar & Arnej Ivkovič; Season 4, 2020: Cancelled due to COVID-19 pandemic	Katarina Venturini (Seasons 1–4); Andrej Škufca (Seasons 1–4); Nika Urbas Ambrožič (Seasons 1–4); Lado Bizovičar (Seasons 1–4)	Peter Poles (Seasons 1–4); Tara Zupančič (Seasons 1–4)
South Africa	Strictly Come Dancing	SABC 2 (2006–08); SABC3 (2013–15)	Season 1, 2006: Zuraida Jardine & Michael Wentink; Season 2, 2006: Riann Venter & Hayley Hammond; Season 3, 2007: Hip Hop Pantsula & Hayley Bennett; Season 4, 2008: Emmanuel Castis & Lindsey Muckle; Season 5, 2008: Rob van Vuuren & Mary Martin; Season 6, 2013: Zakeeya Patel & Ryan Hammond; Season 7, 2014: Jonathan Boynton-Lee & Hayley Bennett; Season 8, 2015: Karlien van Jaarsveld & Devon Snell	Michael Wentink (Seasons 6–8); Tebogo Kgobokoe (Seasons 6–8); Samantha Peo (Seasons 6–8); Dave Campbell (Seasons 1–5); Salome Sechele (Seasons 1–5); Lilian Phororo (Seasons 1–5); Tyrone Watkins (Seasons 1–5)	Marc Lottering (Seasons 6–8); Pabi Moloi (Seasons 6–8); Ian von Memerty (Seasons 1–5); Sandy Ngema (Seasons 1–5)
South Africa	Dancing with the Stars	M-Net	Season 1, 2018: Connell Cruise and Marcella Solimeo	Tebogo Kgobokoe; Bryan Watson; Debbie Turner; Jason Gilkison	Tracey Lange; Chris Jaftha
South Korea	Dancing with the Stars	MBC	Season 1, 2011: Moon Hee-joon & Ahn Hye-sang; Season 2, 2012: Choi Yeo-jin & Park Ji-woo; Season 3, 2013: Fei & Kim Soo Ro	Kim Ju-Won; Alex Kim (Seasons 2–3); Park Sang-won (Season 3); Nam Kyeong-Ju (Season 1); Hwang Sun-Woo (Season 1); Song Seung-Hwan (Season 2)	Lee Deok-hwa; Kim Gyu-ri (Seasons 2–3); Lee So-ra (Season 1)
Spain	¡Mira quién baila! (Seasons 1–7, 9) ¡Más que baile! (Season 8)	La 1 (2005–09, 2014); Telecinco (2010)	Season 1, 2005: Claudia Molina; Season 2, 2006: David Civera; Season 3, 2006: Rosa López; Season 4, 2006: Estela Giménez; Season 5, 2007: Manolo Sarriá; Season 6, 2007: Nani Gaitán; Season 7, 2009: Manuel Bandera; Season 8, 2010: Belén Esteban; Season 9, 2014: Miguel Abellán	Joana Subirana (Seasons 1–8); Javier Castillo (Seasons 1–5); Teté Delgado (Seasons 1–3, 5); Fernando Romay (Seasons 2–3); Rosario Pardo (Season 4); Boris Izaguirre (Seasons 6–8); Aída Gómez (Seasons 6–8); César Cadaval (Season 6); Victor Ullate Roche (Season 8); Santi Rodríguez (Season 8); El Sevilla (Season 9); Noemí Galera (Season 9); Norma Duval (Season 9); Ángel Corella (Season 9)	Anne Igartiburu (Seasons 1–7); Pilar Rubio (Season 8); Jaime Cantizano (Season 9)
Spain	Bailando con las estrellas	La 1 (2018); Telecinco (2024–)	Season 1, 2018: David Bustamante and Yana Oliana; Season 2, 2024: María Isabel and Luis Montero; Season 3 , 2025 Jorge González and Gemma Domínguez	Current; Blanca Li (Season 2–); Gorka Márquez (Season 2–); Julia Gómez Cora (Season 2–); Pelayo Díaz (Season 3–); Inmaculada Casal (Season 3–); Former; Moira Chapman (Season 1); Joaquín Cortés (Season 1); Isabel Pérez (Season 1); Boris Izaguirre (Season 2); Antonia Dell’Atte (Season 2)	Current; Jesús Vázquez (Season 2–); Valeria Mazza (Season 2–); Former; Roberto Leal (Season 1); Rocío Muñoz Morales (Season 1)
Sweden	Let's Dance	TV4	Season 1, 2006: Måns Zelmerlöw & Maria Karlsson; Season 2, 2007: Martin Lidberg & Cecilia Ehrling; Season 3, 2008: Tina Nordström & Tobias Karlsson; Season 4, 2009: Magnus Samuelsson & Annika Sjöö; Season 5, 2010: Mattias Andréasson & Cecilia Ehrling; Season 6, 2011: Jessica Andersson & Kristjan Lootus; Season 7, 2012: Anton Hysén & Sigrid Bernson; Season 8, 2013: Markoolio & Cecilia Ehrling; Season 9, 2014: Benjamin Wahlgren Ingrosso & Sigrid Bernson; Season 10, 2015: Ingemar Stenmark & Cecilia Ehrling; Season 11, 2016: Elisa Lindström & Yvo Essen; Season 12, 2017: Jesper Blomqvist & Malin Watson; Season 13, 2018: Jon Henrik Fjällgren & Katja Luján Engelholm; Season 14, 2019: Kristin Kaspersen & Calle Sterner; Season 15, 2020: John Lundvik & Linn Hegdal; Season 16, 2021: Filip Lamprecht & Linn Hegdal; Season 17, 2022: Eric Saade & Katja Lujan Engelholm; Season 18, 2023: Hampus Hedström & Ines Maria Ștefănescu; Season 19, 2025: Theoz & Paulina Rosenkvist	Current; Ann Wilson (Seasons 1–18); Tony Irving (Seasons 1–18, 20); Dermot Clemenger (Seasons 1–10, 15–18); Former; Maria Öhrman (Seasons 1–5); Isabel Edvardsson (Season 6); Cecilia Lazar (Seasons 11–14)	David Hellenius (Seasons 1–20); David Lindgren (Seasons 16–18); Agneta Sjödin (Seasons 1–2); Jessica Almenäs (Seasons 3–11); Kristin Kaspersen (Seasons 18); Petra Mede (Seasons 16–17); Tilde de Paula (Seasons 12–15)
Thailand	Dancing with the Stars	BBTV Channel 7	Season 1, 2013: Timethai Plangsilp & Pinklao Nararuk	Tinakorn Asvarak; Manaswee Kridtanukul; Amon Chatpaisal	Morakot Kittisara (Season 1–present); Piyawat Khemthong (Season 1–present); Former: Sornram Teppitak (Season 1)
Turkey	Yok Böyle Dans	Show TV	Season 1, 2010: Azra Akın & Nikolay Monolov; Season 2, 2011: Özge Ulusoy & Vitali Kozmin	Sait Sökmen (Season 1–2); Tan Sağtürk (Season 1–2); Acun Ilıcalı (Season 2); Azra Akın (Season 2); Lilia Bennett (Season 1); Saba Tümer (Season 1)	Acun Ilıcalı (Season 1); Hanzade Ofluoğlu (Season 1–2); Burcu Esmersoy(Season 2); Cem Ceminay (Season 2)
Ukraine	Танці з зірками Tantsi z zirkamy	1+1 (2006–2007; 2017–2025)	Season 1, 2006: Volodymyr Zelenskyy & Olena Shoptenko; Season 2, Spring 2007: Lilia Podkopayeva & Sergey Kostecki; Season 3, Fall 2007: Marcin Mroczek & Anna Pilipenko; Season 4, 2017: Natalia Mohylevska & Ihor Kuzmenko; Season 5, 2018: Ihor Lastochkin & Ilona Hvozdeva; Season 6, 2019: Kseniya Mishyna & Yevhen Kot; Season 7, 2020: Santa Dimopulos & Maks Leonov; Season 8, 2021: Artur Lohai & Anna Karelina; Special, 2025: Rusia Danilkina & Pavlo Simakin	Francisco Gomez (Season 7); Vlad Yama (Seasons 5–8); Kateryna Kuhar (Seasons 5–8); Monatik (Seasons 5–6); Gregory Chapkis (Seasons 1–3, 7–8); Helen Kolyadenko (Seasons 1–3); Alex Litvinov (Seasons 1–3)	Yuriy Horbunov (Seasons 1–8, the special); Tina Karol (Seasons 1–8)
Ukraine	Танці з зірками Tantsi z zirkamy	STB (2011)	Season 1, 2011: Stas Shurins & Olena Pul	Radu Poklitaru (Season 1); Tetyana Denisova (Season 1); Yaakko Toyvonen (Season 1); Natalia Mohilevska (Season 1)	Iryna Borysyuk (Season 4); Dmytro Tankovych (Season 4)
United Kingdom (original)	Strictly Come Dancing	BBC One	Series 1, Spring/Summer 2004: Natasha Kaplinsky & Brendan Cole; Series 2, Autumn 2004: Jill Halfpenny & Darren Bennett; Series 3, 2005: Darren Gough & Lilia Kopylova; Series 4, 2006: Mark Ramprakash & Karen Hardy; Series 5, 2007: Alesha Dixon & Matthew Cutler; Series 6, 2008: Tom Chambers & Camilla Dallerup; Series 7, 2009: Chris Hollins & Ola Jordan; Series 8, 2010: Kara Tointon & Artem Chigvintsev; Series 9, 2011: Harry Judd & Aliona Vilani; Series 10, 2012: Louis Smith & Flavia Cacace; Series 11, 2013: Abbey Clancy & Aljaž Skorjanec; Series 12, 2014: Caroline Flack & Pasha Kovalev; Series 13, 2015: Jay McGuiness & Aliona Vilani; Series 14, 2016: Ore Oduba & Joanne Clifton; Series 15, 2017: Joe McFadden & Katya Jones; Series 16, 2018: Stacey Dooley & Kevin Clifton; Series 17, 2019: Kelvin Fletcher & Oti Mabuse; Series 18, 2020: Bill Bailey & Oti Mabuse; Series 19, 2021: Rose Ayling-Ellis & Giovanni Pernice; Series 20, 2022: Hamza Yassin & Jowita Przystał; Series 21, 2023: Ellie Leach & Vito Coppola; Series 22, 2024: Chris McCausland & Dianne Buswell; Series 23, 2025: Karen Carney & Carlos Gu	Current; Craig Revel Horwood; Shirley Ballas (15–); Motsi Mabuse (17–); Anton du Beke (19–); Former; Arlene Phillips (1–6); Alesha Dixon (7–9); Len Goodman (1–14); Darcey Bussell (10–16); Bruno Tonioli (1–17)	Current; Emma Willis (24–); Josh Widdicombe (24–); Johannes Radebe (24–); Former; Sir Bruce Forsyth (1–11); Tess Daly (1–23); Claudia Winkleman (12–23)
United States	Dancing with the Stars	ABC (1–30, 32–); Disney+ (31–)	Season 1, 2005: Kelly Monaco & Alec Mazo; Season 2, Winter 2006: Drew Lachey & Cheryl Burke; Season 3, Fall 2006: Emmitt Smith & Cheryl Burke; Season 4, Spring 2007: Apolo Anton Ohno & Julianne Hough; Season 5, Fall 2007: Hélio Castroneves & Julianne Hough; Season 6, Spring 2008: Kristi Yamaguchi & Mark Ballas; Season 7, Fall 2008: Brooke Burke & Derek Hough; Season 8, Spring 2009: Shawn Johnson & Mark Ballas; Season 9, Fall 2009: Donny Osmond & Kym Johnson; Season 10, Spring 2010: Nicole Scherzinger & Derek Hough; Season 11, Fall 2010: Jennifer Grey & Derek Hough; Season 12, Spring 2011: Hines Ward & Kym Johnson; Season 13, Fall 2011: J. R. Martinez & Karina Smirnoff; Season 14, Spring 2012: Donald Driver & Peta Murgatroyd; Season 15, Fall 2012: Melissa Rycroft & Tony Dovolani; Season 16, Spring 2013: Kellie Pickler & Derek Hough; Season 17, Fall 2013: Amber Riley & Derek Hough; Season 18, Spring 2014: Meryl Davis & Maksim Chmerkovskiy; Season 19, Fall 2014: Alfonso Ribeiro & Witney Carson; Season 20, Spring 2015: Rumer Willis & Valentin Chmerkovskiy; Season 21, Fall 2015: Bindi Irwin & Derek Hough; Season 22, Spring 2016: Nyle DiMarco & Peta Murgatroyd; Season 23, Fall 2016: Laurie Hernandez & Valentin Chmerkovskiy; Season 24, Spring 2017: Rashad Jennings & Emma Slater; Season 25, Fall 2017: Jordan Fisher & Lindsay Arnold; Season 26, Spring 2018: Adam Rippon & Jenna Johnson; Season 27, Fall 2018: Bobby Bones & Sharna Burgess; Season 28, 2019: Hannah Brown & Alan Bersten; Season 29, 2020: Kaitlyn Bristowe & Artem Chigvintsev; Season 30, 2021: Iman Shumpert & Daniella Karagach; Season 31, 2022: Charli D'Amelio & Mark Ballas; Season 32, 2023: Xochitl Gomez & Val Chmerkovskiy; Season 33, 2024: Joey Graziadei & Jenna Johnson; Season 34, 2025: Robert Irwin & Witney Carson; Season 35, 2026: upcoming season	Current; Carrie Ann Inaba; Bruno Tonioli; Derek Hough (29–); Former; Len Goodman (1–20, 22–28, 30–31); Julianne Hough (19–21, 23–24)	Current; Alfonso Ribiero (31–); Julianne Hough (32–); Former; Tom Bergeron (1–28); Lisa Canning (1); Samantha Harris (2–9); Brooke Burke Charvet (10–17); Erin Andrews (18–28); Tyra Banks (29–31)
United States	Dancing with the Stars: Juniors	ABC	Season 1, 2018: Sky Brown & JT Church	Adam Rippon; Valentin Chmerkovskiy; Mandy Moore	Jordan Fisher; Frankie Muniz
United States	Dancing with the Stars: The Next Pro	ABC	Season 1, 2026: Adele Zaikman	Mark Ballas; Shirley Ballas	Robert Irwin
United States	¡Mira quién baila! (in Spanish)	Univisión	Season 1, 2010: Vadhir Derbez; Season 2, 2011: Adamari López; Season 3, 2012: Henry Santos; Season 4, 2013: Johnny Lozada; Season 5, 2017: Dayanara Torres; Season 6, 2018: Greeicy Rendón; All Stars, 2019: Clarissa Molina; All Stars, 2020: Kiara Liz; Univisión All Stars, 2021: Jesus Díaz "Chef Yisus"; All Stars, 2022: María León ¡La revancha!, 2023: Adrián Lastra	Current; Roselyn Sánchez (Season 5–); Johnny Lozada (Season 5–); Javier Castillo (Season 5–); Former; Alejandra Guzmán (Season 1); Lili Estefan (Season 2–3); Bianca Marroquín; Horacio Villalobos; Ninel Conde (Season 4)	Javier Poza; Chiquinquirá Delgado; Jomari Goyso (Season 5–)
Vietnam	Bước nhảy hoàn vũ	VTV3	Season 1, 2010: Ngô Thanh Vân & Tihomir Gavrilov Season 2, 2011: Vũ Thu Minh & Lachezar Todorov; Season 3, 2012: Minh Hằng & Atanas Malamov; Season 4, 2013: Yến Trang & Tihomir Gavrilov; Series 5, 2014: Thu Thủy & Daniel Denev and Ngân Khánh & Kristian Yordanov; Season 6, 2015: Ninh Dương Lan Ngọc & Daniel Nikolov Denev; Season 7, 2016: S.T Sơn Thạch & Vyara Season 8, 2024: Quỳnh Nga	Current; Khánh Thi Chí Anh (Season 1–3, 7,8); Đoan Trang & S.T Sơn Thạch (Season 8); Former; Lê Hoàng (Seasons 1 & 4); Nguyễn Quang Dũng (Seasons 1–2); Trần Tiến (Season 2); Đức Huy (Season 2); Quốc Bảo (Season 3); Hồ Hoài Anh (Season 3) Trần Ly Ly (Seasons 4–7) Hồng Việt (Season 7); Minh Hằng (Seasons 4–7); John Huy Trần (Season 7)	Thanh Bạch (Seasons 1–2, 6–7) Mỹ Linh (Seasons 6–7); Nguyên Khang (Seasons 5, 8); Yến Trang (Season 5); Thanh Vân (Seasons 1 & 3); Đoan Trang (Season 2); Nguyên Vũ (Season 3); Đông Nhi (Season 4); Lương Mạnh Hải (Season 4); Vũ Mạnh Cường (Season 8)

== Duets ==
- Original name: Duets
- Origin: United States of America
- Date started: May 24, 2012
- Creator: Keep Calm and Carry On Productions
- First network to broadcast: ABC
- First country to adapt: China

Country	TV network(s)	Name	Host	Season	Coaches	Winner	Status
China	BTV	最美和声	Yang Kun (season 1); Li kun (season 2 - 3)	Season 1: 2013; Season 2: 2014; Season 3: 2015	Jam Hsiao (season 1 - 3); Chen Yufan (season 1); Hu Haiquan (Yu Quan) (season 1); Christine Fan (season 1); Huang Qishan (season 2); David Tao (season 2); Sun Nan (season 2); Yang Kun (season 3); Jason Zhang (season 3); Sitar Tan (season 3)	TBA	Discontinuted
Jordan	Amman TV	Duets غني ع الصح	saad zghoul Diana areeqat	season 1:2018/2019	Hussein Al-Salman(season 1); Linda Hegazi(Season 1); Metaab Al-Saqqar(Season 1); Saad Abu Tayeh(Season 1)		

== The Farm ==
Original name: Farmen
Origin: Sweden
Creator: Strix
First network to broadcast: TV4
First country to adapt: Sweden

Currently airing
An upcoming season
Status unknown
No longer airing

Country/Region	Official name	Network(s)	Winner(s)	Main Presenter(s)
Albania	Ferma VIP (Celebrity Format)	Vizion Plus; Tring (live)	Season 1, 2024: Dijonis Biba; Season 2, 2025: Gerald "Big Basta" Xhari; Season 3, 2026: Mimoza Ahmeti; Season 4, 2027: Upcoming season	Current; Arbana Osmani (3-); Former; Fjoralba Ponari (1); Luana Vjollca (2)
Arab world	الوادي; Al Wadi (Celebrity Format)	LBC	Season 1, 2005: Meshari El Ballam	Karen Derkaloustian
Baltic states	Farmi (Estonia); Ferma (Latvia); Fermos (Lithuania)	TV3	Season 1, 2003: Una Jēkabsone	Marko Matvere; Artūrs Skrastiņš; Kęstutis Jakštas
Belgium; Netherlands	De Farm	vtm Yorin	Season 1, 2005: Matthijs Vegter	Evi Hanssen; Gijs Staverman
Brazil	A Fazenda (Celebrity Format)	RecordTV	Season 1, 2009: Dado Dolabella; Season 2, 2009: Karina Bacchi; Season 3, 2010: Daniel Bueno; Season 4, 2011: Joana Machado; Season 5, 2012: Viviane Araújo; Season 6, 2013: Bárbara Evans; Season 7, 2014: DH Silveira; Season 8, 2015: Douglas Sampaio; Season 9, 2017: Flávia Viana; Season 10, 2018: Rafael Ilha; Season 11, 2019: Lucas Viana; Season 12, 2020: Jojo Todynho; Season 13, 2021: Rico Melquiades; Season 14, 2022: Bárbara Borges; Season 15, 2023: Jaquelline Grohalski; Season 16, 2024: Sacha Bali; Season 17, 2025: Dudu Camargo; Season 18, 2026: Upcoming season	Current; Adriane Galisteu (13–); Former; Britto Junior (1–7); Roberto Justus (8–9); Marcos Mion (10–12)
Brazil	Fazenda de Verão	RecordTV	Season 1, 2012: Angelis Borges	Rodrigo Faro
Bulgaria	Фермата; Fermata	bTV	Season 1, 2015: Raino Uzunov; Season 2, 2016: Stoyan Spasov; Season 3, 2017: Yani Andreev; Season 4, 2018: Deyan Kamenov; Season 5, 2019: Veselka Marinova; Season 6, 2020: Vanya Ilieva; Season 7, 2021: Zhivka Roleva; Season 8, 2022: Veselka Marinova; Season 9, 2023: Kostadin Velkov; Season 10, 2026: Current season	Current; Krasimir Radkov (10–); Stanislava Gancheva (10–); Yonislav Yotov – Toto (10–); Kristin Yotova (10–); Former; Ivan Hristov (1–9); Andrey Arnaudov (1–9); Gergana Guncheva (9)
Chile	La granja	Canal 13	Season 1, 2005: Gonzalo Egas	Sergio Lagos
Chile	La Granja VIP	Canal 13	Season 2, 2005: Javier Estrada	Sergio Lagos
Chile	Granjeras (Only Women's Contestants)	Canal 13	Season 3, 2005: Angélica Sepúlveda	Sergio Lagos
Chile	La Granja	Chilevisión	Season 1, 2026: Upcoming season	
Colombia	La Granja Tolima (Celebrity Format)	Caracol Televisión	Season 1, 2004: Alejandro Pineda; Season 2, 2010: Benjamín Herrera	Alejandro Martínez (1); Paula Jaramillo (1); Natalia París (2); Mauricio Vélez (2)
Croatia	Farma (Celebrity Format: Season 1-3)	Nova TV; Nova BH (Bosnia and Herzegovina) (6-7); Nova M (Montenegro) (6-7)	Season 1, 2008: Rafael Dropulić; Season 2, 2009: Mario Mlinarić; Season 3, 2010: Kristijan Rahimovski; Season 4, 2015: Blaženka Slamar; Season 5, 2016: Goran Kaleb; Season 6, 2018: Saša Vujnović; Season 7, 2020: Tomislav Pavlović	Mia Kovačić (1-7); Dražen Kocijan (2); Nikolina Pišek (2-3); Dušan Bućan (4-5); Davor Dretar "Drele" (1, 3, 6)
Croatia	Farma (Celebrity Format: Season 1-3)	RTL	Season 8, 2025: Ivan Rogić	Nikolina Pišek
Czech Republic	Farma	Nova	Season 1, 2012: Michal Páleník	Tereza Pergnerová
Czech Republic	Farma Česko	Nova	Season 1, 2025: Veronika "Veve" Přikrylová; Season 2, 2026: Lucie Kotenová	Current; Adam Vacula (2-); Former; Vilém Šír (1)
Denmark	Farmen	TV3	Season 1, 2004: Thomas Graa; Season 2, 2005: Natanya Sukkot	Sonny Rønne Pedersen (1); Jakob Kjeldbjerg (2)
Denmark	Hjem til gården	TV2	Season 1, 2017: Trine Cecilie Enevoldsen; Season 2, 2018: Jannie Bager Kristensen; Season 3, 2019: Peter Ole Finnemann Viuff; Season 4, 2020: Kasper Gregersen; Season 5, 2021: Simon Borch Rasmussen	Lene Beier
Dominican Republic	La Finca (Celebrity Format)	Antena Latina	Season 1, 2010: Aquiles Correa	Tania Báez
Finland	Farmi	Nelonen	Season 1, 2014: Sanni Korva	Ellen Jokikunnas
Finland	Farmi Suomi (Celebrity Format)	Nelonen	Season 1, 2020: Noora Räty; Season 2, 2021: Timo Lavikainen; Season 3, 2022: Teemu Packalén; Season 4, 2023: Sampo Kaulanen; Season 5, 2024: Sami Jauhojärvi; Season 6, 2024: Kirsikka Simberg; Season 7, 2025: Lloyd Libiso; Season 8, 2026: Jannica Nordberg	Current; Susanna Laine (3-); Former; Juuso Mäkilähde (1); Ellen Jokikunnas (2)
France	La Ferme Célébrités (Celebrity Format)	TF1	Season 1, 2004: Pascal Olmeta; Season 2, 2005: Jordy Lemoine; Season 3, 2010: Mickael Vendetta	Christophe Dechavanne (1–2); Patrice Carmouze (1–2); Benjamin Castaldi (3); Jean-Pierre Foucault (3)
Germany	Die Farm	RTL	Season 1, 2010: Markus Laurenz	Inka Bause
Greece	Η Φάρμα; I Farma	Mega Channel	Season 1, 2002: Rene Pipitsouli; Season 2, 2004: Giannis Pyrgelis	Grigoris Arnaoutoglou (1); Ilias Balasis (2)
Greece	Η Φάρμα; I Farma	ANT1	Season 3, 2021: Kostas Grekas; Season 4, 2021-22: Neophytos Elias	Sakis Tanimanidis
Greece	Η Φάρμα; I Farma	Star Channel	Season 5, 2023: Giorgos Giannakidis; Season 6, 2024: Maria Giannopoulou; Season 7, 2025: Dimitris Zikos	Leonidas Koutsopoulos
Greece	Η Φάρμα των Επωνύμων; I Farma ton Eponimon (Celebrity Format)	Mega Channel	Season 1, 2003: Stathis Aggelopoulos	Grigoris Arnaoutoglou
Hungary	A Farm	Viasat 3	Season 1, 2002: Laci	László M. Miksa
Hungary	Farm	RTL Klub	Season 2, 2016: Gábor Kiss	Anikó Nádai; Zé Fördős
Hungary	Farm VIP (Celebrity Format)	TV2	Season 1, 2020: Zalán Novák; Season 2, 2021: Holló Fehér; Season 3, 2022: Norbert Schóbert Jr. Season 4, 2023: Simon Szabó; Season 5, 2025: Leo Zsolt Nagy; Season 6, 2026: Current season	Zsolt Gáspár; Zsuzsa Demcsák
India	Farm (Celebrity Format)	Colors	Cancelled	Salman Khan
Ireland	Celebrity Farm	RTÉ One	Season 1, 2004: George McMahon	Mairead McGuinness
Italy	La Fattoria (Celebrity Format)	Italia 1 (1); Canale 5 (2–4)	Season 1, 2004: Danny Quinn; Season 2, 2005: Raffaello Tonon; Season 3, 2006: Rosario Rannisi; Season 4, 2009: Marco Baldini	Daria Bignardi (1); Barbara D'Urso (2–3); Paola Perego (4)
Mexico	La Granja VIP (Celebrity Format)	Azteca Uno; Disney+ (live)	Season 1, 2025: Alfredo Adame; Season 2, 2026: Current season	Adal Ramones; Kristal Silva
Norway	Farmen	TV 2	Season 1, 2001: Gaute Grøtta Grav; Season 2, 2003: Bjørn Tore Bekkeli; Season 3, 2004: Snorre Rotbæk; Season 4, 2007: Mikkel Isak Eira; Season 5, 2008: Silje Hvarnes; Season 6, 2010: Leif Birger Mækinen; Season 7, 2011: Tommy Rodahl; Season 8, 2012: Ingvild Skare Thygesen; Season 9, 2013: Morten Heggdal; Season 10, 2014: Magnhild Vik; Season 11, 2015: Eilev Bjerkerud; Season 12, 2016: Laila Lockert; Season 13, 2017: Halvor Sveen; Season 14, 2018: Tonje Frøystad Garvik; Season 15, 2019: Erik Rotihaug; Season 16, 2020: Per Gunvald Haugen; Season 17, 2021: Daniel Godø; Season 18, 2022: Henrik Eijsink; Season 19, 2023: Anders Rydning; Season 20, 2024: Heidi Lereng; Season 21, 2026: Current season	Current; Victor Sotberg (21-); Former; Sarah Natasha Melbye (1); Frithjof Wilborn (2); Gaute Grøtta Grav (3–15); Mads Hansen (16–17); Niklas Baarli (18-20)
Norway	Farmen kjendis (Celebrity Format)	TV 2	Season 1, 2017: Leif Einar Lothe; Season 2, 2018: Pål Anders Ullevålseter; Season 3, 2019: Tiril Sjåstad Christiansen; Season 4, 2020: Erik Alfred Tesaker; Season 5, 2021: Lasse Matberg; Season 6, 2022: Isak Dreyer; Season 7, 2023: Trond Moi; Season 8, 2024: Sondre Mulongo Nystrøm; Season 9, 2025: Kjersti Grini; Season 10, 2026: Sondre Sundby	Current; Dorthe Skappel (8-); Former; Gaute Grøtta Grav (1–3); Tiril Sjåstad Christiansen (4-7)
Peru	La granja VIP (Celebrity Format)	Panamericana Televisión	Season 1, 2026: Shirley Arica	Ethel Pozo; Yaco Eskenazi
Poland	Farma	Polsat	Season 1, 2022: Kuba "Wojna" Wojnowski; Season 2, 2023: Tomasz Wędzony; Season 3, 2024: Angelika Kałużna; Season 4, 2025: Bronisław "Bandi" Bandyk; Season 5, 2026: Aksel Rumenov; Season 6, 2027: Upcoming season	Marcelina Zawadzka; Ilona Krawczyńska; Milena Krawczyńska (4-)
Portugal	Quinta das Celebridades (Celebrity Format)	TVI	Season 1, 2004: José Castelo Branco; Season 2, 2005: Rute Marques	Júlia Pinheiro; José Pedro Vasconcelos
Portugal	A Quinta (with celebrities and anonymous)	TVI	Season 3, 2015: Kelly Medeiros	Teresa Guilherme
Portugal	A Quinta: O Desafio (Reality All-Stars format)	TVI	Season 1, 2016: Luís Nascimento	Teresa Guilherme
Portugal	Era Uma Vez na Quinta (Anonymous format)	SIC	Season 1, 2024: Rita Caldeira	Andreia Rodrigues
Romania	Ferma vedetelor (1–3) (Celebrity Format) Ferma (4–5) (Celebrity Format)	Pro TV	Season 1, 2015: George Vintilă; Season 2, 2016: Paul Ipate; Season 3, 2018: Tania Popa; Season 4, 2019: Marius Crăciun; Season 5, 2020: Augustin Viziru	Iulia Vântur (1–2); Monica Bîrlădeanu (3); Mihaela Rădulescu (4–5)
Serbia; Bosnia and Herzegovina; Montenegro	Farma (Celebrity Format)	RTV Pink; Pink BH; Pink M Narodna TV	Season 1, 2009: Milan Topalović Topalko; Season 2, 2010: Miloš Bojanić; Season 3, 2010: Katarina Živković; Season 4, 2013: Sulejman Haljevac Memo; Season 5, 2013: Jelena Golubović; Season 6, 2015: Stanija Dobrojević; Season 7, 2016: Jelena Golubović; Season 8, 2024-25: Kristijan Golubović	Aleksandra Jeftanović (1–6); Dušica Jakovljević (6–8); Ognjen Amidžić (Seasons 1–8); Katarina Nikolić (Seasons 7–8); Vladimir Stanojević (7–8); Milica Kon (8)
Slovakia	Farma	Markíza	Season 1, 2011: Andrea Járová; Season 2, 2012: Radomír Spireng; Season 3, 2012: Mário Drobný; Season 4, 2013: Pavol Styk; Season 5, 2014: Lenka Švaralová; Season 6, 2015: Tomáš Mayer; Season 7, 2016: Tomáš Mrva; Season 8, 2017: Miroslav Povec; Season 9, 2017: Šimon Néma; Season 10, 2018: Dominik Porubský; Season 11, 2019: Gabriel Sedláček; Season 12, 2020: Xénia Gregušová; Season 13, 2021: Miroslav Debnár; Season 14, 2022: Filip Jánoš; Season 15, 2023: Lucia Gašparíková; Season 16, 2024: Peter Janiga; Season 17, 2025: Roman Perašín; Season 18, 2026: Current season	Current; Marek Fašiang (14-); Former; Kveta Horváthová (1–9); Eva Evelyn Kramerová (10-13)
Slovenia	Kmetija	POP TV	Season 1, 2007: Daša Hliš; Season 2, 2008: Cirila Jeršin; Season 4, 2011: Matej Drečnik; Season 8, 2017: Milena Žižek; Season 9, 2018: Franko Bajc; Season 10, 2019: Jan Klobasa & Tilen Klobasa; Season 11, 2021: Tilen Brglez; Season 12, 2022: Tom Zupan; Season 13, 2023: Žan Simonič; Season 14, 2024: Tim Novak; Season 15, 2026: Aleksandra April; Season 16, 2027: Upcoming season	Current; Natalija Bratkovič (7-); Former; Špela Močnik (1–2); Lili Žagar (3); Saša Lendero (4–5); Jasna Kuljaj (6)
Slovenia	Kmetija: Nov začetek	Planet TV	Season 5, 2014: Denis Toplak; Season 6, 2015: Fahrudin "Faki" Čaušević; Season 7, 2016: Adriana Košenina	Current; Natalija Bratkovič (7-); Former; Špela Močnik (1–2); Lili Žagar (3); Saša Lendero (4–5); Jasna Kuljaj (6)
Slovenia	Kmetija Slavnih (Celebrity Format)	POP TV	Season 3, 2009: Goran Breščanski	Anja Križnik Tomažin
Spain	La Granja (Celebrity Format)	Antena 3	Season 1, 2004: Loreto Valverde; Season 2, 2005: Miguel Ángel Redondo	Terelu Campos
Spain	Acorralados (Celebrity Format)	Telecinco; La Siete	Season 1, 2011: Nagore Robles	Jorge Javier Vázquez
Spain	Pesadilla en El Paraíso (Celebrity Format)	Telecinco	Season 1, 2022: Víctor Janeiro; Season 2, 2023: Borja Estrada	Lara Álvarez; Carlos Sobera
Sweden	Farmen	TV4	Season 1, 2001: Benny Viberg; Season 2, 2002: Inger Andersson; Season 3, 2003: Veronika Larsson; Season 4, 2004: Pia Flodner; Season 5, 2004: Christian Gergils; Season 6, 2013: Erik Persson; Season 7, 2014: Maria Dahlberg; Season 8, 2015: Örjan Selien; Season 9, 2016: Fredrik Rosenkvist; Season 10, 2017: Niklas Ravnestam; Season 11, 2018: Stefan Eriksson; Season 12, 2019: Tobias Möller; Season 13, 2020: Sofie Hodén; Season 14, 2021: Daniel Tholén; Season 15, 2022: Cecilia Ahlborg; Season 16, 2023: Nebil Davidsson; Season 17, 2024: Levin Larsson; Season 18, 2025: Mikael Andersson; Season 19, 2026: Alexander Söderholm; Season 20, 2027: Upcoming season	Current; Carolina Gynning (20-); Former; Hans Fahlén (1–2); Linda Lindorff (3–4, 6–7); Filippa Lagerbäck (5); Paolo Roberto (8–13); Anna Brolin (14–19)
Sweden	Farmen VIP (Celebrity Format)	TV4	Season 1, 2018: Glenn Hysén; Season 2, 2019: Sigrid Bernson	Paolo Roberto
Turkey	Ünlüler Çiftliği (Celebrity Format)	ATV	Season 1, 2004: Not known Season 2, 2004: Not known Season 3, 2004: Not known	Seray Sever
United Kingdom	The Farm (Celebrity Format)	Five	Season 1, 2004: Jeff Brazier; Season 2, 2005: Keith Harris & Orville the Duck	Ed Hall (1); Colin McAllister (2); Justin Ryan (2)
United Kingdom	Celebs on the Farm (Celebrity Format)	5Star (1–2); MTV (3)	Season 1, 2018: Gleb Savchenko; Celebs on the Ranch, 2019: Louie Spence; Season 2, 2019: Paul Merson; Season 3, 2021: Kerry Katona	Stephen Bailey

== Fear Factor ==
Original name: Now or Neverland
Origin: Netherlands
Date started: 1998
Creator: John de Mol
First network to broadcast: Veronica
First country to adapt: U.S.
Country with the most seasons: UK

Currently airing franchise
Franchise with an upcoming season
Franchise that has an unknown status
Franchise that has suspended production
Franchise that has ended

Country	Name	Host(s)	Channel	Broadcast	Jackpot
Albania	Fear Factor		Vizion Plus		
Arab world	Fear Factor تحدى الخوف	Najla Badr & Ibrahim Abu Jawdeh	MBC1	February 13, 2004	50.000 SR
Argentina	Factor Miedo	David Kavlin	Telefe	2003	
Australia	Fear Factor Australia	Marc Yellin	Nine Network	2002	A$50.000
Belgium	Fear Factor	Walter Grootaers	VTM	2005	
Belgium	Fear Factor	Alex Agnew	Play 4	November 15, 2022	TBA
Brazil	Hipertensão	Zeca Camargo (2002); Glenda Kozlowski (2010–11)	Globo	April 14, 2002 – October 27, 2011	R$500,000
Bulgaria	Страх	Atanas Mihailov	Nova Television	2009–11	15.000 лв
Canada	Facteur de Risques	Benoit Gagnon, Josée Lavigueur	TVA	September 21, 2004	CAN$30,000
Canada	Fear Factor Célébrités	Patrick Huard	Crave	June 5, 2026	TBA
Chile	Fear Factor Chile	Tonka Tomicic	Canal 13	November 13, 2010	CL$3.000.000
Colombia	Frente al miedo	Juan Pablo Llano	Caracol TV	2005	
Croatia	Fear Factor	Antonija Blaće	RTL		
Czech Republic	Faktor strachu	Tomas Matonoha	Prima Cool	2009	
Denmark	Fear Factor	Biker-Jens	TV 3	2003	TBA
Denmark	Fear Factor	Ruben Søltoft	TV 2 Echo	December 20, 2025	TBA
Dominican Republic	Enfrentando al Miedo	Irving Alverti	Telesistema 11	December 12, 2006	RD$20.000.000
Egypt	Fear Factor Extreme أرض الخوف	Sally Chahin	Al Hayat TV	April 2009	US$50,000
Finland	Pelkokerroin	Aleksi Valavuori	Nelonen	September 13, 2008	€10,000
France	Fear Factor France	Denis Brogniart	TF1	2003–04	€10,000
Germany	Fear Factor	Sonja Zietlow	RTL	2004	
Greece	Fear Factor	Kostas Sommer	ANT1	June 2006	
Hungary	A Rettegés Foka	Kovalcsik Ildikó(Lilu)	RTL Klub	2005	5.000.000 Ft
India	Fear Factor India	Mukul Dev	SET Asia	10 March 2006	
India	Fear Factor: Khatron Ke Khiladi	Akshay Kumar (2008–09; 2011); Priyanka Chopra (2010); Rohit Shetty (2014-15, 2017-); Arjun Kapoor (2016)	Colors	July 21, 2008	
India	Fear Factor: Khatron Ke Khiladi - Made in India	Farah Khan; Rohit Shetty	Colors	August 1, 2020	
Indonesia	Fear Factor Indonesia	Agastya Kandau	RCTI	November 19, 2005	Rp.50.000.000
Italy	Fear Factor	Paolo Ruffini	GXT and Italia 2	October 2005 – June 2013	
Malaysia	Fear Factor Malaysia	Shamser Sidhu; Aaron Aziz (Astor Ria and Maya HD)	NTV7; Astro Ria; Astro Maya HD	August 27, 2005; February 15, 2014 (Upcoming season's): Astro Ria; Astro Maya HD	RM10.000; RM320,000 (Astro Ria and Maya HD)
Malaysia	Fear Factor Selebriti Malaysia	Aaron Aziz	Astro Ria and Astro Mustika HD	December 29, 2012	
Mexico	Fear Factor: Factor Miedo	Julio Bracho (2002–04) "El Rasta" (2004–05, 2010)	Televisa	2002, Fear Factor Vip 2010	MX$150.000
Netherlands	Now or Neverland	Fabienne de Vries	Veronica	1998	fl 20 000 €8 000
Netherlands	Fear Factor	Fabienne de Vries	Veronica / V8	2002-2004	
Norway	Fear Factor		TV 3	2002	
Pakistan	Madventures Pakistan	Ahsan Khan (2013); Ahmad Ali Butt (2015)	ARY Digital	2013 – present	
Philippines	Pinoy Fear Factor	Ryan Agoncillo	ABS-CBN	November 10, 2008 – February 20, 2009	P2.000.000
Poland	Fear Factor – Nieustraszeni	Roman Polko	Polsat	October 8, 2004 – December 3, 2004	50,000 zł
Portugal	Fear Factor – Desafio Total	Leonor Poeiras; José Carlos Araújo	Televisão Independente	2004	
Romania	Pariu cu Frica – Fear Factor		Sport.ro	April 6, 2008	
Russia	Фактор страха	Vladimir Turchinsky (2003–2004); Kirill Nabutov (2005); Anatoly Tsoy (2021)	NTV	2003–2005, 2021	100.000 ₽
Russia	Фактор страха	Alexey Chadov	STS	2023	300.000 ₽
South Africa	Fear Factor Africa	Colin Moss; Thapelo Mokoena; Lungile Radu	M-Net e.tv	2002; 2006–07	R300,000
Spain	Factor Miedo	Alonso Caparros	Antena 3	2005	
Sweden	Fear Factor Sweden	Paolo Roberto	TV3	2002	
Turkey	Fear Factor Türkiye	Acun Ilıcalı	Show TV	2006	TL 100.000
Turkey	Fear Factor Extreme	Asuman Krause	Star TV	2009	TL 100.000
Turkey	Fear Factor Extreme 2	Asuman Krause	Star TV	2010	TL 100.000
Turkey	Fear Factor Aksiyon	Asuman Krause	Fox Turkey	2013	TL 100.000
United Kingdom	Fear Factor UK	Ed Sanders	Sky1	Series 1: 3 September 2002 – 26 November 2002; Series 2: 18 September 2003 – 11 December 2003; Celebrity Series: 18 July 2004 – 22 August 2004	£20,000
United States	Fear Factor	Joe Rogan	NBC	June 11, 2001 – September 12, 2006	US$50,000
United States	Fear Factor	Joe Rogan	NBC	December 12, 2011 – July 16, 2012	US$50,000
United States	Fear Factor	Ludacris	MTV	May 30, 2017 – August 21, 2018	US$50,000
United States	Fear Factor: House of Fear	Johnny Knoxville	Fox	January 14, 2026	US$200,000

== Flip or Flop ==
Original name: Flip or Flop
Origin: USA
Date started: April 16, 2013
First network to broadcast: HGTV
Related series: Flip or Flop, Flip or Flop Atlanta, Flip or Flop Chicago, Flip or Flop Follow-Up, Flip or Flop Nashville, Flip or Flop Fort Worth, Flip or Flop Vegas

== Got Talent ==
Original name: America's Got Talent
Origin: United States
Date started: June 21, 2006
Note: Britain's Got Talent was originally slated to be the first to be made but due to problems in production, America's Got Talent was eventually made first.
Creator: Simon Cowell
First network to broadcast: NBC
First country to adapt: France
Country with the most seasons: United States

Legend:

Franchise with a currently airing season
Franchise with an upcoming season
Franchise with an unknown status
Franchise that was cancelled during production
Franchise that has ended

=== Main series ===
Country/region	Local name	Network	Premiere	Host(s)	Judges	Seasons and winners
Africa	L'Afrique a un Incroyable Talent	RTI; ORTB; ORTM	14 October 2016	Konnie Touré; Daouda Sane	Claudia Tagbo; Fally Ipupa; Angélique Kidjo	Season 1, 2016: Two Brothers Sylla (acrobats); Season 2, 2017: Strauss Serpent (21-year-old contortionist)
Albania; Kosovo	Albanians Got Talent	Top Channel	25 August 2010	Albana Osmani; Benet Kaci	Altin Basha; Rovena Dilo; Armend Rexhepagiqi	Season 1, 2010: Fiqiri Luli & Sabrina Troushku (circus dancers)
Albania; Kosovo	Albania's Got Talent	Vizion Plus	11 November 2024	Isli Islami	Current; Adelina Ismaili; Agron Llakaj; Kastro Zizo; Elsa Lila (2–); Former; Ledina Çelo (1–2)	Season 1, 2024–25: Tristan Cela (14-year-old singer); Season 2, 2025–26: Nikolas Bushi (performing); Season 3, 2026: Upcoming season
Arab world	Arabs Got Talent	MBC	14 January 2011	Current; Raya Abirached; Former; Qusai Kheder (1–6)	Current; Ali Jaber; Najwa Karam; Nasser Al Qasabi (2–4, 7–); Bassem Youssef (7–); Former; Amr Adeeb (1); Ahmed Helmy (3–6)	Season 1, 2011: Amr Qatamesh (stand-up satirical poetry); Season 2, 2012: Khawater Al-Zalam (glow-in-the-dark); Season 3, 2013: Sima group (artistic dance); Season 4, 2014–15: Salah Benlemqawanssa (35-year-old popper/b-boy); Season 5, 2017: Emanne Beasha (8-year-old opera singer); Season 6, 2019: Mayyas (mainly female dance troupe); Season 7, 2024: Mandalab (dance-troupe); Season 8, TBA: Awaiting confirmation
Argentina	Talento Argentino	Telefe	27 July 2008	Mariano Peluffo	Cesar 'Kike' Teruel; Maximiliano Guerra; Catherine Fulop	Season 1, 2008: Martin Bustos (25-year-old comedian/impersonator); Season 2, 2009: Daniel Ferreyra (39-year-old guitarist); Season 3, 2010–11: Diego Gutierrez (23-year-old button accordion player)
Argentina	Got Talent Argentina	Telefe	21 August 2023	Lizy Tagliani	Abel Pintos; Emir Abdul; Florencia Peña; La Joaqui	Season 1, 2023: Matías and Johanna Ortíz (dancers)
Armenia	Թաքնված տաղանդ Taqnvats taghand	Shant TV	2009	Grigor Aghakhanyan	Violet Grigoryan; Sergei Danielian; Nikolai Tsaturyan (1)^{†} Artyom Yerkanyan (2)	Season 1, 2009: Samvel Davtyan (singer); Season 2, 2010: Samvel Harutyunyan (singer)
Armenia	Got Talent Հայաստան	Shant TV	8 March 2026	Vahe Ziroyan; Gohar Gasparyan	Tigran Gyulumyan; Vika Martirosyan; André; Sona Sarkisyan	Season 1, 2026: Tigran Mkrtchyan (14-year-old musician)
Asia (Note: Joint version with India, Indonesia, Malaysia, Philippines, Singapore, Thailand, Vietnam and other more Asian countries, taking part)	Asia's Got Talent	AXN Asia	12 March 2015	Marc Nelson (1); Rovilson Fernandez (1); Alan Wong (2–3); Justin Bratton (2–3)	David Foster; Anggun; Melanie C (1); Vanness Wu (1); Jay Park (2–3)	Season 1, 2015: El Gamma Penumbra (shadow play group); Season 2, 2017: The Sacred Riana (25-year-old spooky magician); Season 3, 2019: Eric Chien (26-year-old close-up magician)
Australia	Australia's Got Talent	Seven Network (1–6, 9–10); Nine Network (7–8)	18 February 2007	Grant Denyer (1–6); Julia Morris (7); Dave Hughes (8); Ricki-Lee Coulter (9–10)	Red Symons (1–3); Tom Burlinson (1–3); Dannii Minogue (1–6); Brian McFadden (4–6); Kyle Sandilands (4–7); Dawn French (7); Geri Halliwell (7); Timomatic (7); Ian Dickson (8); Sophie Monk (8); Kelly Osbourne (8); Eddie Perfect (8); Lucy Durack (9); Nicole Scherzinger (9); Manu Feildel (9); Shane Jacobson (9–10); Alesha Dixon (10); Kate Ritchie (10); David Walliams (10)	Season 1, 2007: Bonnie Anderson (12-year-old singer); Season 2, 2008: "Smokin" Joe Robinson (16-year-old guitarist); Season 3, 2009: Mark Vincent (15-year-old opera singer); Season 4, 2010: Justice Crew (dance troupe); Season 5, 2011: Jack Vidgen (14-year-old singer); Season 6, 2012: Andrew De Silva (37-year-old singer); Season 7, 2013: Uncle Jed (Funk/Soul/Jazz/Reggae band); Season 8, 2016: Fletcher Pilon (15-year-old singer); Season 9, 2019: Kristy Sellars (33-year-old pole dancer); Season 10, 2022: Acromazing (acrobatic group)
Azerbaijan	Özünü Tanıt; Ozunu Tanit	ATV	February 2015	Aygun Akif; Elgun Huseynov	Murad Dadaşov; Aygün Kazımova; ABD Malik	Season 1, 2015: Elkhan Mammadov (magician)
Belgium	Supertalent in Vlaanderen (in Dutch)	VIER	15 March 2007	Dré Steemans^{†} Ann Van Elsen	Paul Jambers; Martine Prenen^{†} Gert Verhulst	Season 1, 2007: Triple E (singing trio sisters)
Belgium	Belgium's Got Talent (in Dutch)	VTM	10 September 2012	Koen Wauters; Laura Tesoro (4–7)	Ray Cokes (1–3); Karen Damen (1–3); Rob Vanoudenhoven (1–3); Niels Destadsbader (3–5; studioshows, 6); An Lemmens (4–7); Dan Karaty (4–6); Stan Van Samang (4–6); Jens Dendoncker (auditions, 6); Bart Peeters (7); Ruth Beeckmans (7); Davy Parmentier (7)	Season 1, 2012: Karolien Goris (11-year-old singer); Season 2, 2013: Michael Lanzo (34-year-old singer); Season 3, 2015: Domenico Vaccaro (22-year-old pole dancer); Season 4, 2016: Baba Yega (dance troupe); Season 5, 2018: Tascha & Ian (dancers); Season 6, 2019: Benjamin Ceyssens (19-year-old pianist); Season 7, 2021: De Mini Droids (dance troupe)
Belgium	Belgium's Got Talent (in French)	RTL-TVI	10 September 2012	Julie Taton; Jean-Michel Zecca	Maureen Dor; Carlos Vaquera; Paul Ambach	Season 1, 2012: 2 Mad (dance troupe); Season 2, 2013: Junbox (20-year-old dancer)
Belgium & Netherlands	Got Talent	VTM; RTL 4	4 September 2026	Chantal Janzen; Koen Wauters	Dan Karaty; Karen Damen; Marc-Marie Huijbregts; Soundos El Ahmadi; James Cooke	Season 1, 2026: Current season
Brazil	Got Talent Brasil	Record (1); SBT (2–)	2 April 2013	Current; Ratinho (2–); Former; Rafael Cortez (1)	Current; TBA (2–); TBA (2–); TBA (2–); Former; Milton Cunha (1); Daniela Cicarelli (1); Sidney Magal (1)	Season 1, 2013: Domingues da Palha (45-year-old coconut leaf musician); Season 2, 2026: Upcoming season
Bulgaria	България търси талант Balgariya tarsi talant	bTV	1 March 2010	Maria Ignatova (1–2); Aleksandra Raeva (1–2); Maria Silvestar (3–5); Aleksandar Kadiev (4, 6–9); Daniel Petkanov (6–8); Petar Antonov (9)	Magarditch Halvadjian (1; auditions, 2); Hilda Kazasyan (1–2); Lyuben Dilov Jr. (1–3, 5–6; auditions, 7)^{†} Krasimir Radkov (live shows, 2); Asen Blatechki (3, 5); Vanya Tsvetkova (3); Esil Duran (3); Darina Pavlova (4); Ivo Siromahov (4); Nikolai Iliev (4); Iliana Benovska (auditions and semi-finals, 4); Desi Dobreva (semi-finals and final, 4); Mihaela Fileva (5); Itso Hazarta (5–7); Katerina Evro (6–9); Slavena Vatova (6–7); Lyubomir Neikov (live shows, 7); Nikolaos Tsitiridis (8–9); Evelyn Kostova (8); Todor Kantardzhiev (8); Galena (9); Julian Vergov (9)	Season 1, 2010: Bogdana Petrova (17-year-old visually impaired singer); Season 2, 2012: Kristina Arabadzhieva (12-year-old singer); Season 3, 2014: Thomas Tomov (17-year-old opera singer); Season 4, 2015: Plamen Lyubenov (20-year-old wheelchair breakdancer); Season 5, 2016: Vivo Montana (18–44-year-old musical band); Season 6, 2019: Adriyan Asenov (31-year-old blind imitator); Season 7, 2021: Kaloyan Geshev (10-year-old mental calculator); Season 8, 2022: Stefan Ivanov (6-year-old bagpiper); Season 9, 2025: Konstantin Chervenkov (10-year-old mental calculator)
Cambodia	Cambodia's Got Talent	Hang Meas HDTV	30 November 2014	Nhem Sokun (1); Pen Chamrong (1); Chea Vibol (2); San Visal (3)	Preap Sovath (1–2); Khat Sokhim; Neay Koy; Neay Krem (2–3); Chea Vibol (3)	Season 1, 2014–15: Yoeun Pisey (15-year-old blind singer); Season 2, 2018: The King (dance group); Season 3, 2023: MJM (dance group)
Canada	Canada's Got Talent (in English)	Citytv	4 March 2012	Lindsay Ell (2–5); Dina Pugliese (1)	Stephan Moccio (1); Measha Brueggergosman (1); Martin Short (1); Lilly Singh (2–4); Trish Stratus (2–4); Howie Mandel (2–5); Kardinal Offishall (2–5); Shania Twain (5); Katherine Ryan (5)	Season 1, 2012: Sagkeeng's Finest (tap dance troupe); Season 2, 2022: Jeanick Fournier (48-year-old singer); Season 3, 2023: Conversion (dance group); Season 4, 2024: Rebecca Strong (20-year-old singer); Season 5, 2025: Jacob Lewis (34-year-old singer)
Canada	Canadian Family's Got Talent	Citytv	27 April 2020	Dina Pugliese; Devo Brown	Simon Cowell	Season 1, 2020: CZN (singing trio)
Canada	Quel talent!(in French)	Noovo	9 September 2024	Marie-Josée Gauvin	Rachid Badouri; Anne Dorval; Marie-Mai; Serge Denoncourt	Season 1, 2024: Stardust (dance troupe); Season 2, 2025: Jerry Tremblay (comedian and acrobat)
Central Asia (Note: Joint version with Kazakhstan, Kyrgyzstan, Tajikistan, and Uzbekistan taking part)	Central Asia's Got Talent	Khabar (1); Kyrgyz Television; TV Safina; Zo'r TV (1); NTK (2); Sevimli TV (2); Xəzər TV (2)	15 September 2019	Bekhruz Nasriddinov (1); Kumar Lukmanov (1); Timur Aliyev (1); Yerkebulan Myrzabek (1); Erkin Ryskulbekov; Akkenzhe Alimzhan (2); Begzod Abdusamatov (2); Zarina Rahimi (2); Leyla Aliyeva (2)	Alovuddin Abdullayev (1)^{†} Gulnur Satylganova (1); Nurlan Abdullin (1); Sitora Farmonova; Serik Akishev (2); Yerbolat Zhanabylov (2)	Season 1, 2019: Chorshanbe Alovatov (22-year-old singer); Season 2, 2022: Moranbon (dance group)
Chile	Talento Chileno	Chilevisión	27 September 2010	Julián Elfenbein (1); Rafael Araneda (2–3); Eva Gómez (4–6)	Antonio Vodanovic; Rodrigo Díaz (1–3); Francisca García-Huidobro (1–3); Carolina de Moras (4–6); Bombo Fica (4–6)	Season 1, 2010: Camila Silva (16-year-old singer); Season 2, 2011: Ignacio Venegas (23-year-old singer); Season 3, 2012: Susana Sáez (35-year-old singer); Season 4, 2013: Carolina and Felipe (tango dancers); Season 5, 2014: Hugo Macaya (38-year-old blind singer); Season 6, 2015: Cristofer Mera (19-year-old singer) & Samsara (band)
Chile	Got Talent Chile	Mega	12 March 2021	María José Quintanilla; Karla Constant	Carolina Arregui; Sergio Freire; Luis Gnecco; Denise Rosenthal	Season 1, 2021: Juliana Ángel González (13-year-old singer)
China (Note: Includes the special administrative regions of Hong Kong and Macau)	中国达人秀; China's Got Talent pinyin: Zhōngguó Dárén Xiù lit: China Talent Show	DragonTV; Xing Kong	25 July 2010	Cao Kefan (1); Yang Lan (2); Cheng Lei (1–6)	Zhou Libo (1–3); Gao Xiaosong (1–4); Annie Yi (1–4); Chen Yiu-Chuen (2); Yang Lan (2); Huang Shu-chun (2–4); Ni Ping (3); Cui Yongyuan (3); Liu Wei (3); Huang Doudou (3–4); Dou Wentao (4); Xu Jinglei (4); Leon Lai Ming (4); Yang Wei (4); Ying Da (4); Zhao Wei (5); Liu Ye (5); Su You-peng (5); Wang Wei-chung (5); Yang Mi (6); Shen Teng (6); Jin Xing (6); Cai Guoqing (6); Yue Yunpeng (6)	Season 1, 2010: Liu Wei (23-year-old armless pianist); Season 2, 2011: Zhuo Jun (19-year-old popper); Season 3, 2011–12: Pan Qianqian (24-year-old female baritone singer); Season 4, 2012–13: Wang Jungru (17-year-old contortionist); Season 5, 2013–14: Yin Zhonghua (acrobat); Season 6, 2019: Shi Zheyuan (39-year-old drone performer)
China	点赞！达人秀; Talent pinyin: Diǎnzàn! Dárén Xiù lit: Thumbs Up! Talent Show	Jiangsu Television; Douyin	31 Oct 2021	Zhang Chunye	Meng Fei; Nicholas Tse; G.E.M. Annie Yi	Season 1, 2021: Zhu Qiaoyan (acrobat)
Colombia	Colombia Tiene Talento	Canal RCN	6 February 2012	Santiago Rodríguez; Eva Rey (2)	Paola Turbay; Alejandra Azcarate; Manolo Cardona (1); José Gaviria (2)	Season 1, 2012: Paolo Alexander González (24-year-old pianist); Season 2, 2013: Byron González (19-year-old speed painter)
Croatia; Bosnia and Herzegovina; Montenegro	Supertalent	Nova TV; Nova BH (6–); Nova M (6–)	25 September 2009	Rene Bitorajac (1–6); Igor Mešin; Frano Ridjan (7–)	Current; Martina Tomčić (4–); Maja Šuput (5–); Davor Bilman (5–); Fabijan Pavao Medvešek (9–); Former; Nina Badrić (1–3); Enis Bešlagić (1–3); Dubravko Merlić (1–3); Danijela Martinović (4); Mario Petreković (4); Mislav Čavajda (4); Janko Popović Volarić (5–8)	Season 1, 2009: Tihomir Bendelja (15-year-old gymnastics twirler); Season 2, 2010: Viktorija Novosel (21-year-old singer); Season 3, 2011: Promenada Klub (shadow theatre); Season 4, 2016: Petar Bruno Basić (23-year-old pole dancer); Season 5, 2017: Emil & Mateja (dancing duo); Season 6, 2018: Denis Barta (20-year-old blind and autistic singer); Season 7, 2019: Transform Crew (dancing troupe); Season 8, 2021: Anatacha Filimone (18-year-old singer); Season 9, 2022: Magic Leon (27-year-old illusionist); Season 10, 2023: Chritzel Renae Aceveda (12-year-old singer); Season 11, 2024: Tamia Šeme (25-year-old acrobat); Season 12, 2025: Duo Turkeev & Kids (acrobatic troupe)
Czech Republic & Slovakia	Česko Slovensko má talent	TV JOJ; JOJ Family (6–); TV Prima (1–5, 7–)	29 August 2010	Current; David Gránský (7–); Jasmina Alagič (9–); Former; Martin "Pyco" Rausch (1–4); Jakub Prachař (1–4); Marcel Forgáč (5–6); Milan Junior Zimnýkoval (5–6); Lujza Garajová-Schrameková (7–8)	Current; Jaro Slávik; Diana Mórová (5–); Jakub Prachař (5–); Marta Jandová (7–); Leoš Mareš (4, 12–); Former; Jan Kraus (1); Lucie Bílá (1–6); Martin Dejdar (2–3)	Season 1, 2010: DaeMen (hand-to-hand acrobatics); Season 2, 2011: Atai Omurzakov (21-year-old dancer); Season 3, 2012: Jozef Pavlusík (24-year-old opera singer); Season 4, 2013: Miroslav Sýkora (25-year-old opera singer); Season 5, 2015: Gyöngyi Bodišová (22-year-old singer); Season 6, 2016: Act 4 Slovakia (acrobatic on bicycles); Season 7, 2018: Nikoleta Šurinová (11-year-old drummer); Season 8, 2019: Margaréta Ondrejková (16-year-old singer); Season 9, 2021: Diamonds (dance group); Season 10, 2022: Nikola Kusendová (18-year-old singer); Season 11, 2023: Anna Slížová (24-year-old singer); Season 12, 2024: Silvia Vršková (47-year-old aerialist); Season 13, TBA: Awaiting confirmation
Denmark	Talent	DR1	15 August 2008	Mikkel Herforth (1); Felix Schmidt (1–3)	Martin Hall (1); Julie Steincke (1); Peter Aalbæk Jensen (1); Jesper Dahl (2–3); Hella Joof (2–3); Nikolaj Koppel (2–3)	Season 1, 2008: Robot Boys (robot dancing duo); Season 2, 2009: Kalle Pimp (23-year-old rapper); Season 3, 2010: Copenhagen Drummers (military drummers)
Denmark	Danmark Har Talent	TV2	2014	Christopher Læssø (1–4); Felix Schmidt (1–4); Rasmus Brohave (5); Cecilie Haugaard (5)	Jarl Friis-Mikkelsen (1–4); Cecilie Lassen (1–4); Peter Frödin (1–5); TopGunn (1); Nabiha (2–3); Thomas Buttenschøn (4); Signe Lindkvist (5); Simon Jul (5); Sus Wilkins (5)	Season 1, 2014–15: Thor Mikkelsen (17-year-old beatboxer); Season 2, 2015–16: Matias Rasmussen (23-year-old Rubik's Cube solver); Season 3, 2017: Johanne Astrid (10-year-old Drummer); Season 4, 2018: Moonlight Brothers (brothers dance duo); Season 5, 2019: Alex Porsing (24-year-old FMX rider)
Dominican Republic	Dominicana's Got Talent	Color Visión	4 September 2019	Current; Enrique Quailey (3–); Lorenna Pierre (3–); Former; Frank Perozo (1); Pamela Sued (1); Francisco Vásquez (2); Karina Larrauri (2)	Current; Nashla Bogaert; Waddys Jaquez; Pamela Sued (2–); Irving Alberti (3–); Former; Raymond Pozo (1–2); Milagros Germán (1)	Season 1, 2019: Francis 'Babyrotty' Campusano (13-year-old singer); Season 2, 2020–21: Keren Montero (14-year-old singer); Season 3, 2025–26: Da Republik Junior (dance group)
East Africa	East Africa's Got Talent	Citizen TV; Clouds Media; RTV; NBS TV	4 August 2019	Anne Kansiime	Gaetano Kagwa; Vanessa Mdee; Makeda; Jeff Koinange	Season 1, 2019: Esther and Ezekiel (brother-and-sister singing duo)
Ecuador	Ecuador Tiene Talento	Ecuavisa	25 March 2012	Nicolas Espinoza (1); Bianca Salame (1); Henry Bustamante (2); Jonathan Estrada (2–6)	Diego Spotorno (1–2); Karla Kanora (1); Jaime Enrique Aymara (1); Maria Fernanda Rios (2–4); Wendy Vera (2–5 (auditions); Paola Farias (2–5); Fabrizio Ferretti (3); Fernando Villarroel (4–5); Carolina Jaume (5); Francisco Pinoargotti (5 (semi-finals onwards); Lila Flores (6); Ángelo Barahona (6); Carolina Aguirre (6); Martín Guerrero (6)	Season 1, 2012: Luis Castillo (37-year-old street comedian); Season 2, 2013: José Fernando Lara (26-year-old singer); Season 3, 2014: Ledesma Brothers (foldclore singers); Season 4, 2015: Christian Loaiza (30-year-old singer); Season 5, 2016: CAN Group (Talented police dogs); Season 6, 2017: Juventud Bolivarense (young music trio)
Estonia	Eesti talent	TV3	9 October 2010	Eda-Ines Etti; Tanel Padar	Kristiina Heinmets-Aigro; Valdo Randpere; Mihkel Raud	Season 1, 2010–11: Erki-Andres Nuut (21-year-old leaf instrument player)
Finland	Talent Suomi	Nelonen (1–5); MTV3 (6–7)	1 October 2007	Susanna Laine (1); Martti Vannas (1); Jarkko Valtee (2–3); Osku Heiskanen (2–3); Lorenz Backman (4); Sebastian Rejman (4); Heikki Paasonen (5); Elina Kottonen (5); Mikko Leppilampi (6–7)	Timo Koivusalo (1); Sami Saikkonen (1–3); Katja Ståhl (1–3); Jaana Saarinen (2–3); Maria Sid (4); Janne Kataja (4); Mikko Von Hertzen (4); Sami Hedberg (5); Jari Sillanpää (5); Sara Forsberg (5); Riku Nieminen (5); David Hasselhoff (auditions, 5); Jorma Uotinen (6–7); Krista Siegfrids (6–7); Ernest Lawson (6–7); Hannu-Pekka "HP" Parviainen (6–7)	Season 1, 2007: Aleksi Vähäpassi (18-year-old beatboxer); Season 2, 2009: Miikka Mäkelä (27-year-old pantomime dancer); Season 3, 2011: VIP Bartenders (flair bartenders); Season 4, 2012: Daniel Helakorpi (7-year-old poem reader); Season 5, 2016: Antton Puonti (24-year-old hand player); Season 6, 2020: Akrotaiturit (acrobatic gymnastic dance group); Season 7, 2021: Sirkus Bravuuri (circus group); Season 8, TBA: Awaiting confirmation
France	Current; La France a un incroyable talent (4–); Former; Incroyable Talent (1–3)	M6	2 November 2006	Current; Karine Le Marchand (15–); Former; Alessandra Sublet (1–3); Alex Goude (4–10); Sandrine Corman (4–8); Louise Ekland (9); David Ginola (11–14)	Current; Hélène Ségara (10–); Éric Antoine (10–); Marianne James (13–); Sugar Sammy (13–); Former; Jean-Pierre Domboy (1); Sophie Edelstein (1–3, 5–8); Patrick Dupond (2–3)^{†} Smaïn (4); Valérie Stroh (4); Dave (5–8); Andrée Deissenberg (8); Lorie (9); Olivier Sitruk (9); Giuliano Peparini (9); Gilbert Rozon (1–11); Kamel Ouali (10–12)	Season 1, 2006: Salah Benlemqawanssa (27-year-old popper/b-boy); Season 2, 2007: Junior (26-year-old break dancer); Season 3, 2008: Alex (23-year-old fire artist); Season 4, 2009: Les Echos-liés (comic group); Season 5, 2010: Axel et Alizée (young dancing duo); Season 6, 2011: Marina Kaye (13-year-old singer); Season 7, 2012: Die Mobilés (shadow play); Season 8, 2013: Simon Heule (23-year-old acrobat); Season 9, 2014: Bagad de Vannes (choir); Season 10, 2015: Juliette and Charlie (dog act); Season 11, 2016: Antonio (42-year-old magician); Season 12, 2017: Laura Laune (31-year-old comedian/singer); Season 13, 2018: Jean-Baptiste Guégan (35-year-old singer); Season 14, 2019: Le Cas Pucine (20-year-old ventriloquist); Season 15, 2020: Famille Lefèvre (family opera group); Season 16, 2021: Le Chœur de Saint-Cyr (military choir); Season 17, 2022: Rayane (15-year-old pianist); Season 18, 2023: Mega Unity (dancers group); Season 19, 2024: Mathieu Stepson (38-year-old magician); Season 20, 2025: Duo EmYo (aerial straps); Season 21, 2026: Upcoming season
Georgia	ნიჭიერი Nichieri	Rustavi 2 (1–7, 10–); Imedi TV (8–9)	1 February 2010	Current; Nuki Koshkelishvili (10–); Tako Cohrgolashivili (11–); Former; Tika Patsatsia (1–4); Vano Tarkhnishvili (1–8); Giorgi Kipshidze (5–8); Gia Jajanidze (9); Giorgi Bakhutashvili (10)	Current; Tika Patsatsia (10–); Tako Pkhakadze (10–); Gigi Dedalamazishvili (11–); Mariam Sanogo (11–); Davit Porchkhidze (11–); Former; Gega Palavandishvili (1–4); Nikoloz Memanishvili (1); Maia Asatiani (1); Sopho Nizharadze (2–3); Vano Javakhishvili (2–3); Nika Gvaramia (4–7); Ia Parulava (4–6); Khatia Buniatishvili (4); Nanuka Zhorzholiani (4–6); Levan "Chola" Tsuladze (5–6); Ruska Makashvili (6–10); Zaal Udumashvili (7); Maka Chichua (7–8); Stefane Mgebrishvili (8); Giorgi Bakhutashvili (8); Anri Jokhadze (9); Maka Kvitsiani (9); Dima Oboladze (9); Irakli Imnaishvili (10)	Season 1, 2010: Levan Shavadze (singer); Season 2, 2011: Vano Pipia (13-year-old singer); Season 3, 2012: Nona Giunashvili (26-year-old sand artist); Season 4, 2013: City Band Group (musical band); Season 5, 2014: Temo Da Qeti (dancer and wheelchair dancer); Season 6, 2015: Barbara Samkharadze (14-year-old singer); Season 7, 2016–17: Eka Abuladze (singer); Season 8, 2017–18: The boys chapel and youth team (choir); Season 9, 2020: Lasha Gelashvili (illusionist); Season 10, 2022: Davit Lekashvili (excavator operator); Season 11, 2024-2025: Nia's Studio (dance-troupe); Season 12, TBA: Awaiting confirmation
Germany	Das Supertalent	RTL Television	20 October 2007	Current; Victoria Swarovski (14, 16–); Knossi (16–); Former; Marco Schreyl (1–5); Daniel Hartwich (2–14); Lola Weippert (15); Chris Tall (15)	Current; Dieter Bohlen (1–14, 16–); Bruce Darnell (2–4, 7–14, 16–); Ekaterina Leonova (16–); Tony Bauer (17–); Former; Ruth Moschner (1); André Sarrasani (1); Sylvie Meis (2–5, 12); Motsi Mabuse (5); Michelle Hunziker (6); Thomas Gottschalk (6); Lena Gercke (7–8); Guido Maria Kretschmer (7–8); Inka Bause (9); Victoria Swarovski (10); Nazan Eckes (11); Sarah Engels (13); Evelyn Burdecki (14); Chris Tall (14); Michael Michalsky (15); Lukas Podolski (15); Chantal Janzen (15); Ehrlich Brothers (15); Anna Ermakova (16)	Season 1, 2007: Ricardo Marinello (19-year-old opera singer); Season 2, 2008: Michael Hirte (44-year-old harmonica player); Season 3, 2009: Yvo Antoni & PrimaDonna (dog act); Season 4, 2010: Freddy Sahin-Scholl (57-year-old two-voice singer); Season 5, 2011: Leo Rojas (27-year-old panpipe player); Season 6, 2012: Jean-Michel Aweh (20-year-old singer and pianist); Season 7, 2013: Lukas Pratschker & Falco (dog act); Season 8, 2014: Marcel Kaupp (26-year-old drag queen and singer); Season 9, 2015: Jay Oh (29-year-old singer); Season 10, 2016: Angel Flukes (28-year-old singer); Season 11, 2017: Alexa Lauenburger & her mixed-breed dogs (dog act); Season 12, 2018: Stevie Starr (56-year-old professional regurgitator); Season 13, 2019: Christian Stoinev & Percy (acrobatics with dog training); Season 14, 2020: Nick Ferretti (30-year-old singer and guitarist); Season 15, 2021: Elena Turcan (10-year-old opera singer); Season 16, 2024: Alexander Doghmani (17-year-old opera singer); Season 17, 2025: Jayden Swingewood (16-year-old singer); Season 18, 2026: Awaiting confirmation
Greece	Ελλάδα Έχεις Ταλέντο; Ellada Eheis Talento	ANT1 (1–4, 7); Skai TV (5–6)	23 March 2007	Sophia Aliberti (1); Christos Ferentinos (2–4); Giorgos Lianos (5–6); Nikos Raptis (7); Stavros Svigos (7)	Ilias Psinakis (1–3); Matthildi Maggira (1–2); Vaggelis Perris (1–4); Eugenia Manolidou (3–4); Charis Christopoulos (4); Sakis Tanimanidis (5–6); Maria Bakodimou (5–6); Giorgos Kapoutzidis (5–6); Grigoris Arnaoutoglou (7); Takis Zaharatos (7); Elena Christopoulou (7); Crystallia Riga (7)	Season 1, 2007: Christos Zacharopoulos (12-year-old singer); Season 2, 2009: Kiss Madiam (band); Season 3, 2010: Nikos Georgas (55-year-old singer); Season 4, 2012: Stelios Legakis (14-year-old singer); Season 5, 2017: House of Drama (group of dancers); Season 6, 2018: En Xoro (Group of dancers); Season 7, 2022: Konstantinos Tsamados (14-year-old singer)
Hungary	Hungary's Got Talent	RTL Klub	10 October 2015	Balázs Sebestyén; István Dombóvári	Imre Csuja; Eszter Horgas; Patrícia Kovács; Márkó Linczényi	Season 1, 2015: Dirty Led Light Crew (electronic light act)
Hong Kong	Hong Kong's Got Talent	ViuTV	TBA	Anjaylia Chan; Neo Yau; Tommy Tsang	Lawrence Cheng; Josie Ho; Stephy Tang	Season 1, TBA: Upcoming season
Iceland	Ísland Got Talent	Stöð 2	December 2013	Auðunn Blöndal (1–2); Emmsjé Gauti (3)	Jón Jónsson (1–2); Þórunn Antonía Magnúsdóttir (1); Bubbi Morthens (1–2); Þorgerður Katrín Gunnarsdóttir (1–2); Selma Björnsdóttir (2); Ágústa Eva Erlendsdóttir (3); Marta María (3); Dr. Gunni (3); Jakob Frímann Magnússon (3)	Season 1, 2013–14: Brynjar Dagur (15-year-old dancer); Season 2, 2014–15: Alda Dís (22-year-old singer); Season 3, 2016: Johanna Ruth (14-year-old singer)
India	India's Got Talent	Colors (1–8); SET India (9–)	27 June 2009	Current; Haarsh Limbachiyaa (11–); Former; Nikhil Chinapa (1–2); Ayushmann Khurrana (1–2); Meiyang Chang (3); Gautam Rode (3); Manish Paul (4); Cyrus Sahukar (4); Mantra (5); VJ Andy (5); Nakuul Mehta (6); Sidharth Shukla (6–7)^{†} Bharti Singh (5–8); Rithvik Dhanjani (8); Arjun Bijlani (9–10)	Current; Malaika Arora Khan (4–8, 11–); Navjot Singh Sidhu (11–); Shaan (11–); Former; Shekhar Kapur (1); Sonali Bendre (1–3); Sajid Khan (2); Dharmendra Singh Deol (3)^{†} Farah Khan (4); Karan Johar (4–8); Manoj Muntashir (9); Kirron Kher (1–10); Badshah (9–10); Shilpa Shetty Kundra (9–10)	Season 1, 2009: Prince Dance Group; Season 2, 2010: Shillong Chamber Choir; Season 3, 2011: Suresh and Vernon Group; Season 4, 2012: Bad Salsa; Season 5, 2014: Ragini Makkhar & Naadyog Group Indore; Season 6, 2015: Manik Paul (22-year-old aerial dancer); Season 7, 2016: Flautist Suleiman (13-year-old flute player); Season 8, 2018: Javed Khan (27-year-old close-up magician); Season 9, 2022: Divyansh & Manuraj (beatbox and flute duo); Season 10, 2023: Abujmarh Mallakhamb and Sports Academy (modernized mallakhamb group); Season 11, 2025–26: The Amazing Apsaras (all-women dance troupe)
India	CEO's Got Talent	CNBC TV18	2014	Mini Mathur	Mahesh Bhatt; Raj Nayak; Raveena Tandon (1); Neha Dhupia (2)	Season 1, Early 2014: Atul Khatri; Season 2, Late 2014: Amar Raj Singh
Indonesia	Indonesia's Got Talent	Current; RCTI (3–); Former; Indosiar (1); SCTV (2)	23 July 2010	Current; Robby Purba (3–); Former; Tora Sudiro (1); Vincent Rompies (1); Ibnu Jamil (2); Evan Sanders (2)	Current; Ivan Gunawan (3–); Rossa (3–); Reza Oktovian (3–); Denny Sumargo (3–); Former; Ria Irawan (1)^{†} Anjasmara (1); Vina Panduwinata (1); Jay Subiyakto (2); Anggun (2); Ari Lasso (2); Indy Barends (2)	Season 1, 2010: Vania Larissa (15-year-old opera singer); Season 2, 2014: Putri Ariani (8-year-old blind singer); Season 3, 2022: Pasheman'90 (flag hoisting troop dancers); Season 4, 2023: Femme Fatale (dancers-magician group); Season 5, TBA: Awaiting confirmation
Iran	Persia's Got Talent	MBC Persia	31 January 2020	Farzan Athari; Tara Grammy	Ebi; Mahnaz Afshar; Arash; Nazanin Nour	Season 1, 2020: Navid Rezvani; Season 2, TBA: Awaiting confirmation
Ireland	Ireland's Got Talent	Virgin Media One	3 February 2018	Lucy Kennedy	Louis Walsh; Denise Van Outen; Jason Byrne; Michelle Visage	Season 1, 2018: RDC (dance troupe); Season 2, 2019: BSD (dance troupe)
Israel	הדבר הגדול הבא; HaDavar HaGadol HaBa	Channel 2 (Reshet)	26 June 2007	Noa Tishby	Motty Reif; Yael Bar Zohar; Yehoram Gaon	Season 1, 2007: Keren Elnekave and Yaniv Swissa (aerial acrobatics)
Israel	Got Talent ישראל; Israel's Got Talent	Reshet 13	18 February 2018	Ofer Shechter; Assi Israelof	Noa Kirel; Jordi; Maor Zaguri (1); Maya Dagan (1); Moran Atias (2); Uri Geller (2)	Season 1, 2018: Tomer Dudai (magician); Season 2, 2018–19: The Acrobatics Team (4 acrobats team); Children's shows Season 1, 2018: Acrobit (children's gymnastics team); Season 2, 2018–19: Yael Danon (12-year-old singer)
Italy	Italia's Got Talent	Current; Disney+ (13–); Former; Canale 5 (1–5); Sky Uno (6–12); Cielo (6); TV8 (7–12); Now (12)	12 December 2009	Current; Gianluca Fru (13–); Aurora Leone (13–); Former; Simone Annicchiarico (1–5); Geppi Cucciari (1–2); Belén Rodríguez (3–5); Vanessa Incontrada (6); Lodovica Comello (7–12)	Current; Frank Matano (6–); Mara Maionchi (9–); Elettra Lamborghini (13–); Alessandro Cattelan (14–); Former; Gerry Scotti (1–5); Maria De Filippi (1–5); Rudy Zerbi (1–5); Luciana Littizzetto (6–8); Nina Zilli (6–8); Claudio Bisio (6–9); Joe Bastianich (10–11); Elio (12); Federica Pellegrini (9–12); Khaby Lame (13)	Season 1, 2009–10: Carmen Masola (39-year-old opera singer); Season 2, 2011: Fabrizio Vendramin (49-year-old painter); Season 3, 2012: Stefano Scarpa (21-year-old acro pole flag man); Season 4, Spring 2013: Daniel Adomako (22-year-old singer); Season 5, Autumn 2013: Samuel Barletti (50-year-old ventriloquist); Season 6, 2015: Simone Al Ani (27-year-old manipulator dynamic); Season 7, 2016: Moses Concas (26-year-old harmonica player); Season 8, 2017: Trejolie (triple-duo-comedian); Season 9, 2019: Antonio Sorgentone (31-year-old singer/pianist); Season 10, 2020: Andrea Fratellini (46-year-old ventriloquist); Season 11, 2021: Stefano Bronzato (28-year-old card magician); Season 12, 2022: Antonio Vaglica (18-year-old singer); Season 13, 2023: Francesca Cesarini (16-year-old pole dancer); Season 14, 2025: Joe Romano (33-year-old singer)
Japan	Japan's Got Talent	Abema	11 February 2023	Kamaitachi	Masatoshi Hamada; Takayuki Yamada; Gackt; Alice Hirose	Season 1, 2023: Maria Seiren (opera singer); Season 2, TBA: Awaiting confirmation
Kazakhstan	Жұлдызды Сәт; Zhuldyzdy Set	Qazaqstan	11 May 2013	Tahir Sultan; Daniyar Tolbasy	Tuñgışbay äl Tarazï; Michelle Mukhamedkyzy; Islam Bairamukov	Season 1, 2013: Arman Qarınsaw (19-year-old singer)
Latvia	Ir talants!	TV3	6 October 2024	Rihards Sniegs; Mārtiņš Kapzems	Dons; Andrejs Ekis; Linda Paulauska	Season 1, 2024: Mariuss Grencis (14-year-old singer); Season 2, 2026: Upcoming season
Lithuania	Lietuvos talentai Lithuania's Got Talent	TV3	27 September 2009	Current; Mindaugas Stasiulis (2–3, 5–); Mindaugas Rainys (5–); Former; Džiugas Siaurusaitis (1–3); Vitalijus Cololo (1) ^{†} Marius Repšys (4); Ramūnas Cicėnas (4)	Current; Marijonas Mikutavičius (1–4, 6–); Rūta Ščiogolevaitė (1–4, 9–); Anželika Cholina (9–); Vytautas Rumšas (jaunesnysis) (9–); Former; Adolfas Večerskis (1–2); Vytautas Šapranauskas (3)^{†} Samas (4–5); Dalia Ibelhauptaitė (5); Ilona Balsytė (5); Naglis Šulija (5); Ineta Stasiulytė (6); Justinas Jankevičius (6–8); Inga Jankauskaitė (7–8)	Season 1, 2009: Mikas Stankevičius (22-year-old teeth player); Season 2, 2010: Martynas Levickis (20-year-old piano accordion player); Season 3, 2011: Marius Petrauskas (26-year-old singer); Season 4, 2014: Project Mayhem (street gymnasts); Season 5, 2017: Kasparas Bujanauskas (18-year-old juggler); Season 6, 2019: Edgaras Kerpė (19-year-old dancer); Season 7, 2022: Vaida Aleksandravičiūtė (27-year-old pole dancer); Season 8, 2023: Ignas Tamuli (18-year-old dancer); Season 9, 2025: Aušrinė ir Vakarė (dance group)
Malta	Malta's Got Talent	TVM	4 October 2020	Current; Gianni Zammit (2–); Former; Gordon Bonello (1)	Current; Sarah Zerafa; Ray Attard; Valentina Rossi (2–); Gordon Bonello (2–); Former; Howard Keith Debono (1); Maxine Aquilina (1)	Season 1, 2020: Jomike & Lydon Agius (father and son singing duo); Season 2, 2022: Kyran Bonello (14-year-old opera singer); Season 3, TBA: Awaiting confirmation
Mexico	México tiene talento	Azteca	19 October 2014	Rykardo Hernández (1–2); Eddy Vilard (3)	Héctor Martínez (1–2); Ximena Sariñana (1–2); José Manuel Figueroa (1); Kalimba (2); Adal Ramones (3); Horacio Villalobos (3); María José (3)	Season 1, 2014: Pablo López (43-year-old singer); Season 2, 2015: Fernando Badillo (24-year-old violinist); Season 3, 2019: Alexis Pérez (24-year-old musician)
Mongolia	Авьяаслаг Монголчууд; Mongolia's Got Talent	Mongol TV	20 September 2015	Current; Erkhbayar; Former; Ankhaa; Uuganaa; Manduul	Current; Battur (4–); Erdenechimeg (4–); Delgertsetseg (4–); Chuluunbat (4–); Former; Rokit Bay (1–3); Haranga (1–2); Chimegee (1–2); Degi (1–2); Ariunbaatar (3); Undarmaa (3); Anujin (3)	Season 1, 2015: Egshiglent Chimee (children's orchestra); Season 2, 2016: Enkh-Erdene (20-year-old country singer); Season 3, 2018: Bilegt (25-year-old magician); Season 4, 2023: Khasar & Naranchimeg (mother and son); Season 5, TBA: Awaiting confirmation
Moldova	Moldova are talent Moldova's Got Talent	Prime TV Moldova	11 October 2013	Mircea Marco; Adrian Ursu	Mihai Munteanu; Tania Cergă; Nicu Țărnă	Season 1, 2013: Monica Pîrlici (11-year-old poetry artist); Season 2, 2014: Ana Munteanu (13-year-old singer)
Myanmar	Myanmar's Got Talent	MRTV-4	28 September 2014	Tay Zar Kyaw; Soe Htun Win	Current; Moht Moht Myint Aung; Maung Thi; Mg Mg Aye (4–); Khine Thin Kyi (6–); Former; A Yoe (1–2); Rebecca Win (2–3); Myo Gyi (3); Nay Nay (4); Chit Thu Wai (5)	Season 1, 2014: Wai Yan Naing (danger magician); Season 2, 2015: Jar Jet Aung (13-year-old robot dancer); Season 3, 2016: Jimmy Ko Ko (23-year-old contemporary dancer); Season 4, 2017: Ayar Maung Team (traditional elephant dancing team); Season 5, 2018: Junior Creative (shadow dance group); Season 6, 2019: Phone Myat Min (5-year-old acrobat); Season 7, TBA: Awaiting confirmation
Netherlands	Holland's Got Talent	SBS 6 (1–2); RTL 4 (3–15)	28 March 2008	Gerard Joling (1–2); Robert ten Brink (3–7); Johnny de Mol (8–9); Humberto Tan (10–11); Jamai Loman (12–15); Buddy Vedder (12–15)	Patricia Paay (1–5); Henkjan Smits (1–2); Robert Ronday (1–2); Dan Karaty (3–10, 12–15); Gordon Heuckeroth (3–9); Chantal Janzen (6–15); Angela Groothuizen (8–11); Paul de Leeuw (10–11); Ali B (11); Marc-Marie Huijbregts (12–15); Edson da Graça (12–14); Soundos El Ahmadi (15)	Season 1, 2008: Daniëlle Bubberman (13-year-old contortionist); Season 2, 2009: Tessa Kersten (11-year-old guitarist/singer); Season 3, 2010: Martin Hurkens (57-year-old opera singer); Season 4, 2011: Aliyah Kolf (11-year-old singer); Season 5, 2012: DDF Crew (ropeskipping); Season 6, 2013: Amira Willighagen (9-year-old opera singer); Season 7, 2014: León Lissitza (81-year-old crossover singer); Season 8, 2016: Nick Nicolai (18-year-old singer); Season 9, 2017: The Fire (hip-hop dance group); Season 10, 2019: Shinshan (17-year-old dancer); Season 11, 2020: Tommy & Rowan (16-year-old dance duo); Season 12, 2022: CDK JR (dance troupe); Season 13, 2023: Rik & Aimée (acrobatic duo); Season 14, 2024: World of Afro (dance group); Season 15, 2025: Vladyslav & Veronika (28-and-26-year-old dancers)
New Zealand	New Zealand's Got Talent	Prime (1); TV One (2–3)	8 September 2008	Andrew Mulligan (1); Jason Reeves (1); Tāmati Coffey (2–3)	Miriama Smith (1); Paul Ellis (1); Richard Driver (1); Ali Campbell (2); Jason Kerrison (2–3); Rachel Hunter (2–3); Cris Judd (3)	Season 1, 2008: Chaz Cummings (16-year-old dancer); Season 2, 2012: Clara van Wel (15-year-old singer); Season 3, 2013: Renee Maurice (22-year-old singer)
Nigeria	Nigeria's Got Talent	AIT; NTA	16 September 2012	Andre Blaze Henshaw	Dan Foster^{†} Kate Henshaw; Yibo Koko	Season 1, 2012: Amarachi Uyanne (8-year-old dancer); Season 2, 2013: Robots for Christ (popping dance duo)
Norway	Norske Talenter	Current; TVNorge (11–); Former; TV 2 (1–10)	22 February 2008	Current; Solveig Kloppen (5–); Former; Marte Stokstad (1); Sturla Berg-Johansen (1–2); Pia Lykke (2); Marthe Sveberg Bjørstad (3–4); John Brungot (3–4); Stian Blipp Glopholm (5)	Current; Dennis Storhøi (11–); Abdulhakim "Hkeem" Hassane (11–); Stian Blipp (11–); Silya Nymoen (11–); Former; Jan Fredrik Karlsen (1–2); Thomas Giertsen (1–3); Alex Rosén (3–5); Adil Khan (4–5); Omer Bhatti (6); Lisa Tønne (6); Bjarte Hjelmeland (6); Linn Skåber (7–8); Suleman Malik (7–8); Mia Gundersen (1–10); Bjarne Brøndbo (7–10); Janne Formoe (9–10); Mona Berntsen (9–10)	Season 1, 2008: Erlend Bratland (16-year-old singer); Season 2, 2009: Quick (hip-hop dance group); Season 3, 2010: Kristian Rønning (23-year-old rapper); Season 4, 2011: Daniel Johansen Elmhari (11-year-old dancer); Season 5, 2012: Stine H. Ulla (17-year-old opera singer); Season 6, 2014: Angelina Jordan (8-year-old singer); Season 7, 2015: Odin Landbakk (13-year-old guitarist); Season 8, 2017: Vilde Winge (14-year-old sign language performer); Season 9, 2018: Tuva Lutro (12-year-old singer); Season 10, 2019: Amalie Skeide Sandvik (18-year-old sport drill arcobat); Season 11, 2023: Musikaljentene (dance group); Season 12, 2024: Jump Crew (dance troupe); Season 13, TBA: Awaiting confirmation
Pakistan	Pakistan's Got Talent	Geo TV	18 July 2026	Mushk Kaleem	Ali Zafar; Usman Bashir; Mehwish Hayat; Tabish Hashmi	Season 1, 2026: Fawad Alam Khan (blind Qawwali artist)
Peru	Perú Tiene Talento	Latina	15 September 2012	Christian Rivero (1–2); Adolfo Aguilar (3); Jesús Alzamora (3); Mathías Brivio (4)	Carlos Galdós (1–3); Cecilia Bracamonte (1–2); Almendra Gomelsky (1–2); Beto Ortiz (2); Natalia Málaga (3); Dina Páucar (3); Pablo Villanueva Melcochita (3); Renzo Schuller (4); Ricardo Morán (4); Mimy Succar (4); Gianella Neyra (4)	Season 1, 2012: Alessandra Aguirre (11-year-old singer); Season 2, 2013: Rod Martin (18-year-old painter); Season 3, 2014: Gianfranco Huanqui (18-year-old Rubik's Cube solver); Season 4, 2022: Fusión Peruana (dance group)
Philippines	Pilipinas Got Talent	Current; Kapamilya Channel (7–); TV5 (7–); Former; ABS-CBN (1–6)	20 February 2010	Current; Robi Domingo (7–); Melai Cantiveros (7–); Former; Luis Manzano (1–5); Billy Crawford (1–6); Toni Gonzaga (6)	Current; Freddie M. Garcia; Kathryn Bernardo (7–); Eugene Domingo (7–); Donny Pangilinan (7–); Former; Ai-Ai Delas Alas (1–4); Kris Aquino (1–4); Vice Ganda (5–6); Robin Padilla (5–6); Angel Locsin (5–6)	Season 1, 2010: Jovit Baldivino (16-year-old singer); Season 2, 2011: Marcelito Pomoy (25-year-old falsetto singer); Season 3, 2011: Maasinhon Trio (singing trio); Season 4, 2013: Roel Manlangit (13-year-old singer); Season 5, 2016: Power Duo (acrobatic dancesport duo); Season 6, 2018: Kristel de Catalina (32-year-old spiral pole dancer); Season 7, 2025: Cardong Trumpo (55-year-old trompo spinner); Season 8, TBA: Awaiting confirmation
Poland	Mam talent!	TVN	13 September 2008	Current; Jan Pirowski (15–); Paulina Krupińska-Karpiel (17-); Former; Marcin Prokop (1–14); Szymon Hołownia (1–12); Michał Kempa (13–14); Agnieszka Woźniak-Starak (15–16)	Current; Agnieszka Chylińska; Marcin Prokop (15–); Agustin Egurrola (6–12, 17–); TBA (18–); Former; Małgorzata Foremniak (1–14); Kuba Wojewódzki (1–3); Robert Kozyra (4–5); Jan Kliment (13–14); Julia Wieniawa (15–17)	Season 1, 2008: Melkart Ball (acrobatics duo); Season 2, 2009: Marcin Wyrostek (28-year-old button accordion player); Season 3, 2010: Magdalena Welc (12-year-old singer); Season 4, 2011: Kacper Sikora (19-year-old singer); Season 5, 2012: Delfina & Bartek (acrobatics duo); Season 6, 2013: (Ukraine) Tetiana Galitsyna (28-year-old sand artist); Season 7, 2014: Adrian Makar (15-year-old singer); Season 8, 2015: Aleksandra Kiedrowicz (21-year-old aerial silk artist); Season 9, 2016: Jakub Herfort (20-year-old singer); Season 10, 2017: Lukas Gogol (15-year-old button accordion player); Season 11, 2018: Duo Destiny (hand balancing duo); Season 12, 2019: Marysia And Julian (acrobats duo); Season 13, 2021: Krzysztof Jaros (18-year-old contemporary dancer); Season 14, 2022: Miłosz Bachonko (14-year-old button accordion player); Season 15, 2024: Bartek Wasilewski (14-year-old rapper); Season 16, 2025: Krystian Leśnik (12-year-old singer); Season 17, 2026: Liza & Dina (dancing dog act); Season 18, 2027: Upcoming season
Portugal	Aqui Há Talento	RTP1	28 January 2007	Sílvia Alberto	Paulo Dias; Sílvia Rizzo; Joaquim Monchique	Season 1, 2007: Abstractin (breakdance)
Portugal	Portugal Tem Talento	SIC	30 January 2011	Bárbara Guimarães	Ricardo Pais; Conceição Lino; José Diogo Quintela	Season 1, 2011: Filipe "Fubu" Santos (22-year-old beatboxer)
Portugal	Got Talent Portugal	RTP1	18 January 2015	Current; Sílvia Alberto (3–); Former; Marco Horácio (1); José Pedro Vasconcelos (2); Vanessa Oliveira (2); Pedro Fernandes (3–4)	Current; Manuel Moura dos Santos; Filomena Cautela (8–); Inês Aires Pereira (8–); Rui Massena (1, 8–); Former; Sofia Escobar (1–2, 5–7); Pedro Tochas (1–7); Mariza (2); Cuca Roseta (3–7)	Season 1, 2015: The ArtGym Company (acrobatic gymnastic); Season 2, 2016: Micaela Abreu (15-year-old singer); Season 3, 2017: António Casalinho (13-year-old dancer); Season 4, 2018: Ninfas do Atlântico (group of female classical singers); Season 5, 2020: João Pataco and Miguel Tira Picos (acrobats); Season 6, 2021: Fadoalado (fado music group); Season 7, 2022: Acro AAS (acrobatic group); Season 8, 2024: Sofia Rolão (27-year-old gymnast); Season 9, 2025: Gil Brito (9-year-old pianist); Season 10, 2026: FREE ACRO SOULS (acrobats); Season 11, 2027: Upcoming season
Romania; Moldova	Românii au talent Romania's Got Talent	Pro TV; ProTV Chișinău	18 February 2011	Smiley; Pavel Bartoș	Current; Andi Moisescu (1–); Andra (1–); Nadia Comăneci (17–); Mihai Bobonete (12–); Former; Constantin Cotimanis (5); Mihaela Rădulescu (5–8); Mihai Petre (1–4, 9–10); Florin Călinescu (6–11); Alexandra Dinu (11); Dragoș Bucur (12–15); Carmen Tănase (16)	Season 1, 2011: Adrian Ţuţu (19-year-old rapper); Season 2, 2012: Cristian Gog (31-year-old mentalist); Season 3, 2013: Bruno Icobeț (dancing dog act); Season 4, 2014: Brio Sonores (opera singers); Season 5, 2015: Cristian Leana (Rubik's Cube solver); Season 6, 2016: Laura Bretan (13-year-old opera singer); Season 7, 2017: Lorelai Mosneguțu (14-year-old armless singer, pianist and painter); Season 8, 2018: Emil Rengle (27-year-old dancer); Season 9, 2019: Ana Maria Pantaze (39-year-old singer); Season 10, 2020: Radu Palaniță (40-year-old singer); Season 11, 2021: Ana-Maria Mărgean (11-year-old ventriloquist/singer); Season 12, 2022: Darius Mabda (13-year-old dancer); Season 13, 2023: Rares Prisacariu (7-year-old spoken word poet); Season 14, 2024: Cristian Ciaușu (15-year-old pan-flute player); Season 15, 2025: Damaris Lupu (15-year-old contortionist); Season 16, 2026: Re-born (contemporary dance and gymnastics group); Season 17, 2027: Upcoming season
Russia	Минута славы Minuta slavy	Channel One	17 February 2007	Garik Martirosyan (1–2); Alexander Tsekalo (3); Ville Haapasalo (4); Alexander Oleshko (4–8); Julia Kovalchuk (5–7); Dmitry Shepelev (6–7); Mikhail Boyarsky (9)	Tatyana Tolstaya (1–3); Alexander Maslyakov (1–8)^{†} Alexander Tsekalo (2); Leonid Parfyonov (4); Mariya Shukshina (5); Larisa Guzeyeva (6–8); Sergei Yursky (7, 9)^{†} Vladimir Posner (9); Renata Litvinova (9); Sergei Svetlakov (9)	Season 1, 2007: Maxim Tokayev (14-year-old piano accordion player); Season 2, 2007: Dimitry Bulkin a.k.a. Dima Shine (22-year-old gymnastics parade); Season 3, 2008: Grace (ensemble); Season 4, 2009–10: Brothers of Grinchenko (acrobats); Season 5, 2010–11: Viktor Kochkin and Danil Anastasin (breakdancers without legs); Season 6, 2011–12: Igor Butorin (hula hoops); Season 7, 2012–13: "I Team" group (jumping on a trampoline); Season 8, 2013–14: Olga Trifonova (aeralist), Alex Magala (sword swallower); Season 9, 2017: Vardanyan Bbrothers (acrobat duo)
Russia	Я почти знаменит Ya pochti znamenit	Channel One	17 January 2021	Sergei Minaev; Aglaya Shilovskaya	Nikolai Tsiskaridze; Zhanna Badoeva; Alexei Yagudin	Season 1, 2021: Semyon Bukharin (59-year-old artist)
Serbia; Bosnia and Herzegovina; Montenegro	Ја имам таленат! Ja imam talenat!	RTV Pink (1, 5); RTS (2–4); Pink BH; Pink M	21 September 2009	Vladimir Aleksić; Ivana Bajić (1–4); Ana Mihajlovski (5)	Danica Maksimović (1–2, 5); Ivan Tasovac (1–4)^{†} Aleksandar Milić Mili (1–3); Mina Lazarević (3); Ivan Bosiljčić (4); Nataša Ninković (4); Ana Nikolić (5); Srđan Todorović (5); Stefan Đurić Rasta (5)	Season 1, 2009: Danijel, Darko and Sandra Piler (young music trio); Season 2, 2011: Milica Dokić and Nenad Mahmutović (deaf dancers); Season 3, 2011–12: Bojana and Nikola Peković (young traditional musicians); Season 4, 2012–13: Katarina Kovačević (21-year-old singer); Season 5: 2016–17: Bar strong (acrobatic team)
Serbia; Bosnia and Herzegovina; Montenegro	Ja imam supertalenat	Prva	30 September 2026	Marijana Mićić	Branko Đurić Đuro; Luka Aranđelović; Anja Mit; Dejan Milićević	Season 1, 2026: Upcoming season
Slovakia	Slovensko má talent	Markíza	21 September 2008	Maroš Kramár; Barbora Rakovská	Jan Kraus; Adela Banášová; Paľo Habera	Season 1, 2008: Old School Brothers (hip-hop breakers)
Slovenia	Slovenija ima talent	POP TV	21 March 2010	Current; Melani Mekicar (11–); Sašo Stare (7–); Former; Jože Robežnik (3); Matej Puc (3); Vid Valič (1–2, 4–6); Domen Valič (6–7); Peter Poles (1–2, 4–5, 8–10)	Current; Borut Pahor (11–); Lado Bizovičar (5–); Alya (11–); Nuška Drašček (11–); Former; Brane Kastelic (1–2); Lucienne Lončina (1–2); Branko Čakarmiš (1–9); Damjan Damjanovič (3); Rok Golob (4); Ana Klašnja (3–10); Marjetka Vovk (5–10); Andrej Škufca (10)	Season 1, 2010: Lina Kuduzović (7-year-old singer); Season 2, 2011: Julija Kramar (35-year-old opera singer); Season 3, 2013: Alja Krušič (16-year-old singer); Season 4, 2014: Jana Šušterič (29-year-old singer); Season 5, 2015: Jernej Kozan (21-year-old dancer); Season 6, 2016: WildArt (Timotej & Lenart) (string duo); Season 7, 2018: Tjaša Dobravec (24-year-old pole art dancer); Season 8, 2021: Tajda Korče (15-year-old gymnast); Season 9, 2023: Domen Kljun (25-year-old singer); Season 10, 2024: Edvard & Frida (mind-readers); Season 11, 2026: Upcoming season
South Africa	SA's Got Talent	SABC2 (1–2) e.tv (3–8)	1 October 2009	Rob van Vuuren (1–2); Anele Mdoda (1–2); Tats Nkonzo (3–6); Tol Ass Mo (7–8)	Randal Abrahams (1–2); Ian Von Memerty (1–4)^{†} Shado Twala; Kabelo Mabalane (3–4); Lalla Hirayama (5–6); DJ Fresh (5–8); Jamie Bartlett (7–8)^{†}	Season 1, 2009: Darren Rajbal (19-year-old deaf hip hop dancer); Season 2, 2010: James Bhemgee (45-year-old opera singer); Season 3, 2012: Botlhale Boikanyo (11-year-old praise poet); Season 4, 2013: Johnny Apple (16-year-old singer); Season 5, 2014: Tholwana Mohale (14-year-old singer and guitarist); Season 6, 2015: DJ Arch Jnr (3-year-old DJ); Season 7, 2016: Kryptonite Dance Academy (dance group); Season 8, 2017: AnecNote (a cappella group)
South Korea	코리아 갓 탤런트; Korea's Got Talent	tvN	4 June 2011	Noh Hong-Cheol; Shin Young-Il	Jang Jin; Kolleen Park; Song Yun-Ah (1); Kim Gu-ra (2); Jang Hang-jun (2)	Season 1, 2011: Joo Ming-Jong (17-year-old popping dancer); Season 2, 2012: Blue Whale Bros (popping dance duo)
Spain	Tienes Talento	Cuatro	25 January 2008	Nuria Roca; Eduardo Aldán	Natalia Millán; Miqui Puig; Josep Vicent; David Summers	Season 1, 2008: Salva Rodríguez (16-year-old flamenco singer)
Spain	Got Talent España	Telecinco	13 February 2016	Santi Millán	Current; Paula Echevarría (8–); Carlos Latre (11–); Lorena Castell (11–); Xuso Jones (12–); Former; Jesús Vázquez (1); Eva Hache (1–3); Jorge Javier Vázquez (1–3); Eva Isanta (4); Paz Padilla (4–6); Dani Martínez (5–8); Edurne (1–9); Florentino Fernández (9–10); Tamara Falcó (10); Risto Mejide (2–11)	Season 1, 2016: Cristina Ramos (37-year-old opera and rock music singer); Season 2, 2017: Antonio "El Tekila" (44-year-old rockabilly dancer); Season 3, 2018: César Brandon (24-year-old poet); Season 4, 2019: Murga Zeta Zetas (murga group); Season 5, 2019: Hugo Molina (3-year-old drummer); Season 6, 2021: Celia Muñoz (35-year-old ventriloquist); Season 7, 2021: Dúo Turkeev (acrobatic duo); Season 8, 2022: Jordi Caps (51-year-old magician); Season 9, 2023: Lil Kids (dance group); Season 10, 2024: Nataliya Stepanska (36-year-old opera singer); Season 11, 2026: Am Dance Studio; Season 12, 2027: Upcoming season
Sri Lanka	Sri Lanka's Got Talent	Sirasa TV	18 March 2018	Current; Ranga Jayakodi (2–); Chamal Rathnayake (2–); Former; Dasun Madushan (1); Piyath Rajapaksha (1)	Current; Akhila Dhanuddhara (2–); Sangeetha Weeraratne (2–); Danu Innasithamby (2–); Stephanie Siriwardhana (3–); Former; Soundarie David Rodrigo (1); Jackson Anthony (1)^{†} Tillakaratne Dilshan (1); Natasha Rathnayake (2)	Season 1, 2018: Navy Angampora Pool (Angampora marshal art group); Season 2, 2024: Ravindra Kumara; Season 3, 2025–26: Katuwana Sando (strongman)
Sweden	Talang (1–5, 7–); Talang Sverige (6)	TV4 (1–5, 7–); TV3 (6)	13 April 2007	Current; Pär Lernström (7–); Tord (doll)(14–); Former; Peppe Eng (1–2); Kodjo Akolor (2); Tobbe Blom (3–5); Markoolio (3–5); Adam Alsing (6); Malin Gramer (6); Kristina "Keyyo" Petrushina (7–8); Samir Badran (9–11)	Current; David Batra (7–); Kristina "Keyyo" Petrushina (14–); Michael Lindgren (14–); Molly Hammar (14–); Former; Tobbe Blom (1–2); Hanna Hedlund (1); Bert Karlsson (1–5); Sofia Wistam (2); Charlotte Perrelli (3–5); Johan Pråmell (3–4); Henrik Fexeus (5); Robert Aschberg (6); Shirley Clamp (6); Carolina Gynning (6); Tobias Karlsson (6); Kakan Hermansson (7); Alexander Bard (7–10); LaGaylia Frazier (7–10); Bianca Wahlgren Ingrosso (8–12); Edward af Sillén (11–12); Sarah Dawn Finer (11–12); Helena Bergstrom (13); Johanna Nordstrom (13); Viktor Noren (13)	Season 1, 2007: Zillah & Totte (ventriloquist); Season 2, 2008: Zara Larsson (10-year-old singer); Season 3, 2009: Charlie Caper (30-year-old magician); Season 4, 2010: Jill Svensson (14-year-old opera singer); Season 5, 2011: Simon Westlund (17-year-old Rubik's Cube solver); Season 6, 2014: Jon Henrik Fjällgren (27-year-old Sami singer); Season 7, 2017: Ibrahim Nasrullayev (17-year-old singer); Season 8, 2018: Madeleine Hilleard (15-year-old opera singer); Season 9, 2019: Micke Holm (46-year-old singer); Season 10, 2020: Lizette & Lotus (dancing dog act); Season 11, 2021: Johan Stahl (41-year-old magician); Season 12, 2022: Aron Aras-Ericksson (11-year-old singer); Season 13, 2023: Pontus Lindman (27-year-old magician); Season 14, 2027: Upcoming season
Switzerland (in German)	Die grössten Schweizer Talente	SRF1	29 January 2011	Sven Epiney (1–2); Andrea Jansen (1); Anna Maier (2); Viola Tami (3–4)	DJ Bobo (1–3); Christa Rigozzi (1–3); Roman Kilchsperger (1–2); Gilbert Gress (3–4); Sven Epiney (3); Jonny Fischer (4); Susanne Kunz (4); Bligg (4)	Season 1, 2011: Maya Wirz (49-year-old opera singer); Season 2, 2012: Eliane Müller (21-year-old singer); Season 3, 2015: Flavio Rizzello (10-year-old singer); Season 4, 2016: Jason Brügger (22-year-old acrobat)
Thailand	Thailand's Got Talent	Channel 3 (1–6); 3 HD (5–6); Workpoint TV (7)	6 March 2011	Ketseptsawat Palakrawong Na Ayutthaya (1–7); Krit Sripoomsed (1–2); Sudarat Budprom (3)	Pinyo Ruedhamma (1–3); Pornchita na Songkhla (1–5); Nirut Sirijanya (1); Jirayut Wattanasin (2–3); Chalatit Tantiwut (4-6); Patcharasri Benjamas (4-6); Nitipong Hornak (4-6); Kathaleeya McIntosh (6); Pongsak Rattanaphong (7); Cris Horwang (7); Jennifer Kim (7); Yuhtlerd Sippapak (7)	Season 1, 2011: Maneepatsorn "Myra" Molloy (13-year-old classical singer); Season 2, 2012: Rachanikorn "Leng" Keawdee (27-year-old aerial acrobat); Season 3, 2013: Somchai Nilsree (29-year-old singer-songwriter/guitarist); Season 4, 2014: Wheelchair Dance (wheelchair dance group); Season 5, 2015: Thaiphukuew (dance troupe); Season 6, 2016: Duo Soul Sister (aerialists duo); Season 7, 2018: KV Family (aerialists group)
Turkey	Yetenek Sizsiniz Türkiye	Show TV (1–3); Star TV (4–5); TV8 (6–8); Now (9–)	13 November 2009	Current; Alp Kırşan (4–); Beyza Şekerci (9–); Former; Tanem Sivar (1); Kübra Subaşı (2–3)	Current; İlker Ayrık (9–); Eda Ece (9–); Hande Yener (9–); Şevval Sam (9–); Former; Ali Taran (1–2, 7–8); Acun Ilicali (1–6, 8); Hülya Avşar (1–5, 8); Sergen Yalçın (3–4); Eser Yenenler (5–7); Ozgu Namal (6); Murat Boz (6); Seda Bakan (7)	Season 1, 2009–10: Bilal Avcı and Uğur Karameşe (popping dance); Season 2, 2011: Sefa Doğanay (imitator); Season 3, 2011–12: Ali Yeşilırmak and Max the dog (dog act); Season 4, 2012–13: Atalay Demirci (comedian); Season 5, 2013–14: Burak & Kıvanç (illusion); Season 6, 2014–15: Yunus Karaca (comedian); Season 7, 2015–16: Hayatın Ritmini Yakala (orchestra); Season 8, 2017–18: Queens Of The Dance (kids' dance troupe); Season 9, 2025: Aytaç Doğan (7-year-old musician); Season 10, TBA: Awaiting confirmation
Ukraine	Україна має талант Ukrayina maye talant	STB	3 April 2009	Current Hryhoriy Reshetnik (8–); Former; Oksana Marchenko (1–6); Dmytro Tankovich (7); Kostiantyn Tomilchenko (7)	Current; Stanislav Boklan (9–); Olena Kravets (9–); Artem Pyvovarov (9–); Former; Vladsyslav Yama (1–5); Slava Frolova (1–7); Ihor Kondratyuk (1–7); Hector Jimenez-Bravo (6); Vyacheslav Uzelkov (6–7)^{†} Serhiy Prytula (8); Kseniya Mishyna (8); Yevhen Kot (8)	Season 1, 2009: Kseniya Simonova (24-year-old sand artist); Season 2, 2010: Olena Kovtun (26-year-old singer); Season 3, 2011: Vitaliy Luzkar (24-year-old illusionist); Season 4, 2012: The team of "Workout" (acrobats); Season 5, 2013: The team of "Lisapetny Battalion" (singers); Season 6, 2014: The Dudnik Family (acrobats); Season 7, 2015: Said Abd Allah Dzhurdi (23-year-old singer); Season 8, 2021: Artem Fesko (14-year-old singer); Season 9, 2026: Current season
United Kingdom	Britain's Got Talent	ITV	9 June 2007	Ant and Dec	Current; Simon Cowell; Amanda Holden; Alesha Dixon (6–); KSI (19–); Former; Piers Morgan (1–4); Michael McIntyre (5); David Hasselhoff (5); David Walliams (6–15); Bruno Tonioli (16–18)	Series 1, 2007: Paul Potts (36-year-old opera singer); Series 2, 2008: George Sampson (14-year-old street dancer); Series 3, 2009: Diversity (dance troupe); Series 4, 2010: Spelbound (gymnastics troupe); Series 5, 2011: Jai McDowall (24-year-old singer); Series 6, 2012: Ashleigh and Pudsey (dancing dog act); Series 7, 2013: Attraction (shadow theatre group); Series 8, 2014: Collabro (boy band); Series 9, 2015: Jules O'Dwyer & Matisse (dancing dog act); Series 10, 2016: Richard Jones (25-year-old close up magician); Series 11, 2017: Tokio Myers (32-year-old pianist); Series 12, 2018: Lost Voice Guy (37-year-old comedian); Series 13, 2019: Colin Thackery (89-year-old singer); Series 14, 2020: Jon Courtenay (46-year-old comedic singer and pianist); Series 15, 2022: Axel Blake (33-year-old stand-up comedian); Series 16, 2023: Viggo Venn (33-year-old comedian); Series 17, 2024: Sydnie Christmas (28-year-old singer); Series 18, 2025: Harry Moulding (24-year-old magician); Series 19, 2026: The Hawkstone Farmers Choir; Series 20, 2027: Upcoming series
United States	America's Got Talent	NBC	21 June 2006	Current; Terry Crews (14–); Former; Regis Philbin^{†} (1); Jerry Springer^{†} (2–3); Nick Cannon (4–11); Tyra Banks (12–13)	Current; Howie Mandel (5–); Simon Cowell (11–); Mel B (8–13, 20–); Sofia Vergara (15–); Former; Brandy (1); David Hasselhoff (1–4); Piers Morgan (1–6); Sharon Osbourne (2–7); Howard Stern (7–10); Heidi Klum (8–13, 15–19); Gabrielle Union (14); Julianne Hough (14)	Season 1, 2006: Bianca Ryan (11-year-old singer); Season 2, 2007: Terry Fator (42-year-old ventriloquist/singer); Season 3, 2008: Neal E. Boyd (32-year-old opera singer)^{†} Season 4, 2009: Kevin Skinner (35-year-old singer); Season 5, 2010: Michael Grimm (30-year-old singer); Season 6, 2011: Landau Eugene Murphy, Jr. (36-year-old singer); Season 7, 2012: Olate Dogs (dog act); Season 8, 2013: Kenichi Ebina (38-year-old dance/mime act); Season 9, 2014: Mat Franco (25-year-old close-up magician); Season 10, 2015: Paul Zerdin (43-year-old ventriloquist); Season 11, 2016: Grace VanderWaal (12-year-old singer/songwriter/ukulele player); Season 12, 2017: Darci Lynne (12-year-old ventriloquist/singer); Season 13, 2018: Shin Lim (26-year-old card magician); Season 14, 2019: Kodi Lee (23-year-old blind and autistic singer/pianist); Season 15, 2020: Brandon Leake (27-year-old spoken word poet); Season 16, 2021: Dustin Tavella (35-year-old magician); Season 17, 2022: Mayyas (mainly female dance group); Season 18, 2023: Adrian Stoica and Hurricane (45-year-old dog act); Season 19, 2024: Richard Goodall (55-year-old singer); Season 20, 2025: Jessica Sanchez (30-year-old singer); Season 21, 2026: Nene Royal; Season 22, 2027: Upcoming season
Uruguay	Got Talent Uruguay	Canal 10	22 June 2020	Natalia Oreiro	Agustín Casanova; Claudia Fernández; María Noel Ricetto; Orlando Petinatti	Season 1, 2020: Diego Coronel (26-year-old opera singer); Season 2, 2021: Enzo Castro (7-year-old button accordion player); Season 3, 2022: Camila Iza Machado (15-year-old singer)
Uzbekistan	O'zbekiston Got Talent	FTV	30 August 2024/14 February 2025	Current; Abbbose (live shows); Zarina Yuldasheva (live shows); Former; Ozodbek Khurramov (castings)	Current; Bobur Yuldashev; Sitora Alimjanova (live shows); Ibroxim Axmedov; Former; Shahzoda Mukhamedova (castings)	Season 1, 2024/25: Jansuliw Tatlimuratova (16-year-old gymnast); Season 2, 2026: Upcoming season
Vietnam	Tìm kiếm tài năng – Vietnam's Got Talent	VTV3	18 December 2011	Chi Bảo (1); Quyền Linh (1); Thanh Bạch (2); Thanh Vân (3); Duy Hải (4); Diệp Lâm Anh (4)	Thành Lộc (1–3); Thúy Hạnh (1–3); Huy Tuấn; Hoài Linh (3); Việt Hương (4); Trấn Thành (4)	Season 1, 2011–12: Đăng Quân & Bảo Ngọc (11-and-6-year-old sport dancers); Season 2, 2012–13: Trần Hữu Kiên (26-year-old opera singer); Season 3, 2014–15: Nguyễn Đức Vĩnh (8-year-old Hát tuồng); Season 4, 2016: Nguyễn Trọng Nhân (9-year-old drummer)

=== Got Talent Kids around the world ===
Country	Name	Network	Premiere	Host(s)	Judges	Seasons and winners majority
Italy	Kid's Got Talent	TV8; Sky Uno	2016	Claudio Bisio; Lodovica Comello	Unknown	Season 1, 2016: No winner Season 2, 2017: Unknown
Lithuania	Lietuvos talentai. Supervaikai; Lithuania's Got Talent. Superkids	TV3 Lithuania	15 March 2020	Mindaugas Stasiulis; Mindaugas Rainys	Marijonas Mikutavičius; Neringa Čereškevičienė; Justinas Jankevičius	Season 1, 2020: Jonas Vozbutas (button accordion player)
Turkey	Yetenek Sizsiniz Türkiye Minikler	Show TV	2012	Unknown	Acun Ilicali (1); Hülya Avşar (1); Sergen Yalçın (1)	Season 1, 2012: Unknown
Ukraine	Україна має талант. Діти; Ukrayina maye talant. Dity	STB	2016	Dmytro Tankovich; Elena Antonova	DZIDZIO; Slava Frolova; Ihor Kondratyuk	Season 1, 2016: Arinka Shuhalevych; Season 2, 2017: Veronika Morska

=== Got More Talent around the world ===
Country/region	Name	Network	Premiere	Host(s)	Corresponding seasons
Arab world	Arabs Got Talent Extra	MBC	2013	Nardine Farag	3–4
Czech Republic; Slovakia	Česko Slovensko Má Talent Plus	Plus	2011	Monika Zázrivcová; Laco Kováč	2
France	La France a un incroyable talent, ça continue...	M6	2009	Jérôme Anthony (4–13); Anthony Joubert (4–5); Donel Jack'sman (14); Pierre-Antoine Damecour (15–17); Juju Fitcats (18–)	4–
India	India's Got More Talent	Colors	2009	Roshni Chopra	1
Indonesia	Indonesia's Got More Talent	Indosiar	2010	Augie Fantinus (1)	1
Italy	Italia's Got Veramente Talent?	Sky Uno	2015	Rocco Tanica (6); Lucilla Agosti (6)	6
Italy	TuttiGiorni's Got Talent	TV8	2016	Rocco Tanica (7); Lucilla Agosti (7)	7
Ireland	Ireland's Got Mór Talent	TV3	2018	Glenda Gilson; James Kavanagh	2 series
Philippines	Pilipinas Got More Talent	ABS-CBN	2010	Billy Crawford; Luis Manzano; Toni Gonzaga	1
Serbia	I ja imam talenat!	RTS	2011	Una Senić (2); Unknown (3–4)	2–4
Thailand	Thailand's Got Talent Special	Channel 3	2016	Ketseptsawat Palakrawong; Na Ayutthaya	6
United Kingdom	Britain's Got More Talent	ITV2	2007	Stephen Mulhern	1-13
United Kingdom	Britain's Got Talent: Unseen	ITV Hub	2020, 2025, 2026	none	14, 18-19

=== Planet's/World's Got Talent around the world ===
Country	Name	Network	Premiere	Host(s)	Judges	Seasons and winners majority
Bulgaria	Най-доброто от световните таланти The best of the world talents	bTV	6 February 2014	Krasimir Radkov		1
China	巅峰之夜; World's Got Talent	Hunan Television	19 April 2019	Eliza Liang; Wong Cho-lam	David Foster; Coco Lee^{†} Wu Junmei; Xie Na	1: Wu Zhengdan & Wei Baohua (24, shoulder ballet)
Slovenia	Cel Svet Ima Talent	POP TV	17 November 2015	Peter Poles; Vid Valič		1
Spain	Got Talent: Lo Mejor del Mundo	Telecinco	2 June 2020	Santi Millán		6
United Kingdom	Planet's Got Talent	ITV	17 January 2015	Warwick Davis		2

=== The Champions/All Stars around the world ===
Country/region	Name	Network	Premiere	Judges	Host(s)	Corresponding seasons
Spain	Got Talent España: All-Stars	Telecinco	15 April 2023	Edurne; Paula Echevarría; Risto Mejide	Santi Millán	1
United Kingdom	Britain's Got Talent: The Champions	ITV	31 August 2019	David Walliams; Alesha Dixon; Amanda Holden; Simon Cowell	Ant & Dec	1
United States	America's Got Talent: The Champions	NBC	7 January 2019	Simon Cowell; Heidi Klum; Howie Mandel; Mel B (1); Alesha Dixon (2)	Terry Crews	2
United States	America's Got Talent: All-Stars	NBC	2 January 2023	Simon Cowell; Heidi Klum; Howie Mandel	Terry Crews	1

=== Battle of the Judges around the world ===
Country/region	Name	Network	Premiere	Judges	Host(s)	Seasons
France	La France a un incroyable talent: La Bataille du Jury	M6	23 June 2020	Éric Antoine; Hélène Ségara; Marianne James; Sugar Sammy	David Ginola	1
Philippines	Battle of the Judges	GMA	15 July 2023	Boy Abunda; Jose Manalo; Annette Gozon-Valdes; Bea Alonzo	Alden Richards	1
Portugal	A Batalha dos Jurados	RTP1	14 June 2020	Manuel Moura dos Santos; Cuca Roseta; Sofia Escobar; Pedro Tochas	Sílvia Alberto	1
United States	America's Got Talent: Fantasy League	NBC	1 January 2024	Simon Cowell; Mel B Heidi Klum; Howie Mandel	Terry Crews	1

=== Other spin-offs ===
Country/region	Name	Network	Premiere	Judges	Host(s)	Corresponding seasons
France	La France a un incroyable talent: Le Rappel	M6	21 December 2011	Dave; Sophie Edelstein; Gilbert Rozon	Alex Goude; Sandrine Corman	1
France	La France a un incroyable talent: La Finale des Champions	M6	17 December 2013	Dave; Andrée Deissenberg; Sophie Edelstein; Gilbert Rozon	Alex Goude; Sandrine Corman	1
United Kingdom	Britain's Got Talent: The Ultimate Magician	ITV	18 December 2022	Penn Jillette; Amanda Holden; Alesha Dixon; David Walliams	Stephen Mulhern	1
United States	America's Got Talent: Extreme	NBC	21 February 2022	Simon Cowell; Nikki Bella; Travis Pastrana	Terry Crews	1
United States	Tengo Talento, Mucho Talento	Estrella TV	2010	Ana Barbara; India Maria Clone; Pepe Garza	Denisse Padilla; Luis Coronel	16
United States	Tengo Talento, Mucho Talento Kids	Estrella TV	2025			1
United States	Tengo Talento, Mucho Talento Nueva Era	Estrella TV	2025			1
United States	Tengo Talento, Mucho Talento Mundial	Estrella TV	2026			1
