= Big Brother Célébrités season 5 =

Big Brother Célébrités
- Season 5
- Presented by: Marie-Mai Bouchard
- No. of days: 85
- No. of houseguests: 16
- Winner: Sinem Kara
- Runner-up: Frédérique Turgeon
- Public's Favourite Housemate: Liliane Blanco-Binette
- No. of episodes: 40

Release
- Original network: Noovo; Crave
- Original release: January 12 – April 6, 2025

Big Brother Célébrités: Champions vs. Recrues is the fifth season of Big Brother Célébrités premiered on 12 January 2025 on Noovo. Singer Marie-Mai Bouchard returned to host.

After another the success of the previous edition, Bell Media confirmed on March 31, 2024 that another season of the show would air in the winter of 2025. Shortly afterwards, it was also revealed that both returning players and new players would compete against each other this season.

== Housemates ==
The 8 champion housemates were revealed on 10 December 2024, while the 8 new recrues where revealed on 12 January 2024 before the premiere.

Celebrity	Age on entry	Hometown	Notability	Day entered	Day exited	Result
Sinem Kara	34	Saint-Jean-sur-Richelieu	Actress and comedian	1	85	Winner
Frédérique Turgeon Season 4	25	Montreal	Paralympic skier	1	85	Runner-up
Coco Belliveau [fr] Season 3	33	Perth-Andover	Comedian, actress, and rapper	1	85	Evicted
Liliane Blanco-Binette Season 3		Gatineau/Montreal	Comedian and content creator	1	85	Evicted
Emy Lalune		Montreal	Content creator	1	78	Evicted
François Lambert [fr] Season 1	57	Montreal	Entrepreneur	1	71	Evicted
Jean-Thomas Jobin [fr] Season 1	49	Sainte-Foy	Comedian	50	64	Evicted
Jean-Thomas Jobin [fr] Season 1	49	Sainte-Foy	Comedian	1	50	Evicted
Fabiola Nyrva Aladin	35	Repentigny	Actress and comedian	1	57	Evicted
Simon Boulerice [fr]	42	Saint-Rémi/Montreal	Author, actor, screenwriter, and host	1	43	Evicted
Tom-Éliot Girard	24	Montreal	Actor, singer, and host	1	36	Evicted
Martin Vachon [fr] Season 2	39	Saint-Jean-sur-Richelieu	Actor and comedian	1	36	Evicted
Valérie Roberts	38	Montreal	Host, columnist, and author	1	29	Evicted
Danick Martineau Season 4	26	Montreal	Comedian	1	22	Evicted
Barnev Valsaint			Singer	1	15	Evicted
Stéphanie Harvey Season 2	38	Quebec City	Professional gamer and video game developer	1	15	Evicted
Tammy Verge [fr]	49	Quebec City	Actress and host	1	8	Evicted

== Voting history ==
	Week 1	Week 2		Week 3	Week 4		Week 5		Week 6	Week 7	Week 8	Week 9	Week 10	Week 11	Week 12	
	Week 1	Day 8	Day 15	Week 3	Day 22	Day 26	Outside	Inside	Week 6	Week 7	Week 8	Week 9	Week 10	Week 11	Day 85	Finale
Boss of the House	Danick; Fabiola	Barnev	(none)	Sinem	Martin		Frédérique	Emy	~~Fabiola~~; Frédérique	François	Emy	François	(none)			(none)
Nominations (pre-veto)	François; Tammy	Frédérique; Simon	(none)	Danick; Valérie	Coco; Liliane	Liliane; Tom-Éliot	Fabiola; Martin	Coco; Tom-Éliot	Jean-Thomas; Simon	Emy; Jean-Thomas	Fabiola; François	Emy; Jean-Thomas	François; Frédérique	Emy; Sinem	Liliane; Sinem	(none)
Veto Winner	François	Frédérique	(none)	Martin	Liliane	Coco	Liliane	François	Emy	Fabiola	Coco	Emy	Frédérique	Sinem	Frédérique	(none)
Nominations (post-veto)	Stéphanie; Tammy	Simon; Stéphanie	(none)	Danick; Valérie	Liliane; Tom-Éliot	Tom-Éliot; Valérie	Fabiola; Martin	Coco; Tom-Éliot	Coco; Simon	Emy; Jean-Thomas	Fabiola; François	Coco; Jean-Thomas	Emy; François	Coco; Emy	Coco; Liliane	(none)
Sinem	Stéphanie	Stéphanie; Stéphanie	No voting	Boss of the House	Nominations void	Valérie	Martin	Ineligible	Simon	Jean-Thomas	Fabiola	Ineligible	Emy	Ineligible	Ineligible	Winner
Frédérique	Tammy	Stéphanie	No voting	Danick	Nominations void	Valérie	Boss of the House	Ineligible	Boss of the House	Jean-Thomas	Fabiola	Jean-Thomas	Ineligible	Emy	Coco; Liliane	Runner-up
Coco	Tammy	Stéphanie	No voting	Danick	Nominations void	Valérie	Ineligible	Nominated	Nominated	Jean-Thomas	Fabiola; Fabiola	Nominated	François	Nominated	Evicted (Day 85)	Sinem
Liliane	Tammy	Stéphanie	No voting	Danick	Nominated	Valérie	Martin	Ineligible	Simon; Simon	Jean-Thomas	Fabiola	Jean-Thomas	François	Emy	Evicted (Day 85)	Sinem
Emy	Stéphanie	Stéphanie	No voting	Danick	Nominations void	Valérie	Ineligible	Boss of the House	Simon	Nominated	Boss of the House	Coco	Nominated	Nominated	Evicted (Day 78)	Sinem
François	Tammy	Stéphanie	No voting	Danick	Nominations void	Valérie	Ineligible	Tom-Éliot	Simon	Boss of the House	Nominated	Boss of the House	Nominated	Evicted (Day 71)		Frédérique
Jean-Thomas	Stéphanie	Simon	No voting	Danick	Nominations void	Valérie	Ineligible	Tom-Éliot	Simon	Nominated	François	Nominated	Evicted (Day 64)			Sinem
Fabiola	Co-Boss of the House	Stéphanie	Nominated	Danick	Nominations void	Valérie	Nominated	Ineligible	Simon	Emy	Nominated	Evicted (Day 57)				Frédérique
Simon	Tammy	Nominated	No voting	Danick	Nominations void	Ineligible	Ineligible	Tom-Éliot	Nominated	Evicted (Day 43)						Sinem
Tom-Éliot	Stéphanie	Stéphanie	No voting	Danick	Nominated		Ineligible	Nominated	Evicted (Day 36)							
Martin	Tammy	Simon	No voting	Danick	Boss of the House		Nominated	Evicted (Day 36)								
Valérie	Tammy	Stéphanie	No voting	Nominated	Nominations void	Nominated	Evicted (Day 29)									
Danick	Co-Boss of the House	Stéphanie	No voting	Nominated	Evicted (Day 22)											
Barnev	Stéphanie	Boss of the House	Nominated	Evicted (Day 15)												
Stéphanie	Nominated	Nominated	Evicted (Day 15)													
Tammy	Nominated	Evicted (Day 8)														
Notes	1	2,3	4	5	(none)	6,7	8		9,10	11,12	13	14,15	16,17		16,18	19
Evicted	Tammy; 7 of 12 votes to evict	Stéphanie; 11 of 13 votes to evict	Barnev; Evicted by Competition	Danick; 10 of 10 votes to evict	None	Valérie; 8 of 8 votes to evict	Martin; 2 of 2 votes to evict	Tom-Éliot; 3 of 3 votes to evict	Simon; 7 of 7 votes to evict	Jean-Thomas; 4 of 5 votes to evict	Fabiola; 5 of 6 votes to evict	Jean-Thomas; 2 of 3 votes to evict	François; 2 of 3 votes to evict	Emy; 2 of 2 votes to evict	Liliane; Frédérique's choice to evict	Frédérique; 2 votes to win
Evicted	Tammy; 7 of 12 votes to evict	Stéphanie; 11 of 13 votes to evict	Barnev; Evicted by Competition	Danick; 10 of 10 votes to evict	None	Valérie; 8 of 8 votes to evict	Martin; 2 of 2 votes to evict	Tom-Éliot; 3 of 3 votes to evict	Simon; 7 of 7 votes to evict	Jean-Thomas; Won re-entry into game	Fabiola; 5 of 6 votes to evict	Jean-Thomas; 2 of 3 votes to evict	François; 2 of 3 votes to evict	Emy; 2 of 2 votes to evict	Coco; Frédérique's choice to evict	Sinem; 5 votes to win

=== Notes ===
- ^1: During Week 1, the Boss of the House competition was played in pairs, with the winning pair becoming Co-HOHs. The two HOHs had to agree to nominate two people together. If a consensus was not reached, the two HOHs would instead become the two nominees.
- ^2: Every week, there are tasks that cause one houseguest to either lose their vote or gain an additional vote.
- ^3: During Week 2, Sinem won an extra vote.
- ^4: On Day 15, there was a Double Eviction. However, unlike normal double evictions, the evictee was determined by a "Chain of Safety" selection process. Beginning with Frédérique, the winner of the first immunity challenge, each housemate had to select another housemate to save until one person was left unselected, who would then become nominated. This was followed by a second safety chain, beginning with Coco, the winner of the second immunity challenge, with the second housemate left unselected also being nominated. The two nominees had to compete against each other in a head-to-head duel to determine who was eliminated.
- ^5: As the winner of the duel, Fabiola was immune this week.
- ^6: Coco used her Crystals to get "The Bloc" power up giving her the ability to veto one nominee from eviction or granting them the ability to add a third nominee. She chose to veto Liliane.
- ^7: During Week 4, Simon lost his vote to evict.
- ^8: Following Valérie's eviction, the HouseGuests were split into two groups of five that had no interaction for the entire week. One group would live in the main house while the other group would live in "The Camp." A full week of events played out for each group, with their own competitions, nominations, and evictions.
- ^9: Frédérique used her Crystals to get "The Boss" power up giving her the ability to either extend the powers of the Boss of the House for another week or to strip the Boss of the House of their powers. She chose to strip Fabiola's power giving her the power instead.
- ^10: During Week 6, Liliane won an extra vote.
- ^11: Jean-Thomas was nominated by the Temple of Crystals.
- ^12: During Week 7, the evictee had the opportunity to compete in a challenge. If they successfully did so, they would re-enter the game as a housemate and receive immunity for the following week. However, if they lost, they would be permanently evicted. Jean-Thomas won re-entry into the competition.
- ^13: During Week 8, Coco won an extra vote.
- ^14: Week 9 was the "invisible week", featuring both an Invisible HOH, Invisible Veto and Invisible Storm.
- ^15: During Week 9, Sinem lost her vote to evict.
- ^16: In the last 3 weeks of the game, the format was completely revamped:
  - Instead of the Head of Household deciding the two nominees, the housemates played in two Block Challenges. The housemate who finished in last would be automatically nominated.
  - Instead of playing in the Golden Power of Veto competition, the housemates compete for the Diamond Power of Veto. The holder would have the power to save one of the nominees and determine the replacement themselves.
  - During the Final 4, the two nominees that end up on the block at the end of the week were instantly evicted. The Diamond Power of Veto holder and one person of their choosing (effectively resulting from their Veto Choice) would both be in the finale.
- ^17: The winner of the Diamond Power of Veto was ineligible to vote to evict.
- ^18: As the winner of the Diamond Power of Veto in Week 12, Frédérique’s decision on the veto would effectively determine the final evictees.
- ^19: The Jury voted for the winner of Big Brother Célébrités: Champions vs. Recrues.
