= Big Brother in Canada =

The Big Brother television franchise has been broadcast under two different titles in Quebec, Canada:

- Loft Story the first incarnation of the franchise,
- Big Brother the second incarnation of the franchise.

Big Brother Canada may also refer to:

- Big Brother Canada the first Canadian English language incarnation of the franchise, third overall.

== See also ==
- Big Brother (disambiguation)
