= Big Brother Célébrités season 1 =

Big Brother Célébrités
- Season 1
- Presented by: Marie-Mai Bouchard
- No. of days: 92
- No. of houseguests: 15
- Winner: Jean-Thomas Jobin
- Runner-up: François Lambert
- Public's Favourite Housemate: Richardson Zéphir
- Companion show: Big Brother 7/7
- No. of episodes: 67

Release
- Original network: Noovo
- Original release: January 10 – April 11, 2021

Season chronology
- Next → Season 2

The first season of Big Brother Célébrités began airing on January 10, 2021. Based on the worldwide franchise of the same name, it saw fifteen "celebrity" housemates competing to win the show's grand prize. It is the third French language adaptation of the series to be held in Canada, following Loft Story (2003–09) and a civilian version of Big Brother (2010). Marie-Mai Bouchard served as the show's host during its thirteen-week run, concluding on 11 April 2021, when comedian Jean-Thomas Jobin was named the winner, winning $50,000 for himself, $50,000 to a charity of his choice, and a new automobile.

== Housemates ==
Celebrity	Age on entry	Residence	Notability	Day entered	Day exited	Result
Jean-Thomas Jobin	45	Quebec City	Comedian	1	92	Winner
François Lambert	53	Montreal	Entrepreneur	1	92	Runner-up
Kim Clavel	30	Crabtree	Boxer	1	92	Evicted
Camille Felton	21	Laval	Actress	71	85	Evicted
Camille Felton	21	Laval	Actress	1	71	Evicted
Richardson Zéphir	43	Laval	Actor and comedian	1	78	Evicted
Kevin Lapierre	30	Quebec City	TV reality star; Occupation Double participant	1	64	Evicted
Maxime Landry	33	Saint-Georges	Singer, Star Académie 2009 winner	1	57	Evicted
Emmanuel Auger	47	Quebec City	Actor	1	50	Evicted
Claude Bégin	36	Quebec City	Singer	1	43	Evicted
Lysandre Nadeau	25	Gaspé	YouTuber；Social media Influencer	1	43	Evicted
Varda Étienne	48	Montreal	TV host, author and columnist	1	36	Walked
Rita Baga/Jean-François Guèvremont	33	Boucherville	Drag queen; Canada's Drag Race season 1 runner-up	1	29	Evicted
Marie-Chantal Toupin	49	Montreal	Singer	1	22	Walked
Laurence Bareil	37	Trois-Rivières	TV host	1	15	Evicted
Geneviève Borne	52	Quebec City	TV host	1	8	Evicted

== Voting history ==
	Week 1	Week 2	Week 3	Week 4	Week 5	Week 6	Week 7	Week 8	Week 9	Week 10	Week 11	Week 12	Week 13	
	Week 1	Week 2	Week 3	Week 4	Week 5	Week 6	Week 7	Week 8	Week 9	Week 10	Week 11	Week 12	Day 92	Final
Boss of the House	François	Emmanuel	Claude	Emmanuel	Lysandre	Jean-Thomas	François	Kim	Camille	Kim	Jean-Thomas	Kim	Jean-Thomas	none
Nominations (pre-veto)	Claude; Marie-Chantal	Kevin; Laurence	Marie-Chantal; Varda	Lysandre; Rita	Emmanuel; Varda	Claude; Lysandre; Maxime	Emmanuel; Kevin	Camille; Maxime	Kim; Richardson	Camille; Richardson	François; Kim	Camille; Jean-Thomas	François; Kim	none
Veto Winner	Marie-Chantal	Richardson	Camille	Lysandre	Lysandre	Camille	François	Kevin	Camille	Richardson	Kim	François	none	none
Veto Winner	Marie-Chantal	Richardson	François	Lysandre	Lysandre	Camille	François	Kevin	Camille	Richardson	Kim	François	none	none
Nominations (post-veto)	Claude; Geneviève	Kevin; Laurence	Marie-Chantal; Varda	Camille; Rita	Emmanuel; Varda	Claude; Lysandre; Richardson	Emmanuel; Kevin	Maxime; Richardson	Kevin; Kim	Camille; Jean-Thomas	François; Richardson	Camille; Jean-Thomas	none	none
Jean-Thomas	Geneviève	Laurence	No voting	Rita	No voting	Boss of the House	Emmanuel	Maxime	Kevin	Nominated	Boss of the House	Nominated	Kim	Winner (Day 92)
François	Boss of the House	Laurence	No voting	Rita	No voting	Claude; Lysandre	Boss of the House	Maxime	Kevin	Camille	Nominated	Camille	Nominated	Runner-up (Day 92)
Kim	Geneviève	Laurence	No voting	Rita	No voting	Claude; Lysandre	Emmanuel	Boss of the House	Nominated	Boss of the House	Richardson	Boss of the House	Evicted (Day 92)	Jean-Thomas
Camille	Geneviève	Laurence	No voting	Nominated	No voting	Claude; Lysandre	Emmanuel	Richardson	Boss of the House	Nominated	Richardson	Nominated	Evicted (Day 85)	Jean-Thomas
Richardson	Geneviève	Kevin	No voting	Camille	No voting	Nominated	Emmanuel	Nominated	Kevin	Camille	Nominated	Evicted (Day 78)		Jean-Thomas
Kevin	Geneviève	Nominated	No voting	Rita	No voting	Claude; Lysandre	Nominated	Maxime	Nominated	Evicted (Day 64)				Jean-Thomas
Maxime	Geneviève	Kevin	No voting	Camille	No voting	Claude; Lysandre	Emmanuel	Nominated	Evicted (Day 57)					Jean-Thomas
Emmanuel	Geneviève	Boss of the House	No voting	Boss of the House	Nominated	Claude; Lysandre	Nominated	Evicted (Day 50)						Jean-Thomas
Claude	Nominated	Laurence	Boss of the House	Rita	No voting	Nominated	Evicted (Day 43)							Jean-Thomas
Lysandre	Geneviève	Laurence	No voting	Rita	Boss of the House	Nominated	Evicted (Day 43)							Jean-Thomas
Varda	Geneviève	Kevin	Nominated	Camille	Nominated	Walked (Day 36)								Jean-Thomas
Rita	Geneviève	Kevin	No voting	Nominated	Evicted (Day 29)									Jean-Thomas
Marie-Chantal	Geneviève	Laurence	Nominated	Walked (Day 22)										Relinquished
Laurence	Geneviève	Nominated	Evicted (Day 15)											Jean-Thomas
Geneviève	Nominated	Evicted (Day 8)												Jean-Thomas
Notes	none		1, 2	none	3	4	none	5				none	6	7
Walked	none		Marie-Chantal	none	Varda	none								
Evicted	Geneviève; 12 of 12 votes to evict	Laurence; 7 of 11 votes to evict	No eviction	Rita; 6 of 9 votes to evict	No eviction	Claude; 6 of 6 votes to evict	Emmanuel; 5 of 5 votes to evict	Maxime; 3 of 4 votes to evict	Kevin; 3 of 3 votes to evict	Camille; 2 of 2 votes to evict	Richardson; 2 of 2 votes to evict	Camille; François's choice to evict	Kim; Jean-Thomas's choice to evict	François; 0 votes to win
Evicted	Geneviève; 12 of 12 votes to evict	Laurence; 7 of 11 votes to evict	No eviction	Rita; 6 of 9 votes to evict	No eviction	Lysandre; 6 of 6 votes to evict	Emmanuel; 5 of 5 votes to evict	Maxime; 3 of 4 votes to evict	Kevin; Lost re-entry into game	Camille; Won re-entry into game	Richardson; Lost re-entry into game	Camille; François's choice to evict	Kim; Jean-Thomas's choice to evict	Jean-Thomas; 12 votes to win

=== Notes ===
- ^1: On Day 15, a Mystery Box appeared in the house. To open the box, housemates had to solve an equation. If they answered incorrectly, they would not be able to guess anymore. Camille guessed the number correctly and was awarded a Power of Veto to use on one of the nominees. She also earned immunity for herself but was not able to compete in the Power of Veto competition.
- ^2: As a result of Marie-Chantal deciding to walk from the game, the planned eviction for Day 22 was cancelled.
- ^3: As a result of Varda walking from the game, the planned eviction for Day 36 was cancelled.
- ^4: Week 6 was "Red Week". The Boss of the House would have to nominate three housemates and the Power of Veto was required to be used. On eviction night, the voting housemates would each vote for which two of the three housemates they wished to evict, and the two with the most votes left the house.
- ^5: Over the next four weeks, following the vote, the evicted housemate was given the opportunity to compete in a redemption challenge. Success meant a return to the game, while failure meant their eviction stood. On Day 57, Maxime was evicted after declining to participate in the redemption challenge. On Day 64, Kevin was evicted after failing the redemption challenge. On Day 71, Camille successfully completed her redemption challenge, returned to the house and was immune from eviction the following week. On Day 78, Richardson failed his redemption challenge and was evicted from the house.
- ^6: The final Boss of the House competition was a three-part contest that took place over the course of the final week in the house. The winner of Part 1 would automatically advance to Part 3 of the competition. The two housemates who did not win Part 1 would compete Part 2 of the competition. The winners of the first two challenges would compete in Part 3 to determine the final Boss of the House. They would then cast the final vote to evict, with that evicted housemate becoming the last member of the jury.
- ^7: During the finale, the jury, consisting of the previously evicted ex-housemates, voted for the person they wanted to win. Marie-Chantal elected not to participate in the vote.

== Ratings ==
Ratings of eviction shows are taken from Numeris.

No.	Aired date	Total viewers (AMA in millions)	Rank (Week)	Source
1	January 10, 2021	0.781	30	
2	January 17, 2021	<0.718	>30	
3	January 24, 2021	0.740	30	
4	January 31, 2021	0.760	28	
5	February 7, 2021	<0.722	>30	
6	February 14, 2021	0.738	28	
7	February 21, 2021	<0.686	>30	
8	February 28, 2021	<0.699	>30	
9	March 7, 2021	0.702	29	
10	March 14, 2021	<0.653	>30	
11	March 21, 2021	0.687	27	
12	March 28, 2021	0.667	29	
13	April 4, 2021	<0.597	>30	
14	April 11, 2021	0.717	17	

- Four episodes of daily shows Big Brother Célébrités Quotidienne from 22 March to 25 March 2021 combined ranked thirtieth place, received 0.637 of total viewers.
