= Loft Story =

Loft Story refers to the French adaptation of the reality TV show Big Brother:

- Loft Story (Canadian TV series), in Quebec, Canada
- Loft Story (French TV series), in France
