= Big Brother Célébrités season 2 =

Big Brother Célébrités
- Season 2
- Presented by: Marie-Mai Bouchard
- No. of days: 92
- No. of houseguests: 17
- Winner: Stephanie Harvey
- Runner-up: Éléonore Lagacé
- Public's Favourite Housemate: Claudia Bouvette
- Companion shows: Big Brother 7/7; Big Brother : Les gérants d’estrade

Release
- Original network: Noovo; Vrak
- Original release: January 9 – April 10, 2022

Season chronology
- ← Previous; Season 1 Next → Season 3

The second season of Big Brother Célébrités premiered on 9 January 2022 on Noovo. Singer Marie-Mai Bouchard returned to host. Following the success of the first season, Noovo announced plans for a second season in July 2021.

Changes this season included the house being moved from its original home, a mansion on Île-Bizard retrofitted for the show, to a custom-built home in a soundstage in the Montreal borough of Anjou. The house is 16,000 square feet large, fitted with 69 cameras and 61 one-way mirrors. In addition, the winner will no longer be decided by all previously evicted housemates, but a jury of a determined number of recently evicted ex-housemates, keeping in line with the format used in the United States and English-speaking Canada. Also new this season is a weekly aftershow: Big Brother: Les gérants d'estrade (English: Big Brother: Stage Managers). Airing on Noovo immediately following the live eviction, the aftershow features commentary on the week that was and the progress of the celebrity housemates thus far. It is hosted by Kim Rusk and Jean-Thomas Jobin, both winners of previous Big Brother series, respectively Loft Story season 3 and Big Brother Célébrités season 1.

== Housemates ==
The housemate identities were fully revealed hours before the premiere of the show. Hugo Barrette was initially named as a replacement for Stéphane Fallu—the latter having tested positive for COVID-19 during the pre-show sequester and slated to no longer participate—but host Marie-Mai announced on the premiere that Stéphane would enter the house one week later on Day 8 as the 17th housemate.

Celebrity	Age on entry	Hometown	Notability	Day entered	Day exited	Result
Stephanie Harvey	35	Quebec City	Video game developer, retired professional gaming champion	1	92	Winner
Éléonore Lagacé	24	Montréal	Singer, musical theatre actress, La Voix (season 2) quarterfinalist	1	92	Runner-up
Hugo Barrette	30	Les Îles-de-la-Madeleine	Olympic cyclist	1	92	Evicted
Tranna Wintour	34	Montreal	Anglophone stand-up comic	1	85	Evicted
Claudia Bouvette	26	Bromont	Singer-songwriter, actress, Mixmania 2 winner	1	78	Evicted
Martin Vachon	36	Montreal	Stand-up comic and comedian	1	71	Evicted
Lysanne Richard	40	Chambly	High diver	1	64	Evicted
Eddy King	39	Goussainville, France	Stand-up comic	1	57	Evicted
Guylaine Guay	52	Montreal	Comedian, TV & radio host, author	1	50	Evicted
Catherine "Peach" Paquin	26	Blainville	Content creator and influencer, nurse, OD: Grèce winner	1	43	Evicted
Pierre-Luc "PL" Cloutier	35	Montreal	YouTuber and content creator	1	43	Evicted
Marc-Antoine Dequoy	27	Montreal	Cornerback for the Montreal Alouettes	1	36	Evicted
Michelle Desrochers	27	Châteauguay	Stand-up comic	1	29	Evicted
Karl Walcott	30	L'Île-Perrot	Actor	1	22	Evicted
Valérie Carpentier	28	Trois-Rivières	Singer, La Voix (season 1) winner	1	16	Walked
Stéphane Fallu	51	Chambly	Stand-up comic, TV & radio host	8	15	Evicted
Sébastien "Seb" Plante	51	Quebec City	Musician, frontman of rock band Les Respectables	1	8	Evicted

== COVID-19 in the house ==
The ongoing COVID-19 pandemic, particularly the ongoing fifth wave caused by the highly transmissible Omicron variant affected the early stages of the game.

Before entering the house, the 16 original housemates were sequestered (commensurate with the general format of the Big Brother franchise to cut off participants from any communication with the outside world for a period of time before entering the house) and subject to several tests to detect for the virus that causes COVID-19. As a result of these tests, Stéphane Fallu tested positive and was immediately quarantined. Though it was initially reported that he would no longer take part—his spot replaced by Hugo Barrette—it was later announced Fallu would enter the house as the 17th housemate; he entered the house on Day 8.

Shortly before Stéphane's entry into the house on Day 8, after exhibiting symptoms, Eddy King tested positive for COVID-19 and was immediately isolated from the rest of the house. However, he was still an active housemate, meaning he could still be nominated and evicted. On Day 11, Martin Vachon, Michelle Desrochers, Valérie Carpentier, Lysanne Richard, Stéphanie Harvey, & Tranna Wintour all tested positive for the virus and were all immediately isolated in the Head of House room.

All affected housemates fully recovered and none were taken to hospital or removed from the game.

== The Condemned (Have-Nots) ==
	Week 1	Week 2	Week 3	Week 4	Week 5	Week 6	Week 7	Week 8	Week 9	Week 10	Week 11	Week 12	Week 13
Condemned	none					Catherine, Claudia, Éléonore, Lysanne	Stéphanie, ~~Guylaine~~, Martin, Eddy	none					

== Voting history ==
	Week 1	Week 2	Week 3	Week 4	Week 5	Week 6		Week 7	Week 8	Week 9	Week 10	Week 11	Week 12	Week 13	
	Week 1	Week 2	Week 3	Week 4	Week 5	Day 36	Day 43	Week 7	Week 8	Week 9	Week 10	Week 11	Week 12	Day 92	Final
Boss of the House	Michelle	PL	Marc-Antoine	Lysanne	Claudia	Martin	Stephanie	Claudia	Éléonore	Martin	Claudia	Hugo	Stephanie	Stephanie	none
Nominations (pre-veto)	Éléonore; Stephanie	Eddy; Stéphane	Lysanne; Stephanie	Catherine; Claudia	Marc-Antoine; Martin	Catherine; Claudia	Claudia; Éléonore	Guylaine; Stephanie	Lysanne; Stephanie	Éléonore; Stephanie	Stephanie; Tranna	Claudia; Stephanie; Tranna	Éléonore; Tranna	Éléonore; Hugo	none
Veto Winner	Hugo	Eddy (Karl)	Stephanie (Karl)	Lysanne	Martin	Catherine	Claudia	Eddy	Tranna	Stephanie	Tranna	Stephanie	Éléonore	none	none
Nominations (post-veto)	Éléonore; Sébastien	Éléonore; Stéphane	Karl; Lysanne	Claudia; Michelle	Guylaine; Marc-Antoine	Claudia; PL	Catherine; Éléonore	Guylaine; Stephanie	Eddy; Stephanie	~~Claudia~~; Lysanne; Stephanie	Martin; Stephanie	Claudia; Éléonore; Tranna	Hugo; Tranna	none	none
Stephanie	Sébastien	Stéphane	Lysanne	Claudia	Marc-Antoine	PL	Boss of the House	Nominated	Nominated	Nominated	Nominated	Claudia	Boss of the House	Hugo	Winner (Day 92)
Éléonore	Nominated	Nominated	Karl	Michelle	Guylaine	PL	Nominated	Guylaine	Boss of the House	Lysanne	Martin	Nominated	Tranna	Nominated	Runner-up (Day 92)
Hugo	Sébastien	Stéphane	Karl	Michelle	Guylaine	PL	Catherine	Stephanie	Eddy	Lysanne	Stephanie	Boss of the House	Nominated	Evicted (Day 92)	Éléonore
Tranna	Sébastien	Stéphane	Karl	Michelle	Marc-Antoine	Claudia	Catherine	Guylaine	Eddy	Stephanie	Martin	Nominated	Nominated	Evicted (Day 85)	Stephanie
Claudia	Sébastien	Stéphane	Karl	Nominated	Boss of the House	Nominated	Catherine	Boss of the House	Eddy	Lysanne	Boss of the House	Nominated	Evicted (Day 78)		Éléonore
Martin	Sébastien	Stéphane	Karl	Claudia	Guylaine	Boss of the House	Éléonore	Guylaine	Stephanie	Boss of the House	Nominated	Evicted (Day 71)			Stephanie
Lysanne	Sébastien	Stéphane	Nominated	Boss of the House	Marc-Antoine	PL	Éléonore	Guylaine	Eddy	Nominated	Evicted (Day 64)				Stephanie
Eddy	Sébastien	Stéphane	Lysanne	Michelle	Marc-Antoine	PL	Catherine	Guylaine	Nominated	Evicted (Day 57)					Éléonore
Guylaine	Sébastien	Stéphane	Karl	Michelle	Nominated	PL	Éléonore	Nominated	Evicted (Day 50)						Stephanie
Catherine	Sébastien	Stéphane	Karl	Michelle	Guylaine	PL	Nominated	Evicted (Day 43)							
PL	Sébastien	Boss of the House	Karl	Michelle	Marc-Antoine	Nominated	Evicted (Day 43)								
Marc-Antoine	Sébastien	Stéphane	Boss of the House	Michelle	Nominated	Evicted (Day 36)									
Michelle	Boss of the House	Stéphane	Karl	Nominated	Evicted (Day 29)										
Karl	Éléonore	Stéphane	Nominated	Evicted (Day 22)											
Valérie	Sébastien	Stéphane	Walked (Day 16)												
Stéphane	Not in House	Nominated	Evicted (Day 15)												
Sébastien	Nominated	Evicted (Day 8)													
Notes	1	2		none	3	4		none		5	none	6	none		
Walked	none		Valérie	none											
Evicted	Sébastien; 12 of 13 votes to evict	Stéphane; 13 of 13 votes to evict	Karl; 9 of 11 votes to evict	Michelle; 8 of 10 votes to evict	Marc-Antoine; 5 of 9 votes to evict	PL; 7 of 8 votes to evict	Catherine; 4 of 7 votes to evict	Guylaine; 5 of 6 votes to evict	Eddy; 4 of 5 votes to evict	Lysanne; 3 of 4 votes to evict	Martin; 2 of 3 votes to evict	Claudia; Stéphanie's choice to evict	Tranna; Éléonore's choice to evict	Hugo; Stéphanie's choice to evict	Éléonore; 3 votes to win
Evicted	Sébastien; 12 of 13 votes to evict	Stéphane; 13 of 13 votes to evict	Karl; 9 of 11 votes to evict	Michelle; 8 of 10 votes to evict	Marc-Antoine; 5 of 9 votes to evict	PL; 7 of 8 votes to evict	Catherine; 4 of 7 votes to evict	Guylaine; 5 of 6 votes to evict	Eddy; 4 of 5 votes to evict	Lysanne; 3 of 4 votes to evict	Martin; 2 of 3 votes to evict	Claudia; Stéphanie's choice to evict	Tranna; Éléonore's choice to evict	Hugo; Stéphanie's choice to evict	Stephanie; 4 votes to win

=== Notes ===
- ^1 : The first 16 housemates were divided into two groups to compete in the first Boss of the House competition of the season. Each group was further divided into pairs. The winning pairs would be immune for the week, and would then unanimously decide who amongst themselves would be the first Boss.
- ^2 : During Weeks 2 and 3, Karl was selected to play in the Veto competition by Eddy and Stéphanie as their stand-in, as they were both ineligible to compete because they contracted COVID-19. He won both competitions but the official Veto winners were Eddy and Stéphanie. However, as he was not the official holder of the Veto, Karl was still eligible to be named the replacement nominee.
- ^3 : Week 5 was Invisible Week, in which all power competitions were held privately, and the power holders remained anonymous. Claudia became the invisible Boss of The House and had to nominate in secret; her access to the luxury bedroom was prohibited. Martin won the invisible Veto and secretly used it on himself. Additionally, the result of the eviction vote was not revealed to the housemates.
- ^4 : This week was a double eviction week. Following the first eviction, the remaining housemates played a week's worth of games, including Boss of the House and Veto competitions, and Nomination, Veto and Eviction ceremonies, during the remainder of the live show, culminating in a second eviction for the week.
- ^5 : Martin won the "Safety for an ally" power and used it on Claudia. After she was named Martin's replacement nominee, she was revealed as safe for the week.
- ^6 : Because of the "Box of Trouble" twist, a third nominee was added to this week. This third nominee was chosen by a house vote between Claudia and Éléonore. The house chose Claudia.
- ^6 : With 3 nominees & Boss of House not being able to vote, only Stéphanie was able to cast a valid eviction vote.
