= Big Brother Célébrités season 3 =

Season of Big Brother Célébrités

Big Brother Célébrités
- Season 3
- Presented by: Marie-Mai Bouchard
- No. of days: 85
- No. of houseguests: 16
- Winner: Mona de Grenoble
- Runner-up: Liliane Blanco-Binette
- No. of episodes: 61

Release
- Original network: Noovo
- Original release: January 8 – April 2, 2023

Season chronology
- ← Previous; Season 2

The third season of Big Brother Célébrités premiered on 8 January 2023 on Noovo. Singer Marie-Mai Bouchard returned to host.

After two successful celebrity editions, Bell Media confirmed on June 9, 2022 that another season of the show would air in the winter of 2023.

== Housemates ==
Celebrity	Age on entry	Hometown	Notability	Day entered	Day exited	Result
Mona de Grenoble/Alexandre Aussant		Saint-Jean-sur-Richelieu	Drag Queen and comedian	Day 1	Day 85	Winner
Liliane Blanco-Binette		Gatineau; Montreal	Comedian and content creator	Day 1	Day 85	Runner-up
Coco Belliveau	33	Perth-Andover	Comedian, actress, and rapper	Day 1	Day 85	Evicted
Jemmy Echaquan Dubé	31	Manawan; Kanata	Actress, director, activist, and content streamer	Day 1	Day 79	Evicted
Korine Côté	42	Laval	Comedian	Day 1	Day 71	Evicted
Natalie Choquette	64	Tokyo; Montreal	Singer	Day 1	Day 64	Evicted
Marianne Verville	30	Saint-Lambert	Actress and host	Day 1	Day 57	Evicted
Marie-Christine Lavoie			Designer, entrepreneur, animator, designer, producer, and artist	Day 1	Day 57	Walked
Zoé Duval	25	St-JérômeMontreal	Influencer, content creator, and comedian	Day 1	Day 50	Evicted
LeLouis Courchesne		Montreal	Actor, comedian, and author	Day 1	Day 43	Evicted
Anas Hassouna			Comedian	Day 1	Day 43	Evicted
Naïla Louidort		Haiti	Actress	Day 1	Day 36	Evicted
Martin Larocque	55	Chillicothe, Ohio	Actor and comedian	Day 1	Day 29	Evicted
Alexandre Despatie	39	Laval; Montreal	Olympic diver, sports commentator, and TV host	Day 1	Day 22	Evicted
Benoît Gagnon	52	Saguenay; Chicoutimi	Radio host	Day 1	Day 15	Evicted
Jérémy Demay	40	Paris; Montreal	Comedian and columnist	Day 1	Day 8	Evicted

== Voting history ==
	Week 1	Week 2	Week 3	Week 4		Week 5		Week 6	Week 7	Week 8		Week 9		Week 10	Week 11	Week 12	
	Week 1	Week 2	Week 3	Day 22	Day 29	Day 33	Day 36	Week 6	Week 7	Day 50	Day 57		Day 64	Week 10	Week 11	Day 85	Final
Boss of the House	Jemmy	Natalie	Korine	LeLouis	none	Liliane		Zoé	Marianne	Coco	Jemmy	Korine		Liliane	Mona	Liliane	none
Nominations (pre-veto)	Alexandre; Marie-Christine	Benoît; Martin	Alexandre; Marie-Christine	Naïla; Natalie	none	Coco; Marie-Christine	Marianne; Marie-Christine	Anas; LeLouis; Marie-Christine	Mona; Zoé	Marianne; Natalie	Korine; Mona	Liliane; Natalie	Mona; Natalie	Jemmy; Korine	Coco; Jemmy	Coco; Mona	none
Veto Winner	Alexandre	Naïla	Alexandre	Liliane	none	Coco	Jemmy	Coco	Marie-Christine	Natalie	Korine	Liliane	Mona	Mona	Mona	none	none
Nominations (post-veto)	Jérémy; Marie-Christine	Benoît; Martin	Marie-Christine; Martin	Alexandre; Naïla	none	Marianne; Marie-Christine	Anas; Naïla	Anas; Jemmy; LeLouis	Mona; Zoé	Jemmy; Marianne	Marianne; Mona	Mona; Natalie	Coco; Natalie	Jemmy; Korine	Coco; Jemmy	none	none
Mona	Jérémy	Benoît	Martin	Alexandre	No voting	Nominations Void	Naïla	Anas; Jemmy	Nominated	Nominations Void	Nominated	Nominated	Natalie	Korine	Boss of the House	Nominated	Winner (Day 85)
Liliane	Jérémy	Benoît	Martin	Naïla	No voting	Boss of the House		Anas; Jemmy	Zoé	Nominations Void	Marianne	Nominations Void	Natalie	Boss of the House	Jemmy	Coco	Runner-up (Day 85)
Coco	Jérémy	Benoît	Martin	Alexandre	No voting	Nominations Void	Naïla	Anas; LeLouis	Zoé	Boss of the House	Marianne	Nominations Void	Nominated	Korine	Nominated	Evicted (Day 85)	Mona
Jemmy	Boss of the House	Benoît	Martin	Alexandre	No voting	Nominations Void	Anas	Nominated	Zoé	Nominated	Boss of the House	Nominations Void	Natalie	Nominated	Nominated	Evicted (Day 78)	Liliane
Korine	Jérémy	Martin	Boss of the House	Naïla	No voting	Nominations Void	Naïla	Anas; LeLouis	Zoé	Nominations Void	Marianne	Boss of the House		Nominated	Evicted (Day 71)		Mona
Natalie	Jérémy	Boss of the House	Martin	Naïla	No voting	Nominations Void	Anas	Anas; LeLouis	Mona	Nominations Void	Mona	Nominated	Nominated	Evicted (Day 64)			Relinquished
Marianne	Jérémy	Benoît	Martin	Alexandre	No voting	Nominated	Naïla	Anas; LeLouis	Boss of the House	Nominated	Nominated	Evicted (Day 57)					Mona
Marie-Christine	Nominated	Martin	Nominated	Naïla	No voting	Nominated	Naïla	Anas; LeLouis	Mona	Walked (Day 57)							Mona
Zoé	Jérémy	Martin	Martin	Alexandre	No voting	Nominations Void	Anas	Boss of the House	Nominated	Evicted (Day 50)							
LeLouis	Jérémy	Benoît	Martin	Boss of the House	No voting	Nominations Void	Naïla	Nominated	Evicted (Day 43)								
Anas	Jérémy	Benoît	Martin	Alexandre	No voting	Nominations Void	Nominated	Nominated	Evicted (Day 43)								
Naïla	Jérémy	Benoît	Martin	Nominated	No voting	Nominations Void	Nominated	Evicted (Day 36)									
Martin	Marie-Christine	Nominated	Nominated	Naïla	Nominated	Evicted (Day 29)											
Alexandre	Marie-Christine	Martin	Martin	Nominated	Evicted (Day 29)												
Benoît	Marie-Christine	Nominated	Evicted (Day 15)														
Jérémy	Nominated	Evicted (Day 8)															
Notes	none	1		none		2		3	4	none							
Walked	none									Marie-Christine	none						
Evicted	Jeremy; 10 of 13 votes to evict	Benoît; 8 of 12 votes to evict	Martin; 11 of 11 votes to evict	Alexandre; 6 of 11 votes to evict	Martin; Evicted via competition	Nominations Void	Naïla; 5 of 9 votes to evict	Anas; 7 of 7 votes to evict	Zoé; 4 of 6 votes to evict	Nominations Void	Marianne; 3 of 4 votes to evict	Nominations Void	Natalie; 3 of 3 votes to evict	Korine; 2 of 2 votes to evict	Jemmy; Liliane's choice to evict	Coco; Liliane's choice to evict	Liliane; 1 votes to win
Evicted	Jeremy; 10 of 13 votes to evict	Benoît; 8 of 12 votes to evict	Martin; Won re-entry into game	Alexandre; 6 of 11 votes to evict	Martin; Evicted via competition	Nominations Void	Naïla; 5 of 9 votes to evict	LeLouis; 5 of 7 votes to evict	Zoé; 4 of 6 votes to evict	Nominations Void	Marianne; 3 of 4 votes to evict	Nominations Void	Natalie; 3 of 3 votes to evict	Korine; 2 of 2 votes to evict	Jemmy; Liliane's choice to evict	Coco; Liliane's choice to evict	Mona; 4 votes to win

=== Notes ===
- ^1: The evicted players of Week 2 and Week 3 faced in a duel. Martin won and returned back the game.
- ^2: Jemmy won the Double Power of Veto in Week 5 and could use it on both nominees.
- ^3: Week 6 was "Red Week". The Boss of the House would have to nominate three housemates and the Power of Veto was required to be used. On eviction night, the voting housemates would each vote for which two of the three housemates they wished to evict, and the two with the most votes left the house.
- ^4: Week 7 was Invisible Week, in which all power competitions were held privately, and the power holders remained anonymous. Marianne became the invisible Boss of The House and had to nominate in secret; her access to the luxury bedroom was prohibited. Marie-Christine won the invisible Veto and chose not to use it.
