= Big Brother Célébrités =

Quebec reality TV show

- Genre: Reality competition
- Based on: Big Brother by John de Mol Jr.
- Presented by: Marie-Mai Bouchard
- Country of origin: Canada (Quebec)
- Original language: French
- No. of seasons: 5
- No. of episodes: 368

Production
- Production company: Groupe Entourage

Original release
- Network: Noovo; Vrak
- Release: January 10, 2021 – present

Related
- Companion shows; Big Brother 7/7; Big Brother : Les gérants de l'estrade; Parent show; Big Brother (American TV series); Big Brother Canada; Related; Big Brother Quebec

Big Brother Célébrités is the Quebec celebrity reality game show based on the Dutch reality show of the same name, which was part of the wider Big Brother franchise.

Following the format originated by the American version of the show and used by the Canadian English edition, the show features a group of celebrity contestants, known as "Housemates" who live together in a specially constructed house that is isolated from the outside world. The housemates are continuously monitored during their stay in the house by live television cameras and personal audio microphones. Throughout the competition, the houseguests compete in challenges to win power and safety before voting to evict one another from the house, eliminating them from the competition. The last remaining houseguest wins the competition and is awarded the grand prize, which includes a personal cash prize, a donation to the charity of their choice and prizes from sponsors. The series is named after the fictional totalitarian dictator from George Orwell's 1949 novel Nineteen Eighty-Four.

The show launched in early 2021 on Noovo. Produced by Banijay and Groupe Entourage, it is hosted by singer Marie-Mai Bouchard. From 2027, the series is set to serve as a sister series to a reboot of the English-Canadian edition, set to air on CTV, with both produced by Entourage for their respective networks.

== History ==
Big Brother Célébrités is the third French-language adaptation of the Big Brother format in Canada, all of which have aired on the same network. A French-Canadian version of Loft Story, the France-produced version of the series, premiered in 2003 on the original incarnation of the Noovo network, Télévision Quatre-Saisons (TQS). Following TQS's rebranding to V in 2009, Loft Story was succeeded by an official Quebec-produced edition of Big Brother in 2010, featuring civilian contestants. This aired for only one season. On 24 August 2020, one week before the network's third rebranding to its present name of Noovo, Bell Media announced that a French-language celebrity version of Big Brother would start in the winter of 2020–2021. On 26 October 2020, it was announced that singer Marie-Mai Bouchard would host, fronting the premiere, weekly evictions, special live episodes and the final.

The first season premiered on 10 January 2021, and lasted for 13 weeks. The success of the show led to Noovo announcing a second season, which premiered on 9 January 2022.

=== Format ===
The format of the show follows the American version and the Canadian English version but with celebrity Housemates.

At the start of the week, a competition is held to determine the Patron de la maison (Head of the House). This person, in addition to being immune for the week and having access to a luxurious private suite, is also responsible for nominating two people for eviction. Following the nominations, the Véto (Veto) competition allows a select number of housemates to try to win the ability to either save one of the nominees from possible eviction (forcing the Patron de la maison to name a replacement nominee) or leave the nominations as is. The week culminates with a live eviction, where each celebrity housemate secretly casts their vote to evict one of the nominees. This process repeats itself until there are three people remaining, where a three-part competition to name the final Patron de la maison is held, with the winner guaranteed a spot in the Final 2, and the sole power to decide which of their opponents will join them. At the end, the one celebrity remaining (as determined by a vote from their evicted ex-housemates) will be crowned the winner.

Similar to other versions of Big Brother, twists may be introduced that may alter the normal proceedings of a typical week in the house. Double evictions (where two people are evicted on the same day), a competition to allow a previously-evicted housemate to return, immunity granted to more than just the Patron de la maison are some examples of twists that have been used in this version.

=== Companion shows ===
In addition to the main show, which airs Monday to Thursday, a daily show called Big Brother 7/7 airs on sister network Vrak. This program features unedited, never-before-seen moments in the house, post-eviction discussions with the housemates, as well as moments from the weekend (when the main show does not air).

Season 2 introduced a new spin-off show: Big Brother : Gérants d'estrade (English: Big Brother: Stage Managers). Also airing on Noovo immediately following the live eviction, the programme features commentary on the week that was and the progress of the celebrity housemates thus far.

=== The House ===
For the program's first season, the house that the celebrities lived was located in Île Bizard in the Montreal borough of L'Île-Bizard–Sainte-Geneviève, a 28,000 ft² (2601m²), three-floor mansion—the largest Big Brother house in the format's history, and one of the rare instances where the Big Brother house was an actual house instead of a custom-built habitat constructed on a soundstage—was retrofitted with 73 cameras.

For Season 2, due to the house used in Season 1 being put up for sale, the house reverted to a dwelling built on a soundstage, in line with other versions of the format. This house was 16,000 ft² large and was fitted with 69 cameras.

== Series overview ==
Season	Episodes	Days	Housemates	Winner	Runner-up	Final vote	Viewer's Favourite Player	Originally released	
Season	Episodes	Days	Housemates	Winner	Runner-up	Final vote	Viewer's Favourite Player	First released	Last released
1	67	92	15	Jean-Thomas Jobin	François Lambert	12-0 (Note: In Season 1, all previously evicted housemates (bar one) voted to choose the winner. From Season 2 onwards, a non sequestered jury decided the winner.)	Richardson Zéphir	January 10, 2021	April 11, 2021
2	78	92	17 (Note: Sixteen people were announced, but one housemate was removed from the lineup and replaced after testing positive for COVID-19. However, following the premiere event, that decision was overturned, and the housemate entered one week after the launch.)	Stephanie Harvey	Éléonore Lagacé	4-3	Claudia Bouvette	January 9, 2022	April 10, 2022
3	73	85	16	Mona de Grenoble	Liliane Blanco-Binette	4-1	Mona de Grenoble	January 8, 2023	April 2, 2023
4	75	85	16	Danick Martineau	Gabrielle Marion	4-3	Joëlle Paré-Beaulieu	January 7, 2024	March 31, 2024
5	75	85	16	Sinem Kara	Frédérique Turgeon	5-2	Liliane Blanco-Binette	January 12, 2025	April 6, 2025
6	56	78	16	Gabrielle Côté	Oussama Fares	6-1	William cloutier	January 11, 2026	March 29, 2026
