= Laurence Bareil =

Canadian journalist

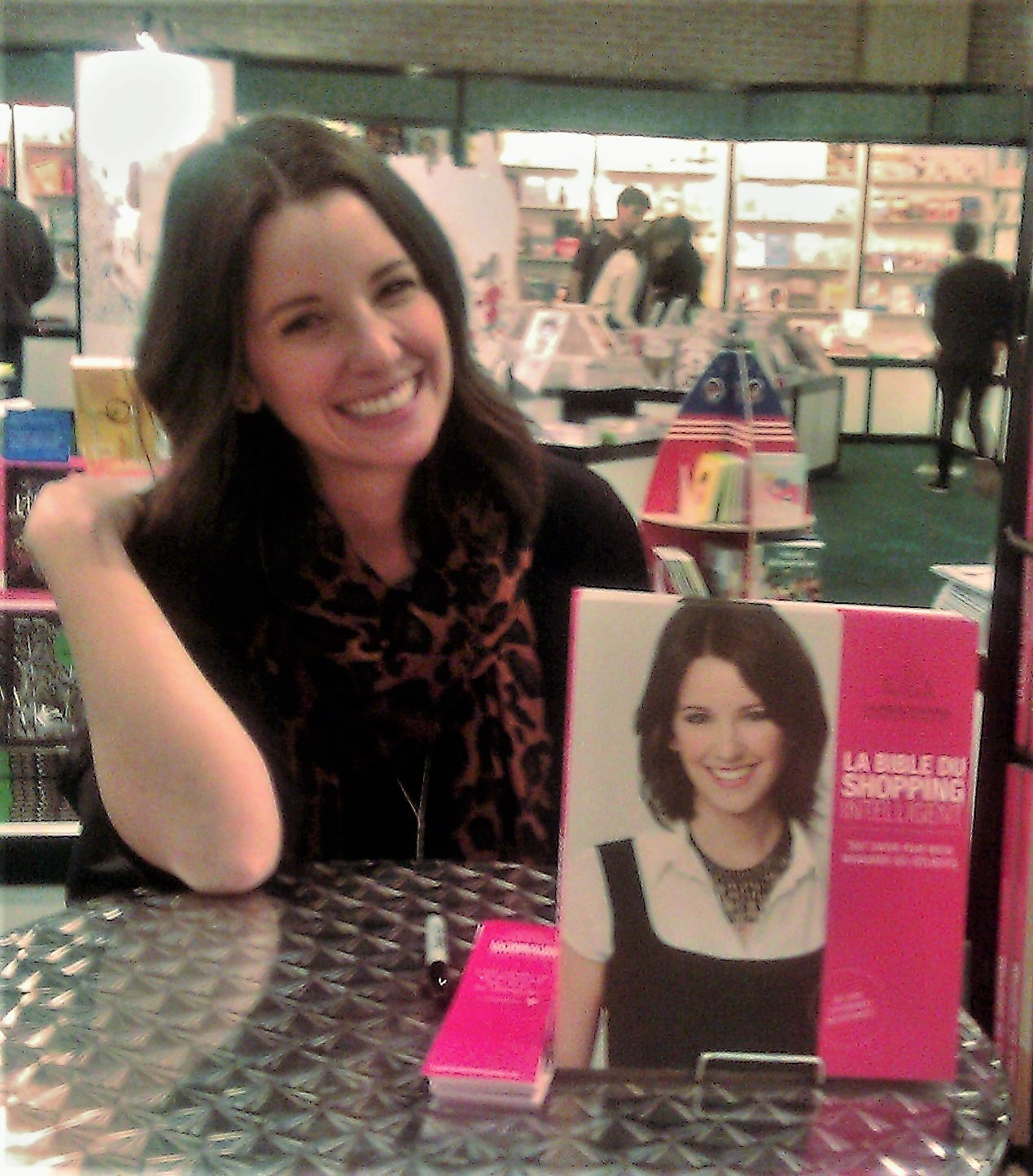
- Laurence Bareil photographed in Montreal, at the Salon du livre de Montréal 2016.
- Born: Trois-Rivières, Quebec
- Occupation: Television personality

Laurence Bareil is a Québécois journalist and television host.

Born in Trois-Rivières, Quebec, she began her career in the media at the age of 17 as a trainee for the local TVA owned-and-operated station, CHEM-DT. In 2002, she began studying communication at the Université du Québec à Montréal while attending courses at Promédia School, a structure offering training in spoken journalism.

At the end of her training, she was hired by the channel Canal Vie to host a program called Tous les chemins. Working at first at RDS, she joined the TVA, where she became a reporter and weather presenter. She also co-hosted the cooking show Qu'est-ce qui mijote (What's Cooking). Since 2013, she has hosted a series called La Reine du Shopping (The Queen of Shopping) on Canal Vie. As of 2010, she was also a reporter for La série Montréal-Québec, a reality show based on hockey rivalries between the two cities.

In 2021 she was a competitor in the Quebec edition of Big Brother Célébrités.
