= Richardson Zéphir =

Canadian actor and comedian (born 1977)

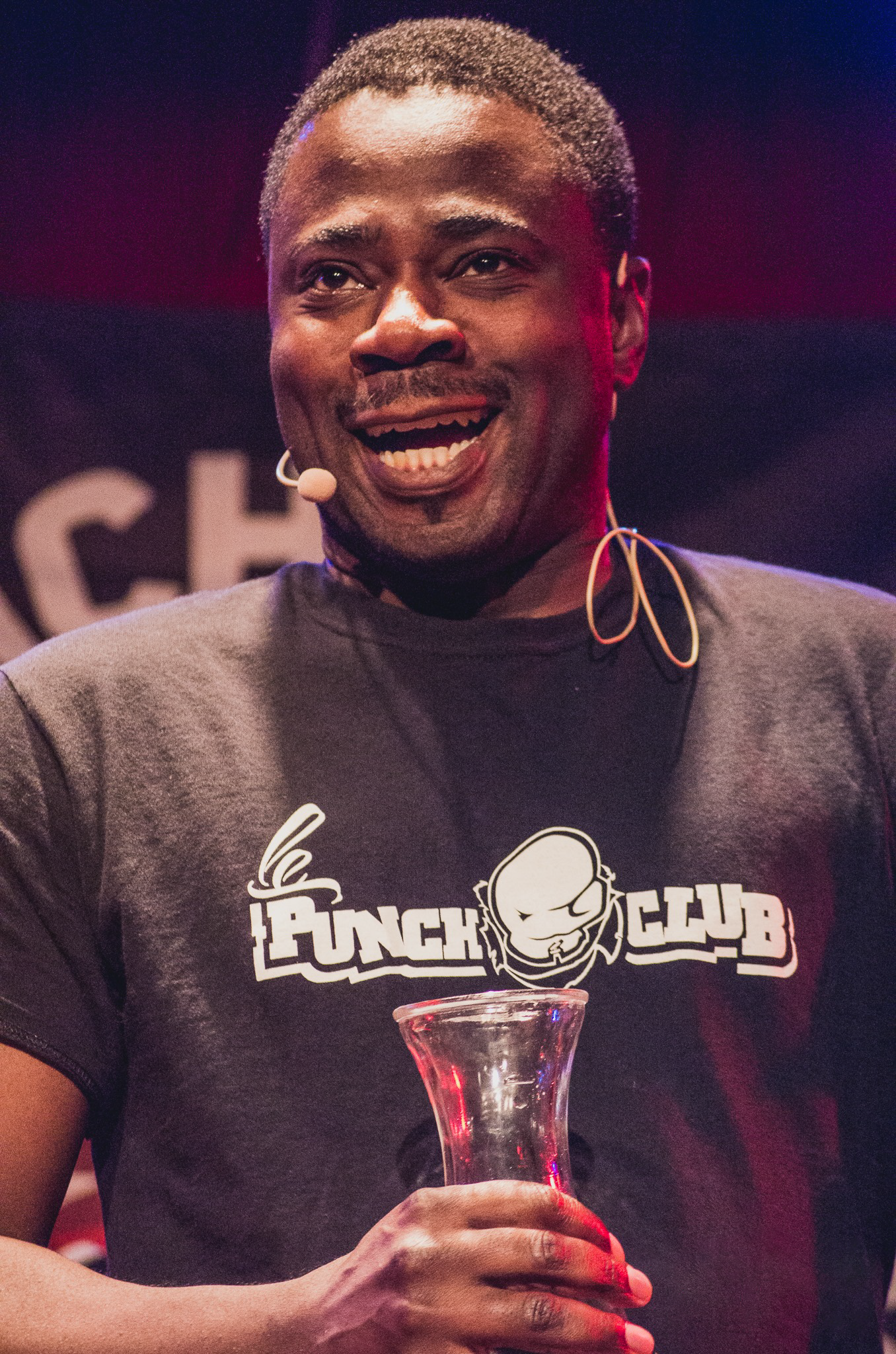
- Richardson Zéphir during a Punch Club in 2017.
- Born: December 29, 1977 (age 48); Laval, Quebec, Canada

Comedy career
- Years active: 2009–present
- Medium: Stand-up; film; television; music
- Genres: Observational comedy; musical comedy; blue comedy; black comedy; insult comedy; sketch comedy; satire
- Subjects: Haitian culture; Canadian culture; Quebec culture; marriage; everyday life; pop culture
- Website: richardsonzephir.com

Richardson Zéphir (born December 29, 1977) is a Canadian stand-up comedian and actor based in Montreal, Quebec. He is known for his participation in the television shows Big Brother Célébrités and LOL : qui rira le dernier ?.

== Biography ==
Born in Laval to immigrant parents from Haiti, Richardson Zéphir was educated at Odyssée-des-Jeunes and Horizon Jeunesse, where he discovered improvisation in childhood. He then continued his post-secondary studies in petrochemistry at the Collège de Maisonneuve in Montreal, specializing in water purification, hydrocarbons, natural gases and chemical processes, while continuing to practice improvisation.

With Ian Métayer, Zéphir collaborates in the creation and production of comedy shows under the banner Les Grands Burlesques.

In 2004, he became co-owner of Terrasses Bonsecours. In 2009, he received a call from the director of French-language programming at the Zoofest festival, who offered him the chance to participate in the first edition of the festival in July of the same year with his group Les Grands Burlesques. Deciding to devote himself fully to comedy, he sold his shares in Terrasses Bonsecours.

Subsequently, Zéphir regularly participated in comedy evenings and also hosted some of them in bars in Quebec. It was in 2016 that he was first noticed by winning the seventh edition of the comedy competition En route vers mon premier gala Juste pour rire.

Over the next few years, Zéphir made numerous television appearances, starring in several series, including Les Simone, Trauma, Faits divers and La Maison-Bleue. He participated several times in the end-of-year revue Bye Bye.

In 2021, he was in the first season of the Quebec adaptation of Big Brother Célébrités. He finished in fifth place, and won the audience award.

More recently, in 2023, he participated in the first season of the Quebec adaptation of LOL : qui rira le dernier ? and won first place ex aequo with comedian Laurent Paquin.

On May 10, 2023, he launched his first one-man-show entitled Zéphir.

=== Personal life ===
His girlfriend, Farah Paul, is also a comedian.

== Filmography ==
=== Television ===
- 2007: Les 4 coins
- 2009: Gala Juste pour rire
- 2011: Grand Rire Comédie Club
- 2014: Trauma
- 2014: Les gars des vues
- 2014: En route vers mon premier Gala Juste pour rire
- 2014: LOL :-)
- 2015: Une histoire vraie
- 2016: En route vers mon premier Gala Juste pour rire
- 2016: Just for Laughs Gags
- 2016: Les Simone
- 2016: Les aventures du Pharmachien
- 2017: Tourlou 2017
- 2018: Faits Divers
- 2018: Bye Bye 2018
- 2020: Bye Bye 2020
- 2020: Happily Married (C'est comme ça que je t'aime)
- 2020–2022: La Maison-Bleue
- 2021: Le bal Mammouth
- 2021: Caméra Café
- 2021: Punch Club
- 2021: Club Soly
- 2021: Gala de l'industrie des 36e Prix Gémeaux
- 2021: Big Brother Célébrités
- 2021: LOL : Qui rira le dernier?
- 2023: La Petite Vie (1 épisode)
- 2024: Lakay Nou : Fr. Moïse
- 2024: Le maître du jeu (Contestant, season 3)
- 2025: STAT: Floppy the Clown
- 2025: Agence Brainsto

=== Film ===
- 2018: My Intelligent Comedy (Les scènes fortuites) from Guillaume Lambert : fishmonger

=== Music videos ===
- 2011: Titanium by David Guetta: Soldier
