= Elisabetta Fantone =

Canadian actress

- Born: Montreal, Quebec, Canada
- Occupations: Actress, painter, model
- Years active: 2006–present
- Website: www.elisabetta.ca

Elisabetta Fantone is a Canadian actress.

== Early life ==
Fantone was born in Montreal, Quebec. Shortly after her birth, her family moved to Italy, her parents' homeland, where she spent the first eight years of her life before returning to Montreal.

== Career ==
=== Recording artist ===
In January 2007, Fantone released her first single Feel a remix of the song by Robbie Williams. The song was partly translated in Italian and has a house-trance style. The song featured on Tycoon Records' MC Mario's Mixdown 2007 distributed by Sony.

Feel hit number 2 on the Club Mix on Mix 96 (now Virgin Radio). The song was played on the Quebec television show Minuit, le soir.

=== Author ===
The book Journal Intime d'une lofteuse, based on Fantone's reality television appearances on "Loft Story 2," was released by Les Publications Charron & Cie in May 2008.

=== Film ===
Year	Title	Role	Notes
2025	Gunslingers	Annie	Uncredited
2023	The Lurking Fear	Crystal Montgomery	
2023	MobKing	Mia White	
2020	Sorority Secrets	Debra Thompson	Television film
2018	Christmas Eve	Evelyn	Short film
2018	Papa Est Devenu un Lutin	Karine Rousseau	
2017	Girlfriend Killer	Marissa Stefans	Television film
2017	The River Cabin	Sarah	Short film
2016	The MobKing	Mia White	Television film
2015	Coffee Date	Lisa	Short film
2014	Big Eyes	Olivetti Girl	
2013	Miami Beach	Cassandra	Short film
2013	Nicky Deuce	Lorraine	Television film
2012	Wolverine Hotel: Screen Test	Mandy Wheaton	Short film

=== Television ===
Year	Title	Role	Notes
2025	Law & Order: Special Victims Unit	Lindsey Kruger	1 episode
2025–	Paper Empire	Gabriela Russo	6 episodes
2022	La Petite Mairesse	Lisa Pigeon	7 episodes
2020	Fatal Vows	Joanne Ringer	1 episode
2018	XOXO	Conseillère (Advisor)	Television series
2015	Patrice Lemieux 24/7	Camille	1 episode
2015	South Beach	Rebecca	6 episodes
2014	Ces gars-là	Maripier Dancer	1 episode
2013	The Arrangement	Tamra Norton	Television film
2012–2013	The Glades	Laura Jordan / Lisa	4 episodes
2010	Secrets of the Mountain	Carolyn Thacker	Television film

=== Music videos ===
Year	Title	Role	Notes
2020	Lost (Club Remix)	Woman	
2015	Lost	Woman	
2014	Luis Fonsi, Juan Luis Guerra: Llegaste tú	Wife	
