= Mona de Grenoble =

Canadian comedian and drag queen

Alexandre Aussant, known by the stage name Mona de Grenoble, is a Canadian drag queen from Montreal, Quebec. She was the winner of the third season of Big Brother Célébrités.

Originally from Saint-Jean-sur-Richelieu, Aussant performs in a camp drag style, with her performances based on stand-up comedy rather than dancing or lip-syncing.

In 2019, she launched Provocante, a bi-weekly stand-up comedy night, at Cabaret Mado. In 2022, she premiered Mes Premières Chaleurs, her first full-length solo comedy show, at Montreal's Zoofest for emerging comedians.

On September 18, 2022, Mona de Grenoble, Barbada de Barbades and Rita Baga presented an award at the Prix Gémeaux ceremony, and introduced Gisèle Lullaby, the third season winner of Canada's Drag Race, to announce the winner. Mona was also a contributor to Marie-Lyne Joncas's Noovo talk show Le Fabuleux Printemps de Marie-Lyne.

In 2023, Mona appeared as a contestant in season 2 of Le maître du jeu, the Quebec adaptation of UK panel show Taskmaster and won the season.

In March 2024, Mona won the Discovery of the Year Award at the Gala Les Olivier.

In November 2024, Mona launched a solo comedy tour titled De la poudre aux yeux in the province of Quebec, which is scheduled to run for two years. As of November 22, the show had sold over 25,000 tickets. Canadian Newspaper, La Presse, reviewed the show and described the ending of the show as "one of the best five minutes of comedy in 2024."

Mona also hosted the pre-broadcast artisans gala for the 26th Quebec Cinema Awards in December of 2024.

In 2025 she was announced as having a supporting role in the television series adaptation of Bon Cop, Bad Cop.
