= Stephanie Harvey =

Canadian professional esports player and developer

missharvey
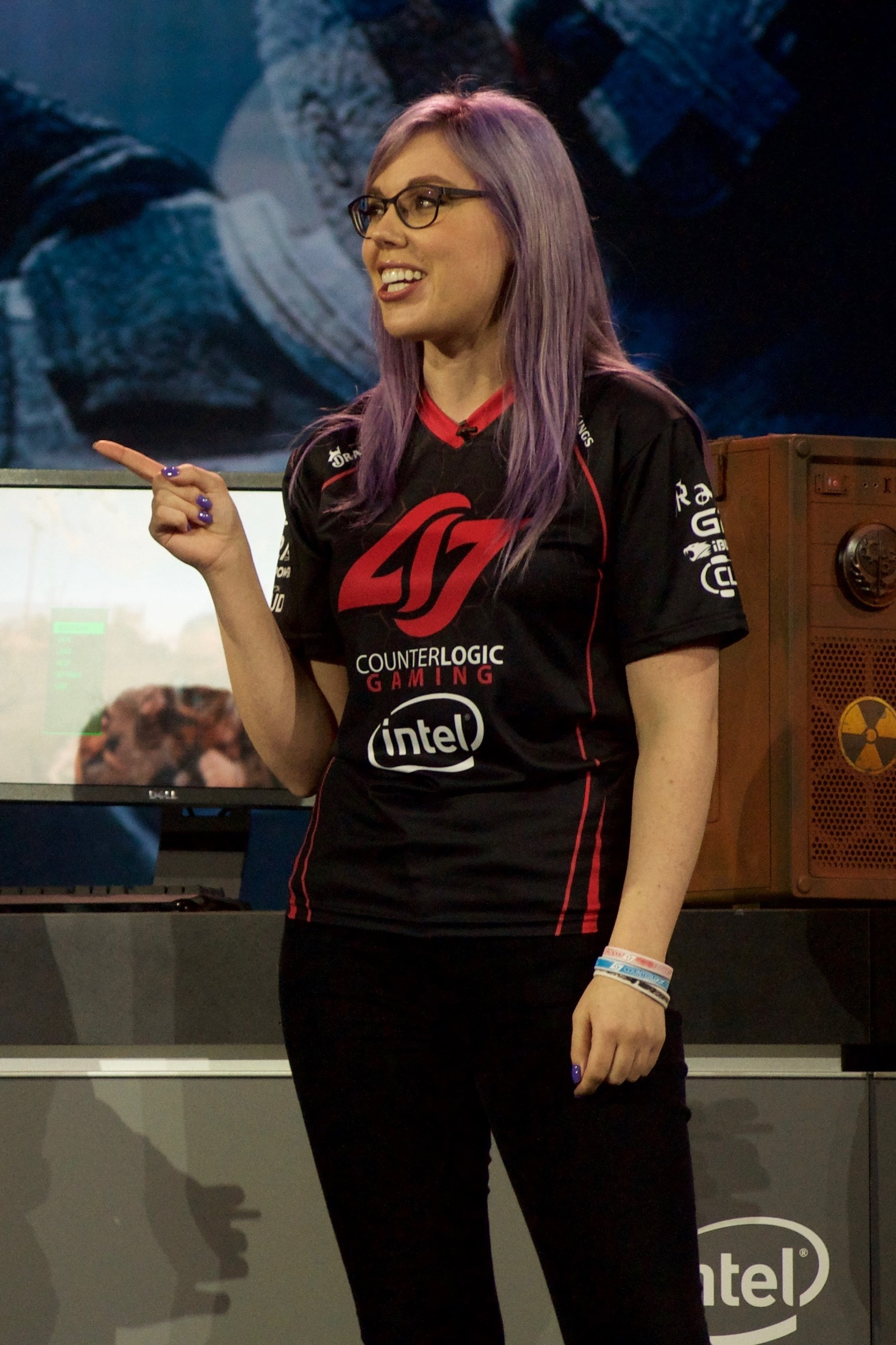
- Harvey at the 2016 Intel Keynote

Personal information
- Name: Stephanie Harvey
- Born: 19 April 1986 (age 40)
- Nationality: Canadian

Career information
- Games: Counter-Strike; Counter-Strike: Global Offensive
- Playing career: 2003–2019

Team history
- 2005: CheckSix Divas
- 2006–2010: SK Ladies
- 2011–2015: UBINITED
- 2015–2019: CLG Red

Stephanie Harvey (born 19 April 1986), also known by her in-game name missharvey, is a Canadian video game developer and retired professional gamer. She is best known as a Counter-Strike and Counter-Strike: Global Offensive (CS:GO) player, having won five female world championships. She formerly played for Counter Logic Gaming Red.

Outside professional gaming, Harvey works as a designer at video game developer Ubisoft Montreal. She is also known for advocating against gender discrimination in professional gaming, co-founding the online community Missclicks to address the under-representation of women in geek and video game culture.

In November 2016, she was listed as one of BBC's 100 Women. In December 2016, she won the third season of Canada's Smartest Person. In January 2022, Harvey won the second season of Big Brother Célébrités.

Harvey currently works for Counter-Logic Gaming as the Director of Business Development.

In 2021, Harvey received The Esports Awards' Lifetime Achievement Award.

== Professional gaming career ==
Harvey began her professional gaming career playing Counter-Strike 1.5 in 2003; a year later, she created the team Canadian Divas. In 2005, she joined CheckSix Divas, with whom she placed fifth in the Electronic Sports World Cup (ESCW). She then moved to SK Ladies, playing with the team for four years and winning two world championships.

In 2011 Harvey founded a new Counter-Strike team, UBINITED, sponsored by her employer Ubisoft, which went on to win the ESCW 2011 Women's event. The following year the team switched to CS:GO and again won that year's ESCW Women's event. In 2015 it signed to Counter Logic Gaming to become CLG.CS Red, and won a third ESCW Women's tournament. In 2016 CLG.CS became the first all-female team to move into a gaming house and began to compete in more men's events.

Harvey left CLG.CS Red in May 2017 but rejoined the team a year later. Harvey left CLG Red in March 2019.

== Advocacy ==
Harvey has spoken out against sexism and gender discrimination in professional gaming. She has highlighted that less than 5% of professional gamers are women, that there is a significant gender disparity in player's earnings, and that women in gaming face routine verbal abuse and sexual harassment:

When I started gaming I was really a pioneer, which I didn’t know at the time, and it was not easy... Over the Internet, people don’t have to deal with the repercussions of insulting someone else. They can’t see a sad face. I had to build a really strong shell to be able to succeed.

— Harvey, interview with The Surge, 2015

It's still a 'boy's club' so as a woman you're automatically judged for being different... The way I get harassed is about what they would do to my body, about why I don't deserve to be there because I use my sexuality - it's all extremely graphic... Why do I do this if my community hate me? Because I am a feminist, because I believe women have a place in gaming.

— Harvey, interview with the BBC, 2016

In 2013, together with female professional gamers Anna Prosser Robinson, Geneviève Forget and Stephanie Powell, Harvey founded Missclicks, an online community and safe space to address these issues by promoting female role models in gaming.

After winning Season Three of Canada's Smartest Person in December 2016, Harvey selected Opération Enfant Soleil, a Quebec charity supporting pediatrics in the province, as the recipient of the $20,000 in prize money.

Harvey is a PAIDIA guide, focused on promoting inclusive gaming communities for women and allies of all genders.

== Creative Projects ==
In 2019, Harvey partnered with Michele Morrow to produce the Game Diaries Podcast. The first season has 8 full-length episodes and 3 post-script episodes.

In 2020, Harvey launched a digital citizenship brand Élevey, focused on promoting awareness about cyberaddiction, cybersecurity and cybercitizenship.
