= Big Brother (Quebec TV series) =

- Presented by: Chéli Sauvé-Castonguay
- No. of days: 63
- No. of contestants: 15
- Winner: Vincent "Vinny" Durand Dubé
- Runner-up: Christian Bilodeau
- No. of episodes: 64

Release
- Original network: V
- Original release: 14 March – 16 May 2010

Big Brother is a Canadian reality television series that aired on V in Quebec from 14 March to 16 May 2010. It was the first Quebec edition of the international Big Brother format and was hosted by Chéli Sauvé-Castonguay. Fifteen housemates entered the house on the first day and the season ran for 63 days. Vincent "Vinny" Durand Dubé won the C$100,000 prize. It replaced Loft Story, V's earlier adaptation of the format, and was followed a decade later by the celebrity edition Big Brother Célébrités on Noovo.

The host was TV presenter Chéli Sauvé-Castonguay and lasted 63 days. The season launched on March 14, 2010, with fifteen housemates entering the house on Day 1. This series was the first international version to follow the American format in which the game is played internally, but with slight variations.

Aside from the main show, there was an accompanying show that aired every Sunday on V. The show was hosted by journalist Pascale Levesque. The winner of Loft Story: La Revanche, Sébastien Tremblay, blogged daily about the show on its official website.

No further Quebec editions were made for a decade. In 2020, Bell Media announced a celebrity edition, Big Brother Célébrités, produced by Entourage Télévision and hosted by Marie-Mai. It premiered on Noovo on 10 January 2021 with 15 Quebec personalities in the house. Noovo renewed it for a second season, to air in January 2022.

== Format ==
Big Brother Quebec loosely followed the format of the American version in that the housemates mostly decided who would stay and who would go. However, there were slight differences:

=== Numéro 1 ===
The Numéro 1 (English: Number 1) was similar to the Head of Household position in the American version. Numéro 1 was exempt from eviction and enjoyed certain luxuries. They were also required to nominate two housemates for eviction.

=== Numéro 2 ===
The Numéro 2 (English: Number 2) was a unique feature to Big Brother Quebec. Numéro 2 was selected by Numéro 1. Despite being immune from eviction and enjoying certain luxuries, they were forced to sleep at the foot of Numéro 1's bed, lest they lose their power and privilege. In addition, Numéro 2 was required to choose a third housemate to nominate for eviction.

=== Pouvoir de Véto ===
The Pouvoir de Véto (English: Power of Veto) worked similarly to the Power of Veto in the US, in that the winner could use it to save a nominee; however, unlike the American version, the Veto winner decided the replacement nominee. On occasion, there would be two Vetoes available to win instead of the usual one, this would generally be weeks that the public voted to evict.

=== Food competitions ===
Food competitions were similar to the current Have and Have Not competitions in the US. The winners received desired food items, such as steak, bread, vegetables, and dairy, while the losers dined on slop.

=== Evictions ===
Unlike most seasons of the American edition, three housemates faced eviction each week. On eviction nights, the three nominees were moved to a special room to hear the results of the vote, instead of sitting on designated chairs in the living room. Finally, all housemates except Numéro 1 voted to evict, unlike the US, where the two nominees cannot vote, and the Head of Household votes only in a tiebreaker situation. There were exceptions to this, however; the public on occasion had the opportunity to evict a housemate.

=== Grenade ===
Used in other international formats like the Australian version, the "grenade" was used by the newly evicted housemate to throw at any housemate of their choice. The grenade had different powers and these powers changed every week.

=== Finale ===
The finale was completely different from the American version. Six housemates were in the house on the final day, unlike 2 or 3 in the American version. Unlike the jury format used in the American version to decide the winner, like the original format, the viewing public decided on the winner. However the former and current housemate get to vote on which finalist should not win.

In the finale, about six housemates remained and the viewing public decided the winner with a mid-season vote also handed to the public. According to the winner, housemates received compensation of C$300 per week.

== Housemates ==
Housemate	Age	Residence	Occupation	Entered	Exited	Status
Vincent "Vinny" Durand Dubé	28	Mont-Tremblant	Event Organiser	Day 1	Day 63	Winner
Christian Bilodeau	33	Saint-Odilon-de-Cranbourne	Farmer	Day 1	Day 63	Runner-up
Vickie Dagenais	26	Saint-Chrysostome	Lawyer	Day 1	Day 63	3rd Place
Jean Marcotte	56	Gatineau	Retired military	Day 1	Day 63	4th Place
Éric Cormier	29	Sherbrooke	Kinesiologist	Day 1	Day 63	5th Place
Josée Bouthillier	49	Saint-Colomban	Housewife	Day 1	Day 63	9th Evicted
Stéphanie	21	Saguenay	Student	Day 1	Day 56	8th Evicted
Jonathan Martineau	33	Sherbrooke	Graphic designer	Day 1	Day 51	7th Evicted
Vincent Carignan	32	Québec City	Biologist	Day 1	Day 49	6th Evicted
Stéphanie "Lyvia" Monroe	31	Mirabel	Hairdresser, Porn Actress	Day 1	Day 42	5th Evicted
Marie Elaine Pitre	22	Rosemère	Marketing Co-ordinator	Day 1	Day 35	4th Evicted
Fey Cody	27	Saint-Hyacinthe	Lighting technician	Day 1	Day 28	3rd Evicted
Andy	44	Québec City	Retired military	Day 1	Day 14	2nd Evicted
Sandra Lee	37	Montreal	Actress	Day 1	Day 7	1st Evicted
Amélie Lussier	24	Laval	Nursing Assistant	Day 1	Day 7	Walked

== Slop ==
Week 1	Week 2	Week 3	Week 4	Week 5	Week 6	Week 7	Week 8	Week 9
none	Christian; Éric; Jonathan; Marie-Élaine; Stéphanie; Vinny	none	Josée; Vickie; Vincent	none	Christian; Éric; Jean; Jonathan; Josée; Vincent; Vinny	none		

== Voting History ==
	Week 1	Week 2	Week 3	Week 4	Week 5	Week 6	Week 7	Week 8		Week 9		
	Week 1	Week 2	Week 3	Week 4	Week 5	Week 6	Week 7	Day 51	Day 56	Final Eviction	Final Vote	
Numéro 1	Christian	Fey	Christian	Lyvia	Vincent	Vickie	Christian	Vinny	Éric	Christian	(none)	
Numéro 2	Fey	Marie-Élaine	Jean	Jonathan	Vickie	Vincent	Vinny	Jean	Josée	(none)	(none)	
Nominations (pre-veto)	Amélie; Andy; Sandra	Éric; Josée; Jonathan	Lyvia; Stéphanie; Vincent	Christian; Fey; Jean	Éric; Jean; Vinny	Jonathan; Josée; Lyvia	Éric; Josée; Vickie	Jonathan; Stéphanie; Vickie	Christian; Jean; Vinny	(none)	(none)	
Veto Winner	Sandra	Éric	Vincent	Lyvia; Vincent	Éric; Jonathan	Stéphanie	Éric; Vickie	Éric	Christian; Jean	(none)	(none)	
Nominations (post-veto)	Andy; Josée; Sandra	Andy; Josée; Jonathan	Fey; Lyvia; Stéphanie	Christian; Fey; Jean	Christian; Marie-Élaine; Vinny	Éric; Josée; Lyvia	Jean; Josée; Vincent	Jonathan; Stéphanie; Vickie	Stéphanie; Vickie; Vinny	(none)	(none)	
Vinny	Sandra	Andy	Lyvia	Jean	No; Voting	Josée	No; Voting	Numéro 1	No; Voting	Jean	Winner (Day 63)	
Christian	Numéro 1	Josée	Numéro 1	Fey	No; Voting	Josée	Numéro 1	Stéphanie	No; Voting	Jean	Runner-Up (Day 63)	
Vickie	Sandra	Andy	Fey	Fey	No; Voting	Lyvia	No; Voting	Jonathan	No; Voting	Jean	Third Place (Day 63)	
Jean	Andy	Jonathan	Lyvia	Christian	No; Voting	Josée	No; Voting	Stéphanie	No; Voting	Josée	Fourth Place (Day 63)	
Éric	Josée	Andy	Fey	Jean	No; Voting	Lyvia	No; Voting	Jonathan	Numéro 1	Jean	Fifth Place (Day 63)	
Josée	Sandra	Andy	Fey	Fey	No; Voting	Lyvia	No; Voting	Jonathan	No; Voting	Jean	Evicted (Day 63)	
Stéphanie	Sandra	Andy	Fey	Fey	No; Voting	Lyvia	No; Voting	Jonathan	No; Voting	Vinny	Evicted (Day 56)	
Jonathan	Sandra	Andy	Fey	Fey	No; Voting	Lyvia	No; Voting	Stéphanie	Evicted (Day 51)	Vinny	Evicted (Day 51)	
Vincent	Andy	Andy	Fey	Christian	Numéro 1	Éric	No; Voting	Evicted (Day 49)		Josée	Evicted (Day 49)	
Lyvia	Sandra	Jonathan	Fey	Numéro 1	No; Voting	Josée	Evicted (Day 42)			Josée	Evicted (Day 42)	
Marie-Élaine	Sandra	Jonathan	Lyvia	Jean	No; Voting	Evicted (Day 35)				Josée	Evicted (Day 35)	
Fey	Sandra	Numéro 1	Lyvia	Jean	Evicted (Day 28)					Josée	Evicted (Day 28)	
Andy	Sandra	Jonathan	Evicted (Day 14)							Josée	Evicted (Day 14)	
Sandra	Josée	Evicted (Day 7)								Josée	Evicted (Day 7)	
Amélie	Sandra	Walked (Day 7)								Vinny	Walked (Day 7)	
Notes	None	1	2	3	4	5,6	7	8,9		10		
Walked	Amélie	none										
Evicted	Sandra; 10 of 14 votes to evict	Andy; 7 of 12 votes to evict	Eviction cancelled	Fey; 5 of 11 votes to evict	Marie-Élaine; Public's votes to evict	Lyvia; Tied vote (4-4-1); Vickie's choice to evict	Vincent; Public's votes to evict	Jonathan; 4 of 7 votes to evict	Stéphanie; Public's votes to evict	Josée; 7 of 15 votes to evict	Éric; Fewest votes (out of 5)	Jean; Fewest votes (out of 4)
Evicted	Sandra; 10 of 14 votes to evict	Andy; 7 of 12 votes to evict	Eviction cancelled	Fey; 5 of 11 votes to evict	Marie-Élaine; Public's votes to evict	Lyvia; Tied vote (4-4-1); Vickie's choice to evict	Vincent; Public's votes to evict	Jonathan; 4 of 7 votes to evict	Stéphanie; Public's votes to evict	Josée; 7 of 15 votes to evict	Vickie; Fewest votes (out of 3)	Christian; 49.5% (out of 2)
Evicted	Sandra; 10 of 14 votes to evict	Andy; 7 of 12 votes to evict	Eviction cancelled	Fey; 5 of 11 votes to evict	Marie-Élaine; Public's votes to evict	Lyvia; Tied vote (4-4-1); Vickie's choice to evict	Vincent; Public's votes to evict	Jonathan; 4 of 7 votes to evict	Stéphanie; Public's votes to evict	Josée; 7 of 15 votes to evict	Vinny; 50.5% to win	

=== Notes ===
This housemate is the Numéro 1.
This housemate is the Numéro 2.

- ^Note 1:Following her eviction, Sandra used the power of the Grenade to nominate Josée. Because of this, Numéro 1 Fey only nominated one housemate for eviction.
- ^Note 2:Fey, with 7 of 11 votes, was supposed to be evicted. However, the housemates previously took part in a sleep deprivation task, with success resulting in the eviction being cancelled. They passed the task, and no one was evicted this week.
- ^Note 3:During Week 4, there were two vetoes won. The first one was won by Vincent and the second by Lyvia.
- ^Note 4:Following a vote to decide the use of the Grenade, it was decided that the public would vote to evict instead of the housemates. Therefore, the housemates did not vote in Week 5.
- ^Note 5: The power of the Grenade in week five was that the evicted housemate could grant immunity to 5 people of their choice. As Marie-Élaine was this housemate, she gave immunity to Christian, Jean, Vickie, Vincent and Vinny.
- ^Note 6:Vickie, as Numéro 1, had to vote to break a 4-4-1 tied vote between Lyvia and Josée on Day 42.
- ^Note 7:Following a vote to decide the use of the Grenade, it was decided that the public would vote to evict instead of the housemates for the remaining weeks.
- ^Note 8:Following week seven's eviction, Big Brother announced a double eviction for the following week. One housemate would be evicted by their fellow housemates, while another would be voted out by a public vote.
- ^Note 9:Following his eviction, Jonathan used the power of the Grenade to nominate Christian.
- ^Note 10:Following Week 8's eviction, the public voting opened to vote for a winner. Big Brother announced that all 15 housemates would vote for the person in the final 6 who would be the least deserving to win the game. The finalist with the most votes would be the final evictee, regardless of the results of the final vote. During the week, the housemates competed in a series of challenges to name the final Numéro 1, who would have immunity from the vote.
