= Loft Story (Canadian TV series) =

- Logo of the 4th season
- Genre: Reality television
- Based on: Big Brother by John de Mol Jr.
- Presented by: Renée-Claude Brazeau (2003); Isabelle Maréchal (2006); Marie Plourde (2006–2008); Pierre-Yves Lord (2009)
- Country of origin: Canada
- Original language: French
- No. of seasons: 6

Production
- Production location: Quebec
- Running time: 30 (Daily show); 90 (Talk show)
- Production company: Endemol

Original release
- Network: TQS
- Release: 5 October 2003 – 31 May 2009

Related
- Big Brother; Secret Story

Loft Story is a Quebec television series broadcast on the TQS television network, and was an adaptation of the show Loft Story in France, which itself was an adaptation of the Big Brother franchise. TQS became V and replaced Loft Story with a new Big Brother series for Quebec in 2010.

During the first season (2003), the show had TVA's Occupation Double as its main competitor, and was a success in terms of viewership, but was not as financially successful as the French version. Therefore, the program was discontinued the following season but was resurrected three years later in January 2006. In response to criticism of year 1, year 2 toned down the sexual content and replaced it with daily games and truth/dare events. The loft was also changed to include a "stunt room" the size of a basketball court, which serves for games and entertainment. A third season started in September 2006, a fourth on September 26, 2007, a fifth in Fall 2008, and an All-Star season subtitled La Revanche in Spring 2009.

== Season 1 ==
Season 1 aired from October 5, 2003 to December 7, 2003 for a total of 64 days.

=== Contestants ===
| Celebrity | Home | Occupation | Age |
|---|---|---|---|
| Brigitte Bourdeau | Ottawa | Theatre | 25 |
| David Tousignant | Montreal | Journalist | 28 |
| Hugues Dubé | Chicoutimi | Operator | 23 |
| Julie Lemay | Carignan | Teacher | 23 |
| Léa Raby-Gauthier | Montreal | Designer | 20 |
| Marie-Laurence Drouin | Saint-Jean-sur-Richelieu | Theatre | 20 |
| Mathieu Gaudet | Gatineau | Musician & singer | 23 |
| Mélanie Leclaire | Outremont | Data processing | 27 |
| Nadia Bonnette | Saint-Mathias-sur-Richelieu | Hairdresser | 21 |
| Nicolas Daigle | Montreal | Student | 30 |
| Samuel Tissot | Laval | Biology Student | 22 |
| Sébastien Chalifoux | Montreal | Fireman | 23 |
| Steve Quévillon | Saint-Cuthbert | Fitter of racks | 24 |
| Yanick Dufour | LaSalle | Policeman | 31 |

=== Nominations table ===
Each week one sex was Immune, alternating each week. In the first week only the men were eligible for Nomination, and the next week only the women were eligible for Nomination. This continued to alternate. In the finale two winners were crowned – one male, and one female.

| | Week 1 | Week 2 | Week 3 | Week 4 | | Week 5 | Week 6 | Week 7 | Week 8 | Week 9 Final | |
| | Week 1 | Week 2 | Week 3 | Replace | Nomination | Week 5 | Week 6 | Week 7 | Week 8 | Week 9 Final | |
|---|---|---|---|---|---|---|---|---|---|---|---|
| Julie | Steve; David | Not eligible | David; Samuel | Sébastien | Nominated | —N/a | Not eligible | —N/a | Nominated | Female Winner (Day 64) | |
| Samuel | Not eligible | Julie; Nadia | Nominated | Not eligible | Julie; Léa | Not eligible | —N/a | Nominated | No nominations | Male Winner (Day 64) | |
| Brigitte | Hugues; Steve | Not eligible | David; Yanick | Nicolas | Not eligible | —N/a | Nominated | —N/a | Nominated | Female Runner-Up (Day 64) | |
| Hugues | Nominated | Julie; Nadia | Not eligible | Not eligible | Julie; Léa | Nominated | —N/a | Not eligible | No nominations | Male Runner-Up (Day 64) | |
| Mélanie | Hugues; Steve | Not eligible | David; Samuel | Sébastien | Not eligible | —N/a | Not eligible | —N/a | Nominated | Evicted (Day 57) | |
| Mathieu | Not eligible | Marie-Laurence; Nadia | Not eligible | Not eligible | Julie; Marie-Laurence | Not eligible | —N/a | Nominated | Evicted (Day 50) | | |
| Marie-Laurence | Mathieu; Hughes | Nominated | David; Yanick | Sébastien | Not eligible | —N/a | Nominated | Evicted (Day 43) | | | |
| Nicolas | Not in House | | | Nominated | Exempt | Nominated | Evicted (Day 36) | | | | |
| Léa | Hugues; Steve | Not eligible | Not eligible | Sébastien | Nominated | Evicted (Day 29) | | | | | |
| Sébastien | Not in House | | | Nominated | Evicted (Day 25) | | | | | | |
| David | Not eligible | Julie; Marie-Laurence | Not eligible | Walked (Day 17) | | | | | | | |
| Yanick | Not eligible | Marie-Laurence; Nadia | Nominated | Walked (Day 17) | | | | | | | |
| Nadia | Hugues; Steve | Nominated | Evicted (Day 15) | | | | | | | | |
| Steve | Nominated | Evicted (Day 8) | | | | | | | | | |
| Notes | none | | | ^{1} | none | | | | | | |
| Nominated | Hugues, Steve | Marie, Nadia | Samuel, Yanick | Nicolas, Sébastien | Julie, Léa | Hugues, Nicolas | Brigitte, Marie | Mathieu, Samuel | Brigitte, Julie, Mélanie | Hugues, Samuel | Brigitte, Julie |
| Walked | none | | David; Yanick | none | | | | | | | |
| Evicted | Steve; Most votes to evict | Nadia; Most votes to evict | Eviction; Cancelled | Sébastien; 4 of 5 votes to evict | Léa; Most votes to evict | Nicolas; Most votes to evict | Marie; Most votes to evict | Mathieu; Most votes to evict | Mélanie; Most votes to evict | Hugues; 48% to win | Brigitte; 45% to win |
| Evicted | Steve; Most votes to evict | Nadia; Most votes to evict | Eviction; Cancelled | Sébastien; 4 of 5 votes to evict | Léa; Most votes to evict | Nicolas; Most votes to evict | Marie; Most votes to evict | Mathieu; Most votes to evict | Mélanie; Most votes to evict | Samuel; 52% to win | Julie; 55% to win |

^1 Nicolas and Sébastien entered the House to replace David & Yanick who voluntarily left the House the week before. The girls had to choose one of them to evict, and they chose Sébastien.

The winners of the first season were Julie Lemay and Samuel Tissot and the finalists were Brigitte Bourdeau and Hugues Dubé. Lemay subsequently published two books: "Un automne au Loft: Le journal de la gagnante de Loft Story" and "L'envers de la téléréalité".

== Season 2 ==
- Start date: January 29, 2006
- End date: April 2, 2006
- Duration: 64 days

Season 2 was hosted by Isabelle Maréchal and Virginie Coossa, and was produced by Groupe Tele-Vision, under licence from Endemol.

=== Nominations table ===
In alternate weeks the men will nominate the women, and the women will nominate the men, until there are two of each gender left – there will then be a winner of each gender.

| | Week 1 | Week 2 | Week 3 | Week 4 | | Week 5 | Week 6 | | Week 7 | Week 8 | Week 9 Final | |
| | Week 1 | Week 2 | Week 3 | Female | Male | Week 5 | Week 6 | | Week 7 | Week 8 | Week 9 Final | |
|---|---|---|---|---|---|---|---|---|---|---|---|---|
| Stéphanie | Benoît, Maxime | Not eligible | Étienne, Steve | Not eligible | Exempt | Not eligible | Stay | Étienne | Not eligible | Maxime, Mathieu | Female Winner (Day 64) | |
| Mathieu | Exempt | Nancy, Stéphanie | Not eligible | Elisabetta, Stéphanie | Nominated | Elisabetta, Lysandre | Stay | Not eligible | Elisabetta, Stéphanie | Not eligible | Male Winner (Day 64) | |
| Dominique | Maxime, Steve | Not eligible | Étienne, Jean | Not eligible | Exempt | Not eligible | Stay | – | Not eligible | Étienne, Maxime | Female Runner-Up (Day 64) | |
| Maxime | Not eligible | Elisabetta, Nancy | Not eligible | Isabelle, Stéphanie | Nominated | Lysandre, Stéphanie | Leave | Not eligible | Dominique, Stéphanie | Not eligible | Male Runner-Up (Day 64) | |
| Étienne | Not eligible | Elisabetta, Nancy | Not eligible | Isabelle, Stéphanie | Nominated | Lysandre, Stéphanie | Stay | Not eligible | Dominique, Elisabetta | Not eligible | Evicted (Day 57) | |
| Elisabetta | Benoît, Steve | Not eligible | Étienne, Mathieu | Not eligible | Exempt | Not eligible | Stay | Maxime | Not eligible | Evicted (Day 50) | | |
| Alexandre | Not eligible | Nancy, Stéphanie | Exempt | Isabelle, Stéphanie | Nominated | Elisabetta, Lysandre | Stay | Not eligible | Evicted (Day 43) | | | |
| Benoît | Not eligible | Evicted (Day 8) | | | | | Nominated | Evicted (Day 40) | | | | |
| Lysandre | Benoît, Steve | Not eligible | Maxime, Steve | Not eligible | Exempt | Not eligible | Evicted (Day 36) | | | | | |
| Jean-François | Not eligible | Elisabetta, Nancy | Not eligible | Elisabetta, Isabelle | Nominated | Evicted (Day 29) | | | | | | |
| Isabelle | Alexandre, Steve | Exempt | Étienne, Steve | Not eligible | Evicted (Day 29) | | | | | | | |
| Steve | Not eligible | Dominique, Elisabetta | Not eligible | Evicted (Day 22) | | | | | | | | |
| Nancy | Étienne, Jean-François | Not eligible | Evicted (Day 15) | | | | | | | | | |
| Notes | ^{2} | ^{3} | ^{4} | none | ^{5} | none | ^{6} | ^{7} | none | | | |
| Nominated For Eviction | Benoît, Steve | Elisabetta, Nancy | Étienne, Steve | Isabelle, Stéphanie | Alexandre, Étienne, Jean-François, Mathieu, Maxime | Elisabetta, Lysandre, Stéphanie | Benoît | Alexandre, Mathieu | Dominique, Elisabetta, Stéphanie | Étienne, Mathieu, Maxime | Mathieu, Maxime | Dominique, Stéphanie |
| Evicted | Benoît; Most votes to evict | Nancy; Most votes to evict | Steve; Most votes to evict | Isabelle; Most votes to evict | Jean; Most votes to evict | Lysandre; Most votes to evict | Benoît; 1 of 7 votes to evict | Alexandre; Most votes to evict | Elisabetta; Most votes to evict | Étienne; Most votes to evict | Maxime; Fewest votes to win | Dominique; Fewest votes to win |
| Evicted | Benoît; Most votes to evict | Nancy; Most votes to evict | Steve; Most votes to evict | Isabelle; Most votes to evict | Jean; Most votes to evict | Lysandre; Most votes to evict | Benoît; 1 of 7 votes to evict | Alexandre; Most votes to evict | Elisabetta; Most votes to evict | Étienne; Most votes to evict | Mathieu; Most votes to win | Stéphanie; Most votes to win |

- ^2 On Day one six females and seven males entered – this meant that the gender balances were unequal, and the women were asked to Evict one of the men. They chose Mathieu and he secretly moved into a Secret Room. After three days he returned and, in return, won $1,000 and immunity from the first Nominations.
- ^3 As survivor of the eviction, Steve was allowed to give Immunity o a female Housemate – he chose Isabella and she was Immune this Week.
- ^4 Survivor Elisabetta gave Immunity to Alexandre.
- ^5 This week all the men automatically faced the Public Vote to evict. Jean-François was evicted with the most Public Votes.
- ^6 Benoît today was voted back into the house by the public. However, whether he could stay and become a Housemate again eligible to win, depended on the other Housemates. Each Housemate had to vote on whether he should stay or leave. Only if everyone voted for him to stay would he be able to stay. The result was six votes to one for him to stay, the person voting against was Maxime. As the vote was not unanimous, Benoît had to leave the house again.
- ^7 The two survivors – Elisabetta and Stéphanie – were given the power this week to save one male Housemate from eviction. They chose to save Maxime and Étienne respectively – which left Alexandre and Mathieu to face the Public Vote.

The winners of the second season were Mathieu Baron and Stéphanie Bélanger. Each of them won a car and $50,000. The other participants were Dominique Julien (finalist), Maxime Hébert (finalist), Steve Carrier, Nancy Bouzi, Lysandre Maillot-Perron, Jean-François Janelle, Isabelle Perreault, Étienne Gagnon, Elisabetta Fantone, Benoît Marier and Alexandre Ouellet.

== Season 3 ==
Start Date: September 24, 2006
End Date: December 3, 2006
Duration: 71 days
Season 3 was hosted by Marie Plourde and Virginie Coossa, and was produced by Groupe Tele-Vision, under licence from Endemol.
The Winners: 3 – Shawn-Edward, Jean-Philippe & Kim
Losing Finalists: 3 – Brenda-Lee, David & Marie-Ève
Evicted Lofteurs: 8 – André, Charles, Christiana, Jennifer, Mélissa, Nathan, Priscilla & Vanessa
Walked Lofteurs: 1 – Kevins-Kyle

| | Week 1 | Week 2 | Week 3 | Week 4 | Week 5 | Week 6 | Week 7 | | Week 8 | Week 9 | | Week 10 Final | |
| | Week 1 | Week 2 | Week 3 | Week 4 | Week 5 | Week 6 | Day 44 | Day 46 | Week 8 | Day 60 | Day 61 | Week 10 Final | |
|---|---|---|---|---|---|---|---|---|---|---|---|---|---|
| Shawn-Edward | Vanessa, ? | Not eligible | Priscilla | No; Nominations | ?, ? | Not eligible | Not eligible | Brenda-Lee | Not eligible | Marie-Ève | Shawn-Edward | Male Winner (Day 71) | |
| Kim | Not eligible | ?, ? | Not eligible | No; Nominations | ?, ? | Jean-Philippe, Nathan | Mélissa | Not eligible | Jean-Philippe, Charles | David | Brenda-Lee | Female Winner (Day 71) | |
| Jean-Phillipe | Not in house | Not eligible | Priscilla | No; Nominations | ?, ? | Not eligible | Not eligible | Kim | Not eligible | Marie-Ève | Brenda-Lee | Male Winner (Day 71) | |
| Brenda-Lee | Not in house | Charles, ?, ? | Nominated | No; Nominations | ?, ? | Jean-Philippe, Nathan | Mélissa | Not eligible | Jean-Philippe, Charles | David | Jean-Phillipe | Female Runner-Up (Day 71) | |
| David | Jennifer, ? | Not eligible | Jennifer | No; Nominations | ?, ? | Not eligible | Not eligible | Kim | Exempt | Banned | Shawn-Edward | Male Runner-Up (Day 71) | |
| Marie-Ève | Not eligible | ?, ? | Not eligible | No; Nominations | ?, ? | Jean-Philippe, Nathan | Mélissa | Not eligible | Jean-Philippe, Shawn-Edward | David | Brenda-Lee | Third Place (Day 71) | |
| Charles | Christiana, Jennifer | Nominated | Brenda-Lee, Jennifer | No; Nominations | ?, ? | Not eligible | Not eligible | Kim | Not eligible | Evicted (Day 57) | | | |
| Mélissa | Not eligible | ?, ? | Not eligible | No; Nominations | ?, ? | Jean-Philippe, Nathan | Mélissa | Not eligible | Charles | Evicted (Day 50) | | | |
| Nathan | Vanessa, ? | Not eligible | Mélissa | No; Nominations | ?, ? | Not eligible | Evicted (Day 43) | | Charles | | | | |
| Christiana | Not eligible | ?, ? | Not eligible | No; Nominations | ?, ? | Evicted (Day 36) | | | Charles | | | | |
| Kevins-Kyle | Kim, ? | Not eligible | Mélissa | No; Nominations | Walked (Day 30) | | | | Charles | | | | |
| Priscilla | Exempt | ?, ? | Not eligible | No; Nominations | Evicted (Day 29) | | | | Charles | | | | |
| Jennifer | Not eligible | ?, ? | Not eligible | Evicted (Day 22) | | | | | Charles | | | | |
| André | Marie-Ève, Vanessa | Not eligible | Evicted (Day 15) | | | | | | Charles | | | | |
| Vanessa | Not eligible | Evicted (Day 8) | | | | | | | Charles | | | | |
| Notes | ^{a} | ^{b} | ^{c} ^{d} | ^{e} | ^{f} ^{g} ^{h} | ^{i} | ^{j} | | ^{k} ^{l} | ^{m} ^{n} ^{o} ^{p} | | ^{q} | |
| Against public vote | Kim, Vanessa | André, Charles | Brenda-Lee, Jennifer, Mélissa, Priscilla | All; Housemates | Christiana, ~~Shawn-Edward~~ | Jean-Philippe, Nathan | Kim, Mélissa | | Charles, Jean-Philippe | David, Marie-Ève | none | All; Housemates | |
| Against public vote | Kim, Vanessa | André, Charles | Brenda-Lee, Jennifer, Mélissa, Priscilla | All; Housemates | Christiana, Kim | Jean-Philippe, Nathan | Kim, Mélissa | | Charles, Jean-Philippe | David, Marie-Ève | none | All; Housemates | |
| Walked | none | | | | Kevins-Kyle | none | | | | | | | |
| Evicted | Vanessa; Most votes to evict | André; Most votes to evict | Jennifer; Most votes to evict | Priscilla; Most votes (out of 3) to evict | Christiana; Most votes to evict | Nathan; Most votes to evict | Mélissa; Most votes to evict | | Charles; Most votes to evict | No; Eviction | Brenda-Lee; 3 of 6 votes to fake evict | Marie-Ève; Fewest votes to win | Brenda-Lee; Fewest votes to win |
| Evicted | Vanessa; Most votes to evict | André; Most votes to evict | Jennifer; Most votes to evict | Priscilla; Most votes (out of 3) to evict | Christiana; Most votes to evict | Nathan; Most votes to evict | Mélissa; Most votes to evict | | Charles; Most votes to evict | No; Eviction | Brenda-Lee; 3 of 6 votes to fake evict | David; Fewest votes to win | Jean-Phillipe; Most votes to win |
| Evicted | Vanessa; Most votes to evict | André; Most votes to evict | Jennifer; Most votes to evict | Priscilla; Most votes (out of 3) to evict | Christiana; Most votes to evict | Nathan; Most votes to evict | Mélissa; Most votes to evict | | Charles; Most votes to evict | No; Eviction | Brenda-Lee; 3 of 6 votes to fake evict | Kim; Most votes to win | Shawn-Edward; Most votes to win |

Notes

- ^a This week the boys each had to nominate 2 of the girls. Priscilla is currently The Boss. The Boss has an immunity card which they can either use for themselves or give away to another housemate. Priscilla chose to make herself immune.
- ^b This week the girls each had to nominate 2 of the boys. Brenda-Lee is currently The Boss. This week the Boss had to choose the first nominee. The person chosen will directly up for eviction. Brenda-Lee chose Charles.
- ^c Last week the phone rang in the Loft and Jean-Philippe answered it. He was given 3 choices:(1) Whoever survives the eviction must give immunity to a girl. (2) Whoever survives the eviction must nominate a girl who will be up for eviction. (3) Whoever survives the eviction must choose 2 boys who won't be allowed to nominate. Jean-Philippe chose option 2. This meant that as Charles survived the eviction he had to choose a girl who would then be automatically up for eviction. Charles chose to nominate Brenda-Lee, who had automatically nominated him the previous week.
- ^d This week the boys each had to nominate 1 of the girls.
- ^e All housemates are automatically up for eviction this week. On Day 26, Charles, Christiana, Marie-Ève and Nathan were safe from eviction. On Day 28, Brenda-Lee, David and Melissa were safe from eviction. On Day 29, Kevins-Kyle and Kim were safe from eviction. Voting continues with Jean-Philippe, Priscilla & Shawn-Edward.
- ^f On Day 30, Kevins-Kyle has left the show with $10,000.
- ^g This week, housemates can nominate anyone. Shawn-Edward and Christiana received the most nominations and were initially up for eviction.
- ^h Kim is the current Boss and she was given a Power of Veto. This means she can save one of the nominees and replace them with someone else. She chose to save Shwn-Edward and replace him with herself, as she did not want to have to put up another person. Therefore, facing eviction this week are Christiana and Kim.
- ^i This week the girls had to each nominate 2 boys for eviction. The nominations were unanimous.
- ^j This week the girls are up for nominate and the boys are immune. Marie-Ève passed a secret mission earlier this week and won immunity. On Day 44, the 4 girls nominated Mélissa. On Day 46, the boys nominated individually as usual. They were left with a choice of either Brenda-Lee or Kim.
- ^k This week the boys were up for eviction and the girls were immune. David was also immune as he used the immunity bracelet which he had stolen.
- ^l All the ex-housemates were able to nominate individually and unanimously nominated Charles.
- ^m This week the boys had to nominate a girl and the girls had to nominate a boy. Shawn-Edward won a competition and could choose someone to be banned from nominating. He chose David.
- ^n On Day 61, in a surprise move, housemates had to vote for 1 person they wanted to evict. David and Marie-Ève were immune as they are currently nominated for eviction which the public are voting on. David and Marie-Ève were allowed to give immunity to another person, they chose Kim. With 3 votes Brenda-Lee has been evicted.
- ^o Day 62, after a few hours, Brenda-Lee returned to the House. It was revealed that her eviction was fake and that she hadn't actually left the house but was hiding in the diaryroom.
- ^p During the week the public were voting for who they wanted to save. However, it was revealed that these nominations were fake and that no-one would be evicted.
- ^q The public was voting for who to win.

== Season 4 ==
Start Date: September 26, 2007
End Date: December 5, 2007
Duration: 71 days
Winner: Mathieu "Cass" S.
Losing Finalist: Sébastien, Delphine, Thomas, Élodie & Véronika
Evicted Lofteurs: Mathieu "Blond" R., Christelle, Crystal, Yannick "Mimo/MimoFox", Vincent "Viny Boy", Francis "Frank", Marilyne, Stéphanie, Karine, Robert "Bob"

=== Nominations table ===
Undisclosed Nominations are represented by "N/A"

| | Week 1 | Week 2 | Week 3 | Week 4 | Week 5 | Week 6 | Week 7 | Week 8 | Week 9 | Week 10 Final | |
|---|---|---|---|---|---|---|---|---|---|---|---|
| Mathieu S. | Francis, Robert | Vincent, Francis | Sébastien, N/A | Francis | Sébastien, Vincent | No; Nominations | ?, ? | No; Nominations | ?, ? | Winner (Day 71) | |
| Sébastien | Robert, N/A | Exempt | Thomas, N/A | Nominated | Mathieu S, Vincent | No; Nominations | ?, ? | Exempt | ?, ? | Runner-Up (Day 71) | |
| Delphine | Veronika, Robert | Vincent, Karine | Sébastien, N/A | Crystal | ?, ? | No; Nominations | ?, ? | No; Nominations | ?, ? | Third Place (Day 71) | |
| Thomas | Francis, Robert | Élodie, Vincent | Sébastien, N/A | Nominated | ?, ? | Nominated | ?, ? | No; Nominations | ?, ? | Fourth Place (Day 71) | |
| Élodie | Veronika, N/A | Crystal, Karine | Sébastien, N/A | Nominated | ?, ? | No; Nominations | ?, ? | No; Nominations | ?, ? | Fifth Place (Day 71) | |
| Véronika | Élodie, Delphine | Exempt | —N/a | Vincent | Vincent, Francis | No; Nominations | ?, ? | No; Nominations | ?, ? | Sixth Place (Day 71) | |
| Mathieu R. | Robert, N/A | Exempt | —N/a | Delphine | ?, ? | No; Nominations | ?, ? | No; Nominations | ?, ? | Evicted (Day 64) | |
| Christelle | Robert, N/A | Exempt | Thomas, N/A | Veronika | ?, ? | No; Nominations | ?, ? | No; Nominations | Evicted (Day 57) | | |
| Crystal | Veronika, Robert | Vincent, Élodie | Sébastien, N/A | Not eligible | Sébastien, Véronika | No; Nominations | ?, ? | Evicted (Day 50) | | | |
| Yannick | Robert, N/A | Exempt | Thomas, N/A | Christelle | ?, ? | Nominated | Evicted (Day 43) | | | | |
| Vincent | Veronika, Robert | Thomas, Delphine | —N/a | Mathieu R. | ?, ? | Evicted (Day 36) | | | | | |
| Francis | Thomas, Robert | Karine, Crystal | Thomas, N/A | Yannick | ?, ? | Evicted (Day 36) | | | | | |
| Marilyne | —N/a | Exempt | —N/a | Nominated | Evicted (Day 29) | | | | | | |
| Stéphanie | Robert, N/A | Karine, Crystal | N/A | Evicted (Day 22) | | | | | | | |
| Karine | —N/a | Vincent, Élodie | Evicted (Day 15) | | | | | | | | |
| Robert | —N/a | Evicted (Day 8) | | | | | | | | | |
| Notes | ^{8} | ^{9} | ^{10} | ^{11} | | ^{12} | | ^{13} | | | |
| The Boss | Sébastien | Sébastien | Mathieu S. | Mathieu S. | none | | | Sébastien | none | ? | |
| Nominated for eviction | Robert, Stéphanie, Véronika | Karine, Stéphanie, Vincent | Stéphanie, Thomas, Yannick | Élodie, Marilyne, Sébastien, Thomas | Francis, Mathieu S., Sébastien, Thomas, Vincent | Thomas, Yannick | Christelle, Crystal, Élodie, Véronika | All; Housemates (Except Sébastien) | Mathieu R., Mathieu S., Sébastien, Thomas | Delphine, Élodie, Mathieu S, Sébastien, Thomas, Véronika | |
| Evicted | Robert; Most votes to evict | Karine; Most votes to evict | Stéphanie; Most votes to evict | Marilyne; Most votes to evict | Francis; Most votes to evict | Yannick; Most votes to evict | Crystal; Most votes to evict | Christelle; Most votes to evict | Mathieu R. Most votes to evict | Véronika; Fewest votes (out of 6) | Élodie; Fewest votes (out of 5) |
| Evicted | Robert; Most votes to evict | Karine; Most votes to evict | Stéphanie; Most votes to evict | Marilyne; Most votes to evict | Francis; Most votes to evict | Yannick; Most votes to evict | Crystal; Most votes to evict | Christelle; Most votes to evict | Mathieu R. Most votes to evict | Thomas; Fewest votes (out of 4) | Delphine; Fewest votes (out of 3) |
| Evicted | Robert; Most votes to evict | Karine; Most votes to evict | Stéphanie; Most votes to evict | Marilyne; Most votes to evict | Vincent; Most votes to evict | Yannick; Most votes to evict | Crystal; Most votes to evict | Christelle; Most votes to evict | Mathieu R. Most votes to evict | Thomas; Fewest votes (out of 4) | Delphine; Fewest votes (out of 3) |
| Evicted | Robert; Most votes to evict | Karine; Most votes to evict | Stéphanie; Most votes to evict | Marilyne; Most votes to evict | Vincent; Most votes to evict | Yannick; Most votes to evict | Crystal; Most votes to evict | Christelle; Most votes to evict | Mathieu R. Most votes to evict | Sébastien; Fewest votes (out of 2) | Mathieu S. Most votes to win |

^8 Sébastien is currently The Boss. He had to choose another Housemate who would then be automatically nominated for the first 3 evictions - he chose Stéphanie.
^9 Sébastien is currently The Boss. He had to choose 5 Housemates (2 male & 3 female) who would be immune from eviction. He chose Christelle, Marilyne, Mathieu R, Veronika and Yannick.
^10 Mathieu S. is currently The Boss. He had to choose a Housemate who would be automatically up for eviction. He chose Yannick. The Housemates then had to decide if the 3rd nominee should be male or female. They decided it should be male.
^11 Mathieu S. is currently The Boss and was immune. This week's nominations were a chain of immunity. First, Mathieu S. gave immunity to a Housemate of his choice. Then that Housemate gave immunity to another Housemate and so on until 4 remained. Élodie, Marilyne, Sébastien and Thomas are up for eviction this week as they were not chosen in the chain of immunity.
^12 Thomas and Yannick dislike each other and no longer wish to remain in the House together. A proposal was made by Yannick that Thomas accepted. The proposal was that Thomas and Yannick volunteer to be up for eviction. Big Brother also accepted this proposal and the nominations were Cancelled. Thomas and Yannick are therefore voluntarily up for eviction.
^13 All Housemates are automatically nominated for eviction this week with the exception of Sébastien who is immune as he is the Head of House.

== Season 5 ==
Start Date: September 28, 2008.
End Date: December 7, 2008.
Duration: 71 days.
The Finalists: Charles-Éric (The Winner), Kevin (Runner-up), Geneviève (3rd), Mihaela (4th) and Cynthia Sa (5th).
Evicted: Arcadio (twice), Claude-Alexandre, Cynthia Sc, Isabelle, Jason, Manuel, Maude, Myriam & Rémi.

| | Week 1 | | Week 2 | | Week 3 | Week 4 | Week 5 | Week 6 | Week 7 | Week 8 | Week 9 | Week 10 Final | |
| | Day 3 | Day 4 | Day 9 | Day 11 | Week 3 | Week 4 | Week 5 | Week 6 | Week 7 | Week 8 | Week 9 | Week 10 Final | |
|---|---|---|---|---|---|---|---|---|---|---|---|---|---|
| Charles-Éric | Isabelle | N/A | —N/a | —N/a | Not eligible | Nominated | —N/a | —N/a | Geneviève, Manuel | —N/a | —N/a | Winner (Day 71) | |
| Kevin | Jason | N/A | Claude-Alexandre | N/A, Charles-Éric | Jason, N/A | Nominated | —N/a | —N/a | Geneviève, Manuel | N/A | Arcadio | Runner-Up (Day 71) | |
| Geneviève | Exempt | | Nominated | Isabelle, Kevin | Arcadio, Charles-Éric | Exempt | N/A | —N/a | Arcadio, Mihaela | —N/a | —N/a | Third place (Day 71) | |
| Mihaela | Myriam | Maude | Geneviève | Isabelle, N/A | Jason, Manuel | Nominated | —N/a | —N/a | Geneviève, Charles-Éric | —N/a | —N/a | Fourth Place (Day 71) | |
| Cynthia Sa | Myriam | —N/a | Claude-Alexandre | Arcadio, Manuel | Exempt | Nominated | —N/a | —N/a | Manuel, Geneviève | —N/a | Nominated | Fifth Place (Day 71) | |
| Arcadio | Kevin | Cynthia Sc | —N/a | Isabelle, N/A | Manuel, N/A | Exempt | —N/a | —N/a | Geneviève, Manuel | —N/a | Nominated | Re-Evicted (Day 64) | |
| Manuel | Isabelle | N/A | —N/a | —N/a | —N/a | Exempt | —N/a | —N/a | Charles-Éric, Cynthia Sa | —N/a | Evicted (Day 57) | | |
| Cynthia Sc | Myriam | Maude | Geneviève | Isabelle, Arcadio | Arcadio, Charles-Éric | Exempt | —N/a | —N/a | Arcadio, Geneviève | Evicted (Day 50) | | | |
| Claude-Alexandre | Exempt | | Nominated | Evicted (Day 9) | | | —N/a | —N/a | Re-Evicted (Day 43) | | | | |
| Rémi | Kevin | Isabelle | —N/a | Geneviève, N/A | Not eligible | Exempt | —N/a | Evicted (Day 36) | | | | | |
| Myriam | Isabelle | Isabelle | —N/a | Isabelle, Kevin | Exempt | Nominated | Evicted (Day 29) | | | | | | |
| Jason | Kevin | Cyntha Sc | Nominated | Isabelle, N/A | Not eligible | Evicted (Day 22) | | | | | | | |
| Isabelle | Myriam | Maude | —N/a | Mihaela, Kevin | Evicted (Day 15) | | | | | | | | |
| Maude | Mihaela | —N/a | Claude-Alexandre | Evicted (Day 8) | | | | | | | | | |
| Notes | ^{14} | | ^{15} | ^{16} | ^{17},^{18} | ^{19} | ^{20} | None | ^{21} | ^{21},^{22} | ^{21},^{23} | ^{24} | |
| Nominated for eviction | Isabelle, Maude, Myriam | | Claude-Alexandre, Geneviève, Jason | Isabelle, Manuel | Arcadio, Charles-Éric, Jason | Charles-Éric, Cynthia Sa, Kevin, Mihaela, Myriam | Arcadio, Charles-Éric, Kevin, Rémi | Claude-Alexandre, Manuel | Cynthia Sc, Geneviève, Manuel | Arcadio, Manuel | Arcadio, Cynthia Sa | Charlies-Éric, Cynthia Sa, Geneviève, Kevin, Mihaela | |
| Evicted | Maude; Most votes to evict | | Claude-Alexandre; Most votes to evict | Isabelle; Most votes to evict | Jason; Most votes to evict | Claude-Alexandre; Chosen to return | Rémi; Most votes to evict | Claude-Alexandre; Most votes to evict | Cynthia Sc; Most votes to evict | Manuel; Most votes to evict | Arcadio; Most votes to evict | Cynthia Sa; Fewest votes (out of 5) | Mihaela; Fewest votes (out of 4) |
| Evicted | Maude; Most votes to evict | | Claude-Alexandre; Most votes to evict | Isabelle; Most votes to evict | Jason; Most votes to evict | Claude-Alexandre; Chosen to return | Rémi; Most votes to evict | Claude-Alexandre; Most votes to evict | Cynthia Sc; Most votes to evict | Manuel; Most votes to evict | Arcadio; Most votes to evict | Geneviève; Fewest votes (out of 3) | Kevin; Fewest votes (out of 2) |
| Evicted | Maude; Most votes to evict | | Claude-Alexandre; Most votes to evict | Isabelle; Most votes to evict | Arcadio; Most votes to evict | Myriam; Most votes to evict | Rémi; Most votes to evict | Claude-Alexandre; Most votes to evict | Cynthia Sc; Most votes to evict | Manuel; Most votes to evict | Arcadio; Most votes to evict | Geneviève; Fewest votes (out of 3) | Kevin; Fewest votes (out of 2) |
| Evicted | Maude; Most votes to evict | | Claude-Alexandre; Most votes to evict | Isabelle; Most votes to evict | Arcadio; Most votes to evict | Myriam; Most votes to evict | Rémi; Most votes to evict | Claude-Alexandre; Most votes to evict | Cynthia Sc; Most votes to evict | Manuel; Most votes to evict | Arcadio; Most votes to evict | Charles-Éric; Most votes to win | |

^14 Claude-Alexandre and Geneviève were taking part in a secret mission, and as a result were exempt from this round of nominations. As Isabelle received most nominations, this means that Males will be given automatic immunity for following day.
^15 Since Day 1, Claude-Alexandre and Geneviève were taking part in a secret mission, which later included Jason, as the mission has completed, it was announced that one of them must go, and the housemates voted to evict either Claude-Alexandre, Geneviève or Jason, they were not permitted to vote. Even though evicted, Maude was allowed to nominate.
^16 This week housemates voted twice, first, to determine the first nominee, then, second time, to determine the second nominee. Initially it was Isabelle and Kevin who had the most votes, but after Geneviève won the Power of Veto, she was able to save one of the nominees and she chose to save Kevin, she could also replace the nominee, and she choose Manuel.
^17 Cynthia Sc and Kevin were immune as they are the current Heads of House. This week only the males could be nominated, meaning that all the females were immune. In the recent Canadian General Election there was a 58% turnout. The Master (Big Brother) decided that there should be a 58% turnout in the nominations, meaning that only 6 Housemates were allowed to nominate. Cynthia Sc and Kevin, the Heads of House, had to choose the 6 Housemates that could nominate and they chose themselves, Arcadio, Geneviève, Manuel and Mihaela. This meant that Charles-Éric, Cynthia Sa, Jason, Myriam and Rémi were not allowed to nominate.
^18 During last week, Jason broke a number of rules and was put up for eviction. The public could choose either to evict him, punish him for the next 3 week, or punish the whole house, the public choose to evict him. Arcadio was also evicted, but as Jason was previously evicted, Arcadio was given the power to bring either himself, or Jason back into the house, and he choose himself, therefore he is now a full housemate again.
^19 This week all housemates automatically faced the public vote, Arcadio, Cynthia Sa, Geneviève, Manuel and Rémi won immunity, meaning that Charles-Éric, Cynthia Sa, Kevin, Mihaela and Myriam faced the public vote.
^20 Claude-Alexandre re-entered the house Loft as a Mole for The Master, he cannot win, but can be nominated and evicted, as it is unknown whether he is exempt or not. As Head of House, Geneviève was immune from this eviction.
^21 Kevin won 'eternal immunity' which gave him a free pass to the finale. Cynthia Sc obtained 'eternal nomination', which gave her automatic nomination for the rest of her stay.
^22 Mihaela was immune as she was the current Head of House.
^23 This week, the public were nominating, and the housemate were evicting, Arcadio and Cynthia Sa received the most public votes and were nominated for eviction.
^24 The public was voting for who to win.

== Season 6 ==
The 6th season of Loft Story, titled Loft Story : La revanche (an All-Star edition), competed housemates of the last five seasons. The show started on March 29, 2009 on TQS.

=== Housemates ===
Housemates choice by the public:

- Cynthia Sauro (Loft Story 5)
- Dominique Julien (Loft Story 2)
- Hugues Dubé (Loft Story 1)
- Mathieu Baron (Loft Story 2)
- Mathieu Surprenant, "Cass" (Loft Story 4)
- Sébastien Tremblay (Loft Story 4)

Housemates choice by the channel TQS:

- Alexandra (Occupation Double 4)
- Arcadio Marcuzzi (Loft Story 5)
- Christelle Huot (Loft Story 4)
- Cynthia Schaefer, "Cinny" (Loft Story 5)
- David Tremblay (Loft Story 3)
- Delphine Constantin Constantin (Loft Story 4)
- Gabriel Julien (Occupation Double 4)
- Geneviève Deneault (Loft Story 5)
- Kevin Lambert, "Kevins-Kyle" (Loft Story 3)
- Priscilla Lanni (Loft Story 3)

Housemates has been in the casting process:

- Brenda-Lee Tamaya-Chabot (Loft Story 3)
- Crystal Dumas (Loft Story 4)
- Francis Benoit (Loft Story 4)
- Jean-Philippe Anwar (Loft Story 3)
- Mélanie Leclaire (Loft Story 1)
- Myriam Lamontagne (Loft Story 5)
- Rémi Messier (Loft Story 5)
- Thomas Girard (Loft Story 4)

=== Nominations table ===
| | Week 1 | | Week 2 | | Week 3 | Week 4 | Week 5 | Week 6 | Week 7 | Week 8 | Week 9 Final | |
| | Day 3 | Day 5 | Day 8 | Day 15 | Week 3 | Week 4 | Week 5 | Week 6 | Week 7 | Week 8 | Week 9 Final | |
|---|---|---|---|---|---|---|---|---|---|---|---|---|
| Sébastien | Team B | No; Nomination | Christelle | Exempt | Cynny | Mathieu B, Alexandra | Christelle | Exempt | No; Nomination | David, Arcadio, Hugues, Cynny | Winner (Day 64) | |
| Hugues | Team B | No; Nomination | Christelle | Geneviève | Cynny | Arcadio, Dominique | Christelle | Nominated | No; Nomination | Sébastien, Arcadio, Dominique, Priscilla | Runner-Up (Day 64) | |
| David | Team A | Exempt | Mathieu S. | Geneviève | Cynny | Arcadio, Dominique | Christelle | Nominated | No; Nomination | Sébastien, Arcadio, Dominique, Priscilla | Third Place (Day 64) | |
| Priscilla | Not in House | | | Geneviève | Cynny | Mathieu B, Delphine | Christelle | Exempt | No; Nomination | David, Arcadio, Hugues, Cynny | Fourth Place (Day 64) | |
| Cynny | Team B | No; Nomination | Mathieu S. | Geneviève | Hugues | Sébastien, Dominique | Christelle | Exempt | No; Nomination | Sébastien, Arcadio, Dominique, Priscilla | Fifth Place (Day 64) | |
| Dominique | Team B | No; Nomination | Mathieu S. | Cynny | Cynny | Mathieu B., Delphine | Christelle | Exempt | No; Nomination | Sébastien, Hugues, Cynny, Priscilla | Sixth Place (Day 64) | |
| Arcadio | Team A | Exempt | Christelle | Cynny | Cynny | Mathieu B., Christelle | Christelle | Nominated | No; Nomination | Sébastien, Priscilla, Hugues, David | Evicted (Day 57) | |
| Alexandra | Team A | Exempt | Christelle | Banned | Cynny | Sébastien, Dominique | Cynny | Exempt | No; Nomination | Evicted (Day 50) | | |
| Mathieu B. | Team A | Exempt | Mathieu S. | Geneviève | Not eligible | Sébastien, Dominique | Cynny | Nominated | Evicted (Day 43) | | | |
| Christelle | Nominated | Cynthia | Mathieu S. | Geneviève | Cynny | Sébastien, Dominique | Cynny | Evicted (Day 36) | | | | |
| Delphine | Team A | Exempt | Mathieu S. | Geneviève | Not eligible | Sébastien, Dominique | Evicted (Day 29) | | | | | |
| Kevins-Kyle | Team A | Exempt | Mathieu S. | Hugues | Not eligible | Walked (Day 22) | | | | | | |
| Geneviève | Team B | No; Nomination | Christelle | Cynny | Evicted (Day 15) | | | | | | | |
| Mathieu S. | Team B | No; Nomination | Christelle | Evicted (Day 8) | | | | | | | | |
| Gabriel | Team A | Exempt | Walked (Day 6) | | | | | | | | | |
| Cynthia | Team B | No; Nomination | Evicted (Day 6) | | | | | | | | | |
| Notes | ^{25} | ^{26}, ^{27}, ^{28} | ^{29}, ^{30} | ^{31}, ^{32} | ^{33}, ^{34} | ^{35}, ^{36} | ^{37} | ^{38} | ^{39} | ^{40} | ^{41} | |
| Nominated for eviction | Christelle, Cynthia | | Christelle, Cynny, David, Geneviève, Hugues, Mathieu S. | Christelle, Cynny, David, Geneviève, Hugues, Kevins-Kyle | Christelle, Cynny, David, Hugues, Kevins-Kyle | Arcadio, Delphine, Dominique, Mathieu B., Sébastien | Alexandra, Christelle, Cynny, David, Hugues | Arcadio, David, Hugues, Mathieu B. | All Housemates | Arcadio, Hugues, Priscilla, Sébastien | Cynny, David, Dominique, Hugues, Priscilla, Sébastien | |
| Walked | none | Gabriel | none | | Kevins-Kyle | none | | | | | | |
| Evicted | Cynthia; Evicted by competition | | Mathieu S. 7 of 13 votes to evict | Geneviève; 7 of 11 votes to evict | Eviction; Cancelled | Delphine; Fewest votes to save | Christelle; 7 of 10 votes to evict | Mathieu B. Fewest votes to save | Alexandra; Fewest votes to save | Arcadio; Fewest votes to save | Dominique; Fewest votes (out of 6) | Cynny; Fewest votes (out of 5) |
| Evicted | Cynthia; Evicted by competition | | Mathieu S. 7 of 13 votes to evict | Geneviève; 7 of 11 votes to evict | Eviction; Cancelled | Delphine; Fewest votes to save | Christelle; 7 of 10 votes to evict | Mathieu B. Fewest votes to save | Alexandra; Fewest votes to save | Arcadio; Fewest votes to save | Priscilla; Fewest votes (out of 4) | David; Fewest votes (out of 3) |
| Evicted | Cynthia; Evicted by competition | | Mathieu S. 7 of 13 votes to evict | Geneviève; 7 of 11 votes to evict | Eviction; Cancelled | Delphine; Fewest votes to save | Christelle; 7 of 10 votes to evict | Mathieu B. Fewest votes to save | Alexandra; Fewest votes to save | Arcadio; Fewest votes to save | Hugues; Fewest votes (out of 2) | Sébastien; Most votes to win |

^25 The Housemates divided into two teams. Christelle was not chosen to be in either team and was automatically up for eviction.
^26 The teams competed in a series of immunity challenges. Team A won the challenge and are immune from the next eviction. Team A could choose a team member who would also be immune from the second eviction and they chose Alexandra.
^27 Christelle, the first nominee, was the only Housemate allowed to nominate. She nominated Cynthia.
^28 The first evictee was decided by a competition rather than a vote. Christelle, won the competition meaning that Cynthia was evicted. Gabriel voluntarily left the show as he was not coping well with the recent death of his mother.
^29 The public voted for their favourite. The six Housemates with the fewest votes would be nominated for eviction. Christelle, Cynny, David, Geneviève, Hugues and Mathieu S received the fewest votes and are nominated. The Housemates voted for who they wanted to be evicted.
^30 Priscilla entered the House as a replacement Housemate for Gabriel.
^31 The public voted for their favourite. The six Housemates with the fewest votes would be nominated for eviction. Sébastien was not part of the vote as he gained immunity in a competition. Christelle, Cynny, David, Hugues, Geneviève and Kevins-Kyle received the fewest votes and are nominated. The Housemates voted for who they wanted to be evicted.
^32 Alexandra was banned from voting as punishment for multiple rule-breaking. Sébastien was not part of the vote as he gained immunity and lost his voting rights in a competition.
^33 The public voted for their favourite. The five Housemates with the fewest votes would be nominated for eviction. Christelle, Cynny, David, Hugues and Kevins-Kyle received the fewest votes and are nominated. The Housemates voted for who they wanted to be evicted.
^34 Delphine, Kevins-Kyle and Mathieu B. lost their voting rights in a competition.
^35 Cynny lost the evicted vote by 8–1. But Kevins-Kyle sacrificed himself by voluntarily leaving the House. This meant that the voting was voided and Cynny was not evicted.
^36 This week the rules changed back to the traditional Big Brother format, with the Housemates doing the nominating. The 4 or more Housemates with the most nominations would be up for eviction.
^37 The public voted for their favourite. The five Housemates with the fewest votes would be nominated for eviction. Alexandra, Christelle, Cynny, David and Hugues received the fewest votes and are nominated. The Housemates voted for who they wanted to be evicted.
^38 The producers decided to give immunity to all female Housemates. Sébastien won immunity in a competition.
^39 All Housemates are automatically nominated for eviction.
^40 This week the Housemates had to each make four nominations.
^41 The public was voting for who to win.
