= Bar (Polish TV series) =

Polish reality television series

- Genre: Reality
- Country of origin: Poland
- No. of seasons: 6

Production
- Production company: Strix

Original release
- Network: Polsat
- Release: March 2, 2002 – December 18, 2004
- Network: TV4
- Release: September 24 – December 10, 2005

Related
- The Bar

Bar is the Polish local version of the reality show The Bar. The show aired on Polsat (series 1–5) and TV4 (series 6).

"Bar" was to work in one of the apartments in Wrocław and doing as much as the daily takings. About staying in the program determined both persons involved in the struggle (vote plus-minus), and the audience (by calling a special number or sending SMS). In the first edition of the Bar was in the basement of a department store Solpol at Świdnicka street, in the next – in the dining pavilion between the bridges on Kepa Mieszczańska (demolished in May 2006).

The program was created under license from Swedish TV production company Strix.

Leading in all the editions was Krzysztof Ibisz. The program consisted of tracking the fate of several participants in the program both at work in the premises, "Bar" and in the house. Participants scratching each week viewers vote SMSowego decision, sitting on the so-called. "Hot seat" to the finals, where he fought for the title of winner of two people. In the first, third and sixth edition of the winners received cash prizes, in the second edition was flat in Warsaw "Saska Kepa" in the fourth six bars of pure gold, while the fifth car in the Porsche.

== History ==
The first two editions have been completed in the year 2002 and it seemed then that this was the end of the show, like many reality TV programs, issued earlier by TV Polsat. After a year of "Bar" but he returned to television screens. The third edition in front of television attracted a much larger audience, advertised already familiar faces – boxer Yvonne Guzowski and controversial contestants of "Big Brother" Agnes Frykowski . After the success of the third edition issued fourth Polsat, enjoys the viewing figures even more. It had however changed the formula, and a significant portion of participants were the most popular participants in previous editions of the "Bar", shortly before the program ended, " Knight to take "a TVN -owski "Big Brother". Polsat again went for a blow, and after a few months the screens became the fifth edition of the program. Apart from anyone unknown to the program participants were also invited "VIPs", as it turned out they were in the majority of children of known parents. Was attended among others Torzewska Agata, Jacek Korwin-Mikke, and brothers Cugowscy. The fifth edition, however, did not repeat the previous success. Yet after a year decided to break the sixth installment. It was advertised slogan " Europa Bar "and characterized by the fact that apart from the Poles also took eight participants from other European countries – Greece, Ukraine, Russia, Italy, Lithuania and Great Britain. This edition has reached the smallest audience of the past. It is even said that it was therefore shortened by two weeks. Probably the reason was that it was not implemented like the previous on Polsat, but the station TV 4 . After the sixth edition appeared about the next, having to bear the title " World Bar ", though not Polsat plans to soon return program.

== Rules ==
The game began with more than a dozen people (this number varied depending on the subsequent editions). All editions also featured new entrants, falling already during the program, usually at someone's place. The program lasted about three months. Players stayed employed as a staff in place, "Bar" and worked hard under the watchful eye of raw boss – Jack Koch. At the beginning of the "Bar" was on the Świdnicka street Wrocław in the basement of the house for Commodities "Solpol" program and later moved to the pavilion catering "between the bridges" at Prince Street, Witold 2 (demolished in May 2006 ). The camera is also accompanied by our heroes outside of work, in a house barowiczów located in most editions of Wrocław Bielany (in the second edition was flat in the city center). Viewers watched their every day relationships – conflicts, friendships, and sometimes even affection. Participants also often got different types of additional tasks, they also organized trips to interesting places, where, of course, also accompanied them to the camera. Every Thursday the program took place live in the studio, where each participant had to admit one person "plus" and one "minus" for the past week. The person with the highest number of "cons" occupied the first hot seat, and the person with the most "pros" had to decide who would occupy the second. Every Saturday, the next program of live viewers through SMS vote decided which of the people sitting on the "hot seat" to exit the program. Live programs were also an opportunity for participants to discuss various topics and answering very personal questions sometimes led to.

== Trivia and statistics ==
- Two participants in the first edition – Iza Kowalczyk and Gregory Markocki took during the wedding. It was the first such situation in the history of "Bar" in the world. This relationship did not survive.
- In the third edition, the fifth leading hot chair Krzysztof Ibisz badly read out the results of voting viewers, and instead of Edith Robocień, the program has left Christopher Kusik.
- In the sixth edition of Bar the shows production were seen by some as favouring Thomas Ames, with critics regarding the live shows as amounting to a smear campaign on other participants. In interviews Ames has agreed that there was bias shown by producers but has also said he enjoyed the prize money which he used to buy a car and return to education.
- On the announcement of the final result of Season 6 Thomas Ames shouted "flipping come on". This was misunderstood by some Polish viewers as 'feck Poland'. Ames strongly denied this in subsequent interviews saying he would never say something offensive about his adopted home.
- The sixth edition instead of the standard two came up to the final four participants.

== Seasons ==
Series/Name	Presenter(s)	Launch date	Finale date	Days	Contestants	Winner
Bar	Krzysztof Ibisz	2 March 2002	1 June 2002	92	16	Adrian Urban
Bar II	Krzysztof Ibisz	14 September 2002	13 December 2002	91	18	Eric Alira
Bar Bez Granic	Krzysztof Ibisz	13 September 2003	20 December 2003	99	24	Maciej Kiślewski
Bar Złoto dla Zuchwałych	Krzysztof Ibisz	28 February 2004	12 June 2004	106	37	Mirosława Eichler, "Mirka"
Bar Vip	Krzysztof Ibisz	11 September 2004	18 December 2004	99	29	Ewelina Ciura
Bar Europa	Krzysztof Ibisz	24 September 2005	10 December 2005	78	22	Thomas Ames
