= Baren =

Baren may refer to:

- Baren (printing tool), a disk-like hand tool in Japanese woodblock printing
- The Bar (franchise), or Baren, a reality competition television franchise that originated in Sweden
  - Baren (Danish TV series)
  - Baren (Norwegian TV series)
  - Baren (Swedish TV series)

== People ==
- Baren (author) (1901–1972), Chinese writer, critic, and translator
- Kees van Baaren (1906–1970), Dutch composer and teacher
- Gerardus van Baren (1882-1952), Dutch politician; see Timeline of Delft

== Places ==
- Baren, Haute-Garonne, France

=== Xinjiang, China ===
- Baren, Payzawat County, a town in Payzawat County, Kashgar Prefecture
- Baren Township, Akto County, Kizilsu Kyrgyz Autonomous Prefecture
- Barin Township, Kargilik County, also Baren Township, a in Xinjiang
- Barin Township, Shule County, also Baren Township, a in Xinjiang

== See also ==
- Barin (disambiguation)
