= The Bar (franchise) =

Reality competition television franchise

- Created by: Strix
- Original work: Baren (Sweden)
- Years: 2000–present

Films and television
- Television series: The Bar (independent international versions, see below)

Miscellaneous
- Genre: Reality competition
- First aired: 24 April 2000; 25 years ago

The Bar (Swedish: Baren) is a reality competition television franchise that originated in Sweden in 2000. It also started to air in Norway the same year and was developed in other countries starting from 2001. The premise of the show is that for around two months, a number of contestants work in a bar while attempting to avoid periodic public-vote evictions from a communal house and hence win a cash prize. The show was devised by the Swedish company Strix. The show first aired on TV3 Sweden on 24 April 2000.

== Concept ==
The aim of The Bar is for contestants to remain for as long as possible, with the power to decide who stays or goes in the hands of the viewers. The program claims to illustrate what happens when strangers live together and attempt to run a city center bar. The Bar is an interactive program where both viewers and internet users are part of the action. More than 25 webcams broadcast 24 hours a day in the bar and the participants’ apartment. Viewers were urged to take decisions and affect the story lines. The bar in the show was open to the public, meaning that the viewers could visit and talk to the contestants.

A series is shown over approximately three months, with a host-led live broadcast at the end of each week. There, the contestants discuss the past six days’ events. Contestants rate each other on their performances. The one with the lowest score becomes one of two nominees who can be voted out by TV viewers during the live elimination show. In addition, the contestant with the highest score gets to choose the second nominee who can be voted out.

Throughout the live show, a viewer poll is held by phone and via the Web. At the end of the series, after 11 elimination rounds, one winner remains to claim the cash prize.

== Rules ==
=== Format ===
- If a Bartender (contestant) neglects their duties, they may be punished by the Bar Manager.
- If a Bartender receives two warnings, they are disqualified from the show.
- Bartenders must not leave the bar while on duty without permission.
- There must be at least four bartenders on duty during opening hours.
- Bartenders must not consume any alcohol whilst on duty.
- Bartenders must not lend out money from the till.

=== Plus/Minus ===
On Wednesday evenings there is a "Plus/Minus" meeting:

- Each bartender awards a minus to the bartender who they think should be eliminated.
- Each bartender awards a plus to the bartender who they think most deserves to stay.
- Minuses are deducted from pluses. The bartender with the lowest score will be the first person to be nominated for elimination.
- The bartender with the highest score will nominate a second person for elimination.
- The public will decide which of the two nominated bartenders will be eliminated from the show.

== International versions ==
There are currently 20 versions and 45 winners of The Bar format. The most recent winner is Sandi Jug from Slovenia.

Region	Local name	Channel	Winner	Main Presenters
Argentina	El Bar TV	América 2	Season 1, 2001: Federico Blanco; Season 2, 2001: Diego Plotino	Andy Kusnetzoff
Cambodia	CTN Coffee Shop	CTN	Season 1, 2006: Lida Siv	
Croatia	Bar	Nova TV	Season 1, 2005: Damir Milanović	Marin Ivanović "Stoka"
Czech Republic	Bar	TV Prima	Season 1, 2006: Marcela Baldas	Libor Bouček; Laďka Něrgešová
Denmark	Baren	TV3	Season 1, 2001: Erkan Kilic; Season 2, 2002: Noel Johansen	Mikkel Beha Erichsen
Estonia	Baar	Kanal 2	Season 1, 2004: Annika Kiidron; Season 2, 2005: Alari Arnover	
Finland	Baari	SubTV	Season 1, 2006: Frank Tammin	Kirsi Salo; Silvia Modig
Georgia	GeoBar	Rustavi 2	Season 1, 2005: Beso Sarjveladze; Season 2, 2006: Dato Geladze "Chele"; Season 3, 2006: Irakli Markhulia; Season 4, 2007: Dea Anna Adamia	Nino Khoshtaria (Season 1–4)
Greece	Bar (Season 1); Party (Season 2)	Mega TV	Season 1, 2002: Andreas Paraskakis; Season 2, 2003: Maria Tsolaki "Lara"	Miltos Makridis (1); Katerina Laspa (2)
Hungary	Bár	Viasat 3	Season 1, 2001: Tiger; Season 2, 2008: Dániel Izer Zoltán "Duda"	Péter Novák (1); Péter Majoros, Lia Kustánczi (2)
Latvia	Bārs	TV3	Season 1, 2003: Uldis Jēkabsons	Viesturs Buivids
Lithuania	Baras	LNK	Season 1, 2003: Laimis Bartasūnas; Season 2, 2004: Andrius Surblys	Egidijus Knispelis (1); Haroldas Mackevičius (2-3)
Lithuania	Baras 3 (All-Stars & Civilians)	LNK	Season 3, 2005: Skaistė Būtytė	Egidijus Knispelis (1); Haroldas Mackevičius (2-3)
Lithuania	2 Barai	TV3	Season 4, 2016: Julius Mocka; Season 5, 2017: Kristupas Albužis	Vaida Skaisgirė; Justinas Jankevičius
Mexico	El bar provoca	Televisa	Season 1, 2006: José Luis Hernández García ("Piter Punk")	Roberto Palazuelos; Roxana Castellanos
Netherlands	The Bar	Yorin	Season 1, 2002: Camiel Vlasman	Matthias Scholten
Norway	Baren	TV3	Season 1, 2000: Jamila Brodin; Season 2, 2001: Bjørn Sjulstok	Anders Høglund (1–2)
Poland	Bar	Polsat	Season 1, 2002: Adrian Urban; Season 2, 2002: Eric Alira; Season 3, 2003: Maciej Kiślewski	Krzysztof Ibisz (1–6)
Poland	Bar Złoto dla Zuchwałych (Reality All-Stars and civilian versions)	Polsat	Season 4, 2004: Mirka Eichler	Krzysztof Ibisz (1–6)
Poland	Bar Vip (Celebrity & Anonymous Contestants)	Polsat	Season 5, 2004: Ewelina Ciura	Krzysztof Ibisz (1–6)
Poland	Bar Europa (European Contestants)	TV4	Season 6, 2005: Thomas Amos	Krzysztof Ibisz (1–6)
Portugal	O Bar da TV	SIC	Season 1, 2001: Hoji Fortuna	Jorge Gabriel
Serbia	Bar	Kurir TV	Season 1, 2021–22: Davor Darmanović	Jelena Nikolić
Slovenia	Bar	POP TV (1–2); Planet TV (3–4)	Season 1, 2005: Andrej Lavrič; Season 2, 2006: Emil Širić; Season 3, 2015: Črt Banko; Season 4, 2018: Sandi Jug	Sebastjan Kepic (1–3); Jasna Kuljaj (4); Domen Kumer (4)
Sweden	Baren	TV3 (1–5); TV12 (6)	Season 1, 2000: Jocke Ekberg; Season 2, 2001: Dick Lundberg; Season 3, 2002: Tommy Öhver; Season 4, 2003: Mathias Edlund; Season 5, 2004: Daniel Hansen; Season 6, 2015: Ellinor Bjurström	Robert Aschberg (1–5); Paolo Roberto (6)
Switzerland	Die Bar	TV3	Season 1, 2001: Caroline	Yves Schifferle
United Kingdom	Hot Mess Summer	Amazon Prime Video	Season 1, 2023: TBA	Rylan Clark

== Similar shows ==
These are formats similar to The Bar, but are not licensed Strix productions:

- United Kingdom – Bar Wars
- Uruguay – Playa Bar TV
- Chile – Guerra de Bares
- Slovakia – Pláž 33

== See also ==
- List of television show franchises
