= Barin =

Barin may refer to:

- Barin, Georgia, a place in Muscogee County, Georgia, United States
- Barin, Iran (disambiguation)
- Baren, Payzawat County or Barin, a town in Payzawat County, Kashgar Prefecture, China
- Barin Township, a township of Akto County, Kizilsu Kyrgyz Autonomous Prefecture, Xinjiang, China
- Barin Township, Kargilik County, a in Xinjiang
- Barin Township, Shule County, a in Xinjiang
- Deh Barin, a village in Fars Province, Iran
- Prince Barin, a character in the Flash Gordon stories

== See also ==
- Baarin, a village in northern Syria
- Baarins, a Southern Mongol subgroup
- Baren (disambiguation)
