= Sekino Yowsaku =

Japanese woodblock printmaker (born 1944)

- 関野洋作
- Sekino in 2026
- Born: 1944 (age 81–82); Suginami, Tokyo, Japan
- Education: Chuo University (1968)
- Known for: Colour woodblock prints with gold leaf
- Relatives: Sekino Jun'ichirō (father)
- Awards: Shun'yōkai Prize (1992); Oka Shikanosuke Prize (2004)

Sekino Yowsaku (Japanese: 関野洋作; also romanized Sekino Yōsaku or Yosaku; born 1944) is a Japanese printmaker who makes multi-block colour woodblock prints, many of them incorporating gold leaf. The second son of the printmaker Sekino Jun'ichirō, he worked for seventeen years as his father's technical assistant before establishing himself as an independent artist. He is a member of the Shun'yōkai art association, and his work is held by the Library of Congress, the Portland Art Museum, and the Lavenberg Collection of Japanese Prints at the University of Oregon.

== Early life and education ==
Sekino was born in 1944 in Suginami, Tokyo. In the early 1950s his father ran an etching study group from the family home, attended by artists including Yamaguchi Gen and Komai Tetsurō, and after dinner each evening lectured his sons on art and literature. Neither son initially intended to follow him; both studied science, and Sekino graduated from the Faculty of Science and Engineering at Chuo University in 1968. He then worked as a company employee for about three years before leaving, dissatisfied with that career.

== Assistant to Sekino Jun'ichirō ==
In 1971 Sekino became his father's technical assistant, a role he held for seventeen years until Jun'ichirō's death in 1988. His work included cleaning the key blocks, carving the colour blocks and printing, and it was during this period that he acquired his woodblock technique. According to the editor of Hanga Geijutsu, he did not take up the role with the aim of becoming an artist; he regarded his father as a genius and did not consider himself one. Portland Art Museum curator Jeannie Kenmotsu described the same path, noting that he began by assisting his father in the studio before becoming a printmaker in his own right.

In 2014 Sekino gave a talk on his father's woodblock technique and a gallery talk at the centenary retrospective of Jun'ichirō's work at the Machida City Museum of Graphic Arts.

== Career ==
Sekino began exhibiting with the Shun'yōkai in 1984. He received the association's Shun'yōkai Prize in 1992 and its Oka Shikanosuke Prize in 2004, and is a member of both the Shun'yōkai and the Japan Artists Association. He held solo exhibitions at the Nihonbashi Takashimaya art gallery in 2007 and 2016, and at Gallery Hakudohtei in Kyōbashi, Tokyo, in January 2012.

An impression of his print Black Peony (2004) was reproduced in the catalogue of the 50th CWAJ Print Show, organized by the College Women's Association of Japan in 2005. Sekino gave the print to the Library of Congress in 2006, and it was exhibited there in 2007. At the 60th CWAJ Print Show in 2015, Empress Michiko (now Empress Emerita) purchased his print Sakura.

His work has been shown in two-person exhibitions with his father's: at the Miura Museum of Art (Miurart Village) in Matsuyama in 2014, where he gave a public printing demonstration, and at the Chōfu City Cultural Hall Tazukuri in 2017, an exhibition organized by the city's cultural foundation and the Chōfu City Local Museum. His 1991 print Shitsugen (Wetlands) was included in Forces of Nature: Ecology in Japanese Prints at the Portland Art Museum in 2022, hung beside his father's Red Fuji.

In 2026 Hanga Geijutsu reported that inquiries and orders for his work from abroad had increased in recent years.

== Technique ==
Sekino prints in water-based pigments from multiple blocks. Unlike ukiyo-e, in which an outline key block separates the colours, his prints use no key block: all of the blocks, on average more than ten per print, are overprinted, so that the colours mix on the paper. Sekino, who trained in chemistry, has calculated that ten blocks can in theory yield 1,023 colour combinations. He also uses a wire-brush carving method adapted from etching, and varies baren pressure and the water content of his pigments to build depth.

Gold leaf became a defining feature of his work as he developed his own style. In his recent flower compositions, blossoms fill most of the picture surface; gold leaf is laid into the outlines and into the narrow areas of background left visible. Hanga Geijutsu describes this fine gold-leaf linework as a technique he developed through repeated trial and error. His subjects include temples, Tokyo cityscapes and landscapes as well as flowers, though flowers have predominated in recent years; he approaches prints as works of art that also decorate interiors.

Kenmotsu, who watched him carve a block, called the work intricate and said the physical labour involved was hard to appreciate from the finished print.

== Reception ==
Writing in Hanga Geijutsu in 2011, its editor-in-chief, Matsuyama, argued that the modern sōsaku hanga movement, by emphasizing the artist's personal expression, had lost much of the technical mastery of ukiyo-e, and that Sekino was arguably the printmaker in whom technique and expression were then most fully developed. He acknowledged that some viewers might find the work somewhat craft-like and classical in composition, lacking modern "expression", but argued that no woodblock print carved and printed by a single artist with comparable richness of colour had been seen in either ukiyo-e or sōsaku hanga.

In a 2026 profile in the same magazine, Kurimoto wrote that his gold-leaf technique allows him to convey both opulence and a solemn stillness, and attributed the appeal of the work to his single-minded pursuit of effects specific to the woodblock medium.

== Collections ==
- Library of Congress, Prints and Photographs Division – Black Peony (2004), gift of the artist, 2006
- Portland Art Museum – Shitsugen (Wetlands, 1991) and Akisame (Autumn Rain, 1992), Vivian and Gordon Gilkey Graphic Arts Collection, accessioned 2017

== Selected exhibitions ==
Solo

- 2007 – Nihonbashi Takashimaya Art Gallery, Tokyo
- 2012 – Gallery Hakudohtei, Kyōbashi, Tokyo
- 2016 – Nihonbashi Takashimaya Art Gallery, Tokyo

Two-person and group

- 2005 – 50th CWAJ Print Show, Tokyo American Club
- 2007 – Library of Congress, Washington, D.C.
- 2014 – Sekino Jun'ichirō and Yowsaku: Father–Son Print Exhibition, Miura Museum of Art, Matsuyama
- 2015 – 60th CWAJ Print Show, Tokyo
- 2017 – Sekino Jun'ichirō and Yowsaku: Father–Son Woodblock Print Exhibition, Chōfu City Cultural Hall Tazukuri
- 2022 – Forces of Nature: Ecology in Japanese Prints, Portland Art Museum
