= TV4 (Polish TV channel) =

Television channel in Poland

- Logo used since 2023
- Country: Poland

Programming
- Picture format: 1080i HDTV (downscaled to 16:9 576i for the SDTV feed)

Ownership
- Owner: Polskie Media (2000–2014); Telewizja Polsat (2014–present)
- Sister channels: TV6; Polsat; Polsat 2 Polsat Rodzina; Super Polsat

History
- Launched: 1 April 2000; 26 years ago
- Replaced: Nasza TV

Links
- Website: tv4.pl

Availability

Terrestrial
- Digital terrestrial television: Channel 6 (HD)

TV4 is a Polish free-to-air television channel originally owned by Polskie Media. It was founded through the merger of Nasza TV and Polsat 2 and started broadcasting on 1 April 2000. In August 2013, Polskie Media was acquired by Telewizja Polsat, and since 2014, Polsat became a direct broadcaster of TV4.

== History ==
TV4 was established on 1 April 2000 as a result of the merger of Nasza TV (1998–2000) and Polsat 2 in its initial format (1997–2000). From the beginning of TV4's existence until 2005, the TV Odra stations started relaying TV4, thus extending the network of transmitters. Each of the local stations had guaranteed daily slots to broadcast their own programs. With time, however – for financial reasons – subsequent TV stations resigned from broadcasting them (in practice, simply becoming transmitters of the TV4 signal). Each of the TV Odra stations – apart from their own local broadcast slots for several hours a day – still carried the channel, except for NTL Radomsko which has been rebroadcasting TVN since September 2005.

A Lithuanian version of TV4 existed between 2002 and 2004 using BTV's network.

TV4 mainly broadcasts movies and series as well as entertainment and cultural programs. From March 2007 to the first half of 2011, the program was broadcast around the clock. Later, TV4 started between 5.05 am and 6.40 am and ended between 2.00 am and 4.30 am. From August 2013, the station is again broadcasting 24 hours a day. On 1 March 2012, TV4 switched to the 16:9 aspect ratio with WSS signal. On 17 June 2013, TV4 ended analogue terrestrial broadcasting and from that day on, it is broadcast only digitally. On 1 January 2014, Telewizja Polsat became the owner of the station that so far was formally owned by the Polskie Media holding (which since 30 August 2013 was 100% owned by Telewizja Polsat).

On 1 October 2015, TV4 launched its HD feed along with three other channels (Polsat 2 HD, Polsat Play HD, Polsat Cafe HD).

On 30 March 2017, TV4 unveiled its last new graphics package, designed by SADAJ. The idents consists of a girl or a ballerina dancing around the screen. The logo remained unchanged.

Since 15 September 2020, the channel's signal is broadcast on the Internet on the ipla VOD website belonging to the broadcaster.

On 3 August 2023, TV4, along with TV6, were rebranded again with new logos and graphics derived from the main parent channel Polsat.

== Logo History ==
2000 - 2006	2006 - 2007	2007 - 2023	2023–present

== Major programmes ==
Title	Translation of the title	Based on	Type	Year(s) aired
Bar (series 6: Bar Europa)	Bar (Bar Europe)	The Bar	reality show	2005
Big Brother (series 4–5)	Big brother	Big Brother	reality show	2007–2008
Daję słowo	I give you a word	Páli vám to?	game show	2003–2006
Detektywi w akcji	Detectives in action	—	docu-crime	2015–2017
Eureko, ja to wiem! (series 4)	Eureko, I know it!	Achmea Kennisquiz	game show	2009
Galileo	—	Galileo	popular science	since 2007
Gwiazdy kabaretu	Cabaret stars	—	comedy	since 2018
Hole in the Wall	—	Hole in the Wall	game show	2009
Istne szaleństwo	Sheer madness	—	game show	2008
Kinomaniak	Cinema-goer	—	magazine	2002–2011
Kłamczuch / Gdzie jest kłamczuch?	Liar / Where is the liar?	Dirty Rotten Cheater	game show	2008–2009
Lingo (Note: In 1990s TVP2 aired a game show based on the same format (it was, however, entitled 5 × 5 – wygrajmy razem (5 × 5 – let's win together).)	Lingo	Lingo	game show	2007
Love Island. Wyspa miłości (series 7–)	"Wyspa miłości" = Love island	Love Island	reality dating show, bikini reality	since 2023
Mała czarna	Cafe noir	—	talk-show, lifestyle	2007–2013; then moved to Polsat Café
Muzyczne listy	Music letters	—	music videos compilation	c. 2000–2012
Policjantki i policjanci	Policewomen and policemen	—	docu-crime	since 2014
Sekrety sąsiadów (Note: In 2020 renamed as Nowe sekrety sąsiadów (The new neighbours’ secrets).)	Neighbours’ secrets	—	docu-soap	2014–2015, 2020
Spadkobiercy (Note: A separate continuation of a segment in a Polsat's comedy show. A televised version of a scenic comedy show.)	Inheritors	—	improvised comedy TV series	2008–2013, 2017
Sprawiedliwi – Wydział kryminalny	Fair-minded – criminal department	—	docu-crime	since 2016
STOP Drogówka (Note: A continuation of Drogówka.)	STOP Traffic police	—	hidden camera / documentary magazine	since 2010
Włatcy móch (Note: The original title is intentionally misspelled.)	Lordz o’ flys	—	animated sitcom (black comedy)	2006–2011
Włatcy móch: One	Lordz o’ flys: them girls	—	animated sitcom (black comedy)	2024

== See also ==
- TV6
