= Nasza TV =

Defunct Polish television channel

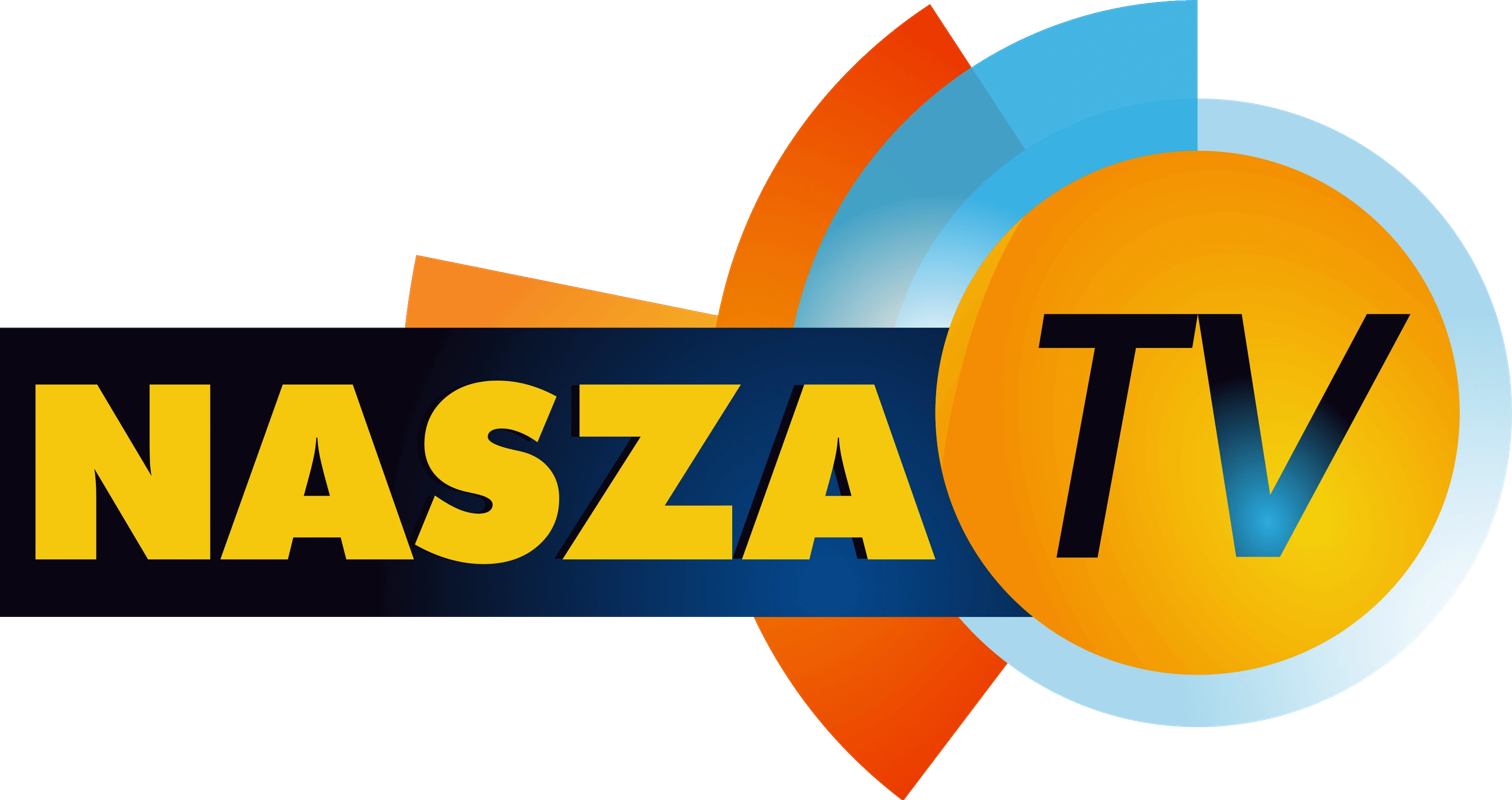
- Country: Poland
- Broadcast area: Poland
- Headquarters: Warsaw, Poland

Programming
- Language: Polish
- Picture format: 576i (4:3 SDTV)

History
- Launched: 17 January 1998; 28 years ago
- Closed: 31 March 2000; 26 years ago
- Replaced by: TV4

Nasza TV was a Polish supraregional television network, started operating on 17 January 1998, initially with 10 broadcasting stations in Poland, owned by Polskie Media S.A.. Within days of launching, TVN acquired 22% of the company's shares from ProCable, violating Polskie Media's charter.

In the terrestrial broadcasting and cable networks, it initially reached 47% of households. Thanks to the close cooperation with the satellite channel RTL 7, some programs were retransmitted here and were also available as a result throughout the country. On 3 June 1999 the TV signal appeared on the digital TV platform Wizja TV, on the network of PTK and later on Cyfrowy Polsat. Besides that, the station was launched via another terrestrial transmitters like TV Odra. On 31 March 2000, after the acquisition of Polskie Media S.A. by Polsat, the channel was replaced by TV4.
