= Bar (Czech TV series) =

Bar is the local Czech version of Nordic reality show The Bar. The show first aired between 9 July 2006 and 2 September 2006. It was broadcast on TV Prima, with Libor Bouček and Laďka Něrgešová presenting.

== Contestants ==
Name	Residence	Occupation	Age
Anife Ismet Hassan	Prague	Actress/dancer	30
Dagmar Červinková	Velká Bíteš	Shop manager	24
Drahomír Drobilič, "Drobek"	Hlohovec	Electrician	29
Martin Fiřt, "Flary"	Kadaň	Model, student	25
Jan Tlachač, "Honza"	Svoboda nad Úpou	Student	20
Jarka Bláhová	Přerov	Cosmetics	36
Luboš Kraus	Pardubice	Financial adviser	37
Marcela Baldas	Písek	Manager	32
Michaela Smíšková, "Míša"	Frýdek-Místek	Nurse	22
Pavel Novotný	Prague	Productor	25
Petra Matulová	Liberec	Lawyer	27
Roman Veselský, "Rocker"	Mikulov	Chef	42
Tomáš Savka	Karlovy Vary	Student	22

== Nominations ==
- Teams:
  - Red Team: Tomáš, Marcela, Luboš, Petra, Flary & Míša.
  - Yellow Team: Anife, Rocker, Dagmar, Drobek, Honza, Jarka & Pavel.
- Rules:
1. The person with the lowest score from each team is their candidate for nomination.
2. If more than one person in a team has the lowest score, then the person with the highest score must decide which will be up for nomination.
3. The public then decides which of the two candidates for nomination will be up for eviction.
4. The person with the highest score from the team the public chooses much choose the second person up for eviction.
5. Finally, the public votes on who they want to save out of the two nominees. The one with the fewest votes is evicted.

	Round 1	Round 2	Round 3	Round 4	Round 5	Round 6	Round 7	Round 8	Final	
Marcela	Míša; Luboš	Tomáš; Luboš	Flary; Luboš	Petra; Luboš	Petra; Luboš	Pavel; Luboš	Petra; Pavel	Petra; Drobek	Winner (Day 56)	
Petra	Míša; Flary	Míša; Luboš	Míša; Flary	Míša; Luboš	Marcela; Luboš	Marcela; Luboš	Marcela; Pavel	Marcela; Honza	Runner-Up (Day 56)	
Drobek	Not in The Bar	Jarka; Dagmar	Jarka; Dagmar	Honza; Pavel	Pavel; Dagmar	Honza; Pavel	Honza; Marcela	Honza; Marcela	Evicted (Day 53)	
Honza	Pavel; Dagmar	Jarka; Dagmar	Pavel; Jarka	Pavel; Dagmar	Pavel; Dagmar	Drobek; Flary	Drobek; Petra	Drobek; Marcela	Evicted (Day 53)	
Flary	Marcela; Luboš	Míša; Luboš	Míša; Luboš	Míša; Luboš	Marcela; Luboš	Marcela; Luboš	Drobek; Pavel	Evicted (Day 49)		
Pavel	Honza; Dagmar	Jarka; Dagmar	Honza; Jarka	Honza; Dobrek	Honza; Dagmar	Marcela; Flary	Marcela; Flary	Evicted (Day 49)		
Tomáš	Míša; Flary	Petra; Marcela	Míša; Flary	Flary; Míša	Petra; Marcela	Drobek; Flary	Evicted (Day 42)			
Luboš	Tomáš; Flary	Tomáš; Marcela	Míša; Flary	Flary; Míša	Flary; Petra	Honza; Marcela	Evicted (Day 42)			
Dagmar	Pavel; Jarka	Honza; Jarka	Honza; Jarka	Pavel; Honza	Pavel; Honz	Evicted (Day 35)				
Míša	Flary; Marcela	Petra; Luboš	Petra; Luboš	Petra; Tomáš	Evicted (Day 28)					
Jarka	Honza; Dagmar	Drobek; Dagmar	Drobek; Pavel	Evicted (Day 21)						
Rocker	Jarka; Dagmar	Jarka; Dagmar	Evicted (Day 14)							
Anife	Jarka; Dagmar	Evicted (Day 7)								
Highest Score	Míša (+3); Honza (+2)	Míša (+2); Jarka (+2)	Míša (+4); Honza (+2)	Míša (+3); Honza (+2)	Flary (+1); Marcela (+1); Petra (+1); Pavel (+3)	Honza (+2); Marcela (+2)	Drobek (+2)	Petra (+1)	None	
Lowest Score (Nominated)	Luboš (-2); Dagmar (-5)	Luboš (-4); Dagmar (-5)	Luboš (-3); Jarka (-2)	Luboš (-3); Dagmar (-5)	Luboš (-3); Dagmar (-3)	Flary (-3); Luboš (-2)	Pavel (-4); Flary (-1)	Honza (-1); Drobek (0); Marcela (0)	None	
1st Nominated (By Public Vote)	Dagmar; 77% to evict	Dagmar; 70.5% to evict	Jarka; 68% to evict	Luboš; 49.9% to evict	Dagmar; 51.1% to evict	Flary; 71.71% to evict	Flary; 57.42% to evict	None		
2nd Nominated (By Highest Score Team Member)	Anife	Rocker	Dagmar	Míša	Drobek	Tomáš	Marcela	None		
Evicted	Anife; 30% to save	Rocker; 30.5% to save	Jarka; 46% to save	Míša; 71% to save	Dagmar; 35% to save	Luboš; 28.29% to save	Pavel; 42.58% to save	Honza ??% to save	Petra; 22% to win	
Evicted	Anife; 30% to save	Rocker; 30.5% to save	Jarka; 46% to save	Míša; 71% to save	Dagmar; 35% to save	Luboš; 28.29% to save	Pavel; 42.58% to save	Honza ??% to save	Petra; 22% to win	Marcela; 78% to win
Evicted	Anife; 30% to save	Rocker; 30.5% to save	Jarka; 46% to save	Míša; 71% to save	Dagmar; 35% to save	Tomáš; 49.41% to save			Petra; 22% to win	Marcela; 78% to win
Evicted	Anife; 30% to save	Rocker; 30.5% to save	Jarka; 46% to save	Míša; 71% to save	Dagmar; 35% to save	Tomáš; 49.41% to save	Flary; 32% to save	Drobek; 37% to save	Petra; 22% to win	Marcela; 78% to win
