= Baras (TV series) =

Lithuanian reality television series

Baras is the local season of the reality The Bar in Lithuania. The show was aired from 2003 to 2005 with three seasons in total. LNK is the channel was aired.

== Season 1 ==
- Start Date: 7 June 2003
- End Date: 31 August 2003
- Duration: 85 days
- Contestants:
  - The Finalists: Laimis (The Winner) & Jurgita (Runner-up).
  - Evicted Contestants: Apolonas, Aušra, Donatas, Ieva, Ilma, Jolita, Kęstutis, Lauryna, Robertas & Rolandas.
  - Other Contestants (exit type unknown): Agnieszka, Dainius, Darius & Kristina.

=== Contestants ===
Contestant	Residence	Occupation	Age
Agnieszka Dobrovolska	Warsaw, Poland		24
Apolonas Semelevičius	Šiauliai	Businessman	33
Aušra	Kaunas	Store Consultant	24
Dainius Surgelas		Bartender	27
Darius Kulpis	Šiauliai		34
Donatas	Kaunas	Student	19
Ieva Kaminskaitė	Vilnius	Music Student	23
Ilma		English Teacher	27
Jolita Seredaitė	Vilnius		24
Jurgita Krivickienė			21
Kęstutis	Vilnius	Bartender	28
Kristina Paliulionytė	Šiauliai		21
Laimis Bartasūnas	Vilnius		23
Lauryna			29
Robertas Janovskis	Vilnius		25
Rolandas Banys	Jurbarkas		30

== Season 2 ==
- Start Date: 11 October 2004
- End Date: 31 December 2004
- Duration: 82 days
- Contestants:
  - The Finalists: Andrius (The winner) & Skaistė (Runner-up).
  - Evicted Contestants: Daiva, Darius, Eglė, Gabija, Ieva, Lina, Mikas, Mindaugas, Pripsas, Rolandas, Skaiva, Stella, Vilija & Vytas.

=== Contestants ===
Contestant	Residence	Occupation	Age
Andrius Surblys	Plungė/Kaunas	Unemployed	22
Daiva	Kaunas	Unemployed	21
Darius	Marijampolė	Unemployed	27
Eglė		Law Student	23
Gabija Norkienė	Klaipėda	Makeup Artist	28
Ieva	Vilnius	Business Management Student	19
Linute, "Lina"	Palanga	Quota Clerk	24
Mikas Širvinskas	Vilnius	Bartender	30
Mindaugas Valaitis	Kudirkos Naumiestis	Farmer	23
Pripsas			36
Rolandas Masiulis	Klaipėda		22
Skaistė Būtytė	Klaipėda	Casino Barmaid	23
Skaiva Jasevičiūtė	Klaipėda	Journalist	22
Stella	Vilnius	Business Management Student	24
Vilija Stankiuvienė	Vilnius	Former Model	42
Vytas	Vilnius	Advertising Manager	26

== Season 3 (All-Stars) ==
- Start Date: 16 April 2005
- End Date: 27 May 2005
- Duration: 42 days.
- The Prize: 100,000 litas
- Contestants:
  - The Finalists: Skaistė (The winner) & Dainius (Runner-up).
  - Evicted Contestants: Agnieška, Andrius, Arnoldas, Daiva, Gintas, Ieva, Laimis, Linutė, Mindaugas, Ona & Rolandas.

=== Contestants ===
Contestant	Residence	Season Participated	Age
Agnieška Dobrovolska		Baras 1	26
Andrius Surblys	Plungė/Kaunas	Baras 2	23
Arnoldas			31
Dainius Surgelas		Baras 1	29
Daiva	Kaunas	Baras 2	22
Gintas			39
Ieva Kaminskaitė		Baras 1	25
Laimis Bartasūnas	Vilnius	Baras 1	25
Linutė, "Lina"		Baras 2	25
Mindaugas Valaitis	Kudirkos Naumiestis	Baras 2	24
Ona Mackonyte	Vilnius		22
Rolandas Banys	Jurbarkas	Baras 1	32
Skaistė Būtytė	Klaipėda	Baras 2	24

=== Nominations ===
	Round 1	Round 2	Round 3	Round 4	Round 5	Round 6	Round 7	Round 8	Round 9	Round 10	Round 11	Final	
Skaistė	Nominated	Andrius; Laimis	?? Rolandas	?? ??	?? ??	?? ??	?? Ona	?? ??	?? ??	?? ??	Dainius; Agnieška	Winner (Day 42)	
Dainius	Nominated	Rolandas; Mindaugas	Agnieška ??	?? ??	Rolandas ??	?? ??	?? Ona	?? ??	?? ??	?? ??	Agnieška; Skaistė	Runner-Up (Day 42)	
Agnieška	Nominated	Rolandas; Mindaugas	?? ??	?? ??	?? Gintas	?? ??	?? Ona	?? ??	?? ??	?? ??	Dainius; Skaistė	Evicted (Day 41)	
Gintas	Not in The Bar			?? ??	?? ??	?? ??	?? Ona	?? ??	?? ??	?? ??	Evicted (Day 38)		
Andrius	Nominated	Linutė; Laimis	?? ??	?? ??	?? ??	?? ??	?? Ona	?? ??	?? ??	Evicted (Day 34)			
Rolandas	Nominated	Skaistė; Laimis	Agnieška ??	?? ??	?? ??	?? ??	?? ??	?? ??	Evicted (Day 31)				
Ona	Not in The Bar					?? ??	?? ??	Evicted (Day 27)					
Daiva	Nominated	Dainius; Linutė	?? Rolandas	?? ??	?? ??	?? ??	Evicted (Day 24)						
Arnoldas	Not in The Bar		Agnieška ??	?? ??	Rolandas; Gintas	Evicted (Day 20)							
Mindaugas	Nominated	Skaistė; Laimis	?? Rolandas	?? ??	Evicted (Day 16)								
Linutė	Nominated	Andrius; Dainius	?? Rolandas	Evicted (Day 13)									
Laimis	Nominated	Rolandas; Mindaugas	Evicted (Day 9)										
Ieva	Nominated	Rolandas; Mindaugas	Evicted (Day 6)										
Plus (+)	None	Rolandas (4 votes)	Agnieška (3 votes)	?? (? votes)	Rolandas (2 votes)	?? (? votes)	?? (? votes)	?? (? votes)	?? (? votes)	?? (? votes)	Dainius (2 votes)	None	
Minus (-) (1st Nominated)	None	Mindaugas (4 votes)	Rolandas (4 votes)	?? (? votes)	Gintas (2 votes)	?? (? votes)	Ona (5 votes)	?? (? votes)	?? (? votes)	?? (? votes)	Skaistė (2 votes)	None	
2nd Nominated (By Plus (+))	None	Laimis	Linutė	??	Arnoldas	??	Gintas	??	??	??	Agnieška	None	
Evicted	Ieva ??% to evict	Laimis; 52.49% to evict	Linutė; 64.47% to evict	Mindaugas; 54.92% to evict	Arnoldas; 55.84% to evict	Daiva; 52.93% to evict	Ona; 70.9% to evict	Rolandas; 56.27% to evict	Andrius; 51.88% to evict	Gintas; 60.61% to evict	Agnieška; 66.67% to evict		
Evicted	Ieva ??% to evict	Laimis; 52.49% to evict	Linutė; 64.47% to evict	Mindaugas; 54.92% to evict	Arnoldas; 55.84% to evict	Daiva; 52.93% to evict	Ona; 70.9% to evict	Rolandas; 56.27% to evict	Andrius; 51.88% to evict	Gintas; 60.61% to evict	Agnieška; 66.67% to evict	Dainius; 49.11% to win	Skaistė; 50.89% to win
