= El Bar TV =

Television series

El Bar TV is the Argentine version of the reality show The Bar. The show had two seasons. It was shown on América TV. The host was Andy Kusnetzoff.

== Season 1 ==
- Start Date: 18 March 2001
- End Date: 2 June 2001
- Duration: 77 days
- Contestants:
  - The Finalists: Federico (The Winner) & Eduardo (Runner-up)
  - Evicted Contestants: Alejandra, Celeste, César, Daniel, Estrella, Juan Pablo, Julieta, Maximiliano, Mónica & Yael.

=== Contestants ===
Contestant	Residence	Occupation	Age
Alejandra Pujalte	Mendoza	Lawyer	30
Celeste Montanari		Student	23
César Nogueiras		DJ & leader of a rap band	23
Daniel Granelli		Musician & singer	29
Eduardo Nocera		Representative of rock musicians	38
Estrella Millman			34
Federico Blanco		Student	21
Juan Pablo Valencia		Bartender & Student	23
Julieta Domínguez	La Plata	Sells second hand clothes	28
Maximiliano Panigatti		Handles consortiums	22
Mónica Ruíz		Barman	26
Yael Glancszpiegel		Assistant of a counsel	21

== Nominations ==
	Round 1	Round 2	Round 3	Round 4	Round 5	Round 6	Round 7	Round 8	Round 9	Round 10	Round 11	Final	
Federico	Celeste; Estrella	Daniel; Mónica	Yael; Juan Pablo	Maximiliano; Eduardo	Yael; César	Daniel; Julieta	Yael; Eduardo	Yael; Mónica	Daniel; Mónica	Daniel; Eduardo	Nominated	Winner (Day 77)	
Eduardo	Julieta; Estrella	Julieta; Daniel	Julieta; Mónica	César; Celeste	Julieta; Yael	Daniel; Julieta	Yael; Federico	Evicted (Day 48)	Maximiliano; Federico	Federico; Daniel	Inmune	Runner-Up (Day 77)	
Daniel	Celeste; Estrella	Yael; Mónica	Federico; Juan Pablo	Federico; Eduardo	Yael; César	Federico; Julieta	Yael; Eduardo	Mónica; Maximiliano	Mónica; Maximiliano	Federico; Eduardo	Nominated	Evicted (Day 75)	
Mónica	Daniel; Estrella	Eduardo; Daniel	Daniel; Yael	César; Celeste	Yael; César	Daniel; Julieta	Yael; Eduardo	Maximiliano; Yael	Daniel; Federico	Federico; Eduardo	Evicted (Day 69)		
Maximiliano	Eduardo; Daniel	Eduardo; Celeste	César; Juan Pablo	César; Celeste	Julieta; Daniel	Daniel; Julieta	Eduardo; Daniel	Mónica; Yael	Federico; Mónica	Evicted (Day 62)			
Yael	Celeste; Daniel	Alejandra; Mónica	Federico; Federico	Federico; Eduardo	Daniel; César	Daniel; Julieta	Daniel; Eduardo	Federico; Mónica	Evicted (Day 55)				
Julieta	Eduardo; Estrella	Eduardo; Daniel	Eduardo; Juan Pablo	César; Celeste	César; Yael	Daniel; Eduardo	Evicted (Day 41)						
César	Yael; Alejandra	Eduardo; Daniel	Eduardo; Yael	Mónica; Celeste	Julieta; Yael	Evicted (Day 34)							
Celeste	Estrella; Maximiliano	Yael; Mónica	Federico; Juan Pablo	Federico; Eduardo	Evicted (Day 27)								
Juan Pablo	Eduardo; Estrella	Eduardo; Daniel	Eduardo; Yael	Evicted (Day 20)									
Alejandra	Celeste; Daniel	Yael; Mónica	Evicted (Day 13)										
Estrella	Celeste; Yael	Evicted (Day 6)											
Plus (+)	Celeste (5 votes)	Eduardo (5 votes)	Eduardo (3 votes)	César (4 votes)	Julieta (3 votes)	Daniel (6 votes)	Yael (4 votes)	Mónica (2 votes)	Daniel (2 votes)	Federico (3 votes)	None		
Minus (-) (1st Nominated)	Estrella (6 votes)	Daniel (5 votes)	Juan Pablo (5 votes)	Celeste (5 votes)	César (4 votes)	Julieta (6 votes)	Eduardo (4 votes)	Yael (3 votes)	Federico (2 votes)	Eduardo (3 votes)	None		
2nd Nominated (By Plus (+))	Maximiliano	Alejandra	Yael	Daniel	Mónica	Maximiliano	Federico	Federico	Maximiliano	Mónica	None		
Evicted	Estrella; 79% to evict	Alejandra; 66% to evict	Juan Pablo; 61% to evict	Celeste; 55% to evict	César; 77% to evict	Julieta; 91% to evict	Eduardo; 51% to evict	Yael; 62% to evict	Maximiliano; 55% to evict	Mónica; 57% to evict	Daniel; 52% to evict	Eduardo; 46% to win	
Evicted	Estrella; 79% to evict	Alejandra; 66% to evict	Juan Pablo; 61% to evict	Celeste; 55% to evict	César; 77% to evict	Julieta; 91% to evict	Eduardo; 51% to evict	Yael; 62% to evict	Maximiliano; 55% to evict	Mónica; 57% to evict	Daniel; 52% to evict	Eduardo; 46% to win	Federico; 54% to win

== Season 2 ==
- Start Date: 8 October 2001
- End Date: 26 December 2001
- Duration: 80 days
- Contestants:
  - The Finalists: Diego (The Winner) & Tamir (Runner-up)
  - Evicted Contestants: Cecilia, Christian, Eugenia, Franco, Guillermina, Luciano, Marcelo, Mónica, Pamela, Sabrina & Viviana
  - Voluntary Exit: Nicolás

=== Contestants ===
Contestant	Residence	Occupation	Age
Cecilia Rovarino	La Plata	Journalist	23
Christian Mercatante	Mataderos, Buenos Aires	Butcher	26
Diego Plotino	Mar del Plata	Model & singer	26
Eugenia Schnaiderman	Villa Urquiza, Buenos Aires	Medical visitor	26
Franco Meneghello	Buenos Aires	Whisky importer	34
Guillermina Garcia-Rudi	Sáenz Peña, Buenos Aires	Employee	22
Luciano Vilas	Vicente López, Buenos Aires	Student	25
Marcelo Luchetti	Mataderos, Buenos Aires	Sewage worker	28
Mónica Santa-Cruz	Posadas, Misiones	Student	21
Nicolás Calderone	San Martín, Buenos Aires	Student	21
Pamela David	Santiago del Estero	Model	23
Tamir Gerstein Lotan	Palermo, Buenos Aires	Waiter	26
Viviana Arce	San Isidro, Buenos Aires	Psychologist	28
Sabrina Pillado Salas	Palermo, Buenos Aires	Singer	21

=== Nominations ===
	Round 1	Round 2	Round 3	Round 4	Round 5	Round 6	Round 7	Round 8	Round 9	Round 10	Round 11	Round 12	Final	
Diego	Viviana; Luciano	Viviana; Marcelo	Christian; Eugenia	Guillermina; Eugenia	Luciano; Marcelo	Pamela; Viviana	Viviana; Sabrina	Viviana; Tamir	Pamela; Nicolás	Christian; Tamir	Christian; Luciano	Christian; Pamela	Winner (Day 81)	
Tamir	Franco; Mónica	Luciano; Mónica	Nicolás; Eugenia	Diego; Nicolás	Franco; Marcelo	Guillermina; Franco	Viviana; Franco	Pamela; Franco	Pamela; Nicolás	Christian; Diego	Luciano; Pamela	Diego; Pamela	Runner-Up (Day 81)	
Christian	Luciano; Eugenia	Luciano; Mónica	Diego; Eugenia	Evicted (Day 20)					Pamela; Tamir	Tamir; Viviana	Pamela; Diego	Pamela; Diego	Re-Evicted (Day 80)	
Pamela	Christian; Mónica	Franco; Mónica	Eugenia; Tamir	Tamir; Eugenia	Luciano; Franco	Diego; Nicolás	Viviana; Franco	Luciano; Franco	Luciano; Sabrina	Tamir; Christian	Christian; Diego	Christian; Diego	Evicted (Day 76)	
Luciano	Pamela; Mónica	Franco; Mónica	Tamir; Eugenia	Tamir; Eugenia	Franco; Sabrina	Nicolás; Viviana	Pamela; Viviana	Pamela; Nicolás	Pamela; Sabrina	Christian; Diego	Christian; Diego	Evicted (Day 74)		
Viviana	Diego; Sabrina	Pamela; Marcelo	Eugenia; Tamir	Guillermina; Eugenia	Pamela; Luciano	Diego; Guillermina	Diego; Sabrina	Pamela; Franco	Diego; Sabrina	Diego; Tamir	Evicted (Day 69)			
Nicolás	Eugenia; Viviana	Franco; Mónica	Tamir; Christian	Tamir; Eugenia	Franco; Pamela	Luciano; Guillermina	Luciano; Viviana	Diego; Luciano	Sabrina; Diego	Walked (Day 65)				
Sabrina	Tamir; Viviana	Franco; Viviana	Eugenia; Guillermina	Nicolás; Tamir	Franco; Luciano	Nicolás; Guillermina	Luciano; Viviana	Evicted (Day 48)	Nicolás; Viviana	Re-Evicted (Day 62)				
Franco	Nicolás; Cecilia	Marcelo; Viviana	Eugenia; Nicolás	Diego; Tamir	Sabrina; Pamela	Sabrina; Tamir	Luciano; Viviana	Luciano; Tamir	Evicted (Day 55)					
Guillermina	Nicolás; Mónica	Viviana; Mónica	Eugenia; Nicolás	Diego; Nicolás	Franco; Sabrina	Franco; Sabrina	Evicted (Day 41)							
Marcelo	Cecilia; Mónica	Franco; Viviana	Nicolás; Tamir	Nicolás; Diego	Franco; Pamela	Evicted (Day 34)								
Eugenia	Nicolás; Viviana	Franco; Viviana	Guillermina; Diego	Tamir; Diego	Evicted (Day 27)									
Christian	Luciano; Eugenia	Luciano; Mónica	Diego; Eugenia	Evicted (Day 20)										
Mónica	Franco; Pamela	Sabrina; Luciano	Evicted (Day 13)											
Cecilia	Marcelo; Mónica	Evicted (Day 6)												
Walked	None								Nicolás	None				
Team Inmune (Public Vote)	None	Green; 53.6%	Orange; 54.6%	Orange; 51.2%	Green; 51.6%	None								
Plus (+)	Nicolás (3 votes)	Franco (6 votes)	Eugenia (5 votes)	Tamir (4 votes)	Franco (6 votes)	Diego (2 votes)	Luciano (4 votes)	Pamela (3 votes)	Pamela (4 votes)	Christian (3 votes)	Christian (3 votes)	Christian (2 votes)	None	
Minus (-) (1st Nominated)	Mónica (6 votes)	Mónica (6 votes)	Eugenia (5 votes)	Eugenia (5 votes)	Pamela (3 votes)	Guillermina (3 votes)	Viviana (4 votes)	Franco (3 votes)	Sabrina (3 votes)	Tamir (4 votes)	Diego (3 votes)	Pamela (2 votes)	None	
2nd Nominated (By Plus (+))	Cecilia	Viviana	Christian	Nicolás	Marcelo	Tamir	Sabrina	Nicolás	Diego	Viviana	Luciano	Tamir	None	
Evicted	Cecilia; 51% to evict	Mónica; 54% to evict	Christian; 52.1% to evict	Eugenia; 56.4% to evict	Marcelo; 52.8% to evict	Guillermina; 57.6% to evict	Sabrina; 56.9% to evict	Franco; 60.9% to evict	Sabrina; 66.9% to evict	Viviana; 50.1% to evict	Luciano; 72.4% to evict	Pamela; 69.9% to evict	Christian; 23.6% to save	Tamir; 38.9% to won
Evicted	Cecilia; 51% to evict	Mónica; 54% to evict	Christian; 52.1% to evict	Eugenia; 56.4% to evict	Marcelo; 52.8% to evict	Guillermina; 57.6% to evict	Sabrina; 56.9% to evict	Franco; 60.9% to evict	Sabrina; 66.9% to evict	Viviana; 50.1% to evict	Luciano; 72.4% to evict	Pamela; 69.9% to evict	Christian; 23.6% to save	Diego; 61.1% to won

== Ratings ==
Neither the first and neither the second season of the programme had much success, but the show was the most watched in América TV during 2001.
