= Barin, Iran =

Barin (Persian: برين) in Iran may refer to:

- Barin, Golestan
- Barin, Zanjan

== See also ==
- Barin (disambiguation)
