= Baari =

Finnish reality television series

Baari is the local series of the reality series The Bar in Finland. The show was started on 7 March 2006 and finished on 4 June 2006, with a duration of 90 days. The series was aired on Sub TV. The presenters are Kirsi Salo and Silvia Modig.

== Contestants ==
Contestant	Residence	Occupation	Age
Daniel	Vantaa		21
Frank Tammin	Järvenpää		22
Hanna	Helsinki		24
Irena	Helsinki		31
Kaj	Turku		31
Katarina	Hyvinkää		27
Makkonen	Sotkamo		29
Mira	Helsinki		32
Mirita	Helsinki		23
Olivia Kortelainen	Helsinki		29
Petri	Helsinki		38
Tiina	Kuopio		25
Tomas	Porvoo		26

== Nominations ==
	Round 1	Round 2	Round 3	Round 4	Round 5	Round 6	Round 7	Round 8	Round 9	Round 10	Final	
Frank	Kaj; Mira	Petri; Tiina	Hanna; Katarina	Makkonen; Tiina	Kaj; Makkonen	Kaj; Makkonen	Irena; Olivia	Hanna; Olivia	Irena; Hanna	Mira; Irena	Winner (Day 90)	
Mira	Mirita; Makkonen	Kaj; Daniel	Makkonen; Daniel	Hanna; Frank	Olivia; Tiina	Tiina; Hanna	Immune	Olivia; Kaj	Irena; Hanna	Irena; Frank	Runner-up (Day 90)	
Irena	Petri; Makkonen	Mira; Daniel	Petri; Katarina	Makkonen; Daniel	Petri; Frank	Tiina; Hanna	Tiina; Olivia	Mira; Hanna	Mira; Hanna	Frank; Mira	Evicted (Day 83)	
Hanna	Kaj; Petri	Tiina; Mirita	Mira; Katarina	Tomas; Daniel	Kaj; Frank	Kaj; Makkonen	Immune	Frank; Mira	Mira; Irena	Evicted (Day 76)		
Kaj	Mirita; Mira	Petri; Mirita	Frank; Katarina	Makkonen; Irena	Hanna; Tiina	Hanna; Makkonen	Immune	Frank; Mira	Walked (Day 65)			
Olivia	Not in The Bar				Mira; Irene	Kaj; Makkonen	Irena; Frank	Kaj; Mira	Evicted (Day 62)			
Tiina	Kaj; Daniel	Hanna; Makkonen	Irena; Katarina	Tomas; Daniel	Petri; Frank	Irena; Hanna	Irena; Olivia	Evicted (Day 55)				
Tomas	Kaj; Mira	Makkonen; Mirita	Irena; Katarina	Makkonen; Daniel	Petri; Frank	Tiina; Hanna	Walked (Day 52)					
Makkonen	Daniel; Mira	Petri; Mirita	Irena; Katarina	Tomas; Daniel	Petri; Frank	Tiina; Hanna	Evicted (Day 48)					
Petri	Tomas; Mira	Makkonen; Mirita	Irena; Katarina	Makkonen; Daniel	Makkonen; Frank	Evicted (Day 41)						
Daniel	Kaj; Mira	Makkonen; Mirita	Frank; Tiina	Tiina; Mira	Evicted (Day 27)							
Katarina	Frank; Petri	Kaj; Daniel	Irena; Frank	Evicted (Day 20)								
Mirita	Tiina; Petri	Petri; Hanna	Evicted (Day 13)									
Public nomination (Vote Plus)	None						Frank (25.88%)	Frank (25.4%)	Mira (28.7%)	None		
Walked	None						Tomas	None	Kaj	None		
Highest score	Kaj (+5)	Petri (+4)	Irena (+5)	Makkonen (+5)	Petri (+4)	Kaj (+4)	Irena (+3)	Frank (+3)	Mira (+3)	Mira (+2)	None	
Lowest score (1st nominated)	Mira (-6)	Mirita (-6)	Katarina (-8)	Daniel (-6)	Frank (-6)	Makkonen (-5)	Olivia (-3)	Mira (-2)	Hanna (-3)	Frank (-3)	None	
2nd nominated (By highest score)	None	Katarina	Frank	Kaj	Petri	Mira	Tiina	Olivia	Irena	Irena	None	
Evicted	Eviction cancelled	Mirita; 51.43% to evict	Katarina; 61% to evict	Daniel; 52% to evict	Petri; 80% to evict	Makkonen; 51% to evict	Tiina; 51% to evict	Olivia; 80% to evict	Hanna; 65% to evict	Irena; 54% to evict		
Evicted	Eviction cancelled	Mirita; 51.43% to evict	Katarina; 61% to evict	Daniel; 52% to evict	Petri; 80% to evict	Makkonen; 51% to evict	Tiina; 51% to evict	Olivia; 80% to evict	Hanna; 65% to evict	Irena; 54% to evict	Mira ??% to win	Frank ??% to win
