= Bár (Hungarian TV series) =

Hungarian reality television series

Bár is a Hungarian version of The Bar. The show was aired on Viasat 3 in 2001 (season 1) and 2008 (season 2).

== Season 1 ==
- Start Date: 12 May 2001
- End Date: 21 July 2001
- Duration: 71 days.
- Presenter: Péter Novák
- Contestants:
  - The Finalists: Tiger (The Winner) & Tibi (Runner-up).
  - Evicted Contestants: Attila, Edina, Erika, Évi, Laura, Napsugár, Tommi, Zoli & Zsanzi.

=== Contestants ===
Contestant	Residence	Occupation	Age
Attila			
Edina			
Erika			
Évi			
Laura			
Napsugár			
Tibi			
Tiger			
Tommi			
Zoli			
Zsanzi			

== Season 2 ==
- Name: Bár 2.0
- Start Date: 15 September 2008
- End Date: 26 October 2008
- Duration: 42 days.
- Presenters: Péter Majoros & Lia Kustánczi
- Contestants:
  - The Finalists: Duda (The Winner), Évi (Runner-up), Tomi (3rd) & Zsófi (4th).
  - Evicted Contestants: Ági, Baba, Escobar, Péter, Ricsi & Vivi.
  - Ejected Contestants: Iván.

=== Contestants ===
Contestant	Residence	Occupation	Age
Ágnes Szalontai, "Ági"	Budapest		27
Éva Guba, "Baba"	Senta, Serbia		24
Dániel Izer Zoltán, "Duda"	Keszthely		26
Ádám Balogh Tamás, "Escobar"	Budapest		26
Éva Baukó, "Évi"	Szeged		23
Iván Jakab	Budapest		31
Péter Molnár	Kaposvár		28
Richárd Kovács, "Ricsi"	Gyál	PR Manager	25
Tamás Czinege, "Tomi"	Balassagyarmat		28
Vivien Cservenkai, "Vivi"	Budapest	Marketing Assistant	23
Zsófia Zöld, "Zsófi"	Budapest	Topless Model	21

== Nominations ==
	Round 1	Round 2	Round 3	Round 4	Final	
Duda	Vivi	??	??	??	Winner (Day 42)	
Évi	Iván	??	??	??	Runner-Up (Day 42)	
Tomi	Escobar	??	??	??	3rd Place (Day 42)	
Zsófi	Iván	??	??	??	4th Place (Day 42)	
Baba	Vivi	??	??	??	Evicted (Day 35)	
Escobar	Iván	??	??	??	Evicted (Day 35)	
Péter	Ági	??	??	Evicted (Day 28)		
Ricsi	Vivi	??	??	Evicted (Day 28)		
Ági	Vivi	??	Evicted (Day 21)			
Iván	Vivi	Ejected (Day 18)				
Vivi	Duda	Evicted (Day 14)				
Immunity (By Group)	None	Duda	Escobar	Évi	None	
1st Nominated (By Group)	Vivi (5 votes)	?? (? votes)	?? (? votes)	?? (? votes)	None	
2nd Nominated (By 1st Nominated)	Duda	??	??	??	None	
Final Nominated	Vivi; Duda	Ági; Escobar	Évi; Péter; Ricsi	Baba; Escobar; Tommi	None	
Evicted	Vivi; 34% to save	Ági; 47% to save	Ricsi; 21% to save	Escobar; 21% to save	Zsófi; 18% to win	Tommi; 23% to win
Evicted	Vivi; 34% to save	Ági; 47% to save	Péter; 35% to save	Baba; 35% to save	Évi; 27% to win	Duda; 32% to win
