= Hole in the Wall (Polish game show) =

Polish game show

- Show's logo
- Starring: Adam Grzanka; Adam Małczyk; Michał Pałubski
- Theme music composer: Simon Darlow
- Country of origin: Poland
- Original language: Polish
- No. of seasons: 1
- No. of episodes: 12

Production
- Running time: 65 minutes

Original release
- Network: TV4
- Release: 7 March – 30 May 2009

Hole in the Wall is the Polish version of the British comedy show, which has the same name, which in turn is based on the Japanese game show Brain Wall (popularly also known as Human Tetris). It started airing the show in 2009 on TV4. It is hosted by three people from the cabaret group Formacja Chatelet - Adam Grzanka, Adam Małczyk and Michał Pałubski. The biggest prizes on the show are 3,000 zloty (about $910 or €680) and 6,000 zloty (about $1820 or €1360). Hole in the Wall is shown on every Saturday at 10 PM (UTC+1)

== Rules ==
Rules, appearance and sounds are roughly the same as in the UK version, but with a small change. There are other types of walls (which are borrowed from the US version). The show has a red team and a blue team, who wear silver metallic suits with helmets and knee pads of their team colors.

=== Types of walls ===
- Solo ściana (Solo wall) - one contestant versus one wall, nominated by the captain. The captain can also nominate himself. If successful - 10 points.
- Dwuściana (Double Wall) - two contestants versus one wall. The two players cannot involve the one player who previously did the solo wall. If successful - 10 points.
- 3ściana (Triple Wall) - three contestants versus one wall. If successful - 10 points.
- Ściana kapitańska (The captain wall) - Captains of both teams versus one wall. They must get through it with identical items . If successful - 10 points for each side.
- Ściana lustrzana (Mirror wall)- one contestant standing backwards versus one wall. One contestant helps him by using only sign language. If successful - 10 points.
- Dwuściana lustrzana (Double Mirror Wall) - two contestants standing backwards versus one wall. One contestant helps them by using only sign language. If successful - 10 points.
- Niespościanka (Surprise-wall) - one contestant with one thing versus one wall. If done - 10 points.
- Ścianozagadka (Mystery-wall) - two contestants versus one wall. On the wall there is a mystery to solve (usually a complicated algebra problem). There are two answers on the wall. To not fall into the water, the contestants have to punch the correct answer. If they choose the correct answer - 20 points.
- Dwuściana kapitańska (Double Captain Wall) - two contestants versus one wall. One of the contestants is a captain of a team. If successful - 10 points.
- Ostatnia ściana ratunku (The last wall of rescue) - one, two or three contestants versus one wall. If successful - 10 points multiplied by number of contestants. If the contestants won't make it, the points are subtracted.
- Ściana rozpaczy (The wall of distress) - entire team versus one wall. The team facing this wall is decided by the captain of team with the most points. If any one of the contestants doesn't clear the wall, the opposing team wins. If successful - 3,000 zloty. If the other team wins by default, they also win 3,000 złotych.
- Ślepa ściana (Blind wall) - one contestant wears glasses designed to work as a blindfold, in which you can't see anything versus one wall. Two contestants help him, and the audience isn't allowed to speak. If done - 6,000 zloty. If not done, no money, but no money is awarded to the other team.

A team's maximum possible win is 9,000 zloty.

== Number of viewers ==
Episode	Date of broadcast	Number of viewers
1	7 March 2009	420 974
2	14 March 2009	283 628
3	21 March 2009	238 275
4	28 March 2009	242 910
5 (celebrity edition)	4 April 2009	339 170
6	11 April 2009	
7	18 April 2009	
8	25 April 2009	
9	9 May 2009	
10	16 May 2009	
11	23 May 2009	
12	30 May 2009	
