= Eureko, ja to wiem! =

- Show's logo
- Starring: Ewa Gawryluk (season 1); Agata Młynarska (seasons 2–4)
- Country of origin: Poland
- Original language: Polish
- No. of seasons: 4
- No. of episodes: 68

Production
- Running time: 45 minutes

Original release
- Network: Polsat (seasons 1-3); TV4 (season 4)
- Release: 23 October 2005 – 21 June 2009

Eureko, ja to wiem! (Eureko, I know it!) is a Polish game show, where players are 6th graders. One of them, after 17 episodes, wins 500,000 zlotys (about €120,000 or $145,000). The first edition of the show was hosted by Ewa Gawryluk, then she was replaced with Agata Młynarska. The show debuted on 23 October 2005 on Polsat and it stopped broadcasting in 2008, but one next season started on 26 February 2009 on TV4.

New episodes were shown on: Sunday evenings (first season), Saturday afternoons (second season), Saturday mornings (third season) and Thursday evenings (fourth season).
