= Bar 5 (TV Poland) =

Bar Vip is the fifth local season of the reality The Bar in Poland.

== Synopsis ==
- Start Date: 11 September 2004
- End Date: 18 December 2004
- Duration: 99 days
- Contestants:
  - The Finalists: Ewelina (The Winner) & Bartek L (Runner-up)
  - Evicted Contestants: Agata M, Agnieszka, Anna R, Anna We, Anna Wo, Bartek M, Iwona, Jacek, Jarek, Kamil, Karolina, Łukasz, Maciek, Marta, Michał, Monika T, Monika W, Piotr, Sebastian & Żaneta
  - Voluntary Exits: Agata T, Bartosz, Irek, Kasia, Róża, Witold & Wojtek

=== Contestants ===
Anonymous
Contestant	Residence	Occupation	Age
Agata Mata	Warsaw		19
Agnieszka Rogulska	Włocławek		22
Anna Rudzińska	Zabrze		29
Anna Wencławek	Biesiekierz		19
Anna Wojciechowska	Żuromin		23
Bartłomiej Latawski, "Bartek L"	Warsaw		26
Bartłomiej Morawski, "Bartek M"	Warsaw		37
Ewelina Ciura	Zabrze		20
Jarek Mikulski	Knurów		34
Kamil Bulonis	Warsaw		20
Karolina Kuik	Ostrów Wielkopolski		23
Łukasz Starosta	Biedrusko		23
Maciek Kubica	Warsaw		36
Marta Dziubałka	Zielona Góra		23
Michał Płonka	Warsaw		24
Monika Tomkiel	Szczecin		23
Monika Wincza	Lubin		19
Róża Małodobra	Wrocław		21
Witold Osasiuk	Gdańsk		28
Żaneta Dylong	Dobrodzień		20
Celebrity
Contestant	Residence	Famous for...	Age
Agata Torzewska	Brussels, Belgium	Daughter of singer Marek Torzewski	20
Bartosz Wrona	Poznań	Singer	22
Ireneusz Mleczko, "Irek"	Wrocław	Choreographer	27
Iwona Węgrowska	Żory	Singer	22
Jacek Korwin-Mikke	Warsaw	Journalist	27
Katarzyna Dziewiątkowska-Mleczko, "Kasia"	Wrocław	Classical Musician	20
Piotr Cugowski	Lublin	Musician & Brother of Wojtek	26
Sebastian Riedel	Tychy	Singer	26
Wojtek Cugowski	Lublin	Musician, Singer, Guitarist & Brother of Piotr	28

=== Nominations ===
	Round 1	Round 2	Round 3	Round 4	Round 5	Round 6	Round 7	Round 8	Round 9	Round 10	Round 11	Round 12	Round 13	Round 14	Final	
Ewelina	-	-	-	-	-	-	-	-	-	-	-	-	-	-	Winner (Day 99)	
Bartek L	-	-	-	-	-	-	-	-	-	-	-	-	-	-	Runner-Up (Day 99)	
Marta	-	-	-	-	-	-	-	-	-	-	-	-	-	-	Evicted (Day 98)	
Kamil	-	-	-	-	-	-	-	-	-	-	-	-	-	-	Evicted (Day 97)	
Agata M	-	-	-	-	-	-	-	-	-	-	-	-	-	-	Evicted (Day 96)	
Anna Wo	-	-	-	-	-	-	-	-	-	-	-	-	-	-	Evicted (Day 96)	
Karolina	-	-	-	-	-	-	-	-	-	-	-	-	-	-	Evicted (Day 96)	
Monika W	-	-	-	-	-	-	-	-	-	-	-	-	-	-	Evicted (Day 96)	
Łukasz	-	-	-	-	-	-	-	-	-	-	-	-	-	-	Evicted (Day 92)	
Sebastian	-	-	-	-	-	-	-	-	-	-	-	-	-	-	Evicted (Day 85)	
Bartosz	-	-	-	-	-	-	-	-	-	-	-	-	-	-	Walked (Day 80)	
Michał	-	-	-	-	-	-	-	-	-	-	-	-	-	-	Evicted (Day 78)	
Maciek	-	-	-	-	-	-	-	-	-	-	-	-	-	-	Evicted (Day 71)	
Jarek	-	-	-	-	-	-	-	-	-	-	-	-	-	-	Evicted (Day 71)	
Agnieszka	-	-	-	-	-	-	-	-	-	-	-	-	-	-	Evicted (Day 64)	
Jacek	-	-	-	-	-	-	-	-	-	-	-	-	-	-	Evicted (Day 57)	
Irek	-	-	-	-	-	-	-	-	-	-	-	-	-	-	Walked (Day 52)	
Kasia	-	-	-	-	-	-	-	-	-	-	-	-	-	-	Walked (Day 52)	
Wojtek	-	-	-	-	-	-	-	-	-	-	-	-	-	-	Walked (Day 52)	
Piotr	-	-	-	-	-	-	-	-	-	-	-	-	-	-	Evicted (Day 50)	
Anna R	-	-	-	-	-	-	-	-	-	-	-	-	-	-	Evicted (Day 43)	
Anna We	-	-	-	-	-	-	-	-	-	-	-	-	-	-	Evicted (Day 36)	
Róża	-	-	-	-	-	-	-	-	-	-	-	-	-	-	Walked (Day 30)	
Witold	-	-	-	-	-	-	-	-	-	-	-	-	-	-	Walked (Day 30)	
Iwona	-	-	-	-	-	-	-	-	-	-	-	-	-	-	Evicted (Day 29)	
Agata T	-	-	-	-	-	-	-	-	-	-	-	-	-	-	Walked (Day 24)	
Bartek M	-	-	-	-	-	-	-	-	-	-	-	-	-	-	Evicted (Day 22)	
Monika T	-	-	-	-	-	-	-	-	-	-	-	-	-	-	Evicted (Day 15)	
Żaneta	-	-	-	-	-	-	-	-	-	-	-	-	-	-	Evicted (Day 8)	
Highest Score	-	-	-	-	-	-	-	-	-	-	-	-	-	-	None	
Lowest Score (1st Nominated)	-	-	-	-	-	-	-	-	-	-	-	-	-	-	None	
2nd Nominated (By Highest Score)	-	-	-	-	-	-	-	-	-	-	-	-	-	-	None	
Evicted	- ??% to evict	- ??% to evict	- ??% to evict	- ??% to evict	- ??% to evict	- ??% to evict	- ??% to evict	- ??% to evict	- ??% to evict	- ??% to evict	- ??% to evict	- ??% to evict	- ??% to evict	- ??% to evict		
Evicted	- ??% to evict	- ??% to evict	- ??% to evict	- ??% to evict	- ??% to evict	- ??% to evict	- ??% to evict	- ??% to evict	- ??% to evict	- ??% to evict	- ??% to evict	- ??% to evict	- ??% to evict	- ??% to evict	- ??% to win	- ??% to win
