= Baren (Swedish TV series) =

Swedish reality television series

Baren (known as Baren Pop up) is the sixth season of the reality The Bar in Sweden. Presenter of the show is Paolo Roberto.

== Season 6 ==
- Name: Baren Pop-Up
- Start Date: 14 April 2015
- End Date: 3 May 2015
- Duration: 21 days
- TV: TV12

=== Contestants ===
Contestant	Residence	Contestant in Reality Show	Age	Result
Ellinor Bjurström	Åkersberga	Top Model Sverige 7	20	Winner
Fredrik Jonsson	Stockholm	Sveriges Mästerkock 5	29	Runner-up
Jessica Bäckman	Norrköping	Sveriges Värsta Bilförare 6	26	Runner-up
Gurkan Gasi	Västerås	Sveriges Värsta Bilförare 2, Robinson 2010, Big Brother 5 & Kändishoppet 2	30	Evicted 6th
Sandra Ankarstrand	Södertälje	Farmen 7	25	Evicted 5th
André Holgård	Karlstad	Farmen 7 & Farmen 8	26	Evicted 4th
Aina Lesse	Stockholm	Paradise Hotel 5	23	Evicted 3rd
Felicia Moberg	Stockholm	Big Brother 3 Scandinavia		Evicted 2nd
Rodney Da Silva	Oslo, Norway	Bg Brother 5 & Bg Brother 6	27	Evicted 1st

=== Nominations ===
	Week 1	Week 2	Week 3	Week 4	Week 5	Week 6	Week 7	Week 8	Week 9	Week 10	Final	
Ellinor	-	-	-	-	-	-	-	-	-	-		
Fredrik	-	-	-	-	-	-	-	-	-	-		
Jessica	-	-	-	-	-	-	-	-	-	-		
Gurkan	-	-	-	-	-	-	-	-	-	-		
Sandra	-	-	-	-	-	-	-	-	-	-		
André	-	-	-	-	-	-	-	-	-	-		
Aina	-	-	-	-	-	-	-	-	-	-		
Felicia	Not in The Bar	-	-	-	-	-	-	-	-	-		
Rodney	-	Evicted (Day ?)										
Notes	1	2	-	-	-	-	-	-	-	-	None	
Highest Score	None	André (+5)	-	-	-	-	-	-	-	-	None	
Lowest Score (1st Nominated)	None	Jessica (-5)	-	-	-	-	-	-	-	-	None	
2nd Nominated (By Highest Score)	None	-	-	-	-	-	-	-	-	-	None	
Evicted	Rodney by Team A	- ??% to evict	- ??% to evict	- ??% to evict	- ??% to evict	- ??% to evict	- ??% to evict	- ??% to evict	- ??% to evict	- ??% to evict		
Evicted	Rodney by Team A	- ??% to evict	- ??% to evict	- ??% to evict	- ??% to evict	- ??% to evict	- ??% to evict	- ??% to evict	- ??% to evict	- ??% to evict	- ??% to win	- ??% to win

The contestants on Team A.
The contestants on Team B.

Notes

- ^Note 1 : The contestants were divided into 2 teams: A (Aina, André, Fredrik & Gurkan) & B (Ellinor, Jessica, Rodney & Sandra). The Team A won more money in the Bar, and they had to evict someone from Team B.
- ^Note 2 : Felicia as a new contestant is Immune she had to divide the contestants in 2 new teams: A (André, Ellinor, Felicia & Gurkan) & B (Aina, Fredrik, Jessica & Sandra). A team won again and yesterday the first +/- was held. Only the members from the A team could be voted as + and members from B team as -
