= El bar provoca =

Mexican television series

El Bar Provoca is a reality show following events in a bar, or nightclub. The show followed thirteen contestants, who were watched for twenty-four hours, while they lived in El Depa (The Apartment). It was hosted through the first month by Roberto Palazuelos as El Patrón (The Boss). It was later hosted by Roxana Castellanos as La Patrona (The Patroness). Other hosts included Karla Gómez and Elías Chiprut (The Access Bar) and Lorena Herrera as La Dama de la Noche (The Lady of the Night). The show has since ended.

== Season 1 ==
The first and only season of El Bar Provoca premiered on August 2, 2006. Through the first month, Roberto Palazuelos was the main host of the show. After this month, the main host was changed due to conflicts inside Televisa. The new hosts were Roxana Castellanos and Lorena Herrera.

=== Los Socios ===
Los Socios (The Partners) is a group of two people in charge of judging the participants according to their work done. They included Mario Beteta and Jorge Mondragón. The main partner was Enrique Rocha, an actor who entered the show after the change of hosts.

=== Los Consejeros ===
Los Consejeros (The Counselors) were a group of four people that provided opinions to help El Patrón to make choices about many different events during the show. They consisted of Erich Zinser, Eduardo Cesarmann, Jorge Ramos and Simón Charaf.

=== Contestants ===
Name	Residence	Occupation	Age
Alexis Madero	Monterrey		26
Juan José Arizaleta	Edomex		28
Azucena Sánchez	Acapulco		22
Ibelis Llanez	La Habana		26
Vanessa Kobi "La Britni"	México D.F.		21
Mayra García "La Coyota"	México D.F.		27
Mariana Martínez	Tuxtla Gutiérrez		29
Nicolás del Campo "Nico"	México D.F.		39
José Luis Hernández García "Piter Punk"	Playa del Carmen		19
Luis Préstamo	Monterrey		30
Anabella Barrera "Tita"	Cancún		24
Ulises Ramírez	México D.F.		37
Jorge Villegas	México D.F.		27

=== Nominations ===
	Round 1	Round 2	Round 3	Round 4	Round 5	Round 6	Final	
Piter Punk	Azucena	La Coyota	No; Nominate	No; Nominate	No; Nominate	No; Nominate	Winner (Day 85)	
Villegas	Ibelis	La Coyota	No; Nominate	Nominated	No; Nominate	Nominated	Runner-Up (Day 85)	
La Britni	Ibelis	Piter Punk	Nominated	No; Nominate	No; Nominate	Nominated	3rd Place (Day 85)	
Arizaleta	Azucena	La Coyota	No; Nominate	No; Nominate	No; Nominate	No; Nominate	th Place (Day 85)	
Azucena	Ibelis	Piter Punk	No; Nominate	No; Nominate	No; Nominate	No; Nominate	th Place (Day 85)	
La Coyota	Ibelis	Piter Punk	No; Nominate	Nominated	Nominated	No; Nominate	th Place (Day 85)	
Nico	Azucena	La Coyota	No; Nominate	No; Nominate	No; Nominate	Nominated	Evicted (Day 71)	
Alexis	La Coyota	La Coyota	No; Nominate	No; Nominate	Nominated	Evicted (Day 64)		
Préstamo	Azucena	La Coyota	Nominated	Nominated	Evicted (Day 50)			
Ulises	Azucena	La Coyota	Nominated	Evicted (Day 33)				
Ibelis	Azucena	La Coyota	Evicted (Day 43)					
Mariana	Azucena	La Coyota	Walked (Day 36)					
Tita	Ibelis	Evicted (Day 15)						
Walked	None		Mariana	None				
1st Nominated (By Customers)	Arizaleta	Ulises	Ulises	Préstamo	Alexis	None		
2nd Nominated (by Bar Manager)	Tita	La Britni	Préstamo	Villegas	None			
2nd Nominated (by 1st Nominated)	None				La Coyota	None		
3rd Nominated (by Contestants)	Azucena (7 votes)	La Coyota (9 votes)	None					
3rd Nominated (by 1st & 2nd Nominated)	None		La Britni	La Coyota	None			
Evicted	Tita; 19.83% to save	Eviction; Cancelled	Ibelis (by Bar Manager)	Préstamo ??% to save	Alexis ??% to save	Nico ??% to save	? ??% (out of 6)	? ??% (out of 6)
Evicted	Tita; 19.83% to save	Eviction; Cancelled	Ibelis (by Bar Manager)	Préstamo ??% to save	Alexis ??% to save	Nico ??% to save	? ??% (out of 6)	La Britni ??% (out of 3)
Evicted	Tita; 19.83% to save	Eviction; Cancelled	Ulises ??% to save	Préstamo ??% to save	Alexis ??% to save	Nico ??% to save	Villegas ??% (out of 3)	Piter Punk ??% (out of 3)
