= Bar 4 (TV Poland) =

Bar Złoto dla Zuchwałych is the fourth local season of the reality The Bar in Poland.

== Synopsis ==
- Start Date: 28 February 2004.
- End Date: 12 June 2004.
- Duration: 106 days.
- Translation: Złoto dla zuchwałych means Gold for sly and relates to the prize of 6 kg of pure gold.
- Contestants:
  - The Finalists: Mirka (The Winner) & Arek* (Runner-up).
  - Evicted Contestants: Adrian, Agnieszka F, Agnieszka K, Aldek, Ania, Anna, Beata, Bernadetta, Damian, Dobroslawa, Eliza, Eric, Fatima, Iwona, Iza, Joanna, Karol*, Karolina, Klaudiusz, Magda M, Magda W, Maja, Marta, Mounir, Oleg, Piotr G, Piotr T, Ramona, Robert, Sebastian, Sylwia R, Sylwia W & Wiola.
  - Voluntary Exits: Dorota & Leszek.

* Karol was evicted twice. Arek was previously evicted.

- Format: Bar 4 contained 2 teams of contestants, a team from the general public and a team of Reality All Stars who had appeared in previous editions of Bar or Big Brother.

=== Contestants ===
Anonymous
Contestant	Residence	Occupation	Age
Adrian Tomala	Gliwice		29
Ania Przędzak	Lwówek Śląski		28
Anna Filipska			30
Beata Bernacka	Szczecin		29
Bernadetta Przybylska	Nowa Dęba		26
Eliza Chojnacka	Barlinek		29
Fatima Wojcieszenko	Gdańsk		20
Iza Grodecka	Ciechanów		24
Joanna Michalik, "Asia"	Tarnowskie Góry		27
Karol Krukowski	Bartoszyce		24
Magdalena Witkowska	Sosnowiec		23
Maja Kotarska	Pruszków		21
Mirosława Eichler, "Mirka"	Nowa Wieś		21
Mounir Hassine	Inowrocław		34
Oleg Astakhov	Lutsk, Ukraine		21
Piotr Targowski	Skarżysko Kamienna		26
Ramona Snarska	Mikołajki		24
Robert Kornalewicz	Zielona Góra		22
Sebastian Starosta	Bedoń		24
Sylwia Ruman			31
Sylwia Witosław			40
Wioleta Uliasz, "Wiola"	Warsaw		21
Reality All-Stars
Contestant	Residence	Reality Show	Age
Agnieszka Frykowska	Łódź	Big Brother 3 & Bar 3	27
Agnieszka Koziołek	Wrocław	Big Brother 3	27
Aldek Margol	Ziębice	Bar 3	35
Arkadiusz Nowakowski, "Arek"	Gorzów Wielkopolski	Big Brother 2	31
Damian Das Zegarski	San Francisco, United States	Bar 3	38
Dobrosława Zych-Henner	Wrocław	Bar 2	27
Dorota Rabczewska	Ciechanów	Bar 2	20
Eric Alira	Chocianów	Bar 2	33
Iwona Fijałkowska	Gdańsk	Bar 3	28
Karolina Jakubik	Gdańsk	Big Brother 2	23
Klaudiusz Sevkovic	Chorzów	Big Brother 1	33
Leszek Fedorowicz	Warsaw	Bar 3	48
Magdalena Modra	Poznań	Bar 3	24
Marta Bodziachowska	Częstochowa	Bar 2	23
Piotr Gulczyński	Poznań	Big Brother 1	38

=== Nominations ===
	Round 1	Round 2	Round 3	Round 4	Round 5	Round 6	Round 7	Round 8	Round 9	Round 10	Round 11	Round 12	Round 13	Round 14	Round 15	Final	
Mirka	-	-	-	-	-	-	-	-	-	-	-	-	-	-	-	Winner (Day 106)	
Arek	-	-	-	-	-	-	-	-	-	-	-	-	-	-	-	Runner-Up (Day 106)	
Piotr G	-	-	-	-	-	-	-	-	-	-	-	-	-	-	-	Evicted (Day 105)	
Ramona	-	-	-	-	-	-	-	-	-	-	-	-	-	-	-	Evicted (Day 104)	
Magda M	-	-	-	-	-	-	-	-	-	-	-	-	-	-	-	Evicted (Day 103)	
Klaudiusz	-	-	-	-	-	-	-	-	-	-	-	-	-	-	-	Evicted (Day 99)	
Piotr T	-	-	-	-	-	-	-	-	-	-	-	-	-	-	-	Evicted (Day 92)	
Anna	-	-	-	-	-	-	-	-	-	-	-	-	-	-	-	Evicted (Day 87)	
Sylwia R	-	-	-	-	-	-	-	-	-	-	-	-	-	-	-	Evicted (Day 87)	
Sylwia W	-	-	-	-	-	-	-	-	-	-	-	-	-	-	-	Evicted (Day 87)	
Oleg	-	-	-	-	-	-	-	-	-	-	-	-	-	-	-	Evicted (Day 85)	
Dorota	-	-	-	-	-	-	-	-	-	-	-	-	-	-	-	Walked (Day 78)	
Robert	-	-	-	-	-	-	-	-	-	-	-	-	-	-	-	Evicted (Day 78)	
Sebastian	-	-	-	-	-	-	-	-	-	-	-	-	-	-	-	Evicted (Day 77)	
Leszek	-	-	-	-	-	-	-	-	-	-	-	-	-	-	-	Walked (Day 71)	
Agnieszka F	-	-	-	-	-	-	-	-	-	-	-	-	-	-	-	Evicted (Day 71)	
Ania	-	-	-	-	-	-	-	-	-	-	-	-	-	-	-	Evicted (Day 70)	
Aldek	-	-	-	-	-	-	-	-	-	-	-	-	-	-	-	Evicted (Day 64)	
Damian	-	-	-	-	-	-	-	-	-	-	-	-	-	-	-	Evicted (Day 63)	
Eliza	-	-	-	-	-	-	-	-	-	-	-	-	-	-	-	Evicted (Day 61)	
Beata	-	-	-	-	-	-	-	-	-	-	-	-	-	-	-	Evicted (Day 61)	
Wiola	-	-	-	-	-	-	-	-	-	-	-	-	-	-	-	Evicted (Day 57)	
Karol	-	-	-	-	-	-	-	-	-	-	-	-	-	-	-	Evicted (Day 50)	
Iwona	-	-	-	-	-	-	-	-	-	-	-	-	-	-	-	Evicted (Day 49)	
Magda W	-	-	-	-	-	-	-	-	-	-	-	-	-	-	-	Evicted (Day 43)	
Karolina	-	-	-	-	-	-	-	-	-	-	-	-	-	-	-	Evicted (Day 42)	
Mounir	-	-	-	-	-	-	-	-	-	-	-	-	-	-	-	Evicted (Day 36)	
Marta	-	-	-	-	-	-	-	-	-	-	-	-	-	-	-	Evicted (Day 35)	
Adrián	-	-	-	-	-	-	-	-	-	-	-	-	-	-	-	Evicted (Day 29)	
Agnieszka K	-	-	-	-	-	-	-	-	-	-	-	-	-	-	-	Evicted (Day 28)	
Iza	-	-	-	-	-	-	-	-	-	-	-	-	-	-	-	Evicted (Day 22)	
Dobroslawa	-	-	-	-	-	-	-	-	-	-	-	-	-	-	-	Evicted (Day 21)	
Maja	-	-	-	-	-	-	-	-	-	-	-	-	-	-	-	Evicted (Day 15)	
Eric	-	-	-	-	-	-	-	-	-	-	-	-	-	-	-	Evicted (Day 14)	
Bernadetta	-	-	-	-	-	-	-	-	-	-	-	-	-	-	-	Evicted (Day 8)	
Highest Score	-	-	-	-	-	-	-	-	-	-	-	-	-	-	-	None	
Lowest Score (1st Nominated)	-	-	-	-	-	-	-	-	-	-	-	-	-	-	-	None	
2nd Nominated (By Highest Score)	-	-	-	-	-	-	-	-	-	-	-	-	-	-	-	None	
Evicted	- ??% to evict	- ??% to evict	- ??% to evict	- ??% to evict	- ??% to evict	- ??% to evict	- ??% to evict	- ??% to evict	- ??% to evict	- ??% to evict	- ??% to evict	- ??% to evict	- ??% to evict	- ??% to evict	- ??% to evict		
Evicted	- ??% to evict	- ??% to evict	- ??% to evict	- ??% to evict	- ??% to evict	- ??% to evict	- ??% to evict	- ??% to evict	- ??% to evict	- ??% to evict	- ??% to evict	- ??% to evict	- ??% to evict	- ??% to evict	- ??% to evict	- ??% to win	- ??% to win
