= Bar 3 (TV Poland) =

Bar Bez Granic is the third local season of the reality The Bar in Poland.

== Synopsis ==
- Start Date: 13 September 2003.
- End Date: 20 December 2003.
- Duration: 99 days.
- Contestants:
  - The Finalists: Maciej (The Winner) & Damian (Runner-up).
  - Evicted Contestants: Agnieszka F, Agnieszka T, Aldek, Amanda, Edyta, Iwona F, Iwona S, Julia, Krzysztof K, Krzysztof Z, Leszek, Magda D, Magda S, Marco, Paweł, Rafał, Tadeusz, Ting Ting, Weronika.
  - Voluntary Exits: Iwona G & Magda M.
  - Ejected Contestants: Adrian.

=== Contestants ===
Anonymous
Contestant	Residence	Occupation	Age
Agnieszka Tomala	Częstochowa		22
Aldek Margol	Ziębice		34
Amanda Gibas	Kuków		20
Damian Das Zegarski	San Francisco, United States		37
Edyta Robocień	Bełchatów		28
Iwona Fijałkowska	Gdańsk		27
Iwona Guzowska	Gdynia		29
Iwona Szalkowska			
Julia Somińska			
Krzysztof Kusik	Leszno		19
Krzysztof Zaręba	Łętownia		28
Leszek Fedorowicz	Warsaw		47
Maciej Kiślewski	Ostróda		24
Magda Dudek	Bieruń, Katowice		22
Magda Modra	Poznań		23
Magda Sieminski	Wrocław		24
Marco Mesina			
Paweł Naruszewicz	Suwałki		21
Rafał Majewski	Warsaw		25
Tadeusz Płatek			
Ting-Ting Liu	Poznań		19
Weronika Owusu			21
Reality All-Stars
Contestant	Residence	Reality Show	Age
Adrian Rafalski	Wrocław	Bar 2	26
Agnieszka Frykowska	Łódź	Big Brother 3	26

=== Nominations ===
	Round 1	Round 2	Round 3	Round 4	Round 5	Round 6	Round 7	Round 8	Round 9	Round 10	Round 11	Round 12	Round 13	Round 14	Round 15	Final	
Maciej	-	-	-	-	-	-	-	-	-	-	-	-	-	-	-	Winner (Day 99)	
Damian	-	-	-	-	-	-	-	-	-	-	-	-	-	-	-	Runner-Up (Day 99)	
Magda D	-	-	-	-	-	-	-	-	-	-	-	-	-	-	-	Evicted (Day 98)	
Agnieszka F	-	-	-	-	-	-	-	-	-	-	-	-	-	-	-	Evicted (Day 96)	
Aldek	-	-	-	-	-	-	-	-	-	-	-	-	-	-	-	Evicted (Day 92)	
Julia	-	-	-	-	-	-	-	-	-	-	-	-	-	-	-	Evicted (Day 90)	
Magda S	-	-	-	-	-	-	-	-	-	-	-	-	-	-	-	Evicted (Day 85)	
Magda M	-	-	-	-	-	-	-	-	-	-	-	-	-	-	-	Walked (Day 82)	
Leszek	-	-	-	-	-	-	-	-	-	-	-	-	-	-	-	Evicted (Day 78)	
Iwona S	-	-	-	-	-	-	-	-	-	-	-	-	-	-	-	Evicted (Day 71)	
Weronika	-	-	-	-	-	-	-	-	-	-	-	-	-	-	-	Evicted (Day 64)	
Agnieszka T	-	-	-	-	-	-	-	-	-	-	-	-	-	-	-	Evicted (Day 57)	
Marco	-	-	-	-	-	-	-	-	-	-	-	-	-	-	-	Evicted (Day 53)	
Iwona G	-	-	-	-	-	-	-	-	-	-	-	-	-	-	-	Walked (Day 50)	
Tadeusz	-	-	-	-	-	-	-	-	-	-	-	-	-	-	-	Evicted (Day 50)	
Edyta	-	-	-	-	-	-	-	-	-	-	-	-	-	-	-	Evicted (Day 50)	
Ting Ting	-	-	-	-	-	-	-	-	-	-	-	-	-	-	-	Evicted (Day 43)	
Krzysztof K	-	-	-	-	-	-	-	-	-	-	-	-	-	-	-	Evicted (Day 36)	
Paweł	-	-	-	-	-	-	-	-	-	-	-	-	-	-	-	Evicted (Day 29)	
Amanda	-	-	-	-	-	-	-	-	-	-	-	-	-	-	-	Evicted (Day 22)	
Adrian	-	-	-	-	-	-	-	-	-	-	-	-	-	-	-	Ejected (Day 22)	
Iwona F	-	-	-	-	-	-	-	-	-	-	-	-	-	-	-	Evicted (Day 15)	
Rafał	-	-	-	-	-	-	-	-	-	-	-	-	-	-	-	Evicted (Day 11)	
Krzysztof Z	-	-	-	-	-	-	-	-	-	-	-	-	-	-	-	Evicted (Day 8)	
Highest Score	-	-	-	-	-	-	-	-	-	-	-	-	-	-	-	None	
Lowest Score (1st Nominated)	-	-	-	-	-	-	-	-	-	-	-	-	-	-	-	None	
2nd Nominated (By Highest Score)	-	-	-	-	-	-	-	-	-	-	-	-	-	-	-	None	
Evicted	- ??% to evict	- ??% to evict	- ??% to evict	- ??% to evict	- ??% to evict	- ??% to evict	- ??% to evict	- ??% to evict	- ??% to evict	- ??% to evict	- ??% to evict	- ??% to evict	- ??% to evict	- ??% to evict	- ??% to evict		
Evicted	- ??% to evict	- ??% to evict	- ??% to evict	- ??% to evict	- ??% to evict	- ??% to evict	- ??% to evict	- ??% to evict	- ??% to evict	- ??% to evict	- ??% to evict	- ??% to evict	- ??% to evict	- ??% to evict	- ??% to evict	- ??% to win	- ??% to win
