= Deh Barin =

Deh Barin ده برين
- Village
- Location within Iran
- Coordinates: 29°24′37″N 54°45′00″E
- Country: Iran
- Province: Fars
- County: Neyriz
- Bakhsh: Qatruyeh
- Rural District: Qatruyeh

Population (2006)
  - Total: 96
- Time zone: UTC+3:30 (IRST)
  - Summer (DST): UTC+4:30 (IRDT)

Deh Barin (Persian: ده برين, also Romanized as Deh Barīn and Dehbarīn) is a village in Qatruyeh Rural District, Qatruyeh District, Neyriz County, Fars province, Iran. At the 2006 census, its population was 96, in 24 families.
