= Baren (Norwegian TV series) =

Norwegian television series

Baren is a Norwegian television series. The show was broadcast in 2000 and 2001 over two series on the Norwegian channel TV3.

== Season 1 ==
- Start date: 29 September 2000
- End date: 8 December 2000
- Duration: 71 days
- Prize: 250,000 Krone
- Contestants:
  - The finalists: Jamila (winner) and Tobias (runner-up)
  - Evicted contestants: Adina, Chris, Christoffer, Elena, Henrik, Liv Maren, Sandra, Steinar and Vegard

=== Contestants ===
Contestant	Residence	Age
Adina Jablinski	Oslo	22
Chris Backman	Stavanger	35
Christoffer Becker	Oslo	28
Elena Rivas Fuentes	Oslo	43
Henrik Jahren Haaland	Lillehammer	21
Jamila Brodin	Trondheim	23
Liv Maren Bjørnstad	Oslo	24
Sandra Janzso	Eidsvoll	20
Steinar Jensen	Bergen	25
Tobias Gannestad	Aurskog	20
Vegard Jacobsen	Haugesund	21

== Season 2 ==
- Start date: 29 January 2001
- End date: 27 April 2001
- Duration: 89 days
- Prize: 750,000 Krone
- Contestants:
  - The finalists: Bjørn (winner) and Dan (runner-up)
  - Evicted contestants: Cathrin, Charlotte, Eyvinn, Frode, Frøydis, Henriette, Hilde C, June, Merita, Per-Erik, Stian, Tom-Erik and Tone-Marie
  - Other contestants (exit type unknown): Alf, Helge, Hilde R, Kristin and Linda

=== Contestants ===
Contestant	Residence	Age
Alf Dukene	Risør	34
Bjørn Sjulstok	Løvenstad	26
Cathrin Konstanse Hauan	Oslo	22
Charlotte Faaberg	Bergen	27
Dan Riber	Ski	23
Eyvinn Helgevold	Stavanger	20
Frode Skrindsrud	Fagernes	28
Frøydis Benestad Hågvar	Oslo	22
Helge Skinderviken	Oslo	32
Henriette Borchgrevink	Kongsberg	23
Hilde Christoffersen	Oslo	31
Hilde Rietig	Asker	31
June Roszkowski		24
Kristin Selmer		34
Linda Burns	Oslo	22
Merita Jasnori		21
Per-Erik Nilsen	Trondheim	23
Stian Salter	Oslo/London	24
Tom-Erik Sværen	Oslo	28
Tone-Marie Trollbu	Fjellhamar	20

=== Nominations ===
	Round 1	Round 2	Round 3	Round 4	Round 5	Round 6	Round 7	Round 8	Round 9	Round 10	Round 11	Round 12	Round 13	Round 14	Final	
Bjørn	Immune	Frøydis; Helge	Immune	Alf; Kristin	Immune	Immune	Immune	Frode; Alf	Immune	Frøydis; June	?? ??	Dan; Frode	Frøydis; Tom-Erik	?? ??	Winner (Day 89)	
Dan	Henriette; Hilde C	Immune	Cathrin; Stian	Immune	?? ??	Tom-Erik; Charlotte	Tom-Erik; Stian	Frode; Kristin	Immune	June; Bjørn	?? ??	Tom-Erik; Frode	Frøydis; Bjørn	?? ??	Runner-Up (Day 89)	
Frøydis	Immune	Linda; Hilde R	Immune	Bjørn; Frode	Immune	Immune	Immune	Frode; Alf	June; Merita	Frode; June	?? ??	Frode; Dan	Bjørn; Tom-Erik	?? ??	Evicted (Day 88)	
Tom-Erik	Cathrin; Hilde C	Immune	Eyvinn; Hilde C	Immune	?? ??	Stian; Charlotte	Stian; Eyvinn	Frode; Merita	Immune	Eyvinn; June	?? ??	Dan; Frode	Frøydis; Bjørn	Evicted (Day 86)		
Hilde R	Immune	Linda; Helge	Immune	Walked (Day ??)								Dan; Frøydis	Re-Walked (Day ??)			
Frode	Not in The Bar		Immune	Alf; Tone-Marie	Immune	Immune	Immune	Frøydis; Alf	Immune	Tom-Erik; June	?? ??	Frøydis; Dan	Evicted (Day 82)			
Eyvinn	Charlotte; Hilde C	Immune	Cathrin; Hilde C	Immune	?? ??	Tom-Erik; Charlotte	Dan; Stian	Bjørn; Merita	Immune	Tom-Erik; June	?? ??	Evicted (Day 76)				
June	Not in The Bar								Frøydis; Merita	Dan; Bjørn	Evicted (Day 68)					
Merita	Not in The Bar							Bjørn; Alf	June; Frøydis	Evicted (Day 61)						
Kristin	Not in The Bar			Frode; Bjørn	Immune	Immune	Immune	Bjørn; Alf	Walked (Day ??)							
Alf	Immune	Frøydis; Helge	Immune	Frøydis; Tone-Marie	Immune	Immune	Immune	Frøydis; Kristin	Walked (Day ??)							
Linda	Immune	Tone-Marie; Helge	Immune	Frøydis; Alf	Immune	Immune	Immune	Walked (Day ??)								
Stian	Tom-Erik; Hilde C	Immune	Eyvinn; Hilde C	Immune	?? ??	Tom-Erik; Charlotte	Tom-Erik; Eyvinn	Evicted (Day 47)								
Charlotte	Henriette; Hilde C	Immune	Eyvinn; Stian	Immune	?? ??	Dan; Stian	Evicted (Day 40)									
Cathrin	Tom-Erik; Stian	Immune	Eyvinn; Hilde C	Immune	?? ??	Evicted (Day 33)										
Tone-Marie	Immune	Linda; Helge	Immune	Frøydis; Alf	Evicted (Day 26)											
Hilde C	Tom-Erik; Stian	Immune	Dan; Stian	Evicted (Day 19)												
Per-Erik	Immune	Alf; Hilde R	Evicted (Day 12)													
Helge	Immune	Per-Erik; Alf	Walked (Day 10)													
Henriette	Charlotte; Hilde C	Evicted (Day 5)														
Team Immune	Red	Green	Red	Green	Red	Red	Red	None	Red	None						
Plus (+)	Tom-Erik (3 votes)	Linda (3 votes)	Eyvinn (4 votes)	Frøydis (3 votes)	?? (? votes)	Tom-Erik (3 votes)	Tom-Erik (2 votes)	Frode (4 votes)	June (2 votes)	Tom-Erik (2 votes)	?? (? votes)	Dan (3 votes)	Frøydis (3 votes)	Dan (? votes)	None	
Minus (-) (1st Nominated)	Hilde C (6 votes)	Helge (5 votes)	Hilde C (4 votes)	Tone-Marie (2 votes)	Cathrin (? votes)	Charlotte (4 votes)	Eyvinn (2 votes)	Alf (5 votes)	Merita (2 votes)	June (5 votes)	Eyvinn (? votes)	Frode (3 votes)	Tom-Erik (2 votes)	Bjørn (?); Frøydis (?)	None	
2nd Nominated (By Plus (+))	Henriette	Per-Erik	Cathrin	Kristin	Tom-Erik	Dan	Stian	Merita	Frøydis	Bjørn	Dan	Frøydis	Bjørn	None	None	
Evicted	Henriette; 66.8% to evict	Per-Erik; 70% to evict	Hilde C 68.1% to evict	Tone-Marie; 76.7% to evict	Cathrin; 57.6% to evict	Charlotte; 89% to evict	Stian; 60% to evict	Merita; 91.6% to evict	Merita; 95% to evict	June; 63% to evict	Eyvinn; 74% to evict	Frode; 53.7% to evict	Tom-Erik; 61.7% to evict	Frøydis; 65.9% to evict		
Evicted	Henriette; 66.8% to evict	Per-Erik; 70% to evict	Hilde C 68.1% to evict	Tone-Marie; 76.7% to evict	Cathrin; 57.6% to evict	Charlotte; 89% to evict	Stian; 60% to evict	Merita; 91.6% to evict	Merita; 95% to evict	June; 63% to evict	Eyvinn; 74% to evict	Frode; 53.7% to evict	Tom-Erik; 61.7% to evict	Frøydis; 65.9% to evict	Dan; 46.4% to evict	Bjørn; 46.4% to evict
