= Bar 6 (TV Poland) =

Bar Europa is the sixth local season of the reality The Bar in Poland.

== Synopsis ==
- Start Date: 24 September 2005.
- End Date: 10 December 2005.
- Duration: 78 days.
- Contestants:
  - The Finalists: Thomas (The Winner), Alex (Runner-up), Tomasz (3rd) & Anna Tro (4th).
  - Evicted Contestants: Agnieszka, Anna Try, Artur, Dariusz, Dorota, Farida, Grzegorz, Jurate, Katarzyna, Luca, Ludmiła, Marcin, Marco, Patrycja, Robert, Sebastian, Serguei & Vadim.
  - Voluntary Exits: Jurate & Serguei.

=== Contestants ===
Polish
Contestant	Residence	Occupation	Age
Alex Muzolf	Poznań		31
Agnieszka Korcz	Poznań		18
Anna Troszczyńska	Częstochowa		22
Anna Trybuszewska	Poznań		22
Artur Gerula	Przemyśl		42
Dariusz Bubienko	Warsaw		25
Dorota Frąckiewicz	Warsaw		33
Farida Sober	Poznań		22
Grzegorz Popławski	Twardogóra		19
Katarzyna Szafron	Rybnik		20
Marcin Wojciechowski	Wrocław		19
Patrycja Jabłońska-Druź	Prószków		22
Sebastian Góralczyk	Kłecko		22
Tomasz Golonko	Warsaw		18
European
Contestant	Residence / Country	Occupation	Age
Jurate Alisauskaite-Kasprzyk	Vilnius, Lithuania		27
Luca Ali	Ravenna, Italy		33
Ludmiła Pitylak	Donetsk, Ukraine		21
Marco Bocchino	Savona, Italy		31
Robert Achilleas Tryfon	Thessaloniki, Greece		37
Serguei Jarkov	Szewczenko, Russia		22
Thomas Ames	Nottingham, England		28
Vadim Afanassiev	Volzhsky, Russia		38

=== Nominations ===
	Round 1	Round 2	Round 3	Round 4	Round 5	Round 6	Round 7	Round 8	Round 9	Round 10	Round 11	Final	
Thomas	Marco; Robert	Nominated vs. Vadim	Patrycja; Sebastian	Sebastian; Robert	Marco; Robert	Marco; Ludmiła	Alex; Farida	Grzegorz; Alex	Anna Tro; Tomasz	Marcin; Farida	Nominated	Winner (Day 78)	
Alex	Tomasz; Serguei	Anna Try; Luca	Robert; Thomas	Farida; Thomas	Tomasz; Thomas	Anna Try; Marco	Patrycja; Marco	Tomasz; Marco	Anna Try; Thomas	Tomasz; Marcin	Nominated	Runner-Up (Day 78)	
Tomasz	Anna Try; Vadim	Alex; Serguei	Farida; Marco	Anna Try; Artur	Anna Tro; Patrycja	Anna Try; Farida	Alex; Marco	Agnieszka; Thomas	Anna Try; Grzegorz	Patrycja; Anna Tro	Nominated	3rd Place (Day 78)	
Anna Troszczyńska	Not in The Bar		Anna Try; Thomas	Robert; Artur	Robert; Thomas	Tomasz; Anna Try	Alex; Farida	Marco; Anna Try	Tomasz; Dariusz	Grzegorz; Farida	Nominated	4th Place (Day 78)	
Patrycja	Anna Try; Dorota	Tomasz; Serguei	Thomas; Katarzyna	Ludmiła; Artur	Ludmiła; Anna Tro	Ludmiła; Anna Tro	Anna Try; Farida	Tomasz; Marco	Alex; Dariusz	Anna Try; Anna Tro	Nominated	Evicted (Day 77)	
Agnieszka	Not in The Bar							Tomasz; Thomas	Alex; Thomas	Tomasz; Thomas	Nominated	Evicted (Day 76)	
Marcin	Not in The Bar							Marco; Dariusz	Thomas; Dariusz	Thomas; Agnieszka	Nominated	Evicted (Day 76)	
Anna Trybuszewska	Ludmiła; Vadim	Patrycja; Luca	Tomasz; Katarzyna	Farida; Artur	Thomas; Anna Tro	Tomasz; Sebastian	Tomasz; Thomas	Farida; Marco	Alex; Marcin	Patrycja; Anna Tro	Nominated	Walked (Day 75)	
Grzegorz	Not in The Bar							Farida; Dariusz	Farida; Dariusz	Anna Tro; Thomas	Nominated	Evicted (Day 75)	
Farida	Sebastian; Dorota	Tomasz; Luca	Robert; Thomas	Anna Try; Artur	Anna Try; Anna Tro	Anna Try; Sebastian	Anna Try; Marco	Grzegorz; Thomas	Agnieszka; Dariusz	Grzegorz; Anna Tro	Evicted (Day 71)		
Dariusz	Not in The Bar							Tomasz; Thomas	Anna Tro; Farida	Evicted (Day 64)			
Marco	Serguei; Ludmiła	Katarzyna; Ludmiła	Robert; Ludmiła	Artur; Patrycja	Tomasz; Alex	Thomas; Ludmiła	Thomas; Ludmiła	Thomas; Alex	Evicted (Day 57)				
Ludmiła	Dorota; Vadim	Alex; Serguei	Patrycja; Katarzyna	Patrycja; Serguei	Marco; Sebastian	Alex; Thomas	Patrycja; Thomas	Evicted (Day 50)					
Sebastian	Alex; Serguei	Farida; Luca	Alex; Thomas	Robert; Artur	Alex; Thomas	Alex; Anna Try	Evicted (Day 43)						
Robert	Farida; Serguei	Farida; Luca	Patrycja; Thomas	Anna Tro; Thomas	Anna Tro; Thomas	Evicted (Day 36)							
Serguei	Luca; Thomas	Luca; Sebastian	Walked (Day 15)	Alex; Ludmiła	Re-Walked (Day 32)								
Artur	Not in The Bar		Robert; Thomas	Marco; Anna Try	Evicted (Day 29)								
Katarzyna	Ludmiła; Sebastian	Sebastian; Ludmiła	Robert; Ludmiła	Evicted (Day 22)									
Jurate	Alex; Dorota	Serguei; Ludmiła	Walked (Day 15)										
Vadim	Marco; Dorota	Nominated vs. Thomas	Evicted (Day 15)										
Luca	Serguei; Dorota	Marco; Farida	Evicted (Day 15)										
Dorota	Ludmiła; Luca	Evicted (Day 8)											
Highest Score	Marco (+2)	Alex (+2)	Robert (+5)	Farida (+2)	Tomasz (+2)	Tomasz (+2)	Alex (+3)	Tomasz (+4)	Alex (+3)	Patrycja (+2)	None		
Lowest Score (1st Nominated)	Dorota (-4)	Luca (-4)	Thomas (-5)	Artur (-5)	Thomas (-3)	Sebastian (-2)	Ludmiła (Voluntary)	Thomas (-3)	Dariusz (-5)	Anna Tro (-3)	None		
2nd Nominated (By Highest Score)	Ludmiła	Marco	Katarzyna	Serguei	Robert	Farida	Thomas	Marco	Marcin	Farida	None		
Evicted	Dorota; 62% to evict	Luca; 79% to evict	Katarzyna; 54% to evict	Artur; 75.75% to evict	Robert; 69% to evict	Sebastian; 52% to evict	Ludmiła; 78.5% to evict	Marco; 55% to evict	Dariusz; 76% to evict	Farida; 93% to evict	Anna Try; Grzegorz; Agnieszka; Marcin; Patrycja		
Evicted	Dorota; 62% to evict	Luca; 79% to evict	Katarzyna; 54% to evict	Artur; 75.75% to evict	Robert; 69% to evict	Sebastian; 52% to evict	Ludmiła; 78.5% to evict	Marco; 55% to evict	Dariusz; 76% to evict	Farida; 93% to evict	Anna Try; Grzegorz; Agnieszka; Marcin; Patrycja	Anna Tro ??% to win (Out of 4)	Tomasz ??% to win (Out of 4)
Evicted	Dorota; 62% to evict	Vadim; 72% to evict	Katarzyna; 54% to evict	Artur; 75.75% to evict	Robert; 69% to evict	Sebastian; 52% to evict	Ludmiła; 78.5% to evict	Marco; 55% to evict	Dariusz; 76% to evict	Farida; 93% to evict	Anna Try; Grzegorz; Agnieszka; Marcin; Patrycja	Alex; 24% to win	Thomas; 76% to win
