= Promi Big Brother season 8 =

Season of Promi Big Brother

Promi Big Brother
- Season 8
- Presented by: Jochen Schropp; Marlene Lufen
- No. of days: 24
- No. of housemates: 18
- Winner: Werner Hansch
- Runner-up: Mischa Mayer
- Companion shows: Die Late Night Show; Warm up Show mit Aaron; Raffas Recap; Oberts Märchenstunde; Das jüngste Gerücht
- No. of episodes: 22

Release
- Original network: Sat.1
- Original release: 7 August – 28 August 2020

Additional information
- Filming dates: 5 August – 28 August 2020

Season chronology
- ← Previous; Season 7 Next → Season 9

Promi Big Brother 2020, also known as Promi Big Brother 8, was the eighth season of the German reality television series Promi Big Brother. The show began airing on 7 August 2020 on Sat.1 and ended after 24 days on 28 August 2020, making it the longest celebrity season to date. It is the eighth celebrity season and the ninth season of the Big Brother franchise in total to air on Sat.1 to date. Jochen Schropp and Marlene Lufen both returned as hosts of the show.

The live late-night show with the name Die Late Night Show returned on sixx and was aired again every day after the main show on Sat.1. Jochen Bendel and Melissa Khalaj returned as hosts of the late-night show. Special guests joined the presenter duo to analyzing the situation of the show and it also features exclusive live broadcasts from the house.

The Watch Together Show from the previous season was replaced by the Warm up Show mit Aaron. The web show Warm up Show with Aaron was broadcast daily 20 minutes before the show on Facebook as well as on the website promibigbrother.de. In the show, Aaron Troschke speaks with a studio guest about the housemates and the TV episodes. In addition, audience comments on Facebook were integrated into the show. The show then was made available there on demand.

The short-minute web show entitled Raffas Recap was published on IGTV every day from 8 August 2020 at 7 a.m. There the YouTuber Raffaela "Raffa" Zollo commented on the events from the last TV episode.

Claudia Obert hosted a new web show with the name Oberts Märchenstunde for the first time on Joyn and promibigbrother.de. The show was broadcast every Sunday and Wednesday.

The web show Das jüngste Gerücht (The youngest rumor) was published on Facebook and IGTV on 22 July 2020. In the five- to seven-minute episodes commented and discussed the YouTubers Aaron Troschke and Raffaela "Raffa" Zollo, as well as changing guests as the winner of season 1 Jenny Elvers, TV personality Claudia Obert or YouTuber Mr. Trash TV all Speculation as to who might be on the show. Until 4 August 2020, a new episode and a total of five episodes were published on Wednesdays, Sundays and once on Tuesday.

Werner Hansch was announced as the winner of the season, with Mischa Mayer as the runner-up. As Jochen Schropp announced in the final, Werner Hansch, aged 82, is the world's oldest winner of Big Brother.

== Production ==
For the first time, the show will air live for 3 weeks.

=== Eye Logo ===
Like in the previous season the eye logo is the same.

=== Teasers ===
In July 2020, a one-minute teaser was released promoting the season.

=== Opening Intro ===
The song of this year intro and outro is "Mehr Davon" from Lotte. Like the previous season, the intro for the matches is "The Hanging Tree" from James Newton Howard feat. Jennifer Lawrence.

=== House ===
The official pictures of the new Promi Big Brother house were released on 6 August 2020. In this season, the house features again two areas: the Fairy Tale Castle as the Luxurious Area and the Fairy Tale Forest as the Poor Area.

=== Format ===
Once again, the residents in the poor area can go shopping in a small Penny market as part of a product placement. This time, however, the viewers decide via Sat.1-App.

For the first time there will be a wish tree in which the poor people can use luxury talers to wish for luxury items from Big Brother. The tree and thaler replace the big donor and big coins that were introduced in season five.

== Housemates ==
On 3 August 2020, were announced the first 12 celebrities housemates to be participating in this season. They entered the house on 5 August. The last four housemates, who will enter on 7 August, were announced the same day that entered the house. On 14 August and on 17 August, two new housemates entered the house.

On 4 August 2020, Saskia Beecks who would enter the house on the first day, it was announced that she will not be taking part in the eighth season of Promi Big Brother, for personal reasons. She was replaced by Jenny Frankhauser.

Celebrity	Age on entry	Notability	Day entered	Day exited	Status
Werner Hansch	81	Sports commentator	3	24	Winner
Mischa Mayer	28	TV personality	1	24	Runner-up
Kathy Kelly	57	Musician	1	24	3rd Place
Ikke Hüftgold	43	Singer	1	24	4th Place
Emmy Russ	21	TV personality	1	23	Evicted
Katy Bähm	26	Drag queen	3	23	Evicted
Simone Mecky-Ballack	44	TV personality, model	3	22	Evicted
Ramin Abtin	48	Kickboxing champion	3	21	Evicted
Aaron Königs	25	TV personality	13	20	Evicted
Sascha Heyna	45	Host, singer	1	19	Evicted
Adela Smajić	27	TV personality, host	1	18	Evicted
Udo Bönstrup	25	Comedian, YouTuber	1	17	Evicted
Elene Lucia Ameur	26	Actress	1	14	Walked
Alessia-Millane Herren	18	TV personality	10	13	Evicted
Jasmin Tawil	38	Actress	1	10	Evicted
Senay Güler	44	DJ, model, actor	1	8	Walked
Jenny Frankhauser	27	TV personality	1	8	Walked
Claudia Kohde-Kilsch	56	Former tennis player	1	6	Evicted

=== Aaron Königs ===
Aaron Königs is a television personality. He began his career on the German version of Prince Charming on 2019. He participated on 2020 on the show The Mole – Wem kannst du trauen?. He entered the House on Day 13. He became the seventh housemate to be evicted on Day 20.

=== Adela Smajić ===
Adela Smajić is a reality television personality. She began her career in 2018, where she was the Bachelorette in the Swiss version. She is a Presenter in the regional Swiss television broadcaster on Telebasel. She entered the House on Day 1. She became the fifth housemate to be evicted on Day 18.

=== Alessia-Millane Herren ===
Alessia-Millane Herren is the daughter of Willi Herren. She has participated in the show Ab ins Kloster! – Rosenkranz statt Randale. She is the youngest housemate in the history of Promi Big Brother. She entered the House on Day 10. She became the third housemate to be evicted on Day 13.

=== Claudia Kohde-Kilsch ===
Claudia Kohde-Kilsch was a big tennis player. Since 2019 she is a member of the Social Democratic Party of Germany. She entered the House on Day 1. She became the first housemate to be evicted on Day 6.

=== Elene Lucia Ameur ===
Elene Lucia Ameur is an actress and model. From 2018 until 2019 she has played in the series Berlin – Tag & Nacht. She entered the House on Day 1. On Day 14, she voluntarily left the house.

=== Emmy Russ ===
Emmy Russ is a reality television personality. She began her career in 2020, when she participated in the German reality show Beauty & The Nerd. She has participated also in the show Ab ins Kloster! – Rosenkranz statt Randale. She entered the House on Day 1. She became the eleventh housemate to be evicted on Day 23.

=== Ikke Hüftgold ===
Ikke Hüftgold is a singer and his real name is Matthias Distel. He entered the House on Day 1. He left the house on Day 24 in fourth place.

=== Jasmin Tawil ===
Jasmin Tawil is a German singer and actress. She has played in the series Gute Zeiten, schlechte Zeiten from 2005 until 2008. She was together with singer and songwriter Adel Tawil for 13 years and in 2011 they married until the separation in 2014. She entered the House on Day 1. She became the second housemate to be evicted on Day 10.

=== Jenny Frankhauser ===
Jenny Frankhauser is a TV personality. She became better known to the public as the sister of Daniela Katzenberger and as the winner of the 12th season of Ich bin ein Star – Holt mich hier raus!. She was the replacement for Saskia Beecks who quit the show prior to entering the house. She entered the House on Day 1. On Day 8, Jenny voluntarily left the house.

=== Kathy Kelly ===
Kathy Kelly is a musician. She is also a member of the musical family group The Kelly Family. She entered the House on Day 1. She left the house on Day 24 in third place.

=== Katy Bähm ===
Katy Bähm is a drag queen. Her real name is Burak Bildik. She participated at the first season of Queen of Drags. She entered the House on Day 3. She became the tenth housemate to be evicted on Day 23.

=== Mischa Mayer ===
Mischa Mayer is a reality television personality. He began his career on the third season of the German Love Island. He entered the House on Day 1. He left the house on Day 24 as the Runner-Up.

=== Ramin Abtin ===
Ramin Abtin is a Kickboxing world champion. He began his career as a coach on The Biggest Loser Germany. He entered the House on Day 3. He became the eighth housemate to be evicted on Day 21.

=== Sascha Heyna ===
Sascha Heyna is a shopping channel host and singer. He entered the House on Day 1. He became the sixth housemate to be evicted on Day 19.

=== Senay Güler ===
Senay Güler is a DJ, model and actor. He began his career as an actor in the television series 4 Blocks. He entered the House on Day 1. On Day 8, Senay voluntarily left the house.

=== Simone Mecky-Ballack ===
Simone Mecky-Ballack is a TV personality. She is the ex-wife of soccer player Michael Ballack. She participated in the sixth season of Let's Dance. She entered the House on Day 3. She became the ninth housemate to be evicted on Day 22.

=== Udo Bönstrup ===
Udo Bönstrup is a comedian and a German YouTuber. He entered the House on Day 1. He became the fourth housemate to be evicted on Day 17.

=== Werner Hansch ===
Werner Hansch is a Sports commentator. He is the oldest housemate in the history of Promi Big Brother. He entered the House on Day 3. He was announced as the winner of the season on Day 24.

== Castle and Forest ==
	Week 1								Week 2						Week 3						
	Day 1–3	Day 4	Day 5	Day 6	Day 7	Day 8	Day 9	Day 10	Day 11	Day 12–13	Day 14	Day 15	Day 16	Day 17	Day 18	Day 19	Day 20	Day 21	Day 22	Day 23	Day 24
Werner		Castle			Forest		Castle			Forest		Castle			Forest						Castle
Mischa	Forest					Castle	Forest			Castle		Forest									Castle
Kathy	Forest	Castle								Forest				Castle				Forest			Castle
Ikke	Forest	Castle		Forest	Castle					Forest		Castle			Forest						Castle
Emmy	Forest				Castle		Forest							Castle				Forest			
Katy		Forest			Castle					Forest											
Simone		Castle			Forest					Castle		Forest									
Ramin		Forest								Castle		Forest			Castle			Forest			
Aaron											Forest				Castle						
Sascha	Forest	Castle			Forest					Castle		Forest	Castle	Forest	Castle						
Adela	Forest									Castle		Forest									
Udo	Forest			Castle	Forest					Castle		Forest									
Elene	Forest							Castle		Forest											
Alessia									Forest												
Jasmin	Forest							Castle													
Senay	Forest				Castle	Forest															
Jenny	Forest	Castle	Forest																		
Claudia	Forest		Castle		Forest																
Reason	none	A	B	C	D	E	F	G	none	H, I	none	J	K	L	M	none		N	none		

=== Reason ===
- ^Note A : Ikke, Jenny, Kathy, Sascha, Simone and Werner moved from the Forest to the Castle and was decided by the viewers votes.
- ^Note B : Claudia moved from the Forest to the Castle and was decided by the housemates in the Castle. Jenny moved from the Castle to the Forest and was decided by the viewers votes.
- ^Note C : Udo moved from the Forest to the Castle and was decided by the housemates in the Castle. Ikke moved from the Castle to the Forest and was decided by the viewers votes.
- ^Note D : Emmy, Ikke, Katy and Senay moved from the Forest to the Castle and was decided by the viewers votes. Claudia, Sascha, Simone, Udo and Werner moved from the Castle to the Forest and was decided by the viewers votes.
- ^Note E : Mischa moved from the Forest to the Castle and was decided by the housemates in the Castle. Senay moved from the Castle to the Forest and was decided by the viewers votes.
- ^Note F : Werner moved from the Forest to the Castle and was decided by the housemates in the Castle. Emmy and Mischa moved from the Castle to the Forest and was decided by the viewers votes.
- ^Note G : At first the housemates in the Castle decided that Adela, Elene and Jasmin to move from the Forest to the Castle. Then the viewers decided that Adela should return to the Forest.
- ^Note H : On Day 12, at first Emmy from the Forest played a match and if she won it, she and her other housemates from the Forest would move to the Castle and the housemates from the Castle would move to the Forest. Emmy won the match and then all the housemates went to the Castle. At the end of the show the viewers decide which of the eight housemates that were in the Castle would return again to the Forest. They chose Alessia and Emmy.
- ^Note I : On Day 13, at first the housemates in the Forest decided that Simone to move with them, then the viewers votes decided that she must move again in the Castle.
- ^Note J : At first the housemates in the Castle lost the match and all move to the Forest. Then the viewers decided that Ikke and Werner to move to the Castle.
- ^Note K : The housemates in the Castle decided that Sascha to move with them. Sascha had the choice to take with him one housemate to the Castle. He choose Emmy. Then the viewers decided to move Emmy back again to the Forest.
- ^Note L : The housemates in the Forest decided themselves that Emmy, Kathy and Katy to move with them. Then the viewers decided to move Katy and Sascha back again to the Forest.
- ^Note M : The housemates had to play a match and the winner of each pair moved to the Castle and the loser to the Forest. Aaron, Emmy, Kathy, Ramin, Sascha and Udo won and moved to the Castle. Adela, Katy, Ikke, Mischa, Simone and Werner moved to the Forest.
- ^Note N : Since the housemates broke several rules the Castle was closed and everyone lived in the Forest.

== Arena ==
=== Match Arena ===
The housemates from the poor "Fairy Tale Forest" area compete in the "Outdoor Match Arena" in order to earn additional money for shopping at the supermarket.

Big Brother decide who would face the match
The housemates decided who would face the match

Match number	Air date	Name of match	Housemates participation	Maximum profit	Played profit	Total
1	7 August	"Tischlein deck dich"	Adela; Claudia; Elene; Emmy; Ikke; Jasmin; Jenny; Kathy; Mischa; Sascha; Senay; Udo	€12	€4,39	€16,39
2	8 August	"Dornröschen"	Katy; Mischa; Ramin	€10	€10	€20
3	9 August	"Alice im Wunderland"	Adela; Emmy; Jasmin; Jenny	€10	€10	€20
4	10 August	"Schwanensee"	Elene; Emmy; Katy	€10	€2	€12
5	11 August	"Rotkäppchen"	Elene; Werner	€10	€0	€10
6	12 August	"Schneewittchen"	Sascha; Simone; Udo	€9	€0	€9
7	13 August	"Aschenputtel"	Emmy; Mischa; Ramin	€9	€11	€20
8	15 August	"Hans und die Bohnenranke"	Emmy	Consequence: All housemates change their areas		
9	15 August	"Sindbad"	Elene; Ikke; Kathy; Katy	€5	€0	€5
10	16 August	"Prinzessin unter der Erbse"	Alessia; Kathy; Katy	€7	€7	€13
11	17 August	"Rapunzel"	Alessia; Emmy; Ikke; Katy	€7	€2,80	€9,80
12	18 August	"Packesel"	Adela; Mischa; Ramin	Defeat: All housemates of the Castle switch to the Forest		
13	19 August	"Froschkönig"	Aaron; Adela; Katy; Simone	€10	€10	€20
12	20 August	"Schneewittchen"	Emmy; Mischa; Ramin; Udo	€9	€0,80	€9,80
13	21 August	"Frau Holle"	Adela; Mischa; Katy	€6	€6	€12

=== Duel Arena ===
In addition to the Match, there are also Duels against each other.

Duel number	Air date	Housemates				Name of Duel	Winner	Consequence
1	10 August	Claudia		Udo		"Highest Tower made of Building Blocks"	Udo	Before the resident vote, Udo was allowed to determine whose vote should not count in the selection. He chose Elene.
2	14 August	Elene	Jasmin	Ramin	Werner	"Mind you"	Elene	Elene is no longer on the nomination list.
3	17 August	Ikke		Ramin		"Shake double bottles"	Ramin	For nominations made on the same day, the entire Fairy Tale Castle winner area receives nomination protection.
4	21 August	All housemates				"Cards"	Aaron; Emmy; Kathy; Ramin; Sascha	All housemates played in pairs and the winner moved to the Castle and the loser moved to the Forest.
5	22 August	Ikke; Simone		Emmy; Sascha		"The Star Money"	Emmy; Sascha	For nominations made on the same day, the entire Fairy Tale Castle winner area receives nomination protection and they also didn't nominate.
6	23 August	Ikke		Aaron		"Heir to the Throne"	Aaron	For nominations made on the same day, Aaron received immunity from eviction, whilst Ikke was automatically nominated.
7	24 August	Kathy; Mischa		Simone; Katy		"The Little Mermaid"	Simone; Katy	Simone and Katy qualified for the second duel.
7	24 August	Simone		Katy		"Beer Pong"	Katy	For nominations made on the same day, Katy received immunity and Simone a killer nomination which both could opt to give to another housemate.
8	25 August	Werner; Ikke; Mischa; Katy		Kathy; Simone; Ramin; Emmy		"Knight duel"	Werner; Ikke; Mischa; Katy	Werner had to decide which teammate will be saved from the nomination and he chose Katy while Kathy had to decide which teammate was immediately nominated. She chose Ramin.
9	26 August	Katy; Mischa		Emmy; Simone		"Men vs Women"	Katy; Mischa	The nominations of the men counted twice.
10	27 August	Ikke; Emmy; Kathy		Mischa; Katy; Werner		"Captain Hook vs Peter Pan"	Mischa; Katy; Werner	The winning team won a second vote in the first nomination of the night.

== Nominations table ==
	Day 6	Day 10	Day 13	Day 17	Day 18	Day 19	Day 20	Day 21	Day 22	Day 23		Day 24 Final		Nominations received
	Day 6	Day 10	Day 13	Day 17	Day 18	Day 19	Day 20	Day 21	Day 22	Round 1	Round 2	Day 24 Final		Nominations received
Werner	Claudia	Adela, Udo	Elene	Udo, Adela	Simone	Sascha	Emmy	Emmy	Emmy (2x)	Emmy, Katy	Emmy	Winner (Day 24)		8
Mischa	Claudia	Werner, Jasmin	Elene	Udo, Sascha	Werner	Sascha	Emmy	Emmy	Emmy (2x)	Emmy, Katy	Emmy	Runner-up (Day 24)		6
Kathy	Udo	Ramin, Werner	Elene	Udo, Ramin	Immune	Mischa	Ramin	Simone	Simone	Katy	Mischa	Third place (Day 24)		7
Ikke	Claudia	Ramin, Mischa	Elene	Aaron, Ramin	Adela	Ramin	Ramin	Emmy	Kathy (2x)	Kathy	Kathy	Fourth place (Day 24)		5
Emmy	Udo	Kathy, Jasmin	Elene	Katy, Udo	Immune	Ramin	Ramin	Simone	Werner	Katy	Mischa	Evicted (Day 23)		17
Katy	Udo	Ramin, Sascha	Elene	Udo, Ramin	Adela	Sascha	Ramin	Simone	Simone (2x)	Ikke, Kathy	Evicted (Day 23)			11
Simone	Udo	Emmy, Mischa	Elene	Udo, Aaron	Katy	Sascha	Emmy	Emmy	Emmy	Evicted (Day 22)				8
Ramin	Udo	Katy, Ikke	Elene	Udo, Ikke	Immune	Katy	Ikke	Ikke	Evicted (Day 21)					19
Aaron	Not in House			Udo, Ramin	Immune	Ramin	Ramin	Evicted (Day 20)						2
Sascha	Claudia	Jasmin, Werner	Alessia	Udo, Ramin	Immune	Ramin	Evicted (Day 19)							7
Adela	Claudia	Werner, Kathy	Elene	Udo, Katy	Werner	Evicted (Day 18)								4
Udo	Nominated	Katy, Jasmin	Alessia	Ramin, Simone	Evicted (Day 17)									11
Elene	~~Claudia~~	Werner, Ramin	Katy	Walked (Day 14)										10
Alessia	Not in House		Elene	Evicted (Day 13)										2
Jasmin	Claudia	Sascha, Mischa	Evicted (Day 10)											4
Senay	Udo	Walked (Day 8)												0
Jenny	Claudia	Walked (Day 8)												0
Claudia	Nominated	Evicted (Day 6)												0
Notes	1, 2	3	4	none	5	6	7, 8	9	10	11		none		
Against public vote	All housemates	~~Elene,~~; Jasmin, ~~Jenny,~~; Ramin, Werner	Alessia, Elene	Ramin, Udo	Adela, Werner	Ikke, Ramin, Sascha	Aaron, Emmy, Ramin, Simone	Emmy, Ramin, Simone	Emmy, Simone	Emmy, Kathy; Katy	Emmy, Mischa	Ikke, Kathy, Mischa, Werner		
Walked	none	Jenny, Senay	none	Elene	none									
Evicted	Claudia; 7 of 13 votes to evict	Jasmin; Fewest votes to save	Alessia; Fewest votes to save	Udo; 44.17% to save	Adela; 11.63% to save	Sascha; 22.28% to save	Aaron; 26.47% to save	Ramin; 31.24% to save	Simone; 49.53% to save	Katy; 18.61% to save	Emmy; 38.08% to save	Ikke; Fewest votes (out of 4)	Kathy; Fewest votes (out of 3)	
Evicted	Claudia; 7 of 13 votes to evict	Jasmin; Fewest votes to save	Alessia; Fewest votes to save	Udo; 44.17% to save	Adela; 11.63% to save	Sascha; 22.28% to save	Aaron; 26.47% to save	Ramin; 31.24% to save	Simone; 49.53% to save	Katy; 18.61% to save	Emmy; 38.08% to save	Mischa; 34.53% (out of 2)	Werner; 65.47% to win	

=== Notes ===
- ^Note 1 : For the first time in history of Promi Big Brother, the viewers were given the power to determine which housemates are nominated for the eviction. Claudia and Udo had the fewest votes and were nominated. The remaining housemates decide which one of them will be evicted.
- ^Note 2 : Before the voting Claudia and Udo, as the nominees, played a game in the Duel Arena and the winner would pick a housemate that his/her vote would not count. Udo, as the winner, picked Elene and her vote didn't counted.
- ^Note 3 : As a punishment for breaking Big Brother's rules, Elene and Jenny were automatically put up for eviction by Big Brother. Jenny voluntarily left the house on Day 8 prior to the eviction. Elene saved herself from eviction by winning a challenge. Werner received the most votes in a vote count and was therefore saved from eviction.
- ^Note 4 : Ramin won the Bottle Shake duel against Ikke, therefore all Castle housemates were immune from eviction.
- ^Note 5 : Emmy and Sascha won the duel, therefore all Castle housemates were immune from eviction and they didn't nominate.
- ^Note 6 : Aaron and Ikke faced off in the duel, in which Aaron won immunity. By losing, Ikke was automatically up for eviction. Only male housemates were allowed to be nominated in face-to-face nominations.
- ^Note 7 : After Sascha's eviction, housemates were told to rank themselves who deserved winning the most. The housemates ranked last automatically gets nominated. Aaron was ranked last, so he is nominated for eviction.
- ^Note 8 : As the result of that night's Duel, Simone received a killer nomination and Katy received immunity. Both could opt to give it to another housemate not already nominated. Simone and Katy chose to keep it for themselves.
- ^Note 9 : As the result of that night's Duel Werner could save one teammate and he chose Katy while Kathy had to decide which teammate would be nominated immediately. She chose Ramin.
- ^Note 10 : As the result of that night's Duel the votes of the men counted twice.
- ^Note 11 : One day before the final two housemates had to leave the house. After the match Katy, Mischa and Werner won a second vote for the first nomination of the night.

== Ratings ==
Week	Episode	Title	Air date	Timeslot	Viewers (in millions)		Share (in %)	
Week	Episode	Title	Air date	Timeslot	Total	14-49 Years	Total	14-49 Years
1	1	"Day 1: Sixteen Move in and the First Tears"	7 August 2020	Friday 8:15 p.m.	1.88	0.86	10.1	17.7
1	2	"Day 2: Hot Flirts and Senay's Freaking Out"	8 August 2020	Saturday 10:10 p.m.	1.30	0.57	7.4	11.7
1	3	"Day 3: Drama, Baby!"	9 August 2020	Sunday 10:15 p.m.	1.49	0.72	8.6	14.1
1	4	"Day 4: The First Exit - A Shock for Katy Bähm!"	10 August 2020	Monday 8:15 p.m.	1.65	0.81	7.1	12.7
1	5	"Day 5: Ikke's Transformation and Werner's Tragic Secret"	11 August 2020	Tuesday 10:15 p.m.	1.33	0.60	8.0	12.3
1	6	"Day 6: No Happy Endings for Jenny and Senay"	12 August 2020	Wednesday 10:15 p.m.	1.34	0.60	8.3	12.6
1	7	"Day 7: Ikke Hüftgold shares a Painful Memory"	13 August 2020	Thursday 10:15 p.m.	1.53	0.63	9.1	12.4
1	8	"Day 8: Versext and sewn up - Emmy faces Competition"	14 August 2020	Friday 8:15 p.m.	1.59	0.68	6.7	10.7
2	9	"Day 9: Emmy Gets Bitterly Disappointed"	15 August 2020	Saturday 10:15 p.m.	1.76	0.81	9.0	14.7
2	10	"Day 10: First the Party, then the Escalation"	16 August 2020	Sunday 10:15 p.m.	1.73	0.79	9.8	15.0
2	11	"Day 11: A New Prince Charming for Fairytale Land"	17 August 2020	Monday 8:15 p.m.	1.84	0.84	7.5	12.8
2	12	"Day 12: Elene's Escape and Aaron's Arrival in Fairytale Forest"	18 August 2020	Tuesday 10:15 p.m.	1.63	0.73	9.6	14.5
2	13	"Day 13: Of Lost Partners and Lost Fathers"	19 August 2020	Wednesday 10:15 p.m.	1.61	0.67	9.1	12.7
2	14	"Day 14: Katy's Self-Staging is Causing Trouble"	20 August 2020	Thursday 10:15 p.m.	1.48	0.60	9.3	13.9
2	15	"Day 15: Simone's Meltdown and the Third Exit"	21 August 2020	Friday 8:15 p.m.	1.87	0.86	8.3	15.3
3	16	"Day 16: Three Naked Peeks in a Row - Emmy Has Enough!"	22 August 2020	Saturday 10:15 p.m.	1.68	0.72	8.6	12.9
3	17	"Day 17: Between Big Emotions and a Lot of Bare Skin"	23 August 2020	Sunday 10:15 p.m.	1.68	0.63	7.9	9.2
3	18	"Day 18: Rule Break - This Punishment Is Shocking the Housemates!"	24 August 2020	Monday 8:15 p.m.	1.87	0.82	7.2	11.8
3	19	"Day 19: Ramin Comes Clean and Emmy Takes Stick"	25 August 2020	Tuesday 8:15 p.m.	1.83	0.91	6.8	12.8
3	20	"Day 20: Everyone Against Emmy and Big Brother's Big Reveal"	26 August 2020	Wednesday 8:15 p.m.	1.73	0.78	6.5	10.7
3	21	"Day 21: Shocking Double Exit Before the Final"	27 August 2020	Thursday 8:15 p.m.	1.94	0.86	7.6	12.4
3	22	"Day 22: The Spectacular Final of 2020"	28 August 2020	Friday 8:15 p.m.	2.17	0.98	9.8	16.3
