= Promi Big Brother season 9 =

Season of Promi Big Brother

Promi Big Brother
- Season 9
- Presented by: Jochen Schropp; Marlene Lufen
- No. of days: 24
- No. of housemates: 18
- Winner: Melanie Müller
- Runner-up: Uwe Abel
- Companion shows: Die Late Night Show; Das jüngste Gerücht
- No. of episodes: 22

Release
- Original network: Sat.1
- Original release: 6 August – 27 August 2021

Additional information
- Filming dates: 4 August – 27 August 2021

Season chronology
- ← Previous; Season 8 Next → Season 10

Promi Big Brother 2021, also known as Promi Big Brother 9, is the ninth season of the German reality television series Promi Big Brother. The show began airing on 6 August 2021 on Sat.1 and will end after 24 days on 27 August 2021, making it the second longest celebrity season to date. It is the ninth celebrity season and the tenth season of the Big Brother franchise to air on Sat.1 to date. Jochen Schropp and Marlene Lufen both returned as hosts of the show.

== Production ==
=== Eye logo ===
Like in the previous season, the eye logo is the same.

=== Teasers ===
In July 2021, a twenty-second teaser promoting the season was released.

=== Opening intro ===
The song of this year's intro and outro is "The Passenger" from season 1 housemate David Hasselhoff. Like in the previous season, the intro for the matches is "The Hanging Tree" from James Newton Howard featuring Jennifer Lawrence.

=== House ===
This year's overall and house theme is space. As with previous seasons, the house is separated into two areas: the "Everything" area, known as "Big Planet", and the "Nothing" area, known as "Space Station". Unlike in previous seasons, however, there are no walls completely separating the two areas. Instead, there is a small area where the two sides can meet each other. The area was revealed on Day 6.

The "everything" area, Big Planet, consist of an open dome for the lounge and bedroom, as well as an outdoor kitchen and dining area with a jacuzzi and an upstairs balcony area, encouraging more discussions and gossips amongst other housemates.

The "Nothing" area, Space Station, is a combination of all rooms in one area, with little and cramped space to walk and no outdoor lightning from the inside. Penny also returned for this season, known as "Space Penny". In addition, housemates in the Space Station will also have to wear a uniform at all times. On Days 1-3, Big Brother would provide dried food as initial housemates' basic rations. The food was then discarded on Day 3, in favour of the return of Penny.

=== Spin-off shows ===
==== Die Late Night Show ====
The live late-night show with the name Die Late Night Show returned and will air every day after the main show. Unlike in previous seasons, the late night show will not be broadcast on sixx, but on Sat.1. Jochen Bendel and Melissa Khalaj returned as hosts of the late-night show. Special guests joined the presenter duo to analyze the situation of the show and it also features exclusive live broadcasts from the house.

===== Special guests =====
Episode	Air date	Special guests
1	6 August 2021	Sam Dylan, Miss Chantal, Kathy Kelly
2	7 August 2021	Dolly Buster, Julian F. M. Stoeckel
3	8 August 2021	Janine Pink, Grandmaster Sunshine
4	9 August 2021	Anastasiya Avilova, Jade Übach
5	10 August 2021	Cora Schumacher, Tobias Wegener
6	11 August 2021	Heike Maurer, Mischa Mayer, Gisela Toennes
7	12 August 2021	Iris Abel, Kader Loth
8	13 August 2021	Cinzia-Paulina Draeger, Petra Draeger, Gina-Lisa Lohfink
9	14 August 2021,	Jochen Schropp, Marlene Lufen, Rafi Rachek
10	15 August 2021	Ginger Costello-Wollersheim, Bert Wollersheim
11	16 August 2021	Eko Fresh, Pascal Kappés
12	17 August 2021	Kate Merlan, Nico Schwanz
13	18 August 2021	Dennis Aogo, Lilo von Kiesenwetter, Barbara „Babs“ Kijewski
14	19 August 2021	Emmy Russ, Micaela Schäfer
15	20 August 2021	Regina Halmich, Payton Ramolla, Gitta Saxx
16	21 August 2021	Aaron Königs, Mademoiselle Nicolette
17	22 August 2021	Lorenz Büffel, Chethrin Schulze
18	23 August 2021	Marc Eggers, Jörg Draeger
19	24 August 2021	Elena Gruschka, Max Lessmann, Paco Steinbeck
20	25 August 2021	Mia Magma, Eric Sindermann, Daniela Büchner
21	26 August 2021	Julian F. M. Stoeckel, Natascha Ochsenknecht, Ina Aogo
22	27 August 2021	Janine Pink, Olivia Jones, Papis Loveday, Uwe Abel, Melanie Müller

==== Das jüngste Gerücht ====
The web show Das jüngste Gerücht (The youngest rumor) was published on Facebook and IGTV from 22 July 2021. In the five- to seven-minute episodes, Jochen Bendel and Melissa Khalaj commented on and discussed all speculation as to who might be entering the house. Until 1 August 2021, a new episode and a total of four episodes were published on Thursday, Monday, Wednesday and Sunday. On the fourth episode, Cora Schumacher joined Bendel and Khalaj on the show. The fifth and last episode was published on 6 August.

== Housemates ==
On 3 August 2021, the first 8 celebrities housemates, participating in this season, were announced. The ninth housemate Jörg Draeger was confirmed by Sat.1 on August 5 in the press conference. Following the press conference, Daniela Büchner, Danny Liedtke and Marie Lang were announced as further housemates.

On Day 6, three further celebrity housemates, Papis Loveday, Payton Ramolla, Gitta Saxx were moved in, with two more on Day 8, Barbara "Babs" Kijewski and Pascal Kappés. During the show, Babs did not disclose her age on the show.

Celebrity	Age on entry	Notability	Day entered	Day exited	Status
Melanie Müller	33	Party singer, participant in Der Bachelor	1	24	Winner
Uwe Abel	51	Participants at Bauer sucht Frau	1	24	Runner-up
Danny Liedtke	31	Actor	3	24	3rd Place
Papis Loveday	44	Model	6	24	4th Place
Marie Lang	34	Kickboxer and model	3	23	Evicted
Ina Aogo	32	Influencer, Podcaster, Wife of former football player Dennis Aogo	1	23	Evicted
Daniela Büchner	43	Reality TV actress at Goodbye Deutschland!	3	22	Evicted
Eric Sindermann	33	Handball player and fashion designer, candidate at Ex on the Beach	1	22	Evicted
Paco Steinbeck	46	Antique dealer	6	21	Evicted
Jörg Draeger	75	Former news anchor at NDR, presenter of Geh aufs Ganze!	3	20	Evicted
Gitta Saxx	56	Playmate and model	6	17	Evicted
Payton Ramolla	21	Influencer	6	17	Evicted
Barbara "Babs" Kijewski	N/A	Professional angler and influencer	8	15	Evicted
Pascal Kappés	31	Actor, model and influencer	8	13	Evicted
Rafi Rachek	31	Participant in Die Bachelorette	1	11	Evicted
Mimi Gwozdz	27	Winner of Der Bachelor	1	10	Walked
Heike Maurer	68	TV presenter	1	8	Evicted
Daniel Kreibich	37	Clairvoyant, AstroTV presenter	1	4	Walked

== Big Planet and Space Station ==
	Week 1								Week 2							Week 3						
	Day 1–3	Day 4	Day 5	Day 6	Day 7	Day 8	Day 9	Day 10	Day 11	Day 12	Day 13	Day 14	Day 15	Day 16	Day 17	Day 18	Day 19	Day 20	Day 21	Day 22	Day 23	Day 24
Melanie	Space; Station					Big; Planet				Space; Station			Big; Planet	Space; Station	Big; Planet			Space; Station				Big; Planet
Uwe	Space; Station					Big; Planet				Space; Station								Big; Planet			Space; Station	Big; Planet
Danny		Space; Station		Big; Planet	Space; Station	Big; Planet				Space; Station					Big; Planet			Space; Station				Big; Planet
Papis					Space; Station					Big; Planet			Space; Station	Big; Planet	Space; Station			Big; Planet			Space; Station	Big; Planet
Marie		Space; Station	Big; Planet			Space; Station							Big; Planet	Space; Station			Big; Planet	Space; Station				
Ina	Space; Station	Big; Planet			Space; Station								Big; Planet	Space; Station				Big; Planet			Space; Station	
Daniela		Space; Station				Big; Planet		Space; Station		Big; Planet	Space; Station							Big; Planet				
Eric	Space; Station					Big; Planet			Space; Station				Big; Planet	Space; Station								
Paco					Space; Station				Big; Planet				Space; Station	Big; Planet			Space; Station	Big; Planet				
Jörg		Space; Station		Big; Planet		Space; Station				Big; Planet			Space; Station	Big; Planet				Space; Station				
Gitta					Big; Planet	Space; Station				Big; Planet			Space; Station	Big; Planet	Space; Station							
Payton					Space; Station	Big; Planet			Space; Station													
Babs							Space; Station		Big; Planet	Space; Station												
Pascal							Big; Planet		Space; Station													
Rafi	Space; Station	Big; Planet		Space; Station																		
Mimi	Space; Station		Big; Planet	Space; Station																		
Heike	Space; Station	Big; Planet				Space; Station																
Daniel	Space; Station																					
Reason	none	A	B	C	D	E	F	G	H	I	J	none	K	L	M	none	N	O	none		P	Q

=== Reasons ===
- ^Note A : Melanie & Eric and Rafi & Ina played in the Duel Arena and the two duo winners would move in the Big Planet. Rafi & Ina won the game. Big Brother gave the chance to the both winners, to choose also two housemates from the Space Station to move to the Big Planet. They choose Heike and Mimi. Then the viewers would choose, who from the 4 housemates would move again from the Big Planet to the Space Station. They choose Mimi.
- ^Note B : All housemates from the Space Station played in the Duel Arena and the winner would move to the Big Planet. Marie won the duel and moved to the other side. Big Brother gave the chance to Marie to pick two housemates from the Space Station to move with her in the Big Planet. She chose Mimi and Daniela. Then the TV viewers voted for Daniela to move back to the Space Station.
- ^Note C : The housemates from the Space Station played in the Duel Arena and the winners would move to Big Planet. Melanie, Jörg and Danny won the Duel. The viewers voted for the eight housemates, who were in the Big Planet, and three of them would move to Space Station. Melanie, Rafi and Mimi had the most votes and moved to the Space Station.
- ^Note D : Four brand new housemates, Paco, Gitta, Papis and Payton competed in the Duel Arena to decide who goes to each area. Papis and Gitta won the Duel, moving them to the Big Planet, with Paco and Payton moving to the Space Station. As the winners of the Duel, Papis and Gitta then have to choose a housemate each to send to the Space Station. They chose Ina and Danny respectively. Soon after, the viewers voted Papis to move to the Space Station.
- ^Note E : The housemates from the Big Planet chose four housemates from the Space Station for the Duel. If they won, they can stay in the area. If they lost, they would have to switch areas with them. They chose Uwe, Eric, Daniela and Payton. Uwe, Eric, Daniela and Payton ultimately won, meaning that the housemates from the Big Planet has to switch places with the four housemates from the Space Station they competed with. The viewers then voted Melanie and Danny to move to the Big Planet.
- ^Note F : New housemates, Babs and Pascal competed in a duel. Pascal won and moved to the Big Planet, while Babs moved to the Space Station.
- ^Note G : The viewers voted Daniela to move to the Space Station.
- ^Note H : Each area chose a male housemate and a female housemate to compete in a duel. The Space Station chose Babs and Paco, while the Big Planet chose Pascal and Payton. Babs and Paco won, switching areas with Pascal and Payton. The viewers then voted Eric to move to the Space Station.
- ^Note I : Big Brother initially moved all the housemates from the Big Planet to the Space Station. All housemates in the Space Station (before the move) competed in a duel in pairs, with only one of the pair competing. Papis and Daniela won the Duel, moving them to the Big Planet. Papis also had the power to select three housemates from the Space Station to join them. He chose Paco, Jörg and Gitta to move to the Big Planet.
- ^Note J : The viewers voted Daniela to move to the Space Station.
- ^Note K : Babs, Eric, Ina and Melanie won the Match Arena and moved to the Big Planet, while Paco, Papis, Jörg and Gitta lost the Match Arena and had to move to the Space Station. The four winners could pick one housemate from the Space Station to move with them in the Big Planet. They choose Marie. At the end of the Live Show on the 17th August the viewers voted for Babs to return to the Space Station.
- ^Note L : Due to a measurement error in the previous duel, Big Brother reverted back the area changes on Day 14.
- ^Note M : As the team captain of the winning team in the duel, Paco chose Danny, Daniela and Melanie to join them in the Big Planet. The viewers then voted Daniela, Gitta and Papis to move to the Space Station.
- ^Note N : The housemates in the Big Planet had to choose one person to move to the Space Station. They chose Paco. In exchange for the move, Paco must also name two housemates from the Space Station to move to the Big Planet. He chose Eric and Marie. The viewers then voted Eric to move back to the Space Station.
- ^Note O : Daniela, Paco, Papis and Uwe won the duel, exchanging areas with Danny, Jörg, Marie and Melanie. The viewers then voted Ina to move to the Big Planet.
- ^Note P : All housemates were merged into the Space Station.
- ^Note Q : All housemates were moved to the Big Planet for the finale.

== Duel Arena ==
The Duel Arena, also known as the match Arena, returned for this season. The Duel Arena is mainly served to determine the areas of where each housemate would be as well as other decisions from supermarket budget to nominations. Most of the games are space-themed as per this season's theme. In most of the duels, housemates in the Space Station would have to compete with the housemates in the Big Planet for area exchanges and some miscellaneous duels. In the case of a tie, the housemates in the Big Planet would automatically win the duel.

Housemates from the Big Planet
Housemates from the Space Station

=== Area Exchange ===
The housemates in the Space Station have an opportunity to move to the Big Planet, if won the duel. New housemates also have to compete against each other to determine their area to stay. In later duels, the housemates in the Big Planet would also have to compete against the housemates in the Space Station to stay in their area

Duel number	Air date	Housemates participated					Winner(s)	Outcome
1	6 August 2021	Eric; Melanie			Ina; Rafi		Ina; Rafi	Ina and Rafi moved to the Big Planet.
2	7 August 2021	Danni; Danny; Eric; Jörg; Marie; Melanie; Mimi; Uwe					Marie	Marie moved to the Big Planet.
3	8 August 2021	Danni; Eric; Uwe			Danny; Jörg; Melanie		Danny; Jörg; Melanie	Danny, Jörg and Melanie moved to the Big Planet.
4	9 August 2021	Gitta; Papis			Paco; Payton		Gitta; Papis	Gitta and Papis moved to the Big Planet, while Paco and Payton moved to the Space Station.
5	10 August 2021	Gitta; Heike; Jörg; Marie			Daniela; Eric; Payton; Uwe		Daniela; Eric; Payton; Uwe	Daniela, Eric, Payton and Uwe moved to the Big Planet, while Gitta, Heike, Jörg and Marie moved to the Space Station.
6	11 August 2021	Danny; Eric; Payton; Melanie			Ina; Marie; Mimi; Rafi		Danny; Eric; Payton; Melanie	Everyone stayed in their respective areas.
7	11 August 2021	Babs			Pascal		Pascal	Pascal moved to the Big Planet, while Babs moved to the Space Station.
8	12 August 2021	Danny; Melanie			Marie; Papis		Danny; Melanie	Everyone stayed in their respective areas.
9	13 August 2021	Pascal; Payton			Babs; Paco		Babs; Paco	Babs and Paco moved to the Big Planet, while Pascal and Payton moved to the Space Station.
10	14 August 2021	Papis; Daniela	Rafi; Payton	Gitta; Pascal	Ina; Jörg	Marie; Eric	Papis; Daniela	Papis and Daniela moved to the Big Planet.
11	17 August 2021	Paco; Papis; Jörg; Gitta			Babs; Eric; Ina; Melanie		Babs; Eric; Ina; Melanie	Babs, Eric, Ina and Melanie moved to the Big Planet, while Paco, Papis, Jörg and Gitta moved to the Space Station.
12	18 August 2021	Daniela			Melanie		Melanie	Melanie, Ina, Marie and Uwe were eligible to compete in another duel against the housemates in the Big Planet. (Paco, Gitta, Jörg, Papis)
13	18 August 2021	Paco; Gitta; Jörg; Papis			Melanie; Ina; Marie; Uwe		Paco; Gitta; Jörg; Papis	Everyone stayed in their respective areas.
14	22 August 2021	Danny; Jörg; Marie; Melanie			Daniela; Paco; Papis; Uwe		Daniela; Paco; Papis; Uwe	Daniela, Paco, Papis and Uwe moved to the Big Planet, while Danny, Jörg, Marie and Melanie moved to the Space Station.

=== Nominations Influence ===
The housemates have a chance to influence the nominations by winning the duel.

Duel number	Air date	Housemates participated		Winner(s)	Outcome
1	14 August 2021	Daniela; Gitta; Ina; Melanie; Paco; Rafi		Melanie	Melanie no longer faced the public vote on Day 11.
2	15 August 2021	Daniela; Gitta; Jörg; Paco; Papis	Danny; Eric; Marie; Payton; Uwe	Danny; Eric; Marie; Payton; Uwe	Danny, Eric, Marie, Payton and Uwe were immune from nominations on Day 13.
3	16 August 2021	Paco; Papis	Babs; Pascal	Paco; Papis	Paco and Papis were eligible to compete in another duel for immunity from nominations on Day 13.
4	16 August 2021	Paco	Papis	Papis	Papis was immune from nominations on Day 13.
5	18 August 2021	Gitta; Jörg; Paco; Papis	Daniela; Danny; Payton; Uwe	Daniela; Danny; Payton; Uwe	Daniela, Danny, Payton and Uwe were eligible to choose envelopes containing cards affecting the nominations on Day 15.
6	20 August 2021	Danny; Jörg; Melanie; Paco	Eric; Ina; Papis; Payton	Eric; Ina; Papis; Payton	Eric, Ina, Papis, Payton were able to choose one person from their team to be immune from nominations for the first round of nominations on Day 17.
7	20 August 2021	Danny; Jörg; Melanie; Paco	Daniela; Gitta; Marie; Uwe	Danny; Jörg; Melanie; Paco	Danny, Jörg, Melanie, Paco were able to make two nominations instead of one, for the second round of nominations on Day 17. They were also the only ones to nominate for that round. The losers, Daniela, Gitta, Marie, Uwe, had to choose one person from their team to automatically be nominated for that round of nominations.
8	24 August 2021	Ina; Papis	Eric; Melanie	Ina; Papis	All housemates in the Big Planet (Daniela, Ina, Papis and Uwe) were immune from nominations on Day 21. They were also the only ones nominating for that round.
9	25 August 2021	Daniela; Papis; Uwe	Danny; Marie; Melanie	Danny; Marie; Melanie	Danny, Marie and Melanie were eligible to compete for the final ticket in the next duel.
10	25 August 2021	Danny; Marie; Melanie		Danny	Danny won the final ticket, granting him immunity from nominations until the finale.
11	26 August 2021	Danny; Marie; Melanie; Papis; Uwe		Melanie	For the second nominations for Day 23, Melanie had to choose either to nominate two housemates for eviction or nominate one housemate for eviction, but with double points for that housemate.

=== Miscellaneous Duels ===
In rare occasions, housemates have an opportunity to earn luxuries and reward, if they win the duel, other than area exchange or nominations.

Duel number	Air date	Housemates participated		Winner(s)	Outcome
1	9 August 2021	Melanie; Rafi		none	Melanie and Rafi earned 6€ in addition to the Space Station's shopping budget on that day.
2	21 August 2021	Daniela; Eric	Ina; Marie	Ina; Marie	Ina and Marie received their video messages from home.
3	22 August 2021	Daniela; Ina; Papis; Uwe	Danny; Eric; Marie; Melanie	Daniela; Ina; Papis; Uwe	Daniela, Papis, Paco and Uwe received their video messages from home.

== Supermarket Purchases ==
The Penny market, which is part of a Product placement, once again serves as a supermarket where the housemates of the poor area can shop on a budget. This is now referred to as a supply capsule. In this season, the housemates decide among themselves who is allowed to shop. Each housemate can only go shopping once.

The housemates have the budget of 1€ per person per day per shopping. The remainder money does not carry over to the next day. Occasionally, they also have a chance to earn more money from Duels.

Air date	Housemate	Time	Budget	Spent	Remainder
6 August 2021	Melanie	1 minute	9,00€	8,95€	0,05€
7 August 2021	Eric	1 minute	5,00€	4,60€	0,40€
8 August 2021	Uwe	1 minute	5,75€	4,55€	1,20€
9 August 2021	Daniela	1 minute	14,00€	12,79€	1,21€
10 August 2021	Rafi	1 minute	11,00€	5,42€	5,58€
11 August 2021	Rafi	1 minute	9,00€	7,69€	1,31€
12 August 2021	Gitta	1 minute	9,00€	8,47€	0,53€
13 August 2021	Ina	1 minute and 10 seconds	9,00€	8,63€	0,37€
14 August 2021	Babs	1 minute	10,00€	8,66€	1,34€
15 August 2021	Marie	1 minute	9,00€	8,52€	0,48€
16 August 2021	Payton	1 minute	10,00€	7,24€	2,76€
17 August 2021	Danny	1 minute	9,00€	8,51€	0,49€
18 August 2021	Melanie	1 minute	9,00€	7,54€	1,46€
19 August 2021	Payton	1 minute	7,41€	6,63€	0,78€
20 August 2021	Papis	1 minute and 51 seconds	11,11€	10,11€	1,00€
21 August 2021	Marie	45 seconds			
22 August 2021	Jörg	45 seconds	5,00€	2,66€	2,34€
23 August 2021	Danny	45 seconds	9,00€		
24 August 2021	Iris	45 seconds	4,00€	3,90€	0,10€
25 August 2021	All housemates	45 seconds	Unlimited		N/A

1. As the amount spent ended with a one, all housemates in the Space Station were able to choose one extra item each from the supermarket.
2. The cash register crashed before the timer ended. This was the amount before the double scan of an item and the crash. Jörg was able to keep all the items he purchased up to that point, despite multiple mistakes.
3. Iris is a guest on the show on Day 21, known for being Uwe's wife.

== Nominations table ==
	Day 8	Day 11	Day 13	Day 15	Day 17		Day 20		Day 21	Day 22	Day 23		Day 24 Final		Nominations received
	Day 8	Day 11	Day 13	Day 15	Round 1	Round 2	Round 1	Round 2	Day 21	Day 22	Round 1	Round 2	Day 24 Final		Nominations received
Melanie	No; Nominations	Rafi, Ina	Pascal	Uwe	Ina	Ina, Uwe	Marie	Ina	Not eligible	Uwe	Ina	Marie, Uwe	Winner (Day 24)		7
Uwe	No; Nominations	Ina, Daniela	Ina	Daniela	Payton	Not eligible	Marie	Danny	Danny	Nominated	Marie	Marie	Runner-up (Day 24)		19
Danny	No; Nominations	Not eligible	Gitta	Uwe	Uwe	Uwe, Gitta	Paco	Paco	Not eligible	Ina	Ina	Uwe	Third place (Day 24)		3
Papis	No; Nominations	Not eligible	Ina	Babs	Payton	Not eligible	Eric	Marie	Eric	Daniela	Melanie	Uwe	Fourth place (Day 24)		3
Marie	No; Nominations	Not eligible	Melanie	Uwe	Payton	Not eligible	Paco	Paco	Not eligible	Daniela	Papis	Papis	Evicted (Day 23)		8
Ina	No; Nominations	Paco, Melanie	Paco	Uwe	Paco	Not eligible	Melanie	Melanie	Danny	Melanie	Melanie	Evicted (Day 23)			13
Daniela	No; Nominations	Gitta, Rafi	Pascal	Babs	Uwe	Nominated	Paco	Marie	Marie	Papis	Evicted (Day 22)				8
Eric	No; Nominations	Not eligible	Gitta	Gitta	Jörg	Not eligible	Paco	Paco	Not eligible	Evicted (Day 22)					4
Paco	No; Nominations	Rafi, Ina	Babs	Babs	Uwe	Uwe, Ina	Daniela	Daniela	Evicted (Day 21)						12
Jörg	No; Nominations	Not eligible	Ina	Eric	Uwe	Gitta, Eric	Daniela	Evicted (Day 20)							1
Gitta	No; Nominations	Not eligible	Babs	Babs	Uwe	Not eligible	Evicted (Day 17)								6
Payton	No; Nominations	Not eligible	Pascal	Uwe	Uwe	Evicted (Day 17)									3
Babs	Not in House	Not eligible	Paco	Daniela	Evicted (Day 15)										6
Pascal	Not in House	Not eligible	Paco	Evicted (Day 13)											3
Rafi	No; Nominations	Not eligible	Evicted (Day 11)												3
Mimi	No; Nominations	Walked (Day 10)													0
Heike	No; Nominations	Evicted (Day 8)													0
Daniel	Walked (Day 4)														0
Notes	1	2	3	4	5	6	7	none	8	9, 10	9	9, 11	none		
Against public vote	All; Housemates	Daniela, Gitta, Ina, ~~Melanie,~~; Paco, Rafi	Ina, Paco, Pascal	Babs, Danny, Ina, Uwe	Payton, Uwe	Daniela, Gitta, Ina, Uwe	Daniela, Danny, Ina, Jörg, Marie, Paco, Uwe	Marie, Paco	Danny, Eric, Marie	Daniela, Ina, Papis, Uwe	Ina, Melanie	Uwe, Marie	Danny, Melanie, Papis, Uwe		
Walked	Daniel	Mimi	none												
Evicted	Heike; Fewest votes to save	Rafi; Fewest votes to save	Pascal; Fewest votes to save	Babs; Fewest votes to save	Payton; Fewest votes to save	Gitta; Fewest votes to save	Jörg; Fewest votes to save	Paco; Fewest votes to save	Eric; Fewest votes to save	Daniela; Fewest votes to save	Ina; Fewest votes to save	Marie; Fewest votes to save	Papis; Fewest votes (out of 4)	Danny; Fewest votes (out of 3)	
Evicted	Heike; Fewest votes to save	Rafi; Fewest votes to save	Pascal; Fewest votes to save	Babs; Fewest votes to save	Payton; Fewest votes to save	Gitta; Fewest votes to save	Jörg; Fewest votes to save	Paco; Fewest votes to save	Eric; Fewest votes to save	Daniela; Fewest votes to save	Ina; Fewest votes to save	Marie; Fewest votes to save	Uwe; Fewest votes (out of 2)	Melanie; Most votes (out of 2)	

=== Notes ===
- ^Note 1 : There were no nominations this round. Instead, the viewers voted for their favourite housemate. The housemate with the fewest votes was evicted. The voting lines were opened on Day 6.
- ^Note 2 : For this round, only five housemates were eligible to nominate. The nominating housemates were chosen by the viewers. Each nominating housemate must name two nominees, instead of one. After the nominations, the nominated housemates competed in a duel to earn safety from the public vote. Melanie won this duel, thus no longer faced the public vote.
- ^Note 3 : Danny, Eric, Marie, Papis, Payton and Uwe were immune from nominations after the duels on Days 12 and 13.
- ^Note 4 : Before the nominations, Daniela, Danny, Payton and Uwe won the power the select an envelope each containing either a killer nomination card or an immunity card. They can use them for themselves or pass it on to another housemate. Danny got the killer nomination card and used it for himself, while Uwe also got the same card, but passed it on to Ina. Payton got the immunity card and used it for herself, while Daniela also got the same card, but passed it on to Paco. This round of nominations was made face-to-face.
- ^Note 5 : After the first duel, Eric, Ina, Papis and Payton had the power to choose one person from their team to be immune from this round of nominations. They chose Eric.
- ^Note 6 : Before the nominations, the losers of the duel, Daniela, Gitta, Marie and Uwe, had to choose one person from their team to automatically be nominated for this round of nominations. They chose Daniela. As the winners of the duel, only Danny, Jörg, Melanie and Paco were able to nominate. Each nominating housemate must name two nominees, instead of one.
- ^Note 7 : For this round, the most popular housemate in a popularity poll, Papis, was immune from this nominations. The least popular housemates, Danny, Ina, Jörg and Uwe were automatically nominated.
- ^Note 8 : All housemates in the Big Planet were immune after Papis and Ina's win in the duel. In addition, they were also eligible to nominate.
- ^Note 9 : As the result of the duels on Day 22, Danny won a final ticket, granting him immunity from nominations until the finale.
- ^Note 10 : This round of nominations was made face-to-face. Uwe nominated himself for this eviction, which is against the rules. As a result, he was automatically put up for eviction by Big Brother.
- ^Note 11 : As the winner of the day's duel, Melanie had a choice to either nominate two housemates for eviction or nominate only one housemate, but with double points for that nomination. She chose to nominate two housemates for eviction.

== Ratings ==
Week	Episode	Air date	Timeslot	Viewers (in millions)		Share (in %)	
Week	Episode	Air date	Timeslot	Total	14-49 Years	Total	14-49 Years
1	1	6 August 2021	Friday 8:15 p.m.	1.60	0.67	8.0	14.3
1	2	7 August 2021	Saturday 10:20 p.m.	1.18	0.50	6.5	11.0
1	3	8 August 2021	Sunday 10:20 p.m.	1.29	0.49	8.1	12.2
1	4	9 August 2021	Monday 8:15 p.m.	1.49	0.66	6.1	11.2
1	5	10 August 2021	Tuesday 10:20 p.m.	1.28	0.45	8.2	10.6
1	6	11 August 2021	Wednesday 8:15 p.m.	1.26	0.43	5.7	8.1
1	7	12 August 2021	Thursday 10:20 p.m.	1.26	0.44	8.6	11.0
1	8	13 August 2021	Friday 11:00 p.m.	1.25	0.45	10.2	13.3
2	9	14 August 2021	Saturday 8:15 p.m.	1.12	0.46	5.5	10.5
2	10	15 August 2021	Sunday 10:15 p.m.	1.00	0.43	6.0	9.4
2	11	16 August 2021	Monday 8:15 p.m.	1.23	0.52	5.2	9.2
2	12	17 August 2021	Tuesday 11:15 p.m.	0.96	0.31	9.5	11.2
2	13	18 August 2021	Wednesday 8:15 p.m.	1.28	0.44	5.4	7.6
2	14	19 August 2021	Thursday 10:15 p.m.	1.05	0.34	7.4	9.1
2	15	20 August 2021	Friday 8:15 p.m.	1.22	0.45	5.8	9.3
3	16	21 August 2021	Saturday 10:15 p.m.	1.14	0.46	6.8	10.4
3	17	22 August 2021	Sunday 10:15 p.m.	1.16	0.50	7.6	12.2
3	18	23 August 2021	Monday 8:15 p.m.	1.37	0.59	5.8	10.2
3	19	24 August 2021	Tuesday 8:15 p.m.	1.23	0.44	4.9	7.5
3	20	25 August 2021	Wednesday 8:15 p.m.	1.27	0.45	5.2	7.6
3	21	26 August 2021	Thursday 8:15 p.m.	1.34	0.45	5.3	7.2
3	22	27 August 2021	Friday 8:15 p.m.	1.48	0.54	7.1	10.6
