= Promi Big Brother season 13 =

Season of Promi Big Brother

Promi Big Brother
- Season 13
- Presented by: Jochen Schropp; Marlene Lufen
- No. of days: 17
- No. of housemates: 15
- Winner: Jimi Blue Ochsenknecht
- Runner-up: Harald Glööckler
- Companion show: Die Late Night Show

Release
- Original network: Sat.1
- Original release: 6 October – 20 October 2025

Additional information
- Filming dates: 4 October – 20 October 2025

Season chronology
- ← Previous; Season 12 Next → Season 14

Promi Big Brother 2025, also known as Promi Big Brother 13, is the thirteenth season of the German reality television series Promi Big Brother. The show will begin airing on 6 October 2025 on Sat.1, with the 24/7 live feed returning two days earlier on the streaming platform Joyn. It is the thirteenth celebrity season and the fifteenth season of the Big Brother franchise to air on Sat.1 to date. Jochen Schropp and Marlene Lufen both returned as hosts of the show.

== Spin-off shows ==
=== Die Late Night Show ===
The live late-night show with the name Die Late Night Show will return air every day after the main show on Sat.1. Jochen Bendel and Melissa Khalaj will return as hosts of the late-night show. Special guests joined the presenter duo to analyze the situation of the show, and it also features exclusive live broadcasts from the house.

== Housemates ==
Celebrity	Age on entry	Notability	Day entered	Day exited	Status
Jimi Blue Ochsenknecht	33	Actor	3	17	Winner
Harald Glööckler	60	Fashion designer	1	17	Runner-up
Michael Naseband	60	Scripted crime series actor	1	17	3rd place
Laura Blond	29	Reality TV personality, Influencer	1	17	4th place
Erik Seidl	26	Content creator	1	17	5th place
Andrej Mangold	38	Reality TV personality, Influencer	1; 16	15; 17	6th place
Karina Kipp	47	Content creator	1	16	Evicted
Achim Petry	51	Schlager singer	1	16	Evicted
Désirée Nick	69	Reality TV personality, actress	1	14	Evicted
Paco Herb	29	Reality TV personality	1	13	Evicted
Sarah-Jane Wollny	26	Reality TV personality	1	12	Evicted
Marc Terenzi	47	Singer	1	11	Evicted
Pinar Sevim	35	Reality TV personality	1	10	Evicted
Christina Dimitriou	33	Reality TV personality	1	10	Evicted
Doreen Dietel	52	Actress	1	9	Evicted

== Apartment & Shell ==
	Week 1						Week 2					Week 3
	Day 1–2	Day 3	Day 4	Day 5	Day 6	Day 7	Day 8–9	Day 10	Day 11	Day 12	Day 13	Day 14–17
Jimi Blue		Shell				Apartment	Shell				Apartment	Shell
Harald	Apartment		Shell								Apartment	Shell
Michael	Shell		Apartment		Shell							
Laura	Shell		Apartment	Shell					Apartment	Shell		
Erik	Shell							Apartment	Shell			
Andrej	Shell							Apartment	Shell	Apartment		Shell
Karina	Shell						Apartment	Shell	Apartment	Shell		
Achim	Shell										Apartment	Shell
Désirée	Apartment		Shell						Apartment	Shell		
Paco	Shell				Apartment		Shell			Apartment	Shell	
Sarah-Jane	Shell						Apartment	Shell	Apartment	Shell		
Marc	Shell							Apartment	Shell			
Pinar	Shell				Apartment		Shell					
Christina	Shell			Apartment		Shell						
Doreen	Shell						Apartment					

== Nominations table ==
	Round 1						Day 10		Day 11	Day 12	Day 13	Day 14	Day 15	Day 16		Day 17					Nominations received
	Day 4	Day 5	Day 6	Day 7	Day 8	Day 9	Day 10		Day 11	Day 12	Day 13	Day 14	Day 15	Day 16		Round 1	Round 2	Round 3	Round 4		Nominations received
Construction Manager(s)	Karina	Sarah-Jane	Désirée	Harald	Marc	Jimi Blue	Achim		Paco	Andrej; Karina	Erik; Laura	Harald	Jimi Blue			none					
Jimi Blue	Désirée	Not eligible	Not eligible	Not eligible	Harald	Laura	Nominated	In; Shell	Not eligible	Competition lost	Not eligible	Erik	Laura	Nominated	Michael	Nominated	Saved	Saved	Winner (Day 17)		0
Harald	Christina	Not eligible	Not eligible	Not eligible	Not eligible	Nominated	Nominated	In; Shell	Not eligible	Competition won	Not eligible	Nominated	Michael	Nominated	Karina	Nominated	Saved	Nominated	Runner-up (Day 17)		7
Michael	Immune	Not eligible	Not eligible	Not eligible	Harald	Nominated	Nominated	In; Shell	Not eligible	Competition won	Not eligible	Laura	Andrej	Nominated	Andrej	Nominated	Nominated	Saved	Third place (Day 17)		7
Laura	Immune	Not eligible	Not eligible	Michael	Achim	Achim	Nominated	In; Shell	Paco	Competition won	Désirée, Karina, Michael, Paco	Saved	Erik	Nominated	Erik	Nominated	Saved	Nominated	Fourth place (Day 17)		7
Erik	Désirée	Not eligible	Nominated	Not eligible	Harald	Nominated	Nominated	In; Apartment	Not eligible	Competition lost	Désirée, Karina, Michael, Paco	Michael	Laura	Nominated	Laura	Nominated	Nominated	Fifth place (Day 17)			4
Andrej	Achim	Not eligible	Not eligible	Not eligible	Achim	Achim	Nominated	In; Apartment	Not eligible	Competition won	Not eligible	Jimi Blue	Michael	Nominated	Michael	Nominated	Sixth place (Day 17)				3
Karina	Désirée	Not eligible	Nominated	Michael	In; Apartment	Nominated	Nominated	In; Shell	Marc	Construction; Manager	Not eligible	Andrej	Harald	Nominated	Laura	Evicted (Day 16)					2
Achim	Not eligible	Not eligible	Not eligible	Not eligible	Not eligible	Andrej	Nominated	Erik; Andrej; Marc (to save)	Not eligible	Competition lost	Not eligible	Karina	Laura	Nominated	Evicted (Day 16)						10
Désirée	Doreen	Erik	Nominated	Michael	Achim	Nominated	Nominated	In; Shell	Erik	Competition lost	Not eligible	Nominated	Evicted (Day 14)								4
Paco	Not eligible	Not eligible	Doreen	Not eligible	Harald	Laura	Nominated	In; Shell	Not eligible	Competition won	Not eligible	Evicted (Day 13)									3
Sarah-Jane	Paco	Not eligible	Not eligible	Michael	In; Apartment	In; Apartment	Nominated	In; Shell	Michael	Competition lost	Evicted (Day 12)										0
Marc	Not eligible	Not eligible	Not eligible	Not eligible	Harald	Achim	Nominated	In; Apartment	Not eligible	Evicted (Day 11)											1
Pinar	Not eligible	Not eligible	Doreen	Michael	Harald	Achim	Nominated	In; Shell	Evicted (Day 10)												0
Christina	Not eligible	Immune	Doreen	Michael	Achim	Achim	Nominated	Evicted (Day 10)													2
Doreen	Christina	Not eligible	Not eligible	Michael	Not eligible	Nominated	Evicted (Day 9)														2
Notes	1	2	3	4	5	6	7	8	9	10	11	12	13	7	none	7	14		15		
Nominated	Achim, Désirée, Doreen, Erik, Harald, Karina, Michael						All housemates	Achim, Désirée, Harald, Jimi Blue, Karina, Laura, Michael, Paco, Pinar, Sarah-Jane	Erik, Marc, Michael, Paco	Achim, Désirée, Erik, Jimi Blue, Sarah-Jane	Désirée, Karina, Michael, Paco	Désirée, Harald	Andrej, Erik, Harald, Laura, Michael	All housemates	Andrej, Erik, Karina, Laura, Michael	All housemates	Erik, Michael	Harald, Laura	Harald, Jimi Blue, Michael		
Evicted	Doreen; 4,15% to save						Christina; 30,48% to save (out of 3)	Pinar; 4,14% to save	Marc; 39,51% to save (out of 2)	Sarah-Jane; 35,06% to save (out of 2)	Paco; 39,18% to save (out of 2)	Désirée; 38,32% to save	Eviction cancelled	Achim; 6,51% to save	Karina; 15,40% to save	Andrej; Fewest votes to save	Erik; Fewest votes to save	Laura; Fewest votes to save	Michael; Fewest votes (out of 3) to win	Harald; 45.09% (out of 2) to win	
Evicted	Doreen; 4,15% to save						Christina; 30,48% to save (out of 3)	Pinar; 4,14% to save	Marc; 39,51% to save (out of 2)	Sarah-Jane; 35,06% to save (out of 2)	Paco; 39,18% to save (out of 2)	Désirée; 38,32% to save	Eviction cancelled	Achim; 6,51% to save	Karina; 15,40% to save	Andrej; Fewest votes to save	Erik; Fewest votes to save	Laura; Fewest votes to save	Jimi Blue; 54.91% (out of 2) to win		

=== Notes ===
- ^Note 1: Housemates living in the Show Apartment cannot be nominated or nominate, therefore Laura and Michael were exempt from this round 1. Furthermore, all housemates competing in the budget competitions were not eligible to nominate.
- ^Note 2: Désirée, as the only nominated housemate by that point, was allowed to issue a killer nomination. She chose Erik. Furthermore, Karina opted to put herself up for the public vote in exchange for more shopping budget.
- ^Note 3: Housemates in the Apartment had to nominate one person from the Shell not yet nominated. Christian, Paco, & Pinar chose Doreen.
- ^Note 4: The female housemates had nominated a male housemate not nominated yet. They chose Michael.
- ^Note 5: The Construction Manager, Marc, had to choose 2 people, not yet nominated, from the Shell for a house vote. He chose Achim & Harald.
- ^Note 6: Non-nominated housemates nominated face-to-face. Sarah-Jane was immune as she live in the Apartment.
- ^Note 7: All housemates automatically faced eviction.
- ^Note 8: Achim, as Construction Manager, had to name 3 people to live in the Shell and therefore were safe from the public vote. He could choose himself, however, he chose Andrej, Erik, & Marc.
- ^Note 9: The remaining female housemates had to killer nominate a male housemate each.
- ^Note 10: Karina, as Construction Manager, had to select 2 teams to face each other in a competition for immunity. As Construction Manager, she again immunity herself. As Erik & Sarah-Jane lost the competition, they face the public vote alongside Achim, Désirée & Jimi Blue.
- ^Note 11: As joint Construction Managers, Erik & Laura had to nominate one housemate each from one of the following pairs: Achim & Karina, Andrej & Paco, Désirée & Harald, Jimi Blue & Michael.
- ^Note 12: Housemates saved each other in a chain format with the last 2 remaining housemates facing the public vote.
- ^Note 13: Housemates nominated face-to-face. As a result from the nominations, Andrej was ultimately evicted in the public vote. However, Big Brother detected irregularities with his voting lines and therefore he rejoined the game the next day.
- ^Note 14: The final five housemates competed in two final duels. The 2 housemates from each duel that finishes last were nominated for eviction.
- ^Note 15: The public voted for the winner of Promi Big Brother
