= Promi Big Brother season 12 =

Season of Promi Big Brother

Promi Big Brother
- Season 12
- Presented by: Jochen Schropp; Marlene Lufen
- No. of days: 17
- No. of housemates: 14
- Winner: Leyla Lahouar
- Runner-up: Jochen Horst
- Companion show: Die Late Night Show

Release
- Original network: Sat.1
- Original release: 7 October – 21 October 2024

Additional information
- Filming dates: 5 October – 21 October 2024

Season chronology
- ← Previous; Season 11 Next → Season 13

Promi Big Brother 2024, also known as Promi Big Brother 12, is the twelfth season of the German reality television series Promi Big Brother. The show began airing on 7 October 2024 on Sat.1, with the 24/7 live feed returning two days earlier on the streaming platform Joyn. It is the twelfth celebrity season and the fourteenth season of Big Brother franchise to air on Sat.1 to date. Jochen Schropp and Marlene Lufen both returned as hosts of the show.

== Spin-off shows ==
=== Die Late Night Show ===
The live late-night show with the name Die Late Night Show will return air every day after the main show on Sat.1. Jochen Bendel and Melissa Khalaj will return as hosts of the late-night show. Special guests joined the presenter duo to analyze the situation of the show and it also features exclusive live broadcasts from the house.

== Housemates ==
Celebrity	Age on entry	Notability	Day entered	Day exited	Status
Leyla Lahouar	28	Reality TV personality, Der Bachelor 2023 participant	1	17	Winner
Jochen Horst	63	Actor	1	17	Runner-up
Matthias Höhn	28	Actor, content creator	1	17	3rd place
Alida Kurras	47	TV presenter, Big Brother 2 winner	1	17	4th place
Mike Heiter	32	Reality TV personality, Love Island 1 participant	1	17	5th place
Max Kruse	36	Football player	1	16	Evicted
Mimi Fiedler	49	Actress	1	15	Evicted
Sarah Wagner	28	Influencer, TikTok streamer	3	15	Evicted
Elena Miras	32	Reality TV personality, Love Island 1 winner	3	14	Walked
Daniel Lopes	47	Singer, Deutschland sucht den Superstar 1 participant	1	13	Evicted
Cecilia Asoro	28	Reality TV personality, Der Bachelor 2019 participant	1	12	Evicted
Sinan Movez	19	Influencer, TikTok streamer	1	11	Evicted
Bea Peters	42	Celebrity reporter	1	10	Evicted
Verena Kerth	43	TV and radio presenter	1	10	Evicted

== Nominations table ==
	Round 1							Day 10	Day 11	Day 12	Day 13	Day 14	Day 15	Day 16	Day 17				Nominations received
	Day 3	Day 4	Day 5	Day 6	Day 7	Day 8	Day 9	Day 10	Day 11	Day 12	Day 13	Day 14	Day 15	Day 16	Round 1	Round 2	Round 3		Nominations received
Container Boss	Matthias	Leyla	Mike	Elena	Sarah	Max	Mimi	Cecilia	Alida	Leyla	Mike	Max	Matthias	Leyla	none				
Leyla	Not eligible	Not eligible	Nominated					Alida	Jochen	Not eligible	Elena	Sarah	Mimi	Alida	Nominated	Saved	Winner (Day 17)		0
Jochen	Not eligible	Not eligible	Not eligible	Sarah to nominate	Mimi to save	Daniel to save	Nominated	Daniel	Not eligible	Sarah	Max	Mimi	Matthias	Mike	Saved	Saved	Runner-up (Day 17)		5
Matthias	Not eligible	Max to nominate	Not eligible	Not eligible	Not eligible	Nominated		Cecilia	Not eligible	Mimi	Elena	Jochen	Alida	Alida	Saved	Nominated	Third place (Day 17)		2
Alida	Not eligible	Not eligible	Exempt					Nominated	Sinan	Not eligible	Elena	Sarah	Matthias	Max	Saved	Nominated	Fourth place (Day 17)		5
Mike	Not eligible	Not eligible	Not eligible	Exempt				Daniel	Not eligible	Cecilia	Sarah	Jochen	Mimi	Alida	Nominated	Fifth place (Day 17)			2
Max	Not eligible	Nominated						Alida	Not eligible	Elena	Elena	Mimi	Mimi	Alida	Evicted (Day 16)				4
Mimi	Not eligible	Not eligible	Leyla to nominate	Mike to save	Exempt			Alida	Sinan	Not eligible	Max	Max	Mike	Evicted (Day 15)					5
Sarah	Not in House	Elena to save	Not eligible	Nominated				Cecilia	Jochen	Not eligible	Daniel	Jochen	Evicted (Day 15)						4
Elena	Not in House	Exempt						Cecilia	Sinan	Not eligible	Daniel	Walked (Day 14)							7
Daniel	Bea to save	Not eligible	Not eligible	Not eligible	Verena to nominate	Exempt		Nominated	Not eligible	Elena	Elena	Evicted (Day 13)							2
Cecilia	Sinan to nominate	Not eligible	Not eligible	Not eligible	Not eligible	Matthias to nominate	Exempt	Cecilia	Sinan	Not eligible	Evicted (Day 12)								1
Sinan	Nominated						Exempt	Nominated	Not eligible	Evicted (Day 11)									4
Bea	Exempt							Nominated	Evicted (Day 10)										N/A
Verena	Not eligible	Not eligible	Alida to save	Sarah to nominate	Nominated			Evicted (Day 10)											N/A
Notes	1							2	3	4	5, 6, 7	6, 8, 9	6	6, 7	10		11		
Nominated	Jochen, Leyla, Matthias, Max, Sarah, ~~Sinan~~, Verena							Alida, Bea, ~~Daniel~~, ~~Sinan~~	Jochen, Sarah, Sinan	Cecilia, Elena, Jochen, Mimi, Sarah	Daniel, Elena, Leyla, Max, Mimi	Jochen, Leyla, Mimi, Sarah	Jochen, Matthias, Mimi	Alida, Jochen, Max, Mike	Leyla, Mike	Alida, Matthias	Jochen, Leyla, Matthias		
Walked	none											Elena	none						
Evicted	Verena; Fewest votes to save							Bea; Fewest votes to save	Sinan; Fewest votes to save	Cecilia; Fewest votes to save	Daniel; Fewest votes to save	Sarah; Fewest votes (out of 2) to save	Mimi; Fewest votes to save	Max; Fewest votes to save	Mike; Fewest votes to save	Alida; Fewest votes to save	Matthias; Fewest votes (out of 3) to win	Jochen; 26.46% (out of 2) to win	
Evicted	Verena; Fewest votes to save							Bea; Fewest votes to save	Sinan; Fewest votes to save	Cecilia; Fewest votes to save	Daniel; Fewest votes to save	Sarah; Fewest votes (out of 2) to save	Mimi; Fewest votes to save	Max; Fewest votes to save	Mike; Fewest votes to save	Alida; Fewest votes to save	Leyla; 73.54% (out of 2) to win		

=== Notes ===
- ^Note 1: The first round of nominations were held over 7 days. The Container boss decided which 4 Housemates would enter the arena. Those who enter the arena competed in pairs. The winning pair decided who would be amongst them would be safe from eviction. The losing pair decided who to nominate. They could nominate themselves or a housemate of their choosing who isn't immune. On Day 9, Elena won a challenge and saved one of the nominees, she chose Sinan.
- ^Note 2: Following Verena's eviction, the public voted for their favorite Housemate. The 5 housemates with the fewest votes would face eviction. Those Housesmates were Ailda, Bea, Cecilia, Daniel & Sinan. The saved housemates then voted to save one of the nominees. Ailda & Cecilia were tied with 3 votes. As the Container Boss, Cecilia had the tie breaking vote. She chose to save herself & therefore was safe from eviction. Those who weren't safe competed in a duel in pairs. Ailda did not compete in this duel on medical grounds. She chose Cecilia to represent her. The pairs were Bea & Cecilia and Daniel & Sinan. Daniel & Sinan won the duel and therefore were safe from eviction.
- ^Note 3: In this round of nominations, only female housemates could nominate. However 2 female housemates selected by the Container Boss would competed in a duel. The winner would be safe from eviction, while the loser would be automatically nominated.
- ^Note 4: In this round of nominations, only male housemates could nominate. However 2 male housemates selected by the Container Boss would competed in a duel. The winner would be safe from eviction, while the loser would be automatically nominated.
- ^Note 5: Big Brother offered Jochen to either shop or nominate. In return if he nominates, he would be safe from eviction. He chose to nominate Leyla & therefore was safe from eviction.
- ^Note 6: 2 housemates selected by the Container Boss would compete in a duel. The winner would be safe from eviction, while the loser was automatically nominated.
- ^Note 7: In this round of nominations, Housemates nominated face to face.
- ^Note 8: On the morning of Day 14, Elena left the house on medical grounds and did not return.
- ^Note 9: Big Brother offered Matthias to either shop or nominate. In return if he nominates, he would be safe from eviction. He chose shop.
- ^Note 10: The final five Housemates competed in two final duels. The 2 housemates from each duel that finishes last were nominated for eviction
- ^Note 11: The public voted for the winner of Promi Big Brother.
