= Promi Big Brother =

German television program

- The eye logo since season 7.
- Genre: Reality
- Created by: John de Mol Jr.
- Presented by: Oliver Pocher; Cindy aus Marzahn; Jochen Schropp; Jochen Bendel; Marlene Lufen
- Country of origin: Germany
- Original language: German
- No. of seasons: 12
- No. of episodes: approx. 170

Production
- Running time: 50–211 minutes

Original release
- Network: Sat.1
- Release: 13 September 2013 – present

Related
- Big Brother

Promi Big Brother is a German television reality show based on the Dutch show Big Brother, created by producer John de Mol Jr. in 1997, which is airing from 2013. The show followed a number of celebrity contestants, known as Promis (lit. Celebrities), who were isolated from the outside world for an extended period of time in a custom-built Set. In Season 1–7, after the second week, every day, one of the housemates was evicted by a public vote, with the last housemate, named the winner. For the first time, season 8 of Promi Big Brother aired for three weeks.

Promi Big Brother began as a spin-off series to the original Big Brother Germany, and premiered on Sat.1 on 13 September 2013.

Comedian Cindy aus Marzahn and television presenter and Comedian Oliver Pocher hosted the first season. Jochen Schropp has hosted the show since the second season. The fifth season was hosted by Schropp and Jochen Bendel. From the sixth season onward, the show has been hosted by Schropp and Marlene Lufen.

== Format ==
The eye logo used from seasons 1 until 6.

Promi Big Brother follows in his conception the basic idea of Big Brother. For a given period of time, several people live in a television studio set up as a living environment, the so-called "container". The daily routine is structured by the production company, which appears as the computer voice "Big Brother". Competitions are held or assignments are given to the participants of the show.

The lives of the participants, who are referred to as "celebrities" in the program and in the title, are recorded around the clock by television cameras and microphones and broadcast live in the form of live broadcasts or as a compilation.

=== Prize money ===
The winner of Promi Big Brother receives a cash prize for being the last remaining housemate.

- In Promi Big Brother 1, the winner didn't receive a cash prize.
- From Promi Big Brother 2, the winner receives €100,000.

=== Distribution of participants ===
Designations of the areas
Season	Luxurious Area	Medium Area	Poor Area
1	No division		
2	Above (House)	n/a	Below (Basement)
3	Above (House)	n/a	Below (Basement)
4	House	n/a	Sewerage
5	Everything	n/a	Nothing
6	Villa	n/a	Construction Site
7	Luxury Camp	n/a	Tent Camp
8	Fairy Tale Castle	n/a	Fairy Tale Forest
9	Big Planet	n/a	Space Station
10	Loft	Garage	Attic
11	No division		
12	No division		
13	Apartment	n/a	Shell
14	House	n/a	Garden

Since the second season, the participants are divided into two different areas: In addition to a luxurious area, there is an area in which the participants live in poor conditions. The distribution of the participants can be changed by spectator ratings, arbitrary stage directions or since the third season also due to the outcome of duels.

In seasons 2 to 4 attention was paid to an even distribution of the participants (per area six people). Since the fifth season, there is often an uneven distribution. For example, on the second day of the sixth season, three participants lived in the luxurious area, while the other nine participants had to live in the poor area.

Since the fifth season, both areas are on one level. In the previous three seasons, there were two levels.

In season 10, participants were divided into three areas.

In season 11–12, there was no division, as the house reverted back to a container for the first time since Big Brother 1 as part of the back to basics theme.

=== Nomination and voting ===
Since the second season, participants have nominated one other participant each day from the second live show to leave the house or show. Afterward, the audience selects by televoting a participant from the nomination list, which should remain in the house or in the show. The one who has received the least audience votes must leave. If a housemate voluntarily leaves the house (or for other reasons), the eviction will expire on the appropriate number of days. After two weeks, there will be the finale at the end of the season, in which four of the last five remaining participants fall out. The last one remaining is the winner of the season.

In the first season, the one who got the most audience votes had to leave.

=== Theme ===
Some seasons include a theme.

Season	Theme
1	none
2	The Experiment
3	none
4	none
5	All or Nothing
6	none
7	none
8	none
9	none
10	none
11	Back to Basics
12	Back to Basics
13	none
14	none

== Series details and viewership ==
Series	Days	Housemates	Winner	Runner-up	Episodes	Originally released			Average viewers (millions)
Series	Days	Housemates	Winner	Runner-up	Episodes	First released	Last released	Network	Average viewers (millions)
1	15	13	Jenny Elvers	Natalia Osada	15	13 September 2013	27 September 2013	Sat.1	2.04
2	17	12	Aaron Troschke	Claudia Effenberg	15	15 August 2014	29 August 2014	Sat.1	2.92
3	17	12	David Odonkor	Menowin Fröhlich	15	14 August 2015	28 August 2015	Sat.1	2.37
4	17	13	Ben Tewaag	Cathy Lugner	15	2 September 2016	16 September 2016	Sat.1	2.00
5	17	12	Jens Hilbert	Milo Moiré	15	11 August 2017	25 August 2017	Sat.1	1.86
6	17	13	Silvia Wollny	Chethrin Schulze	15	17 August 2018	31 August 2018	Sat.1	2.09
7	17	12	Janine Meissner	Joey Heindle	15	9 August 2019	23 August 2019	Sat.1	2.01
8	24	18	Werner Hansch	Mischa Mayer	22	7 August 2020	28 August 2020	Sat.1	1.67
9	24	18	Melanie Müller	Uwe Abel	22	6 August 2021	27 August 2021	Sat.1	1.25
10	22	16	Rainer Gottwald	Micaela Schäfer	20	18 November 2022	7 December 2022	Sat.1	1.28
11	17	13	Yeliz Koc	Marco Strecker	15	20 November 2023	4 December 2023	Sat.1	1.52
12	17	14	Leyla Lahouar	Jochen Horst	15	7 October 2024	21 October 2024	Sat.1	1.05
13	17	15	Jimi Blue Ochsenknecht	Harald Glööckler	15	6 October 2025	20 October 2025	Sat.1	1.13
14	15	14	Maurice Dziwak	Axel Schulz	15	5 October 2026	19 October 2026	Sat.1	1.06

== Broadcasting ==
Season	Week	Friday	Saturday	Sunday	Monday	Tuesday	Wednesday	Thursday
1	Week 1	Highlights Shows (8:15pm–11:15pm)	Highlights Shows (10:15pm–11:15pm)					
1	Week 2	The Decision Shows (8:15pm–11:15pm)	The Decision Shows (10:15pm–11:15pm)					
2	Week 1	Highlights Shows (8:15pm–11:15pm)	Highlights Shows (10:15pm–11:15pm)					
2	Week 2	The Decision Shows (8:15pm–11:15pm)	The Decision Shows (10:15pm–11:15pm)					
3	Week 1	Highlights Shows (8:15pm–11:45pm)	Highlights Shows (10:15pm–11:45pm)					
3	Week 2	The Decision Shows (8:15pm–11:45pm)	The Decision Shows (10:15pm–11:45pm)					
4	Week 1	Highlights Shows (8:15pm–12:00am)	Highlights Shows (10:15pm–12:00am)					
4	Week 2	The Decision Shows (8:15pm–12:00am)	The Decision Shows (10:15pm–12:00am)					
5	Week 1	Highlights Shows (8:15pm–11:30pm)	Highlights Shows (10:15pm–11:30pm)					
5	Week 2	The Decision Shows (10:15pm–11:30pm)						
6	Week 1	Highlights Shows (8:15pm–11:30pm)	Highlights Shows (10:15pm–11:30pm)					
6	Week 2	The Decision Shows (8:15pm–12:00am)	The Decision Shows (10:15pm–12:00am)					
7	Week 1	Highlights Shows (8:15pm–12:15am)	Highlights Shows (10:15pm–12:00am)					
7	Week 2	The Decision Shows (8:15pm–11:45pm)	The Decision Shows (10:15pm–11:45pm)					
8	Week 1 & 2	The Decision Shows (8:15pm–11:30pm)	Highlights Shows (10:15pm–11:45pm)		The Decision Shows (8:15pm–11:30pm)	Highlights Shows (10:15pm–11:45pm)		
8	Week 3	The Decision Shows (8:15pm–11:30pm)	The Decision Shows (10:15pm–12:00am)		The Decision Shows (8:15pm–11:30pm)	The Decision Shows (8:15pm–10:30pm)		
9	Week 1	Highlights Shows (8:15pm–11:55pm)	Highlights Shows (10:20pm–11:50pm)		Highlights Shows (8:15pm–11:15pm)	Highlights Shows (10:20pm–11:45pm)	The Decision Shows (8:15pm–11:00pm)	Highlights Shows (10:20pm–11:50pm)
9	Week 2	Highlights Shows (11:00pm–12:30am)	The Decision Shows (8:15pm–11:15pm)	Highlights Shows (10:20pm–11:50pm)	The Decision Shows (8:15pm–11:15pm)	Highlights Shows (11:00pm–12:30am)	The Decision Shows (8:15pm–10:15pm)	Highlights Shows (10:20pm–11:50pm)
9	Week 3	The Decision Shows (8:15pm–11:15pm)	The Decision Shows (10:20pm–11:50pm)		The Decision Shows (8:15pm–11:15pm)	The Decision Shows (8:15pm–10:15pm)		

The finals are broadcast on Fridays at 8:15pm except the Season 10 Finale. This aired because of the ongoing Fifa World Cup Qatar 2022 on a Wednesday Evening at 8.15 p.m

=== Spin-off shows ===
==== Live stream ====
During the first season, there was a live stream during commercial breaks and a 2-hour live stream on Sky Deutschland after the show broadcast on Sat.1. From the second season, a 24-hour live stream from various providers (Season 2: Maxdome, Season 3: Sky Deutschland, Season 4: Bild) was offered. Since the fifth season, no live stream is available. A live stream will return for season 11 on Joyn.

==== Web shows ====
During the first season, the web show was hosted by Etienne Gardé and Nils Bomhoff, and during the second season by Cindy aus Marzahn and Ingo Wohlfeil. For the third and fourth seasons, the web show was hosted by Aaron Troschke alone. The web show during the fifth season was again hosted by Aaron Troschke, but this time with Melissa Khalaj. From the sixth season, Troschke hosted again the web show alone.

Since the seventh season Raffaela "Raffa" Zollo presents the IGTV coverage from the Promi Big Brother Instagram account.

During the sixth season, for the first time, a four-part reality documentary titled Promi Big Brother – Der Tag danach (The day after) is available online.

==== Companion shows ====
During the first season, a weekly evening magazine show titled Promi Big Brother Inside was aired on Sat.1.

Since the second season, a live late-night show with the name Promi Big Brother – Die Late Night Show was airing daily on sixx, until the seventh season, and since the eighth season is airing on Sat.1, throughout the season, hosted by Jochen Bendel and Melissa Khalaj. During the fifth season, the show temporarily stopped because Bendel switched to host the main show.

After the third season, a special episode titled Promi Big Brother – Jetzt wird abgerechnet was aired on Sat.1.

== Presenters ==
Season	Presenter(s)		Sidekicks		Companion show		Web show		
1	Cindy aus Marzahn	Oliver Pocher			Jan Hahn		Etienne Gardé	Nils Bomhoff	
2	Jochen Schropp		Cindy aus Marzahn (Note: Sidekick)		Jochen Bendel	Melissa Khalaj	Cindy aus Marzahn	Ingo Wohlfeil	
3	Jochen Schropp		Cindy aus Marzahn		Jochen Bendel	Melissa Khalaj	Aaron Troschke		
4	Jochen Schropp		Désirée Nick	Aaron Troschke (Note: Social media reporter)	Jochen Bendel	Melissa Khalaj	Aaron Troschke		
5	Jochen Schropp	Jochen Bendel					Aaron Troschke	Melissa Khalaj	
6	Jochen Schropp	Marlene Lufen			Jochen Bendel	Melissa Khalaj	Aaron Troschke		
7	Jochen Schropp	Marlene Lufen			Jochen Bendel	Melissa Khalaj	Aaron Troschke	Raffaela „Raffa“ Zollo	
8	Jochen Schropp	Marlene Lufen			Jochen Bendel	Melissa Khalaj	Aaron Troschke	Raffaela „Raffa“ Zollo	Claudia Obert
9	Jochen Schropp	Marlene Lufen			Jochen Bendel	Melissa Khalaj			
10	Jochen Schropp	Marlene Lufen			Jochen Bendel	Melissa Khalaj			
11	Jochen Schropp	Marlene Lufen			Jochen Bendel	Melissa Khalaj			
12	Jochen Schropp	Marlene Lufen			Jochen Bendel	Melissa Khalaj			
13	Jochen Schropp	Marlene Lufen			Jochen Bendel	Melissa Khalaj			
14	Jochen Schropp	Marlene Lufen			Jochen Bendel				

== Intros ==
Season	Song	Performer	Note
1	"The Signal"	Madcon	Intro
1	"Plastic Faces"	Miss Li	Outro
2	"Sex Love Rock'n'Roll"	Arash feat. T-Pain	Intro & Outro
3	"Come Together"	Echosmith	Intro & Outro
3	"The Hanging Tree"	James Newton Howard feat. Jennifer Lawrence	Duell Intro
4	"Rebellen"	Juno17	Intro & Outro
4	"The Hanging Tree"	James Newton Howard feat. Jennifer Lawrence	Duell Intro
5	"Frei"	Michael Bauereiß	Intro & Outro
5	"The Hanging Tree"	James Newton Howard feat. Jennifer Lawrence	Duell Intro
6	"Alles was ich will"	Brenner	Intro & Outro
6	"The Hanging Tree"	James Newton Howard feat. Jennifer Lawrence	Duell Intro
7	"An guten Tagen"	Johannes Oerding	Intro & Outro
7	"The Hanging Tree"	James Newton Howard feat. Jennifer Lawrence	Match & Duell Intro
8	"Mehr Davon"	Lotte	Intro & Outro
8	"The Hanging Tree"	James Newton Howard feat. Jennifer Lawrence	Match & Duell Intro
9	"The Passenger"	David Hasselhoff	Intro & Outro
9	"The Hanging Tree"	James Newton Howard feat. Jennifer Lawrence	Match & Duell Intro
10	"Es geht um alles"	Herr Wolfschmidt	Intro & Outro
10	"The Hanging Tree"	James Newton Howard feat. Jennifer Lawrence	Match & Duell Intro
11	"Großer Bruder 2K23 (Bewohner Edition)"	Promi Big Brother 11 Housemates	Intro & Outro
11	"The Hanging Tree"	James Newton Howard feat. Jennifer Lawrence	Match & Duell Intro
12	"Großer Bruder 2K24 (Bewohner Edition)"	Promi Big Brother 12 Housemates	Intro & Outro
12	"The Hanging Tree"	James Newton Howard feat. Jennifer Lawrence	Match & Duell Intro
13	"Großer Bruder 2K25 (Bewohner Edition)"	Promi Big Brother 13 Housemates	Intro & Outro
13	"The Hanging Tree"	James Newton Howard feat. Jennifer Lawrence	Match & Duell Intro
14	"Großer Bruder 2K26 (Bewohner Edition)"	Promi Big Brother 14 Housemates	Intro & Outro
14	"The Hanging Tree"	James Newton Howard feat. Jennifer Lawrence	Match & Duell Intro

== See also ==
- List of Promi Big Brother housemates
