= Promi Big Brother season 14 =

Season of Promi Big Brother

Promi Big Brother
- Season 14
- Presented by: Jochen Schropp; Marlene Lufen
- No. of days: 15
- No. of housemates: 14
- Winner: Maurice Dziwak
- Runner-up: Axel Schulz
- Companion show: Die Late Night Show

Release
- Original network: Sat.1
- Original release: 5 October – 19 October 2026

Additional information
- Filming dates: 5 October – 19 October 2026

Season chronology
- ← Previous; Season 13

Promi Big Brother 2026, also known as Promi Big Brother 14, is the fourteenth season of the German reality television series Promi Big Brother. The show will begin airing on 5 October 2026 on Sat.1, with the 24/7 live feed returning on the streaming platform Joyn. It is the fourteenth celebrity season and the fifteenth season of the Big Brother franchise to air on Sat.1 to date. Jochen Schropp and Marlene Lufen both return as hosts of the show.

== Spin-off shows ==
=== Die Late Night Show ===
The live late-night show, titled Die Late Night Show, will return and air every day on Sat.1 following the main show. Jochen Bendel will return as host, while Melissa Khalaj will not return for the new season. Special guests will join Bendel to discuss and analyze the latest events in the house. The show will also feature exclusive live footage from the house.

== Housemates ==
Celebrity	Age on entry	Notability	Day entered	Day exited	Status
Maurice Dziwak	28	Reality TV personality	1	15	Winner
Axel Schulz	57	Former professional boxer	1	15	Runner-up
Gia Georgina Stumpf	37	Podcaster	1	15	3rd place
Nadja Benaissa	44	Singer	1	15	4th place
Francesca Morgese	28	Reality TV personality	1	15	5th place
Gedeon Burkhard	57	Actor	1	14	Evicted
Christian Lell	42	Former professional footballer	1	14	Evicted
Nina Bridney	23	Content creator	1	13	Evicted
Anouschka Renzi	62	Actress	1	12	Evicted
René Redo	57	Gastronomer, Content creator	1	11	Evicted
Nikola Glumac	30	Reality TV personality	1	10	Evicted
Kim Virginia Hartung	31	Reality TV personality	1	9	Evicted
Tessa Bergmeier	37	Model, reality TV personality	1	8	Evicted
Godfrey Egbon	35	Model	1	8	Evicted

== House & Garden ==
	Week 1							Week 2							
	Day 1	Day 2	Day 3	Day 4	Day 5	Day 6	Day 7	Day 8	Day 9	Day 10	Day 11	Day 12	Day 13	Day 14	Day 15
Axel	House	Garden	Garden	Garden	House	Garden	House	House	Garden	Garden	Garden	Garden	Garden	House	House
Francesca	Garden	House	House	House	House	House	Garden	Garden	House	House	House	Garden	Garden	House	House
Gia	Garden	House	House	House	House	House	House	House	Garden	Garden	Garden	Garden	Garden	House	House
Maurice	Garden	House	House	House	House	House	House	House	House	House	House	Garden	Garden	House	House
Nadja	Garden	House	House	House	House	House	House	House	Garden	Garden	Garden	Garden	Garden	House	House
Gedeon	House	Garden	Garden	Garden	Garden	Garden	Garden	Garden	House	House	House	Garden	Garden	House	
Christian	House	Garden	Garden	Garden	Garden	House	House	House	House	Garden	Garden	Garden	Garden		
Nina	House	House	House	House	Garden	Garden	Garden	Garden	Garden	House	House	Garden	Garden		
Anouschka	House	Garden	Garden	House	House	Garden	Garden	Garden	Garden	Garden	Garden	Garden			
René	Garden	House	House	Garden	Garden	Garden	Garden	Garden	House	House	House				
Nikola	Garden	Garden	House	House	House	Garden	Garden	Garden	House	House					
Kim Virginia	Garden	Garden	Garden	Garden	Garden	House	House	House	House						
Tessa	House	House	Garden	Garden	Garden	House	House	House							
Godfrey	House	Garden	Garden	Garden	Garden	Garden	Garden								

== Nominations table ==
	Round 1							Day 8	Day 9	Day 10	Day 11	Day 12	Day 13	Day 14		Day 15				Nominations received
	Day 1	Day 2	Day 3	Day 4	Day 5	Day 6	Day 7	Day 8	Day 9	Day 10	Day 11	Day 12	Day 13	Round 1	Round 2	Round 1	Round 2	Round 3		Nominations received
Head of Garden	Maurice	Axel	Tessa	Kim Virginia	Nina	Nikola	Francesca	Gedeon	Nadja	Gia	Axel	Maurice	Francesca	none						
Maurice	Not eligible	Godfrey	Not eligible	Nikola	Not eligible	Not eligible	Saved	Nominated	Not eligible	Not eligible	Not eligible	Gedeon	Gedeon	Gedeon	Saved	Nominated	Saved	Winner (Day 15)		1
Axel	Not eligible	Not eligible	Not eligible	Not eligible	Not eligible	Not eligible	Saved	Nominated	Lost Challenge	Immune	Not eligible	Nina	Nina	Christian	Nominated	Nominated	Nominated	Runner-up (Day 15)		1
Gia	Not eligible	Godfrey	Not eligible	Anouschka	Not eligible	Anouschka	Immune	Nominated	Lost Challenge	Immune	Not eligible	Gedeon	Gedeon	Axel	Nadja	Nominated	Saved	Third place (Day 15)		1
Nadja	René	Godfrey	Not eligible	Nikola	Not eligible	Anouschka	Immune	Nominated	Lost Challenge	Immune	Not eligible	Gedeon	Gedeon	Christian	Saved	Nominated	Nominated	Fourth place (Day 15)		2
Francesca	Not eligible	Godfrey	Not eligible	Anouschka	Not eligible	Anouschka	Lost; Challenge	Nominated	Gedeon	Not eligible	Not eligible	Anouschka	Gedeon	Christian	Maurice	Nominated	Fifth place (Day 15)			4
Gedeon	Not eligible	Not eligible	Nina	Not eligible	Not eligible	Not eligible	Not eligible	Nominated	Not eligible	Not eligible	Not eligible	Anouschka	Gia	Christian	Nominated	Evicted (Day 14)				16
Christian	Not eligible	Not eligible	Not eligible	Not eligible	Not eligible	Anouschka	Won; Challenge	Nominated	Gedeon	Immune	Gedeon; Francesca; René; Nadja	Francesca	Francesca	Maurice	Evicted (Day 14)					5
Nina	Not eligible	Godfrey	Not eligible	Nikola	Gedeon	Not eligible	Not eligible	Nominated	Gedeon	Not eligible	Not eligible	Anouschka	Gedeon	Evicted (Day 13)						3
Anouschka	Not in House	Not eligible	Not eligible	Nikola	Not eligible	Not eligible	Not eligible	Nominated	Gedeon	Immune	Gedeon; Francesca; René; Nadja	Nadja	Evicted (Day 12)							7
René	Not eligible	Godfrey	Not eligible	Not eligible	Gedeon	Not eligible	Not eligible	Nominated	Gedeon	Francesca, Gedeon	Not eligible	Evicted (Day 11)								2
Nikola	Not in House	Not eligible	Not eligible	Anouschka	Not eligible	Not eligible	Not eligible	Nominated	Gedeon	Francesca, Gedeon	Evicted (Day 10)									4
Kim Virginia	Not in House	Not eligible	Nina	Not eligible	Christian	Not eligible	Won; Challenge	Nominated	Lost Challenge	Evicted (Day 9)										0
Tessa	Not in House	Godfrey	Not eligible	Not eligible	Gedeon	Anouschka	Won; Challenge	Nominated	Evicted (Day 8)											0
Godfrey	Not eligible	Not eligible	Not eligible	Not eligible	Gedeon	Not eligible	Not eligible	Evicted (Day 8)												1
Notes																				
Nominated	Anouschka, Gedeon, Godfrey, Francesca, Nikola, Nina, René							All housemates	Axel, Gedeon, Gia, Kim Virginia, Nadja	Francesca, Gedeon, Nikola, René	Francesca, Gedeon, Nadja, René	Anouschka, Gedeon	Francesca, Gedeon, Gia, Nina	Axel, Christian, Gedeon, Maurice	Axel, Gedeon	All housemates	Axel, Nadja	Axel, Gia, Maurice		
Evicted	Godfrey; 22.00% to save (out of 3)							Tessa; 2.14% to save	Kim Virginia; 11.85% to save	Nikola; 13.73% to save	René; 38.34% to save (out of 2)	Anouschka; 35.13% to save	Nina; 28.69% to save (out of 2)	Christian; 24.94% to save (out of 2)	Gedeon; 28.77% to save	Francesca; 8.30% to save	Nadja; 37.01% to save	Gia; 14.86% to win (out of 3)	Axel; 40.83% to win	
Evicted	Godfrey; 22.00% to save (out of 3)							Tessa; 2.14% to save	Kim Virginia; 11.85% to save	Nikola; 13.73% to save	René; 38.34% to save (out of 2)	Anouschka; 35.13% to save	Nina; 28.69% to save (out of 2)	Christian; 24.94% to save (out of 2)	Gedeon; 28.77% to save	Francesca; 8.30% to save	Nadja; 37.01% to save	Maurice; 59.17% to win		
