= Susser =

Susser is a surname. Notable people with the surname include:

- Bobby Susser (1942–2020), American songwriter, record producer, and performer
- Evan Susser (born 1985), American comedy writer and television producer
- Marc J. Susser, American historian
- Mervyn Susser (1921–2014), South African activist, doctor and epidemiologist
- Siegfried Susser (1953–2025), German footballer
- Spencer Susser (born 1977), American filmmaker and film editor

== See also ==
- Mike Süsser (born 1971), German chef and author
