= Mike Süsser =

German chef and author (born 1971)

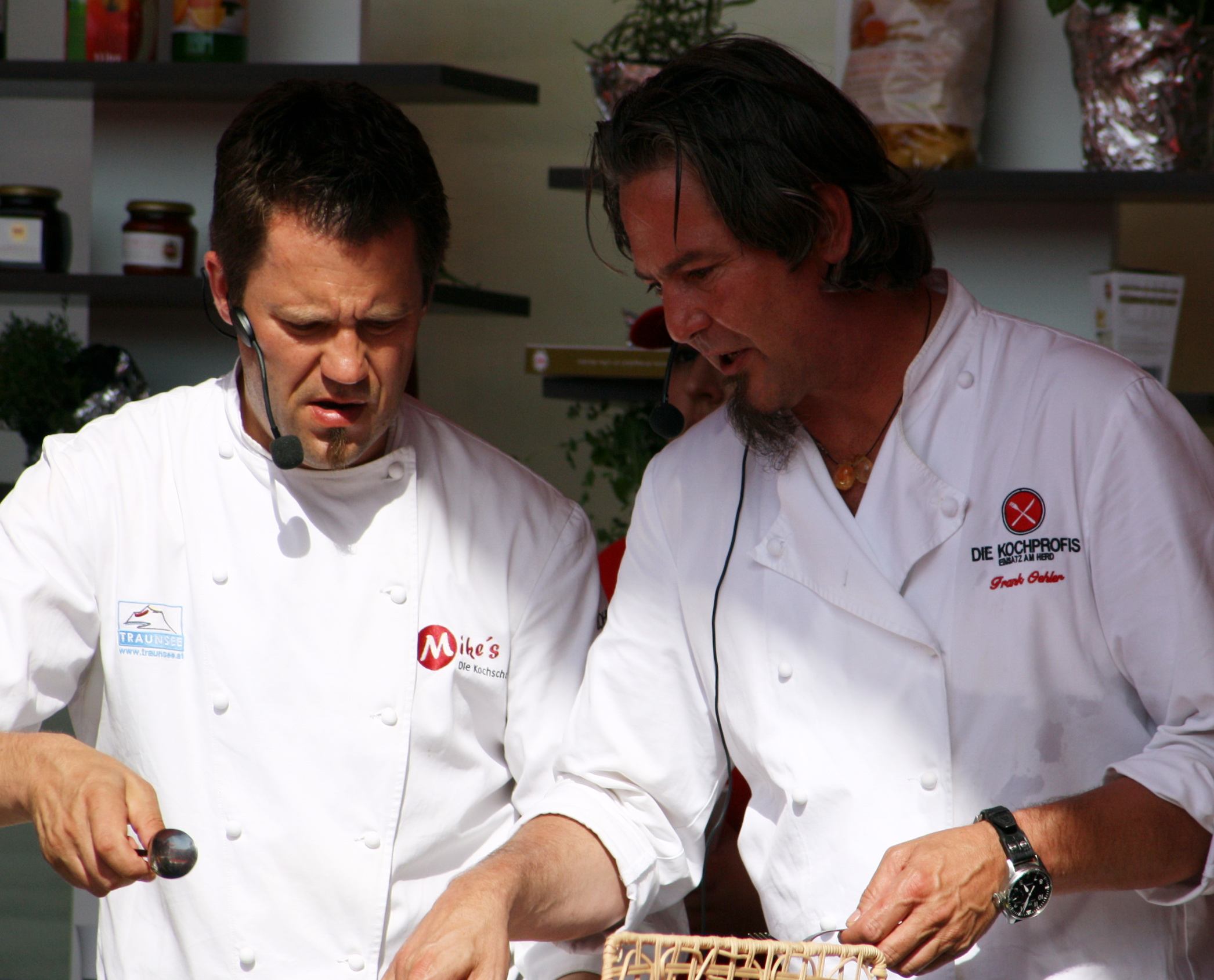
Mike Süsser (left) with fellow "Kochprofi" Frank Oehler

Mike Süsser (born 8 January 1971) is a German chef and author.

Süsser was born in Itzehoe, and learned his cooking skills in his home town of Burg, Dithmarschen, before working in kitchens in the United States, Davos, Hamburg, Fuerteventura and Madeira. He later moved to Austria where he worked in Salzburg, setting up his first Koch-Event-Studio in Gmunden.

Aside from writing cookbooks, Süsser has appeared on Austrian television and on the RTL II cooking show "Die Kochprofis". He is currently a judge on Sport1's MasterChef Germany.
