= My Style Rocks Germany =

- Genre: Reality competition
- Presented by: Gülcan Kamps
- Judges: Sandra Bauknecht; Harald Glööckler; Larissa Marolt; Andreas Wendt
- Country of origin: Germany
- Original language: German
- No. of seasons: 1
- No. of episodes: 41

Production
- Running time: 120 minutes
- Production company: Acun Medya

Original release
- Network: Sport1
- Release: 15 October 2024 – present

My Style Rocks is a German reality competition television series based on the Turkish format of İşte Benim Stilim. Hosted by Gülcan Kamps, the series features a group of female contestants presenting runway outfits in different categories, which are rated by the jury and their fellow competitors; the highest-scoring contestant ultimately wins a cash prize of €20,000.

The series premiered on 15 October 2024 on Sport1.

== Production ==
The series is produced by Acun Medya, which brought My Style Rocks and several other reality series to Sport1 in order to introduce a wider array of entertainment programs to the channel.

=== Format ===
In each episode, the participants have to put together outfits based on a specific theme. They wear the outfits on the runway, and then explain their choice and their inspirations for the outfit. The other competitors then award points for the outfit on a scale of 1 to 5 points, with 5 points being the highest score. The jury then also gives its vote on the same points scale. The contestant's total score is a sum of all of the points given by the jury, and the average value of all points given by other competitors. At the end of the week, the competitor with the highest score receives a weekly cash prize of €1,500.

The three candidates with the lowest total scores are placed in the "Danger Zone". First, the other competitors vote by writing down the name of a candidate they want to save; the one with the most votes remains in the competition. The jury then decides on the remaining two candidates, with each jury member nominating one competitor for elimination. The competitor with the most jury votes is eliminated. In the event of a tie, the jury tries to make a joint decision. New competitors also join the competition.

=== Judges ===
- Sandra Bauknecht
- Harald Glööckler
- Larissa Marolt
- Andreas Wendt

== Contestants ==
Name	Age	Competing since	Result
Theresia Fischer	32	Episode 1	Winner
Christina Grass	36	Episode 1	Eliminated
Michelle Monballijin	45	Episode 1	TBA
Arielle Rippegather	33	Episode 1	TBA
Maxime Ocasek	21	Episode 1	Eliminated
Greta Barthel	25	Episode 1	TBA
Gloria Glumac	32	Episode 1	Eliminated
Mimi Gwozdz	30	Episode 1	TBA
Kim Kailani	24	Episode 1	TBA
Jessica Fiorini	28	Episode 1	Eliminated
Aneta Sablik	35	Episode 1	TBA
Rina Tavares	22	Episode 1	Eliminated
Samira Diasso	24	Episode 6	TBA
Tatum Koch	26	Episode 11	Eliminated
Lisa Klemp	33	Episode 16	Eliminated
Annelie Henze	27	Episode 21	Eliminated
Patrizia Scaglioso Visconte	39	Episode 26	TBA
Drew Van K.	35	Episode 31	TBA
Bea Peters	42	Episode 36	Eliminated

== Episodes ==
No.	Title	Original release date
1	"Club Night"	15 October 2024
2	"Beach Party"	16 October 2024
3	"Brunch mit Freunden"	17 October 2024
4	"Erstes Date"	18 October 2024
5	"Gala: Feathers & Wings"	20 October 2024
6	"Animal Print"	21 October 2024
7	"Freestyle"	22 October 2024
8	"Pink"	23 October 2024
9	"Heavy Metal"	24 October 2024
10	"Gala: Halloween Queen"	25 October 2024
11	"Femme fatale"	28 October 2024
12	"Kennenlernen Schwiegereltern"	29 October 2024
13	"Cocktail mit dem Ex"	30 October 2024
14	"Colour Blocking"	31 October 2024
15	"Gala: Red Carpet"	1 November 2024
16	"Herbstspaziergang"	11 November 2024
17	"Fashion Show VIP Gast"	12 November 2024
18	"Rote Schuhe Challenge"	13 November 2024
19	"Zeige Deine Beine"	14 November 2024
20	"Gala: Hochzeit"	15 November 2024
21	"Freestyle"	18 November 2024
22	"Country Style"	19 November 2024
23	"Freestyle"	20 November 2024
24	"Glow Up"	21 November 2024
25	"Gala: Ikonen"	22 November 2024
26	"Jobinterview"	25 November 2024
27	"Gold Challenge"	26 November 2024
28	"Strick Challenge"	27 November 2024
29	"Märchenfiguren"	28 November 2024
30	"Gala: Maskenball"	29 November 2024
31	"Freestyle"	2 December 2024
32	"Freestyle"	3 December 2024
33	"Freestyle mit Tasche"	4 December 2024
34	"Freestyle"	5 December 2024
35	"Gala: 80er Jahre"	6 December 2024
36	"Freestyle"	9 December 2024
37	"Freestyle"	10 December 2024
38	"Freestyle mit Brille"	11 December 2024
39	"Freestyle"	12 December 2024
40	"Gala: Dancing Night"	13 December 2024
41	"Freestyle"	6 January 2025
42	"Freestyle"	7 January 2025
43	"Netzstrumpf"	8 January 2025
