= Deutschlands MeisterKoch =

- Genre: cooking show
- Judges: Tim Raue, Thomas Jaumann, Nelson Müller
- Country of origin: Germany
- Original language: German
- No. of seasons: 1

Original release
- Network: Sat.1
- Release: 2010 – 2016

Deutschlands MeisterKoch (English: Germany's Master Chef) is a German cooking competition television show that was broadcast in 2010 by Sat.1. It is based on the original UK show MasterChef. The winner of the first season was Jessica from Saarbrücken.

Due to low ratings the show was moved from its initial time slot on Friday evening to Saturday afternoon. It was not picked up for a second season.

A new version of the program, under its original English title of MasterChef, is currently being broadcast on the sports channel Sport1. It is presented by Mike Süsser, Robin Pietsch and Felicitas Then. The winner of its 2025 season, which at times rated 0.0, was Tugba Bayraktar.

== Seasons ==
Season	Age	Name	Winner	Runner-Up	Third-Place
1	2010	Deutschlands Meisterkoch	Jessica Dilworth	Martin Mierbrück	Sally Sarhensen
2	2016	MasterChef Germany	Alexander Kevart	Lisa Müller	Emre Mecikin

== Deutschlands MeisterKoch (2010) ==
=== Top 12 ===
Contestant	Age	Occupation	Hometown	Final position
Jessica Dilworth	30	Ophtalmologist	Saarbrücken	Winner
Martin Mierbruck	29	Nursery assistant	Karlsruhe	Runner-up
Sally Sarhensen	21	Law student	Altingen	3rd finalist
Felix Serrück	23	Student	Berlin	9th evicted
Manuel Paar	29	Dancer	Hamburg	8th evicted
Rainer Rosales	56	Owner of a supermarket	Erkrath	7th evicted
Christine Ogwuyenme	22	Medicine student	Staufen	6th evicted
Benjamin Odulanmi	30	Financial analyst	Braunschweig	5th evicted
Eliane Lama	30	History teacher	Hamburg	4th evicted
John Oksantala	34	Photographer	Cologne	3rd evicted
Andreas Veluderger	47	Former soccer player	Herrsching	2nd evicted
Brigitte Teps	53	Housewife	Herzogenrath	1st evicted

== MasterChef Germany (2016) ==
=== Top 16 ===
Contestant	Age	Hometown	Occupation	Status
Alexander Kevart	22	Munich, Bavaria	Biochemistry student	Winner 27 August
Lisa Müller	31	Frankfurt, Hesse	Journalist	Runner-Up 27 August
Wojciech "Wojtek" Sobczuk – Hohenzollern	22	Dortmund, North Rhine-Westphalia	Businessman	Third-Place 27 August
Veronika Strenkena	57	Suhl, Thuringia	Housewife	Eliminated 20 August
Mila Tiala-Mana	28	Berlin City	Haute couture model	Eliminated 13 August
Anton Iagaroved	39	Budapest, Hungary	Administrative employee	Eliminated 6 August; Returned; Eliminated 2 July
Dszenifer Kselivenisa	38	Berlin City	English teacher	Eliminated 30 July
Augustine Fonama	39	Accra, Ghana	Sales receptionist	Eliminated 23 July
Manuel Stuenfauss	28	Gelsenkirchen, North Rhine-Westphalia	Stage producer	Eliminated 16 July
Anne-Marie Kosreiss Starkhemer	62	Aurich, Lower Saxony	Retired	Eliminated 9 July
Sara Takcheni	42	Hamburg City	Biomagnetism therapist	Eliminated 25 June
Julian Straumer	19	Berlin City	Student	Eliminated 18 June
Dara Malaven	24	Berlin City	Professional baker	Eliminated 11 June
Manuel Tzekerono	38	Braunschweig, Lower Saxony	Fashion designer	Eliminated 4 June
Angelina Pasenak	32	Ulm, Baden-Württemberg	Nutritionist	Eliminated 28 May
Lukas Borrenberg	29	Munich, Bavaria	Supermarket employee	Eliminated 21 May

== Judges ==
- Tim Raue
- Thomas Jaumann
- Nelson Müller
