= Harald Glööckler =

German fashion designer

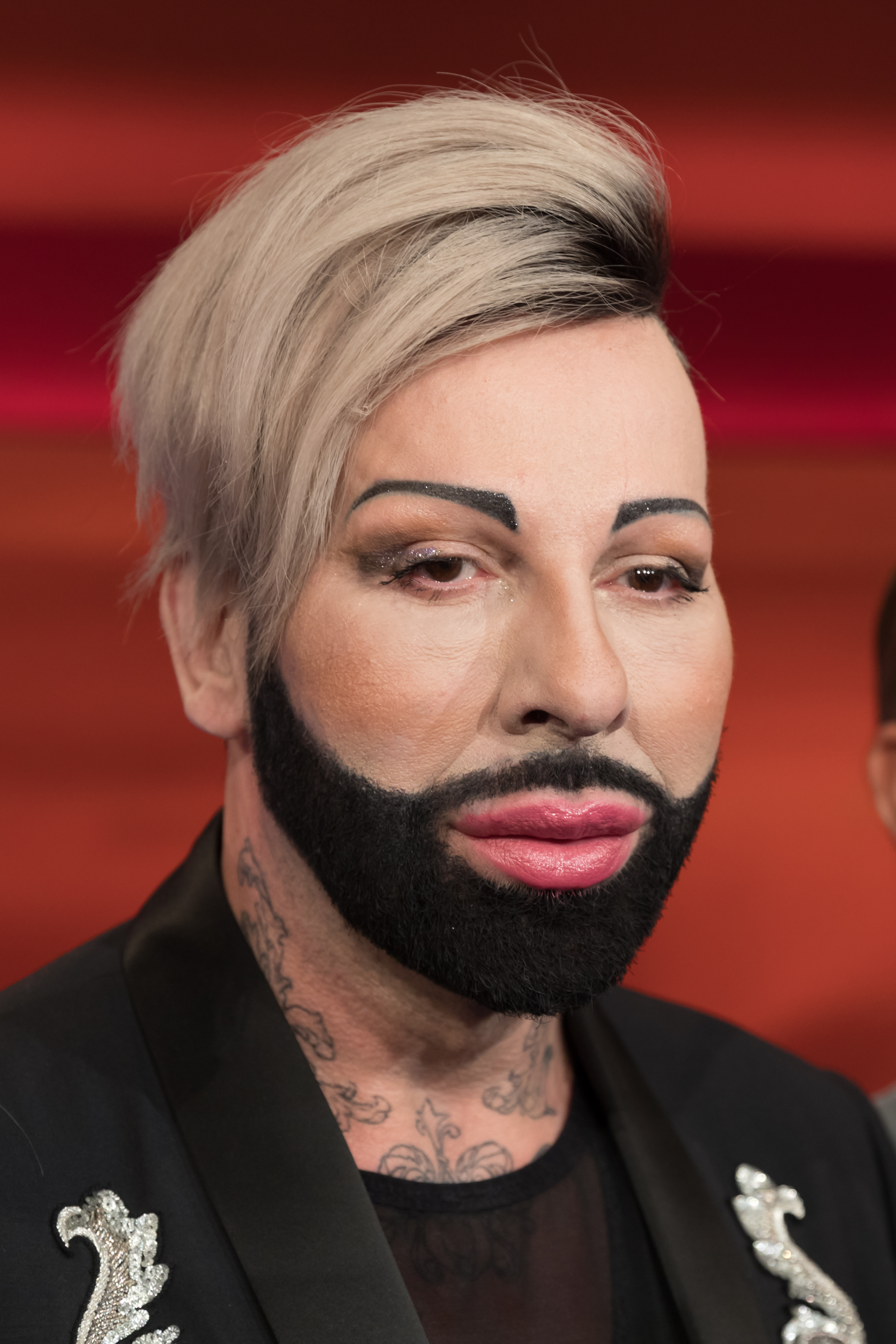
Glööckler in 2019

Harald Glööckler, real name Harald Glöckler (born 30 May 1965), is a German fashion designer and entrepreneur, who became famous mainly for his rhinestone-studded and glittering creations. His trademark is a crown motif, which is often supplemented by a "POMPÖÖS" lettering.

== Early life ==
Glööckler's parents owned a restaurant. He has a brother who is two years his junior. Glööckler describes his childhood as a traumatic time, shaped above all by his violent and alcoholic father. In addition, he was sexually assaulted by a family friend, which he never discussed due to his unstable parental home. When Glööckler was 19 years old, his mother died by falling down stairs. This was regarded as an accident by authorities, however, according to Glööckler, the fall was caused by his father, to whom he never spoke a single word again, until he died in 1992, 13 years later.

== Career ==
Glööckler was already interested in fashion in his youth and sewed evening gowns for acquaintances. He completed an apprenticeship as a retail salesman in the fashion store Sämann and was initially active as a salesman in the men's department of a fashion house in Mühlacker. On 30 November 1987, he opened the fashion store "Jeans Garden" in Stuttgart together with his manager and life partner, a haberdasher called Dieter Schroth, where they initially sold mainly jeans and shirts designed by Glööckler. Later, the name of the fashion business was changed to "Pompöös". In 1990 both founded a fashion label under the same name. In 1994 they organized their first fashion show at the Stuttgart New Palace. A song with the title "Pompöös is my life" and a music video were produced for the show. In 1995, Glööckler, Schroth and costumed dancers performed as a music group called Pompöös at a fashion show and at several German TV shows such as Arabella and RTL Nachtshow. In the same year Gina Lollobrigida and Chaka Khan became both his customers and friends. Lollobrigida opened Glööckler's second fashion show, which took place at Stuttgart's Alte Reithalle and featured Chaka Khan and Grace Bumbry. In 1997 Glööckler was invited to Hong Kong to present his fashion show for the occasion of the 10th anniversary of the Interstoff Asia trade fair. When he returned from Hong Kong, there were differences with an anonymous business partner, who retired in 1998 from the company following a dispute. The store in Stuttgart had to be closed afterwards. He was invited to Rome by Lollobrigida, where he discovered his love for painting. Back in Stuttgart, he opened an art gallery with his own paintings in 1998. In the same year Glööckler was invited to the Düsseldorf fashion fair CPD, where he hosted the opening show, during which Brigitte Nielsen also presented her fashion.

In 2000, Glööckler moved from Stuttgart to Berlin. There, in 2002, he equipped the Christmas revue Jingle Bells at the Friedrichstadt-Palast with his creations and designed around 350 costumes for the dancers. In 2003, he received the award Berliner Bär from the tabloid B.Z, and the Berlin city magazine tip, elected him among the "100 most embarrassing Berlineans". In 2009, he launched the 5000 Euro Harald Glööckler Angel Award, honoring every year women who excelled in humanity and social commitment. In 2011 Glööckler designed his own jewelry collection for the discounter Lidl. In 2012 he created women's clothing and accessories in cooperation with the mail-order company bonprix and also rolled out his own wallpaper collection. In 2013, a collection followed in cooperation with the menswear label Masterhand, which was presented for the first time on 15 June 2013 at the wedding fair Interbride. His first collection of lamps called "Glööckler by EGLO", which was turned into life in cooperation with EGLO Leuchten, could be seen for the first time at the 2014 Light+Building fair. At the end of January 2015, Glööckler presented a napkin collection, which he designed exclusively for the Duni company. In April 2015, the designer presented his paintings and sculptures for sale for the first time at a large vernissage in Berlin's Galerie Mensing. The works cost up to 50 000 euros.

On behalf of the German Bible Society, Glööckler designed a book slipcase for the new Bible edition that was issued on the occasion of the 500th anniversary of the reformation in 2017.

=== Television ===
After meeting with the managing director of the home shopping channel HSE24 in Berlin in 2004, Glööckler began selling his products on television in Germany. He only sold his fashion articles at first, but later interior decorating articles and furnishings he designed were also available. He did further homeshopping hosting on QVC UK in the UK in 2008 and Shop Channel in Japan in 2009. In June 2010, he did his last show at HSE24, as he did not extend the current contract that ran out in November 2010. Since January 2011, he is under contract to QVC Germany. He hosts the sales shows of his products on a regular basis, where he occurs strongly extroverted.

In 2010 and 2011, Glööckler was a permanent jury member of the dance show Let's Dance on private broadcaster RTL. During his performances, Glööckler often attracted attention, as in addition to a great deal of jewelry, he also occasionally wore rhinestones on his face, as well as eye-catching clothing from his own women's collection. In the UK, ITV Studios produced the 2010 documentary Harald Glööckler: Prince of Fashion for the station Living.

On 1 January 2012, VOX broadcast the documentary Herr Glööckler zieht um, in which he is shown on the relocation of his company and residence from Berlin-Charlottenburg to Berlin-Mitte ("Unter den Linden"). From 3 July to 21 August 2012, the weekly personality documentary Glööckler, Glanz and Gloria was broadcast on VOX. In March and April 2013, VOX aired the second season; its ratings were significantly lower than those of the first season. In November 2013, Glööckler announced that he would no longer want to appear on television shows other than his QVC sales programs. However, in 2016 he was a jury member of the RTL II plus-size model casting show Curvy Supermodel – Echt. Schön. Kurvig. In addition, he invited host Pierre M. Krause with his interview format Krause kommt for two days in his Château Pompöös to Kirchheim (first broadcast on SWR on 23 February 2018).

Since October 2024, Glööckler is one of the main judges on Sport1's fashion reality competition series My Style Rocks.

== Personal life ==
Glööckler was baptized a Protestant. He has left the church but still identifies himself as a devout Christian who prays and reads the Bible regularly. Since 2015, Glööckler lives with his business partner and life partner Dieter Schroth in Kirchheim an der Weinstraße. Since February 2015, they have lived in a registered life partnership.

Glööckler underwent numerous cosmetic surgeries to change his face according to his own ideas.

Glööckler was depicted naked in 2004 for a PETA campaign with the slogan "animals wear fur, people wear fashion".

Glööckler regards himself as the inspiration for Sacha Baron Cohen's character Brüno.

In July 2018, Glööckler suffered from an anaphylactic shock, which he survived thanks to immediate emergency treatment.

== Music ==
- 1994: Pompöös – Pompöös Is My Life (Label: Black Flame)
- 1994: Pompöös – "I Want Your Love" (Label: Black Flame)

Producers: Lenny Mac Dowell, Nikolei Dotzek, Oliver Voigt, Piero Brunetti

== Film ==
- 2015: Famous Five 4

== Literature ==
- Ines Veith, Harald Glööckler: Pompöös – Harald Glööckler, der Modeprinz, Merch Movie Edition, 2001
- Harald Glööckler, Christiane Stella Bongertz (2010), Harald Glööckler (in German) (2. ed.), Köln: Bastei Lübbe, p. 268, ISBN 978-3-7857-2412-5
- Harald Glööckler (2012), Jede Frau ist eine Prinzessin (in German) (1. ed.), Heimsheim: Printsystem Medienverlag, p. 228, ISBN 978-3-938295-46-5
- Harald Glööckler (2013), Billy King – mein Leben mit Harald Glööckler (in German) (1. ed.), Falkensee: Tierisch Verlegen Verlagsgesellschaft UG, p. 104, ISBN 978-3-00-041263-9
- Harald Glööckler (2013), Harald Glööckler der Medienskandal (in German) (1. ed.), Heimsheim: Printsystem Medienverlag, p. 144, ISBN 978-3-938295-88-5
