= Eine für alle – Frauen können's besser =

- Country of origin: Germany

Eine für alle – Frauen können's besser is a German television series.

== See also ==
- List of German television series
