= Adela Smajic =

Swiss television presenter (born 1993)

Adela Smajic (born March 1, 1993 in Neuchâtel) is a Swiss presenter and reality TV participant. In 2018, she was a protagonist on The Bachelorette on 3 Plus TV.

== Life ==
Adela Smajic has a Serbian mother and a Bosnian father, former Super League soccer professional and Bosnian -Herzegovinian national soccer player Admir Smajic. She has two sisters and grew up in Basel.

Smajic studies media studies and sociology at the University of Basel. In addition, she began to work for the regional television station Telebasel.

Smajic gained greater notoriety in 2018 when she appeared as a Swiss bachelorette on 3 Plus. She dated the show's winner for a month.

Since January 2017 she has been working as a moderator and weather presenter for Telebasel. She is one of the presenters and producers of the channel's weekday, pre-evening people and lifestyle magazine Glam. Since 2020, she has been inviting guests to her place in the Bi dr Adela Dehei section on a weekly basis.

In August 2020, Smajic took part in the eighth season of Promi Big Brother on Sat.1 and came in eleventh place.

== Moderations ==
- since 2017: Glam (Telebasel)
- since 2017: Telebasel weather (within the news ) (Telebasel)
- 2018–2019: INSIDE destinations ( TeleZüri )

== More TV appearances ==
- 2018: The Bachelorette ( 3 Plus TV )
- 2018: TalkTäglich (TeleZüri) (June 19)
- 2020: Celebrity Big Brother ( Sat.1 )
- 2020: Celebrity Big Brother – The Late Night Show ( sixx )
- 2020: Helvetia ( SRF, Season 3, Episode 2) [2] (28 August)
