= Sport1 (Germany) =

German television channel

- Logo used since 2024
- Country: Germany
- Broadcast area: Germany; Austria; Switzerland
- Headquarters: Ismaning, Germany

Programming
- Language: German
- Picture format: 1080i HDTV (downscaled to 16:9 576i for the SDTV feed)

Ownership
- Owner: Sport1 Medien AG, Acun Medya

History
- Launched: 1 January 1993
- Former names: Deutsches Sportfernsehen (1993–2010)

Links
- Website: www.sport1.de

Availability

Terrestrial
- Digital terrestrial television: Channel slots vary depending on the region (HD)

Sport1 (German: Sport Eins) is a German free-to-air television channel centred towards sports programming, as well as teleshopping. It was launched on 1 January 1993 as DSF (Deutsches Sportfernsehen), replacing the television channel Tele 5 which had become the successor of the music video channel Musicbox on 11 January 1988. The channel took its current name on 11 April 2010.

Sport1 has its headquarters in Ismaning near Munich.

== Programming ==
=== Football ===
- 3.Liga (2020–2024) (on Sport1+)
- DFB Pokal (2020–2024) (on Sport1+)
- DFB-Pokal women (2020–2023)
- International Champions Cup (10 of 18 matches (including all German clubs))
- 2. Fußball-Bundesliga: (highlights on Friday & Sunday)
- Regionalliga
- Scottish Premiership, Championship and League Cup (on Sport1+)
- English Football League (exclude EFL Cup) (on Sport1+)
- Ligue 1 (on Sport1+)
- Copa Libertadores (on Sport1+)
- UEFA European Under-21 Championship (non-Germany matches)
- UEFA European Under-19 Championship
- UEFA European Under-17 Championship
- UEFA Youth League
- UEFA Women's Under-19 Championship
- UEFA Women's Under-17 Championship
- AFC Champions League Elite (2021–2028)

=== Basketball ===
- FIBA World Championship
- FIBA World Championship for Women
- German national team
- Basketball Bundesliga (1 game per week)
- NBA (on Sport1+)
- NCAA (on Sport1US)

=== Handball ===
- World Women's Handball Championship
- Germany men's national handball team

=== Other sports ===
- PDC World Darts Championship
- ATP World Tour
- CEV Champions League
- World Ice Hockey Championships
- European Tour
- NCAA football (on Sport1US)
- National Hockey League (on Sport1US)
- NASCAR (on Sport1US)
- IndyCar Series
- Major League Baseball
- XFL

=== Non-sports ===
- Alone (Alone - Überleben in der Wildnis) (2017–present)
- Aussie Pickers (Aussie Pickers - Die Trödelexperten) (2015–2016)
- Barry'd Treasure (Barry'd Treasure - Der Trödelexperte) (2016–present)
- Big Brian: The Fortune Seller (Big Brian - Der große Ausverkauf) (2015)
- Buy It, Fix It, Sell It (Alte Stücke, neuer Glanz) (2017–present)
- Chow Masters (Diner Wars) (2015)
- Container Wars (2014–present)
- Counting Cars (Die Werkstatt-Helden) (2014-2016)
- Dig Wars (Dig Wars - Die Schatzgräber) (2015-2017)
- Garage Gold (2016–present)
- Hard Knocks (2013)
- Hardcore Pawn: Chicago (2015-2016)
- Storage Hunters (UK) (2015–present)
- Storage Hunters (US) (2014–present)
- Storage Wars (Storage Wars - Die Geschäftemacher) (2013–present)
- The Liquidator (2015–present)
- Yukon Gold (2015–present)
- Sexy Sport Clips (2002–2024)
- Sport-Quiz (2003–2022)
- My Style Rocks (2024–)
- MasterChef Germany (2025-)

== Audience share ==
=== Germany ===
	January	February	March	April	May	June	July	August	September	October	November	December	Annual average
1993	-	-	-	-	-	-	-	-	-	-	-	-	1.3%
1994	-	-	-	-	-	-	-	-	-	-	-	-	▼1.2%
1995	-	-	-	-	-	-	-	-	-	-	-	-	▲1.3%
1996	1.6%	0.8%	1.1%	1.2%	1.2%	1.1%	1.1%	1.1%	1.4%	0.9%	0.9%	1.0%	▼1.1%
1997	1.5%	0.9%	1.0%	1.1%	1.1%	2.0%	1.4%	1.2%	1.1%	1.1%	1.0%	0.9%	▲1.2%
1998	1.3%	0.8%	1.2%	1.3%	1.2%	1.1%	1.1%	1.2%	1.4%	1.1%	1.1%	1.0%	▼1.1%
1999	1.3%	0.8%	1.1%	1.3%	1.3%	1.6%	1.5%	1.4%	1.6%	1.5%	1.4%	1.4%	▲1.3%
2000	1.3%	1.1%	1.3%	1.4%	1.3%	1.0%	1.1%	1.1%	1.1%	1.2%	1.0%	1.0%	▼1.2%
2001	1.1%	1.0%	1.0%	1.1%	1.0%	1.0%	1.1%	1.1%	1.1%	1.0%	0.9%	0.8%	▼1.0%
2002	0.8%	0.9%	1.0%	1.0%	0.8%	0.9%	0.8%	0.9%	1.0%	1.0%	0.9%	0.8%	▼0.9%
2003	0.8%	0.8%	0.9%	1.0%	1.2%	1.0%	1.1%	1.2%	1.1%	1.1%	1.3%	1.1%	▲1.1%
2004	1.1%	1.3%	1.3%	1.4%	1.3%	0.9%	0.8%	0.9%	1.1%	1.3%	1.2%	1.0%	1.1%
2005	1.0%	1.2%	1.1%	1.3%	1.3%	1.0%	0.9%	1.3%	1.5%	1.1%	1.2%	1.1%	▲1.2%
2006	0.8%	1.2%	1.0%	1.2%	0.8%	0.5%	0.6%	1.0%	1.2%	1.2%	1.2%	1.0%	▼1.0%
2007	0.9%	1.2%	1.0%	1.5%	1.2%	0.8%	0.8%	1.1%	1.3%	1.1%	1.1%	0.9%	▲1.1%
2008	0.7%	1.2%	1.0%	1.1%	1.0%	0.6%	0.8%	0.8%	1.1%	1.0%	0.9%	0.8%	▼0.9%
2009	0.7%	0.8%	0.9%	1.0%	1.1%	1.1%	0.9%	1.0%	0.8%	0.8%	0.9%	0.7%	0.9%
2010	0.9%	0.7%	0.8%	0.9%	1.3%	0.6%	0.7%	0.8%	0.8%	0.8%	0.8%	0.7%	▼0.8%
2011	0.9%	0.8%	0.8%	0.9%	1.1%	0.7%	0.7%	1.1%	1.0%	0.8%	0.8%	0.8%	▲0.9%
2012	0.8%	0.7%	0.7%	0.9%	0.9%	0.6%	0.6%	0.5%	0.8%	0.6%	0.7%	0.8%	▼0.7%
2013	0.7%	0.7%	0.7%	1.0%	1.1%	0.9%	0.8%	0.9%	1.0%	0.8%	0.9%	0.9%	▲0.9%
2014	0.7%	0.7%	0.9%	1.0%	0.9%	0.6%	0.7%	0.9%	0.9%	0.8%	0.9%	0.9%	▼0.8%
2015	0.8%	0.7%	0.9%	0.9%	1.1%	0.8%	1.0%	1.0%	1.0%	0.9%	1.0%	1.0%	▲0.9%
2016	0.8%	0.9%	0.9%	1.4%	1.1%	0.6%	0.8%	0.7%	1.0%	0.9%	0.9%	1.0%	0.9%
2017	0.7%	0.9%	1.1%	1.1%	1.3%	0.8%	0.7%	0.7%	0.8%	0.8%	0.8%	1.1%	0.9%
2018	0.6%	0.7%	0.8%	1.0%									
