= IGTV =

Vertical video application by Instagram

- Developer: Instagram
- Initial release: June 20, 2018; 7 years ago
- Operating system: iOS, Android
- Size: 140.3 MB (iOS), 30.05 MB (Android)
- Available in: 30 languages
- List of languages English, Croatian, Czech, Danish, Dutch, Finnish, French, German, Greek, Indonesian, Italian, Japanese, Korean, Malay, Norwegian, Polish, Portuguese, Romanian, Russian, Simplified Chinese, Slovak, Spanish, Swedish, Tagalog, Thai, Traditional Chinese, Turkish, Ukrainian, Vietnamese
- Type: online video sharing platform
- Licence: Freeware
- Website: business.instagram.com/a/igtv

IGTV, short for Instagram TV, was a video application by Instagram for Android and iOS smartphones. It allowed for longer videos compared to Instagram feeds. IGTV was available as a stand-alone app, though basic functionality was also available within the Instagram app and website.

The service was launched and introduced by former Instagram CEO Kevin Systrom in a live event in San Francisco on June 20, 2018, featuring creators such as Lele Pons.

== Service ==
IGTV required users to log in with an Instagram account. Mobile devices allowed uploads of up to 15 minutes in length with a file size of up to 650 MB, while desktop web browsers allowed uploads of up to 60 minutes in length with a file size of up to 3.6 GB. The app auto-played videos as soon as it was launched, which Kevin Systrom contrasted to video hosts where one must first locate a video.

Instagram accounts with an IGTV channel received an IGTV tab on their profile page. Additionally, uploads on IGTV could be mirrored to a linked Facebook page.

In May 2019, IGTV gained the ability to upload landscape videos.

The standalone app was not widely adopted. In January 2020, it was reported that it only had around 7 million users. In October 2021, Instagram began to merge IGTV's functionality into the main Instagram app, including its video upload and editing functionality, changing the IGTV tab on user profiles to simply "Video"—which included IGTV posts and existing in-feed videos and live streams (though excluding Reels , its short-form video format), and updating the video playback interface. Instagram stated that the standalone app would remain operational for the time being.

In February 2022, Instagram announced that IGTV would be discontinued in March 2022, electing to focus on video functionality in the main app (including Reels).
