= Jochen Schropp =

German actor and television host

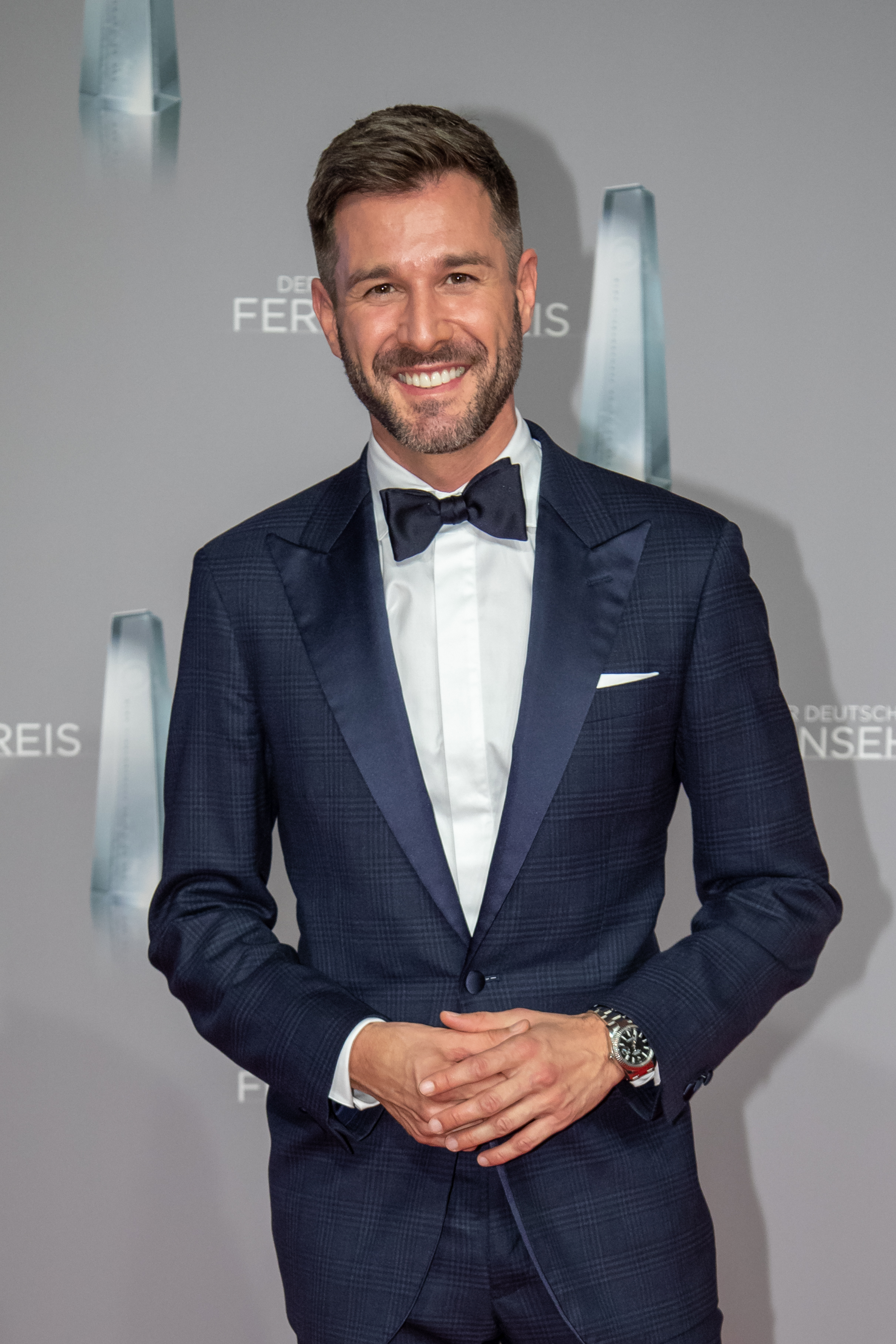
- Schropp in 2019
- Born: Jochen Alexander Schropp; 22 November 1978 (age 47); Lahn-Giessen, West Germany
- Occupations: Actor, television host
- Years active: 2001–present

Jochen Alexander Schropp (born 22 November 1978 in Lahn-Giessen, Hesse) is a German actor and television host.

== Biography ==
Schropp was born in 1978 as the child of a teacher and a medical assistant in the former municipality of Gießen in the city of Lahn. After his high school year in Visalia, California, where Schropp gained his first acting experience, he played at the American theater in Giessen. In addition, he also worked as a small actor, extras and in advertising and began training as a vocalist and speaker at the Hessischer Rundfunk in Frankfurt. After graduating from high school at the Weidigschule in Butzbach, Schropp did his community service in a dialysis center in Giessen. After a musical workshop in Hamburg, he studied at Paul McCartney's Liverpool Institute for Performing Arts (LIPA) in the United Kingdom for two and a half years. However, Schropp ended the training prematurely. In 2000, he reported on the Love Parade for RTL Zwei.

He received his first major role in the ARD evening series Sternenfänger, in which he played together with Nora Tschirner, Oliver Pocher and Florentine Lahme. Since then he has participated in script readings, works as a speaker and presenter, for example at the Max-Ophuls-Preis film festival in Saarbrücken or as a presenter for the presentation of the short film bear at the Berlinale. In March 2005 he played a role in the comedy Popp Dich slim!, for which he had to gain twelve kilograms of body mass. At the end of 2006 he had a role in the ARD series Zwei Engel für Amor, which in the following year for the Adolf Grimme Prize was nominated. Since 2007, he has also played leading roles in various ZDF television films and embodied the forensic specialist in Polizeiruf 110 in Halle in eight episodes.

In addition to acting, he moderated for Berlin lifestyle web TV Luxity.TV and devoted himself more and more to moderation. From 2010 to 2012 he moderated the German version of X Factor for VOX. In 2014 he switched to ProSiebenSat.1 Media. There he replaced Oliver Pocher and Cindy aus Marzahn as the new host of the Promi Big Brother. On Sat.1 he also moderated the improcomedy show Jetzt wird's schräg, as well as the game show Himmel oder Hölle on ProSieben. In 2020 he moderated the thirteenth season of the German show Big Brother on Sat.1.

== Personal life and social engagement ==
He has lived in Berlin since 2001 and has been in a relationship with his partner since spring 2018. Since 2009 he has been supporting the SOS Children's Villages. He regularly visits SOS projects to see the work on site for himself. In 2012 he donated his profits from the TV show Promi-Kocharena to the organization and also supported it in 2014 by hosting the preview of the musical Das Wunder von Bern.

== Filmography ==
- 2001: Abschnitt 40
- 2002: Sternenfänger
- 2002: Der Fussfesselmörder
- 2002: Wozu Freunde?!
- 2003: Kleiner Matrose
- 2003: Der kleine Mönch
- 2004: Der schönste Tag im Leben
- 2005–2006: Alphateam – Die Lebensretter im OP (26 episodes)
- 2005: Leonys Aufsturz
- 2005: Make Love, Not Fat
- 2006: Außergewöhnlich
- 2006: Zwei Engel für Amor
- 2006: In aller Freundschaft: Mein fremder Mann
- 2006: SOKO Leipzig: Maskenball
- 2007: Kein Geld der Welt
- 2007: Rosamunde Pilcher – Sieg der Liebe
- 2007: Polizeiruf 110 – Taximord
- 2008: Polizeiruf 110 – Wolfsmilch
- 2008: Inga Lindström – Rasmus und Johanna
- 2008: Meine wunderbare Familie
- 2008: Hallo Robbie! – Sturzflüge
- 2008: Rosamunde Pilcher – Eine Liebe im Herbst
- 2008: Polizeiruf 110 – Der Tod und das Mädchen
- 2008: Kreuzfahrt ins Glück – Hochzeitsreise nach Florida
- 2008: Großstadtrevier: Der Hafenpastor – Der Schein trügt
- 2008: Polizeiruf 110 – Fehlschuss
- 2009: Eine für alle – Frauen können's besser
- 2009: Polizeiruf 110 – Triptychon
- 2009: Der Bergdoktor – Zwischen den Stühlen
- 2009: Polizeiruf 110 – Schatten
- 2009: Polizeiruf 110 – Der Tod und das Mädchen
- 2009: Polizeiruf 110 – Tod im Atelier
- 2010: Polizeiruf 110 – Kapitalverbrechen
- 2010: Countdown – Die Jagd beginnt – Der Bruch
- 2010: Polizeiruf 110 – Risiko
- 2011: Lindburgs Fall
- 2012: Notruf Hafenkante – Ein letzter Kuss
- 2012: Polizeiruf 110 – Raubvögel
- 2013: Rosamunde Pilcher – Die versprochene Braut
- 2014: Kreuzfahrt ins Glück – Hochzeitsreise nach Dubai
- 2015: Mila
- 2015: Notruf Hafenkante – Endlich schlank
- 2015: Welcome All Sexes: 30 Jahre Teddy Awards – dokumentarisches Format
- 2017: Im Knast
- 2017: Schatz, nimm Du sie!
- 2017: Rosamunde Pilcher – Fast noch verheiratet
- 2019: Bettys Diagnose – Herz oder Verstand
- 2020: Schwester, Schwester

== Moderation ==
=== Current ===
- Since 2014: Promi Big Brother, Sat.1 – with Marlene Lufen (since 2018)
- Since 2018: Sat.1-Frühstücksfernsehen, Sat.1
- Since 2020: United Voices – Das größte Fanduell der Welt, Sat.1 – with Sarah Lombardi
- Since 2020: Ranking the Stars, Sat.1
- Since 2020: Die Festspiele der Reality-Stars – Wer ist die hellste Kerze?, Sat.1 – with Olivia Jones

=== Former ===
- 2010–2012: X Factor, RTL/VOX
- 2011: Jeder Stein zählt – Die LEGO Familienshow, VOX
- 2011: Wer is(s)t besser?, VOX
- 2012: Ein Bus voller Bräute, VOX
- 2012: Das perfekte Model: Die Final-Show, VOX
- 2012–2016: Teddy Award, Arte
- 2013: Gewinne ein neues Leben – Die Auswanderershow, VOX
- 2013: Die tierischen 10, VOX – with Martin Rütter
- 2013: Grill den Henssler, VOX
- 2014: Tohuwabohu, ZDFneo
- 2014–2015: Himmel oder Hölle, ProSieben
- 2014–2015: Science of Stupid – Wissenschaft der Missgeschicke, National Geographic Channel
- 2014–2016: Jetzt wird's schräg, Sat.1
- 2015: Plötzlich Krieg? – Ein Experiment, ZDFneo
- 2015: Die große Revanche, Sat.1
- 2016: Reingelegt – Die lustigsten Comedy-Fallen, Sat.1
- 2017: Schropp Lass Nach! – Web-Format, YouTube-Kanal World Wide Wohnzimmer
- 2017: Duell der Stars – Die Sat.1 Promiarena, Sat.1
- 2017: Bist du Euro50,000 wert?, ZDFneo
- 2017: Schätzen Sie mal, Das Erste
- 2017–2018: Das gibt's doch gar nicht!, Sat.1 (2017) / Sat.1 Emotions (2018)
- 2019: Endlich Feierabend!, Sat.1
- 2020: Promis unter Palmen – Die große Aussprache, Sat.1
- 2020: Big Brother, Sat.1 – 13th season
