= Melissa Khalaj =

German television host and singer

- Born: 23 May 1989 (age 35); Munich, West Germany
- Occupation: Presenter
- Years active: 2013–present

Melissa Khalaj (born 23 May 1989 in Munich, Bavaria) is a German television host and singer.

== Career ==
After participating in the sixth season of Popstars, she became a member of the Munich band Charly Bravo. She left the band to be presenter at Joiz Germany. There she presented the Living Room, Home Run, the Wardrobe Challenge and occasionally Coffee + Charts. The large audience was her by her appearance at the ProSieben broadcast Circus HalliGalli known.

In the same year she presented Etage 7, a web show about Germany's Next Topmodel.

Incidentally, she played in a music video of the rapper MC Fitti. Together with her Joiz colleague Alexandra Maurer, she presented the Red Carpet at the Echoverleihung 2014 for the station Joiz.

From 2014 to 2015, she presented together with Annie Hoffmann and Miriam Rickli the show Crash Games – Jeder Sturz zählt! on ProSieben. To accompany the second season of Promi Big Brother on Sat.1 she presented to sixx together with Jochen Bendel, the late-night talk show Promi Big Brother – Late Night Live. From 2015 to 2016 she presented the format under the new title Promi Big Brother – Die Late Night Show again, and also from 2018.

In November 2014, she participated with other celebrities in the sixx broadcast Frauendingsbums. In the second season Frauendingsbums Khalaj participates again. In February 2015, Khalaj was back in front of the camera for sixx and presented a show with the highlights of the 57th Annual Grammy Awards. She also acted as moderator additional formats on sixx.

On 27 July 2015, she announced that she is leaving the youth channel Joiz Germany. From October to December 2015, she summarized online on the homepage of the TV channel sixx the Big Brother week of the 12th season together. In 2017, she hosted an internet show along with Aaron Troschke before and after the premiere of Promi Big Brother.

Since September 2017 Khalaj presents her own radio show entitled The Melissa Khalaj Show at Jam FM.

== Personal life ==
Khalaj lives in Berlin and is in a relationship with actor Frederic Heidorn.

== Filmography ==
Television

| Year | Title | Channel | Role |
|---|---|---|---|
| 2007 | Popstars | ProSieben | Season 6, Contestant |
| 2013–2015 | Living Room | Joiz Germany | Presenter |
| 2013–2015 | Coffee+Charts | Joiz Germany | Presenter |
| 2013–2014 | Home Run | Joiz Germany | Presenter |
| 2014 | Wardrobe Challenge | Joiz Germany | |
| 2014–2015 | Crash Games – Jeder Sturz zählt! | ProSieben | |
| 2014 | Promi Big Brother – Late Night Live | sixx | Presenter |
| 2015–2016, 2018–2020 | Promi Big Brother – Die Late Night Show | sixx | Presenter |
| 2021–present | Promi Big Brother – Die Late Night Show | Sat.1 | Presenter |
| 2015 | Joiz Live! | Joiz Germany | |
| 2015 | Live&Direkt! | Joiz Germany | |
| 2015 | Die Grammy Awards 2015 – Das sixx Special | sixx | Presenter |
| 2015 | mydays sucht myhero | sixx | |
| 2015 | sixx Musik Quickie | sixx | |
| 2016 | sixx Beauty Quickie | sixx | |
| 2017–present | Die Melissa Khalaj Show | Jam FM | Presenter |
| 2019–present | The Voice Kids | Sat.1 | Presenter |
| 2020 | Big Brother – Die Late Night Show | sixx | Presenter |
| 2020 | Das große Sat.1 Promiboxen | Sat.1 | Presenter |
| 2022 | All Together Now | Sat.1 | Presenter |
| 2022 | The Voice of Germany | ProSieben/Sat.1 | Presenter |

Internet

| Year | Title | Site | Role |
|---|---|---|---|
| 2013 | Etage 7 | ProSieben.de | Presenter |
| 2017 | Promi Big Brother – Warm Up | Facebook | Presenter |
| 2017 | Promi Big Brother – Late Show | promibigbrother.de | Presenter |
| 2019–present | Germany's Next Topmodel The Talk | ProSieben.de | Presenter |
