= List of Promi Big Brother housemates =

Promi Big Brother is a spin-off of the German reality television series Big Brother, broadcast in Germany. It is airing on Sat.1, it involves a group of celebrities, called housemates, living in isolation from the outside world in a custom-built "house". The actions of the participants are recorded constantly by microphones and cameras situated in each room. Regularly, the housemates nominate one or two other members of the group each to face eviction; those with the most nominations face a public telephone vote, and the housemate who receives the most public votes is evicted. This procedure continues until the final day, when the viewers vote for who of the remaining participants they want to win the programme.

Since the start of Promi Big Brother in 2013 there have been a total of 105 housemates. There have been 8 winners of Promi Big Brother; five men and three women. The youngest winner is Aaron Troschke who was 24 at the time of winning Promi Big Brother 2, and the oldest is Werner Hansch, who was 82 when he won Promi Big Brother 8. The youngest housemates was Alessia-Millane Herren from Promi Big Brother 8, who entered the house at age 18. The oldest housemate was Werner Hansch from Promi Big Brother 8, who entered the house at age 81.

== Housemates ==
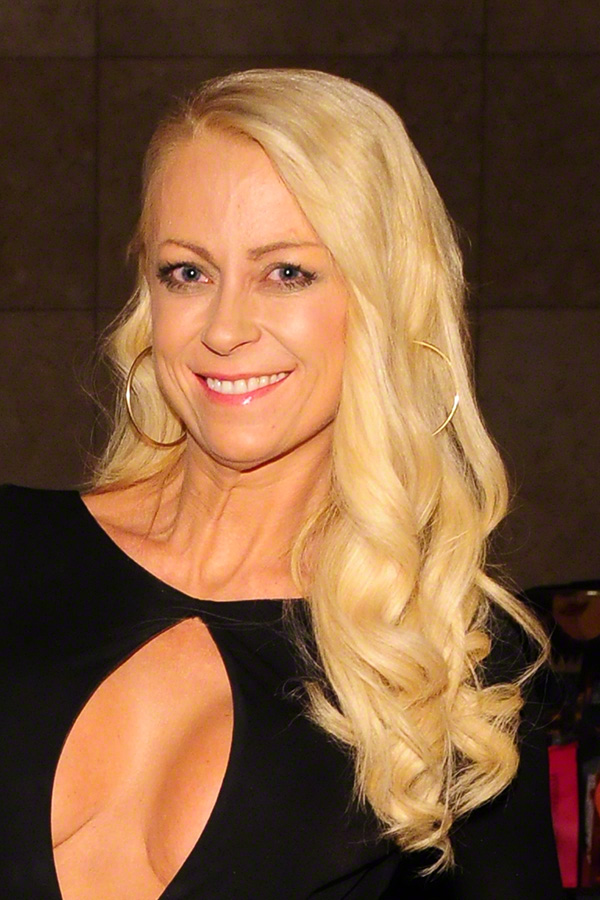
Jenny Elvers won the first season.

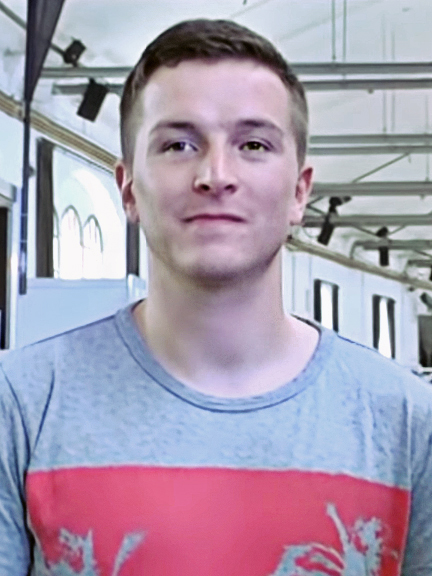
Aaron Troschke won the second season.

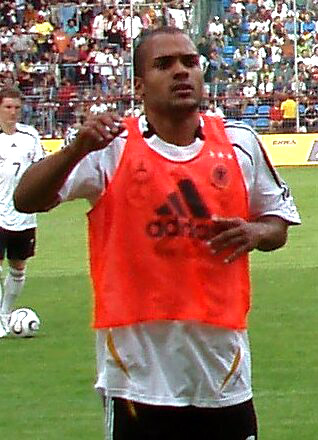
David Odonkor won the third season.

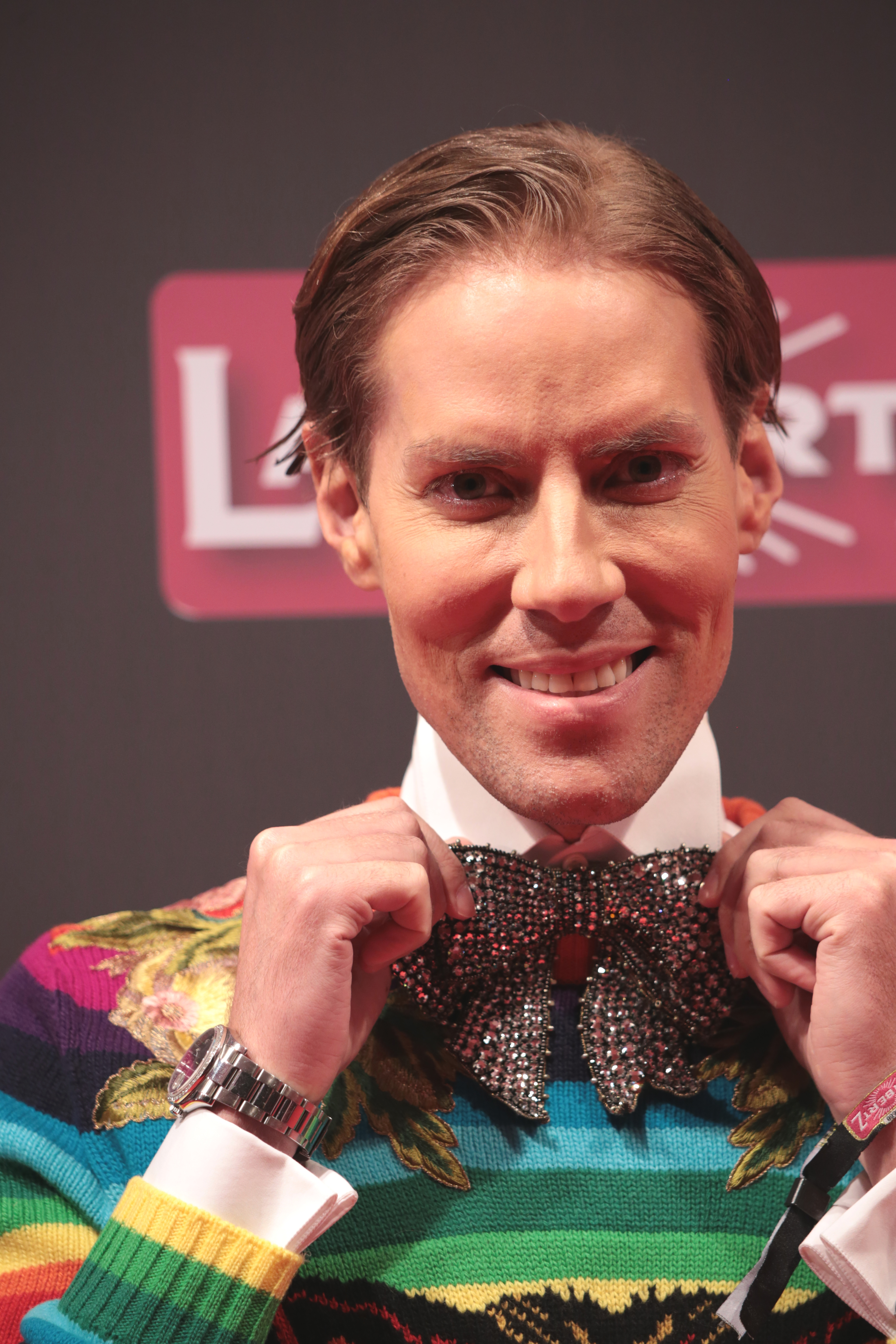
Jens Hilbert won the fifth season.

Winner
Runner-up
Third place
Walked
Ejected
Participating
Housemate entered for the second time

Series	Celebrity	Age	Notability	Status
1	Jenny Elvers	41	Actress	1st – Winner
1	Natalia Osada	23	Reality TV contestant	2nd – Runner-up
1	Marijke Amado	59	TV host	3rd – Third place
1	Simon Desue	22	Internet star	4th – Evicted
1	Martin Semmelrogge	57	Actor	5th – Evicted
1	Manuel Charr	28	Boxer	6th – Evicted
1	Fancy	67	Singer	7th – Evicted
1	Georgina Fleur	23	Reality TV star	8th – Evicted
1	Jan Leyk	28	Reality TV star	9th – Evicted
1	Lucy Diakovska	37	Singer	10th – Evicted
1	Percival Duke	42	Singer	11th – Evicted
1	Sarah Joelle Jahnel	24	Singer	12th – Walked
1	David Hasselhoff	61	Actor	13th – Walked
2	Aaron Troschke	24	Media personality	1st – Winner
2	Claudia Effenberg	49	Model/footballer's wife	2nd – Runner-up
2	Ronald Schill	55	Former politician and judge	3rd – Third place
2	Paul Janke	30	Reality TV star	4th – Evicted
2	Michael Wendler	42	Singer	5th – Evicted
2	Hubert Kah	55	80es pop icon	6th – Evicted
2	Alexandra Rietz	43	Actress	7th – Evicted
2	Mia Julia Brückner	27	Porn star / Ballermann performer	8th – Evicted
2	Liz Baffoe	44	Soap actress	9th – Evicted
2	Ela Tas	22	Reality TV contestant	10th – Evicted
2	Mario-Max Prinz zu Schaumburg-Lippe	36	Royalty	11th – Evicted
2	Janina Youssefian	33	Model	12th – Evicted
3	David Odonkor	31	Former football player	1st – Winner
3	Menowin Fröhlich	27	Singer	2nd – Runner-up
3	Nino de Angelo	51	Singer	3rd – Third place
3	Sarah Nowak	24	Model, Playboy Playmate	4th – Evicted
3	Julia Jasmin 'JJ' Rühle	28	Actress, singer	5th – Evicted
3	Désirée Nick	58	Actress, author	6th – Evicted
3	Nina Kristin Fiutak	33	Model, Singer and Actress	7th – Evicted
3	Anja Schüte	50	Actress	8th – Evicted
3	Wilfried Gliem	68	Singer	9th – Walked
3	Judith Hildebrandt	38	Actress, singer and presenter	10th – Evicted
3	Michael Ammer	54	VIP party promoter	11th – Evicted
3	Daniel Köllerer	32	Former tennis player	12th – Evicted
4	Ben Tewaag	40	Actor	1st – Winner
4	Cathy Lugner	26	Playmate and wife of Richard Lugner	2nd – Runner-up
4	Mario Basler	47	Former football player	3rd – Third place
4	Natascha Ochsenknecht	52	Actress and former wife of Uwe Ochsenknecht	4th – Evicted
4	Jessica Paszka	26	Model and reality TV personality	5th – Evicted
4	Frank Stäbler	27	Olympic Wrestler	6th – Evicted
4	Joachim Witt	68	Singer	7th – Evicted
4	Isa Jank	64	Actress	8th – Evicted
4	Marcus Prinz von Anhalt	49	Adoptive Prince, former night club owner	9th – Evicted
4	Robin Bade	35	Former call-in game show host	10th – Evicted
4	Stephen Dürr	42	Actor	11th – Evicted
4	Dolly Dollar	54	Actress	12th – Evicted
4	Edona James	29	Reality TV Personality, erotic model, and DJ	13th – Ejected
5	Jens Hilbert	39	Entrepreneur	1st – Winner
5	Milo Moiré	34	Nude artist	2nd – Runner-up
5	Willi Herren	42	Actor	3rd – Third place
5	Dominik Bruntner	24	Model	4th – Evicted
5	Eloy de Jong	44	Boy band Caught in the Act member	5th – Evicted
5	Evelyn Burdecki	28	The Bachelor participant	6th – Evicted
5	Steffen von der Beeck	43	Media consultant	7th – Evicted
5	Sarah Kern	48	Fashion designer	8th – Evicted
5	Claudia Obert	55	Fashion designer	9th – Evicted
5	Sarah Knappik	30	Model	10th – Evicted
5	Zachi Noy	64	Actor	11th – Evicted
5	Maria Hering	30	Singer, actress and fitness blogger	12th – Evicted
6	Silvia Wollny	53	Star of the reality docu-soap Die Wollnys	1st – Winner
6	Chethrin Schulze	26	Participant on Love Island Germany	2nd – Runner-up
6	Alphonso Williams	56	DSDS season 14 winner	3rd – Third place
6	Daniel Völz	33	Bachelor of the 8th season of Der Bachelor	4th – Evicted
6	Johannes Haller	30	Die Bachelorette Runner-up	5th – Evicted
6	Katja Krasavice	22	YouTube personality	6th – Evicted
6	Cora Schumacher	41	Ex-wife of Ralf Schumacher	7th – Evicted
6	Umut Kekilli	34	Football player	8th – Evicted
6	Nicole Belstler-Boettcher	55	Soap actress	9th – Evicted
6	Mike Shiva	54	Fortuneteller	10th – Evicted
6	Pascal Behrenbruch	33	Former decathlete, European Champion 2012	11th – Evicted
6	Sophia Vegas	30	Reality TV personality	12th – Walked
6	Karl-Heinz Richard von Sayn-Wittgenstein	64	Businessman, Reality TV personality	13th – Walked
7	Janine Meissner	32	Actress	1st – Winner
7	Joey Heindle	26	Singer	2nd – Runner-up
7	Tobias Wegener	26	TV personality	3rd – Third place
7	Theresia Fischer	26	Model	4th – Evicted
7	Almklausi	50	Singer	5th – Evicted
7	Lilo von Kiesenwetter	65	Clairvoyance	6th – Evicted
7	Sylvia Leifheit	43	Actress and Model	7th – Evicted
7	Christos Manazidis	32	YouTuber	8th – Evicted
7	Ginger Costello Wollersheim	33	Wife of Bert Wollersheim	9th – Evicted
7	Jürgen Trovato	57	TV detective	10th – Evicted
7	Zlatko Trpkovski	43	BB1 housemate	11th – Evicted
7	Eva Benetatou	27	TV personality	12th – Evicted
8	Werner Hansch	81	Sports commentator	1st – Winner
8	Mischa Mayer	28	TV personality	2nd – Runner-up
8	Kathy Kelly	57	Musician	3rd – Third place
8	Ikke Hüftgold	43	Singer	4th – Evicted
8	Emmy Russ	21	TV personality	5th – Evicted
8	Katy Bähm	26	Drag queen	6th – Evicted
8	Simone Mecky-Ballack	44	TV personality, model	7th – Evicted
8	Ramin Abtin	38	Kickboxing champion	8th – Evicted
8	Aaron Königs	25	TV personality	9th – Evicted
8	Sascha Heyna	45	Shopping channel host, singer	10th – Evicted
8	Adela Smajić	27	TV personality	11th – Evicted
8	Udo Bönstrup	25	Comedian, YouTuber	12th – Evicted
8	Elene Lucia Ameur	26	Actress	13th – Walked
8	Alessia-Millane Herren	18	TV personality	14th – Evicted
8	Jasmin Tawil	38	Actress	15th – Evicted
8	Senay Güler	44	DJ, model, actor	16th – Walked
8	Jenny Frankhauser	27	TV personality	17th – Walked
8	Claudia Kohde-Kilsch	56	Former tennis player	18th – Evicted
9	Melanie Müller	33	Reality TV star	1st – Winner
9	Uwe Abel	51	Participant on Bauer sucht Frau	2nd – Runner-up
9	Danny Liedtke	31	Scripted reality actor	3rd – Third place
9	Papis Loveday	44	Model	4th – Evicted
9	Marie Lang	34	Kickboxer	5th – Evicted
9	Ina Aogo	32	Influencer, wife of Dennis Aogo	6th – Evicted
9	Daniela Büchner	43	Reality TV actress	7th – Evicted
9	Eric Sindermann	33	Handball player, fashion designer, reality TV contestant	8th – Evicted
9	Paco Steinbeck	46	Antique's dealer	9th – Evicted
9	Jörg Draeger	75	Game show host	10th – Evicted
9	Gitta Saxx	56	Model	11th – Evicted
9	Payton Pamolla	21	Influencer	12th – Evicted
9	Barbara "Babs" Kijewski		Professional fisher, influencer	13th – Evicted
9	Pascal Kappés	31	Scripted reality actor, model	14th – Evicted
9	Rafi Rachek	31	Die Bachelorette contestant	15th – Evicted
9	Mimi Gwozdz	27	Der Bachelor winner	16th – Walked
9	Heike Maurer	68	TV presenter	17th – Evicted
9	Daniel Kreibich	37	Clairvoyant	18th – Walked
10	Rainer Gottwald	56	Boxing promoter	1st – Winner
10	Micaela Schäfer	39	Nude model, TV presenter	2nd – Runner-up
10	Sam Dylan	31	TV personality	3rd – Third place
10	Menderes Bağcı	39	Musician, reality TV star	4th – Evicted
10	Jay Khan	41	Singer	5th – Evicted
10	Katy Karrenbauer	59	Actress	6th – Evicted
10	Jennifer Iglesias	24	TV personality	7th – Evicted
10	Doreen Steinert	36	Singer	8th – Evicted
10	Tanja Tischewitsch	33	TV personality	9th – Evicted
10	Jörg Knör	63	Comedian	10th – Evicted
10	Walentina Doronina	22	TV personality	11th – Evicted
10	Catrin Heyne	38	TV personality	12th – Evicted
10	Jörg Dahlmann	63	Football commentator	13th – Evicted
10	Diana Schell	52	Shopping channel presenter	14th – Evicted
10	Jeremy Fragrance	33	Influencer	15th – Walked
10	Patrick Hufen	52	Insurance detective	16th – Walked
11	Yeliz Koc	30	Reality TV personality	1st – Winner
11	Marco Strecker	21	Influencer	2nd – Runner-up
11	Peter Klein	56	Reality TV personality	3rd – Third place
11	Paulina Ljubas	26	Reality TV personality	4th – Evicted
11	Matthias Mangiapane	40	Reality TV personality	5th – Evicted
11	Dilara Kruse	32	Wife of footballer Max Kruse	6th – Evicted
11	Dominik Stockmann	31	Bachelor on Der Bachelor 2022	7th – Evicted
11	Iris Klein	56	Reality TV personality	8th – Evicted
11	Manuela Wisbeck	40	Reality TV personality	9th – Evicted
11	Ron Bielecki	25	Influencer	10th – Evicted
11	Jürgen Milski	59	Singer, reality TV personality	11th – Evicted
11	Philo Kotnik	41	Magician	12th – Evicted
11	Patricia Blanco	52	Daughter of Roberto Blanco, reality TV personality	13th – Evicted

=== Notes ===
- Ages at the time the housemate entered the house

== Guests ==
On some occasions, celebrities have entered the house for a short period of time as guests.

Series	Celebrity	Notability	Period	Ref(s)
1	Pamela Anderson	Model, actress	Days 12–15	
4	Richard Lugner	Former political candidate	Day 5	
7	Silvia Wollny	TV personality and season 6 winner	Day 7	
