= Promi Big Brother season 1 =

Season of the German television series Promi Big Brother

Promi Big Brother
- Season 1
- Presented by: Cindy aus Marzahn; Oliver Pocher
- No. of days: 15
- No. of contestants: 13
- Winner: Jenny Elvers-Elbertzhagen
- Runner-up: Natalia Osada
- Companion shows: Promi Big Brother – Die Webshow; Promi Big Brother Inside
- No. of episodes: 15

Release
- Original network: Sat.1
- Original release: 13 September – 27 September 2013

Season chronology
- Next → Season 2

The first series of Promi Big Brother began on 13 September 2013 and ended on 27 September 2013. It is the first series of the Big Brother franchise on Sat.1, after it left RTL II, and the first in Germany after a 2-year hiatus. 12 housemates ("promis") entered the house on Day 1 with one more joining during the series. The show is co-hosted by Cindy aus Marzahn and Oliver Pocher.

== Format ==
Promi's had participated in tasks and matches for treats or to avoid punishments. Daily nominations also took place (from Day 8 to 14).

== House ==
Promi Big Brother has its own Diary Room called "The Consultation Room". The Consultation Room is where Promi's can talk to Big Brother in private if ever they feel upset, lonely, angry or in seek of help and advice. Much of the house seems to have a similar design to that of the eighth series of Celebrity Big Brother UK. The bedroom was based on a forest theme just like the fifth series of Big Brother UK. The bedroom has secret storage cupboards hidden behind the walls. The garden has a swimming pool with a small boat floating in it. There is also a lifeguard chair next to the pool in homage to Promi David Hasselhoff and his previous role in Baywatch.

== Promis ==
In Promi Big Brother, the celebrities are called "Promis" rather than the traditional "Housemates" that had been used in the previous 11 series of normal Big Brother Germany. Originally 12 Promi's entered the house on Day 1.

On Day 5, David was given news by Big Brother that his father was ill. David decided to walk from the house later that evening to be with his father. On Day 7, Georgina entered the house as a replacement Promi for David. On Day 8, Sarah Joelle walked from the house after receiving bad news from Big Brother about her family.

Celebrity	Age on entry	Notability	Day entered	Day exited	Status
Jenny Elvers	41	Actress	1	15	Winner
Natalia Osada	23	Reality TV contestant (heritage from Russia)	1	15	Runner-up
Marijke Amado	59	TV host (originally from Belgium)	1	15	Third place
Simon Desue	22	Internet star (heritage from Ivory Coast)	1	15	Fourth place
Martin Semmelrogge	57	Actor	1	15	Fifth place
Manuel Charr	28	Boxer (heritage from Syria)	1	14	Evicted
Fancy	67	Singer	1	13	Evicted
Georgina Fleur	23	Reality TV star (heritage from United Kingdom)	7	12	Evicted
Jan Leyk	28	Reality TV star (heritage from Spain)	1	11	Evicted
Lucy Diakovska	37	Singer (originally from Bulgaria)	1	10	Evicted
Percival Duke	42	Singer (originally from United States)	1	8	Evicted
Sarah Joelle Jahnel	24	Singer (heritage from Africa)	1	8	Walked
David Hasselhoff	61	Actor (originally from United States)	1	5	Walked

=== Houseguests ===
On Day 12 Pamela Anderson entered the house, as a Special Guest Star, staying until the final day.

== Nominations Table ==
	Day 8	Day 9	Day 10	Day 11	Day 12	Day 13	Day 14	Day 15 Final		Nominations received
Jenny	Lucy	Georgina	Lucy	Natalia	Natalia	Natalia	Simon, Martin	Winner (Day 15)		1
Natalia	In Secret Loft	Georgina	Lucy	Manuel	Georgina	Manuel	Manuel, Martin	Runner-Up (Day 15)		13
Marijke	Jan	Jan	Lucy	Jan	Fancy	Fancy	Manuel, Simon	Third place (Day 15)		18
Simon	Marijke	Marijke	Marijke	Marijke	Marijke	Marijke	Martin, Marijke	Fourth place (Day 15)		5
Martin	Lucy	Lucy	Lucy	Simon	Simon	Natalia	Natalia, Simon	Fifth place (Day 15)		3
Manuel	Fancy	Natalia	Marijke	Marijke	Marijke	Natalia	Natalia, Marijke	Evicted (Day 14)		4
Fancy	Lucy	Lucy	Marijke	Marijke	Georgina	Marijke	Evicted (Day 13)			3
Georgina	Percival	Natalia	Lucy	Natalia	Natalia	Evicted (Day 12)				4
Jan	Marijke	Marijke	Marijke	Marijke	Evicted (Day 11)					3
Lucy	Percival	Natalia	Jenny	Evicted (Day 10)						11
Percival	Lucy	Evicted (Day 8)								2
Sarah	Walked (Day 8)									N/A
David	Walked (Day 5)									N/A
Up for Eviction	Lucy, Marijke, Percival	Lucy, Marijke		Jan, Manuel, Marijke, Natalia, Simon	Fancy, Georgina, Marijke, Natalia, Simon	Fancy, Marijke, Natalia	Manuel, Marijke, Martin, Natalia, Simon	Jenny, Marijke, Martin, Natalia, Simon		
Notes				none			none			
Walked	David; Sarah	none								
Evicted	Percival; 68.23% to evict	Lucy; 69% to evict		Jan; 51.20% to evict	Georgina; 38.62% to evict	Fancy; 39.83% to evict	Manuel; 75.72% to evict	Martin; 7.73% (out of 5)	Simon; 12.85% (out of 4)	
Evicted	Percival; 68.23% to evict	Lucy; 69% to evict		Jan; 51.20% to evict	Georgina; 38.62% to evict	Fancy; 39.83% to evict	Manuel; 75.72% to evict	Marijke; 21.34% (out of 3)	Natalia; 28.52% (out of 2)	
Evicted	Percival; 68.23% to evict	Lucy; 69% to evict		Jan; 51.20% to evict	Georgina; 38.62% to evict	Fancy; 39.83% to evict	Manuel; 75.72% to evict	Jenny; 71.48% to win		

=== Notes ===
- ^1 Georgina cannot be nominated after one day in the house. Natalia is exempt from being nominated because she was being fake evicted by Big Brother to live in a secret loft for the next 24 hours.
- ^2 The result of Day 9's and Day 10's nomination will be added together and one housemate will be evicted on Day 10.
- ^3 Fancy, Manuel, Marijke & Natalia were nominated. Pamela Anderson could save one of the nominees. She chose Manuel.

=== Nominations: Results ===
Days	Nominated	Evicted
Day 8	Percival (68.23%), Marijke (16.79%), Lucy (14.97%)	David, Sarah Joelle (Walked), Percival
Day 10	Lucy (69%), Marijke (31%)	Lucy
Day 11	Jan (51.20%), Marijke (17.08%), Manuel (16.02%), Simon (10.71%), Natalia (4.99%)	Jan
Day 12	Georgina (38.62%), Simon (22.11%), Marijke (18.73%), Fancy (11.79%), Natalia (8.75%)	Georgina
Day 13	Fancy (39.83%), Marijke (31.62%), Natalia (28.55%)	Fancy
Day 14	Manuel (75.72%), Marijke (8.13%), Martin (7.12%), Natalia (5.89%), Simon (3.14%)	Manuel
FINAL	Jenny (?%), Marijke (?%), Natalia (?%), Simon (?%), Martin (7.73%)	Martin
FINAL	Jenny (?%), Marijke (?%), Natalia (?%), Simon (12.85%)	Simon
FINAL	Jenny (?%), Natalia (?%), Marijke (21.34%)	Marijke
FINAL	Jenny (71.48%), Natalia (28.52%)	Natalia
