= Promi Big Brother season 5 =

Promi Big Brother
- Season 5
- Presented by: Jochen Schropp; Jochen Bendel
- No. of days: 17
- No. of contestants: 12
- Winner: Jens Hilbert
- Runner-up: Milo Moiré
- Companion shows: Promi Big Brother – Die Late Night Show; Promi Big Brother – Warm Up
- No. of episodes: 15

Release
- Original network: Sat.1
- Original release: 11 August – 25 August 2017

Season chronology
- ← Previous; Season 4 Next → Season 6

The fifth series of Promi Big Brother (also known as Promi Big Brother – Alles oder Nichts) started on 11 August 2017. It is the fifth series of the Big Brother franchise on Sat.1, after it left RTL II.

Jochen Schropp and Jochen Bendel co-host this season. Jens Hilbert was the winner.

== Format ==
Promis had participated in tasks and matches for treats or to avoid punishments. Daily nominations also took place (from Day 10 to 16). Furthermore, the house consists of two areas, the luxurious area and the poor area. Housemates on the luxurious area will choose of the poor housemates to join them, whilst the public will vote one of them move to poor area.

== House ==
This year's Promi Big Brother contains two areas: the luxurious Everything area, and the poor Nothing area. Each area having their separate living areas, bathrooms, bedrooms and diary rooms. The Everything area will be luxurious, whilst the Nothing area is meager with no beds or real seating. Both areas are on the same level.

== Housemates ==
Celebrity	Age on entry	Notability	Day entered	Day exited	Status
Jens Hilbert	39	Entrepreneur	1	17	Winner
Milo Moiré	34	Nude artist	1	17	Runner-up
Willi Herren	42	Lindenstraße actor and I'm a celebrity - Get me out of here! contestant	1	17	3rd Place
Dominik Bruntner	24	Model, Mister Germany 2017	1	17	4th Place
Eloy de Jong	44	Boy band Caught in the Act member	1	16	Evicted
Evelyn Burdecki	28	The Bachelor participant	1	15	Evicted
Steffen von der Beeck	43	Media consultant, former fiancé of Jenny Elvers	1	14	Evicted
Sarah Kern	48	Fashion designer	1	13	Evicted
Claudia Obert	55	Fashion designer	1	13	Evicted
Sarah Knappik	30	Model, Germany's Next Topmodel and I'm a celebrity - Get me out of here! contestant	1	11	Evicted
Zachi Noy	64	Actor	1	10	Evicted
Maria Hering	30	Singer, actress, fitness blogger and former partner of Bastian Yotta	1	10	Evicted

== Distribution of housemates ==
As in the last three seasons, the participants were distributed before the broadcast of the show by the producers in the respective areas. From the first show, the participants and the audience could change the distribution of the housemates in each case by voting and using the Duel Arena.

Areas and Housemates
Date	Everything area Housemates	Nothing area Housemates	Reason
9 August and 10 August 2017	All housemates moved in the Nothing area on the 9 August 2017.		
9 August and 10 August 2017	None	Claudia; Dominik; Eloy; Evelyn; Jens; Maria; Milo; Sarah Knappik; Steffen; Sarah Kern; Willi; Zachi	
11 August 2017	Willi and Eloy moved from Nothing area to Everything area.		Public vote
11 August 2017	Zachi moved from Nothing area to Everything area.		Live Duell
11 August 2017	Dominik moved from Nothing area to Everything area.		Duell
11 August 2017	Eloy ▲ Willi ▲ Zachi ▲ Dominik ▲	Claudia; Evelyn; Jens; Maria; Milo; Sarah Kern; Sarah Knappik; Steffen	
12 August 2017	Sarah Knappik moved from Nothing area to Everything area.		Duell
12 August 2017	Eloy; Willi; Zachi; Dominik; Sarah Knappik ▲	Claudia; Evelyn; Jens; Maria; Milo; Sarah Kern; Steffen	
13 August 2017	Eloy; Willi; Zachi; Dominik; Sarah Knappik	Claudia; Evelyn; Jens; Maria; Milo; Sarah Kern; Steffen	
14 August 2017	Willi, Zachi, Eloy, Sarah Knappik and Dominik moved from Everything area to Nothing area.		Reward by Big Brother
14 August 2017	Claudia, Steffen, Jens, Maria and Milo moved from Nothing area to Everything area.		Reward by Big Brother
14 August 2017	Claudia ▲ Steffen ▲ Jens ▲ Maria ▲ Milo ▲	Evelyn; Sarah Kern; Willi ▼ Zachi ▼ Eloy ▼ Sarah Knappik ▼ Dominik ▼	
15 August 2017	Claudia; Steffen; Jens; Maria; Milo	Evelyn; Sarah Kern; Willi; Zachi; Eloy; Sarah Knappik; Dominik	
16. August 2017	Sarah Knappik moved from Nothing area to Everything area.		Live Duell
16. August 2017	Claudia moved from Everything area to Nothing area.		Live Duell
16. August 2017	Steffen; Jens; Maria; Milo; Sarah Knappik ▲	Evelyn; Sarah Kern; Willi; Zachi; Eloy; Dominik; Claudia ▼	
17. August 2017	Steffen; Jens; Maria; Milo; Sarah Knappik	Evelyn; Sarah Kern; Willi; Zachi; Eloy; Dominik; Claudia	
18 August 2017	Maria was evicted from the house before the live duel.		Public vote
18 August 2017	Steffen, Jens, Milo and Sarah Knappik moved from Everything area to Nothing area.		Live Duell
18 August 2017	Evelyn, Sarah Kern, Willi, Zachi, Eloy, Dominik and Claudia moved from Nothing area to Everything area.		Live Duell
18 August 2017	Zachi was evicted from the house after the live duel.		Public vote
18 August 2017	Evelyn ▲ Sarah Kern ▲ Willi ▲ ~~Zachi~~ ▲ Eloy ▲ Dominik ▲ Claudia ▲	Steffen ▼ Jens ▼ ~~Maria~~ ▼ Milo ▼ Sarah Knappik ▼	Maria and Zachi both received the fewest votes and were evicted from the house.
19 August 2017	Sarah Kern and Dominik moved from Everything area to Nothing area.		Live Duell
19 August 2017	Steffen and Milo moved from Nothing area to Everything area.		Live Duell
19 August 2017	Sarah Knappik was evicted from the house after the live duel.		Public vote
19 August 2017	Evelyn; Willi; Eloy; Claudia; Steffen ▲ Milo ▲	Jens; ~~Sarah Knappik~~; Dominik ▼ Sarah Kern ▼	Sarah Knappik received the fewest votes and was evicted from the house.
20 August 2017	Eloy moved from Everything area to Nothing area.		Live Duell
20 August 2017	Evelyn; Willi; Claudia; Steffen; Milo	Jens; Dominik; Sarah Kern; Eloy ▼	
21 August 2017	Claudia was evicted from the house before the live duel.		Public vote
21 August 2017	Steffen and Milo moved from Everything area to Nothing area.		Live Duell
21 August 2017	Sarah Kern was evicted from the house after the live duel.		Public vote
21 August 2017	Evelyn; Willi; ~~Claudia~~	Jens; Dominik; ~~Sarah Kern~~; Eloy; Steffen ▼ Milo ▼	Claudia and Sarah Kern both received the fewest votes and were evicted from the house.
22 August 2017	Steffen was evicted from the house before the live duel.		Public vote
22 August 2017	Evelyn; Willi	Jens; Dominik; Eloy; ~~Steffen~~; Milo	Steffen received the fewest votes and was evicted from the house.
23 August 2017	Willi moved from Everything area to Nothing area.		Live Duell
23 August 2017	Eloy moved from Nothing area to Everything area.		Live Duell
23 August 2017	Evelyn was evicted from the house after the live duel.		Public vote
23 August 2017	~~Evelyn~~; Eloy	Jens; Dominik; Milo; Willi	Evelyn received the fewest votes and was evicted from the house.
24 August 2017	Jens, Dominik, Milo and Willi moved from Nothing area to Everything area.		Public vote
24 August 2017	Eloy was evicted from the house after the live duel.		Public vote
24 August 2017	~~Eloy~~; Jens ▲ Dominik ▲ Milo ▲ Willi ▲		Eloy received the fewest votes and was evicted from the house.

== Duel Arena ==
As in the previous duels between the Duels also took place this year. Big Brother (voiced by Phil Daub) each appoint one or two residents from the "area" who must compete at the Duel Arena. In the Duel Arena they both played a game and the loser must face the consequences for his living area. A draw always win the inhabitants in the "luxury area". The duels each can either have a positive impact on the winners section or consequences for the loser section. So must for example, the losing team changing areas, receives less food or have to give personal items.

Duels
Date	Everything area Housemates	Nothing area Housemates	Game	Winner	Consequence
11 August 2017		Claudia (for Sarah Knappik) 1 Dominik (for Zachi) 2	"Balla Balla"	Dominik	Reward: Zachi will live in Everything area.
12 August 2017		Claudia; Dominik; Evelyn; Jens; Maria; Milo; Sarah Kern; Steffen	"Ice Age"	Dominik	Reward: Dominik will live in Everything area.
13 August 2017		Team Blue: Evelyn; Milo; Sarah Kern	"Short and Small"	Team White: Sarah Knappik; Maria; Claudia	Reward: Sarah Knappk will live in Everything area.
13 August 2017		Team White: Sarah Knappik; Maria; Claudia	"Short and Small"	Team White: Sarah Knappik; Maria; Claudia	Reward: Sarah Knappk will live in Everything area.
13 August 2017	Dominik	Jens	"Quiz Fall"	Dominik	Reward: Dominik will remain in Everything area.
15 August 2017	Claudia	Willi	"Abgezockt"	Claudia	Reward: Claudia will remain in Everything area.
16 August 2017	Claudia	Sarah Knappik	"Banquet"	Sarah Knappik	Reward: Sarah Knappik will live in Everything area.
17 August 2017	Steffen (Supporters: Maria and Milo)	Willi (Supporters: Eloy and Dominik)	"Bondage Football"	Steffen	Reward: Steffen will remain in Everything area.
18 August 2017	Jens; Steffen	Dominik; Willi	Pennant, traverse	Dominik; Willi	Reward/Punishment: The team of the winning housemates will live in Everything area, the team of the losing housemates will live in Nothing area.
19 August 2017	Dominik; Sarah Kern	Steffen; Milo	Unicorn Piñata	Steffen; Milo	Reward: Steffen and Milo will live in Everything area.
20 August 2017	Eloy		"Melones damaged" (versus Michael Smolik)	Michael Smolik	Punishment: Eloy will live in Nothing area.
21 August 2017	Team Blue: Steffen; Milo			Team White: Willi; Evelyn	Punishment: Steffen and Milo will live in Nothing area.
21 August 2017	Team White: Willi; Evelyn			Team White: Willi; Evelyn	Punishment: Steffen and Milo will live in Nothing area.
22 August 2017	Evelyn; Willi	Milo; Dominik	"The large saws"	Evelyn; Willi	Reward: Evelyn and Willi will remain in Everything area.
23 August 2017	Willi	Eloy	"Climbing Wall"	Eloy	Reward: Eloy will live in Everything area.
24 August 2017		Dominik; Jens; Milo; Eloy; Willi	"Dosenwerfen"	Willi	Reward: Willi is the first finalist.

^1 : Sarah Knappik was chosen by the viewers, but she could not participate for health reasons. Instead, Claudia participated for her.
^2 : Zachi was chosen by the viewers, but he could not participate for health reasons. Instead, Dominik participated for him.

== Nominations table ==
– Everything Housemates after week 1
– Nothing Housemates after week 1
– This round of nominations were to save.

	Day 10		Day 11	Day 12	Day 13	Day 14	Day 15	Day 16	Day 17 Final		Nominations received
	#1	#2	Day 11	Day 12	Day 13	Day 14	Day 15	Day 16	Day 17 Final		Nominations received
Jens	No; Nominations	Steffen	Sarah Knappik	Eloy	Dominik	Steffen, Eloy	Evelyn	Eloy	Winner (Day 17)		10
Milo	No; Nominations	Steffen	Claudia	Claudia	Steffen	Eloy, Willi	Evelyn	Eloy	Runner-up (Day 17)		5
Willi	No; Nominations	Zachi	Sarah Knappik	Claudia	Eloy	Steffen, Jens	Milo	Milo	Third place (Day 17)		1
Willi	No; Nominations	Zachi	Sarah Knappik	Claudia	Eloy	Steffen, Jens	Jens	Milo	Third place (Day 17)		1
Dominik	No; Nominations	Zachi	Steffen	Sarah Kern	Eloy	Steffen, Jens	Evelyn	Milo	Fourth place (Day 17)		1
Eloy	No; Nominations	Zachi	Sarah Knappik	Jens	Willi	Steffen, Jens	Jens	Jens	Evicted (Day 16)		7
Evelyn	No; Nominations	Zachi	Sarah Knappik	Claudia	Willi	Jens, Steffen	Jens	Evicted (Day 15)			4
Steffen	No; Nominations	Zachi	Sarah Knappik	Claudia	Jens	Eloy, Dominik	Evicted (Day 14)				11
Sarah Kern	No; Nominations	Zachi	Steffen	Eloy	Dominik	Evicted (Day 13)					1
Claudia	No; Nominations	Steffen	Milo	Milo	Evicted (Day 13)						5
Sarah Knappik	No; Nominations	Zachi	Evelyn	Evicted (Day 11)							5
Zachi	No; Nominations	Steffen	Evicted (Day 10)								7
Maria	No; Nominations	Evicted (Day 10)									N/A
Nomination notes	none	1	none	2	3	1	4, 5	6	7		
Against public vote	All Housemates	Steffen, Zachi	Sarah Knappik, Steffen	Claudia, Eloy	Evelyn, Milo, Sarah Kern	Jens, Steffen	Evelyn, Milo, Jens	Eloy, Milo	Dominik, Jens, Milo, Willi		
Evicted	Maria; Fewest votes to save	Zachi; Fewest votes to save	Sarah Knappik; Fewest votes to save	Claudia; Fewest votes to save	Sarah Kern; Fewest votes to save	Steffen; Fewest votes to save	Evelyn; Fewest votes to save	Eloy; 49.94 % to save	Dominik; Fewest votes (out of 4)	Willi; Fewest votes (out of 3)	
Evicted	Maria; Fewest votes to save	Zachi; Fewest votes to save	Sarah Knappik; Fewest votes to save	Claudia; Fewest votes to save	Sarah Kern; Fewest votes to save	Steffen; Fewest votes to save	Evelyn; Fewest votes to save	Eloy; 49.94 % to save	Milo; 35.9% (out of 2)	Jens; 64.1% to win	

=== Notes ===
- ^Note 1 : All female housemates were immune from nomination.
- ^Note 2 : Housemates were only allowed to nominate people in their living area. The housemate with the most votes from each living area will face the public vote.
- ^Note 3 : Housemates had to choose a housemate to save from the public vote rather than nominate. The housemate with the fewest votes to be save would be nominated.
- ^Note 4 : Eloy won the live duel on 23 August. As a reward, he won immunity which he could transfer to another housemate. He chose to give Dominik immunity.
- ^Note 5 : Willi lost the live duel on 23 August. He received a killer nomination which could transfer to another housemate. He chose to killer nominate Milo.
- ^Note 6 : Willi became the first finalist after winning the duel on Day 16.
- ^Note 7 : The public were voting to win rather than to save.

== Ratings ==
Ratings
Episode	Viewers (in millions)			Share (in %)		
Episode	Total	14 - 49 Years	14 - 59 Years	Total	14 - 49 Years	14 - 59 Years
1	2.07	1.01	1.47	8.2%	13.0%	11.3%
2	1.63	0.82	1.16	7.3%	10.7%	9.4%
3	1.36	0.61	0.94	7.2%	8.7%	8.5%
4	1.61	0.66	1.05	8.8%	10.8%	10.4%
5	1.83	0.82	1.28	10.2%	12.5%	12.4%
6	1.71	0.78	1.21	9.7%	12.6%	12.2%
7	1.88	0.87	1.24	10.6%	13.5%	12.1%
8	2.06	1.08	1.48	10.4%	15.3%	13.2%
9	1.92	0.92	1.32	9.6%	13.8%	12.0%
10	1.59	0.76	1.05	8.9%	11.8%	10.2%
11	1.95	0.93	1.36	11.5%	15.8%	14.1%
12	1.77	0.79	1.18	10.8%	13.8%	12.7%
13	1.75	0.79	1.20	10.2%	13.1%	12.6%
14	1.86	0.88	1.28	11.1%	14.8%	13.4%
15	2.11	0.99		9.0%	13.7%	
