= Promi Big Brother season 7 =

Promi Big Brother
- Season 7
- Presented by: Jochen Schropp; Marlene Lufen
- No. of days: 17
- No. of contestants: 12
- Winner: Janine Meissner
- Runner-up: Joey Heindle
- Companion shows: Promi Big Brother – Die Late Night Show; Promi Big Brother – Das jüngste Gerücht; Promi Big Brother – Watch Together; Promi Big Brother – Raffas Recap
- No. of episodes: 15

Release
- Original network: Sat.1
- Original release: 9 August – 23 August 2019

Additional information
- Filming dates: 7 August – 23 August 2019

Season chronology
- ← Previous; Season 6 Next → Season 8

Promi Big Brother 2019, also known as Promi Big Brother 7, was the seventh season of the German reality television series Promi Big Brother. The show began airing on 9 August 2019 on Sat.1 and ended after 17 days on 23 August 2019. It is the seventh season of the Big Brother franchise in total to air on Sat.1 to date. Jochen Schropp and Marlene Lufen both returned as hosts of the show.

Janine Meissner was announced as the winner of the season, with Joey Heindle as the runner-up.

== Production ==
=== Eye logo ===
The eye was released on 26 June 2019 and features a design from the British version. From the United Kingdom, Promi Big Brother has now adopted the idea of putting a star in the center of the eye.

=== Teasers ===
On 19 July 2019, a forty-seconds teaser was released promoting the season.

=== Opening Intro ===
The song of this year intro and outro is "An guten Tagen" from Johannes Oerding. Like the previous season, the intro for the matches is "The Hanging Tree" from James Newton Howard feat. Jennifer Lawrence.

=== House ===
The official house pictures were released on 8 August 2019. As in previous seasons, the Promi Big Brother house features two sides. "Alles" or Everything is a luxury summer escape where the housemates can enjoy food and relax without a care in the world. "Nichts" or Nothing has limited supplies, rough sleeping arrangements, and a harsh environment to survive in.

This year there is an overall theme for the house which is Camping. There is not an actual "house". Both sides of the compound feature and open air environment leaving the housemates exposed to the elements.

The luxury camp features a modern "glamping" style, including a kitchen with fridge and oven, beds, spacious safari style tents and a hot tub. The poor side however modeled after a run down campsite, with backpackers tents, sleeping bags, no food and a cold shower.

== Twists ==
=== Move In ===
The first 9 housemates moved in on Wednesday, August 7 two days before the live show. All 9 moved into the campsite area of the house and were only allowed to choose one personal item to bring with them. Big Brother provided the housemates with a basic care kit including toiletries, a sleeping bag, and a mat. On the 1st live show on August 9, Almklausi, Sylvia, and Zlatko moved into the house.

=== Returning Players ===
On Day 3, Big Brother Germany 1 housemate Zlatko Trpkovski entered the house after over a decade of being away from the media.

=== Shopping Challenges ===
Each day the "Nothing" housemates will receive €1 per person per day for shopping. Big Brother will give tasks and challenges in order to earn extra money to spend in the shopping center located in the house. The housemates will only receive 60 seconds of shopping time to buy items with their shopping budget.

== Housemates ==
On August 6, 2019, were announced the first nine celebrities housemates to be participating in the season were Christos, Eva, Ginger, Janine, Joey, Jürgen, Lilo, Tobias and Theresia. Sylvia was announced the next day as the tenth celebrity housemate. The eleventh celebrity housemate was announced on August 8, it was Zlatko. The twelfth and final celebrity housemate was announced on launch day, it was Almklausi.

On August 7, 2019, nine out of twelve housemates entered the Big Brother house before the broadcast of the show. On August 9, 2019, the last three housemates entered the house.

Celebrity	Age on entry	Notability	Day entered	Day exited	Status
Janine Meissner	32	Actress	1	17	Winner
Joey Heindle	26	Singer	1	17	Runner-up
Tobias Wegener	26	TV personality	1	17	3rd Place
Theresia Fischer	26	Model	1	17	4th Place
Almklausi	50	Singer	3	16	Evicted
Lilo von Kiesenwetter	65	Clairvoyance	1	15	Evicted
Sylvia Leifheit	43	Actress and Model	3	14	Evicted
Christos Manazidis	32	YouTuber	1	13	Evicted
Ginger Costello Wollersheim	33	Wife of Bert Wollersheim	1	13	Evicted
Jürgen Trovato	57	TV detective	1	12	Evicted
Zlatko Trpkovski	43	BB1 housemate	3	11	Evicted
Eva Benetatou	27	TV personality	1	10	Evicted

=== Almklausi ===
Almklausi (born April 5, 1969), is a German Singer. He entered the House on Day 3. He became the eighth housemate to be evicted on Day 16.

=== Christos Manazidis ===
Christos "Chris" Manazidis (born October 2, 1986), is a German YouTuber. His YouTube-Channel name is "Bullshit-TV" and thrills more than 1.8 million subscribers. He entered the House on Day 1. He became the fifth housemate to be evicted on Day 13.

=== Eva Benetatou ===
Eva Benetatou (born April 6, 1992), is a German reality television personality. She began her career after placing second on the 2019 season of Der Bachelor. She entered the House on Day 1. She became the first housemate to be evicted on Day 10.

=== Ginger Costello Wollersheim ===
Ginger Costello Wollersheim (born June 17, 1986), was a stripper and now is a webcam girl, known as the wife of television personality Bert Wollersheim. She entered the House on Day 1. She became the fourth housemate to be evicted on Day 13.

=== Janine Meissner ===
Janine "Pink" Meissner (born April 8, 1987), is an actress. She began her career as "Yvonne Voss" in the soap Köln 50667. After five years with Köln 50667 it was time for a change of scenery. The character "Yvonne" stayed, but in the new show Leben.Lieben.Leipzig, which was designed especially for Meissner in the lead role. She entered the House on Day 1. On Day 17, it was announced that Janine had won the series.

=== Joey Heindle ===
Joey Heindle (born May 14, 1993), is a German singer, which his began his career after placing fifth on the ninth season of Deutschland sucht den Superstar. In 2013, he appeared on the seventh season of Ich bin ein Star – Holt mich hier raus!, which he won the season. In 2018, Heindle appeared on second season of Global Gladiators. He secured the 3rd place. He entered the House on Day 1. He left the house on Day 17 after coming runner-up.

=== Jürgen Trovato ===
Jürgen Trovato (born June 21, 1962), is Germany's most famous TV detective. From 2011 until 2017, he and his wife Marta and daughter Sharon, they were detectives on the television show Die Trovatos – Detektive decken auf. He entered the House on Day 1. He became the third housemate to be evicted on Day 12.

=== Lilo von Kiesenwetter ===
Lilo von Kiesenwetter (born March 25, 1954), is a German Clairvoyance. Many celebrities, such as Udo Walz, Jean Pütz or Jil Sander, rely on Lilo's skills as a clairvoyance. She has been practicing this profession for over 40 years. She entered the House on Day 1. She became the seventh housemate to be evicted on Day 15.

=== Sylvia Leifheit ===
Sylvia Leifheit (born December 3, 1975), is an actress, model, entrepreneur and author. After a longer modeling career, Sylvia conquered the TV screens after an acting agent had become aware of her at an event in Berlin. She attended the casting for the television season Sterne des Südens and was included in the regular team in 1995. She entered the House on Day 3. She became the sixth housemate to be evicted on Day 14.

=== Tobias Wegener ===
Tobias "Tobi" Wegener (born March 13, 1993), is a German reality television personality. He began his career after placing second on the 2018 season of Love Island. He entered the House on Day 1. He left the house on Day 17 in third place.

=== Theresia Fischer ===
Theresia Fischer (born March 31, 1992), is a model. She began her career after placing 11th on the fourteenth season of Germany's Next Topmodel. Fischer lives with her 27-year-old husband Thomas in Hamburg. The pair took on the "yes" word in a very special way: The model and the documentary filmmaker got married in front of cameras during the Germany's Next Topmodel finals in Düsseldorf. She entered the House on Day 1. She left the house on Day 17 in fourth place.

=== Zlatko Trpkovski ===
Zlatko Trpkovski (born January 1, 1976), was a housemate on the first season of Big Brother Germany, he was evicted on Day 41 and he reserved the 10th place. He entered the Promi Big Brother House on Day 3. He became the second housemate to be evicted on Day 11.

== Distribution of housemates ==
Areas and Housemates
Day	Date	The Luxurious Camp Housemates	The Tent Camp Housemates	Reason
1 & 2	7 August and 8 August 2019	Christos, Eva, Ginger, Janine, Joey, Jürgen, Lilo, Tobias and Theresia already moved into "The Tent Camp" on 7 August 2019.		—N/a
1 & 2	7 August and 8 August 2019	—N/a	Christos; Eva; Ginger; Janine; Joey; Jürgen; Lilo; Tobias; Theresia	—N/a
3	9 August 2019	Almklausi and Sylvia moved into "The Tent Camp" on 9 August 2019.		—N/a
3	9 August 2019	Zlatko, Joey and Jürgen moved into "The Luxurious Camp" on 9 August 2019.		Public Vote
3	9 August 2019	Zlatko; Joey▲ Jürgen▲	Christos; Eva; Ginger; Janine; Lilo; Tobias; Theresia; Almklausi; Sylvia	—N/a
4	10 August 2019	Lilo moved from "The Tent Camp" to "The Luxurious Camp".		Decided by housemates in "The Luxurious Camp"
4	10 August 2019	Jürgen moved from "The Luxurious Camp" to "The Tent Camp".		Public Vote
4	10 August 2019	Zlatko; Joey; Lilo▲	Christos; Eva; Ginger; Janine; Tobias; Theresia; Almklausi; Sylvia; Jürgen▼	—N/a
5	11 August 2019	Janine and Tobias moved from "The Tent Camp" to "The Luxurious Camp".		Decided by housemates in "The Luxurious Camp"
5	11 August 2019	Zlatko moved from "The Luxurious Camp" to "The Tent Camp".		Public Vote
5	11 August 2019	Joey; Lilo; Janine▲ Tobias▲	Christos; Eva; Ginger; Theresia; Almklausi; Sylvia; Jürgen; Zlatko▼	—N/a
6	12 August 2019	Theresia moved from "The Tent Camp" to "The Luxurious Camp".		Decided by housemates in "The Luxurious Camp"
6	12 August 2019	Lilo moved from "The Luxurious Camp" to "The Tent Camp".		Public Vote
6	12 August 2019	Joey; Janine; Tobias; Theresia▲	Christos; Eva; Ginger; Almklausi; Sylvia; Jürgen; Zlatko; Lilo▼	—N/a
7	13 August 2019	Tobias moved from "The Luxurious Camp" to "The Tent Camp".		Decided by housemates in "The Tent Camp"
7	13 August 2019	Tobias moved from "The Tent Camp" to "The Luxurious Camp".		Public Vote
7	13 August 2019	Joey; Janine; Theresia; Tobias▼▲	Christos; Eva; Ginger; Almklausi; Sylvia; Jürgen; Zlatko; Lilo	—N/a
8	14 August 2019	Janine, Joey, Theresia and Tobias moved from "The Luxurious Camp" to "The Tent Camp" at the end of the sixth episode.		Duell-Arena
8	14 August 2019	Janine, Joey and Tobias moved from "The Tent Camp" to "The Luxurious camp" at the end of the sixth episode.		Public Vote
8	14 August 2019	Joey▼▲ Janine▼▲ Tobi▼▲	Ginger; Eva; Chris; Almkausi; Sylvia; Jürgen; Zlatko; Lilo; Theresia▼	—N/a
9	15 August 2019	At the end of the seventh episode, Eva, Ginger and Sylvia moved from "The Tent Camp" to "The Luxurious Camp".		Decision by Chris
9	15 August 2019	At the end of the seventh episode, Eva moved from "The Luxurious Camp" to "The Tent Camp".		Public Vote
9	15 August 2019	Joey; Janine; Tobi; Sylvia▲ Ginger▲	Chris; Almkausi; Jürgen; Zlatko; Lilo; Theresia; Eva▲▼	—N/a
10	16 August 2019	At the end of the eight episode, Almklausi, Eva, Lilo and Zlatko moved from "The Tent Camp" to "The Luxurious Camp".		Duell-Arena
10	16 August 2019	At the end of the eight episode, Ginger, Janine, Joey and Tobi moved from "The Luxurious Camp" to "The Tent Camp".		Duell-Arena
10	16 August 2019	Sylvia; Lilo▲ Almkausi▲ ~~Eva~~▲ Zlatko▲	Chris; Jürgen; Theresia; Tobi▼ Ginger▼ Joey▼ Janine▼	Eva got the fewest votes and was evicted from the house.
11	17 August 2019	Sylvia; Lilo; Almkausi; ~~Zlatko~~	Chris; Jürgen; Theresia; Tobi; Ginger; Joey; Janine	Zlatko got the fewest votes and was evicted from the house.
12	18 August 2019	Sylvia; Lilo; Almkausi	Chris; ~~Jürgen~~; Theresia; Tobi; Ginger; Joey; Janine	Jürgen got the fewest votes and was evicted from the house.
13	19 August 2019	Chris, Theresia, Tobi, Ginger, Joey and Janine moved from "The Tent Camp" to "The Luxurious Camp" during the show.		Duell-Arena
13	19 August 2019	Sylvia, Lilo and Almklausi moved from The Luxurious Camp" to "The Tent Camp" during the show.		Duell-Arena
13	19 August 2019	~~Chris~~▲ Theresia▲ Tobi▲ ~~Ginger~~▲ Joey▲ Janine▲	Sylvia▼ Lilo▼ (~~Almklausi~~)▼	Almklausi temporarily left the show for health reasons.
13	19 August 2019	~~Chris~~▲ Theresia▲ Tobi▲ ~~Ginger~~▲ Joey▲ Janine▲	Sylvia▼ Lilo▼ (~~Almklausi~~)▼	Ginger and Chris got the fewest votes and wereevicted from the house.
14	20 August 2019	Theresia moved from The Luxurious Camp" to "The Tent Camp" during the show.		Duell-Arena
14	20 August 2019	Tobi; Joey; Janine	~~Sylvia~~; Lilo; Almkausi; Theresia▼	Sylvia got the fewest votes and was evicted from the house.
15	21 August 2019	Tobi, Joey and Janine moved from "The Luxurious Camp" to "The Tent Camp" at the end of the thirteenth episode.		Producer's decision
15	21 August 2019		~~Lilo~~; Almkausi; Theresia; Tobi▼ Joey▼ Janine▼	Lilo got the fewest votes and was evicted from the house.
16	22 August 2019	Joey, Tobi, Janine and Theresia moved from "The Tent Camp" to "The Luxurious Camp" at the end of the fourteenth episode.		Producer's decision
16	22 August 2019	Theresia▲ Tobi▲ Joey▲ Janine▲	~~Almklausi~~	Almklausi got the fewest votes and was evicted from the house.
17	23 August 2019	~~Theresia~~; ~~Tobi~~; ~~Joey~~; Janine		Theresia had to leave the campsite first during the finale. Tobi left next. Joey got fewer votes than Janine, who was the last housemate to stay at the campsite and win the seventh season.

== Match Arena ==
This year duels have been renamed "matches" in which only poor housemates will participate. One or more housemates will participate in each duel in order to earn more money for their shopping budget. The housemates automatically receive €1 per person per day. Each task completed within the match will earn the housemates €1 extra. Upon successful completion of a match housemates are offered the chance to double their winnings, however failure to complete the doubling challenge will result in the loss of all winnings earning the housemates only the base amount.

The housemates won the match
The housemates lost the match

	Air date	Name of match	Celebrity participation	Maximum profit	Played profit	Notes
1	9 August	"Höhenrausch"	Christos; Eva; Ginger; Janine; Joey; Jürgen; Theresia; Tobias	€8	€2	1
2	10 August	"Kiss ball"	Almklausi; Christos; Eva; Ginger; Janine; Sylvia; Theresia; Tobias	€9 or €18	€5	2, 3
3	11 August	"Shower of the senses"	Janine; Tobias	€9	€0	—N/a
4	12 August	"Trembling Throw"	Jürgen; Sylvia; Theresia; Zlatko	€12	€1	4, 5
5	13 August	"Wohnwagen-Tetris"	Eva; Ginger; Lilo; Sylvia	€8	€0	—N/a
6	14 August	"Wassermelonentaxi"	Janine; Joey; Theresia; Tobi	€8	€0	6
7	15 August	"Drink and Drive"	Christos	€10	€8	—N/a
8	16 August	"Hängende Plattform"	Christos; Eva; Theresia; Zlatko	€7	€0	7

=== Notes ===
- ^Note 1: For health reasons, Lilo was not allowed to compete.
- ^Note 2: In this match the housemates played in pairs. The Pairs were: Almklausi and Sylvia, Christos and Ginger, Eva and Theresia, Janine and Tobias. Lilo didn't have a partner and so she didn't play.
- ^Note 3: The housemates doubled their profits for €5. The pair that played was Janine and Tobias.
- ^Note 4: Jürgen left the match and didn't play.
- ^Note 5: The housemates didn't double their profits for €1.
- ^Note 6: The housemates of the luxury camp played for the housemates of the tent camp for an extra budget of €8 . Since they lost, the luxury camp housemates also had to live in the tent camp.
- ^Note 7: If three contestants had successfully completed the game, the campsite tent camp would have also got video messages from their family and friends.

== Duel Arena ==
From Day 9, the live duels took place again. Big Brother each appoint one or two housemates from the "area" who must compete at the Duel Arena. In the Duel Arena, they both played a game and the loser must face the consequences for his living area.

Duels
#	Air date	The Luxurious Camp Housemates	The Tent Camp Housemates	Game	Winner	Consequence
1	16 August	Sylvia	Zlatko	Bonanza Duell	—N/a	
2	17 August	Zlatko	Tobi	"Lubrication Hills Tournament"	Zlatko	Three residents of The Luxurious Camp receive immunities.
3	18 August	Lilo; Almklausi; Sylvia	Joey; Jürgen; Ginger	"Coffee to Go"	Lilo; Almklausi; Sylvia	For nomination on the same day, A housemate on The Luxurious Camp receives immunity and a housemate on The Tent Camp is instantly nominated.
4	19 August	Almklausi; Sylvia	Joey; Ginger	"Mud fight"	Joey; Ginger	All housemates will change their area.
5	20 August	Theresia; Tobi; Joey; Janine	Sylvia; Lilo; Almklausi	"Throw dwarfs"	Joey; Janine; Tobi	Lilo, Sylvia and Almklausi will remain in their area, Theresia moves to The Tent Camp. Joey, Janine and Tobi stay at The Luxurious Camp.
6	21 August	Janine; Tobi; Joey	Theresia; Lilo; Almklausi	"Sink anglers"	Janine; Tobi; Joey	For nomination on the same day, the winners will receive immunity.
7	22 August		Almklausi; Theresia; Tobi; Joey; Janine	"Gold Rush"	Almklausi; Joey	For nomination on the same day, the winner receives nomination protection. All housemates go to The Tent Camp. Janine, Tobi, and Joey win immunity.

== Nominations table ==
	Day 10	Day 11	Day 12	Day 13		Day 14	Day 15	Day 16	Day 17 Final		Nominations received
	Day 10	Day 11	Day 12	#1	#2	Day 14	Day 15	Day 16	Day 17 Final		Nominations received
Janine	Eva	Zlatko	Theresia	Theresia	Christos, Theresia	Sylvia	Almklausi	Theresia, Almklausi	Winner (Day 17)		11
Joey	Zlatko	Zlatko	Christos	Theresia	Christos, Lilo	Lilo	Lilo	Almklausi, Theresia	Runner-up (Day 17)		10
Tobias	Eva	Zlatko	Theresia	Theresia	Christos, Theresia	Sylvia	Almklausi	Almklausi, Theresia	Third place (Day 17)		1
Theresia	Janine	Jürgen	Jürgen	Janine	Joey, Janine	Joey	Lilo	Janine, Almklausi	Fourth place (Day 17)		12
Almklausi	Joey	Jürgen	Jürgen	Hospitalized		Joey	Lilo	Janine, Tobias	Evicted (Day 16)		7
Lilo	Joey	Jürgen	Jürgen	Ginger	Joey, Janine	Joey	Theresia	Evicted (Day 15)			8
Sylvia	Eva	Jürgen	Jürgen	Ginger	Christos, Janine	Joey	Evicted (Day 14)				2
Christos	Janine	Zlatko	Joey	Janine	Joey, Janine	Evicted (Day 13)					5
Ginger	Lilo	Zlatko	Almklausi	Lilo	Evicted (Day 13)						2
Jürgen	Lilo	Zlatko	Theresia	Evicted (Day 12)							10
Zlatko	Janine	Jürgen	Evicted (Day 11)								7
Eva	Jürgen	Evicted (Day 10)									3
Notes	none	1	2, 3	4, 5		none	6	7	none		
Against public vote	Eva, Janine	Jürgen, Zlatko	Jürgen, Tobias	Ginger, Janine, Theresia	Christos, Janine	Joey, Sylvia	Almklausi, Lilo	Almklausi, Theresia	Janine, Joey, Theresia, Tobias		
Evicted	Eva; 26.39% to save	Zlatko; 39.36% to save	Jürgen; 26.80% to save	Ginger; 16.20% to save	Christos; 49.73% to save	Sylvia; 24.30% to save	Lilo; 16.06% to save	Almklausi; 41.35% to save	Theresia; Fewest votes (out of 4)	Tobias; Fewest votes (out of 3)	
Evicted	Eva; 26.39% to save	Zlatko; 39.36% to save	Jürgen; 26.80% to save	Ginger; 16.20% to save	Christos; 49.73% to save	Sylvia; 24.30% to save	Lilo; 16.06% to save	Almklausi; 41.35% to save	Joey; 46.82% (out of 2)	Janine; 53.18% to win	

=== Notes ===
- ^Note 1: Tobias and Zlatko were able to select for their duel win each three housemates of their area, which received nomination protection. Tobias chose to safe Janine, Joey and himself and Zlatko decided to safe Almklausi, Lilo and Sylvia.
- ^Note 2: Almklausi, Lilo and Sylvia were able to protect one of themselves for the nomination by winning the match. They chose Lilo.
- ^Note 3: The tent camp had to put a housemate on the nomination list as a result of the lost match. They chose Tobias.
- ^Note 4: Since more women than men were in the house, the male housemates were not allowed to be nominated.
- ^Note 5: Because of an accident in Day 13's live duel, Almklausi was taken to hospital and therefore was exempt from both rounds of nominations and could not be nominated in the 2nd round. He returned to the house on Day 14.
- ^Note 6: For the won duel, the complete luxury camp (Janine, Joey and Tobias) received nomination protection.
- ^Note 7: For the won duel, Joey received nomination protection.

== Ratings ==
Episode	Date	Viewers (in millions)			Share (in %)		
Episode	Date	Total	14 - 49 Years	14 - 59 Years	Total	14 - 49 Years	14 - 59 Years
1	9 August 2019	2.29	1.11	1.64	10.9%	18.2%	15.4%
2	10 August 2019	1.68	0.91	1.25	9.0%	15.9%	12.9%
3	11 August 2019	1.73	0.76	1.18	10.1%	14.0%	12.5%
4	12 August 2019	1.70	0.77	1.21	9.6%	14.5%	12.8%
5	13 August 2019	1.75	0.78	1.23	10.7%	15.4%	14.1%
6	14 August 2019	1.75	0.78	1.20	10.6%	15.4%	13.4%
7	15 August 2019	1.95	0.95	1.42	11.4%	18.3%	15.8%
8	16 August 2019	2.19	1.07	1.56	9.5%	15.7%	13.5%
9	17 August 2019	2.20	1.18	1.57	11.5%	19.3%	15.4%
10	18 August 2019	2.05	0.99	1.44	11.2%	16.0%	14.1%
11	19 August 2019	2.15	0.94	1.46	9.3%	14.8%	12.5%
12	20 August 2019	1.98	0.97	1.47	12.0%	17.6%	16.2%
13	21 August 2019	2.10	0.96	1.44	12.4%	17.3%	15.6 %
14	22 August 2019	1.95	0.81	1.35	11.7 %	15.3 %	15.0 %
15	23 August 2019	2.37	1.09	1.66	11.2 %	18.5 %	15.9 %
