= Promi Big Brother season 6 =

Promi Big Brother
- Season 6
- Presented by: Jochen Schropp; Marlene Lufen
- No. of days: 17
- No. of contestants: 13
- Winner: Silvia Wollny
- Runner-up: Chethrin Schulze
- Companion shows: Promi Big Brother – Die Late Night Show; Promi Big Brother – Warm Up; Promi Big Brother – Der Tag danach
- No. of episodes: 15

Release
- Original network: Sat.1
- Original release: 17 August – 31 August 2018

Season chronology
- ← Previous; Season 5 Next → Season 7

Promi Big Brother 2018, also known as Promi Big Brother 6, was the sixth season of the German reality television series Promi Big Brother. The show began airing on 17 August 2018 on Sat.1 and ended after 17 days on 31 August 2018. It was the sixth series of the Big Brother franchise in total to air on Sat.1 to date. Jochen Schropp returned as host of the show and with new host Marlene Lufen.

Silvia Wollny was announced as the winner of the season, with Chethrin Schulze as the runner-up.

== Format ==
Promis had participated in tasks and matches for treats or to avoid punishments. Daily nominations also took place. Furthermore, the house consists of two areas, the luxurious - "Villa" and the poor - "Construction Site". Housemates in "Villa" will choose from the "Construction Site" housemates to join them, whilst the public will vote one of them move to the "Construction Site".

== House ==
This year's Promi Big Brother contains two areas: the luxurious area - the Villa and the poor area - the Construction Site. The Villa having a living area, bathroom, bedroom and diary room as usual. The Construction Site is meager with no bathroom and no beds. There is only a camping toilet, fireplace, cold water tap and a construction trailer.

== Housemates ==
Celebrity	Age on entry	Notability	Day entered	Day exited	Status
Silvia Wollny	53	Star of the reality docu-soap Die Wollnys	3; 9	8; 17	Winner
Chethrin Schulze	26	Participant on the first German version of Love Island	1	17	Runner-up
Alphonso Williams	56	Deutschland sucht den Superstar season 14 winner	1	17	3rd Place
Daniel Völz	33	Bachelor of the 8th season of Der Bachelor	3	17	4th Place
Johannes Haller	30	Die Bachelorette Runner-up	1	16	Evicted
Katja Krasavice	22	YouTube personality	1	15	Evicted
Cora Schumacher	41	Ex-wife of Ralf Schumacher	3	14	Evicted
Umut Kekilli	34	Football player, Ex-partner of Natascha Ochsenknecht	4	13	Evicted
Nicole Belstler-Boettcher	55	Soap actress	1	12	Evicted
Mike Shiva	54	Fortuneteller	1	11	Evicted
Pascal Behrenbruch	33	Former decathlete, European Champion 2012	1	10	Evicted
Sophia Vegas	30	Reality TV personality, I'm a celebrity - Get me out of here! season 10 Runner-up	1; 9	8; 9	Walked
Karl-Heinz Richard von Sayn-Wittgenstein	64	Businessman, Reality TV personality	1	2	Walked

== Distribution of housemates ==
As in the last four seasons, the participants were distributed before the broadcast of the show by the producers in the respective areas. From the first show, the participants and the audience could change the distribution of the housemates in each case by voting and use the Duel Arena. Nine housemates entered The Construction Site area two days before the show was broadcast. The remaining three housemates moved in during the first episode.

Areas and Housemates
Date	The Villa Housemates	The Construction Site Housemates	Reason
15 August and 16 August 2018	Sophia, Alphonso, Johannes, Nicole, Karl-Heinz, Chethrin, Pascal, Katja and Mike already moved into "The Construction Site" on 15 August 2018.		/
15 August and 16 August 2018	/	Sophia; Alphonso; Johannes; Nicole; ~~Karl-Heinz~~; Chethrin; Pascal; Katja; Mike	Karl-Heinz decided to leave the house voluntarily during the night of 16 to 17 August.
17 August 2018	Silvia, Daniel and Cora moved into "The Villa" on 17 August 2018.		/
17 August 2018	Silvia; Daniel; Cora	Sophia; Alphonso; Johannes; Nicole; Chethrin; Pascal; Katja; Mike	/
18 August 2018	Umut moved into "The Construction Site".		Replacement for Karl-Heinz
18 August 2018	Mike moved from "The Construction Site" to "The Villa".		Decided by housemates in "The Villa"
18 August 2018	Daniel moved from "The Villa" to "The Construction Site" .		Duell Arena
18 August 2018	Johannes moved from "The Construction Site" to "The Villa" .		Duell Arena
18 August 2018	Cora moved from "The Villa" to "The Construction Site" .		Public Vote
18 August 2018	Silvia; Mike▲ Johannes▲	Sophia; Alphonso; Johannes; Nicole; Chethrin; Pascal; Katja; Umut; Daniel▼ Cora▼	/
19 August 2018	Johannes moved from "The Villa" to "The Construction Site".		Duell Arena
19 August 2018	Alphonso moved from "The Construction Site" to "The Villa".		Duell Arena
19 August 2018	Nicole and Chethrin are moved from "The Construction Site" to "The Villa".		Decided by housemates in "The Villa"
19 August 2018	Silvia moved from "The Villa" to "The Construction Site".		Public Vote
19 August 2018	Mike; Alphonso▲ Nicole▲ Chethrin▲	Sophia; Pascal; Katja; Umut; Daniel; Cora; Johannes▼ Silvia▼	/
20 August 2018	Sophia, Pascal, Katja, Umut, Daniel, Cora, Johannes und Silvia are moved from "The Construction Site" to "The Villa".		Duell-Arena
20 August 2018	Mike, Alphonso, Nicole and Chethrin are moved from "The Villa" to "The Construction Site".		Duell-Arena
20 August 2018	Mike moved from "The Construction Site" to "The Villa".		Decided by housemates in "The Villa"
20 August 2018	Silvia moved from "The Villa" to "The Construction Site".		Public Vote
20 August 2018	Mike; Sophia▲ Pascal▲ Katja▲ Umut▲ Daniel▲ Cora▲ Johannes▲	Silvia; Alphonso▼ Nicole▼ Chethrin▼	/
21 August 2018	Chethrin moved from "The Construction Site" to "The Villa".		Decided by housemates in "The Villa"
21 August 2018	Sophia moved from "The Villa" to "The Construction Site".		Public Vote
21 August 2018	Mike; Pascal; Katja; Umut; Daniel; Cora; Johannes; Chethrin▲	Silvia; Alphonso; Nicole; Sophia▼	/
22 August 2018	Umut, Mike, Johannes and Cora are moved from "The Villa" to "The Construction Site".		Duell Arena
22 August 2018	Nicole moved from "The Construction Site" to "The Villa".		Decided by housemates in "The Villa"
22 August 2018	Nicole moved from "The Villa" to "The Construction Site".		Public Vote
22 August 2018	Pascal; Katja; Daniel; Chethrin	(~~Silvia~~); Alphonso; Nicole (~~Sophia~~); Umut▼ Mike▼ Johannes▼ Cora▼	Silvia and Sophia temporarily left the house on August 22 for medical reasons.
23 August 2018	Alphonso moved from "The Construction Site" to "The Villa".		Decided by housemates in "The Villa"
23 August 2018	Alphonso moved from "The Villa" to "The Construction Site".		Public Vote
23 August 2018	Pascal; Katja; Daniel; Chethrin	Silvia; Alphonso; Nicole; Sophia; Umut; Mike; Johannes; Cora	Silvia and Sophia returned to the house on August 23 at noon. However, Sophia finally left the house that night for medical reasons.
24 August 2018	Silvia moved from "The Construction Site" to "The Villa".		House Vote
24 August 2018	Johannes, Nicole and Alphonso are moved from "The Construction Site" to "The Villa".		Duell Arena
24 August 2018	Chethrin and Daniel are moved from "The Construction Site" to "The Villa".		Duell Arena
24 August 2018	~~Pascal~~; Katja; Silvia▲ Johannes▲ Alphonso▲ Nicole▲	Umut; Mike; Cora; Daniel▼ Chethrin▼	Pascal received the fewest votes and was evicted from the house.
25 August 2018	Katja; Silvia; Johannes; Alphonso; Nicole	Umut; ~~Mike~~; Cora; Daniel; Chethrin	Mike received the fewest votes and was evicted from the house.
26 August 2018	Alphonso, Nicole and Johannes are moved from "The Construction Site" to "The Villa".		Duell Arena
26 August 2018	Umut and Cora are moved from "The Construction Site" to "The Villa".		Duell Arena
26 August 2018	Katja; Silvia; Umut▲ Cora▲	Daniel; Chethrin; Johannes▼ Alphonso▼ ~~Nicole~~▼	Nicole received the fewest votes and was evicted from the house.
27 August 2018	Katja; Silvia; ~~Umut~~; Cora	Daniel; Chethrin; Johannes; Alphonso	Umut received the fewest votes and was evicted from the house.
28 August 2018	Katja, Silvia and Cora are moved from "The Villa" to "The Construction Site".		/
28 August 2018	/	Daniel; Chethrin; Johannes; Alphonso; Katja▼ Silvia▼ ~~Cora~~▼	Cora received the fewest votes and was evicted from the house.
29 August 2018	/	Daniel; Chethrin; Johannes; Alphonso; ~~Katja~~; Silvia	Katja received the fewest votes and was evicted from the house.
30 August 2018	Daniel, Chethrin, Johannes, Alphonso and Silvia are moved from "The Construction Site" to "The Villa".		Duell Arena
30 August 2018	Daniel▲ Chethrin▲ ~~Johannes~~▲ Alphonso▲ Silvia▲	/	Johannes received the fewest votes and was evicted from the house.
31 August 2018	Daniel; Chethrin; Alphonso; Silvia	/	/

== Duel Arena ==
As in the previous year, this year live duels took place in the "Outdoor Duel Arena" again. Big Brother each appoint one or two housemates from the "area" who must compete at the Duel Arena. In the Duel Arena, they both played a game and the loser must face the consequences for his living area. A draw always wins for the inhabitants in "The Villa". The duels each can either have a positive impact on the winner's section or consequences for the loser's section. For example, the losing team changing their areas, receives less food or have to give personal items.

Duels
Date	The Villa Housemates	The Construction Site Housemates	Game	Winner	Consequence
17 August 2018	Cora	Katja	"Dizziness Quiz"	Cora	Housemates will remain in their area.
18 August 2018	Daniel	Johannes	"Wobble Courage"	Johannes	Housemates will change their area.
19 August 2018	Johannes	Alphonso	"Fireball"	Alphonso	Housemates will change their area.
20 August 2018	Nicole; Chethrin	Cora; Katja	"Always stay on the carpet"	Cora; Katja	All housemates will change their area.
21 August 2018	Pascal; Umut	Chethrin; Alphonso	"Drive me"	Pascal; Umut	Housemates will remain in their area.
22 August 2018	Team Pascal: Pascal; Daniel; Chethrin; Katja; Team Umut: Umut; Mike; Johannes; Cora	/	"Water cannon"	Team Pascal: Pascal; Daniel; Chethrin; Katja	Umut, Mike, Johannes and Cora are moved to "The Construction Site".
23 August 2018	Pascal; Daniel; Chethrin; Katja	Umut; Johannes; Nicole; Cora	"Falling Down"	Pascal; Daniel; Chethrin; Katja	Housemates will remain in their area.
24 August 2018	Blue: Pascal	White: Umut	"Hammer Hart"	Pascal	Housemates will remain in their area.
24 August 2018	Team White: Katja; Johannes	Team Blue: Mike; Cora	"Thick lip"	Katja; Johannes	Johannes will live in "The Villa", other housemates will remain in their area.
24 August 2018	Team Blue: Chethrin; Daniel	Team White: Nicole; Alphonso	"Dandelion"	Nicole; Alphonso	Housemates will change their area.
25 August 2018	Johannes	Umut	"Bootcamp"	Johannes	Housemates will remain in their area.
26 August 2018	Alphonso	Daniel	"Celeb-Gamble"	2 of 4 rounds: Alphonso; 2 of 4 rounds: Daniel	Chethrin, Daniel, Silvia and Katja will remain in their area, other housemates will change their area.
27 August 2018	Umut; Katja	Daniel; Johannes	"Imposter"	Daniel; Johannes	Housemates on "The Construction Site" will be immune for this round of nomination.
28 August 2018	/	Alphonso; Silvia	"Slide game"	Alphonso	Alphonso's nomination counted double.
29. August 2018	/	Daniel; Chethrin	„Hoch' damit“	Daniel	Daniel received immunity from nomination and Chethrin is automatically nominated.
30 August 2018	/	Daniel; Johannes; Alphonso; Silvia; Chethrin	"Dinner for fun"	Daniel; Johannes; Alphonso; Silvia; Chethrin	All housemates will live in "The Villa".
31 August 2018	Daniel; Chethrin	/	"Himmelsstürmer"	Daniel	/
31 August 2018	Alphonso; Silvia	/	"Steadfast"	Silvia	/

== Nominations table ==
	Day 10	Day 11	Day 12	Day 13	Day 14	Day 15	Day 16	Day 17 Final		Nominations received
Silvia	No; Nominations	Mike	Chethrin, Nicole	Katja	Chethrin	Katja	Johannes	Winner (Day 17)		7
Chethrin	No; Nominations	Mike	Cora, Johannes	Cora	Cora	Silvia	Silvia	Runner-Up (Day 17)		12
Alphonso	No; Nominations	Chethrin	Chethrin, Umut	Umut	Chethrin (x2)	Katja	Silvia	Third Place (Day 17)		3
Daniel	No; Nominations	Mike	Alphonso, Silvia	Cora	Silvia	Katja	Silvia	Fourth Place (Day 17)		0
Johannes	No; Nominations	Mike	Umut, Chethrin	Umut	Chethrin	Silvia	Chethrin	Evicted (Day 16)		3
Katja	No; Nominations	Mike	Nicole, Alphonso	Umut	Cora	Johannes	Evicted (Day 15)			6
Cora	No; Nominations	Chethrin	Chethrin, Nicole	Katja	Chethrin	Evicted (Day 14)				6
Umut	No; Nominations	Nicole	Alphonso, Nicole	Katja	Evicted (Day 13)					6
Nicole	No; Nominations	Mike	Cora, Umut	Evicted (Day 12)						5
Mike	No; Nominations	Cora	Evicted (Day 11)							6
Pascal	No; Nominations	Evicted (Day 10)								0
Sophia	Walked (Day 9)									0
Heinz	Walked (Day 2)									0
Notes	none			1	2, 3	4	5	none		
Against public vote	Alphonso, Cora, Chethrin, Daniel, Silvia, Nicole, Katja, Umut; Pascal, Mike, Johannes	Chethrin, Mike	Chethrin, Nicole	Katja, Umut	Chethrin, Cora	Chethrin, Katja	Chethrin, Johannes, Silvia	Alphonso, Chethrin, Daniel, Silvia		
Walked	Heinz, Sophia	none								
Evicted	Pascal; Fewest votes to save	Mike; Fewest votes to save	Nicole; Fewest votes to save	Umut; Fewest votes to save	Cora; Fewest votes to save	Katja; Fewest votes to save	Johannes; Fewest votes to save	Daniel; Fewest votes (out of 4)	Alphonso; Fewest votes (out of 3)	
Evicted	Pascal; Fewest votes to save	Mike; Fewest votes to save	Nicole; Fewest votes to save	Umut; Fewest votes to save	Cora; Fewest votes to save	Katja; Fewest votes to save	Johannes; Fewest votes to save	Chethrin; 42.9% (out of 2)	Silvia; 57.1% to win	

=== Notes ===
- ^Note 1: Housemates in "The Construction Site" were rewarded immunities for winning the duel by Daniel and Johannes.
- ^Note 2: Male housemates were immune, and only female housemates could be nominated.
- ^Note 3: Alphonso won the duel, he's nomination counted double.
- ^Note 4: Daniel was immune that nomination after winning the Duel while Chethrin was automatically nominated after losing it. Both had the opportunity to give both options to another housemate but they decided to keep it for themselves.
- ^Note 5: Daniel was immune after receiving the final ticket.

== Ratings ==
Ratings
Episode	Viewers (in millions)			Share (in %)		
Episode	Total	14 - 49 Years	14 - 59 Years	Total	14 - 49 Years	14 - 59 Years
1	2.37	1.20	1.72	10.6%	17.9%	15.0%
2	1.73	0.89	1.22	9.2%	14.5%	12.1%
3	1.95	1.00	1.41	11.4%	17.1%	14.7%
4	1.90	0.93	1.37	10.1%	15.4%	13.2%
5	1.88	0.90	1.30	11.5%	16.6%	14.3%
6	2.17	1.12	1.60	13.0%	20.7 %	17.5 %
7	2.16	1.08	1.54	13.0%	19.9%	16.6%
8	1.66	0.83	1.14	7.3%	12.8%	9.9%
9	1.73	0.93	1.23	9.1%	15.2%	11.9%
10	2.05	1.09	1.50	11.6%	17.7%	14.7%
11	2.02	0.91	1.38	11.8%	16.5%	14.6%
12	1.86	0.93	1.31	10.4%	15.5%	13.2%
13	2.27	1.11	1.59	13.4 %	19.6%	17.0%
14	1.96	0.96	1.35	11.7%	17.2%	14.6%
15	2.28	1.15	1.57	10.0%	16.4%	13.6%
