= Promi Big Brother season 10 =

Season of Promi Big Brother

Promi Big Brother
- Season 10
- Presented by: Jochen Schropp; Marlene Lufen
- No. of days: 22
- No. of housemates: 16
- Winner: Rainer Gottwald
- Runner-up: Micaela Schäfer
- Companion show: Die Late Night Show
- No. of episodes: 20

Release
- Original network: Sat.1
- Original release: 18 November – 7 December 2022

Additional information
- Filming dates: 16 November – 7 December 2022

Season chronology
- ← Previous; Season 9 Next → Season 11

Promi Big Brother 2022, also known as Promi Big Brother 10 and as the anniversary season, is the tenth season of the German reality television series Promi Big Brother. The show began airing on 18 November 2022 on Sat.1 and will end after 22 days on 7 December 2022. It is the tenth celebrity season and the eleventh season of the Big Brother franchise to air on Sat.1 to date. Jochen Schropp and Marlene Lufen both returned as hosts of the show.

== Production ==
The tenth season uses a mock garage, an attic and a luxurious loft as sets. The garage and attic areas do not include an outdoor area, but a separate smoking area. Initial speculation that the tenth season could be about football turned out to be deliberate false reports for marketing purposes as part of the 2022 FIFA World Cup in Qatar, which was taking place at the same time.

=== Opening Intro ===
The song of this year's intro and outro is "Es geht um Alles" from Michael Wolfschmidt.

=== Spin-off shows ===
==== Die Late Night Show ====
The live late-night show with the name Die Late Night Show returned and will air every day after the main show on Sat.1. Jochen Bendel and Melissa Khalaj returned as hosts of the late-night show. Special guests joined the presenter duo to analyze the situation of the show and it also features exclusive live broadcasts from the house.

===== Special guests =====
Episode	Air date	Special guests
1	19 November 2022	Gigi Birofio, Jenny Elvers, Marc Terenzi
2	20 November 2022	Eva Benetatou, Thorsten Legat
3	21 November 2022	Claudia Obert, Julian F. M. Stoeckel
4	22 November 2022	Calvin Kleinen, Can Kaplan, LaFee
5	23 November 2022	Diana Herold, Nadine Nana Miree, Paul Janke
6	24 November 2022	Almklausi, Jeremy Fragrance, Alessia-Milane Herren, Christel Schäfer
7	25 November 2022	Marco Heyne, Melody Haase, Tobias Wegener
8	26 November 2022	Diana Schell, Cora Schumacher, Lorenz Büffel
9	27 November 2022	Janine Pink, Luca Antonio Cinqueoncie, Aaron Königs
10	28 November 2022	Chethrin Schulze, Jörg Dahlmann, Gino Leone, Yasin Mohamed, Can Kaplan
11	29 November 2022	Paulina Ljubas, Meike Emonts, Rafi Rachek
12	30 November 2022	Catrin Heyne, Walentina Doronina, Can Kaplan, Xenia Prinzessin von Sachsen, Jens Hilbert
13	1 December 2022	Pascal Kappés, Lily Aikans, Nico Müller
14	2 December 2022	Jeremy Fragrance, Jörg Knör, Sarina Simone Kolibal
15	3 December 2022	Tanja Tischewitsch, Justus Toussis, Luca Bazzanella, Mademoiselle Nicolette, Maurice Schmitz
16	4 December 2022	Yvonne Woelke, Knossi, Walentina Doronina, Can Kaplan
17	5 December 2022	Jochen Schropp, Marlene Lufen, Doreen Steinert, Tanja Tischewitsch
18	6 December 2022	Julian F. M. Stoeckel, Jessie Noe Scheuermann, Jennifer Iglesias, Lily Aikans
19	7 December 2022	Katy Karrenbauer, Sascha Sirtl, Kader Loth, Jay Khan
20	8 December 2022	Menderes Bağcı, Sam Dylan, Micaela Schäfer, Rainer Gottwald

== Housemates ==
Celebrity	Age on entry	Notability	Day entered	Day exited	Status
Rainer Gottwald	56	Boxing promoter	1	22	Winner
Micaela Schäfer	39	Nude model, TV Presenter	1	22	Runner-up
Sam Dylan	31	TV Personality	1	22	3rd Place
Menderes Bağcı	39	Musician, reality star	1	22	4th Place
Jay Khan	41	Singer, former member of the band US5 and founder of the band Team 5ünf	1	21	Evicted
Katy Karrenbauer	59	Actress	3	21	Evicted
Jennifer Iglesias	24	TV Personality	1	20	Evicted
Doreen Steinert	36	Singer, former member of the band Nu Pagadi	3	19	Evicted
Tanja Tischewitsch	33	TV Personality, Actress	1	17	Evicted
Jörg Knör	63	Comedian and parodist	3	16	Evicted
Walentina Doronina	22	Influencer, TV Personality	1	14	Evicted
Catrin Heyne	38	TV Personality	9	14	Evicted
Jörg Dahlmann	63	Football commentator	3	12	Evicted
Diana Schell	52	Presenter	1	10	Evicted
Jeremy Fragrance	33	Influencer, former member of the band Part Six (as Jeremy Williams) and Golden Circle	1	8	Walked
Patrick Hufen	52	Insurance detective	3	4	Walked

== Loft, Garage and Attic ==
	Week 1						Week 2							Week 3		
	Day 1–3	Day 4	Day 5	Day 6	Day 7	Day 8	Day 9	Day 10	Day 11	Day 12	Day 13	Day 14	Day 15	Day 16–18	Day 19–21	Day 22
Rainer	Garage	Loft				Attic			Garage				Loft	Garage		Loft
Micaela	Garage						Loft					Garage	Loft		Garage	Loft
Sam	Attic				Garage			Attic	Garage	Loft	Garage		Loft	Garage		Loft
Menderes	Garage				Loft	Attic			Garage				Loft	Garage		Loft
Jay	Attic	Garage										Loft			Garage	
Katy		Attic	Garage						Loft						Garage	
Jennifer	Attic				Garage		Loft							Garage		
Doreen		Garage						Loft				Garage	Loft		Garage	
Tanja	Garage			Loft		Attic			Garage				Loft			
Jörg K.		Attic		Garage									Loft	Garage		
Walentina	Attic					Garage	Attic		Garage							
Catrin								Loft		Garage						
Jörg D.		Garage														
Diana	Garage		Loft			Attic										
Jeremy	Attic					Loft										
Patrick		Attic														
Reason	none	A	B	C	D	E	F	G	H	I	J	K	L	M	N	L

=== Reasons ===
- ^Note A : Rainer lost in the Duel Arena and moved in the Loft area. Then the viewers voted for Jay to move in the Garage area.
- ^Note B : Diana lost in the Duel Arena and moved in the Loft area. Then the viewers voted for Katy to move in the Garage area.
- ^Note C : Tanja lost in the Duel Arena and moved in the Loft area. Then the viewers voted for Jörg K. to move in the Garage area.
- ^Note D : Menderes lost in the Duel Arena and moved in the Loft area. Then the viewers voted for Jennifer and Sam to move in the Garage area.
- ^Note E : Big Brother decided to move Diana, Menderes, Rainer and Tanja in the Attic area. Jeremy won in the Duel Arena and moved in the Loft area, while Walentina, who lost in the Duel Arena and moved in the Garage area.
- ^Note F : The viewers voted for Micaela to move in the Loft area. Jennifer won in the Duel Arena and moved in the Loft area and Walentina, who lost in the Duel Arena, moved in the Attic area.
- ^Note G : Doreen won in the Duel Arena and moved in the Loft area and Sam, who lost in the Duel Arena, moved in the Attic area.
- ^Note H : Big Brother decided to move everyone from the Attic area in the Garage area. The viewers voted for Katy to move in the Loft area.
- ^Note I : The housemates in the Loft area decided for Sam to move in the Loft area. The viewers voted for Catrin to move in the Garage area.
- ^Note J : The housemates in the Loft area decided for Walentina to move in the Loft area. The viewers voted for Sam and Walentina to move in the Garage area.
- ^Note K : The housemates in the Loft area decided for Jay to move in the Loft area. The viewers voted for Doreen and Micaela to move in the Garage area.
- ^Note L : Big Brother decided to move everyone from the Garage area in the Loft area.
- ^Note M : Jörg K., Rainer, Menderes, Sam and Jennifer lost in the Duel Arena and moved in the Garage area.
- ^Note N : Big Brother decided to move everyone from the Loft area in the Garage area.

== Duel Arena ==
Housemates from the Loft
Housemates from the Garage
Housemates from the Attic

=== Area Exchange ===
Duel number	Air date	Housemates participated		Winner(s)	Notes
1	18 November 2022	Diana; Doreen; Jörg D. Menderes; Micaela; Rainer; Tanja		Jörg D.	1
2	19 November 2022	Diana	Micaela	Micaela	1
3	20 November 2022	Jörg D. Menderes; Tanja	Doreen; Jay; Micaela	Doreen; Jay; Micaela	1, 2
4	21 November 2022	Jay	Menderes	Jay	1
5	22 November 2022	Jeremy	Walentina	Jeremy	3
6	23 November 2022	Doreen; Jay; Jennifer; Jörg D. Jörg K. Katy; Sam; Walentina		Jennifer	4
7	24 November 2022	Doreen	Sam	Doreen	4
8	25 November 2022	Jay; Tanja; Sam; Jörg D. Jörg K.	Rainer; Menderes; Diana; Walentina; Katy	Rainer; Menderes; Diana; Walentina; Katy	5

- ^1 : The loser had to leave the Garage area and was allowed to move to the Loft area, which the other residents did not know. The others remain in the Garage area.
- ^2 : Jörg D. as team captain had to decide who had to move in the Garage area. He chose Tanja.
- ^3 : Jeremy, as the winner of the duel, was allowed to move to the Loft area. Valentina moved to the Garage area.
- ^4 : The winner had to leave the Garage area and was allowed to move to the Loft area, while the loser had to leave the Garage area and was allowed to move to the Attic area. The others remain in the Garage area.
- ^5 : The viewers could vote one from the winners, to move in the Loft area.

== Supermarket Purchases ==
The Penny market, which is part of a Product placement, once again serves as a supermarket where the housemates of the poor area can shop on a budget. The housemates have the budget of €1 per person per day per shopping. The remainder money does not carry over to the next day. Occasionally, they also have a chance to earn more money from Duels.

Air date	Housemate	Time	Budget	Spent	Remainder
18 November 2022	Menderes	1 minute	€7,00	€6,14	€0,86
19 November 2022	Micaela	1 minute	€7,00	€6,44	€0,56
20 November 2022	Katy	1 minute	€7,00	€5,95	€1,05
21 November 2022	Jay	1 minute	€7,00	€5,66	€1,34
22 November 2022	Sam	1 minute	€8,00	€7,73	€0,27
23 November 2022	Walentina	1 minute	€8,00	€7,98	€0,02
24 November 2022	Jörg K.	1 minute	€4,00	€2,68	€1,32
25 November 2022	Jörg D.	1 minute	€9,00	€7,76	€1,24

== Nominations table ==
	Day 10	Day 11	Day 13	Day 14	Day 15	Day 17	Day 18	Day 19	Day 20	Day 21	Day 22 Final			Nominations received
	Day 10	Day 11	Day 13	Day 14	Day 15	Day 17	Day 18	Day 19	Day 20	Day 21	Round 1	Round 2	Round 3	Nominations received
Rainer	No; Nominations	Jörg D	Not eligible	Jennifer	Not eligible	Not eligible	Doreen; Katy	No; Nominations	Katy	Micaela; Jay	Safe	Safe	Winner (Day 22)	5
Micaela	No; Nominations	Sam	Not eligible	Walentina	Not eligible	Rainer; Sam	Not eligible	No; Nominations	Rainer	Not eligible	Nominated	Nominated	Runner-up (Day 22)	3
Sam	No; Nominations	Micaela	Catrin; Menderes	Jörg K	Not eligible	Not eligible	Jay; Doreen	No; Nominations	Rainer	Not eligible	Safe	Nominated	Third place (Day 22)	7
Menderes	No; Nominations	Walentina	Not eligible	Sam	Not eligible	Not eligible	Doreen; Katy	No; Nominations	Katy	Not eligible	Nominated	Fourth place (Day 22)		1
Jay	No; Nominations	Jörg K	Not eligible	Jörg K	Jörg K Rainer; Sam	Rainer; Sam	Not eligible	No; Nominations	Sam	Not eligible	Evicted (Day 21)			3
Katy	No; Nominations	Sam	Not eligible	Rainer	Not eligible	Rainer; Sam	Not eligible	No; Nominations	Jay	Evicted (Day 21)				5
Jennifer	No; Nominations	Katy	Not eligible	Jörg K	Not eligible	Not eligible	Micaela; Rainer	No; Nominations	Evicted (Day 20)					3
Doreen	No; Nominations	Sam	Not eligible	Walentina	Not eligible	Rainer; Sam	Not eligible	Evicted (Day 19)						4
Tanja	No; Nominations	Jörg K	Jennifer; Catrin	Jörg K	Not eligible	Rainer; Sam	Evicted (Day 17)							2
Jörg K	No; Nominations	Jörg D	Jennifer; Tanja	Tanja	Not eligible	Evicted (Day 16)								9
Walentina	No; Nominations	Jörg D	Catrin; Doreen	Jörg K	Evicted (Day 14)									4
Catrin	No; Nominations	Walentina	Not eligible	Evicted (Day 14)										3
Jörg D	No; Nominations	Jörg K	Evicted (Day 12)											3
Diana	No; Nominations	Evicted (Day 10)												N/A
Jeremy	Walked (Day 8)													N/A
Patrick	Walked (Day 4)													N/A
Notes	1	2	3	none	4	5	6	7	8	9	10	11	none	
Against public vote	All housemates	Doreen; Jennifer; Jörg D Jörg K Sam	Catrin; Jennifer	Jörg K Walentina	Jörg K Rainer; ~~Sam~~	~~Rainer~~; Sam; Tanja	Doreen; Katy	Jennifer; Micaela; ~~Sam~~	Katy; Rainer	Jay; Micaela	Menderes; Micaela	Micaela; Sam	Micaela; Rainer	
Walked	Jeremy, Patrick	none												
Evicted	Diana; Fewest votes to save	Jörg D Fewest votes to save	Catrin; Fewest votes to save	Walentina; Fewest votes to save	Jörg K Fewest votes to save	Tanja; Fewest votes to save	Doreen; Fewest votes to save	Jennifer; Fewest votes to save	Katy; Fewest votes to save	Jay; Fewest votes to save	Menderes; Fewest votes (out of 2)	Sam; Fewest votes (out of 2)	Micaela; Fewest votes (out of 2)	
Evicted	Diana; Fewest votes to save	Jörg D Fewest votes to save	Catrin; Fewest votes to save	Walentina; Fewest votes to save	Jörg K Fewest votes to save	Tanja; Fewest votes to save	Doreen; Fewest votes to save	Jennifer; Fewest votes to save	Katy; Fewest votes to save	Jay; Fewest votes to save	Menderes; Fewest votes (out of 2)	Sam; Fewest votes (out of 2)	Rainer; Most votes (out of 2)	

=== Notes ===
- ^Note 1 : There were no nominations this round. Instead, the viewers voted for their favourite housemate. The housemate with the fewest votes was evicted. Catrin was immune because she only moved in a day earlier.
- ^Note 2 : Housemate could only nominate housemates in their living area. Doreen was automatically nominated after losing the Black Lantern challenge. Jennifer received a killer nomination by Jörg K after the Garage housemates won that evening's challenge. Catrin was immune because she only moved in two days ago. Jennifer received a killer nomination by Jörg K after the Garage housemates won that evening's challenge.
- ^Note 3 : Only the winning team from this evening's challenge was allowed to nominated. Jörg K won a challenge earlier that day for Katy, resulting in both being immune from nomination.
- ^Note 4 : Jay, as captain from the winning team of this evening's challenge had to nominate 3 housemates from the losing team. Later, Sam saved himself from eviction after winning another challenge.
- ^Note 5 : On Day 16, Doreen & Tanja played for a secret envelope. Doreen won, hence she had to decide which one of them should receive immunity or get automatically nominated. Doreen kept the immunity for herself, nominating Tanja for eviction. On Day 17, the winning team of this night's challenge had to save two members of the losing team from eviction, they chose Menderes & Jennifer, leaving Rainer & Sam nominated. Rainer saved himself from eviction later that evening.
- ^Note 6 : Only the winning team of that night's challenge was allowed to nominate.
- ^Note 7 : The losing team of that night's challenge was automatically nominated. Sam saved himself from eviction in another challenge.
- ^Note 8 : Menderes won this night's challenge. His vote counted triple.
- ^Note 9 : Rainer won this night's challenge, therefore he was the only person allowed to nominate.
- ^Note 10 : Rainer and Sam finished first and second in the first Final Challenge, advancing into Round 2.
- ^Note 11 : Rainer won the second Final Challenge, advancing into Round 3.
