= Promi Big Brother season 3 =

Promi Big Brother
- Season 3
- Presented by: Jochen Schropp
- No. of days: 17
- No. of contestants: 12
- Winner: David Odonkor
- Runner-up: Menowin Fröhlich
- Companion shows: Promi Big Brother – Die Late Night Show; Promi Big Brother – Jetzt wird abgerechnet; Aaron live – Die Webshow
- No. of episodes: 15

Release
- Original network: Sat.1
- Original release: 14 August – 28 August 2015

Season chronology
- ← Previous; Season 2 Next → Season 4

The third series of Promi Big Brother started on 14 August 2015 and ended on 28 August 2015. It was the third series of the Big Brother franchise on Sat.1, after it left RTL II. 5 celebrity housemates ("promis") entered the house on Day 1 and the other 7 celebrities entered on Day 3. The show was hosted by Jochen Schropp.

== Format ==
Promis had participated in tasks and matches for treats or to avoid punishments. Daily nominations also took place (from Day 8 to 14). Furthermore, the house consists of two floors, the upper luxury floor and the lower poverty floor. Housemates on the luxury floor will choose of the poor housemates to join them upstairs, whilst the public will vote one of the 7 downstairs.

== House ==
This year's Promi Big Brother contains two floors, each floor having their separate living areas, bathrooms, bedrooms and diary rooms. The upper floor will be luxurious, whilst the lower floor is meager with no beds or real seating.

== Housemates ==
Celebrity	Age on entry	Notability	Day entered	Day exited	Status
David Odonkor	31	Former football player	1	17	Winner
Menowin Fröhlich	27	Singer, contestant on Deutschland sucht den Superstar	1	17	Runner-up
Nino de Angelo	51	Singer	3	17	3rd Place
Sarah Nowak	24	Model, Playboy Playmate	1	17	4th Place
Julia Jasmin 'JJ' Rühle	28	Actress, singer	3	17	5th Place
Désirée Nick	58	Actress, author	3	16	Evicted
Nina Kristin Fiutak	33	Model, Singer and Actress	3	15	Evicted
Anja Schüte	50	Actress	3	13	Evicted
Wilfried Gliem	68	Singer, member of Wildecker Herzbuben	3	13	Walked
Judith Hildebrandt	38	Actress, singer and presenter	1	12	Evicted
Michael Ammer	54	VIP party promoter	3	11	Evicted
Daniel Köllerer	32	Former tennis player	1	10	Evicted
Gina-Lisa Lohfink	28	Model, contestant on Germany's Next Topmodel	-	-	Not chosen

Note:
In the first Live Show the public voted whether Julia Jasmin 'JJ' Rühle or Gina-Lisa Lohfink should move in the House and decided on Julia Jasmin 'JJ' Rühle.

== Duel Arena ==
Big Brother respectively determines a housemate of "upstairs", which must compete on the Duel Arena. This candidate from "upstairs" must choose one of the housemates of "Downstairs" who competed against him. In the Duel Arena both compete in a game and the loser must face the consequences for his residential area. With a draw always win the housemate from the "Upstairs" area.

In the broadcast of 18 August 2015, the rules are changed: One housemate from upstairs and downstairs playing for the entire team. The winning team pulls up and the loser team down. On top you get to eat again plentiful, while the inhabitants of the bottom have to feed with bread and water. Furthermore, the living conditions (such as less sleep capacities) have continued to deteriorate in the lower area. In addition, in this episode, the entire respective team determined jointly, who must compete for each area, "Up" or "Down", to a duel. A draw there would be an estimated question.

Duels
Date	Housemate "Upstairs"	Housemate "Downstairs"	Game	Winner	Consequence
14 August 2015	Michael	Menowin	"Snapped"	Michael	Housemates "downstairs" need to eat in the next 24 hours by bread and tap water
15 August 2015	Nina Kristin	Judith	"Show us your Muscles!" (Expander)	Judith	Housemates "Upstairs" must eat in the next 24 hours only porridge, champagne and tap water.
16 August 2015	Julia-Jasmin	Sarah	"Lickball"	Sarah	Housemates "Upstairs" must eat in the next 24 hours only porridge, champagne and tap water.
17 August 2015	Wilfried	David	"Mental arithmetic"	David	Housemates "Upstairs" must eat in the next 24 hours only porridge, champagne and tap water.
18 August 2015	Daniel	David	"Divin after table tennis balls"	David	Housemates from "upstairs" exchange with the housemates from "downstairs" the areas. Housemates from "downstairs" are allowed to feed on another by bread and tap water. "Upstairs" is available for the housemates, however, again gourmet food.
19 August 2015	Nino	Menowin	"Poker Face"	Menowin	The housemates of "upstairs" must go to bed earlier, while the housemates "downstairs" can celebrate from midnight a party.
20 August 2015	Daniel	Menowin	"Speed Scrabble"	Daniel (draw)	Menowin is not allowed that day to be selected upwards by the upper housemates, because he has lost the duel. The of "Upstairs" selected Julia-Jasmin may not pass her ticket to the top on Menowin.
21 August 2015	Judith	JJ	"Oil catching"	Judith	The housemates from "Downstairs" won't receive any personal messages from home.
22 August 2015	Judith	Désirée	"Big Brother Memory"	Judith (draw)	Reward: Judith can't be nominated by Big Brother and is save from the eviction.
23 August 2015	Anja	Nina Kristin	"Color bomb battle"	Nina Kristin	Reward: The housemates of "Downstairs" exchange the areas with the housemates of "Upstairs".
24 August 2015	Désirée (Deputy: Julia-Jasmin)	David (Deputy: Menowin)	"Fight the pain" (electrocution)	Désirée (Deputy: Julia-JasminJ)	Reward: Desirée is allowed to remain as a winner in the upper part, as her deputy Julia-Jasmin won the duel.
25 August 2015	Sarah	Nino	"Shake the donuts"	Nino	The housemates of "Downstairs" exchange the areas with the housemates of "Upstairs".
26 August 2015	Nino	Nina-Kristin	"Playing Footsie"	Nino	The winning housemate can promote himself why he should stay in the house
26 August 2015	David	Désirée	"Blow"	David	The housemates of "Downstairs" would exchange the areas with the housemates of "Upstairs" in case of a victory
27 August 2015	—N/a	Menowin; Sarah	"Clean the nose"	Menowin	Actual Reward: Menowin and one other housemate of "Downstairs" should change in the luxury range. Menowin as winners of this tie rejects this offer.

- All housemates lived after the merge at downstairs. Therefore, there were two housemates competing from the same area..

== Nominations table ==
Key:

Downstairs Housemates
Upstairs Housemates

	Day 10	Day 11	Day 12	Day 13	Day 14	Day 15	Day 16	Day 17 Final		Nominations received
David	Nina-Kristin, Sarah	No nominations	Nino	Nina-Kristin	Nina-Kristin, Nino	No nominations	Nino	Winner (Day 17)		1
Menowin	Judith, Nino	No nominations	Judith	Nina-Kristin	Nina-Kristin, Julia-Jasmin	No nominations	Désirée	Runner-up (Day 17)		1
Nino	Daniel, Anja	No nominations	Wilfried	Anja	Désirée, Sarah	No nominations	Désirée	Third place (Day 17)		11
Sarah	Désirée, Nina-Kristin	No nominations	Wilfried	Anja	Désirée, Nina-Kristin	No nominations	Désirée	Fourth place (Day 17)		5
Julia-Jasmin	Nina-Kristin, Judith	No nominations	Judith	Nina-Kristin	Nino, David	No nominations	Nino	Fifth place (Day 17)		1
Désirée	Nina-Kristin, Nino	No nominations	Nino	Sarah	Nino, Sarah	No nominations	Nino	Evicted (Day 16)		8
Nina-Kristin	Daniel, Wilfried	No nominations	Wilfried	Désirée	Nino, Désirée	No nominations	Evicted (Day 15)			14
Anja	Daniel, Sarah	No nominations	Wilfried	Nina-Kristin	Evicted (Day 13)					4
Wilfried	Nina-Kristin, Daniel	No nominations	Anja	Walked (Day 13)						6
Judith	Daniel, Sarah	No nominations	Menowin	Evicted (Day 12)						4
Michael	Daniel, Nina-Kristin	No nominations	Evicted (Day 11)							0
Daniel	Nina-Kristin, Wilfried	Evicted (Day 10)								6
Nomination notes	none	1	2	3	4, 5		none	6		
Against public vote	Daniel, Nina-Kristin	Anja, David, Désirée, Julia-Jasmin, Menowin, Michael, Nina-Kristin, Nino, Sarah, Wilfried	Judith, Nino, Wilfried	Anja, Nina-Kristin	Nina-Kristin, Nino		Désirée, Nino	David, Julia-Jasmin, Menowin, Nino, Sarah		
Walked	none			Wilfried	none					
Evicted	Daniel; Fewest votes to save	Michael; Fewest votes to save	Judith; Fewest votes to save	Anja; Fewest votes to save	Eviction cancelled	Nina-Kristin; Fewest votes to save	Désirée; Fewest votes to save	Julia-Jasmin; Fewest votes (out of 5)	Sarah; Fewest votes (out of 4)	
Evicted	Daniel; Fewest votes to save	Michael; Fewest votes to save	Judith; Fewest votes to save	Anja; Fewest votes to save	Eviction cancelled	Nina-Kristin; Fewest votes to save	Désirée; Fewest votes to save	Nino; Fewest votes (out of 3)	Menowin; 39.0% (out of 2)	
Evicted	Daniel; Fewest votes to save	Michael; Fewest votes to save	Judith; Fewest votes to save	Anja; Fewest votes to save	Eviction cancelled	Nina-Kristin; Fewest votes to save	Désirée; Fewest votes to save	David; 61.0% to win		

== Notes ==
- ^Note 1: All Housemates automatically faced the public vote. However, Judith, won immunity during that night's duel.
- ^Note 2: All Downstairs Housemates were immune from being nominated. Upstairs Housemates were forced to give their nominations face-to-face.
- ^Note 3: All male Housemates were immune from being nominated.
- ^Note 4: The Housemate with the most nominations had to choose with whom he or she would face the public vote. This Housemate was Nino and he chose Nina-Kristin.
- ^Note 5: Due to Wilfried's walking from the House on Day 13, the eviction on Day 14 was cancelled. The nominations made on Day 14 rolled over to Day 15.
- ^Note 6: The public were voting for which Housemate they wanted to win, rather than to evict.

== Ratings ==
Episode	from 3 years		14- to 49-year-old	
Episode	Viewers (in millions)	Share (in %)	Viewers (in millions)	Share (in %)
1	2.22	9.6	1.20	14.7
2	2.07	11.3	1.11	16.2
3	2.18	11.6	1.19	16.1
4	2.03	11.0	1.02	14.2
5	2.20	12.2	1.19	17.0
6	2.42	14.4	1.28	19.4
7	2.37	13.9	1.26	19.2
8	2.57	11.4	1.34	17.7
9	2.10	11.1	1.05	15.2
10	2.29	13.5	1.14	17.6
11	2.52	15.0	1.33	19.9
12	2.47	14.4	1.22	18.6
13	2.59	14.9	1.35	20.0
14	2.74	16.8	1.53	23.4
15	2.89	12.4	1.61	19.4
