= Promi Big Brother season 11 =

Season of Promi Big Brother

Promi Big Brother
- Season 11
- Presented by: Jochen Schropp; Marlene Lufen
- No. of days: 17
- No. of housemates: 13
- Winner: Yeliz Koc
- Runner-up: Marco Strecker
- Companion show: Die Late Night Show
- No. of episodes: 15

Release
- Original network: Sat.1
- Original release: 20 November – 4 December 2023

Additional information
- Filming dates: 18 November – 4 December 2023

Season chronology
- ← Previous; Season 10 Next → Season 12

Promi Big Brother 2023, also known as Promi Big Brother 11, is the eleventh season of the German reality television series Promi Big Brother. The show began airing on 20 November 2023 on Sat.1, with the 24/7 live feed returning two days earlier. It was the eleventh celebrity season and the twelfth season of the Big Brother franchise to air on Sat.1 to date. Jochen Schropp and Marlene Lufen both returned as hosts of the show.

Yeliz Koc was announced as the winner of the season, with Marco Strecker as the runner-up.

== Spin-off shows ==
=== Die Late Night Show ===
The live late-night show with the name Die Late Night Show will return air every day after the main show on Sat.1. Jochen Bendel and Melissa Khalaj will return as hosts of the late-night show. Special guests joined the presenter duo to analyze the situation of the show and it also features exclusive live broadcasts from the house.

== Housemates ==
Celebrity	Age on entry	Notability	Day entered	Day exited	Status
Yeliz Koc	30	Reality TV personality	1	17	Winner
Marco Strecker	21	Influencer, TikTok streamer	3	17	Runner-up
Peter Klein	56	Stepfather of Daniela Katzenberger, reality TV personality	1	17	3rd place
Paulina Ljubas	26	Reality TV personality	1	17	4th place
Matthias Mangiapane	40	Reality TV personality	1	17	5th place
Dilara Kruse	32	Wife of footballer Max Kruse	1	16	Evicted
Dominik Stuckmann	31	Bachelor on Der Bachelor 2022	1	15	Evicted
Iris Klein	56	Mother of Daniela Katzenberger, reality TV personality, Big Brother 10 housemate	3	14	Evicted
Manuela Wisbeck	40	Actress	1	13	Evicted
Ron Bielecki	25	Influencer, streamer	1	12	Evicted
Jürgen Milski	59	Singer, reality TV personality, runner-up of Big Brother 1	1	11	Evicted
Philo Kotnik	41	Magician	1	10	Evicted
Patricia Blanco	52	Daughter of Roberto Blanco, reality TV personality, Big Brother 9 housemate	1	8	Evicted

== Nominations table ==
	Round 1					Day 9	Day 10	Day 11		Day 12	Day 13	Day 15	Day 16	Day 17 Final				Nominations received
	Day 3	Day 4	Day 5	Day 6	Day 7	Day 9	Day 10	Round 1	Round 2	Day 12	Day 13	Day 15	Day 16	Round 1	Round 2	Round 3		Nominations received
Container Boss	Jürgen	Philo	Paulina			Marco		Matthias			Yeliz	Paulina	none					
Yeliz	Manuela	Philo	Matthias	Manuela, Patricia	Not eligible	No nominations	Philo	Manuela	Not eligible	No nominations	Marco, Iris, Matthias	Marco, Matthias	Marco	Safe	Safe	Winner (Day 17)		1
Marco	Not in House	Iris	Ron	Not eligible	Not eligible	No nominations	Ron	Jürgen	Not eligible	Exempt	Not eligible	Dominik, Peter	Dilara	Safe	Nominated	Runner-up (Day 17)		7
Peter	Paulina	Iris	Marco	Not eligible	Not eligible	No nominations	Nominated	Paulina	Not eligible	No nominations	Not eligible	Dominik, Paulina	Paulina	Safe	Safe	Third place (Day 17)		6
Paulina	Patricia	Dominik	Patricia	Patricia, Ron	Ron	No nominations	Ron	Peter	Not eligible	No nominations	Not eligible	Dominik, Peter	Peter	Nominated	Nominated	Fourth place (Day 17)		8
Matthias	Ron	Iris	Ron	Patricia, Ron	Philo	Exempt	Ron	Ron	Dominik, Iris, Ron	No nominations	Not eligible	Dominik, Peter	Yeliz	Nominated	Fifth place (Day 17)			7
Dilara	Dominik	Dominik	Matthias	Dominik, Patricia	Not eligible	No nominations	Philo	Jürgen	Not eligible	No nominations	Not eligible	Dominik, Marco	Paulina	Evicted (Day 16)				6
Dominik	Paulina	Manuela	Dilara	Manuela, Peter	Not eligible	Exempt	Philo	Iris	Not eligible	No nominations	Not eligible	Dilara, Matthias	Evicted (Day 15)					14
Iris	Not in House	Matthias	Matthias	Not eligible	Marco	No nominations	Philo	Jürgen	Not eligible	No nominations	Not eligible	Evicted (Day 14)						9
Manuela	Dominik	Dominik	Dominik	Not eligible	Not eligible	Exempt	Philo	Ron	Not eligible	No nominations	Evicted (Day 13)							6
Ron	Paulina	Iris	Matthias	Not eligible	Not eligible	No nominations	Nominated	Iris	Not eligible	Evicted (Day 12)								10
Jürgen	Paulina	Iris	Dilara	Not eligible	Not eligible	No nominations	Ron	Ron	Evicted (Day 11)									3
Philo	Patricia	Iris	Marco	Manuela, Marco	Not eligible	No nominations	Nominated	Evicted (Day 10)										4
Patricia	Philo	Philo	Dilara	Not eligible	Dilara	Evicted (Day 8)												7
Notes	1					2	3	none	4	5	6	7	8	none				
Nominated	Iris, Matthias, Patricia, Paulina, Ron					Dilara, Iris, Jürgen, Marco, Paulina, Peter, Philo, Ron, Yeliz	Peter, Philo, Ron	Jürgen, Ron	Dominik, Iris, Ron	Dilara, Dominik, Iris, Manuela, Paulina, Peter, Philo, Yeliz	Marco, Iris, Matthias	Dominik, Peter	Dilara, Marco, Paulina, Peter, Yeliz	Matthias, Paulina	Marco, Paulina	Marco, Peter, Yeliz		
Evicted	Patricia; Fewest votes to save					Philo; 5 of 9 votes to evict		Jurgen; Fewest votes to save	Ron; Fewest votes to save	Manuela; Fewest votes to save	Iris; Fewest votes to save	Dominik; Fewest votes to save	Dilara; Fewest votes to save	Matthias; Fewest votes to save	Paulina; Fewest votes to save	Peter; Fewest votes (out of 3) to win	Marco; 48.3 % (out of 2) to win	
Evicted	Patricia; Fewest votes to save					Philo; 5 of 9 votes to evict		Jurgen; Fewest votes to save	Ron; Fewest votes to save	Manuela; Fewest votes to save	Iris; Fewest votes to save	Dominik; Fewest votes to save	Dilara; Fewest votes to save	Matthias; Fewest votes to save	Paulina; Fewest votes to save	Yeliz; 51.7 % (out of 2) to win		

=== Notes ===
- ^Note 1: The first round of nominations were held over five days. On Day 6, Paulina, as Container Boss, and five housemates of her choice were allowed to nominate. On Day 7, only the already nominated were allowed to nominate. As it resulted in a four-way tie, Paulina, as Container Boss, cast the deciding vote for Ron.
- ^Note 2: Big Brother put all housemates up for eviction. On Day 9, Marco, as Container Boss, saved Dominik, Matthias and Manuela from eviction. The remaining nine housemates faced a public vote to save. The three housemates with the fewest votes would face eviction.
- ^Note 3: On Day 10, Peter, Philo, and Ron, received the fewest votes and faced eviction by the remaining housemates. Philo received the most votes to evict.
- ^Note 4: As the Container Boss, Matthias has to choose three housemates to be up for eviction.
- ^Note 5: As the Container Boss, Matthias has to choose a housemate to be saved from the public vote.
- ^Note 6: As the Container Boss, Yeliz has to choose three housemates to be up for eviction.
- ^Note 7: On Day 14, as the Container Boss, Dilara had to choose a housemate to have immunity.
- ^Note 8: On Day 15, as the Container Boss, Paulina was allowed to send one person directly to the final and chose Matthias, who therefore received immunity.
