= Promi Big Brother season 2 =

Promi Big Brother
- Season 2
- Presented by: Jochen Schropp
- No. of days: 17
- No. of contestants: 12
- Winner: Aaron Troschke
- Runner-up: Claudia Effenberg
- Companion shows: Promi Big Brother – Die Late Night Show; Promi Big Brother – Die Webshow
- No. of episodes: 15

Release
- Original network: Sat.1
- Original release: 15 August – 29 August 2014

Season chronology
- ← Previous; Season 1 Next → Season 3

The second series of Promi Big Brother started on 15 August 2014 and ended on 29 August 2014. It is the second series of the Big Brother franchise on Sat.1, after it left RTL II. Twelve celebrity housemates ("promis") entered the house on Day 1. The show is hosted by Jochen Schropp.

== Format ==
Promis had participated in tasks and matches for treats or to avoid punishments. Daily nominations also took place (from Day 8 to 14). Furthermore, the house consists of two floors, the upper luxury floor and the lower poverty floor. Housemates on the luxury floor choose of the poor housemates to join them upstairs, whilst the public will vote one of the 7 downstairs.

== House ==
This year's Promi Big Brother contains two floors, each floor having its separate living areas, bathrooms, bedrooms and diary rooms. The upper floor is luxurious, whilst the lower floor is meager with no beds or real seatings.

== Promis ==
Originally seven celebrity housemates entered upstairs on Day 3, whilst other five entered downstairs two days earlier (Day 1).

Celebrity	Age on entry	Notability	Day entered	Day exited	Status
Aaron Troschke	24	Famous quiz contestant and media personality (heritage from Russia)	1	17	Winner
Claudia Effenberg	49	Model/footballer's wife	3	17	Runner-up
Ronald Schill	55	Former politician and judge	3	17	Third place
Paul Janke	30	Reality TV star (The Bachelor)	1	17	Fourth place
Michael Wendler	42	Singer	3	17	Fifth place
Hubert Kah	55	80es pop icon	3	16	Evicted
Alexandra Rietz	43	Scripted crime series actress	1	15	Evicted
Mia Julia Brückner	27	Porn star / Ballermann performer	1	14	Evicted
Liz Baffoe	44	Soap actress (heritage from Ghana)	3	13	Evicted
Ela Tas	22	Reality TV contestant (heritage from Turkey)	3	12	Evicted
Mario-Max Prinz zu Schaumburg-Lippe	36	Royalty (originally from Austria)	3	11	Evicted
Janina Youssefian	33	Model (heritage from Iran)	1	10	Evicted

== Nominations table ==
	Day 10	Day 11	Day 12	Day 13	Day 14	Day 15	Day 16	Day 17 Final		Nominations received
Aaron	Janina	Mario-Max	No nominations	Alexandra	Hubert	Aaron	Michael	Winner (Day 17)		8
Claudia	Hubert	Mario-Max	No nominations	Hubert	Mia	Claudia	Hubert	Runner-Up (Day 17)		2
Ronald	Mario-Max	Paul	No nominations	Hubert	Paul	Aaron	Aaron	Third place (Day 17)		2
Paul	Janina	Liz	No nominations	Liz	Hubert	Paul	Hubert	Fourth place (Day 17)		3
Michael	Hubert	Mario-Max	No nominations	Hubert	Aaron	Aaron	Aaron	Fifth place (Day 17)		3
Hubert	Ela	Aaron	No nominations	Michael	Aaron; Mia	Alexandra	Claudia	Evicted (Day 16)		11
Alexandra	Ronald	Liz	No nominations	Liz	Ronald	Michael	Evicted (Day 15)			4
Mia	Janina	Mario-Max	No nominations	Liz	Hubert	Evicted (Day 14)				2
Liz	Janina	Alexandra	No nominations	Alexandra	Evicted (Day 13)					6
Ela	Hubert	Liz	No nominations	Evicted (Day 12)						1
Mario-Max	Janina	Mia	Evicted (Day 11)							6
Janina	Mario-Max	Evicted (Day 10)								5
Notes	none						none			
Up for Eviction	Hubert, Janina	Liz, Mario-Max	Aaron, Alexandra, Claudia, Ela, Hubert, Liz, Mia, Michael, Paul, Ronald	Hubert, Liz	Hubert, Mia	Aaron, Alexandra, Claudia, Michael, Paul	Aaron, Hubert	Aaron, Claudia, Michael, Paul, Ronald		
Evicted	Janina; Fewest votes to save	Mario-Max; Fewest votes to save	Ela; Fewest votes to save	Liz; Fewest votes to save	Mia; Fewest votes to save	Alexandra; Fewest votes to save	Hubert; Fewest votes to save	Michael; 6.46 % (out of 5)	Paul; 7.15 % (out of 4)	
Evicted	Janina; Fewest votes to save	Mario-Max; Fewest votes to save	Ela; Fewest votes to save	Liz; Fewest votes to save	Mia; Fewest votes to save	Alexandra; Fewest votes to save	Hubert; Fewest votes to save	Ronald; 22.98 % (out of 3)	Claudia; 33.75 % (out of 2)	
Evicted	Janina; Fewest votes to save	Mario-Max; Fewest votes to save	Ela; Fewest votes to save	Liz; Fewest votes to save	Mia; Fewest votes to save	Alexandra; Fewest votes to save	Hubert; Fewest votes to save	Aaron; 66.25 % to win		

- Housemates living downstairs after week 1.
- Housemates living upstairs after week 1.

=== Notes ===
- All housemates downstairs won immunity because one housemate from there was already evicted, to equilibrate the numbers.
- By default, everyone faced the public vote.
- Housemates nominated face-to-face. Housemates was only allowed to nominate within each team. The housemates of either team with the most votes face the public vote.
- The housemate with the most nominations had to choose with whom he or she would face the public vote.
- Housemates are allowed to nominate themselves. Every housemate with at least one nomination faces the public vote.

== Ratings ==
Episode	from 3 years		14- to 49-year-old	
Episode	Viewers (in millions)	Share (in %)	Viewers (in millions)	Share (in %)
1	3.16	12.2	1.79	18.9
2	2.84	13.5	1.61	19.6
3	2.67	12.4	1.44	17.5
4	2.62	12.9	1.27	15.7
5	2.88	15.2	1.52	18.9
6	2.72	15.4	1.41	18.6
7	3.14	17.7	1.68	22.4
8	3.01	11.4	1.57	16.0
9	3.02	14.3	1.62	19.4
10	2.78	14.7	1.49	18.1
11	2.80	15.6	1.44	19.1
12	2.87	16.0	1.46	19.9
13	2.86	15.8	1.44	19.0
14	2.88	15.1	1.54	19.4
15	3.03	12.3	1.64	19.4
