= Promi Big Brother season 4 =

Promi Big Brother
- Season 4
- Presented by: Jochen Schropp
- No. of days: 17
- No. of contestants: 13
- Winner: Ben Tewaag
- Runner-up: Cathy Lugner
- Companion shows: Promi Big Brother – Die Late Night Show; Promi Big Brother – Newsshow
- No. of episodes: 15

Release
- Original network: Sat.1
- Original release: 2 September – 16 September 2016

Season chronology
- ← Previous; Season 3 Next → Season 5

The fourth series of Promi Big Brother started on 2 September 2016 and ended on 16 September 2016. It was the fourth series of the Big Brother franchise on Sat.1, after it left RTL II. 5 celebrity housemates ("promis") entered the house on Day 1 and the other 7 celebrities entered on Day 3. The show was hosted by Jochen Schropp.

== Format ==
Promis had participated in tasks and matches for treats or to avoid punishments. Daily nominations also took place (from Day 8 to 14). Furthermore, the house consists of two floors, the upper luxury floor and the lower poverty floor. Housemates on the luxury floor will choose of the poor housemates to join them upstairs, whilst the public will vote one of the 7 downstairs.

== House ==
This year's Promi Big Brother contains two floors, each floor having their separate living areas, bathrooms, bedrooms and diary rooms. The upper floor will be luxurious, whilst the lower floor is meager with no beds or real seating. This years the downstairs area was changed into a sewerage.

== Housemates ==
Celebrity	Age on entry	Notability	Day entered	Day exited	Status
Ben Tewaag	40	Actor, son of Uschi Glas	3	17	Winner
Cathy Lugner	26	Playmate and wife of Richard Lugner	3	17	Runner-up
Mario Basler	47	Former football player	3	17	3rd Place
Natascha Ochsenknecht	52	Actress and former wife of Uwe Ochsenknecht	3	17	4th Place
Jessica Paszka	26	Model and reality TV personality	1	17	5th Place
Frank Stäbler	27	Olympic Wrestler	1	16	Evicted
Joachim Witt	68	Singer	3	15	Evicted
Isa Jank	64	Actress	3	15	Evicted
Marcus Prinz von Anhalt	49	Adoptive Prince, former night club owner	3	13	Evicted
Robin Bade	35	Former call-in game show host	7	12	Evicted
Stephen Dürr	42	Actor	1	11	Evicted
Dolly Dollar	54	Actress	1	10	Evicted
Edona James	29	Reality TV Personality, erotic model, and DJ	1	6	Ejected

== Distribution of housemates ==
As in the last two seasons, the participants were distributed before the broadcast of the show by the producers in the respective areas. From the first show, the participants and the audience could change the distribution of the housemates in each case by voting and using the Duel Arena.

Areas and Housemates
Date	Upstairs Housemates	Downstairs Housemates	Reason
31 August and 1 September 2016	Dolly, Edona, Jessica, Stephen and Frank moved in the Downstairs area on the 31 August		
31 August and 1 September 2016	—	Dolly; Edona; Jessica; Stephen; Frank	
2 September 2016	Natascha, Joachim, Mario, Ben, Cathy, Isa and Marcus moved in the Upstairs area during the first live show		
2 September 2016	Marcus changed the area and moved downstairs		Public vote
2 September 2016	Natascha; Joachim; Mario; Ben; Cathy; Isa	Dolly; Edona; Jessica; Stephen; Frank; Marcus ▼	
3. September 2016	Frank and Jessica changed the from down to upstairs		Duel Arena
3. September 2016	Natascha and Ben changed from upstairs to downstairs		Duel Arena
3. September 2016	Dolly changed the from down to upstairs		Decision by the upstairs housemates
3. September 2016	Cathy changed from upstairs to downstairs		Public vote
3. September 2016	Joachim; Mario; Isa; Jessica ▲ Frank ▲ Dolly ▲	Edona; Stephen; Marcus; Cathy ▼ Ben ▼ Natascha ▼	
4 September 2016	Stephen changed the from down to upstairs		Decision by the upstairs housemates
4 September 2016	Isa changed from upstairs to downstairs		Public vote
4 September 2016	Joachim; Mario; Jessica; Frank; Dolly; Stephen▲	Edona; Marcus; Cathy; Ben; Natascha; Isa▼	
5 September 2016	Natascha changed the from down to upstairs		Decision by the upstairs housemates
5 September 2016	Mario changed from upstairs to downstairs		Public vote
5 September 2016	Joachim; Jessica; Frank; Dolly; Stephen; Natascha▲	~~Edona~~; Marcus; Cathy; Ben; Isa; Mario▼	Edona was ejected because she broke several rules
6 September 2016	Robin moved in the downstairs area		Replacement for Edona
6 September 2016	Marcus changed the from down to upstairs		Decision by Joachim
6 September 2016	Frank changed from upstairs to downstairs		Decision by Robin
6 September 2016	Joachim; Jessica; Dolly; Stephen; Natascha; Marcus▲	Cathy; Ben; Isa; Mario; Robin; Frank▼	
7 September 2016	Cathy changed the from down to upstairs		Decision by the upstairs housemates
7 September 2016	Jessica changed from upstairs to downstairs		Public vote
7 September 2016	Joachim; Dolly; Stephen; Natascha; Marcus; Cathy▲	Ben; Isa; Mario; Robin; Frank; Jessica▼	
8 September 2016	Isa changed the from down to upstairs		The upstairs Housemates chose Ben but he gave this opportunity to Isa
8 September 2016	Isa changed from upstairs to downstairs		Public vote
8 September 2016	Joachim; Dolly; Stephen; Natascha; Marcus; Cathy	Ben; Isa▲▼ Mario; Robin; Frank; Jessica	
9 September 2016	The two Teams changed the areas		Duel Arena
9 September 2016	Ben▲ Isa▲ Mario▲ Robin▲ Frank▲ Jessica▲	Joachim▼ ~~Dolly~~▼ Stephen▼ Natascha▼ Marcus▼ Cathy▼	Dolly got the fewest votes and was evicted.
10 September 2016	Robin and Joachim changed the areas		Duel Arena
10 September 2016	Ben; Isa; Mario; Frank; Jessica; Joachim▲	~~Stephen~~; Natascha; Marcus; Cathy; Robin▼	Stephen got the fewest votes and was evicted.
11 September 2016	Isa changed from upstairs to downstairs		Isa changed voluntarily the areas.
11 September 2016	Ben; Mario; Frank; Jessica; Joachim	Natascha; Marcus; Cathy; ~~Robin~~; Isa▼	Robin got the fewest votes and was evicted.
12 September 2016	Joachim changed from upstairs to downstairs		The upstairs housemate had to decide but after not doing it the public vote decided.
12 September 2016	Ben; Mario; Frank; Jessica	Natascha; ~~Marcus~~; Cathy; Isa; Joachim▼	Marcus got the fewest votes and was evicted.
13 September 2016	Natascha and Cathy changed to the upstairs area		Duel Arena
13 September 2016	Jessica and Frank changed to the downstairs area		Duel Arena
13 September 2016	Ben; Mario; Natascha▲ Cathy▲	Isa; Joachim; Jessica▼ Frank▼	No one got evicted. The Eviction took place on 14 September.
14 September 2016	Ben; Mario; Natascha; Cathy	~~Isa~~; ~~Joachim~~; Jessica; Frank	Isa got the fewest votes and was evicted (First Voting). Joachim got the fewest votes and was evicted (Second Voting).
15 September 2016	All housemates of the upstairs area changed to the downstairs area		On Big Brother's command
15 September 2016	—	Jessica; ~~Frank~~; Ben▼ Mario▼ Natascha▼ Cathy▼	Frank got the fewest votes and was evicted.
16 September 2016	—	Ben; ~~Cathy~~; ~~Mario~~; ~~Natascha~~; ~~Jessica~~	Jessica received the fewest votes and finished in fifth place followed by Natascha in fourth place, Mario in third place and Cathy as the runner-up. Ben received the most votes and was announced as the winner.

== Duel Arena ==
As in the previous duels between the Duels also took place this year. Big Brother (voiced by Phil Daub) each appoint one or two residents from the "house" who must compete at the Duel Arena. In the Duel Arena they both played a game and the loser must face the consequences for his living area. A draw always win the inhabitants in the "upstairs". The duels each can either have a positive impact on the winners section or consequences for the loser section. So must for example, the losing team changing areas, receives less food or have to give personal items.

Duels
Date	Upstairs Housemates	Downstairs Housemates	Game	Winner	Consequence
2 September 2016	Cathy; Joachim	Dolly; Jessica	"Rotating carousel"	Cathy; Joachim	No consequences: Housemates keep their areas
3 September 2016	Benjamin (Supporter: Natascha)	Frank (Supporter: Jessica)	"Fresh laundry"	Frank; Jessica	Reward: Frank and Jessica changed the area with Natasha and Benjamin
4 September 2016	Mario; Isa	Marcus; Edona	"Color-blind"	Mario; Isa	Punishment: Markus and Edona must wear a T-shirt with two necklines in the next 24 hours
5 September 2016	Dolly; Joachim; Stephen	Ben; Marcus; Natascha	"Human Simon Says"	Dolly; Joachim; Stephen	Reward: A fancy dress party for the upper housemates.
6 September 2016	Joachim	Robin	"Card House Shocker"	Joachim	Reward: Joachim has to choose one housemate to move upstairs, Robin has to choose one housemate to move downstairs.
7 September 2016	Dolly; Jessica; Joachim; Marcus	Ben; Cathy; Isa; Robin	"Finger Hooks"	Dolly; Jessica; Joachim; Marcus	Reward: The winning team will live upstairs.
8 September 2016	Stephen	Mario	"Wire Coat Hanger Balance"	Stephen	Reward/Punishment: The winner of duel will be immune from the first eviction, the loser will face the first eviction.
9 September 2016	Dolly; Marcus	Frank; Jessica	"Mud Ball"	Frank; Jessica	Reward/Punishment: The team of the winning housemates will live upstairs, the team of the losing housemates will live downstairs.
9 September 2016	Jessica; Mario; Robin	Cathy; Natascha; Stephen	"Showing Teeth"	Cathy; Natascha; Stephen	Reward: A phone call from home for Stephen.
10 September 2016	Robin	Joachim	"Operation hip swing"	Joachim	Reward: Joachim changed the area with Robin.
11 September 2016	Mario	Marcus	"Brain training"	Marcus	Reward: Marcus won immunity from elimination but later gave it to Natascha; Punishment: Mario faced the nomination.
12 September 2016	Ben; Frank; Jessica	Cathy; Marcus; Natascha	"Cold chain"	Ben; Frank; Jessica	Reward: The winning team received video messages from their family and friends.
13 September 2016	Ben; Frank; Jessica; Mario	Cathy; Joachim; Natascha; Isa	"Poker"	Mario; Natascha; Ben; Cathy	Reward: All housemates competed in pairs of two consisted of the two areas. The four winners of the four duels changed to the upstairs area.
14 September 2016	Cathy; Mario	Jessica; Joachim	"Tandem bike"	Cathy; Mario	Reward: The winners got two nomination votes. Punishment: The Losers were not allowed to nominate.
15 September 2016	—N/a	Ben, Frank	"Slap Quiz"	Ben	Reward/Punishment: The winner of duel will be immune from the last eviction, the loser will face the last eviction.

- All housemates lived after the merge at downstairs. Therefore, there were two housemates competing from the same area.

== Nominations table ==
– Downstairs Housemates after week 1
– Upstairs Housemates after week 1
– Immune from nomination
– Nominated before the actual nomination
– This round of nominations were to save.

	Day 10	Day 11	Day 12	Day 13	Day 14	Day 15	Day 16	Day 17 Final		Nominations received
Ben	Isa	No nominations	Robin, Marcus	Frank	Mario	Joachim	Mario	Winner (Day 17)		6
Cathy	Marcus	No nominations	Jessica, Marcus	Marcus	Frank	Jessica, Natascha	Mario	Runner-Up (Day 17)		7
Mario	Isa	No nominations	Robin, Isa	Isa	Natascha	Joachim, Cathy	Cathy	Third Place (Day 17)		3
Natascha	Cathy	No nominations	Isa, Jessica	Cathy	Mario	Joachim	Mario	Fourth Place (Day 17)		1
Jessica	Isa	No nominations	Robin, Marcus	Marcus	Ben	Not eligible	Cathy	Fifth Place (Day 17)		4
Frank	Isa	No nominations	Robin, Joachim	Ben	Jessica	Cathy	Cathy	Evicted (Day 16)		1
Joachim	Dolly	No nominations	Marcus, Isa	Marcus	Frank	Not eligible	Evicted (Day 15)			9
Isa	Ben	No nominations	Joachim, Ben	Ben	Cathy	Evicted (Day 15)				8
Marcus	Joachim	No nominations	Robin, Joachim	Joachim	Evicted (Day 13)					8
Robin	Ben	No nominations	Jessica, Ben	Evicted (Day 12)						5
Stephen	Dolly	No nominations	Evicted (Day 11)							0
Dolly	Joachim	Evicted (Day 10)								2
Edona	Ejected (Day 6)									N/A
Nomination notes	1, 2, 3	4	5	6	7	8	9	none		
Against public vote	Dolly, Isa, Joachim, Mario	All Housemates	Marcus, Mario, Robin	Ben, Marcus	Isa, Joachim	Cathy, Joachim	Cathy, Frank, Mario	Ben, Cathy, Jessica, Mario, Natascha		
Ejected	Edona	none								
Evicted	Dolly; Fewest votes to save	Stephen; Fewest votes to save	Robin; Fewest votes to save	Marcus; Fewest votes to save	Isa; Fewest votes to save	Joachim; Fewest votes to save	Frank; Fewest votes to save	Jessica; Fewest votes (out of 5)	Natascha; Fewest votes (out of 4)	
Evicted	Dolly; Fewest votes to save	Stephen; Fewest votes to save	Robin; Fewest votes to save	Marcus; Fewest votes to save	Isa; Fewest votes to save	Joachim; Fewest votes to save	Frank; Fewest votes to save	Mario; Fewest votes (out of 3)	Cathy; Fewest votes (out of 2)	
Evicted	Dolly; Fewest votes to save	Stephen; Fewest votes to save	Robin; Fewest votes to save	Marcus; Fewest votes to save	Isa; Fewest votes to save	Joachim; Fewest votes to save	Frank; Fewest votes to save	Ben; Most votes to win		

== Notes ==
- ^Note 1: On Day 6 Edona was ejected because she broke several rules.
- ^Note 2: Stephen was immune from the first nomination after winning the duel on Day 9, while Mario was immediately nominated after he lost the duel.
- ^Note 3: The housemates were only allowed to nominate a housemate in their area.
- ^Note 4: On Day 11 all housemates faced the public vote.
- ^Note 5: Marcus was immune from the third nomination after winning the duel on Day 12 but he gave it to Natascha, while Mario was immediately nominated after he lost the duel.
- ^Note 6: The housemates had to nominate face to face.
- ^Note 7: The housemates had to choose a housemate to be protected, so to be immune from the public vote rather than nominate. The housemates with the fewest votes to be immune would be nominated. No one got evicted on Day 14 the public could vote for 24 hours and the eviction took place on Day 15.
- ^Note 8: After the eviction from Day 14 the housemates took place in a duel. The winners, Cathy and Mario, could nominate twice and it didn't matter if both votes went to the same person, while the losers, Jessica and Joachim, were not allowed not nominate.
- ^Note 9: Ben was immune from the last nomination after winning the duel on Day 16, while Frank was immediately nominated after losing the duel. Also the housemates had to nominate face to face.

== Ratings ==
Ratings
Episode	Viewers (in millions)			Share (in %)		
Episode	Total	14 - 49 Years	14 - 59 Years	Total	14 - 49 Years	14 - 59 Years
1	2.28	1.18	1.67	9.9	15.4	13.7
2	1.84	0.94	1.35	9.8	14.2	12.8
3	1.76	0.87	1.26	9.0	11.3	10.8
4	1.99	1.00	1.44	10.7	14.0	13.2
5	2.01	0.91	1.37	11.5	13.1	12.9
6	1.98	0.89	1.33	11.7	13.4	13.2
7	2.11	1.05	1.45	12.4	16.0	14.8
8	1.96	0.90	-	8.2	11.0	-
9	1.74	0.84	1.19	9.0	11.6	10.6
10	1.86	0.87	1.26	10.1	11.8	11.4
11	1.84	0.79	1.20	10.7	11.3	11.5
12	2.03	0.93	1.37	12.0	13.9	13.3
13	1.79	0.84	1.17	10.6	12.5	11.5
14	2.04	0.88	1.42	11.9	13.3	13.9
15	2.06	0.95	1.48	8.0	10.6	10.5
