= Milo Moiré =

Swiss performance artist

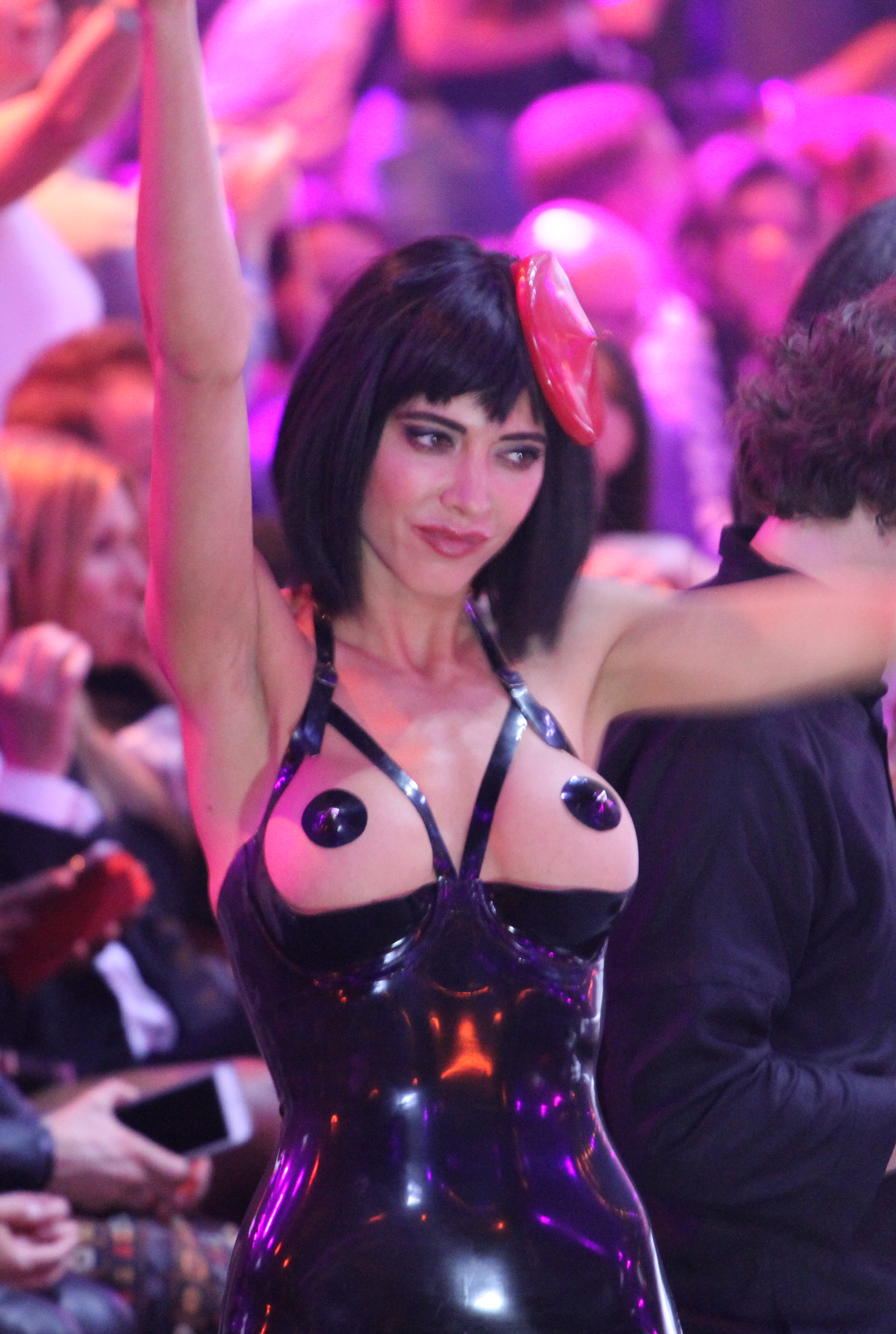
- Moiré in 2016
- Born: 7 May 1983 (age 43)
- Known for: Performance art
- Website: milomoire.com

Milo Moiré (French: [milo mwaʁe]; born 7 May 1983) is a Swiss pornographic performer and conceptual artist who produces nude performances and uses her body in her art. Moiré's performance art pieces include PlopEgg, The Script System No.2, and Mirror Box.

== Early life and education ==
Moiré was born in Switzerland, of Slovak and Spanish origin. She has an art school background and a master's degree in psychology from the University of Bern, Switzerland (2011).

== Career ==
=== 2014 ===
Moiré's PlopEgg No. 1, performed at Art Cologne 2014, was a work of action painting that involved the expelling of paint filled eggs from her vagina onto a canvas, thus creating an abstract work of art. The eggs contained ink and acrylic paint. A video description of the work states "At the end of this almost meditative art birth performance the stained canvas is folded up, smoothed and unfolded to a symmetrically reflected picture, astonishingly coloured and full of [strength]." The folding of the resulting canvas created a work which has been compared to a Rorschach test and a womb. Moiré writes: "To create art, I use the original source of femininity – my vagina."

=== 2016 ===
In June 2014, for The Script System No. 2, Moiré travelled to Art Basel naked with the names of items of clothing marked on her body in paint; she was refused entry, forcing her to dress to enter the exhibition. Of The Script System, she has said "[it] is inspired by the script theory of cognitive psychology. Each of us knows these scripts (e.g. restaurant script), recurrent, stereotyped action sequences, after which we work every day. Especially early in the morning on the way to work, we work almost automatically, often without awareness of our environment. These everyday blindness I wanted to break through my performance." Moiré claims that lacking an outer shell of clothes, the human body regains its ability to communicate without the distractions of money, fashion, ideology or even time. The experience of the art viewer is also transformed with the reaction or non-reaction of the public an integral part of the performance. Her first nude performance was in 2007 and she has performed nude ever since in order to provide an authentic and unmediated experience.

In 2016, she performed naked to protest the 2015 New Year Eve sexual attacks in Germany.

=== Mirror Box ===
For the project titled Mirror Box, Moiré walked around several European cities wearing a large mirrored box which covered part of her body. Using a megaphone to attract attention, she would then invite strangers to place their hands inside the box, and fondle either her breasts or vulva for a 30-second period. The performance took place during the summer of 2016 in the cities of Düsseldorf, Amsterdam, and London. In Düsseldorf, Moiré performed with a mirror box covering her breasts. In the other two cities, she used two boxes, one covering her breasts and another over her genitals. Moiré was arrested and fined during the London performance. Mirror Box pays homage to the work "Tap and Touch Cinema" by Valie Export, performed from 1968 to 1971.

== Reception ==
Moiré has deliberately placed herself on the interface between art and pornography with videos on her website described as "uncensored" that are available to view for a fee, and the naked performance of her works inviting the act of censorship by media outlets. Moiré has said that there should be no limit to art and that death is the only limit she accepts. She has cited Marina Abramović and Joseph Beuys as particular influences.

Writing about PlopEgg in The Guardian in a piece entitled, "The artist who lays eggs with her vagina – or why performance art is so silly", Jonathan Jones commented, "And yet it's not a strong statement at all. It is absurd, gratuitous, trite and desperate. Anywhere but an art gathering, this would be regarded as a satire on modern cultural emptiness." Jess Denham in The Independent commented, "Not long ago there was Lady Gaga's 'vomit artist', but now Milo Moiré is making her look tame", adding, "the latest desperate effort to shock in the name of art."

== Arrests ==
In 2015, Moiré was arrested by French police, and spent the night in the cells, after posing for naked selfies with tourists in front of the Eiffel Tower.

== Personal life ==
Moiré is single and lives in Düsseldorf.

== Selected works ==
- The Script System No. 1, performance video, 2013.
- The Split Brain, video, 2013.
- The Script System No. 2, performance video, Art Basel, 2014.
- PlopEgg No. 1 – A Birth of a Picture, performance work, 2014.
