= Marijke Amado =

Dutch television presenter

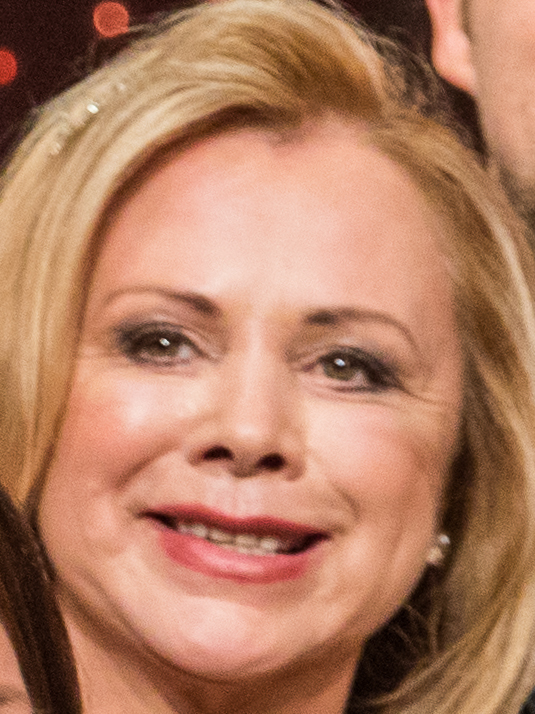
Marijke Amado

Marijke Amado (born 1 February 1954, in Tilburg) is a Dutch television presenter, who is mainly active on German television.

== Life ==
From 1980 to 1990 she presented the television show WWF Club by German broadcaster WDR. In Germany, Amado became famous for her television presentation of a show called Mini Playback Show between 1990 and 1998. She was guest in different German television shows, for example Alfredissimo, Zimmer frei!, Blond am Freitag, Planet Wissen, Kachelmanns Spätausgabe, Das perfekte Promi-Dinner, Volle Kanne, Lafer!Lichter!Lecker!, Samstag Abend, Weck Up or Das NRW-Duell. Amado lives in Lanaken.

== Works ==
- Mr. Bink - Vom Traummann zum Albtraum, Riva-Verlag, 20

== Literature ==
- Ingo Schiweck: Laß dich überraschen... - Niederländische Unterhaltungskünstler in Deutschland nach 1945, Agenda-Verlag, 2005.
