= 2000 in German television =

This is a list of German television related events from 2000.

== Events ==
- 18 February - Stefan Raab is selected to represent Germany at the 2000 Eurovision Song Contest with his song "Wadde hadde dudde da?". He is selected to be the forty-fifth German Eurovision entry during Countdown Grand Prix held at the Stadthalle in Bremen.
- 28 February - The German version of Big Brother debuts on RTL 2.
- 9 June - The first season of Big Brother Germany is won by John Mitz.
- 30 December - Alida-Nadine Kuras wins the second season of Big Brother Germany.

== Debuts ==
=== Domestic ===
- 31 January - Zwei Asse und ein König (2000) (ZDF)
- 28 February - Big Brother Germany (2000–2011, 2015–present) (RTL II)
- 12 October - Donna Leon (2000–2019) (ARD)
- 14 November - Anniversaries (2000) (ARD)

=== International ===
- 8 January - (Canada) / (Germany) / (United States) Rainbow Fish (1998–2000) (Sat. 1)
- 12 March - (United States) The Sopranos (1999–2007) (ZDF)
- 6 April - (United States) / (France) Littlest Pet Shop (1995) (K-Toon)
- 25 April - (United States) The Brothers Flub (1999–2000) (Super RTL)
- 29 April - (United Kingdom) / (United States) / (Canada) Anthony Ant (1999) (ZDF)
- 29 July - (Canada) / (France) Mona the Vampire (1999–2006) (ZDF)
- 4 September - (United States) Futurama (1999-2003, 2008–2013) (ProSieben)
- 8 September - (United Kingdom) / (Canada) Watership Down (1999–2001) (Super RTL)
- 8 October - (Canada) / (Hong Kong) Eckhart (2000–2002) (Super RTL)
- 17 November - (United States) Johnny Bravo (1997–2004) (ORF 1)

== Military Television Debuts ==
=== BFBS ===
- 14 January - (United Kingdom) / (Canada) Rotten Ralph (1998–2001)
- 14 January - (United States) / (Canada) Pocket Dragon Adventures (1998–1999)
- 25 January - (United Kingdom) Yoho Ahoy (2000–2001)
- 12 July - (United States) The Brothers Flub (1999–2000)
- 13 July - (United States) / (Canada) Salty's Lighthouse (1997–1998)
- 14 July - (Canada) / (United States) Mega Babies (1999–2000)
- 1 November - (United Kingdom) Preston Pig (2000)
- 2 December - (United Kingdom) My Fragile Heart (2000)
- 4 December - (United Kingdom) Fetch the Vet (2000–2001)
- (Canada) / (United Kingdom) / (France) The Baskervilles (2000)
- (United Kingdom) The Magic Key (2000–2001)
- (Canada) / (France) Fly Tales (1999–2001)
- (United Kingdom) Sheeep (2000–2001)
- (Scotland) Meeow! (2000–2003)

== Television shows ==
=== 1950s ===
- Tagesschau (1952–present)

=== 1960s ===
- heute (1963–present)

=== 1970s ===
- heute-journal (1978–present)
- Tagesthemen (1978–present)

=== 1980s ===
- Wetten, dass..? (1981–2014)
- Lindenstraße (1985–present)

=== 1990s ===
- Gute Zeiten, schlechte Zeiten (1992–present)
- Marienhof (1992–2011)
- Unter uns (1994–present)
- Verbotene Liebe (1995–2015)
- Schloss Einstein (1998–present)
- In aller Freundschaft (1998–present)
- Wer wird Millionär? (1999–present)

== Networks and services ==
=== Launches ===
Network	Type	Launch date	Notes	Source
Welt	Cable television	24 January		
Goldstar TV	Cable television	1 March		
ZDFdokukanal	Cable television	1 April		

=== Conversions and rebrandings ===
Old network name	New network name	Type	Conversion Date	Notes	Source
Der Kinderkanal	KI.KA	Cable television	Unknown		

== Deaths ==
Date	Name	Age	Cinematic Credibility
26 December	Edith Grobleben	61	German TV announcer

== See also ==
- 2000 in Germany
