= Big Brother (German TV series) season 11 =

Big Brother
- Season 11
- Presented by: Aleksandra Bechtel; Sonja Zietlow (launch)
- No. of days: 134
- No. of housemates: 24
- Winner: Rayo di Sole (Marc Sonnen)
- Runner-up: Dagmar "Daggy" Szlachta
- No. of episodes: 153

Release
- Original network: RTL Zwei
- Original release: 2 May – 12 September 2011

Season chronology
- ← Previous; Season 10 Next → Season 12

Big Brother 2011, also known as Big Brother: The Secret, is the eleventh season of German reality series Big Brother. The season began on 2 May 2011 and was planned to end on 9 August 2011, lasting 100 days. However, the network announced that the season would be extended by 5 weeks. As a result, it lasted 135 days and ended on 12 September 2011. This season also use some of the game mechanics from the Secret Story franchise.

The launch show was hosted by Sonja Zietlow while the rest of the season was hosted by Aleksandra Bechtel, the presenter from seasons 2 to 4 and 10. Rayo di Sole was crowned the winner of the season and won €125,000.

== Format ==
Big Brother has chosen 30 hopefuls to move into the house. 14 housemates were chosen by Big Brother and the final housemate was picked by a public vote. Each housemate had a secret which one has to keep in the house, otherwise the housemate will automatically face eviction and the housemate who guessed it correctly will receive immunity from evictions and final ticket, but an incorrect guess will also result in facing eviction.

However, the housemate will only have the ticket as long as no other secret is disclosed. The ticket will be going over until a certain point in the series where the owner will have the ticket for good and be a finalist.

Furthermore, housemates will nominate every two weeks with the housemates with the most votes face eviction. They will participate in weekly tasks and matches for treats or to avoid punishments.

== Housemates ==
Name	Age on entry	Hometown	Occupation	Day entered	Day exited	Result
Marc "Rayo" Sonnen	27	Lochum	Author, wellness coach	1	134	Winner
Dagmara "Daggy" Szlachta	31	Hemer	Fitness trainer, bar owner	1	134	Runner-up
Heiko "Leon" Kuhrmann	34	Hamburg	Dancer	64	134	3rd Place
Cosimo Citiolo	29	Stuttgart	Musician	1	134	4th Place
Benny Kieckhäben	21	Worms	Singer	64	134	5th Place
Jaquelina Meys	20	Remscheid	Apprentice	71	127	Evicted
Ingrid Pavić	25	Munich	Hairdresser	1	120	Evicted
Steve Brauer	26	Gera	Physio therapist	1	113	Evicted
Florian Wess	26	Cologne	Event manager	23	106	Evicted
Benson Aksoy	34	Essen	Fitness coach	64	92	Evicted
Alex Nad	26	Waghäusel	Musician	64	80	Walked
Fabienne Hohlstein	28	Berlin	Fitness club manager	1	78	Walked
Tim "Timmy" Hohlstein	27	Berlin	Fitness club manager	1	78	Evicted
Lisa Bund	23	Hattersheim	Singer	1	71	Walked
Barry Hammerschmidt	21	Berlin	Unemployed	15	64	Evicted
Michelle "Jordan" Brüse	18	Freirachdorf	Unemployed	1	51	Walked
Jasmin Rapior	21	Bad Vilbel	Unemployed	1	50	Evicted
Valencia Vintage	21	Iphofen	Unemployed	1	41	Walked
David Ortega Arenas	25	Dortmund	Student	1	36	Evicted
René Kirsten	26	Leipzig	Sports salesman	1	34	Ejected
Hedia Quirhani	22	Siegen	Student	1	22	Evicted
Tim Tschirch	24	Kamen	Hairdresser	1	13	Walked

== Secrets ==
Name	Secret	Discovered by
Alex	"He hasn't had a mobile phone for 8 years"	Undiscovered
Barry	"He is a member of a Zulu-chief family"	Undiscovered
Benny	"He is the new Big Brother mole"	Rayo (Day 88)
Benson	"She owns 500 pairs of shoes"	Cosimo (Day 92)
Cosimo	"He is a philatelist"	Undiscovered
Daggy	"Her face was printed on 500,000 beer bottles"	Undiscovered
David	"He was bullied in school because he was overweight"	Undiscovered
Fabienne	"They are married" (with Timmy)	Daggy (Day 22)
Florian	"He works every Sunday together with disabled people"	Undiscovered
Hedia	"She is a virgin"	René (Day 13)
Ingrid	"She is afraid of the dark"	Cosimo (Day 59)
Jaquelina	"She is cross-eyed when stressed"	Undiscovered
Jasmin	"She is praying every night before she goes to bed"	Undiscovered
Jordan	"She is an arachnophobiac"	René (Day 32)
Leon	"He flew from East Germany as a kid"	Undiscovered
Lisa	"She has a compulsive-obsessive disorder and has to do everything three times"	Jasmin (Day 27)
Rayo	"He has moved in with his guardian angel"	Undiscovered
René	"He won the Mr. Saxony contest in 2005"	Undiscovered
Steve	"He is a Big Brother mole"	Big Brother/Himself (Day 26)
Tim	"He can speak with two different voices"	Hedia (Day 12)
Timmy	"They are married" (with Fabienne)	Daggy (Day 22)
Valencia	"She had to spend 3 days in prison as a teenager"	Ingrid (Day 19)

== Nominations Table ==
	Week 1	Week 3	Week 5	Week 7	Week 9	Week 11	Week 13	Week 15	Week 16	Week 17	Week 18	Week 19 Final		Nominations received
Rayo	Housemate	Jordan	Jordan	Timmy	Barry	Timmy	Benson	Florian	No nominations	Ingrid	Benny; Jaquelina	Winner (Day 134)		16
Daggy	Housemate	Rayo	Rayo	Rayo	Rayo	Alex	Benson	Leon	No nominations	Leon	Leon; Jaquelina	Runner-up (Day 134)		3
Leon	Not in House					Benny	Benson	Ingrid	No nominations	Ingrid	Daggy; Benny	Third place (Day 134)		12
Cosimo	Housemate	Fabienne	Jordan	Florian	Florian	Timmy	Jaquelina	Jaquelina	No nominations	Leon	Jaquelina; Leon	Fourth place (Day 134)		2
Benny	Not in House					Alex	Leon	Jaquelina	Nominated	Leon	Leon; Jaquelina	Fifth place (Day 134)		7
Jaquelina	Not in House						Benson	Florian	No nominations	Benny	Leon; Benny	Evicted (Day 127)		11
Ingrid	Housemate	Fabienne	David	Steve	Cosimo	Timmy	Leon	Leon	No nominations	Leon	Evicted (Day 120)			5
Steve	Housemate	Jordan	Jordan	Rayo	Ingrid	Benny	Jaquelina	Jaquelina	Nominated	Evicted (Day 113)				2
Florian	Not in House		David	Daggy	Barry	Timmy	Jaquelina	Daggy	Evicted (Day 106)					7
Benson	Not in House					Alex; Alex	Jaquelina	Evicted (Day 92)						4
Alex	Not in House					Benny	Walked (Day 80)							4
Fabienne	Housemate	Rayo	Rayo	Rayo	Rayo	Florian	Walked (Day 78)							6
Timmy	Housemate	Rayo	Rayo	Rayo	Ingrid	Florian	Evicted (Day 78)							5
Lisa	Housemate	Fabienne	David	Rayo	Barry	Walked (Day 71)								3
Barry	Non- Housemate	Evicted (Day 1)	Rayo	Florian	Lisa	Re-evicted (Day 64)								3
Jordan	Housemate	Fabienne	David	Lisa	Walked (Day 51)									6
Jasmin	Housemate	Fabienne	René	Cosimo	Evicted (Day 50)									0
Valencia	Housemate	Steve	David	Refused	Walked (Day 43)									0
David	Housemate	Fabienne	Jordan	Evicted (Day 36)										5
René	Housemate	Rayo	Rayo	Ejected (Day 34)										1
Hedia	Housemate	Lisa	Evicted (Day 22)											0
Tim	Non- Housemate	Walked (Day 13)												0
Katharina	Non- Housemate	Evicted (Day 1)												0
Sebastian	Non- Housemate	Evicted (Day 1)												0
Notes														
Against public vote	Barry; Katarina; Sebastian; Tim	Fabienne; Hedia; Jasmin; Rayo; Timmy; Valencia	David; Fabienne; Lisa; Rayo; Steve; Timmy; Valencia	Florian; Jasmin; Jordan; Rayo	Barry; Ingrid; Rayo	Alex; Ingrid; Timmy	Benson; Ingrid; Jaquelina	Benny; Florian; Jaquelina; Leon	Benny; Steve	Ingrid; Leon	Benny; Jaquelina; ~~Leon~~	Benny; Cosimo; Daggy; Leon; Rayo		
Walked	none	Tim	Jordan	Valencia	Jordan	Lisa	Fabienne, Alex, Florian	Benny	none					
Ejected	none		René	none										
Evicted	Barry; 31% to enter	Hedia; 89% to evict	David; 41% to evict	Jasmin; 51% to evict	Barry; 66% to evict	Timmy; 73% to evict	Benson; 83% to evict	Florian; 71% to evict	Steve; 75% to evict	Ingrid; 69% to evict	Jaquelina; 59% to evict	Benny; 6.2% (out of 5)	Cosimo; 18.5% (out of 4)	
Evicted	Katharina; 14% to enter	Hedia; 89% to evict	David; 41% to evict	Jasmin; 51% to evict	Barry; 66% to evict	Timmy; 73% to evict	Benson; 83% to evict	Florian; 71% to evict	Steve; 75% to evict	Ingrid; 69% to evict	Jaquelina; 59% to evict	Leon; 22.5% (out of 3)	Daggy; 46.1% (out of 2)	
Evicted	Sebastian; 11% to enter	Hedia; 89% to evict	David; 41% to evict	Jasmin; 51% to evict	Barry; 66% to evict	Timmy; 73% to evict	Benson; 83% to evict	Florian; 71% to evict	Steve; 75% to evict	Ingrid; 69% to evict	Jaquelina; 59% to evict	Rayo; 53.9% to win		

=== Notes ===
- ^1 As Tim incorrectly guessed David's secret, Timmy incorrectly guessed Daggy's secret, Valencia incorrectly guessed Jordan's secret, Jasmin incorrectly guessed Timmy's secret, and Hedia's secret was discovered by Rene, all five are automatically up for eviction.
- ^2 Tim was planned to be nominated, because of Hedia's correct guessing about his secret, but he left before the nomination started. Valencia was nominated because Ingrid correctly guessed her secret. Fabienne & Timmy were nominated because Daggy correctly guessed their secret. Steve was automatically nominated as a punishment because he revealed his secret to René & Timmy which he wasn't allowed to do. Jasmin correctly guessed Lisa's secret, therefore Lisa is automatically nominated.
- ^3 Jordan was planned to be nominated, because of René's correct guessing about her secret, but she left before the nomination started. Due to her re-entrance, the nomination remains in effect. Valencia was nominated because she incorrectly guessed Jasmin's secret and likewise Jasmin, who incorrectly guessed Barry's secret. Valencia was planned to be nominated but she left the house after nominations.
- ^4 Ingrid was nominated because Cosimo correctly guessed her secret.
- ^5 Only male housemates can be nominated.
- ^6 Because of her win in a live match, Benson's nomination counted double.
- ^7 Ingrid was nominated because she incorrectly guessed Alex's secret.
- ^8 Benson was planned to be nominated, because of Cosimo's correct guessing about her secret, but she got evicted before the nomination started.
- ^9^10 Benny was nominated because Rayo correctly guessed his secret. As he revealed his secret beforehand, he is nominated for the next two evictions.
- ^11 Jaquelina go the "Key of Temptation" which gave her immunity and the ability to nominate one person for eviction. She nominated Steve.
