= Big Brother (German TV series) season 14 =

Big Brother
- Season 14
- Presented by: Jochen Schropp
- No. of days: 99
- No. of housemates: 20
- Winner: Marcus Bräuer
- Runner-up: Frauke Drathschmidt
- No. of episodes: 85

Release
- Original network: Joyn (all shows and live feed); Sat.1 (weekly live shows)
- Original release: 4 March – 10 June 2024

Season chronology
- ← Previous; Season 13 Next → Season 15

Big Brother 2024, also known as Big Brother 14, is the fourteenth season of the German reality television series Big Brother. The show returned after a four-year hiatus and begins airing on 4 March 2024 on Sat.1 and Joyn and will end after 100 days on 10 June 2024. It is the first regular season of Big Brother to be predominantly aired on a streaming platform in Germany and Sat.1 will only air the weekly live shows. Marcus Bräuer from Berlin was announced the winner of the show after 99 days and won the 100.000 € cashprize.

== Production ==
=== Presenters ===
On 6 February 2024 it was announced that Jochen Schropp will be presenting the weekly live shows who he has already been hosting the celebrity version since 2014.

=== Broadcasting ===
Monday	Tuesday	Wednesday	Thursday	Friday	Saturday	Sunday
Live Launch (8:15 pm – 10:15 pm); Weekly Live Shows (10:55 pm – 11:55 pm)	Highlights Shows (9:00 pm – 9:35 pm)					

=== Live feed ===
In contrary to season 13, a live feed will be re-introduced.

=== Eye logo ===
On 1 March 2024, Joyn released the new eye logo, which is a variation of the former eye. A multi-colored ring, representing each housemate, replaces the green ring formerly used.

=== Theme song ===
The theme song of the show's intro and outro is "Leb!", the original theme song from season 1.

=== House ===
The official pictures of the new Big Brother house were released on 1 March 2024. It will mostly feature the same furniture previously used on season 11 of Promi Big Brother.

== Housemates ==
Name	Age on entry	Hometown	Occupation	Day entered	Day exited	Result
Marcus Bräuer	36	Berlin	Illustrator	1	99	Winner
Frauke Drathschmidt	29	Berlin	Senior HR specialist	1	99	Runner-up
Benedikt Kohle	23	Ehningen	Student	1	99	3rd Place
Christian Kugathasan	26	Essen	Attic cleaner	1	99	4th Place
Mateo Greco	46	Wuppertal	Painter	1	99	5th Place
Maja Gerlach	25	Düsseldorf	Gastronomer	1	99	6th Place
Nicos Große	27	Rochlitz	Mailman	1	92	Evicted
Luanna Ferr	30	Hamburg	Office worker	50	88	Evicted
Bertha Frieberg	37	Greifswald	Teacher	50	85	Evicted
Simon "Mafi" Tulgar	30	Göppingen	Service worker	50	71	Evicted
Tanja Steidel	55	Giesen	Nail studio owner	1	60	Walked
Kevin Kwame Boakye	29	Bochum	Sales assistant	1	57	Evicted
Yael Neander	29	Berlin	Hair and make-up artist	1	43	Evicted
Angela Anan	49	Bremen	Medium	1	40	Ejected
Maxime Ocasek	20	Wulkenzin	Wakeboarder	1	30	Walked
Gema Requierme-Ebelhäuser	55	Koblenz	Retail saleswoman	1	29	Evicted
Moritz Pollak Coelho	23	Gerabronn	IT consultant	1	24	Walked
Sandro Mühlbauer	32	Stralsund	Driving instructor	1	24	Walked
Ciara Singh	35	Wallisellen, Switzerland	Nurse	1	15	Evicted
Jacqueline Rudloff	35	Bochum	Unemployed	1	8	Evicted

== Twists ==
=== Container Chef ===
Each week, the housemates will select a Container Chef, who will make important decisions throughout the week and is responsible for the daily life in the house.

=== Weekly tasks ===
Each week, Big Brother will set the housemates a weekly task. If successful, housemates will have a shopping budget of €4 per person per day. If not, they will have a budget of €2 per person per day.

=== Shopping temptation ===
Each week, one person will be designated to do the shopping list for the housemates in the diary room. But Big Brother will tempt the housemates with different treats which will reduce the shopping budget.

== Nominations table ==
	Week 1	Week 2	Week 4	Week 6	Week 8	Week 10	Week 12	Week 13		Week 14 Final		Nominations received
	Week 1	Week 2	Week 4	Week 6	Week 8	Week 10	Week 12	Day 88	Day 92	Week 14 Final		Nominations received
Marcus	Not eligible	Ciara	No; Nominations	Not eligible	Not eligible	Simon	Not eligible	Luanna	Maja	Winner (Day 99)		4
Frauke	Angela; Sandro	Angela	No; Nominations	Not eligible	Christian	Luanna	Not eligible	Luanna	Nicos	Runner-up (Day 99)		9
Benedikt	Not eligible	Kevin	No; Nominations	Frauke; Marcus; Nicos; Yael	Not eligible	Luanna	Not eligible	Luanna	Nicos	Third place (Day 99)		4
Christian	Not eligible	Gema	No; Nominations	Not eligible	Not eligible	Frauke	Frauke	Luanna	Frauke	Fourth place (Day 99)		1
Mateo	Jacqueline	Maxime	No; Nominations	Not eligible	Not eligible	Benedikt	Bertha	Benedikt	Benedikt	Fifth place (Day 99)		1
Maja	Nicos	Maxime	No; Nominations	Not eligible	Marcus	Luanna	Not eligible	Luanna	Nicos	Sixth place (Day 99)		1
Nicos	Sandro	Moritz	No; Nominations	Not eligible	Not eligible	Frauke	Not eligible	Frauke	Frauke	Evicted (Day 92)		5
Luanna	Not in House					Mateo	Benedikt	Frauke	Evicted (Day 88)			8
Bertha	Not in House					Simon (2x)	Marcus	Evicted (Day 85)				1
Simon	Not in House					Marcus	Evicted (Day 71)					3
Tanja	Not eligible	Angela	No; Nominations	Not eligible	Kevin	Walked (Day 60)						0
Kevin	Yael; Sandro	Sandro	No; Nominations	Frauke; Marcus; Nicos; Yael	Not eligible	Evicted (Day 57)						3
Yael	Sandro	Kevin	No; Nominations	Not eligible	Evicted (Day 43)							3
Angela	Frauke; Sandro	Sandro	No; Nominations	Not eligible	Ejected (Day 40)							2
Maxime	Not eligible	Yael	No; Nominations	Walked (Day 30)								1
Gema	Not eligible	Moritz	No; Nominations	Evicted (Day 29)								1
Moritz	Not eligible	Yael	No; Nominations	Walked (Day 24)								1
Sandro	Kevin	Ciara	No; Nominations	Walked (Day 24)								7
Ciara	Frauke	Gema	Evicted (Day 15)									1
Jacqueline	Sandro	Evicted (Day 8)										1
Notes	1	2	3	4	none		5	6	none			
Against public vote	Angela, Frauke, Jacqueline, Kevin, Nicos, Sandro, Yael	Angela, Ciara, Gema, Kevin, Maxime, Moritz; Sandro, Yael	Gema, Maxime, ~~Moritz,~~; ~~Sandro~~	Frauke, ~~Marcus~~, Nicos, Yael	Christian, Kevin, ~~Marcus~~	Frauke, Luanna, Simon	Benedikt, Bertha, ~~Frauke~~, ~~Marcus~~	Frauke, Luanna	Frauke, Marcus, Nicos	Benedikt, Christian, Frauke, Maja, Marcus, Mateo		
Walked	none		Moritz, Sandro	Maxime	none	Tanja	none					
Ejected	none			Angela	none							
Evicted	Jacqueline; Fewest votes to save	Ciara; Fewest votes (out of 3) to save	Gema; Fewest votes to save	Yael; Fewest votes to save	Kevin; Fewest votes to save	Simon; Fewest votes to save	Bertha; Fewest votes to save	Luanna; Fewest votes to save	Nicos; Fewest votes to save	Maja; Fewest votes to win	Mateo; Fewest votes to win	
Evicted	Jacqueline; Fewest votes to save	Ciara; Fewest votes (out of 3) to save	Gema; Fewest votes to save	Yael; Fewest votes to save	Kevin; Fewest votes to save	Simon; Fewest votes to save	Bertha; Fewest votes to save	Luanna; Fewest votes to save	Nicos; Fewest votes to save	Christian; Fewest votes to win	Benedikt; Fewest votes to win	
Evicted	Jacqueline; Fewest votes to save	Ciara; Fewest votes (out of 3) to save	Gema; Fewest votes to save	Yael; Fewest votes to save	Kevin; Fewest votes to save	Simon; Fewest votes to save	Bertha; Fewest votes to save	Luanna; Fewest votes to save	Nicos; Fewest votes to save	Frauke; 49.46% to win	Marcus; 50.54% to win	

=== Notes ===
- ^Note 1: On Day 1, Mateo chose to use immunity on himself. The nominations were handed out after different events where one or two persons decided another housemates.
- ^Note 2: All housemates were divided in pairs and each pair had to decide on one nominations.
- ^Note 3: Instead of nominations immunity was handed out. Mateo won a match and then started a line. He chose to save Kevin, Kevin chose Christian, Christian chose Nicos, Nicos chose Yael, Yael chose Angela, Angela chose Benedikt, Benedikt chose Maya, Maya chose Frauke and Frauke chose Marcus. The public than voted to save Tanja, leaving the last 4 up for eviction.
- ^Note 4: Kevin found the golden egg and decided that he can live without Benedikt in the house. He moved to another room where Kevin joined him. Later that day both decided on four housemates to face eviction. Kevin than chose to not use his earlier decision to nominate Benedikt. The public decided to save one of the four nominated housemates and chose Marcus.
- ^Note 5: Mateo won a game marathon and either won 7,000€ or a mystery box. He chose the box which contained a ticket for the final and immunity until then. Marcus won a match for immunity and Frauke was later saved by the public.
- ^Note 6: After Bertha's eviction all housemates faced a face to face nominations. The eviction took place on Day 88 and not as normal on a Monday live show.
