= Big Brother (German TV series) season 15 =

Big Brother
- Season 15
- Presented by: Jochen Schropp; Elena Gruschka; Jochen Bendel; Melissa Khalaj
- No. of days: 50
- No. of housemates: 18
- Winner: Marcel Schiefelbein
- Runner-up: Tanja Steidel

Release
- Original network: Joyn (highlights shows and live feed); Sat.1 (launch night) sixx (daily spin-off show)
- Original release: 24 February – 14 April 2025

Season chronology
- ← Previous; Season 14

Big Brother 2025, also known as Big Brother 15, is the fifteenth season of the German reality television series Big Brother. The show began airing on 24 February 2025 with a live launch on Sat.1 and Joyn and will end after 50 days on 14 April 2025. It is the second regular season of Big Brother to be predominantly aired on a streaming platform in Germany and sixx will air daily live spin-off shows from Monday-Friday. Marcel Schiefelbein was announced the winner in his third participation of Big Brother in the final and won the 50.000€ cash prize after he became the Runner-up in Big Brother 8 & 9. It's also the third time, that a "Non Day 1 housemate" has won Big Brother.

== Production ==
=== Presenters ===
On 3 February 2025 it was announced that Jochen Schropp, Elena Gruschka, Melissa Khalaj & Jochen Bendel will be presenting "Big Brother - Die Show" on sixx.

=== Broadcasting ===
| Monday | Tuesday | Wednesday | Thursday | Friday | Saturday | Sunday |
|---|---|---|---|---|---|---|
| Live Launch (11:15 pm – 12:30 am) | Highlights shows (7:00 pm – 7:30 pm); Big Brother - Die Show (7:15 pm – 8:15 pm) | | | | no shows | |
| Highlights shows (7:00 pm – 7:30 pm); Big Brother - Die Show (7:15 pm – 8:15 pm) | Highlights shows (7:00 pm – 7:30 pm); Big Brother - Die Show (7:15 pm – 8:15 pm) | | | | no shows | |

=== Live feed ===
As in season 14, a live-feed will accompany the daily shows.

=== Eye logo ===
On 9 January 2025, Joyn released the new eye logo, which is a variation of the previous year's eye. A multi-colored ring, representing each housemate, replaces the green ring formerly used.

=== Theme song ===
The theme song of the show's intro and outro is "Leb!", the original theme song from season 1.

=== House ===
The official pictures of the new Big Brother house were released on 21 February 2025. It will mostly feature the same furniture previously used on season 12 of Promi Big Brother.

== Housemates ==
| Name | Age on entry | Hometown | Occupation | Day entered | Day exited | Result |
|---|---|---|---|---|---|---|
| Marcel Schiefelbein | 40 | Köthen | Geriatric nurse | 10 | 50 | Winner |
| Tanja Steidel | 56 | Giesen | Nail Studio owner | 26 | 50 | Runner-up |
| Tino Wachtel | 31 | Rügen | Farmer | 1 | 50 | 3rd Place |
| Stefan Inthal | 23 | Innsbruck, Austria | Footballer | 1 | 50 | 4th Place |
| Saskia Simmert | 41 | Nienburg | Telephone operator & naildesigner | 24 | 50 | 5th Place |
| Dino Zrilić | 27 | Eschweiler | Nurse | 1 | 50 | 6th Place |
| Ulrike Itgensoy | 41 | Dortmund | Hairdresser | 1 | 47 | Evicted |
| Iris Gonska | 27 | Berlin | Singer | 1 | 45 | Evicted |
| Julia Oemler | 30 | Leipzig | Alternative practitioner | 4 | 43 | Evicted |
| Nadiem Bahiat | 30 | Bochum | Content creator | 1 | 40 | Evicted |
| Ulf Franz | 60 | Dormagen | DJ | 10 | 38 | Evicted |
| Andriana Anagnostaki | 21 | Offenbach am Main | Marketing student | 1 | 36 | Evicted |
| Corinna Frank | 35 | Vienna, Austria | Erotic content creator | 17 | 29 | Evicted |
| Mariama Bah | 23 | Bielefeld | Nurse | 1 | 22 | Evicted |
| Marvin Opana | 28 | Berlin | Model | 8 | 16 | Evicted |
| Florentina Shamolli | 27 | Vienna, Austria | Clerk | 1 | 15 | Evicted |
| Aurelia Ziva | 28 | Ulm | Sales worker | 1 | 8 | Evicted |
| Mika Akalin | 23 | Gladbeck | Tractor driver | 1 | 3 | Evicted |

=== Notes ===
- ^Note 1: Marvin was supposed to enter the house on Day 1, but due to illness, his entrance was delayed.

== Nominations table ==
| | Week 1 | | Week 2 | Week 3 | | Week 4 | Week 5 | Week 6 | | | Week 7 | | | | Nominations received |
| | Day 1 | Day 4 | Week 2 | Day 15 | Day 17 | Week 4 | Week 5 | Day 36 | Day 38 | Day 40 | Day 43 | Day 46 | Final | | Nominations received |
|---|---|---|---|---|---|---|---|---|---|---|---|---|---|---|---|
| Marcel | Not in House | | Not eligible | No nominations | Ulf | Iris | No nominations | Not eligible | No nominations | Saskia | Saskia | Saskia | Winner (Day 50) | | 1 |
| Tanja | Not in House | | | | | | No nominations | Not eligible | No nominations | Julia | Tino | Tino | Runner-up (Day 50) | | 3 |
| Tino | 8th | Mariama | Not eligible | No nominations | Julia | Not eligible | No nominations | Not eligible | No nominations | Tanja | Tanja | Tanja | Third place (Day 50) | | 5 |
| Stefan | 7th | Aurelia | Iris | No nominations | Iris | Not eligible | No nominations | Ulf; Nadiem | No nominations | Iris | Iris | Ulrike | Fourth place (Day 50) | | 7 |
| Saskia | Not in House | | | | | Exempt | No nominations | Not eligible | No nominations | Julia | Iris | Ulrike | Fifth place (Day 50) | | 8 |
| Dino | 11th | Iris | Not eligible | No nominations | Iris | Not eligible | No nominations | Not eligible | No nominations | Julia | Saskia | Saskia | Sixth place (Day 50) | | 0 |
| Ulrike | 6th | Aurelia | Marvin | No nominations | Mariama | Not eligible | No nominations | Not eligible | No nominations | Stefan | Stefan | Stefan | Evicted (Day 47) | | 2 |
| Iris | 2nd | Stefan | Not eligible | No nominations | Stefan | Corinna | No nominations | Not eligible | No nominations | Saskia | Saskia | Evicted (Day 45) | | | 8 |
| Julia | Not in House | Aurelia | Marvin | No nominations | Nadiem | Not eligible | No nominations | Not eligible | No nominations | Saskia | Evicted (Day 43) | | | | 5 |
| Nadiem | 4th | Aurelia | Marvin | No nominations | Julia | Not eligible | No nominations | Not eligible | No nominations | Evicted (Day 40) | | | | | 3 |
| Ulf | Not in House | | Not eligible | No nominations | Stefan | Marcel | No nominations | Not eligible | Evicted (Day 38) | | | | | | 3 |
| Andriana | 5th | Tino | Not eligible | No nominations | Mariama | Not eligible | No nominations | Evicted (Day 36) | | | | | | | 1 |
| Corinna | Not in House | | | | Nadiem | Not eligible | Evicted (Day 29) | | | | | | | | 1 |
| Mariama | 3rd | Tino | Andriana | No nominations | Ulf | Evicted (Day 22) | | | | | | | | | 4 |
| Marvin | Not in House | | Not eligible | No nominations | Evicted (Day 16) | | | | | | | | | | 3 |
| Florentina | 1st | Tino | Not eligible | Evicted (Day 15) | | | | | | | | | | | 0 |
| Aurelia | 9th | Mariama | Evicted (Day 8) | | | | | | | | | | | | 4 |
| Mika | 10th | Evicted (Day 3) | | | | | | | | | | | | | N/A |
| Notes | 1 | 2 | | | | | | | | | | | | | |
| Against public vote | Aurelia, Dino, Mika | Aurelia, Stefan, Tino | Andriana, Florentina, Iris, Marcel, ~~Marvin,~~; Ulf | All housemates | Iris, Julia, Mariama, Nadiem, Stefan, ~~Ulf~~ | Corinna, Iris, Marcel, Ulf | Andriana, Dino, ~~Nadiem,~~; Saskia, ~~Tino,~~; ~~Ulrike~~ | Nadiem, Stefan, Ulf | Dino, Nadiem, ~~Saskia,~~; Stefan, Tino | Julia, Saskia | Iris, Saskia | Saskia, Stefan, Ulrike | Dino, Marcel, Saskia, Stefan; Tanja, Tino | | |
| Evicted | Mika; Fewest votes to save | Aurelia; Fewest votes to save | Florentina; Fewest votes to save | Marvin; Fewest votes to save | Mariama; Fewest votes to save | Corinna; Fewest votes to save | Andriana; Fewest votes to save | Ulf; Fewest votes to save | Nadiem; Fewest votes to save | Julia; Fewest votes to save | Iris; Fewest votes to save | Ulrike; Fewest votes to save | Dino; Fewest votes to win | Saskia; Fewest votes to win | |
| Evicted | Mika; Fewest votes to save | Aurelia; Fewest votes to save | Florentina; Fewest votes to save | Marvin; Fewest votes to save | Mariama; Fewest votes to save | Corinna; Fewest votes to save | Andriana; Fewest votes to save | Ulf; Fewest votes to save | Nadiem; Fewest votes to save | Julia; Fewest votes to save | Iris; Fewest votes to save | Ulrike; Fewest votes to save | Stefan; Fewest votes to win | Tino; Fewest votes to win | |
| Evicted | Mika; Fewest votes to save | Aurelia; Fewest votes to save | Florentina; Fewest votes to save | Marvin; Fewest votes to save | Mariama; Fewest votes to save | Corinna; Fewest votes to save | Andriana; Fewest votes to save | Ulf; Fewest votes to save | Nadiem; Fewest votes to save | Julia; Fewest votes to save | Iris; Fewest votes to save | Ulrike; Fewest votes to save | Tanja; Fewest votes to win | Marcel; Most votes to win | |

=== Notes ===
- ^Note 1: Shortly after entering the house, Big Brother asked the housemates to rank themselves who'd be most likely to win Big Brother. After ranking themselves, Big Brother revealed that the 3 lowest ranked housemates would face eviction.
- ^Note 2: Andriana, Dino, Florentina, Nadiem, and Ulrike won the "Aufgabe der Woche" and were immune from eviction.
