= Big Brother (German TV series) season 8 =

Big Brother
- Season 8
- Presented by: Charlotte Karlinder; Miriam Pielhau
- No. of days: 183
- No. of housemates: 25
- Winner: Silke "Isi" Kaufmann
- Runner-up: Marcel Schiefelbein
- No. of episodes: 183

Release
- Original network: RTL Zwei
- Original release: 7 January – 7 July 2008

Season chronology
- ← Previous; Season 7 Next → Season 9

The eighth season of Big Brother Germany lasted exactly half a year from 7 January 2008 to 7 July 2008 and was shown on RTL II. Wherein a daily show the previous day's events were summarized. In a weekly live show, hosted by Charlotte Karlinder, Miriam Pielhau and Jürgen Milski, nominations and evictions were held. Usually, the housemates nominated each other with the viewers voting for eviction of a nominee (by phone). Additionally, the 24-hour live TV channel was brought back and was again offered by Premiere for 15 € a month.

== Summary ==
For the first time since Big Brother: The Battle, the house was divided into two areas: rich and poor. The rich area, holding 6 housemates, was luxurious with comfortable furniture, a wide range of food and beverages, sufficient cigarette supplies and alcoholic drinks (beer, wine, champagne). The poor area, also inhabited by 6 housemates, on the other hand, was equipped like a canteen kitchen. The food supplies were rather poor with limited cigarette supplies and usually no alcoholic beverages. Both areas were separated by a small wall, which wasn't allowed to be crossed and over which no "smuggling" was allowed. A spiral staircase, used by both teams, lead to the upper floor which held the bedrooms. While the rich area's bedroom had luxurious double beds, the poor team's bedroom contained an operating-table-like structure, on which the housemates slept in sleeping bags.

From time to time (usually during the weekly live show) there were matches in which both teams competed against each other, resulting in the winning team changing into or continuing to live in the rich area. In additional matches teams could compete for rewards (e.g. a large plate with burgers and fries, being able to play Wii in a separated room, etc.).

The winner was Silke "Isi" Kaufmann who won 250,000 €. The season's theme song was "Choose to be me" by Sunrise Avenue.

== Housemates ==
Name	Age on entry	Hometown	Occupation	Day entered	Day exited	Result
Silke "Isi" Kaufmann	26	Mülheim	Pole dancer	1	183	Winner
Marcel Schiefelbein	23	Köthen	Chef	8	183	Runner-up
Kevin Daßler	26	St. Augustin	Shop assistant	1	183	3rd Place
Tanja Höfer	21	Tönisvorst	Student	78	183	4th Place
Mandy Fleck	20	Wedderstedt	Beautician	92	183	5th Place
Gianfranco "Franco" Cielo	31	Göppingen	Electrician	85	176	Evicted
Alex Stark	32	Poing	Promoter	1	162	Evicted
Steffi Rosengart	25	Ziemetshausen		85	148	Evicted
Caro Podleschka	19	Korschenbroich	Student	36	134	Evicted
Nora	48	Berlin	Psychologist	85	120	Evicted
Hassan Nejme	23	Hilchenbach	Construction mechanic	1	115	Walked
Serafino Pulsone	30	Berlin	Hair stylist	64	106	Evicted
Mari Eckhardt	35	Rudersberg		85	99	Ejected
Marcel Schmidt	24	Bebra	Pizza boy	59	92	Evicted
Nadine Sommerfeld	25	Köthen	Dentist's assistant	3	79	Walked
Jenny Schindler	22	Dortmund	Student	50	78	Evicted
Patrick Neumann	34	Ramsdorf	Promoter	29	76	Walked
Rebecca Stawitzky	25	Wiesbaden	Waitress	1	68	Ejected
Melly Wittmann	19	Berlin	Waitress	1	64	Evicted
Manuel Schmidt	24	Bebra	Student	50	53	Walked
Neila Gargouri	24	Hannover		22	50	Evicted
Ann-Kathrin "Anki" Torringen	24	Hamburg	Student	5	36	Evicted
Dirk	39			22	34	Walked
Bianca Murken	34	Berlin	Teacher	1	22	Evicted
Adrian Rohrmüller	28	Landshut	Bouncer	1	8	Ejected

== Nominations table ==
	Week 2	Week 3	Week 5	Week 7	Week 9	Week 11	Week 13	Week 15	Week 17	Week 19	Week 21	Week 23	Week 25	Week 26 Final	
Isi	Rebecca	Bianca	Anki	Neila	Hassan	Jenny	Marcel S.	Hassan; Serafino	Tanja	Alex	Steffi	Franco	Franco	Winner (Day 183)	
Marcel	Not in House	Rebecca	Rebecca	Rebecca	Rebecca	Isi	Alex	Isi; Serafino	Isi	Isi	Steffi	Franco	Marcel	Runner-Up (Day 183)	
Kevin	Melly	Bianca	Rebecca	Rebecca	Rebecca	Nadine	Alex	Isi; Serafino	Steffi	Steffi	Steffi	Franco	Kevin	Third Place (Day 183)	
Tanja	Not in House						Alex	Alex; Serafino	Nora	Caro	Franco	Alex	Franco	Fourth Place (Day 183)	
Mandy	Not in House							Isi; Serafino	Steffi	Caro	Steffi	Alex	Mandy	Fifth Place (Day 183)	
Franco	Not in House							Kevin; Serafino	Nora	Alex	Tanja	Alex	Kevin	Evicted (Day 176)	
Alex	Rebecca	Rebecca	Rebecca	Isi	Melly	Nadine	Kevin	Isi; Serafino	Tanja	Franco	Tanja	Franco	Evicted (Day 162)		
Steffi	Not in House							Hassan; Franco	Nora	Not; Eligible	Kevin	Evicted (Day 148)			
Caro	Not in House			Nadine	Melly	Nadine	Alex	Isi; Tanja	Tanja	Alex	Evicted (Day 134)				
Nora	Not in House							Isi; Franco	Tanja	Evicted (Day 120)					
Hassan	Melly	Bianca	Anki	Isi	Isi	Jenny	Alex	Isi; Nora	Nora	Walked (Day 115)					
Serafino	Not in House					Isi	Hassan	Alex; Franco	Evicted (Day 106)						
Mari	Not in House							Ejected (Day 99)							
Marcel S.	Not in House					Nadine	Isi	Evicted (Day 92)							
Nadine	Rebecca	Bianca	Anki	Rebecca	Caro	Jenny	Walked (Day 79)								
Jenny	Not in House				Melly	Nadine	Evicted (Day 78)								
Patrick	Not in House			Neila	Kevin	Jenny	Walked (Day 76)								
Rebecca	Melly	Kevin	Kevin	Nadine	Melly	Ejected (Day 68)									
Melly	Rebecca	Rebecca	Anki	Rebecca	Rebecca	Evicted (Day 64)									
Manuel	Not in House				Walked (Day 53)										
Neila	Not in House		Melly	Melly	Evicted (Day 50)										
Anki	Melly	Kevin	Melly	Evicted (Day 36)											
Dirk	Not in House		Kevin	Walked (Day 34)											
Bianca	Rebecca	Nadine	Evicted (Day 22)												
Adrian	Ejected (Day 8)														
Notes	1	2	3	4	5	6	7	8	9	10	11	12	13	14	
Nominated For Eviction	Melly, Rebecca	Bianca, Rebecca	Anki, Rebecca	Isi, Nadine, Neila	Melly, Patrick	Isi, Jenny	Hassan, Isi, Marcel S.	Alex, Serafino	Isi, Nora, Tanja	Alex, Caro	Steffi, Tanja	Alex, Franco, Marcel	Franco, Kevin, Tanja	Isi, Kevin, Mandy, Marcel, Tanja	
Walked	none		Dirk	none	Manuel	Patrick	Nadine	none	Hassan	none					
Ejected	Adrian	none				Rebecca	none	Mari	none						
Evicted	Rebecca; 5 of 9 votes to fake evict	Bianca; 90.8% to evict	Anki; 90.6% to evict	Neila; 67.2% to evict	Melly; 73.3% to evict	Jenny; 69.5% to evict	Marcel S. 60.5% to evict	Serafino; 81.5% to evict	Nora; 81.3% to evict	Caro; 71.5% to evict	Steffi; 66.8% to evict	Alex; 73.3% to evict	Franco; 74.4% to evict	Mandy; 2.4% (out of 5)	Tanja; 4.9% (out of 5)
Evicted	Rebecca; 5 of 9 votes to fake evict	Bianca; 90.8% to evict	Anki; 90.6% to evict	Neila; 67.2% to evict	Melly; 73.3% to evict	Jenny; 69.5% to evict	Marcel S. 60.5% to evict	Serafino; 81.5% to evict	Nora; 81.3% to evict	Caro; 71.5% to evict	Steffi; 66.8% to evict	Alex; 73.3% to evict	Franco; 74.4% to evict	Kevin; 10.1% (out of 3)	Marcel; 45.4% (out of 2)
Evicted	Melly; 4 of 9 votes to fake evict	Bianca; 90.8% to evict	Anki; 90.6% to evict	Neila; 67.2% to evict	Melly; 73.3% to evict	Jenny; 69.5% to evict	Marcel S. 60.5% to evict	Serafino; 81.5% to evict	Nora; 81.3% to evict	Caro; 71.5% to evict	Steffi; 66.8% to evict	Alex; 73.3% to evict	Franco; 74.4% to evict	Isi; 54.6% to win	

=== Notes ===
- ^1 As new housemates Anki and Nadine were immune - they could nominate but not be nominated. The housemates were voting for who they wanted to evict and the two housemates with the most votes were fake evicted. They returned to the house the following day.
- ^2 The public voted for which team (the Rich team or the Poor team) they wanted to be immune from nomination. They chose the Poor Team and hence Alex, Anki, Isi, Marcel and Melly are safe from nomination this week. When voting the public can vote to save a housemate, or to evict a housemate. The evictee is decided by the housemate who has, of their total, the highest percentage of evict votes. For example, this week, of all the votes cast to save/evict her 90.8% of Bianca's votes were to evict her. Whereas only 47.0% of Rebecca's votes were to evict her. Therefore, with the higher percentage of evict votes, Bianca was evicted.
- ^3 This week the public were allowed to nominate for 2 points. They chose Nadine to nominate, although this had no effect. As new housemate Neila was immune.
- ^4 Caro, as a new housemate, was immune this week. The public also selected Rebecca to be immune. Had she not been chosen for immunity, Rebecca would have faced the public vote this week.
- ^5 This week housemates (apart from Jenny who, as a new housemate, is immune) grouped together into pairs of Alex & Caro, Hassan & Nadine, Isi & Rebecca, Kevin & Marcel and Melly & Patrick. They nominated individually, but each individual nomination for them also counted as a nomination for their partner. After nominations Isi & Rebecca and Melly & Patrick both had the most nominations with 4 each and, with 79.1% of the Vote, Melly and Patrick were chosen to face the public vote this week.
- ^6 Marcel S. and Serafino were immune as new housemates. Nadine was also chosen by the public to be immune - if she had not been immune she would have faced the public vote.
- ^7 This week it was the housemate with the most nominations who would get to choose the three nominees. Tanja was immune as a new housemate, and Serafino was also chosen for immunity by the public. Alex received the most nomination points with 5 and was hence immune and in charge of choosing the three nominees. He selected Hassan, Isi and Marcel S.
- ^8 Mandy was immune as a new housemate and Isi won immunity in a public vote. This week, the housemates made 2 nominations, the first nomination was for an "old housemate" (shown in the top of the nomination box) and the second nomination was for a "new housemate". A new housemates is considered as any that entered on or after Day 64 (Franco, Mandy, Nora, Serafino, Steffi and Tanja). Serafino received the most votes for the new housemates and faced the public vote. Out of the old housemates Isi received the most votes, but had already been chosen for immunity. Alex and Hassan were next, and the public chose Alex to face the public vote alongside Serafino.
- ^9 This week the one housemate with the most nominations would be up for eviction. That housemate then has to choose another two housemates (one old and one new) to be also up for eviction. As both Nora and Tanja received the most nominations with 4 each, the public decided which should be the first nominee and chose Nora, who then selected Isi and Tanja to join her as nominees.
- ^10 This week it was the housemate's mothers who nominated on the housemate's behalf. Steffi's mother declined to take part and therefore forfeited Steffi's nomination. Marcel was immune after being chosen by the public.
- ^11 The public chose Marcel to be immune this week.
- ^12 All female housemates were immune this week. The public decided that Marcel should automatically face the public vote as punishment for rule breaking and Marcel was hence automatically nominated alongside the two nominees.
- ^13 In the final round of nominations housemates were allowed to nominate themselves. Isi was awarded immunity by the public.
- ^14 For the final week, the public was voted for who they wanted to win.

== Guests ==
Name	Entry	Exit	Note
Samu Haber	25 February	25 February	lead singer of Sunrise Avenue
Olivia Jones	3 March	3 March	popular transvestite
Bärbel	8 May	10 May	Marcel's grandmother
Sina	27 May	27 May	date for Marcel
Ginny & Giuseppe	9 June	9 June	season 6 housemates
Bettina "Betty"	10 June	11 June	season 6 housemate
Eddy	12 June	13 June	season 7 housemate
Harry	16 June	17 June	season 2 housemate
Sascha	17 June	18 June	season 5 winner
Norman	18 June	19 June	season 6 housemate
Kathrin	19 June	20 June	season 7 housemate

== See also ==
- Main Article about the show
