= Big Brother (German TV series) season 12 =

Big Brother
- Season 12
- Presented by: Jochen Bendel
- No. of days: 92
- No. of housemates: 18
- Winner: Lusy Skaya
- Runner-up: Alexandra "Sharon" Reiche

Release
- Original network: sixx
- Original release: September 22 – December 22, 2015

Season chronology
- ← Previous; Season 11 Next → Season 13

Big Brother 2015 is the twelfth season of German reality series Big Brother. The show began on 22 September 2015, after the last season was on 2011. The show now airs on sixx and is hosted by Jochen Bendel.

In this season, housemates competed in pairs. On Day 29 the teams were mixed and so each housemate got a new teammate, except for Christian who now had the 'power' to decide. On Day 43 each male housemate decided which female housemate should be in their teams. On Day 57 the housemates decided which housemate should become the first finalist. After a tie between Christian, Lusy and Thomas the public decided that Lusy became the first finalist with 55% of the votes. The final was aired on the 22 December 2015. Lusy was announced as the winner with Sharon being the runner-up. She is only the fourth woman to be crowned as the winner.

== Housemates ==
Name	Age on entry	Hometown	Occupation	Day entered	Day exited	Result
Lusy Skaya	26	Vienna, Austria	Fitness shop owner	1	92	Winner
Alexandra "Sharon" Reiche	23	Hamburg	Stripper	1	92	Runner-up
Guido Soethof	39	Kerken	Car mechanic	15	92	3rd Place
Bianca Döhring	36	Hamburg	Personal trainer	1	92	4th Place
Christian Knospe	23	Erfurt	IT manager	1	92	5th Place
Thomas Wiele	32	Aschersleben	Self-employed	1	92	6th Place
Maria Gangutis	21	Munich	Waitress	15	85	Evicted
Natascha Agai	24	Nuremberg	Video game streamer	43	85	Evicted
Beate Er	40	Berlin	Travel agent	43	78	Evicted
Dennis Riesop	24	Duisburg	Unemployed	50	71	Evicted
Aresch "Atchi" Tahaie-Abedi	35	Berlin	Journalist	1	57	Evicted
Kevin Temme	26	Dortmund	Car salesman	1	46	Walked
Manuel Campa	31	Essen	Bodyguard	1	46	Walked
Ása Ástardóttir	41	Cologne	Self-employed	1	43	Evicted
Hans-Christian Haas	36	Vienna, Austria	Model	1	29	Evicted
Isabell Hendl	30	Nuremberg	Hairdresser	1	15	Evicted
Tim Heilig	21	Leutkirch im Allgäu	Artist	1	13	Walked
Sophia(-Elaine) Sirena	33	Hamburg	Dancer	1	8	Evicted

== Nominations table ==
	Week 1	Week 2		Week 4	Week 6	Week 8	Week 10	Week 11	Week 12		Week 13 Final		Nominations received
	Week 1	Week 2		Week 4	Week 6	Week 8	Week 10	Week 11	Day 78	Day 85	Week 13 Final		Nominations received
Lusy	No nominations	Isabell		Hans-Christian, Atchi	Sharon	Atchi	Sharon	Sharon	Sharon, Thomas	Exempt	Winner (Day 92)		7
Sharon	No nominations	Isabell		Bianca, Hans-Christian	Lusy	Lusy	Beate	Beate	Guido, Natascha	Nominated	Runner-Up (Day 92)		18
Guido	Not in House			Sharon, Hans-Christian	Atchi	Sharon	Dennis	Bianca	Natascha, Maria	Nominated	Third Place (Day 92)		6
Bianca	No nominations	Manuel		Hans-Christian, Kevin	Sharon	Sharon	Sharon	Beate	Guido, Natascha	Nominated	Fourth Place (Day 92)		13
Christian	No nominations	Isabell		Hans-Christian, Bianca	Sharon	Atchi	Dennis	Beate	Guido, Natascha	Exempt	Fifth Place (Day 92)		2
Thomas	No nominations	Bianca		Christian, Bianca	Lusy	Sharon	Beate	Beate	Guido, Maria	Exempt	Sixth Place (Day 92)		3
Maria	Not in House			Christian, Ása	Ása	Guido	Dennis	Beate	Guido, Thomas	Nominated	Evicted (Day 85)		2
Natascha	Not in House					Sharon	Sharon	Bianca	Sharon, Bianca	Evicted (Day 85)			4
Beate	Not in House					Atchi	Dennis	Bianca	Evicted (Day 78)				7
Dennis	Not in House					Atchi	Beate	Evicted (Day 71)					4
Atchi	No nominations	Hans-Christian		Hans-Christian, Bianca	Lusy, Sharon	Lusy	Evicted (Day 57)						7
Kevin	No nominations	Hans-Christian		Hans-Christian, Bianca	Lusy	Walked (Day 46)							1
Manuel	No nominations	Hans-Christian		Hans-Christian, Bianca	Lusy	Walked (Day 46)							3
Ása	No nominations	Atchi		Hans-Christian, Bianca	Sharon	Evicted (Day 43)							4
Hans-Christian	No nominations	Manuel		Ása, Bianca	Evicted (Day 29)								15
Isabell	No nominations	Hans-Christian		Evicted (Day 15)									3
Tim	No nominations	Manuel	Walked (Day 13)										0
Sophia	No nominations	Evicted (Day 8)											N/A
Public nomination	None	Hans-Christian		Hans-Christian, Ása	Sharon	Atchi	Thomas	Sharon	None				
Immune	None						Lusy		Christian, Lusy	Christian, Lusy, Thomas	None		
Against public vote	All; Housemates	Hans-Christian, Tim	Ása, Atchi, Hans-Christian, Isabell, Manuel	Guido, Hans-Christian	Ása, Guido, Lusy, Sharon	Atchi, Maria, Sharon	Beate, Dennis, Guido, Maria, Sharon	Beate, Bianca	Guido, Natascha	Bianca, Guido, Maria, Sharon	Bianca, Christian, Guido, Lusy, Sharon, Thomas		
Walked	none	Tim	none			Kevin, Manuel	none						
Evicted	Sophia; Fewest votes (out of 3) to save	Eviction cancelled	Isabell; Fewest votes (out of 2) to save	Hans-Christian; 33.3% to save	Ása; 44.3% to save	Atchi; 36% to save	Dennis; 46% (out of 2) to save	Beate; 36% to save	Natascha; 17% to save	Maria; 11.6% to save	Thomas; Fewest votes (out of 6)	Christian; Fewest votes (out of 5)	
Evicted	Sophia; Fewest votes (out of 3) to save	Eviction cancelled	Isabell; Fewest votes (out of 2) to save	Hans-Christian; 33.3% to save	Ása; 44.3% to save	Atchi; 36% to save	Dennis; 46% (out of 2) to save	Beate; 36% to save	Natascha; 17% to save	Maria; 11.6% to save	Bianca; Fewest votes (out of 4)	Guido; 29.0% (out of 3)	
Evicted	Sophia; Fewest votes (out of 3) to save	Eviction cancelled	Isabell; Fewest votes (out of 2) to save	Hans-Christian; 33.3% to save	Ása; 44.3% to save	Atchi; 36% to save	Dennis; 46% (out of 2) to save	Beate; 36% to save	Natascha; 17% to save	Maria; 11.6% to save	Sharon; 46.0% (out of 2)	Lusy; 54.0% to win	
