= Big Brother (German TV series) season 7 =

Big Brother
- Season 7
- Presented by: Charlotte Karlinder
- No. of days: 148
- No. of housemates: 17
- Winner: Michael Carstensen
- Runner-up: Sonja Ailler
- No. of episodes: 156

Release
- Original network: RTL Zwei
- Original release: 5 February – 7 July 2007

Season chronology
- ← Previous; Season 6 Next → Season 8

The seventh season of Big Brother Germany lasted for 148 days from 5 February 2007 to 7 July 2007 and was shown on RTL Zwei.

== Summary ==
After a disappointing sixth season, which was supposed to run forever but was cut short and a year break the producers decided to return with a "Back to the roots"-format for season seven with 12 housemates living together in one house and the only twist being that the housemates had to earn the prize. For every match, a certain amount of money was put in the jackpot with the maximum being €250,000 which only the winner would receive. During the season the nomination rules were changed several times (see notes in the nominations table) for entertainment purposes and to protect controversial housemates. The most controversial of them was Eddy, who was disliked by a large number of viewers but also had a strong fanbase. Within the house, he had friends (e.g. Basti and Oliver) and "enemies" (e.g. Leon and Janine), with alliances changing over the season (he was friends with Kathrin and Michael at first, but fell out with them later). After being evicted by his fellow housemates Eddy returned as a guest in the final week and provoked some of the most controversial moments of the season (with his targets being Kathrin and Michael). These moments probably helped Michael to win the show, as he was considered a victim of Eddy's provocations. Additionally, Michael's strongest rival for the win, Sonja, had become Basti's girlfriend during the season and Basti was close with Eddy (Basti re-entered as a guest in the final week together with Eddy). Despite not being a rating hit, season 7 at least lived up to RTL II's low expectations and an 8th Season was greenlit right at the end of the show.

== Housemates ==
Name	Age on entry	Hometown	Occupation	Day entered	Day exited	Result
Michael Carstensen	34	Viöl	Bricklayer	1	148	Winner
Sonja Ailler	20	Griesstätt	Office clerk	1	148	Runner-up
Kathrin Schlosser	32	Hiltenfingen	Forwarding merchant	71	148	3rd Place
Kathrin Schlosser	32	Hiltenfingen	Forwarding merchant	1	57	Walked
Leon Schreiber	22	Krailling	Promoter	1	148	4th Place
Andreas "Knubbel" Büttgenbach	45	Bonn	Courier	50	148	5th Place
Janine Schmelz	20	Kirchhain	Nurse	64	141	Evicted
Erdal "Eddy" Ayebe	28	Krefeld	Electronic engineer	1	127	Evicted
Sebastian "Basti" Wrzosek	24	Wuppertal	Warehouseman	1	120	Evicted
Doreen Heineke	23	Jena	Hairdresser	50	106	Evicted
Oliver Hofmann	30	Schneverdingen	Banker	3	92	Evicted
Sinan Karaaslan	29	Duisburg	Airport security guard	22	78	Evicted
Sheila Schmidt	19	Herne	Student	5	71	Walked
Ines Gebhard	31	Grabsdorf	Waitress	5	64	Evicted
Natalie "Natasha" Root	25	Deckenpfronn	Real estate agent	36	57	Evicted
Jeannine Emmel-Ehmsen	24	Hamburg	Agency boss	3	50	Evicted
Anna Masaracchia	31	Munich	Nurse	1	36	Evicted
Christian Dorn	26	Marl	Online salesman	1	22	Evicted

== Nominations table ==
	Week 3	Week 5	Week 7	Week 8	Week 9	Week 11	Week 13	Week 15	Week 17	Week 18	Week 20	Week 21 Final		Nominations received
Michael	Sonja	Anna	Ines	Ines	Ines	5th 56 points	Oliver	Eddy; Sonja	Janine	Eddy	Janine	Winner (Day 148)		8
Sonja	Jeannine	Jeannine	Ines	Oliver	Refused	1st 80 points	Michael	Knubbel; Doreen	Janine	Janine	Janine	Runner-up (Day 148)		3
Kathrin	Eddy	Anna	Ines	Walked (Day 56)			Knubbel	Michael; Janine	Knubbel	Eddy	Knubbel	Third place (Day 148)		7
Leon	Christian	Anna	Ines	Natasha	Ines	7th 51 points	Basti	Eddy; Basti	Basti	Eddy	Knubbel	Fourth place (Day 148)		8
Knubbel	Not in House			Eddy	Refused	10th 35 points	Michael	Eddy; Janine	Kathrin	Janine	Kathrin	Fifth place (Day 148)		7
Janine	Not in House					Exempt	Knubbel	Eddy; Michael	Basti	Eddy	Sonja	Evicted (Day 141)		9
Eddy	Kathrin	Banned	Ines	Ines	Refused	3rd 67 points	Michael	Michael; Doreen	Leon	Janine	Evicted (Day 127)			11
Basti	Anna	Banned	Ines	Natasha	Oliver	2nd 72 points	Michael	Leon; Doreen	Leon	Evicted (Day 120)				6
Doreen	Not in House			Natasha	Refused	9th 43 points	Knubbel	Eddy; Basti	Evicted (Day 106)					3
Oliver	Christian; Leon	Basti	Leon	Leon	Refused	6th 53 points	Michael	Evicted (Day 92)						2
Sinan	Not in House	Sheila	Leon	Natasha	Refused	8th 46 points	Evicted (Day 78)							0
Sheila	Christian	Kathrin	Ines	Ines	Refused	4th 57 points	Walked (Day 71)							2
Ines	Kathrin	Michael	Leon	Michael	Refused	Evicted (Day 64)								9
Natasha	Not in House		Leon	Sinan	Evicted (Day 57)									N/A
Jeannine	Sheila	Anna	Oliver	Evicted (Day 50)										2
Anna	Kathrin	Banned	Evicted (Day 36)											5
Christian	Kathrin	Evicted (Day 22)												3
Nomination Note	1	2	3	4	5	6	7	8	9	10	none			
Walked	none			Kathrin	none	Sheila	none							
Up for eviction	Christian, Kathrin, Leon	Anna, Sheila	Ines, Jeannine, Sheila	Basti, Eddy, Ines, Leon, Michael, Natasha, Oliver, Sheila, Sinan, Sonja	Ines, Oliver	Doreen, Knubbel, Sinan	Knubbel, Michael, Oliver	Eddy, Doreen, Knubbel	Basti, Janine, Leon	Eddy, Janine, Kathrin	Janine, Knubbel	Kathrin, Knubbel, Leon, Michael, Sonja		
Evicted	Christian -65.9% to evict	Anna -72.8% to evict	Jeannine -64.8% to evict	Natasha; 4 of 12 votes to evict	Ines -46.9% to evict	Sinan -67.1% to evict	Oliver -70.9% to evict	Doreen -56.9% to evict	Basti -66.9% to evict	Eddy; 4 of 7 votes to evict	Janine -61.8% to evict	Knubbel; 16% (out of 5)	Leon; 17.1% (out of 4)	
Evicted	Christian -65.9% to evict	Anna -72.8% to evict	Jeannine -64.8% to evict	Natasha; 4 of 12 votes to evict	Ines -46.9% to evict	Sinan -67.1% to evict	Oliver -70.9% to evict	Doreen -56.9% to evict	Basti -66.9% to evict	Eddy; 4 of 7 votes to evict	Janine -61.8% to evict	Kathrin; 20.1% (out of 3)	Sonja; 42.4% (out of 2)	
Evicted	Christian -65.9% to evict	Anna -72.8% to evict	Jeannine -64.8% to evict	Natasha; 4 of 12 votes to evict	Ines -46.9% to evict	Sinan -67.1% to evict	Oliver -70.9% to evict	Doreen -56.9% to evict	Basti -66.9% to evict	Eddy; 4 of 7 votes to evict	Janine -61.8% to evict	Michael; 57.6% to win		

=== Notes ===
- ^Note 1 : As the Golden Housemate of the Week, Oliver had the option to nominate a third person that would automatically up for eviction. He chose to take this offer and nominated Leon.
- ^Note 2 : As new Housemate, Sinan had to nominate one person that would be automatically up for eviction. He chose Sheila. Anna, Basti and Eddy were banned from nominating as punishment for discussing nominations.
- ^Note 3 : As a new Housemate, Natasha was immune from getting nominated. Sheila was automatically nominated after losing a football competition. Jeannine was automatically nominated for having after achieving the last place in a karaoke competition. Eddy received a nominations point from the viewers.
- ^Note 4 : For constant rule-breaking by the household Big Brother decided to organize a snap eviction with the person who received the most votes immediately evicted. As new housemates, Doreen and Knubbel were immuned from eviction.
- ^Note 5 : Nominations were voluntary, so only two Housemates nominated this week. However, as the Golden Housemate of the Week, Basti had to nominate a second person that would face the public vote. He chose Oliver.
- ^Note 6 : As a new Housemate, Janine was exempt from nominations. Nominations were done in Eurovision Style, where every Housemate had to give 9 nomination points to their favourite Housemate, 8 for their second favourite all the way down to 1 point for their least favourite. The bottom three were nominated for eviction.
- ^Note 7 : As the Golden Housemate of the Week, Eddy was immune from being nominated. Next to this, all female Housemates could nominate but could not be nominated. Nominations were done face-to-face. As there was a tie for the third nomination place Eddy, as the Golden Housemate, had to choose the third nominee from either Basti or Oliver, who both received one nomination point. He chose Oliver.
- ^Note 8 : As he came last in the marathon match, Knubbel was automatically nominated. This week's nominations were made by the housemates' mothers (and Knubbels sister). After the Housemates refused to complete their weekly task Big Brother decided that an extra Housemate should be up for eviction three days after the voting started. The Housemates each had to nominate someone for eviction. Eddy and Knubbel could not be nominated as they are already up for eviction. Doreen received the most nominations with 3 and was up for eviction with Eddy and Knubbel.
- ^Note 9 : The audience voted for Eddy as being immune from getting nominated.
- ^Note 10 : This week's nominations were made by the public. The housemate then had to decide whom of the top 3 vote-getters would be evicted.

== See also ==
- Main Article about the show
