= Big Brother (German TV series) =

- Genre: Reality
- Based on: Big Brother by John de Mol Jr.
- Presented by: Percy Hoven; Oliver Geissen; Aleksandra Bechtel; Ruth Moschner; Oliver Petszokat; Charlotte Karlinder; Miriam Pielhau; Jochen Bendel; Jochen Schropp; Elena Gruschka; Melissa Khalaj
- Opening theme: Various (see below)
- Country of origin: Germany
- Original language: German
- No. of seasons: 14

Production
- Running time: 60 minutes
- Production company: EndemolShine Germany

Original release
- Network: RTL Zwei
- Release: 28 February 2000 – 12 September 2011
- Network: sixx
- Release: 22 September – 22 December 2015
- Network: Sat.1
- Release: 10 February – 18 May 2020
- Release: 24 April 2024 – present

Related
- Promi Big Brother

Big Brother is the German version of the international reality television franchise Big Brother created by producer John de Mol Jr. in 1997. Following the premise of other versions of the format, the show followed a number of contestants, known as housemates, who are isolated from the outside world for an extended period of time in a custom-built house. Each week, one of the housemates is evicted by a public vote, with the last housemate remaining winning a cash prize.

Big Brother premiered on 28 February 2000 and ran for eleven seasons on RTL Zwei (formerly spelled RTL 2 and RTL II) before the network cancelled it in September 2011. Big Brother returned on 22 September 2015 on sixx, and lasted for one season. After a 5-year break, Sat.1 rebooted the series on 10 February 2020. Three years later, in October 2023, it was announced by EndemolShine Germany and Sat.1 that Big Brother would return for his fourteenth season on 2024.

The show also featured a 24-hour live feed, in which fans could view the inside of the house at any time on the German pay channel Premiere and Sky until the twelfth season. In the Sat.1 iteration of the show, however, there was no 24-hour live stream offered from the inside of the house.

After a two-year hiatus, the show was bought and revamped by Sat.1 as Promi Big Brother, the first celebrity version of the German version, with the first season premiering on 13 September 2013. Cindy aus Marzahn and Oliver Pocher were announced as the new presenters of the revived show in August 2013. Jochen Schropp is hosting the show since season 2, and with Jochen Bendel, also hosted Series 5. Since season 6, Schropp and Marlene Lufen are hosting the show together.

== Format ==
Big Brother Germany is based on the international Big Brother series produced by Endemol in the Netherlands which began in 1999. The show's name comes from George Orwell's novel Nineteen Eighty-Four (1949), which revolves around a dystopia in which dictator Big Brother is the all-seeing leader. A group of people (called the Housemates) live together in a house, where 24 hours a day their every word and every action is recorded by cameras and microphones in all the rooms in the house. Access to television, the Internet, print media, and time is prohibited. In addition, the housemates live in complete confinement; they have no access to the outside world. At least once a week, the housemates secretly nominate two housemates they wish to face a public vote to evict. The two or more housemates with the most votes face the public vote. The viewing public decides which of them gets evicted through text message votes or phone calls. The nominee with the most votes is evicted and leaves the house.

Should their stay inside the house become difficult for them to bear, a housemate is allowed to voluntarily leave at any time during the game. In the event of a withdrawal from the house, a replacement housemate usually enters in their place.

In the final week of each season, the viewers vote for which of the remaining people in the house should win the prize money and be crowned the winner of Big Brother.

=== Changes of the Concept ===
Since the start of its first season in February 2000, Big Brother Germany went through numerous changes in its concept. Here are some significant examples of the progress of modifying the rules of the original game:

- "Only the housemates have to decide which of them gets nominated.": Besides in season 7 the viewers could decide for only 1 time which of them gets nominated.
- "None of the housemates know each other before entering the house.": changed in season 3 with a couple in a romantic relationship entering the house.
- "The prize money is a certainty": changed in season 4 by letting the final four housemates doing challenges and giving them a quarter of the original prize money for every succeeded challenge.
- "The complete household lives together in one group": changed in season 4 by dividing the house into two parts with a "rich" and a "poor" area and splitting the household into two competing teams. Season 6 gets three houses where the housemates have to live in.
- "All the housemates live together in one house": changed in season 6 with building a whole "Big Brother village" including five houses and a farm. In season 13 were two houses the "Glasshouse" and the "Blockhouse".
- "The show runs for three months": changed in season 5 with expanding the show to one year.
- "The show is supposed to run for a certain time": changed in season 6 with the announcement that the show would run as long as the ratings were acceptable, it actually lasted 363 days.
- "Only the winner receives prize money": changed in season 6 with the creation of three areas for the housemates where they had to work and earn money, which was given to them when they got evicted (housemates who left the house voluntary did not receive any money).
- "The housemates get no information from outside": changed in season 5 where the housemates were allowed to watch the RTL2 News after winning a game and in order to learn about a terrorist attack. In season 13 the viewers can write comments for the housemates and the comments are regularly shown to the house.

=== Prize money ===
The winner of Big Brother Germany receives a cash prize for being the last remaining housemate:

- In Big Brother 1 and Big Brother 2, the winner received DM250,000.
- In Big Brother 3, the winner received DM300,000, which was increased from DM250,000.
- In Big Brother 4, the winner received €90,000, which was reduced from €100,000.
- In Big Brother 5, the winner received after 365 days in the Big Brother House €1,000,000.
- From Big Brother 6 until Big Brother 10, the winner received €250,000.
- In Big Brother 11, the winner received €125,000, which was increased from €100,000.
- In Big Brother 12 and Big Brother 13, the winner received €100,000.
- In Big Brother 15, the winner received €50,000.

=== Theme ===
Some seasons include a theme.

Season	Theme
1	—N/a
2	Back to Basics
3	—N/a
4	The Battle
5	365 Days - 1 Million Euro
6	The Village
7	Who are you really?
8	Rich vs. Poor
9	Heaven and Hell/Reloaded
10	Everyone got a secret
11	The Secret
12	Back to Basics
13	Big Brother 20
14	—N/a
15	—N/a

=== Smoking in the house ===
Unlike in many other Big Brother houses, in the Big Brother Germany house smoking is allowed outdoors and indoors. This is because Germany has no smoking ban.

== Series details ==
Series	Days	Housemates	Winner	Runner-up	Episodes	Originally released		
Series	Days	Housemates	Winner	Runner-up	Episodes	First released	Last released	Network
1	103	13	John Milz	Jürgen Milski	116	28 February 2000	9 June 2000	RTL Zwei
2	106	17	Alida Kurras	Harry Schmidt	112	16 September 2000	30 December 2000	RTL Zwei
3	106	13	Karina Schreiber	Medy Hussein	108	27 January 2001	12 May 2001	RTL Zwei
4	99	19	Jan Geilhufe	Nadja Steininger	111	31 March 2003	7 July 2003	RTL Zwei
5	365	59	Sascha Sirtl	Franziska Lewandrowski	419	2 March 2004	1 March 2005	RTL Zwei
6	363	59	Michael Knopf	Thomas Motz	369	1 March 2005	26 February 2006	RTL Zwei
7	148	17	Michael Carstensen	Sonja Ailler	156	5 February 2007	7 July 2007	RTL Zwei
8	183	25	Silke "Isi" Kaufmann	Marcel Schiefelbein	183	7 January 2008	7 July 2008	RTL Zwei
9	211	30	Daniel Schöller	Marcel Schiefelbein	211	8 December 2008	6 July 2009	RTL Zwei
10	211	32	Timo Grätsch	Marc Maurer	220	11 January 2010	9 August 2010	RTL Zwei
11	134	22	Marc Sonnen	Dagmar Szlachta	153	2 May 2011	12 September 2011	RTL Zwei
12	92	18	Lusy Skaya	Alexandra Reiche	92	22 September 2015	22 December 2015	sixx
13	99	18	Cedric Beidinger	Gina Beckmann	85	10 February 2020	18 May 2020	Sat.1
14	99	20	Marcus Bräuer	Frauke Drathschmidt	85	4 March 2024	10 June 2024	Sat.1; Joyn
15	50	18	Marcel Schiefelbein	Tanja Steidel	36	24 February 2025	14 April 2025	sixx Joyn

== Broadcasting ==
Big Brother Germany was broadcast by RTL Zwei from season 1 until 11, sixx for season 12 and Sat.1 from season 13.

Season	Monday	Tuesday	Wednesday	Thursday	Friday	Saturday	Sunday	Neptunday
1	Highlights Shows (8:15 pm – 9:00 pm)				The Decision Shows (8:15 pm – 9:15 pm)	Highlights Shows (10:15 pm – 11:00 pm)	Highlights Shows (9:15 pm – 10:00 pm)	Highlights Shows (8:15 pm – 9:00 pm)
2	Highlights Shows (8:15 pm – 9:00 pm)					The Decision Shows (9:15 pm – 11:15 pm)	The Decision Shows (8:45 pm – 10:00 pm)	Highlights Shows (8:15 pm – 9:00 pm)
3	Highlights Shows (8:15 pm – 9:00 pm)					The Decision Shows (9:15 pm – 11:15 pm)	The Decision Shows (8:45 pm – 10:00 pm)	Highlights Shows (8:15 pm – 9:00 pm)
4	Highlights Shows (7:00 pm – 7:45 pm); The Decision Shows (9:15 pm – 11:15 pm)	Highlights Shows (7:00 pm – 7:45 pm)						
5	Highlights Shows (7:00 pm – 8:00 pm); The Decision Shows (9:15 pm – 11:15 pm - One night a week)							
6	Highlights Shows (7:00 pm – 8:00 pm); The Decision Shows (9:15 pm – 11:15 pm - One night a week)							
7	Highlights Shows (7:00 pm – 8:00 pm); The Decision Shows (9:15 pm – 11:15 pm)	Highlights Shows (7:00 pm – 8:00 pm)						—N/a
8	Highlights Shows (7:00 pm – 8:00 pm); The Decision Shows (9:15 pm – 11:15 pm)	Highlights Shows (7:00 pm – 8:00 pm)						—N/a
9	Highlights Shows (7:00 pm – 8:00 pm); The Decision Shows (9:15 pm – 11:15 pm)	Highlights Shows (7:00 pm – 8:00 pm)						—N/a
10	Highlights Shows (7:00 pm – 8:00 pm); The Decision Shows (9:15 pm – 11:15 pm)	Highlights Shows (7:00 pm – 8:00 pm)						—N/a
11	Highlights Shows (7:00 pm – 8:00 pm); The Decision Shows (9:15 pm – 11:15 pm)	Highlights Shows (7:00 pm – 8:00 pm)						
12	Highlights Shows (10:10 pm – 11:10 pm)	The Decision Shows (8:15 pm – 10:15 pm)	Highlights Shows (10:10 pm – 11:10 pm)					
13	Highlights Shows (7:00 pm – 7:55 pm); The Decision Shows (8:15 pm – 10:15 pm)	Highlights Shows (7:00 pm – 7:55 pm)				—N/a		
14	Live Launch (8:15 pm – 10:15 pm); Weekly Live Shows (10:55 pm – 11:55 pm)	Highlights Shows (9:00 pm – 9:35 pm)						
15	Live Launch (11:15 pm – 12:30 am); Highlights shows (7:00 pm – 7:30 pm); Big Brother - Die Show (7:15 pm – 8:15 pm)	Highlights shows (7:00 pm – 7:30 pm); Big Brother - Die Show (7:15 pm – 8:15 pm)				—N/a		

=== Spin-off shows ===
In the first season a spin-off show with the name Der Talk (The Talk) was aired on Sundays from 21:15 to 22:15 on RTL Zwei.

In the second and third season, a spin-off show called "Family and Friends" aired live from 16:45 to 17:45, the show presented by Aleksandra Bechtel.

In season thirteen, a live late-night show with the name Die Late Night Show was aired on sixx every Mondays after The Decision Show, in which the debriefing spoke about what was happening in the house. The hosts were Jochen Bendel and Melissa Khalaj. Also every Sunday on IGTV was broadcast a short minute web show titled Recap mit Aaron Troschke. In this, Aaron Troschke as the host commented on the events from the last week.

== Presenters ==
Presenter(s)
Co-presenter(s)

Big Brother Cast
Person	Season														
Person	1	2	3	4	5	6	7	8	9	10	11	12	13	14	15
Percy Hoven															
Thorsten Wember															
Sophie Rosentreter															
Oliver Geissen															
Aleksandra Bechtel															
Gudrun Loeb															
Ruth Moschner															
Christian Möllmann															
Oliver Petszokat															
Jochen Bendel															
Charlotte Karlinder															
Jürgen Milski															
Miriam Pielhau															
Alida Kurras-Lauenstein															
Sonja Zietlow (Note: Sonja Zietlow hosted only the Launch Night.)															
Jochen Schropp															
Melissa Khalaj															
Aaron Troschke															
Elena Gruschka															

== Intros ==
Season	Song (English translation)	Performer
1/11/14/15	"Leb" (Live)	Die 3. Generation
2	"Zeig mir dein Gesicht" (Show Me Your Face)	Berger
3	"Nur die Wahrheit zählt" (Only Truth Counts)	Ayman and Naima
4	"Alles ändert sich" (Everything Changes)	Oli P. feat. Lukas
5	"Alles was du willst" (Everything You Want)	Lex
6	"Deine Welt" (Your World)	(Own composition)
7	"Ich seh was, was du nicht siehst" (I See Something You Do Not See)	Senta-Sofia
8	"Chose to Be Me"	Sunrise Avenue
9	"Everybody"	Mousse T.
10	"Schöne neue Welt" (Brave New World)	Culcha Candela
12	"Sparks"	Neon Hitch
13	"Follow the Leader"	Cosby

== Reception and popularity ==
Big Brother was a social phenomenon when it began in 2000. At some point in the first season it hit a 70% rating share. Despite massive popularity, ratings in the third season started to decline. RTL II decided to take the show off the air for one year (2002).

The program returned in 2003 with a completely modified format and lower expectations. Much higher ratings and sponsors' interest resulted in the following season. The fifth season reached up to high expectations of the producers. The high success of the fifth season resulted in a back-to-back season, which was supposed to run for at least a few years. However, ratings started to decline and the show was hiding in the shadow of its former glory. The producers decided to end the show after its first year on air.

A Year-and-half later, in 2007, RTL II decided to return to the old, original format of the program, marking the seventh season as "Back to Basics". Despite this, the renewed format was not a ratings hit, but it reached up to the producers' low expectations.

The producers tried to renew the format for the eleventh season, because of the tenth season-low achievements (The finale of the tenth season had 1.39 million viewers). Viewing figures however decline in the eleventh season, but producers made an impression of success with duration and prize extension. The ratings in the eleventh season rarely reached a 10% share.
