= Big Brother (German TV series) season 1 =

Big Brother
- Season 1
- Presented by: Percy Hoven
- No. of days: 102
- No. of housemates: 13
- Winner: John Milz
- Runner-up: Jürgen Milski
- No. of episodes: 116

Release
- Original network: RTL Zwei
- Original release: 28 February – 9 June 2000

Season chronology
- Next → Season 2

The first season of Big Brother Germany started on 28 February 2000 and lasted 102 days until 9 June 2000 on RTL Zwei.

== Season summary ==
It was the first adaptation of the original show with the same name that was aired six months earlier in the Netherlands. Never experienced with such a format, the German public remained doubtful until the start and German politics tried to forbid to air the show.

However, after being on air a few weeks, the show proved to be a massive ratings hit with German audience and Macedonian contestant Zlatko Trpkovski immediately went on to become a love-hate character for his clueless way of speaking and not knowing who William Shakespeare was. He went on to survive his first nomination; however, when he was nominated against Jürgen, his best friend in the house, he was evicted. On his way out of the house he was witnessed by reportedly 3,000 people outside of the house with cheers and was celebrated as being the winner. However in the same night the audience was shouting "Manu raus!" ("Get Manu out!") targeting Manuela, one of Zlatko's major threats in the house and after the remaining housemates were able to hear the reactions one of the basic rules (no contact to the outside world) were broken.

Manuela was the next person to be evicted while Zlatko started to build a career upon his newfound fame. Although not really being a talented singer, he recorded a single which went straight to no. 1 on the German single charts and got his own show named Zlatkos Welt (Zlatko's World) on RTL 2. He eventually recorded a duet named "Großer Bruder (Big Brother)" with his buddy Jürgen, while that one was still a contestant on the show and therefore clueless about starting his own singing career, which topped the charts as well and was even a bigger success than Zlatko's debut single and the theme of the first season "Leb! (Live!)", the first no. 1 hit by the Big Brother franchise. Several contestants of the show tried to break into music business; however, none of them made any huge impact (mostly because of obvious lack of talent, questionable lyrics and low-profile productions) and none of their fames lasted longer than to the end of the year.

The show was at its peak when German celebrity Verona Feldbusch entered the house for one night in the second half of the show. Over 70% of the German audience witnessed her entry on screen. Feldbusch made a second entry to the house in the second season of the show and was followed by several minor celebrities in the next seasons.

Being the hands-down favorite to win, Jürgen was beaten in a very close vote by east-German John Milz who remained quiet throughout the entire series and was known as rarely having arguments with his fellow housemates. Being tattooed and pierced, he appeared like a rough rocker on first sight but proved to be a rather soft and caring father with very liberal views. From the prize money he bought a car for his girlfriend and mother of his daughter saying "she had to do the work during my stay". Later it became public that John was cheated by her during the show.

The first season of Big Brother is mostly considered as "the birth of reality television" in Germany had a huge impact on German television which saw several similar formats making their way to the screens in the next months and years, however the success of Big Brother was never beaten by any other show and the viewers tend to say that the first has been the only real Big Brother season due to the contestants never expecting such a success and being their own throughout the show.

== Housemates ==
Name	Age on entry	Hometown	Day entered	Day exited	Result
John Milz	26	Potsdam	1	102	Winner
Jürgen Milski	36	Cologne	1	102	Runner-up
Andrea Singh	32	Cologne	1	102	3rd Place
Sabrina Lange	32	Cologne	48	97	Evicted
Verena Malta	28	Cologne	62	83	Evicted
Alex Jolig	37	Bonn	1	69	Evicted
Kerstin Klinz	26	Berlin	1	55	Walked
Manuela Schick	23	Hamburg	1	55	Evicted
Jona Klein	20	Hückeswagen	13	48	Walked
Zlatko Trpkovski	24	Nattheim	1	41	Evicted
Jana Orban	24	Kamp-Lintfort	1	27	Evicted
Thomas Hendrick	23	Iserlohn	1	13	Evicted
Despina Eftimescu	29	Munich	1	6	Walked

== Nominations table ==
	Week 2	Week 4	Week 6	Week 8	Week 10	Week 12	Week 14	Week 15 Final		Nominations received
John	Despina, Zlatko	Jana, Andrea	Jürgen, Zlatko	Kerstin, Manuela	Jürgen, Sabrina	Jürgen, Verena	Andrea, Sabrina	Winner (Day 102)		10
Jürgen	Despina, Thomas	Jona, John	Kerstin, Manuela	Kerstin, Manuela	Alex, Sabrina	John, Verena	Andrea, Sabrina	Runner-up (Day 102)		16
Andrea	Despina, Thomas	Jona, Zlatko	Manuela, Kerstin	Kerstin, Manuela	Alex, Jürgen	Sabrina, Verena	John, Jürgen	Third place (Day 102)		8
Sabrina	Not in House				Alex, John	Andrea, Verena	Andrea, John	Evicted (Day 97)		5
Verena	Not in House					John, Jürgen	Evicted (Day 83)			4
Alex	Despina, Jurgen	Jana, Jürgen	Jürgen, Zlatko	Andrea, John	John, Jurgen	Evicted (Day 69)				5
Kerstin	Andrea, Despina	Jana, Jürgen	Jürgen, Zlatko	Andrea, Jürgen	Walked (Day 55)					6
Manuela	Despina, Jana	Jana, Zlatko	Jürgen, Zlatko	Andrea, Jürgen	Evicted (Day 55)					6
Jona	Not in House	Jana, Jurgen	Alex, Jürgen	Walked (Day 48)						4
Zlatko	Despina, Thomas	Jona, John	Kerstin, Manuela	Evicted (Day 41)						10
Jana	Despina, Zlatko	Jona, John	Evicted (Day 27)							6
Thomas	Alex, Despina	Evicted (Day 13)								4
Despina	Despina, Thomas	Walked (Day 6)								10
Nominated	~~Despina~~, Thomas, Zlatko	Jana, Jona	Jürgen, Zlatko	Andrea, Kerstin, Manuela	Alex, Jürgen	John, Jürgen, Verena	Andrea, John, Sabrina	Andrea, John, Jürgen		
Walked	Despina	none		Jona	Kerstin	none				
Evicted	Thomas; 53% to evict	Jana; 63% to evict	Zlatko; 58.5% to evict	Manuela; 51.7% to evict	Alex; 61% to evict	Verena; 77.6% to evict	Sabrina; 61.4% to evict	Andrea; 11.7% (out of 3)	Jürgen; 49.6% (out of 2)	
Evicted	Thomas; 53% to evict	Jana; 63% to evict	Zlatko; 58.5% to evict	Manuela; 51.7% to evict	Alex; 61% to evict	Verena; 77.6% to evict	Sabrina; 61.4% to evict	John; 50.4% to win		

== See also ==
- Main Article about the show
