= Mark of the Devil Part II =

Hexen geschändet und zu Tode gequält
- German theatrical poster
- Directed by: Adrian Hoven
- Written by: Michael Armstrong; Adrian Hoven; Fred Denger
- Produced by: Adrian Hoven
- Starring: Erika Blanc; Anton Diffring; Reggie Nalder
- Cinematography: Ernst W. Kalinke
- Edited by: Siegrun Jäger
- Music by: Don Banks; John Scott; Sam Sklair
- Distributed by: Hallmark Releasing (USA)
- Release date: 1973
- Running time: 97 minutes
- Country: West Germany

Mark of the Devil Part II, or in original German Hexen geschändet und zu Tode gequält (lit. "Witches Are Violated and Tortured to Death"), is a German horror film released in 1973. It is a sequel to Mark of the Devil.

== Plot ==
Young noblewoman Elisabeth von Salmenau encounters a group of religious fanatics led by Balthasar von Ross and his henchman Natas. Her husband is killed and her young son Alexander is deemed the devil's spawn. Elisabeth intends to plead the innocence of her son, but when she refuses Balthasar's advances, she is also deemed a heretic by the corrupt officials, and tortured.

== Cast ==
- Erika Blanc as Elisabeth von Salmenau
- Anton Diffring as Balthasar von Ross
- Percy Hoven as Alexander von Salmenau
- Reggie Nalder as Natas
- Lukas Ammann as Eminence
- Jean-Pierre Zola as Nicholas
- Astrid Kilian as Clementine
- Ellen Umlauf as Abbess
- Rosemarie Heinikel as Pompanne (credited as Rosy Rosy)
- Dietrich Kerky as Father Melchior
- Johannes Buzalski as Advocate
- Adrian Hoven as Count Alexander von Salmenau

== Production ==
Although sold as a sequel, the film has no real connection to the first film outside of a similar time period and instances of gratuitous torture. Reggie Nalder, who played the villain in the first film, co-stars here but plays a different character.

== Release ==
The film was released theatrically in the United States by Hallmark Releasing, distributor of the first film, in 1974. It has been available on VHS in a multitude of releases from different companies, all varying in terms of the violent content, and never been officially released on DVD in the United States.
