= Big Brother (German TV series) season 13 =

Big Brother
- Season 13
- Presented by: Jochen Schropp
- No. of days: 99
- No. of housemates: 18
- Winner: Cedric Beidinger
- Runner-up: Gina Beckmann
- Companion shows: Die Late Night Show; Recap mit Aaron Troschke
- No. of episodes: 85

Release
- Original network: Sat.1
- Original release: 10 February – 18 May 2020

Season chronology
- ← Previous; Season 12 Next → Season 14

Big Brother 2020, also known as Big Brother 13 and known specifically as Big Brother 20, was the thirteenth season of the German reality television series Big Brother. The show returned after a five-year hiatus and began airing on 10 February 2020 on Sat.1 and ended after 99 days on 18 May 2020, twenty years after the first season aired. It was the first regular season and the eighth season of Big Brother in total to air on Sat.1 to date. The host was Jochen Schropp.

Like in Promi Big Brother, sixx aired a live late-night show with the name Die Late Night Show every Monday after The Decision Show. The presenters were Jochen Bendel and Melissa Khalaj, who also hosts the celebrity version of the same show. Special guests joined the presenters duo to analyzing the situation of the show, which also featured exclusive live broadcasts from the houses.

A short-minute web show titled Recap mit Aaron Troschke started on 9 February 2020 and was published every Sunday on IGTV. Aaron Troschke, as the host, commented on the events from the last week.

Cedric Beidinger was announced as the winner of the season, with Gina Beckmann as the runner-up.

Due to the COVID-19 pandemic in Germany, beginning with the sixth live show on Monday, 16 March 2020, and continuing indefinitely, all live shows aired without a studio audience to comply with the German government's quarantine protocols.

== Production ==
=== Presenters ===
On 2 January 2020, it was announced that Jochen Schropp will be presenting The Decision Show, who he has already been hosting the celebrity version since 2014. Later on 11 January 2020, it was announced that Jochen Bendel and Melissa Khalaj, would be taking over the role of hosting the after show Die Late Night Show every Monday on sixx. On 28 January 2020, it was announced that Aaron Troschke will host every Sunday a web show titled Recap mit Aaron Troschke on IGTV.

=== Broadcasting ===
Monday	Tuesday	Wednesday	Thursday	Friday	Saturday	Sunday	Neptunday
Highlights Shows (7:00 pm – 7:55 pm); The Decision Shows (8:15 pm – 10:15 pm); Die Late Night Show (10:15 pm – 12:00 am)	Highlights Shows (7:00 pm – 7:55 pm)				none	none	Recap mit Aaron Troschke (IGTV)

After week 10, The Decision Shows had broadcast for different durations.

=== Cancellation of live feed ===
In the previous seasons, there were featured a 24-hour live feed, in which fans could view inside the Big Brother house at any time, but this season Sat.1 announced that there will be no a 24-hour live feed from the house.

=== Eye logo ===
On 2 January 2020, Sat.1 released a new eye logo, which was in blue and in the middle a little yellow, similar to the seventh season of celebrity version.

=== Theme song ===
The theme song of the show's intro and outro is "Follow the Leader" from the band Cosby.

=== House ===
The official pictures of the new Big Brother house were released on 7 February 2020. In this season, the house features two areas: the Glasshouse and the Blockhouse.

The Glasshouse is a futuristic area. There is 198 m^{2} inside, and 201 m^{2} outside, for a total of 399 m^{2}. It features a well-designed chair, glass lamps, yellow lampshades and a room. Housemates can expect numerous modern life amenities, such as technical devices and supplies of food and other goods as needed. But luxury comes with a price. In the Glasshouse, the housemates are able to see the feedback from the viewers. In Glasshouse, there is a robot lady called "Temi" interact with the housemates.

The Blockhouse is a "Back to Basic" area. There is 90 m^{2} inside, and 175 m^{2} outside, for a total of 265 m^{2}. Housemates have to work for their standard life. Housemates get everything they need to live, such as a basic food package, a simple washing machine, a poor bathroom and a kitchen. They also have to do housework. The housemates of the Blockhouse are not directly confronted with the feedback from the viewers. The house also features a functional area. In the Greenhouse, the eggs of the six chickens in the garden improve the basic food for the housemates. On Day 15, Big Brother closed the Blockhouse moving all housemates into the Glasshouse. Until Day 29, when the house reopened. On Day 78, Big Brother closed again the Blockhouse, all the housemates stayed in Glasshouse. Big Brother didn't open again the Blockhouse.

== Housemates ==
Name	Age on entry	Hometown	Occupation	Day entered	Day exited	Result
Cedric Beidinger	26	Mainz	Security guard	1	99	Winner
Gina Beckmann	19	Würzburg	Waitress	1	99	Runner-up
Pat Müller	30	Uetze	Wedding speaker	1	99	3rd Place
Rebecca Zöller	21	Soest	Student	1	99	4th Place
Philipp Kalisch	30	Düsseldorf	Event manager	1	99	5th Place
Vanessa	26	Flensburg	Technical saleswoman	1	99	6th Place
Tim Heister	21	Aachen	Student	1	92	Evicted
Michelle Redert	26	Bochum	Elderly care nurse	1	85	Evicted
Serkan Yavuz	26	Regensburg	Student	29	72	Walked
Denny Heidrich	32	Königs Wusterhausen	Professional boxer	1	71	Evicted
Romana Hoffmann	40	Vienna, Austria	DJ	29	57	Evicted
Jade Übach	24	Cologne	Influencer	29	50	Evicted
Menowin Fröhlich	32	Hesse	Singer	29	44	Walked
René Carl	44	Bamberg	Kung Fu coach	1	36	Evicted
Cathleen Vogel	38	Schwetzingen	Nurse	1	29	Evicted
Mac Troy	33	Vienna, Austria	Marketing manager	1	23	Walked
Maria Bell	35	Dreieich	Customer consultant	1	15	Evicted
Mareike Müller	37	Maspalomas, Spain	Diving school owner	1	15	Evicted

== Twists ==
=== Rate the Housemates ===
For the first time ever, in this season the viewers can from the Sat.1-App the housemates rate and also can write comments for them.

Usage:

- The viewers can rate each housemate with 1 - 5 stars every day.
- The housemates with the highest value receives immunity.
- The comments are regularly shown to the house, but only to the housemates that are living in the Glasshouse can read the comments.

=== Match arena ===
Like in Promi Big Brother, there is the Match Arena.

Until the second week, the housemates that are living in Blockhouse have to compete in the match and the winner decides if he/she or someone else goes to the Glasshouse.

From week four, all the housemates have to compete in the match. All housemates must win the match to gain more food. However, if they lose, they will only have what they need for the week.

=== Room of Truth ===
On Day 5, the Room of Truth was revealed to the housemates. Each week a housemate will be chosen by the viewers via social media polls to enter the room of truth. Here the selected housemate will have to face comments from the audience as well as other surprises.

== Glasshouse and Blockhouse ==
	Week 1		Week 2	Week 3–4	Week 5	Week 6	Week 7	Week 8	Week 9	Week 10	Week 11		Week 12	Week 13	Week 14
Cedric	Blockhouse			Glasshouse	Blockhouse			Glasshouse							
Gina	Glasshouse					Blockhouse			Glasshouse						
Pat	Blockhouse			Glasshouse					Blockhouse		Glasshouse				
Rebecca	Blockhouse			Glasshouse	Blockhouse		Glasshouse	Blockhouse					Glasshouse		
Philipp	Glasshouse				Blockhouse			Glasshouse	Blockhouse	Glasshouse					
Vanessa	Blockhouse			Glasshouse				Blockhouse			Glasshouse	Blockhouse	Glasshouse		
Tim	Glasshouse	Blockhouse		Glasshouse						Blockhouse			Glasshouse		
Michelle	Glasshouse				Blockhouse	Glasshouse		Blockhouse	Glasshouse		Blockhouse		Glasshouse		
Serkan					Glasshouse						Blockhouse				
Denny	Blockhouse	Glasshouse	Blockhouse	Glasshouse	Blockhouse			Glasshouse	Blockhouse						
Romana					Blockhouse										
Jade					Glasshouse		Blockhouse								
Menowin					Blockhouse										
René	Blockhouse			Glasshouse	Blockhouse										
Cathleen	Glasshouse														
Mac	Glasshouse														
Maria	Glasshouse														
Mareike	Blockhouse		Glasshouse												

=== Weekly summary ===
- On Day 1, during the live launch, the housemates moved in and choose which house they wanted to live in for the first week. Later in the episode, Denny won the first match, he won the power to send someone, including himself, from the Blockhouse to the Glasshouse. He chose himself. Cathleen earned the right to send someone from the Glasshouse to the Blockhouse after it was revealed she was the highest-rated housemate in the Glasshouse. After a short discussion, Tim volunteered to move.
- On Day 8, Cedric won the match and the power to choose one Blockhouse housemate to move into the Glasshouse. Cedric chose Mareike to move into the Glasshouse. It was revealed that Denny received the highest-ranking, and had the power to send one housemate to the Blockhouse. He chose himself to move.
- On Day 15, Big Brother closed the Blockhouse and all housemates stayed together at the Glasshouse until further notice.
- On Day 25, Big Brother let Pat and Tim entered Blockhouse for only one night for a secret mission. They had to clean the house without being heard by the housemates in the Glasshouse. The other housemates didn't know about it.
- On Day 29, Big Brother reopened the Blockhouse. Menowin and Romana as the two new housemates decide which three housemates they want to come with them to the Blockhouse.
- On Day 36, René won the match and the power to choose one Blockhouse housemate to move into the Glasshouse. René chose Michelle to move into the Glasshouse. It was revealed that Pat received the highest-ranking, and had the power to send one housemate to the Blockhouse. He chose Gina to move.
- On Day 43, it was revealed that Pat received the highest-ranking, and had the power to send one housemate from the Glasshouse to the Blockhouse and one housemate from the Blockhouse to the Glasshouse. From the Glasshouse choose Jade and from the Blockhouse choose Rebecca.
- On Day 50, Big Brother decided to split the two houses into boys and girls. Pat received the highest-ranking and had the power to decide which house he wants the boys to move in. He chose the boys to move into the Glasshouse and the girls move to the Blockhouse.
- On Day 57, during The Decision Shows, it was revealed that Gina was the highest-rated housemate and she had to decide in which house she wants to live, she chose the Glasshouse. Then she and Pat, as he was the second with the highest-rated housemate, they had to decide which housemates wanted to live with them.
- On Day 64, it was revealed that Gina received the highest-ranking, and had the power to send one housemate from the Glasshouse to the Blockhouse and one housemate from the Blockhouse to the Glasshouse. From the Glasshouse choose Tim and from the Blockhouse choose Denny.
- On Day 71, it was revealed that Gina received the highest-ranking, and had the power to send two housemates from the Glasshouse to the Blockhouse and two housemates from the Blockhouse to the Glasshouse. From the Glasshouse choose Michelle and Serkan and from the Blockhouse choose Pat and Vanessa. On Day 72, Serkan decided to leave the house and then Big Brother announced that Vanessa will switch from the Glasshouse to the Blockhouse.
- On Day 78, Big Brother closed again the Blockhouse. All the housemates stayed together at the Glasshouse.
- The last two weeks, Big Brother reopened the Blockhouse for the housemates to do weekly tasks, but the house was opened only for the tasks, the housemates couldn't stay there.

== Match arena ==
=== House moves ===
The Blockhouse housemates could participate in the match. In the match, the Blockhouse housemates compete against each other. The winner of the match can decide whether he or she moves to the Glasshouse or sends the other fellow housemate.

Match number	Airdate	Participation	Winner	Results
1	10 February	Cedric; Denny; Mareike; Pat; Rebecca; René; Vanessa	Denny	Denny chose himself to move to the Glasshouse.
2	17 February	Cedric; Mareike; Pat; Rebecca; René; Tim; Vanessa	Cedric	Cedric chose Mareike to move to the Glasshouse.
3	16 March	Cedric; Denny; Menowin; Michelle; Philipp; Rebecca; René; Romana	René	René chose Michelle to move to the Glasshouse.

=== Shopping budget ===
==== Weekly task ====
The Blockhouse housemates had to do a weekly task for their shopping budget.

Week 1	On Day 8, it was revealed the housemates completed the first part of their shopping task successfully, which was to build a firewood box all week. The second part of the shopping task was played live, where three housemates: Rene, Cedric, and Vanessa had 30 minutes to chop wood to fill the firebox. The housemates failed to chop all the wood in 30 minutes, and only earned 50% of the shopping budget, €150 for the week.
Week 2	On Day 9, Blockhouse housemates received their weekly task. Housemates must create their own soap with the materials provided. Big Brother has set several soaps they need to make which will be revealed at the end of the week.; On Day 14, Housemates earned only half of their budget after failing to follow the recipes provided to make the cosmetic products.
Week 5	On Day 30, in the Blockhouse it was revealed to the housemates the weekly task. They had to hold a big Egg, with only one hand for the whole day. They won the task for €100.; The second weekly task was Menowin had to lose pounds. He lost 6 Kilos. The housemates won candies and chocolates.
Week 6	The Blockhouse housemates had to milk a cow. They lost the Weekly Task.; Menowin continued to lose pounds so that all the housemates in the Blockhouse can eat sweet. He lost 3 Kilos.
Week 7	Romana was the Chef and the other housemates have to do what the chef is telling. They won the Weekly Task.
Week 8	This week, Big Brother put the Blockhouse (girls) against the Glasshouse (boys). The housemates had to sew 27 flags. They had also to do some games. The Boys won the Weekly Task.
Week 10	On week 10, the Blockhouse had to copy scenes from the reality show on Sat.1 Promis unter Palmen. The housemates won the task.

==== Match task ====
After the fourth week, all the housemates participate in a live match in The Decision Show for their shopping budget.

The housemates won the match.
The housemates lost the match.

Match number	Airdate	Participation
1	2 March	All housemates
2	9 March	Cedric; Denny; Menowin; Michelle; Philipp; Rebecca; René; Romana
3	6 April	Pat
4	13 April	Denny; Pat; Philipp; Rebecca; Vanessa

== Rating table ==
Ratings of housemates were revealed during the live show on Mondays. Starting from the second week, the housemate with the highest rating would receive protection from being nominated for eviction. In the fourth week, Big Brother didn't reveal the ratings each housemate received, only their rankings. In the fourteenth week, Big Brother didn't reveal the ratings each housemate received again, only the housemate that was in the first place. There was no rating in the final week.

Housemates in the Glasshouse at the time of reveal.
Housemates in the Blockhouse at the time of reveal.

	Week 1	Week 2	Week 3	Week 4	Week 5	Week 6	Week 7	Week 8	Week 9	Week 10	Week 11	Week 12	Week 13	Week 14
Cedric	2.6	N/A	3.7	4th	3.7	N/A	3.6	N/A	3.3	3.5	3.3	2.5	3.2	N/A
Gina	2.6	2.7	3.0	8th	3.3	3.2	3.3	N/A	3.8	3.7	3.9	3.9	3.8	1st
Pat	3.3	N/A	3.8	3rd	3.6	3.8	3.8	3.7	3.6	3.3	N/A	3.4	3.3	N/A
Rebecca	3.5	N/A	4.0	1st	3.1	N/A	3.0	3.0	3.0	3.1	N/A	3.0	2.7	N/A
Philipp	3.3	3.1	3.0	11th	2.8	N/A	3.0	N/A	3.3	3.1	2.8	3.1	2.9	N/A
Vanessa	3.2	N/A	3.5	6th	3.3	3.2	3.2	3.2	2.9	2.2	N/A	2.9	2.8	N/A
Tim	2.4	N/A	3.5	2nd	3.5	3.5	3.3	3.1	3.1	3.0	N/A	3.3	2.9	N/A
Michelle	3.5	3.0	2.3	12th	2.9	N/A	3.0	3.1	2.8	2.2	2.4	2.6	2.5	
Serkan						3.1	3.3	3.6	3.6	3.4	3.0			
Denny	3.1	3.7	3.5	5th	3.6	N/A	3.7	N/A	3.5	3.2	N/A			
Romana						N/A	1.7	N/A	1.7					
Jade						2.0	1.8							
Menowin						N/A	2.9							
René	2.8	N/A	3.7	7th	2.9	N/A								
Cathleen	3.5	2.8	2.6	10th	3.2									
Mac	2.7	2.7	2.9	9th										
Maria	3.0	2.7												
Mareike	2.7	N/A												

== Nominations table ==
	Week 2		Week 4	Week 5	Week 7	Week 8	Week 10	Week 11	Week 12	Week 13	Week 14 Final		Nominations received
	Day 8	Day 15	Week 4	Week 5	Week 7	Week 8	Week 10	Week 11	Week 12	Week 13	Week 14 Final		Nominations received
Cedric	Mareike	No; Nominations	Tim	Gina	Rebecca	Romana	Denny	No; Nominations	Michelle (x2)	Nominated	Winner (Day 99)		19
Gina	Mac	No; Nominations	Cedric	René	Romana	Romana	Denny	No; Nominations	Cedric	Nominated	Runner-up (Day 99)		7
Pat	Cathleen	No; Nominations	Mac	René	Jade	Romana	Serkan; Denny	No; Nominations	Michelle (x3)	Nominated	Third place (Day 99)		1
Rebecca	Cathleen	No; Nominations	Cedric	René	Cedric	Cedric	Cedric; Denny	No; Nominations	Michelle	Exempt	Fourth place (Day 99)		3
Philipp	Cathleen	No; Nominations	Denny	René	Denny	Romana	Cedric; Denny	No; Nominations	Tim	Nominated	Fifth place (Day 99)		2
Vanessa	Mareike	No; Nominations	René	René	Jade	Romana	Cedric; Serkan	No; Nominations	Cedric	Nominated	Sixth place (Day 99)		3
Tim	Cedric	No; Nominations	Denny	René	Jade	Cedric	Philipp	No; Nominations	Cedric (x4)	Nominated	Evicted (Day 92)		2
Michelle	Mac	No; Nominations	Denny	René	Jade	Cedric	Denny	No; Nominations	Cedric	Evicted (Day 85)			9
Serkan	Not in House			René	Jade	Romana	Pat	No; Nominations	Walked (Day 72)				3
Denny	Michelle	No; Nominations	Gina	Gina	Rebecca	Romana	Cedric; Serkan	Evicted (Day 71)					10
Romana	Not in House			Vanessa	Gina	Gina	Evicted (Day 57)						8
Jade	Not in House			René	Michelle	Evicted (Day 50)							5
Menowin	Not in House			Vanessa	Rebecca	Walked (Day 44)							0
René	Gina	No; Nominations	Mac	Gina	Evicted (Day 36)								11
Cathleen	Philipp	No; Nominations	Vanessa	Evicted (Day 29)									3
Mac	Michelle	No; Nominations	René	Walked (Day 23)									4
Maria	Mareike	No; Nominations	Evicted (Day 15)										0
Mareike	Cedric	Evicted (Day 15)											3
Notes	1	2	3, 4	5	6, 7	8	9, 10	11	12	13, 14	15		
Against public vote	Cathleen, Mareike	All; Housemates	Cathleen, Denny, Michelle, Philipp	All; Housemates	Jade, Rebecca	Cedric, Romana	Cedric, Denny	none	Cedric, Michelle	Cedric, Gina, Pat, Philipp, Tim, Vanessa	Cedric, Gina, Pat, Philipp, Rebecca, Vanessa		
Walked	none		Mac	none	Menowin	none		Serkan	none				
Evicted	Mareike; Fewest votes to save	Maria; Fewest votes to save	Cathleen; Fewest votes to save	René; 9 of 14 votes to evict	Jade; Fewest votes to save	Romana; Fewest votes to save	Denny; 45.77% to save	No; Eviction	Michelle; 41.44% to save	Tim; 55.96% to evict	Vanessa; Fewest votes (out of 6)	Philipp; Fewest votes (out of 5)	
Evicted	Mareike; Fewest votes to save	Maria; Fewest votes to save	Cathleen; Fewest votes to save	René; 9 of 14 votes to evict	Jade; Fewest votes to save	Romana; Fewest votes to save	Denny; 45.77% to save	No; Eviction	Michelle; 41.44% to save	Tim; 55.96% to evict	Rebecca; Fewest votes (out of 4)	Pat; Fewest votes (out of 3)	
Evicted	Mareike; Fewest votes to save	Maria; Fewest votes to save	Cathleen; Fewest votes to save	René; 9 of 14 votes to evict	Jade; Fewest votes to save	Romana; Fewest votes to save	Denny; 45.77% to save	No; Eviction	Michelle; 41.44% to save	Tim; 55.96% to evict	Gina; Fewest votes (out of 2)	Cedric; Most votes to win	

=== Notes ===
- ^Note 1: On Day 8, during The Decision Shows, it was revealed that Denny was the highest-rated housemate on the Glasshouse, he received a protection from this week's nomination.
- ^Note 2: In a double eviction night, all housemates were nominated for the second round. The one with the fewest votes was evicted.
- ^Note 3: Michelle, Philipp and Cathleen had the lowest rating and were automatically against the public vote.
- ^Note 4: On Day 22, during The Decision Shows, it was revealed that Rebecca was the highest-rated housemate, she received protection from this week's nomination.
- ^Note 5: On Day 36, during The Decision Show, the viewers were given the power to determine which housemates are nominated for the eviction. Three housemates with the fewest votes were nominated, they were Gina, René and Vanessa. The remaining housemates decide which one of them will be evicted. With nine votes to evict, René was evicted.
- ^Note 6: On Day 43, during The Decision Shows, it was revealed that Pat was the highest-rated housemate from the Glasshouse, he received protection from this week's nomination.
- ^Note 7: The housemates had to nominate from their house where they are living.
- ^Note 8: Two houses played a match against each other and the winner-house received protection from this week's nomination. The Glasshouse won with 34 points against the Blockhouse with 28 points.
- ^Note 9: This week only the boys can be nominated. The girls received from Big Brother protection from this week's nomination.
- ^Note 10: On Week 9, the two houses had to do a weekly task. As the Blockhouse won the task, they had two votes.
- ^Note 11: The whole 10th week, all the housemates played games to have the chance to win the Golden Final Ticket, a pass to the final, granting him/her immunity from every eviction of the series and therefore could not be nominated by the fellow housemates. The housemates played in five pairs and the five winners from the weekly games, played again in The Decision Shows in the match arena and there the first finalist will be decided. Tim, Philipp, Michelle, Denny and Rebecca won the other housemates and played again on Monday. Rebecca won the Golden Final Ticket.
- ^Note 12: On Week 11, the housemates played weekly tasks against the other housemates, in their house and the winner will receive protection from this week's nomination. The two winners from the weekly tasks were Philipp from the Glasshouse and Michelle from the Blockhouse. They played again on Monday in The Decision Shows. Philipp won the Match Task. In another task, the non-immuned housemates played for another advantage. Tim won and his vote counts quadruple, Pat came 2nd and his vote counts triple, Cedric came 3rd and his vote counts double.
- ^Note 13: All the housemates faced the public votes because of violating the rules. Rebecca had protection from this week's nomination because she had the Golden Final Ticket. At first Gina, Pat and Philipp were saved afterwards Vanessa. The final voting round was between Cedric and Tim.
- ^Note 14: The public voted to evict rather than to save.
- ^Note 15: The public voted to win rather than to save or to evict.

== Ratings ==
Blue-coloured boxes denote live shows.

Week	Episode	Date	Timeslot (EET)	Viewers (in millions)	Share (in %)
1	1	10 February 2020	Monday to Friday; 07:00 p.m. Monday; 08:15 p.m.	1.60	11.0
1	2	11 February 2020	Monday to Friday; 07:00 p.m. Monday; 08:15 p.m.	1.02	7.7
1	3	12 February 2020	Monday to Friday; 07:00 p.m. Monday; 08:15 p.m.	0.92	7.2
1	4	13 February 2020	Monday to Friday; 07:00 p.m. Monday; 08:15 p.m.	0.94	7.3
1	5	14 February 2020	Monday to Friday; 07:00 p.m. Monday; 08:15 p.m.	0.90	7.7
2	6	17 February 2020	Monday to Friday; 07:00 p.m. Monday; 08:15 p.m.	0.85	6.1
2	7	17 February 2020	Monday to Friday; 07:00 p.m. Monday; 08:15 p.m.	1.21	7.3
2	8	18 February 2020	Monday to Friday; 07:00 p.m. Monday; 08:15 p.m.	0.95	6.4
2	9	19 February 2020	Monday to Friday; 07:00 p.m. Monday; 08:15 p.m.	0.97	7.5
2	10	20 February 2020	Monday to Friday; 07:00 p.m. Monday; 08:15 p.m.	0.86	6.1
2	11	21 February 2020	Monday to Friday; 07:00 p.m. Monday; 08:15 p.m.	0.74	5.7
3	12	24 February 2020	Monday to Friday; 07:00 p.m. Monday; 08:15 p.m.	0.78	5.4
3	13	24 February 2020	Monday to Friday; 07:00 p.m. Monday; 08:15 p.m.	1.12	6.2
3	14	25 February 2020	Monday to Friday; 07:00 p.m. Monday; 08:15 p.m.	0.98	6.9
3	15	26 February 2020	Monday to Friday; 07:00 p.m. Monday; 08:15 p.m.	0.87	6.6
3	16	27 February 2020	Monday to Friday; 07:00 p.m. Monday; 08:15 p.m.	0.87	6.7
3	17	28 February 2020	Monday to Friday; 07:00 p.m. Monday; 08:15 p.m.	0.80	6.1
4	18	2 March 2020	Monday to Friday; 07:00 p.m. Monday; 08:15 p.m.	0.77	5.2
4	19	2 March 2020	Monday to Friday; 07:00 p.m. Monday; 08:15 p.m.	0.96	5.2
4	20	3 March 2020	Monday to Friday; 07:00 p.m. Monday; 08:15 p.m.	0.92	6.7
4	21	4 March 2020	Monday to Friday; 07:00 p.m. Monday; 08:15 p.m.	0.83	4.8
4	22	5 March 2020	Monday to Friday; 07:00 p.m. Monday; 08:15 p.m.	0.78	5.0
4	23	6 March 2020	Monday to Friday; 07:00 p.m. Monday; 08:15 p.m.	0.79	5.6
5	24	9 March 2020	Monday to Friday; 07:00 p.m. Monday; 08:15 p.m.	0.82	6.2
5	25	9 March 2020	Monday to Friday; 07:00 p.m. Monday; 08:15 p.m.	1.17	6.9
5	26	10 March 2020	Monday to Friday; 07:00 p.m. Monday; 08:15 p.m.	0.87	6.8
5	27	11 March 2020	Monday to Friday; 07:00 p.m. Monday; 08:15 p.m.	0.80	5.7
5	28	12 March 2020	Monday to Friday; 07:00 p.m. Monday; 08:15 p.m.	0.73	4.9
5	29	13 March 2020	Monday to Friday; 07:00 p.m. Monday; 08:15 p.m.	0.81	5.0
6	30	16 March 2020	Monday to Friday; 07:00 p.m. Monday; 08:15 p.m.	0.82	5.0
6	31	16 March 2020	Monday to Friday; 07:00 p.m. Monday; 08:15 p.m.	1.20	6.5
6	32 (Note: A special live episode was aired on 17 March 2020, where the host Jochen Schropp and the doctor of Big Brother - Dr. Andreas Kaniewski, went into the house to tell the housemates about the impact of coronavirus pandemic in Germany and Europe.)	17 March 2020	Monday to Friday; 07:00 p.m. Monday; 08:15 p.m.	1.09	6.8
6	33	18 March 2020	Monday to Friday; 07:00 p.m. Monday; 08:15 p.m.	0.83	3.9
6	34	19 March 2020	Monday to Friday; 07:00 p.m. Monday; 08:15 p.m.	0.89	5.0
6	35	20 March 2020	Monday to Friday; 07:00 p.m. Monday; 08:15 p.m.	0.99	5.4
7	36	23 March 2020	Monday to Friday; 07:00 p.m. Monday; 08:15 p.m.	0.92	4.8
7	37	23 March 2020	Monday to Friday; 07:00 p.m. Monday; 08:15 p.m.	1.22	6.2
7	38	24 March 2020	Monday to Friday; 07:00 p.m. Monday; 08:15 p.m.	0.96	6.4
7	39	25 March 2020	Monday to Friday; 07:00 p.m. Monday; 08:15 p.m.	0.90	5.3
7	40	26 March 2020	Monday to Friday; 07:00 p.m. Monday; 08:15 p.m.	0.86	5.1
7	41	27 March 2020	Monday to Friday; 07:00 p.m. Monday; 08:15 p.m.	0.79	4.2
8	42	30 March 2020	Monday to Friday; 07:00 p.m. Monday; 08:15 p.m.	0.84	5.6
8	43	30 March 2020	Monday to Friday; 07:00 p.m. Monday; 08:15 p.m.	1.10	5.2
8	44	31 March 2020	Monday to Friday; 07:00 p.m. Monday; 08:15 p.m.	0.77	4.7
8	45	1 April 2020	Monday to Friday; 07:00 p.m. Monday; 08:15 p.m.	0.92	5.8
8	46	2 April 2020	Monday to Friday; 07:00 p.m. Monday; 08:15 p.m.	0.82	5.5
8	47	3 April 2020	Monday to Friday; 07:00 p.m. Monday; 08:15 p.m.	0.83	5.0
9	48	6 April 2020	Monday to Friday; 07:00 p.m. Monday; 08:15 p.m.	0.83	5.4
9	49	6 April 2020	Monday to Friday; 07:00 p.m. Monday; 08:15 p.m.	1.24	6.1
9	50	7 April 2020	Monday to Friday; 07:00 p.m. Monday; 08:15 p.m.	0.91	5.7
9	51	8 April 2020	Monday to Friday; 07:00 p.m. Monday; 08:15 p.m.	0.99	7.0
9	52	9 April 2020	Monday to Friday; 07:00 p.m. Monday; 08:15 p.m.	0.94	6.7
9	53	10 April 2020	Friday; 10:45 p.m.	1.12	8.9
10	54	13 April 2020	Monday; 10:15 p.m.	0.99	6.2
10	55	14 April 2020	Tuesday; 03:30 a.m.	0.17	7.3
10	56	14 April 2020	Tuesday to Friday; 07:00 p.m.	0.85	4.5
10	57	15 April 2020	Tuesday to Friday; 07:00 p.m.	0.88	5.4
10	58	16 April 2020	Tuesday to Friday; 07:00 p.m.	0.81	5.6
10	59	17 April 2020	Tuesday to Friday; 07:00 p.m.	0.87	5.8
11	60	20 April 2020	Monday to Friday; 07:00 p.m. Monday; 10:15 p.m.	0.72	4.0
11	61	20 April 2020	Monday to Friday; 07:00 p.m. Monday; 10:15 p.m.	0.76	5.5
11	62	21 April 2020	Monday to Friday; 07:00 p.m. Monday; 10:15 p.m.	0.85	6.2
11	63	22 April 2020	Monday to Friday; 07:00 p.m. Monday; 10:15 p.m.	0.98	7.2
11	64	23 April 2020	Monday to Friday; 07:00 p.m. Monday; 10:15 p.m.	0.83	5.6
11	65	24 April 2020	Monday to Friday; 07:00 p.m. Monday; 10:15 p.m.	0.84	6.0
12	66	27 April 2020	Monday to Friday; 07:00 p.m. Monday; 09:45 p.m.	0.81	5.7
12	67	27 April 2020	Monday to Friday; 07:00 p.m. Monday; 09:45 p.m.	0.84	5.2
12	68	28 April 2020	Monday to Friday; 07:00 p.m. Monday; 09:45 p.m.	0.82	4.4
12	69	29 April 2020	Monday to Friday; 07:00 p.m. Monday; 09:45 p.m.	0.87	5.5
12	70	30 April 2020	Monday to Friday; 07:00 p.m. Monday; 09:45 p.m.	0.77	4.9
12	71	1 May 2020	Monday to Friday; 07:00 p.m. Monday; 09:45 p.m.	0.73	4.8
13	72	4 May 2020	Monday to Friday; 07:00 p.m. Monday; 09:55 p.m.	0.86	5.5
13	73	4 May 2020	Monday to Friday; 07:00 p.m. Monday; 09:55 p.m.	0.85	5.9
13	74	5 May 2020	Monday to Friday; 07:00 p.m. Monday; 09:55 p.m.	0.80	6.4
13	75	6 May 2020	Monday to Friday; 07:00 p.m. Monday; 09:55 p.m.	0.82	5.4
13	76	7 May 2020	Monday to Friday; 07:00 p.m. Monday; 09:55 p.m.	0.82	5.8
13	77	8 May 2020	Monday to Friday; 07:00 p.m. Monday; 09:55 p.m.	0.80	4.8
14	78	11 May 2020	Monday to Friday; 07:00 p.m. Monday; 09:50 p.m.	0.94	6.5
14	79	11 May 2020	Monday to Friday; 07:00 p.m. Monday; 09:50 p.m.	0.70	4.6
14	80	12 May 2020	Monday to Friday; 07:00 p.m. Monday; 09:50 p.m.	0.89	5.9
14	81	13 May 2020	Monday to Friday; 07:00 p.m. Monday; 09:50 p.m.	0.89	5.9
14	82	14 May 2020	Monday to Friday; 07:00 p.m. Monday; 09:50 p.m.	0.77	5.3
14	83	15 May 2020	Monday to Friday; 07:00 p.m. Monday; 09:50 p.m.	0.73	5.5
15	84	18 May 2020	Monday; 07:00 p.m.	0.90	7.5
15	85	18 May 2020	Monday; 10:00 p.m.	0.86	5.7
Season average				0.89	5.91
