= Big Brother (German TV series) season 3 =

Big Brother
- Season 3
- Presented by: Oliver Geissen
- No. of days: 106
- No. of housemates: 14
- Winner: Karina Schreiber
- Runner-up: Medy Hussein
- No. of episodes: 108

Release
- Original network: RTL Zwei
- Original release: 27 January – 12 May 2001

Season chronology
- ← Previous; Season 2 Next → Season 4

Season three of Big Brother Germany lasted from 27 January 2001 to 12 May 2001 and was aired on RTL and RTL Zwei.

== Season summary ==
After a very successful second season, the producers did not hesitate to start the third installment of the show during an already-scarce month after the end of the second season. The basic format of the show was maintained; however, the producers introduced three twists in hope of keeping the excitement up. The first was that Coco and Katja, a dating couple, entered the house together, marking the first time that two housemates knew each other before the show (though several contestants met at auditions in former seasons). The second was that every housemate had now three nomination points to give out: two for the least liked and one for the second-least liked person in the house. The same changes were made to the viewer's nominations. The third and largest twist, however, was announced only after the twelve original housemates entered the house on launch night: it was revealed that trained actress Silvia was a mole working for Big Brother. As a result of the heavy number of voluntary exits during season 2, the contestants had to pay a deposit before entering the house and would receive 1.000 euro per week in their stay in the house. However, they would only get the deposit and the money they earned when they get evicted.

Due to the lack of diversity and conflicts between the housemates, who had mostly been considered "boring" and "dull" by audiences, the producers decided to make an offer of 100.000 DM to the person that would voluntary walk on the same night. After almost all the housemates wanted to take the offer, Anja walked away with the money. On the same night Big Brother revealed that there would be a mole in the house left it to everyone's speculation who that person was. Some days later Big Brother asked the Mole to reveal her identity to the other housemates and to leave the house afterwards. As replacements for Anja and Silvia, blonde bombshell Ana-Marija and Thomas, who was sitting in a wheelchair and was chosen by the viewers to move in, entered the house with none of them having any huge impact on the show either.

After 106 Days, Karina Schreiber won the season, just like the first two winners John Milz and Alida Kurras, Schreiber was raised in the GDR and was considered as the nicest person in the house and was never nominated.

The third season was a huge disappointment in terms of ratings and entertainment and saw the show being off the screen for more than two years with RTL never airing a Big Brother show anymore.

== Housemates ==
Name	Age on entry	Hometown	Day entered	Day exited	Result
Karina Schreiber	26	Erfurt	1	106	Winner
Medy Hussein	36	Berlin	1	106	Runner-up
Wulf Piazolo	26	Freiburg	1	106	3rd Place
Tajana Dietrich	28	Bregenz, Austria	1	104	Evicted
Cornelius "Coco" Schmitz	25	Essen	1	102	Evicted
Thomas Hoffmarck	34	Lünen	57	99	Evicted
Katja Frase	24	Essen	1	85	Evicted
Ana-Marija Sokolović	27	Stuttgart	50	71	Evicted
Huy Hoang Nguyen	24	Hattingen	1	57	Evicted
Silvia Leder	29	Vienna, Austria	1	50	Mole
Anja Kerwer	27	Bottrop	1	46	Walked
Michael Nagel	23	Cologne	1	43	Evicted
Jörg Heidt	32	Bremerhaven	1	29	Evicted
Nicole Bartsch	25	Duisburg	1	15	Evicted

== Nominations table ==
	Week 2	Week 4	Week 6	Week 8	Week 10	Week 12	Week 14	Week 15 Final			Nomination points received
Karina	Jörg; Nicole	Jörg; Medy	Tajana; Wulf	Wulf; Tajana	Thomas; Ana-Marija	Katja; Wulf	Wulf; Thomas	No nominations	Winner (Day 106)		10
Medy	Huy; Karina	Anja; Huy	Anja; Huy	Huy; Tajana	Ana-Marija; Thomas	Thomas; Karina	Tajana; Karina	No nominations	Runner-up (Day 106)		8
Wulf	Michael; Silvia	Michael; Silvia	Michael; Medy	Huy; Karina	Ana-Marija; Karina	Thomas; Karina	Thomas; Karina	No nominations	Third place (Day 106)		14
Tajana	Jörg; Nicole	Huy; Karina	Michael; Huy	Huy; Wulf	Thomas; Coco	Medy; Wulf	Medy; Coco	No nominations	Evicted (Day 104)		22
Coco	Michael; Jörg	Jörg; Michael	Silvia; Tajana	Wulf; Karina	Ana-Marija; Thomas	Thomas; Tajana	Thomas; Tajana	No nominations	Evicted (Day 102)		4
Thomas	Not in House				Ana-Marija; Tajana	Tajana; Wulf	Tajana; Wulf	Evicted (Day 99)			25
Katja	Jörg; Michael	Jörg; Michael	Michael; Tajana	Huy; Medy	Ana-Marija; Thomas	Thomas; Karina	Evicted (Day 85)				14
Ana-Marija	Not in House				Thomas; Katja	Evicted (Day 71)					11
Huy	Nicole; Medy	Jörg; Tajana	Tajana; Wulf	Katja; Tajana	Evicted (Day 57)						16
Silvia	Nicole; Wulf	Katja; Michael	Anja; Michael	Walked (Day 50)							15
Anja	Jörg; Nicole	Jörg; Silvia	Silvia; Tajana	Walked (Day 46)							11
Michael	Silvia; Jörg	Silvia; Jörg	Silvia; Katja	Evicted (Day 43)							24
Jörg	Anja; Huy	Anja; Michael	Evicted (Day 29)								22
Nicole	Silvia; Tajana	Evicted (Day 15)									8
Public nominations	Michael; 49.58% Nicole; 11.80%	Michael; 34.12% Jörg; 12.89%	Michael; 33.69% Anja; 31.29%	Katja; 57.55% Tajana; 8.89%	Katja; 63.09% Coco; 8.81%	Katja; 61.18% Thomas; 19.00%	Thomas; Coco	none			
Nominated	Jörg, Nicole	Jörg, Michael	Michael, Tajana	Huy, Wulf	Ana-Marija, Thomas	Thomas, Katja	Thomas, Tajana	Coco, Karina, Medy, Tajana, Wulf	Medy, Karina, Wulf		
Walked	none			Anja, Silvia	none						
Evicted	Nicole; 70.93% to evict	Jörg; 50.46% to evict	Michael; 64.55% to evict	Huy; 62.22% to evict	Ana-Marija; 51.36% to evict	Katja; 75.90% to evict	Thomas; 78.89% to evict	Coco; 47% (out of 5) to evict	Wulf; Fewest votes (out of 3)	Medy; 44.84% (out of 2)	
Evicted	Nicole; 70.93% to evict	Jörg; 50.46% to evict	Michael; 64.55% to evict	Huy; 62.22% to evict	Ana-Marija; 51.36% to evict	Katja; 75.90% to evict	Thomas; 78.89% to evict	Tajana; 31% (out of 4) to evict	Karina; 55.16% to win		

== See also ==
- Main Article about the show
