= Big Brother (German TV series) season 2 =

Big Brother
- Season 2
- Presented by: Oliver Geissen
- No. of days: 106
- No. of housemates: 17
- Winner: Alida Kurras
- Runner-up: Harry Schmidt
- No. of episodes: 112

Release
- Original network: RTL Zwei
- Original release: 16 September – 30 December 2000

Season chronology
- ← Previous; Season 1 Next → Season 3

Season two of Big Brother Germany ran from 16 September 2000 to 31 December 2000 and was shown on RTL Zwei.

== Season summary ==
After the runaway success of the first season, expectations were very high for the sophomore season. Significant changes were that the producers dared to air the nominations and eviction shows on RTL and gave it the prime slot at 8.15 pm Saturday evening. Oliver Geissen and Aleks Bechtel replaced the less known Percy Hoven and Sophie Rosentreter as hosts of the show and an additional format called Family and Friends was introduced being aired one day after the last nomination–eviction on Sunday afternoon. Daily recaps remained to be aired on RTL 2 but due to the heavy number of voluntary exits and replace entries several live specials were aired during the week, often only announced to be aired on the very same day.

Another novelty was that the viewers got the chance to watch the housemates 24/7 a week on pay-TV station Single TV.

The number of original housemates was put up from 10 to 12 and the show was extended to 106 days. Also, the audience got the chance to vote for their least favorite housemate during the week of nominations, giving the person with the most votes one nomination point. Thanks to the number of applicants from season one increasing almost ten times, the cast was much more diverse than in season one which resulted in several arguments and misunderstandings between the housemates.

The most controversial character of the season was undoubtedly Christian Möllmann, who went on to become the most hated housemate after the launch show thanks to his chauvinist behaviour on his entry and in his audition tape. No wonder he was nominated by all his fellow housemates and the viewers on the first nomination; however as a reversal of fortunes he was able to turn things to this favor with accusing fellow housemate Stefanie Juhrke, a doctor, to be a bully and talking down to people. He survived his first nomination and won the second vote against Juhrke by a landside (Juhrke received 91.2% of the votes to evict). However, he eventually left the house just three days after Juhrke's departure and proved that he was not as tough as he pretended to be. Just like several contestants of season one, Möllmann recorded a single called "Es ist geil ein Arschloch zu sein" (English: It's Cool to Be an Asshole") which went straight to number one on German single charts. He became a co-host of Big Brother Germany's season 5 and 6 and was the main host of an Endemol-franchised BB clone named Der Container Exklusive which was aired on pay TV only.

The relationship of Daniela and Karim caused controversy not only because both have been in a relationship with other partners outside, but also Karim's family being strict Muslims and he was even forbidden to show up naked on screen. Against all odds, Daniela and Karim remained a couple and married months after their voluntary exit which was featured on the show as well and are still together as of now.

After several unplanned exits and additional entries (first evictee Marion was voted back into the house only to walk three weeks later again), Alida Kurras was crowned the winner of the season showing similar behaviour to first season's winner John Milz; not only were both born and raised in the former GDR but also kept quiet and very friendly towards everyone in the house. Kurras recorded a single which did not result in any success and hosted several low-profile shows on German call-in station 9Live. She went on to marry the channel's director and is still daily onscreen. She became co-host of Big Brother Germany's season 9. Next to Kurras and Möllman, runner-up Harry Schmidt and Walter Unterweger recorded singles and played roles on German TV series.

== Housemates ==
Name	Age on entry	Hometown	Day entered	Day exited	Result
Alida Kurras	23	Eichwalde	1	106	Winner
Harry Schmidt	40	Flensburg	1	106	Runner-up
Frank Röthen	28	Luxembourg City, Luxembourg	1	106	3rd Place
Alex Melchior	26	Gerlingen	63	104	Evicted
Ebru Kayman	23	Mülheim	1	102	Evicted
Linda Traber	29	Dorsten	63	98	Evicted
Lillian Khadrawi	23	Ottweiler	63	84	Evicted
Walter Unterweger	23	Klagenfurt, Austria	1	70	Evicted
Daniela Benguerich	31	Nuremberg	1	63	Walked
Karim Benguerich	28	Frankfurt am Main	1	63	Walked
Marion Unseld	28	Stuttgart	1	14	Evicted
Marion Unseld	28	Stuttgart	38	59	Walked
Hanka Rackwitz	31	Dresden	1	56	Evicted
Christian "Biwi" Mittermeier	37	Landshut	31	42	Evicted
Jörg Thomas Schulz	31	Dresden	1	38	Walked
Céline Jentzsch	31	Cologne	31	35	Evicted
Christian Möllmann	28	Herne	1	31	Walked
Stefanie Jurke	33	Cologne	1	28	Evicted

== Nominations table ==
	Week 2	Week 4	Week 5	Week 6	Week 8	Week 10	Week 12	Week 14	Week 15 Final			Nominations received
Alida	Christian, Marion	Christian, Stefanie	Biwi	Biwi, Walter	Daniela, Marion	Harry, Walter	Alex, Lilian	Alex, Linda	No nominations	Winner (Day 106)		0
Harry	Christian, Marion	Stefanie, Walter	Biwi	Jörg, Walter	Hanka, Walter	Frank, Walter	Lillian, Ebru	Alex, Linda	No nominations	Runner-up (Day 106)		6
Frank	Christian, Marion	Christian, Stefanie	Biwi	Biwi, Hanka	Ebru, Marion	Harry, Walter	Lillian, Linda	Alex, Linda	No nominations	Third place (Day 106)		10
Alex	Not in House						Harry, Linda	Frank, Linda	No nominations	Evicted (Day 104)		8
Ebru	Christian, Marion	Frank, Stefanie	Biwi	Biwi, Jörg	Daniela, Hanka	Frank, Harry	Alex, Linda	Alex, Linda	No nominations	Evicted (Day 102)		5
Linda	Not in House						Alex, Lillian	Alex, Frank	Evicted (Day 98)			8
Lillian	Not in House						Frank, Harry	Evicted (Day 84)				3
Walter	Christian, Daniela	Christian, Karim	Biwi	Biwi, Daniela	Daniela, Hanka	Frank, Harry	Evicted (Day 70)					15
Daniela	Frank, Walter	Stefanie, Walter	Biwi	Biwi, Jörg	Marion, Walter	Walked (Day 63)						6
Karim	Christian, Marion	Stefanie, Walter	Biwi	Hanka, Walter	Hanka, Walter	Walked (Day 63)						6
Marion	Christian, Frank	Evicted (Day 14)			Frank, Karim	Walked (Day 59)						13
Hanka	Christian, Marion	Christian, Karim	Biwi	Biwi, Walter	Marion, Walter	Evicted (Day 56)						9
Biwi	Not in House		Nominated	Daniela, Jörg	Evicted (Day 42)							7
Jörg	Christian, Marion	Christian, Karim	Celine	Biwi, Karim	Walked (Day 38)							4
Celine	Not in House		Nominated	Evicted (Day 35)								N/A
Christian	Hanka, Stefanie	Hanka, Stefanie	Walked (Day 31)									17
Stefanie	Christian, Marion	Christian, Karim	Evicted (Day 28)									9
Public nominations	Christian; 64%	Stefanie; 76%	none	Hanka; 60.79%	Hanka; 39.02%	Ebru; 59.33%	Ebru; 77.49%	Ebru; 49.01%	none			
Nominated	Christian, Marion	Christian, Stefanie	Biwi, Celine	Biwi, ~~Jörg,~~; Walter	Hanka, Marion, Walter	Frank, Harry, Walter	Alex, Lillian, Linda	Alex, Linda	Alex, Alida, Ebru, Frank, Harry	Alida, Frank, Harry		
Walked	none			Christian, Jörg	none	Marion, Karim, Daniela	none					
Evicted	Marion; 55.07% to evict	Stefanie; 90.87% to evict	Celine; 1 of 9 votes to save	Biwi; 67.03% to evict	Hanka; 44% to evict	Walter; 57% to evict	Lillian; 41.3% to evict	Linda; 63% to evict	Ebru; 63% (out of 5) to evict	Frank; 7.02% (out of 3)	Harry; 26.87% (out of 2)	
Evicted	Marion; 55.07% to evict	Stefanie; 90.87% to evict	Celine; 1 of 9 votes to save	Biwi; 67.03% to evict	Hanka; 44% to evict	Walter; 57% to evict	Lillian; 41.3% to evict	Linda; 63% to evict	Alex; 57% (out of 4) to evict	Alida; 73.13% to win		

== See also ==
- Main Article about the show
