= Big Brother (German TV series) season 4 =

Big Brother
- Season 4
- Presented by: Aleksandra Bechtel
- No. of days: 98
- No. of housemates: 19
- Winner: Jan Geilhufe
- Runner-up: Nadja Steininger
- No. of episodes: 111

Release
- Original network: RTL Zwei
- Original release: 31 March – 7 July 2003

Season chronology
- ← Previous; Season 3 Next → Season 5

Season four of Big Brother Germany (Official title: Big Brother: the Battle) lasted from 31 March 2003 to 7 July 2003 and was shown on RTL 2.

== Season summary ==
After a disappointing third season and a two-year absence, Big Brother returned in 2003 with lower expectations and Aleks Bechtel now as the only main host. Copying the "Battle"-format from the Netherlands, the season lasted for 98 Days, making it the shortest season on BB Germany back then. Eight housemates entered the house on Day 1 with 11 more contestants joining them throughout the season after these intruders lived together on a secret place called "the exile" on Mallorca. There were two areas, one "poor" and one "rich" area. When one team won a match, they moved to the rich area and the other had to go to the poor area. The season was won by Jan Geilhufe. The title song of the season was performed by Olli P., who would eventually become the host in the next season, called Alles ändert sich (Everything changes).

The fact that a certain number of housemates lived together isolated before entering the real show proved to create some tension and relationships between the housemates. Sava Radovic for example was never too shy to flirt with the female contestants starting an on-and-off relationship with both Carla and Larissa in the Exile which became obvious when both entered the house together. After both of the girls got voted off very early blonde Hella made her entry into the main house to become Savas new object of desire and "serious" girlfriend on the show. Thanks to a reported bitchy behaviour in the exile, Lucie Daskiewitsch was the most hated housemate even before making her entrance into the house only to prove that she was not all that bad.

Just like in former years, the winner Jan Geilhufe came from the former GDR and got along with everyone in the house. One could say he would fly under the radar but since similar types of housemates have won before, he was tipped to win from the very first day. He won a prize of 90,000 Euros.

Due to the excitement of return and divide of the household the season proved to be a surprise rating hit and resulted in the decision to progress the twists that were introduced in this season which were eventually seen in the next year.

== Housemates ==
Name	Age on entry	Hometown	Occupation	Day entered	Day exited	Result
Jan Geilhufe	23	Essen	Pool supervisor	1	99	Winner
Nadja Steininger	21	Frankfurt	Pole dancer	1	99	Runner-up
Holger Remme	35	Hermsdorf	Gastronomer	22	99	3rd Place
Gabriel	28	Pfäffikon, Switzerland	Financial advisor	36	99	4th Place
Nadine Miree	30	Nottuln	Stewardess	1	92	Evicted
Sava Radović	28	Ludwigshafen	Football coach	8	92	Evicted
Kai Hupe	31	Algesdorf	Foundry engineer	8	85	Evicted
Hella Hofer	21			29	78	Evicted
Lucie Daskiewitsch	24	Chemnitz	Student	36	71	Evicted
Clemens Fischer	31	Vienna, Austria	Music and video producer	22	64	Evicted
Botho-Kay Kessels	36	Montabaur	Sales representative	36	57	Evicted
Petra Gebhardt	23	Schwandern	Business economist	29	50	Evicted
Khadra Sufi	22	Bonn	Medical technical assistant	1	43	Evicted
Ulf Franz	38	Dormagen	Glazier	1	36	Evicted
Larissa Spolan	22	Berlin	Beautician	15	29	Evicted
Carla Marroquin	21	Kiel	Retail saleswoman	15	22	Evicted
Gabriella Prokai	30	Ditzingen	Artist	1	15	Evicted
Marc Storz	29	Mannheim	Carpenter	1	7	Walked
Michel Wettstein	38	Rieden, Switzerland	Fashion agency owner	1	5	Walked

== Nominations table ==
	Week 1	Week 2	Week 3	Week 4	Week 5	Week 6	Week 7	Week 8	Week 9	Week 10	Week 11	Week 12	Week 13		Week 14 Final	
	Week 1	Week 2	Week 3	Week 4	Week 5	Week 6	Week 7	Week 8	Week 9	Week 10	Week 11	Week 12	Day 85	Day 92	Week 14 Final	
Jan	No; Nominations	No; Nominations	No; Nominations	No; Nominations	No; Nominations	No; Nominations	Petra	Lucie	Holger	Lucie	Kai	Kai	Holger	Gabriel	Winner (Day 98)	
Nadja	No; Nominations	No; Nominations	No; Nominations	No; Nominations	No; Nominations	No; Nominations	Petra	Lucie	Holger	Holger	Holger	Kai	Holger	Gabriel	Runner-up (Day 98)	
Holger	Not in House			No; Nominations	No; Nominations	No; Nominations	Petra	Lucie	Lucie	Lucie	Nadja	Nadja	Nadja	Nadine	Third place (Day 98)	
Gabriel	Not in House					No; Nominations	Sava	Botho	Clemens	Sava	Hella	Sava	Sava	Nadine	Fourth place (Day 98)	
Nadine	No; Nominations	No; Nominations	No; Nominations	No; Nominations	No; Nominations	No; Nominations	Clemens	Botho	Clemens	Hella	Hella	Sava	Sava	Jan	Evicted (Day 92)	
Sava	Not in House	No; Nominations	No; Nominations	No; Nominations	No; Nominations	No; Nominations	Clemens	Botho	Clemens	Gabriel	Nadine	Nadine	Gabriel	Evicted (Day 92)		
Kai	Not in House	No; Nominations	No; Nominations	No; Nominations	No; Nominations	No; Nominations	Petra	Lucie	Lucie	Lucie	Nadja	Nadja	Evicted (Day 85)			
Hella	Not in House				No; Nominations	No; Nominations	Botho	Botho	Clemens	Gabriel	Nadine	Evicted (Day 78)				
Lucie	Not in House					No; Nominations	Petra	Kai	Nadja	Kai	Evicted (Day 71)					
Clemens	Not in House			No; Nominations	No; Nominations	No; Nominations	Nadine	Botho	Sava	Evicted (Day 64)						
Botho	Not in House					No; Nominations	Sava	Sava	Evicted (Day 57)							
Petra	Not in House				No; Nominations	No; Nominations	Lucie	Evicted (Day 50)								
Khadra	No; Nominations	No; Nominations	No; Nominations	No; Nominations	No; Nominations	No; Nominations	Evicted (Day 42)									
Ulf	No; Nominations	No; Nominations	No; Nominations	No; Nominations	No; Nominations	Evicted (Day 36)										
Larissa	Not in House		No; Nominations	No; Nominations	Evicted (Day 29)											
Carla	Not in House		No; Nominations	Evicted (Day 22)												
Gabriella	No; Nominations	No; Nominations	Evicted (Day 15)													
Marc	No; Nominations	Walked (Day 7)														
Michel	No; Nominations	Walked (Day 5)														
Notes	1, 2	1					3, 4	3	3, 5	3	3, 6	3, 7	3	none	8	
Up for eviction	Gabriella, Jan, Khadra, Marc, Michel, Nadine, Nadja, Ulf	Gabriella, Jan, Kai, Khadra, Nadine, Nadja, Sava, Ulf	Carla, Jan, Kai, Khadra, Larissa, Nadine, Nadja, Sava, Ulf	Clemens, Holger, Jan, Kai, Khadra, Larissa, Nadine, Nadja, Sava, Ulf	Clemens, Hella, Holger, Jan, Kai, Khadra, Nadine, Nadja, Petra, Sava, Ulf	Botho, Clemens, Gabriel, Hella, Holger, Jan, Kai, Khadra, Lucie, Nadine, Nadja, Petra, Sava	Clemens, Petra	Botho, Lucie	Clemens, Holger	Gabriel, Lucie	Hella, Nadja	Kai, Sava	Holger, Sava	Gabriel, Nadine	Gabriel, Holger, Jan, Nadja	
Walked	Michel, Marc	none														
Evicted	Eviction; Cancelled	Gabriella; 25.9% to evict	Carla; 34.8% to evict	Larissa; 31.8% to evict	Ulf; 35.6% to evict	Kadhra; 31.2% to evict	Petra; 70.9% to evict	Botho; 66.5% to evict	Clemens; 52.9% to evict	Lucie; 72.2% to evict	Hella; 58.7% to evict	Kai; 75.5% to evict	Sava; 59.4% to evict	Nadine; 77.1% to evict	Gabriel; 14.6% (out of 4)	Holger; 21.5% (out of 3)
Evicted	Eviction; Cancelled	Gabriella; 25.9% to evict	Carla; 34.8% to evict	Larissa; 31.8% to evict	Ulf; 35.6% to evict	Kadhra; 31.2% to evict	Petra; 70.9% to evict	Botho; 66.5% to evict	Clemens; 52.9% to evict	Lucie; 72.2% to evict	Hella; 58.7% to evict	Kai; 75.5% to evict	Sava; 59.4% to evict	Nadine; 77.1% to evict	Nadja; 42.6% (out of 2)	Jan; 57.4% to win

- Housemates on the Red team
- Housemates on the Blue team

=== Notes ===
- ^Note 1: This week, there were no nominations and all Housemates automatically faced the public vote to evict.
- ^Note 2: Due to the departure of both Michel and Marc, Week 1's eviction was cancelled.
- ^Note 3: This week, Housemates were only allowed to nominate a member of their own team for eviction. The Housemate with the most nominations from each team would face the public vote.
- ^Note 4: Because Clemens and Sava tied with two nominations each, the Red Team was forced to break the tie.
- ^Note 5: Because Holger and Lucie tied with two nominations each, the Blue Team was forced to break the tie.
- ^Note 6: Because Hella and Nadine tied with two nominations each, the Red Team was forced to break the tie.
- ^Note 7: Because Kai and Nadja tied with two nominations each, the Blue Team was forced to break the tie.
- ^Note 8: This week, the public were voting for a winner, rather than to evict.

== See also ==
- Main Article about the show
