= Percy Hoven =

German television presenter and voice actor (born 1965)

Percy Hoven (born 20 February 1965 in Munich) is a former German broadcast and television show host and actor. He was the presenter of the first Big Brother Germany season on German commercial television RTL.

== Career ==
After completing high school diploma at the College of St. Blasien, Hoven finished a banker apprenticeship at Bayerische Hypotheken und Wechselbank, then studied philosophy and economics at LMU Munich as well as media marketing at the Bavarian Academy of Advertising in Munich and journalistic training at the Bavarian public radio (BR).

Percy Hoven has already been in touch with the entertainment industry by his father, the actor, director and filmmaker Adrian Hoven. He acted in the two witch films Mark of the Devil and Mark of the Devil Part II in 1970 and 1973. After graduating, he worked as TV, radio and event show host and dubbing actor for various broadcasters and companies. In 2000 he became known in Germany as a presenter of the first Big Brother season on German television. In late 2004, Hoven left the television business and opened a studio for portraits in Munich.

In 2014, he presented the Augsburg Presseball, a charity event of the news industry.

Percy Hoven was married to presenter Silvia Laubenbacher. He lives with their two children in Bobingen.

== Character "Dr. Alfons Proebstl" ==
Without revealing his identity, Percy Hoven, entered the role of "Dr. Alfons Proebstl" on his own YouTube channel. According to the opinion of the newspaper Augsburger Allgemeine, in this role he represented "right-wing extremist positions" in allegedly satirical forms, the show host disc jockey Matthias Matuschik assigns his utterances to the "brown swamp". On 9 September 2015, Matuschik had identified Hoven as Dr. Alfons Proebstl. Newspaper Die Zeit claimed Hoven had spread "xenophobic resentments".

In November 2014 Hoven also appeared as Proebstl at the Russia conference which was hosted by right wing magazine eigentümlich frei, and in 2015 on an event hosted by PEGIDA.

The identity behind Dr. Alfons Proebstl was a secret until early October 2015, the newspaper Augsburger Allgemeine published an article about Percy Hoven, who had become unrecognizable behind a rubber mask. He admitted to the newspaper he was the actor behind the character of Dr. Alfons Proebstl, and announced the end of the character.

According to n-tv, Hoven showed that the character of Dr. Alfons Proebstl was a collaborative project with Munich-based producer Alfred Schropp and his editorial team.

A character called Dr. Proebstl can also be found in the earlier repertoire of Gerhard Polt.
