= Joyn (streaming platform) =

German video on demand provider

- Website type: Video aggregator streaming platform
- Available in: German
- Founded: 2017
- Country of origin: Germany
- Owner: ProSiebenSat.1 Media
- Chairperson: Katharina Frömsdorf (CEO)
- Products: Streaming platform for Live and catch up
- Operating income: 66.000.000 EUR
- Employees: 300
- Website: https://www.joyn.de/
- IPv6 support: No
- Registration: Not required
- Users: 7 million
- Launched: 18 June 2019
- Current status: Online

Joyn GmbH (formerly 7TV Joint Venture GmbH) is a German streaming company fully owned by ProSiebenSat.1 Media. Among other things, it operates the streaming platform Joyn, which had more than seven million users per month in January 2020, the pay-per-view service Maxdome and the streaming service Discovery+ (which subsumed Eurosport Player).

The streaming platform Joyn officially replaced its predecessor service 7TV on 18 June 2019, and the video-on-demand portal maxdome on 2 September 2020. In the 3rd/4th In the fourth quarter of 2020, the Eurosport Player and, later, the maxdome store were also integrated into Joyn.

== Contents ==
Joyn offers a free service for smart TVs, mobile and PC devices. This is in German and includes the streaming of some series and films with advertising and live streaming from various TV channels.

=== JoynPlus ===
Joyn Plus is a subscription with exclusive films and series and ad-free streaming, as well as an extended range of live TV channels (in HD and also pay TV channels).

== Live streaming ==
There are 78 channels.

Joyn	ARD - Das Erste; ZDF; ProSieben; Sat.1; kabel eins; ZDFneo; DMAX; ProSieben MAXX; SIXX; Comedy Central; Sat.1 GOLD; ZDFinfo; kabel eins Doku; Tele 5; HGTV; arte; 3sat; phoenix; One; ServusTV; Eurosport 1; Sport1; Red Bull TV; Joyn	MTV; Deluxe Music; TLC; Primetime; N24 Doku; Tagesschau24; ARD-Alpha; CNBC; Bloomberg Television; Deutsche Welle; KiKA; nick; RiC; Welt; WDR; NDR; MDR; BR; SWR; rbb; hr; Radio Bremen TV; SR
Joyn PLUS+	ProSieben FUN; Sat.1 Emotions; kabel eins Classics; Discovery Channel; Animal Planet; Eurosport 2; Sport1+; eSports1; Wettercom TV	
