= BB6 =

BB6 can refer to:

- BB6, a postcode district in the BB postcode area
- Chassis code for the 5th Generation Honda Prelude (1997-2001), other codes include BB5, BB7, BB8
- Big Brother 6 (disambiguation), a television programme in various versions
  - Bigg Boss 6 (disambiguation), Indian versions of the TV franchise
