= Big Brother 5 =

Big Brother 5 is the season of various versions of Big Brother and may refer to:

- Big Brother 2005 (Netherlands), the 2005 Dutch edition of Big Brother
- Gran Hermano Spain (season 5), the 2003-2004 edition of Big Brother in Spain
- Grande Fratello Season 5, the second 2004 edition of Big Brother in Italy
- Big Brother 5 (UK), the 2004 UK edition of Big Brother
- Big Brother 5 (U.S.), the 2004 U.S. edition of Big Brother
- Big Brother Germany (season 5), the 2004-2005 German edition of Big Brother
- Big Brother Australia 2005, the 2005 Australian edition of Big Brother
- Big Brother Brasil 5, the 2005 Brazilian edition of Big Brother
- Gran Hermano Argentina (Season 5), the second 2007 Argentinian edition of Big Brother
- Loft Story (Canada) Season 5, the French-Canadian 2008 edition of Big Brother in Canada
- Big Brother 5 (Croatia), the 2008 Croatian edition of Big Brother
- Big Brother 2009 (Finland), the 2009 edition of Big Brother in Finland
- Big Brother Africa (season 5), the 2010 African edition of Big Brother
- Big Brother 5 (Greece), the 2010-2011 Greek edition of Big Brother
- Secret Story 2011 (France), the 2011 edition of Big Brother in France
- Big Brother 2011 (Sweden), the 2011 Swedish edition of Big Brother
- Bigg Boss 5 (disambiguation)
  - Bigg Boss (season 5), the 2011-2012 edition of Big Brother in India in Hindi
  - Bigg Boss Kannada (season 5), fifth season of Big Brother in India in Kannada
  - Bigg Boss (Malayalam season 5), fifth season of Big Brother in India in Malayalam
  - Bigg Boss (Tamil season 5), fifth season of Big Brother in India in Tamil
  - Bigg Boss (Telugu season 5), fifth season of Big Brother in India in Telugu
- Big Brother 5 (Albania), the 2012 Albanian edition of Big Brother
- Big Brother 2013 (Denmark), the 2013 Danish edition of Big Brother
- HaAh HaGadol 5, the 2013 edition of Big Brother in Israel
- Secret Story 5 (Portugal), the 2014 edition of Big Brother in Portugal
- Big Brother 5 (Bulgaria), the 2015 Bulgarian edition of Big Brother in Bulgaria
- Big Brother Canada (season 5), the 2017 edition of Big Brother Canada

== See also ==
- Big Brother (franchise)
- Big Brother (disambiguation)
