= BB5 =

BB5 may refer to:

- BB5, a postcode district in the BB postcode area
- Blake Bortles, American football quarterback who wears number 5
- Big Brother 5 (disambiguation), a television programme in various versions
  - Bigg Boss 5 (disambiguation), Indian versions of the TV franchise
- BB5 (film), a 2017 Indian Kannada-language film

== See also ==
- BB-5, the USS Kearsarge, a pre-dreadnought battleship
- BB(5), notation representing the fifth busy beaver
