= Big Brother 6 =

Big Brother 6 is the sixth season of various versions of Big Brother and may refer to:

- Big Brother 2006 (Netherlands), the 2006 Dutch edition of Big Brother
- Gran Hermano Spain (Season 6), the 2004 edition of the reality television series Big Brother (Gran Hermano Spain)
- Big Brother 2005 (UK), the 2005 edition of the UK reality television series Big Brother
- Big Brother 6 (U.S.), the 2005 edition of the US reality television series Big Brother
- Big Brother Germany (Season 6), the 2005-2006 German edition of Big Brother
- Big Brother Australia 2006, the 2006 edition of the reality television series Big Brother Australia
- Big Brother Brasil 6, the 2006 Brazilian edition of Big Brother
- Grande Fratello Season 6, the 2006 edition of the reality television series Big Brother in Italy
- Big Brother 2010 (Finland), the 2010 edition of Big Brother in Finland
- Gran Hermano Argentina (Season 6), the 2010-2011 Argentinian edition of Big Brother
- Big Brother Africa (season 6), the 2011 edition of Big Brother in Africa
- Secret Story 2012 (France), the 2012 edition of Big Brother in France
- Big Brother 2012 (Sweden), the 2012 Swedish edition of Big Brother
- Bigg Boss 6 (disambiguation)
  - Bigg Boss (season 6), the 2012-2013 edition of Big Brother in India in Hindi
  - Bigg Boss Kannada (season 6), sixth season of Big Brother in India in Kannada
  - Bigg Boss (Tamil season 6), sixth season of Big Brother in India in Tamil
  - Bigg Boss (Telugu season 6), sixth season of Big Brother in India in Telugu
- Big Brother 6 (Albania), the 2013 Albanian edition of Big Brother
- Big Brother 6 (Denmark), the 2014 Danish edition of Big Brother

== See also ==
- Big Brother (franchise)
- Big Brother (disambiguation)
