= Bigg Boss 6 =

Bigg Boss 6 is the sixth season of various versions of Bigg Boss (an Indian adaptation of the reality game show Big Brother):

- Bigg Boss (Hindi TV series) season 6
- Bigg Boss Kannada season 6
- Bigg Boss (Tamil TV series) season 6
- Bigg Boss (Telugu TV series) season 6

== See also ==
- Big Brother 6 (disambiguation)
- Bigg Boss (disambiguation)
- Bigg Boss 5 (disambiguation)
- Bigg Boss 7 (disambiguation)
- BB6 (disambiguation)
