= Bigg Boss 5 =

Bigg Boss 5 is the fifth season of various versions of Bigg Boss (an Indian adaptation of the reality game show Big Brother):

- Bigg Boss (Hindi season 5)
- Bigg Boss Kannada (season 5)
- Bigg Boss (Tamil season 5)
- Bigg Boss (Telugu season 5)
- Bigg Boss (Malayalam season 5)

== See also ==
- Big Brother 5 (disambiguation)
- Bigg Boss (disambiguation)
- Bigg Boss 4 (disambiguation)
- Bigg Boss 6 (disambiguation)
- BB5 (disambiguation)
