= Big Brother (German TV series) season 6 =

Big Brother
- Season 6
- Presented by: Ruth Moschner; Oliver Petszokat
- No. of days: 363
- No. of housemates: 59
- Winner: Michael Knopf
- Runner-up: Thomas Motz
- No. of episodes: 369

Release
- Original network: RTL Zwei
- Original release: 1 March 2005 – 26 February 2006

Season chronology
- ← Previous; Season 5 Next → Season 7

The sixth season of Big Brother Germany lasted for 363 days from 1 March 2005 to 26 February 2006 and is therefore the second longest running Big Brother show worldwide, but was firstly considered to run without an end.

The housemates lived in a village with 3 houses: Rich, Normal and Poor. Firstly the housemates had to work in three working areas, a car repair, a fashion atélier and a farm. Midway throughout this season, the working areas were closed down. At the end of the season, a hotel was established where ordinary people or celebrities could visit, the hotel was run by the winner of Celebrity Big Brother UK 2006, Chantelle Houghton.

== Summary ==
Originally this season wasn't meant to end in at least few years, as long as broadcaster would have successful ratings. On 25 November 2005 was announced by RTL II that this "forever" season would end on 26 February 2006 in big ultimate show of Big Brother Germany.

This season started at season 5 finale on 1 March 2005 at 21:15 local time and lasted for 363 days. Auditions held in December 2004 in biggest cities in Austria, Germany, and Switzerland.

In contradiction to pre-season rumors it wasn't complete settlement with church and forest, which should be simulated in big area. This was a facility with three homes.

The village consisted of three houses. Contestants that lived in particular living environments had society status suitable to living area status. Contestants lived in Rich House ("Bosses"), Middle-class house ("Assistants"), and Survival ("Servants"). Even the accommodation reflects each contestant's social standing in the village. The three houses (3, 7, and 9) have separated entrants from the square. In houses 11 and 13 are held matches, as well as in Arena (name "Matchfield" in Season 5). Residents can earn money in various working environments (Car repair garage, The Farmyard, and Fashion Studio). This was the only BB season to have individual so important in team budget, because each individual had his salary.

Weekly task is given to housemates on Monday by Big Brother. Given goal should be reached until Friday, when it ends. On Friday, Big Brother decides what contestants had achieved. Team should manage to reach 100% to receive €1,200. Team consists of one Boss, two Assistances, and two Servants. The distribution of wages is respective Boss. Big Brother set requirement that Boss earns €500, Assistances €250, and Servants €100. But ultimately Boss himself decides the wages. Boss was allowed to award "Golden Point" to the greatest employee. Two golden points meant promotion to Assistant for Servant and €500 cash to his account for Assistant. If one team does not reach weekly target (lower than 85%), than Boss losts his position of power and became a Servant, than viewers vote another team member to become The Boss.

Some work areas change purpose during the season. The Fashion Studio was changed into Big Brother Hotel on 26 November 2005. The Car Repair Headquarters are changed into the Big Brother – Morning Show studio between 28 November 2005 and 30 December 2006. The morning show was broadcast every morning from 8:55 am to 9:55 am at RTL II. Car Repair Garage was modified into The Wedding Chapel for housemate Marco and former housemate Bettina and later into the ice rink.

The Village had its internal telephone system for residents from different houses to communicate. The original village was 5,000 sq meters large, and later was new 600 sq meters facility constructed in the village. This modified village had also entertaining areas, such as pub (Big Bar) and fitness centre.

At launch 11 residents (3 Bosses, 4 Assistants, and 4 Servants) entered the village. In following weeks, it increased to 15 residents, which count as the original cast.

The nomination process varies through the season. Usually Big Brother pre-determinates group of housemates that cannot be nominated (Gender, Work Teams, Home Teams, etc.).

Each housemate has his or her own BB account. This account allows contestants to increase wages by challenges and matches. Contestant receives all earned cash won during his or her stay at the eviction. If contestant is expelled or voluntarily leaves the village, then he does not receive his or her account.

The grand cash prize jackpot (250,000 Euro) has been given twice this season. The first time to Giuseppe in August 2005 and second time to Michael at the season finale. During season were housemates awarded cash prizes weekly. All prizes were almost €2,000,000.

== Housemates ==
Name	Age on entry	Hometown	Occupation	Day entered	Day exited	Result
Michael Knopf	26	Berlin	Dental technician	209	363	Winner
Thomas Motz	25	Augsburg	Student	90	363	Runner-up
Denis Odak	25		Health advisor	230	363	3rd Place
Ginny Pape	19	Grabow	Hairdresser trainee	146	363	Joint 4th Place
Torsten Vogel	26		Concrete worker	258	363	Joint 4th Place
Heike Hoffmann	27		Nurse	232	363	Joint 4th Place
Manuela Carstensen	31	Siebnen, Switzerland	Hairdresser	293	356	Evicted
Ivan Zardin	25		Parquet recliner	279	356	Evicted
Michelle Littbarski	18	Weilerswist	Trainee	216	349	Evicted
Gina Schmitz	19	Hamburg	Unemployed	1	342	Evicted
Marco Wirges	31	Bonn	Unemployed	55	335	Evicted
Gerry	35	Vienna, Austria	Model	307	335	Ejected
Janice Behrendt	22	Cottbus	Office clerk	314	329	Walked
Bianca Binek	32	Neuss	Waitress	280	328	Evicted
Birgit Sinn	45	Bremen	Musician	209	321	Evicted
Giuseppe Pellegrino	21		Industrial mechanic	1	314	Evicted
Larissa Jung	21		Unemployed	272	307	Evicted
Sascha Borchers	30		Health insurance agent	209	293	Evicted
Christopher	20	Heiligenhafen	Unemployed	244	279	Evicted
Farah El-Massri	26	Bochum	Retail store manager	262	273	Walked
Heike Sander	41	Minden	Make-up artist	209	272	Evicted
Jasmin Ubküni	22	Spielberg-Sachsenheim	Office clerk	251	260	Walked
Josef "Yousef" Jakob	31		Unemployed	83	258	Evicted
Beate Sauer	45		Musician	209	251	Evicted
Daniela Schulze	29	Frankenthal	Unemployed	1	244	Evicted
Jessie Johnson	22	Bamberg	Retail salesman	209	230	Evicted
Daniela "Danni" Becker	24	Schwerte	Model	132	227	Walked
Bettina Zimmermann	27	Montabaur	Nurse	14	223	Evicted
Nina Schneeweis	20		Unemployed	97	216	Evicted
Martin Ächter	22		Care aid	167	188	Evicted
Frank Pape	38	Grabow	Unemployed	146	188	Evicted
Benjamin Ulrich	25		Unemployed	167	188	Evicted
Martin "Nugy" Kochte	32		Bar owner	125	188	Evicted
Parsifal Baron von Pallandt	36	Vienna, Austria	Stylist	1	181	Evicted
Nicole Krauss	22		Personal assistant	167	177	Walked
Alexander Geist	32	Cologne	Singer	111	174	Evicted
Cathy Kujack	23	Potsdam	Nurse	125	174	Evicted
Anastasja Capotosti	29		Unemployed	139	146	Walked
Sharon Novak	25	Vienna, Austria	Unemployed office clerk	69	146	Evicted
Sylvia Popovic	20		Waitress	42	139	Evicted
Thorsten Rath	20		Fitness coach	28	132	Evicted
Anke Kremb	25	Aachen	Computer store clerk	88	125	Evicted
Melanie Matzanke	30	Nagold	Policewoman	90	121	Walked
Norman Magolei	25	Viersen	Holiday representative	1	111	Evicted
Anna Poliakova	19	Hürth	Model	7	97	Evicted
Sarah "Shire" Chew	28	Bonn	Promoter	42	90	Evicted
André Niebles	31	Wickede	Process engineer	1	90	Evicted
Marion Auferkamp	32	Datteln	Social insurance agent	21	83	Walked
Ludger Auferkamp	39	Datteln	Fitness studio manager	21	83	Evicted
Ali Can	22	Cologne	Retail salesman	76	77	Ejected
Cecilia "Dinorah" Castillo Trístan	20	Cottbus	Student	28	69	Evicted
Juanita Chenone	27	Nuremberg	Dancer	1	62	Evicted
Marcel Neumüller	24	Arnum	Marketing salesman	21	49	Evicted
Leyla Eryigit	20	Hofgeismar	Unemployed	1	40	Walked
Said El-Hajjami	24	Dortmund	Retail salesman	1	35	Evicted
Gregor Hartmann	22	Dresden	Student	7	27	Walked
Tim Bibelhausen	33	Cologne	Hairdresser	1	18	Walked
Sven "Charly" Caspersen	41	Frankfurt am Main	Painter	14	17	Ejected
Bernadette Schneiders-Ott	37	Otterndorf	Hairdresser	1	14	Evicted

== Nominations table ==
In the event of the tie, the Village Mayor decided who is up for eviction.

=== Rounds 1–18 ===
	#1	#2	#3	#4	#5	#6	#7	#8	#9	#10	#11	#12	#13	#14	#15	#16	#17	#18
Michael	Not in House																	Nina
Thomas	Not in House								Parsifal	Sharon	Exempt	Exempt	Nominated	Nugy	Exempt	Parsifal	Nominated	Nina
Ginny	Not in House														Nugy	Parsifal	Nominated	Nina
Gina	Exempt	Gregor	Giuseppe	Daniela	Daniela	Parsifal	Nominated	Daniela	Parsifal	Melanie	Exempt	Nominated	Exempt	Danni	Exempt	Frank	Nominated	Nina
Marco	Not in House			Nominated	Dinorah	Thorsten	Nominated	Sharon	Parsifal	Sylvia	Exempt	Exempt	Nominated	Alex	Exempt	Frank	Nominated	Nina
Birgit	Not in House																	Thomas
Giuseppe	Exempt	Gina	Gina	Sylvia	Sylvia	Thorsten	Nominated	Sylvia	Marco	Anke	Exempt	Nominated	Exempt	Cathy	Exempt	Parsifal	Nominated	Danni
Sascha	Not in House																	Nina
Heike S.	Not in House																	Nina
Yousef	Not in House						Exempt	Sylvia	Parsifal	Bettina	Nominated	Exempt	Exempt	Cathy	Exempt	Parsifal	Nominated	Nina
Beate	Not in House																	Thomas
Daniela	Exempt	Anna	Juanita	Juanita	Dinorah	Marco	Nominated	Bettina	Yousef	Bettina	Exempt	Exempt	Nominated	Bettina	Exempt	Parsifal	Nominated	Danni
Jessie	Not in House																	Gina
Danni	Not in House											Exempt	Exempt	Frank	Nominated	Parsifal	Nominated	Nina
Bettina	Exempt	Gregor	Thorsten	Sylvia	Anna	Ludger	Nominated	Anna	Yousef	Anke	Exempt	Exempt	Nominated	Yousef	Exempt	Parsifal	Nominated	Nina
Nina	Not in House								Yousef	Anke	Nominated	Exempt	Exempt	Cathy	Exempt	Marco	Nominated	Danni
Nugy	Not in House										Exempt	Exempt	Exempt	Alex	Exempt	Marco	Nominated	Evicted (Day 188)
Benjamin	Not in House															Exempt	Nominated	Evicted (Day 188)
Frank	Not in House													Cathy	Exempt	Parsifal	Nominated	Evicted (Day 188)
Martin	Not in House															Exempt	Nominated	Evicted (Day 188)
Parsifal	Exempt	Said	Marcel	Thorsten	Gina	Marco	Nominated	Gina	Marco	Anke	Nominated	Exempt	Exempt	Alex	Exempt	Giuseppe	Evicted (Day 181)	
Nicole	Not in House															Walked (Day 177)		
Alex	Not in House									Sylvia	Exempt	Nominated	Exempt	Cathy	Nominated	Evicted (Day 174)		
Cathy	Not in House										Exempt	Exempt	Exempt	Nina	Evicted (Day 174)			
Anastasja	Not in House												Exempt	Walked (Day 146)				
Sharon	Not in House					André	Nominated	Anna	Marco	Anke	Exempt	Exempt	Nominated	Evicted (Day 146)				
Sylvia	Not in House			Bettina	Bettina	Norman	Nominated	Daniela	Norman	Melanie	Exempt	Nominated	Evicted (Day 139)					
Thorsten	Not in House				Dinorah	Marco	Nominated	Anna	Norman	Sharon	Nominated	Evicted (Day 132)						
Anke	Not in House						Exempt	Gina	Giuseppe	Sharon	Evicted (Day 125)							
Melanie	Not in House								Norman	Sylvia	Walked (Day 121)							
Norman	Exempt	Leyla	Leyla	Sylvia	Sylvia	Thorsten	Nominated	Sylvia	Thorsten	Evicted (Day 111)								
Anna	Exempt	Gregor	Marcel	Daniela	Dinorah	André	Nominated	Bettina	Evicted (Day 97)									
Shire	Not in House		Nominated	Sylvia	Anna	Ludger	Nominated	Evicted (Day 90)										
André	Exempt	Juanita	Juanita	Juanita	Sylvia	Ludger	Nominated	Evicted (Day 90)										
Marion	Not in House		Leyla	Bettina	Dinorah	Thorsten	Walked (Day 83)											
Ludger	Not in House		Anna	Dinorah	Dinorah	Giuseppe	Evicted (Day 83)											
Ali	Not in House						Ejected (Day 77)											
Dinorah	Not in House	Nominated	Anna	Anna	Anna	Evicted (Day 69)												
Juanita	Exempt	André	Marcel	Parsifal	Evicted (Day 62)													
Marcel	Not in House		Juanita	Evicted (Day 49)														
Leyla	Exempt	Said	André	Walked (Day 40)														
Said	Exempt	Leyla	Evicted (Day 35)															
Gregor	Nominated	Anna	Walked (Day 27)															
Tim	Nominated	Walked (Day 18)																
Charly	Exempt	Ejected (Day 18)																
Bernadette	Nominated	Evicted (Day 14)																
Notes																		
Audience	none	Said; 60.7% Anna; 15.0%	none			Ludger; 36.3%	none	Anna; 59.3%	Norman; 39.8%	Anke; 30.2%	none					Bettina; 41.0%	none	Daniela; 37.6%
Up for eviction	Bernadette; Tim; Gregor	Said; ~~Anna~~	~~Juanita~~; Marcel	~~Sylvia~~; Juanita	Dinorah; Sylvia	Ludger; Thorsten	All; Housemates	Anna; Sylvia	Norman; Parsifal	Anke; Sharon	Nina; Parsifal; Thorsten; Yousef	Alex; Gina; Giuseppe; Sylvia	Bettina; Daniela; Marco; Sharon; Thomas	Alex; Cathy; Nugy	Alex; Danni	Gina; Parsifal; Thomas	All; Housemates	Danni; Nina
Up for eviction	Bernadette; Tim; Gregor	Said; Dinorah	Marcel; Shire	Juanita; Marco	Dinorah; Sylvia	Ludger; Thorsten	All; Housemates	Anna; Sylvia	Norman; Parsifal	Anke; Sharon	Nina; Parsifal; Thorsten; Yousef	Alex; Gina; Giuseppe; Sylvia	Bettina; Daniela; Marco; Sharon; Thomas	Alex; Cathy; Nugy	Alex; Danni	Gina; Parsifal; Thomas	All; Housemates	Danni; Nina
Walked	none	Tim; Gregor	Leyla	none		Marion	none			Melanie	none		Anastasja	none		Nicole	none	
Ejected	none	Charly	none			Ali	none											
Evicted	Bernadette; 83.5% to evict	Said; 68.6% to evict	Marcel; 52.5% to evict	Juanita; 68.9% to evict	Dinorah; 63.3% to evict	Ludger; 87.7% to evict	Shire; 1.8% to save	Anna; 83.8% to evict	Norman; 78.3% to evict	Anke; 61.6% to evict	Thorsten; 54.5% to evict	Sylvia; 55.7% to evict	Sharon; 63.1% to evict	Cathy; 77.7% to evict	Alex; 83.3% to evict	Parsifal; 73.1% to evict	Martin; 1.06% to save	Nina; 51.0% to evict
Evicted	Bernadette; 83.5% to evict	Said; 68.6% to evict	Marcel; 52.5% to evict	Juanita; 68.9% to evict	Dinorah; 63.3% to evict	Ludger; 87.7% to evict	Shire; 1.8% to save	Anna; 83.8% to evict	Norman; 78.3% to evict	Anke; 61.6% to evict	Thorsten; 54.5% to evict	Sylvia; 55.7% to evict	Sharon; 63.1% to evict	Cathy; 77.7% to evict	Alex; 83.3% to evict	Parsifal; 73.1% to evict	Frank; 1.12% to save	Nina; 51.0% to evict
Evicted	Bernadette; 83.5% to evict	Said; 68.6% to evict	Marcel; 52.5% to evict	Juanita; 68.9% to evict	Dinorah; 63.3% to evict	Ludger; 87.7% to evict	André; 2.0% to save	Anna; 83.8% to evict	Norman; 78.3% to evict	Anke; 61.6% to evict	Thorsten; 54.5% to evict	Sylvia; 55.7% to evict	Sharon; 63.1% to evict	Cathy; 77.7% to evict	Alex; 83.3% to evict	Parsifal; 73.1% to evict	Benjamin; 1.19% to save	Nina; 51.0% to evict
Evicted	Bernadette; 83.5% to evict	Said; 68.6% to evict	Marcel; 52.5% to evict	Juanita; 68.9% to evict	Dinorah; 63.3% to evict	Ludger; 87.7% to evict	André; 2.0% to save	Anna; 83.8% to evict	Norman; 78.3% to evict	Anke; 61.6% to evict	Thorsten; 54.5% to evict	Sylvia; 55.7% to evict	Sharon; 63.1% to evict	Cathy; 77.7% to evict	Alex; 83.3% to evict	Parsifal; 73.1% to evict	Nugy; 1.40% to save	Nina; 51.0% to evict

=== Rounds 19–Finale ===
	#19	#20	#21	#22	#23	#24	#25	#26	#27	#28	#29	#30	#31	#32	#33	#34	#35	Final
Michael	Bettina	Sascha	Daniela	Yousef	Heike S.	Nominated	Denis	Larissa	Giuseppe	Bianca	Bianca	Marco	Nominated	Michelle	Ginny	Nominated	Nominated	Winner (Day 363)
Thomas	Bettina	Michael	Heike S.	Michael	Heike S.	Nominated	Sascha	Larissa	Bianca	Brigit	Gerry	Ivan	Exempt	Thomas	Ivan; ~~Heike H.~~	Nominated	Nominated	Runner-up (Day 363)
Denis	Not in House		Beate	Yousef	Brigit	Nominated	Marco	Brigit	Michael	Michael	Michael	Michael	Exempt	Not; Eligible	~~Manuela~~; Michael	Nominated	Nominated	Third place (Day 363)
Ginny	Marco	Michael	Beate	Marco	Brigit	Nominated	Marco	Larissa	Ivan	Ivan	Michael	Michael	Exempt	Not; Eligible	Michael; ~~Ivan~~	Nominated	Nominated	Evicted (Day 363)
Torsten	Not in House				Heike S.	Nominated	Marco	Bianca	Manuela	Manuela	Bianca	Michael	Exempt	Not; Eligible	Michael; ~~Ivan~~	Nominated	Nominated	Evicted (Day 363)
Heike H.	Not in House		Heike S.	Yousef	Michelle	Nominated	Giuseppe	Michelle	Michelle	Michelle	Michelle	Michelle	Exempt	Not; Eligible	Michael; ~~Torsten~~	Nominated	Nominated	Evicted (Day 363)
Manuela	Not in House							Larissa	Gina	Gina	Gerry	Marco	Exempt	Not; Eligible	Michael; ~~Torsten~~	Nominated	Evicted (Day 356)	
Ivan	Not in House						Giuseppe	Heike H.	Manuela	Michelle	Michelle	Manuela	Exempt	Not; Eligible	~~Michael~~; Heike H.	Evicted (Day 356)		
Michelle	Marco	Beate	Beate	Marco	Heike H.	Nominated	Sascha	Gina	Michael	Ivan	Gerry	Marco	Exempt	Nominated	Evicted (Day 349)			
Gina	Yousef	Heike S.	Beate	Yousef	Heike S.	Nominated	Sascha	Bianca	Bianca	Brigit	Gerry	Ivan	Nominated	Evicted (Day 342)				
Marco	Ginny	Jessie	Gina	Giuseppe	Heike S.	Nominated	Sascha	Michelle	Giuseppe	Michelle	Michelle	Michelle	Evicted (Day 335)					
Gerry	Not in House								Giuseppe	Exempt	Ginny	Ejected (Day 335)						
Janice	Not in House									Exempt	Exempt	Walked (Day 329)						
Bianca	Not in House						Giuseppe	Gina	Ginny	Michael	Michael	Evicted (Day 328)						
Birgit	Marco	Michael	Michelle	Giuseppe	Heike S.	Nominated	Giuseppe	Michelle	Michael	Michael	Evicted (Day 321)							
Giuseppe	Marco	Jessie	Beate	Marco	Heike S.	Nominated	Marco	Heike H.	Bianca	Evicted (Day 314)								
Larissa	Not in House					Exempt	Giuseppe	Bianca	Evicted (Day 307)									
Sascha	Bettina	Heike S.	Heike S.	Marco	Heike S.	Nominated	Thomas	Evicted (Day 293)										
Christopher	Not in House			Marco	Heike S.	Nominated	Evicted (Day 279)											
Farah	Not in House				Michelle	Walked (Day 273)												
Heike S.	Marco	Sascha	Beate	Michael	Brigit	Evicted (Day 265)												
Jasmin	Not in House				Walked (Day 260)													
Yousef	Bettina	Jessie	Daniela	Denis	Evicted (Day 258)													
Beate	Bettina	Jessie	Gina	Giuseppe	Evicted (Day 251)													
Daniela	Marco	Michael	Gina	Evicted (Day 244)														
Jessie	Bettina	Brigit	Evicted (Day 230)															
Danni	Bettina	Walked (Day 227)																
Bettina	Yousef	Evicted (Day 223)																
Notes																		none
Audience	Bettina; 72.5%	Jessie; 45.7%	Daniela; 70.0%	Yousef; 22.8%	Birgit; 41.9%	none	Giuseppe; 52.0%	Larissa; 39.5%	Giuseppe; 46.7%	Birgit; 57.5%	Bianca; 42.2%	Marco; 22.1%	none					
Up for eviction	Bettina; Marco	Jessie; Michael	Beate; Daniela	Marco; Yousef	Birgit; Heike S.	All; Housemates	Giuseppe; Sascha	Larissa; Michelle	Giuseppe; Michael	Bianca; Birgit; Michelle	Bianca; Michelle	Marco; Michael	Gina; Michael	Michelle; Thomas	Ivan; Michael	All; Housemates	Denis; Ginny; Heike H. Michael; Thomas; Torsten	Denis; Michael; Thomas
Walked	none	Danni	none		Jasmin	Farah	none					Janice	none					
Ejected	none											Gerry	none					
Evicted	Bettina; 77.4% to evict	Jessie; 92.7% to evict	Daniela; 79.1% to evict	Yousef; 80.1% to evict	Heike S. 57.2% to evict	Christopher; 1.3% to save	Sascha; 53.6% to evict	Larissa; 78.9% to evict	Giuseppe; 69.5% to evict	Birgit; 61.0% to evict	Bianca; 74.6% to evict	Marco; 58.4% to evict	Gina; 68.3% to evict	Michelle; 54.5% to evict	Ivan; 71.3% to evict	Manuela; 3.1% to save	Heike H. 39.9% to evict	Denis; 8.1% (out of 3)
Evicted	Bettina; 77.4% to evict	Jessie; 92.7% to evict	Daniela; 79.1% to evict	Yousef; 80.1% to evict	Heike S. 57.2% to evict	Christopher; 1.3% to save	Sascha; 53.6% to evict	Larissa; 78.9% to evict	Giuseppe; 69.5% to evict	Birgit; 61.0% to evict	Bianca; 74.6% to evict	Marco; 58.4% to evict	Gina; 68.3% to evict	Michelle; 54.5% to evict	Ivan; 71.3% to evict	Manuela; 3.1% to save	Torsten; 46.4% to evict	Thomas; 48% (out of 2)
Evicted	Bettina; 77.4% to evict	Jessie; 92.7% to evict	Daniela; 79.1% to evict	Yousef; 80.1% to evict	Heike S. 57.2% to evict	Christopher; 1.3% to save	Sascha; 53.6% to evict	Larissa; 78.9% to evict	Giuseppe; 69.5% to evict	Birgit; 61.0% to evict	Bianca; 74.6% to evict	Marco; 58.4% to evict	Gina; 68.3% to evict	Michelle; 54.5% to evict	Ivan; 71.3% to evict	Manuela; 3.1% to save	Ginny; 35.0% to evict	Michael; 52% to win

Housemates on the rich team		Housemates on the poor team
Housemates in first duel	Housemates in second duel	Housemates in third duel

=== Notes ===
- ^1 The teams (Bosses, Assistants, Workers) should decide between themselves who should be up for eviction.
- ^2 The person who is nominated is not actually been evicted. They're up for eviction with a new contender. The first pair displays the two housemates nominated and secondly the still nominated housemates with his/her contender.
- ^3 All female housemates could be nominated.
- ^4 All male housemates could be nominated.
- ^5 The housemates are playing for a jackpot which is paid out by the percentage in a public vote. The two housemates with the fewest votes to save are evicted. Anke and Yousef were saved, as they were new housemates.
- ^6 All female housemates could be nominated except for Anke who was a new housemate.
- ^7 All male housemates could be nominated.
- ^8 All female housemates could be nominated except for Nina who was a new housemate.
- ^9 All housemates that worked in the Fashion Studio are automatically up for eviction.
- ^10 All housemates that worked in the Workshop are automatically up for eviction.
- ^11 All housemates that worked in the Farm are automatically up for eviction.
- ^12 All housemates could be nominated.
- ^13 As Danni and Ginny failed the Secret Garden challenge, the one with the more nominations will face eviction with the housemates who came second in the previous public vote. Therefore, Danni and Alex are nominated.
- ^14 As Gina and Thomas failed to get the most nominations in a secret mission, they are up for eviction with Parsifal.
- ^15 The housemates are playing for a jackpot which is paid out by the percentage in a public vote. The four housemates with the fewest votes to save are evicted.
- ^16 All housemates of the Poor Team could be nominated.
- ^17 All housemates of the Rich Team could be nominated.
- ^18 All housemates entered on Day 209 could be nominated.
- ^19 All female housemates could be nominated.
- ^20 All male housemates could be nominated.
- ^21 All female housemates could be nominated.
- ^22 The housemates are playing for a jackpot which is paid out by the percentage in a public vote. The housemate with the fewest votes to save is evicted. As Larissa is a new housemate, she was immune from eviction.
- ^23 All male housemates could be nominated. As Ivan is a new housemate, he was immune from eviction.
- ^24 All female housemates could be nominated. As Manuela is a new housemate, she was immune from eviction.
- ^25 All housemates could be nominated. Gerry was immune as new housemates and Birgit won immunity in a match.
- ^26 All housemates could be nominated. Gerry and Janice were immune as new housemates. Bianca was nominated for giving the worst reason for her nomination.
- ^27 All housemates could be nominated.
- ^28 All housemates could be nominated.
- ^29 The winner of a darting competition should nominate two housemates for eviction. Ivan, the winner, refuses to nominate two persons for eviction. Therefore, Big Brother decided that the female and the male housemates with the lowest score in round 1 of the competition should be up for eviction.
- ^30 The housemates were told to evict one member of their own team. What they don't know was that this person would nominate one housemate of their respective team for eviction. Michael and Thomas were chosen to be fake evicted. Then Michael chose Michelle and Thomas himself to be up for eviction.
- ^31 The housemates were given the choice to nominate as normal in the diary room or to choose between 2 names at random. This nomination took place face to face. Denis was immune from this eviction as he had won a match.
- ^32 The housemates are playing for a jackpot which is paid out by the percentage in a public vote. The housemate with the fewest votes to save is evicted.
- ^33 All housemates were automatically nomination and drawn into pairs. The three winners moved to the final part of the voting.
