= Big Brother (Danish TV series) season 5 =

Big Brother
- Season 5
- Presented by: Anne Kejser
- No. of days: 104
- No. of housemates: 21
- Winner: Bjørn
- Runner-up: Silas

Release
- Original release: 4 February – 18 May 2013

Season chronology
- ← Previous; Season 4 Next → Season 6

Big Brother is the fifth season of the Danish reality television series Big Brother, a television series produced by Endemol. The season premiered on February 4, 2013, on Kanal 5. The winner wins a prize of 500,000 DKK. Anne Kejser is the host of Big Brother Denmark 2013.

== Housemates ==
Name	Age on entry	Occupation	Residence
Aissatou	22	Social/Health care student	Kongens Lyngby
Bianca	31	Lingerie expert	Aarhus
Bjørn Clausen	24	Works in a toy store	Malmö, Sweden
Camilla B. Nielsen	37	Make-up artist	Frederiksberg
Danijel	25	Doorman	Frederiksværk
David Feldstedt	32	Electrician	Skovlunde
Dennis	24	Customer service agent	Copenhagen
Camilla Hartmann "Hartmann"	19	Hairdressing student	Viborg
Julie Weinreich Olsen	20	Bartender and student	Ballerup
Katja	26	Teaching assistant	Ballerup
Lene	22	Student	Sorø
Malene	33	??	Hundested
Martin Hibel	27	Porter	Roskilde
Phillip	26	Teaching assistant	Frederiksberg
Ronni	22	Farmer	Randers
Shawn	21	Music producer and entertainer	Ballerup
Silas	22	Poker player	Aarhus
Simone	18	Student	Stenløse
Tania	23	Waitress and bartender	Brøndbyøster
Tarik	22	Painter and Youth club volunteer	Copenhagen
Victor	22	Trade economist	Næstved

== Nominations table ==
	Week 1	Week 2	Week 3	Week 4	Week 5	Week 6	Week 7	Week 8	Week 9	Week 10	Week 11	Week 12	Week 13	Week 14	Week 15				Nominations received
	Week 1	Week 2	Week 3	Week 4	Week 5	Week 6	Week 7	Week 8	Week 9	Week 10	Week 11	Week 12	Week 13	Week 14	Day 100	Day 101	Finale		Nominations received
Bjørn	Tarik; Camilla	Tarik; David	No; Nominations	Lene; Hartmann	David; Lene	No; Nominations	No; Nominations	No; Nominations	Nominated	Katja; Hartmann	Tarik; Katja	Exempt	Katja; Tania	No; Nominations	Not; Eligible	Silas to save	Winner (Day 104)		13
Silas	Not in House					No; Nominations	No; Nominations	No; Nominations	Exempt	Hartmann; Katja	Camilla; Tarik	Nominated	Katja; Tania	No; Nominations	Not; Eligible	Nominated	Runner-Up (Day 104)		11
Victor	Camilla; Tarik	Tarik; Camilla	No; Nominations	Julie; Hartmann	Evicted (Day 27)					Julie; Hartmann	Dennis	Nominated	Katja; Tania	Nominated	Not; Eligible	Tania to save	Third Place (Day 104)		8
Tania	Camilla; Lene	Lene; Camilla	No; Nominations	Julie; Victor	Camilla; David	No; Nominations	Exempt	No; Nominations	No; Nominations	Julie; Hartmann	Hartmann; Camilla	No; Nominations	Silas; Bjørn	No; Nominations	Camilla to evict	Nominated	Evicted (Day 101)		12
Camilla	Tarik; Lene	Aissatou; Hartmann	Nominated	Katja; Dennis	Hartmann; Katja	No; Nominations	No; Nominations	Exempt	Nominated	Tarik; Hartmann	Hartmann; Katja	No; Nominations	Katja; Tania	Nominated	Nominated	Evicted (Day 100)			55
Dennis	Shawn; Camilla	Bjørn; Ronni	No; Nominations	Victor; Julie	Julie; Hartmann	No; Nominations	No; Nominations	No; Nominations	No; Nominations	Julie; Silas	Hartmann; Katja	No; Nominations	Silas; Bjørn	Nominated	Evicted (Day 97)				8
Katja	Camilla; Bjørn	Lene; Ronni	No; Nominations	Victor; Julie	Julie; Hartmann	Nominated	Evicted (Day 41)			Silas; Julie	Silas; Camilla	No; Nominations	Silas; Bjørn	Re-Evicted (Day 90)					30
Tarik	Camilla; Shawn	Hartmann; Camilla	No; Nominations	Julie; Camilla	Hartmann; Camilla	No; Nominations	No; Nominations	No; Nominations	Exempt	Julie; Camilla	Silas; Bjørn	Nominated	Evicted (Day 83)						15
Hartmann	Camilla; Shawn	Camilla; Ronni	Nominated	Julie; Victor	Ronni; Camilla	Evicted (Day 34)				Silas; Julie	Camilla; Tarik	Re-Evicted (Day 76)							35
Julie	Secret; Caravan	Katja; Camilla	No; Nominations	Katja; Hartmann	Hartmann; Ronni	No; Nominations	No; Nominations	No; Nominations	Evicted (Day 55)	Dennis; Hartmann	Re-Evicted (Day 69)								30
Lene	Camilla; Shawn	Camilla; Ronni	No; Nominations	Camilla; Victor	Tania; Camilla	No; Nominations	No; Nominations	No; Nominations	Nominated	Evicted (Day 62)									14
David	Camilla; Bjørn	Bjørn; Camilla	No; Nominations	Julie; Victor	Hartmann; Camilla	No; Nominations	Nominated	Nominated	Ejected (Day 59)										4
Ronni	Camilla; Dennis	Hartmann; Lene	No; Nominations	Hartmann; Julie	Hartmann; Lene	Nominated	No; Nominations	No; Nominations	Ejected (Day 59)										8
Danijel	Not in House					Nominated	No; Nominations	Nominated	Evicted (Day 55)										N/A
Malene	Not in House					No; Nominations	Nominated	Evicted (Day 48)											N/A
Phillip	Katja; Camilla	Katja; Camilla	No; Nominations	Julie; Camilla	Camilla; Julie	No; Nominations	Nominated	Evicted (Day 48)											0
Aissatou	Tania; Dennis	Katja; Camilla	Nominated	Evicted (Day 20)															2
Bianca	Camilla; Lene	Lene; Ronni	Evicted (Day 13)																N/A
Simone	Secret; Caravan	Walked (Day 9)																	N/A
Elise	Shawn; Camilla	Left (Day 8)																	N/A
Shawn	Dennis; Camilla	Evicted (Day 6)																	7
Martin	Ejected (Day 5)																		N/A
Notes	1, 2, 3, 4	5, 6	7	8	none	9	10	11	12	13	14	15	16	17	18	19	none		
Nominated	Camilla; Shawn; Tarik	Bianca; Camilla; Julie; Katja; Lene	Aissatou; Camilla; Hartmann	Hartmann; Julie; Victor	Camilla; Hartmann; Julie	Danijel; Katja; Ronni	David; Malene; Phillip	Danijel; David	Bjørn; Camilla; Lene	Hartmann; Julie; Silas	Camilla; Dennis; Hartmann	Silas; Tarik; Victor	Katja; Silas; Tania	Camilla; Dennis; Victor	Camilla	Silas; Tania	Bjørn; Silas; Victor		
Walked	none	Simone	none																
Ejected	Martin	none							David; Ronni	none									
Evicted	Shawn; Fewest votes to save	Bianca; Fewest votes to save	Aissatou; Fewest votes to save	Victor; Fewest votes to save	Hartmann; Fewest votes to save	Katja; Fewest votes to save	Malene; Fewest votes to save	Julie; Automatically evicted	Lene; Fewest votes to save	Julie; Fewest votes to save	Hartmann; Fewest votes to save	Tarik; Fewest votes to save	Katja; Fewest votes to save	Dennis; Fewest votes to save	Camilla; Tania's choice to evict	Tania; Lost challenge	Victor; Fewest votes to win	Silas; Fewest votes to win	
Evicted	Shawn; Fewest votes to save	Bianca; Fewest votes to save	Aissatou; Fewest votes to save	Victor; Fewest votes to save	Hartmann; Fewest votes to save	Katja; Fewest votes to save	Phillip; Fewest votes to save	Danijel; Fewest votes to save	Lene; Fewest votes to save	Julie; Fewest votes to save	Hartmann; Fewest votes to save	Tarik; Fewest votes to save	Katja; Fewest votes to save	Dennis; Fewest votes to save	Camilla; Tania's choice to evict	Tania; Lost challenge	Bjørn; Most votes to win		

=== Notes ===
- ^Note 1 : Elise is a mole working for Big Brother. Then the producers asked on the official Facebook who the public want to be the nominations of Elise. Aissatou, Bianca, David, Hartmann, Julie, Martin and Simone were exempted of that vote. Shawn received the most votes and is nominated by Elise with 2 points. Camilla received the next most votes and is nominated by Elise with 1 point.
- ^Note 2 : Tania pushed the red bottom of the living area and had to evict someone from the house. She chose Simone, but she was fake evicted and moved to a caravan.
- ^Note 3 : Phillip pushed the red button so he had to choose 5 housemates that weren't going to be part of a party. He chose: Elise, Ronni, Bjørn, Katja and Julie. Then, a "rabbit" entered the bedroom and told them that the 5 of them had to "evict" someone, and they chose Julie. She was fake evicted and moved to a caravan.
- ^Note 4 : The housemates were divided into 2 teams: Aissatou, Bianca, David, Elise, Hartmann and Martin in one team and the other 11 on the other team. They were divided between those who are there for the money and those who are there for the experience. The small team had to go to the bedroom where there was a red button too. The team who pushed the button first was immune, and the small team won, so they were all immune to this week.
- ^Note 5 : Bianca was automatically nominated for rule-breaking.
- ^Note 6 : Julie was automatically nominated because she failed the secret task (to the other housemates nominate her).
- ^Note 7 : Aissatou, Camilla and Hartmann were nominated by Big Brother after the "Get Naked or Get Nominated" task from this week (The housemates had to get naked when music broadcasts in the house, and those who didn't do it, were nominated).
- ^Note 8 : The housemates voted for who they want to get immunity for the next week. Tarik received 3 votes (Aissatou, David & Phillip) and won immunity. Other votes: David received 2 votes (Dennis & Ronni), Katja received 2 votes (Tania & Tarik), Phillip received 2 votes (Hartmann & Victor), Ronni received 2 votes (Bjørn x2), Camilla received 1 vote (Julie), Dennis received 1 vote (Lene), Julie received 1 vote (Camilla) and Tania received 1 vote (Katja).
- ^Note 9 : The 3 new housemates entered the house on Day 36. After the party, they moved to a Special Room. On Day 37 they had to choose 3 housemates to be up for nomination this week. They chose David, Katja and Ronni, and they returned to the main house and the 3 nominees went to the Special Room. On Day 38 the 3 nominees competed against the 3 newbies in a challenge. The nominees won the challenge so they could save one of them and put one of the newbies up for nomination. David was saved and Danijel moved to the Special room with Katja and Ronni. On Day 39 Malene and Silas competed against Katja and Ronni in another challenge. Malene and Silas won, so they were safe from eviction, and Katja and Ronni were nominated against Danijel.
- ^Note 10 : There was a special task this week called "Crime Scene". One of the housemates was chosen by the viewers as the killer and he/she had to kill 2 housemates. The victims must guess who the murder is, if they don't solve it they will be nominated together with the person they guessed wrong. But if they succeed the murderer will be automatically evicted. David was the first housemate to be "killed" on 17 March and Malene on 18 March. On 19 March, all the housemates but the killer and David and Malene could take an Angel which would give immunity to them. Everyone thought that Tania was the killer, so she decided to take it and she won immunity from this week. On 21 March, David and Malene chose Phillip as their guess for the killer. Camilla was the killer, so David, Malene and Phillip were up for eviction and was a double eviction.
- ^Note 11 : This week, the task is called "Crime Scene II", with the same rules of the kast week, but now with 2 "killers". Camilla, who was the killer last week, won a special power. That special power is to give immunity to herself or another housemate. She chose herself, so she is immune. Silas was the first to be "killed" and Danijel the second. Silas correct guessed that Julie was his killer, so she was automatically evicted. Danijel chose David as their guess for the killer. Tania was the killer, so Danijel and David were up for eviction.
- ^Note 12 : This week, the task is called "Democracy". On 1 April, they had a paper with "Democracy" written on it, and the one who would destroy it would gain immunity and put someone up for eviction. Silas took it, gained immunity and put Lene up for eviction. On 2 April, Tarik destroyed the "Democracy" paper. He gained immunity and nominated Camilla.
- ^Note 13 : The task this week is "Superhero". The task includes housemates previously evicted. Silas was named "BB-Man". He then had to choose his partner, "BB-Woman" between 3 evicted housemates: Katja, Julie and Hartman. He chose Hartman to be "BB-Woman". So Hartman moved back in the house to help him. But there's no superhero without a supervillain. And so on, Big Brother named Victor as the new Supervillain. He is in the other house, with the two rejected "BB-Woman" Katja and Julie. The one who plays the best the villain part out of those three will win his place in the house back. Victor, Julie and Katja, the three villains, won back their places and are now officially back as full housemates. Victor was voted by the public on Facebook as the Best Villain, he won immunity this week. Silas, as BB Man, should have won immunity. However, the task included a "ball ceremony". Housemates each had to balls to place, either on BB Man, which would have granted immunity to him and make housemates win the Gold Package or on their name, which would have to guarantee them immunity but would fail the task. Tania decided to put her two balls on her name, she is then immune, Silas isn't and they lost Gold Package.
- ^Note 14 : Victor won the "Miss Big Brother 2013" task. As a reward, he won immunity, and could automatically nominate someone. Victor chose to automatically nominate Dennis. Victor was exempt to vote.
- ^Note 15 : New week task starting is "The battle against the clock". Housemates will have a different challenge where their trust, mutual friendship, selfishness and resourcefulness will be tested against a timing. And the big challenge will be a race against time, which ends with the clock rings at exactly the time that viewers via the web have determined. The housemate who has the clock when it rings is nominated. This week task started on 21 April, and first, they had to choose to pair with the housemate they trust the most. Tania chose Tarik, Katja chose Dennis, Silas chose Camilla and Victor chose Bjørn. Then, the public had to vote for who they wanted to carry the clock first. Victor was the most voted. When Victor was voted to carry the clock, a countdown of 60min started. If at the end of the 60min, Victor was still carrying the clock, he would be nominated. The only way he had to be saved, as if his partner, Bjørn, stopped the countdown. Then the clock would pass on another pair and go on like that until Wednesday and the one carrying it the last would be nominated. If the partner chooses not to do it, he would be immune and the one carrying the clock automatically nominated. Bjørn decided no to stop the countdown, so he is immune and automatically nominates his partner Victor. On 22 April, nobody was nominated cause they all protected each other. So on 23 April, they did a new task. They had a clock, and they had to wear around the neck and then pass it to another housemate. When the clock ring, the one wearing it would be nominated. Camilla passed it to Tarik and then the clock rang, so Tarik is nominated. Earlier on 24 April, the last nomination challenge took place. Only Camilla, Tania, Katja, Dennis and Silas took part in this task (Bjørn is immune, Victor and Tarik already nominated). They were in the task room, and they had to wait for 1h to break some jar with a hammer. The one who guessed the closest to 60min could nominate the housemate he wanted to. Dennis came the closest and won. He nominated Silas.
- ^Note 16 : On 1 May, the housemates had a "Chilli Challenge". They had to eat as many peppers as they could. Each pepper they eat, give them some points based on how strong it is. Victor and Silas won the challenge, with 21 points each. In the end, Silas decided to withdraw and let Victor be the immune one this week. Also, Big Brother added points from a "game" to the nominations. The points from the "game" are from the tasks. Every time they failed to keep a straight face they had a point of punishment. Tania received 4 points, Bjørn and Katja 3 points, Camilla 2 points and Silas 1 point. Dennis received 4 points. Dennis didn't fail to keep a straight face once during the weeks game, so Big Brother removed his points.
- ^Note 17 : This week task was about balls. They had to win as many balls as possible through different challenges and then put them in the container of the housemates they wanted to see nominated the most. The 2 housemates with the heaviest container, in the end, would be automatically nominated and the 3rd and 4th would fight to not be nominated in a duel. Victor and Dennis received the heaviest container and were automatically nominated. Then Tania and Camilla, who finished in 3rd and 4th, had to fight in a paintball western duel. Tania won, so Camilla was nominated.
- ^Note 18 : Housemates will have the lives of each other into their own hands. They're allowed to talk tactics. It started with a poll on the Facebook page. Viewers had to give an advantage to any of the housemates. Tania received the most votes and won an advantage. Her advantage was an endurance competition in which they had to stand on one foot. Tania won that competition. She was called in the DR, they gave a chain with a small bottle on it, she had to pass to someone else. She passed it to Bjørn. Bjørn then passed it to Silas, Silas passed it to Victor, Victor passed it to Camilla, Camilla then passed it to Tania. That means that if Tania wants, as she now holds Camilla's life in her hands, she can empty the bottle and evict her. If she doesn't do it, then nobody's gonna is evicted on Day 100. She decided to empty the bottle and evict Camilla.
- ^Note 19 : Public will nominate and housemates will evict. The public can vote for whoever you want to nominate. Tania and Silas received the most votes and were nominated. The housemates voted to save. Because only 2 housemates voted, and there was a tie, the nominees competed in a challenge. The loser will be evicted. Tania lost the challenge, and was evicted.

=== Ejection Notes ===
- Martin was ejected on Day 5 for lying during the casting process. He claimed he had a clean criminal record but the producers found out that he had been arrested and sentenced to six years in prison for several frauds and scams.
- David and Ronni were ejected on Day 59 for physical violence against each other.
