= Big Brother (German TV series) season 5 =

Big Brother
- Season 5
- Presented by: Ruth Moschner
- No. of days: 365
- No. of housemates: 59
- Winner: Sascha Sirtl
- Runner-up: Franziska Lewandrowski
- No. of episodes: 419

Release
- Original network: RTL Zwei
- Original release: 2 March 2004 – 1 March 2005

Season chronology
- ← Previous; Season 4 Next → Season 6

The fifth season of Big Brother Germany lasted for one year from 2 March 2004 to 1 March 2005 and is therefore the longest running Big Brother show worldwide. This season is the longest uninterrupted live television broadcast according to Guinness World Records.

== Season summary ==
The Housemates lived in a house with 3 areas. Rich, Normal and Survivor. Every week the housemates had to compete in challenges. Some of these challenges included jumping from a flying helicopter into water. At the beginning of the last two months, the survivor area was used as a punishment zone. The title song this season, "Alles was du willst (Everything You Want)" by Lex. Franziska "Franzi" Lewandrowski won second place and the prize of €50,000. Sascha Sirtl won the season and the prize of €1,000,000.

The 4-hour finale on 1 March 2005 was watched by 30% audience share in targeted 14–29 years.

== Housemates ==
Name	Age on entry	Hometown	Occupation	Day entered	Day exited	Result
Sascha Sirtl	26	Milan, Italy	Model	1	365	Winner
Franziska Lewandrowski	24	Arnsberg	Freelance promoter	1	365	Runner-up
Michael Homula	34	Nuremberg	Trained salesperson	1	364	Third place
Franz-Josef "Jupp" Heinrichs	32	Aachen	Carpenter	301	364	Fourth place
Carsten Hansche	37		Actor	133	364	Fifth place
Toni Nogara	27	Bretten	Businessman	245	364	Sixth place
Nicole Hansen	22	Munich	Promoter	252	364	Evicted
Natalie Langer	25	Troisdorf	Event promoter	294	357	Evicted
Daniela Peter	23	Bielefeld	Certified cosmetologist	165	350	Evicted
Lelo Halilovic	24	Frankfurt am Main	Kiosk owner	274	343	Evicted
Peggy Hamadi-Dambra	27	Berlin	Trained baker	275	336	Evicted
Geraldine Engel	26	Munich	Product manager	192	329	Evicted
Isabel Rosentreter	32	Munich	Foreign language correspondent	287	322	Evicted
Marcus Mahn	22	Berlin	Retail salesperson	189	315	Evicted
Rolf Stojic	36	Cologne	Mail carrier	256	308	Evicted
Eric Schnith	22	Berlin	Promoter	282	301	Evicted
Katrin	30	Stuttgart	Self employed promoter	259	287	Evicted
Volkmar Bueck	33	Hamburg	Certified hotel manager	227	287	Walked
Serhat Atmaca	26	Berlin	Stylist	266	277	Walked
Lydija Fink	20	Krefeld	Pharmacy technician apprentice	105	273	Walked
Jerry Dejaoui	23	Stuttgart	Mechanic	1	189	Evicted
Jerry Dejaoui	23	Stuttgart	Mechanic	238	273	Evicted
Zoya	20	Kassel		215	259	Evicted
Mark Stabel	28	Hamburg	Motorist	20	252	Evicted
Petra	37	Saarlouis	Nail artist	250	250	Walked
Sandra Liesenfeld	30		Graphic designer	148	245	Evicted
Solveigh Maurice	31	Munich	Office clerk	210	244	Walked
Mario	37	Bochum	Business clerk	203	231	Evicted
Miriam Leyek	24	Aachen	Waitress	112	224	Ejected
Michele	22	Hamburg	Waiter	175	217	Evicted
Christian	27	Leverkusen	Unemployed	182	210	Evicted
Michael R.	24	Karlsruhe	Tractor driver	196	206	Walked
Patricia	25	Wilhelmshaven	Animator	119	203	Evicted
Silvana Altmann	24	Wilhelmshaven	Journalism student	168	190	Walked
Heiko Herlofson	34	Leipzig	Unemployed	24	175	Evicted
Paco Francisco Salas	39	Siegen	Window display designer	84	162	Walked
Nadine Linde	20	Edemissen	Medical assistant	137	161	Evicted
Alessandro Comune	25	Hilden	Model	109	154	Evicted
Ilkay Uslu	32	Meerbusch	Model agency owner	98	141	Walked
Elisabeth Weber	20	Berlin	Unemployed	10	133	Evicted
Frank Fußbroich	35	Cologne	Vegetable supplier	91	132	Walked
Nicole Beifuß	33	Dorsten	Model	35	125	Walked
Thomas Kathmann	38	Berlin	Hotel manager	40	119	Evicted
Jeannine Glei	28	Quedlinburg	Freelance dancer	17	105	Evicted
Karim Maataoui	29	Hamburg	Singer	77	102	Walked
Jennifer Strese	21	Henningsdorf	Hair stylist	57	91	Evicted
Maxine Fedorov	20	Munich	Stylist	56	77	Evicted
Doreen Faber	23	Aschaffenburg	Prize agency owner	42	63	Evicted
Ali Can	20	Cologne	Temp worker	17	56	Evicted
Franco Baumann	30	St. Margrethen	Gastronomer	10	53	Walked
Nadja	24	Ingolstadt	Childcare provider	24	49	Evicted
Achim Löbig	39	Rödermark	Businessman	1	37	Walked
Jennifer Bové	20	Oberhausen	Animation dancer	18	35	Evicted
Ramona Rosenfeld	22	Aachen	Self-employed	17	34	Walked
Susanne Moll	24	Cologne	Student	24	26	Walked
Kader Loth	35	Berlin	Model	1	24	Evicted
Kay	35	Hamburg	Self-employed	10	19	Walked
Sandra Ratzel	22	Berlin	Stripper	1	17	Ejected
Sascha Meder	29	Eberbach	Geriatric caregiver	1	17	Evicted
Silvia	34	Heilbronn	Stylist	1	10	Evicted

== Nominations table ==
=== Rounds 1-18 ===
	#1	#2	#3	#4	#5	#6	#7	#8	#9	#10	#11	#12	#13	#14	#15	#16	#17	#18
Sascha S.	Exempt	Exempt	Exempt	Elisabeth	Nadja	Exempt	Doreen	Maxine	Jennifer S.	Mark	Nicole B.	Elisabeth	Ilkay	Miriam	Heiko	Miriam	Patricia	Exempt
Franziska	Nominated	Exempt	Exempt	Elisabeth	Nadja	Exempt	Nicole B.	Maxine	Elisabeth	Jeannine	Thomas	Lydija	Ilkay	Nadine	Heiko	Miriam	Sandra L.	Exempt
Michael H.	Exempt	Exempt	Exempt	Ali	Mark	Exempt	Nicole B.	Maxine	Elisabeth	Jeannine	Sascha S.	Elisabeth	Ilkay	Nadine	Lydija	Miriam	Sascha S.	Nominated
Carsten	Not in House												Ilkay	Miriam	Lydija	Miriam	Patricia	Exempt
Daniela	Not in House														Michael H.	Jerry	Carsten	Nominated
Geraldine	Not in House																Sascha S.	Exempt
Marcus	Not in House																Sascha S.	Exempt
Lydija	Not in House										Nicole B.	Elisabeth	Sascha S.	Nadine	Michael H.	Miriam	Sascha S.	Nominated
Jerry	Exempt	Exempt	Exempt	Ali	Mark	Nominated	Doreen	Thomas	Elisabeth	Franziska	Nicole B	Elisabeth	Illkay	Miriam	Heiko	Miriam	Evicted (Day 189)	
Mark	Not in House		Exempt	Michael H.	Nadja	Exempt	Nicole B.	Maxine	Elisabeth	Franziska	Thomas	Heiko	Ilkay	Nadine	Heiko	Miriam	Patricia	Exempt
Sandra L.	Not in House													Franziska	Jerry	Patricia	Carsten	Exempt
Mario	Not in House																	Exempt
Miriam	Not in House											Heiko	Ilkay	Nadine	Heiko	Jerry	Carsten	Exempt
Michele	Not in House															Miriam	Patricia	Nominated
Christian	Not in House																Sascha S.	Nominated
Michael R.	Not in House																	Walked (Day 206)
Patricia	Not in House											Elisabeth	Alessandro	Jerry	Heiko	Jerry	Carsten	Evicted (Day 203)
Silvana	Not in House															Jerry	Walked (Day 190)	
Heiko	Not in House		Exempt	Ali	Jerry	Exempt	Sascha S.	Maxine	Jennifer S.	Jeannine	Sascha S.	Elisabeth	Sascha S.	Jerry	Lydija	Evicted (Day 175)		
Paco	Not in House									Franziska	Thomas	Michael H.	Sascha S.	Jerry	Walked (Day 162)			
Nadine	Not in House												Alessandro	Mark	Evicted (Day 161)			
Alessandro	Not in House										Nicole B.	Paco	Patricia	Evicted (Day 154)				
Ilkay	Not in House											Elisabeth	Sascha S.	Walked (Day 141)				
Elisabeth	Not in House	Nominated	Exempt	Michael H.	Jeannine	Exempt	Nicole B.	Nicole B.	Jennifer S.	Jeannine	Nicole B.	Heiko	Evicted (Day 133)					
Frank	Not in House									Franziska	Thomas	Elisabeth	Walked (Day 132)					
Nicole B.	Not in House				Nadja	Exempt	Doreen	Maxine	Elisabeth	Mark	Ilkay	Walked (Day 125)						
Thomas	Not in House				Nicole B.	Franziska	Exempt	Doreen	Elisabeth	Jerry	Nicole B.	Evicted (Day 119)						
Jeannine	Not in House		Exempt	Elisabeth	Nadja	Exempt	Doreen	Maxine	Elisabeth	Mark	Evicted (Day 105)							
Karim	Not in House								Heiko	Jeannine	Walked (Day 102)							
Jennifer S.	Not in House							Maxine	Elisabeth	Evicted (Day 91)								
Maxine	Not in House							Thomas	Evicted (Day 77)									
Doreen	Not in House					Exempt	Nicole B.	Evicted (Day 63)										
Ali	Not in House		Exempt	Jennifer B.	Mark	Nominated	Evicted (Day 56)											
Franco	Not in House	Exempt	Exempt	Elisabeth	Mark	Walked (Day 53)												
Nadja	Not in House		Exempt	Jennifer B.	Franziska	Evicted (Day 49)												
Achim	Exempt	Exempt	Nominated	Jennifer B.	Walked (Day 37)													
Jennifer B.	Not in House			Elisabeth	Evicted (Day 35)													
Ramona	Not in House		Exempt	Elisabeth	Walked (Day 34)													
Susanne	Not in House			Walked (Day 26)														
Kader	Exempt	Exempt	Nominated	Evicted (Day 24)														
Kay	Not in House	Exempt	Walked (Day 19)															
Sandra R.	Exempt	Exempt	Walked (Day 17)															
Sascha M.	Exempt	Nominated	Evicted (Day 17)															
Silvia	Nominated	Evicted (Day 10)																
Audience	Silvia; 51.7% Franziska; 30.8%	Sascha M. 45.1% Elisabeth; 25.7%	Kader; 45% Achim; 33.2%	Jennifer B. 33.8% Elisabeth; 33.6%	Nadja; 29.1% Jeannine; 25%	Ali; 64.2% Michael H. 16.4%	Doreen; 68.9% Nicole B. 16.6%	Maxine; 49.3% Nicole B. 34.2%	Elisabeth; 47.7% Jennifer S. 25.9%	Jeannine; 40.7% Mark; 22.4%	Nicole B. 30.3% Ilkay; 21.5%	Paco; 37.6% Elisabeth; 28.3%	Ilkay; 67.2% Sascha S. 11.9%	No public nominations				
Up for eviction	Franziska; Silvia	Elisabeth; Sascha M.	Achim; Kader	Elisabeth; Jennifer B.	Mark; Nadja	Ali; Michael H.	Doreen; Nicole B.	Maxine; Thomas	Elisabeth; Jennifer S.	Jeannine; Mark	Nicole B. Thomas	Elisabeth; Heiko	Alessandro; Sascha S.	Miriam; Nadine	Heiko; Lydija	Jerry; Mark	Carsten; Patricia	Christian; Daniela; Lydija; Michael H. Michele
Evicted	Silvia; 62.7% to evict	Sascha M. 63.7% to evict	Kader; 57.5% to evict	Jennifer B. 54.3% to evict	Nadja; 54.8% to evict	Ali; 79.6% to evict	Doreen; 65.7% to evict	Maxine; 74.5% to evict	Jennifer S. 58.5% to evict	Jeannine; 74.3% to evict	Thomas; 67.5% to evict	Elisabeth; 59.7% to evict	Alessandro; 18.4% to save	Nadine; 37.4% to save	Heiko; 46.2% to save	Jerry; 37.7% to save	Patricia; 49.1% to save	Christian; 42.1% to evict

=== Rounds 19 - Finale ===
	#19	#20	#21	#22	#23	#24	#25	#26	#27	#28	#29	#30	#31	#32	#33	#34	#35	Final	
	#19	#20	#21	#22	#23	#24	#25	#26	#27	#28	#29	#30	#31	#32	#33	#34	#35	Day 364	Day 365
Sascha S.	Daniela	Mario	Geraldine	Exempt	Daniela	Exempt	Exempt	Exempt	Nominated	Nominated	No; Nominations	No; Nominations	No; Nominations	No; Nominations	No; Nominations	Exempt	Nicole H.	Nominated	Winner (Day 365)
Franziska	Lydija	Mario	Sandra L.	Exempt	Michael H.	Exempt	Exempt	Exempt	Nominated	Nominated	No; Nominations	No; Nominations	No; Nominations	No; Nominations	No; Nominations	Exempt	Nicole H.	Nominated	Runner up (Day 365)
Michael H.	Lydija	Solveigh	Geraldine	Exempt	Zoya	Exempt	Exempt	Exempt	Nominated	Nominated	No; Nominations	No; Nominations	No; Nominations	No; Nominations	No; Nominations	Exempt	Carsten	Nominated	Evicted (Day 364)
Jupp	Not in House								Exempt	Exempt	No; Nominations	No; Nominations	No; Nominations	No; Nominations	Walked (Day 347)	Exempt	Nicole H.	Nominated	Evicted (Day 364)
Carsten	Lydija	Solveigh	Sandra L.	Nominated	Daniela	Exempt	Exempt	Exempt	Nominated	Nominated	No; Nominations	No; Nominations	No; Nominations	No; Nominations	No; Nominations	Exempt	Toni	Nominated	Evicted (Day 364)
Toni	Not in House			Exempt	Michael H.	Exempt	Nominated	Nominated	Nominated	Nominated	No; Nominations	No; Nominations	No; Nominations	No; Nominations	No; Nominations	Nominated	Carsten	Nominated	Evicted (Day 364)
Nicole H.	Not in House					Nominated	Nominated	Nominated	Nominated	Nominated	No; Nominations	No; Nominations	No; Nominations	No; Nominations	No; Nominations	Exempt	Jupp	Evicted (Day 364)	
Natalie	Not in House								Exempt	Nominated	No; Nominations	No; Nominations	No; Nominations	No; Nominations	No; Nominations	Nominated	Evicted (Day 350)		
Daniela	Michele	Solveigh	Geraldine	Nominated	Zoya	Exempt	Exempt	Exempt	Nominated	Nominated	No; Nominations	No; Nominations	No; Nominations	No; Nominations	No; Nominations	Evicted (Day 350)			
Lelo	Not in House						Exempt	Nominated	Nominated	Nominated	No; Nominations	No; Nominations	No; Nominations	No; Nominations	Evicted (Day 343)				
Peggy	Not in House						Exempt	Exempt	Nominated	Nominated	No; Nominations	No; Nominations	No; Nominations	Evicted (Day 336)					
Geraldine	Michael H.	Solveigh	Sandra L.	Exempt	Lydija	Exempt	Exempt	Exempt	Nominated	Nominated	No; Nominations	No; Nominations	Evicted (Day 329)						
Isabel	Not in House							Exempt	Nominated	Nominated	No; Nominations	Evicted (Day 322)							
Marcus	Michael H.	Franziska	Sascha S.	Exempt	Michael H.	Exempt	Exempt	Exempt	Nominated	Nominated	Evicted (Day 315)								
Rolf	Not in House					Exempt	Exempt	Exempt	Nominated	Evicted (Day 308)									
Eric	Not in House							Nominated	Evicted (Day 301)										
Katrin	Not in House					Exempt	Nominated	Evicted (Day 287)											
Volkmar	Not in House		Sascha S.	Exempt	Zoya	Exempt	Exempt	Walked (Day 287)											
Serhat	Not in House						Walked (Day 277)												
Lydija	Michele	Franziska	Geraldine	Exempt	Zoya	Nominated	Walked (Day 273)												
Jerry	Evicted (Day 189)			Exempt	Zoya	Nominated	Evicted (Day 273)												
Zoya	Not in House	Mario	Sandra L.	Exempt	Michael H.	Evicted (Day 252)													
Mark	Lydija	Mario	Sandra L.	Nominated	Evicted (Day 252)														
Petra	Not in House			Ejected (Day 250)															
Sandra L.	Michele	Franziska	Geraldine	Evicted (Day 245)															
Solveigh	Not in House	Mario	Sandra L.	Walked (Day 244)															
Mario	?	Solveigh	Evicted (Day 231)																
Miriam	Michele	Ejected (Day 224)																	
Michele	Lydija	Evicted (Day 217)																	
Christian	Evicted (Day 210)																		
Audience	No public nominations			Daniela; 10% to save Mark; 12.5% to save	No public nominations	Nicole H. 3.5% to save Jerry; 10% to save	Katrin; 4% to save Nicole H. 6.4% to save Toni; 14.5% to save	Eric; 4.5% to save Lelo; 5.9% to save Nicole H. 7.6% to save	No public nominations		Isabel; Lelo; Peggy	Daniela; Geraldine; Jupp	Natalie; Nicole H. Peggy	Daniela; Lelo; Toni	Daniela; Natalie; Toni	No public nominations			
Up for eviction	Lydija; Michele	Mario; Solveigh	Geraldine; Sandra L.	Carsten; Daniela; Mark	Daniela; Zoya	Jerry; Lydija; Nicole H.	Katrin; Nicole H. Toni	Eric; Lelo; Nicole H.	Carsten; Daniela; Franziska; Geraldine; Isabel; Lelo; Marcus; Michael H. Nicole H. Peggy; Rolf; Sascha S. Toni	Carsten; Daniela; Franziska; Geraldine; Isabel; Lelo; Marcus; Michael H. Natalie; Nicole H. Peggy; Sascha S. Toni	Isabel; Lelo; Peggy	Daniela; Geraldine; Jupp	Natalie; Nicole H. Peggy	Daniela; Lelo; Toni	Daniela; Natalie; Toni	Natalie; Toni	Carsten; Jupp; Nicole H. Toni	Carsten; Franziska; Jupp; Michael H. Sascha S. Toni	Franziska; Sascha S.
Evicted	Michele; 36.8% to save	Mario; 43.6% to save	Sandra L. 43.7% to save	Mark; 16.6% to save	Zoya; 13.6% to save	Jerry; 15.3% to save	Katrin; 7.7% to save	Eric; 11.5% to save	Rolf; 1.09% to save	Marcus; 1.60% to save	Isabel; 22.7% to save	Geraldine; 23.7% to save	Peggy; 20.7% to save	Lelo; 9.5% to save	Daniela; 22.2% to save	Natalie; 29.7% to save	Nicole H. 18.7% to save	Toni; 2.3% (out of 6)	Franziska; 47.47% (out of 2)
Evicted	Michele; 36.8% to save	Mario; 43.6% to save	Sandra L. 43.7% to save	Mark; 16.6% to save	Zoya; 13.6% to save	Jerry; 15.3% to save	Katrin; 7.7% to save	Eric; 11.5% to save	Rolf; 1.09% to save	Marcus; 1.60% to save	Isabel; 22.7% to save	Geraldine; 23.7% to save	Peggy; 20.7% to save	Lelo; 9.5% to save	Daniela; 22.2% to save	Natalie; 29.7% to save	Nicole H. 18.7% to save	Carsten; 7.9% (out of 5)	Franziska; 47.47% (out of 2)
Evicted	Michele; 36.8% to save	Mario; 43.6% to save	Sandra L. 43.7% to save	Mark; 16.6% to save	Zoya; 13.6% to save	Jerry; 15.3% to save	Katrin; 7.7% to save	Eric; 11.5% to save	Rolf; 1.09% to save	Marcus; 1.60% to save	Isabel; 22.7% to save	Geraldine; 23.7% to save	Peggy; 20.7% to save	Lelo; 9.5% to save	Daniela; 22.2% to save	Natalie; 29.7% to save	Nicole H. 18.7% to save	Jupp; 15.7% (out of 4)	Sascha S. 52.53% to win
Evicted	Michele; 36.8% to save	Mario; 43.6% to save	Sandra L. 43.7% to save	Mark; 16.6% to save	Zoya; 13.6% to save	Jerry; 15.3% to save	Katrin; 7.7% to save	Eric; 11.5% to save	Rolf; 1.09% to save	Marcus; 1.60% to save	Isabel; 22.7% to save	Geraldine; 23.7% to save	Peggy; 20.7% to save	Lelo; 9.5% to save	Daniela; 22.2% to save	Natalie; 29.7% to save	Nicole H. 18.7% to save	Michael H. 28.7% (out of 3)	Sascha S. 52.53% to win

== See also ==
- Main Article about the show
