= Big Brother (Danish TV series) season 6 =

Big Brother
- Season 6
- No. of days: 119
- No. of housemates: 22
- Winner: David
- Runner-up: Nirvana

Season chronology
- ← Previous; Season 5

Big Brother was the sixth season of the Danish reality television series Big Brother and the third and final season to air on Kanal 5, produced by Endemol. The housemates entered on 30 December 2013, with the launch show airing on 1 January 2014 running for 119 days concluding on 27 April 2014 making it the longest series of Big Brother to air in Denmark to date. David Feldstedt was announced as the winner of the season on 27 April 2014.

On 19 June 2014 Kanal 5 announced that they had axed Big Brother in Denmark after three years on the channel.

== Housemates ==
For the first time in Denmark, each housemate had a secret, based on the original format Secret Story.

=== Andreas ===
Andreas Ahrenskjær is 21 and is from Ballerup.

=== Camilla ===
Camilla B. Nielsen was a previous housemate in Big Brother 2013. She is 38 and is from Frederiksberg.

=== Cecilie ===
Cecilie Nielsen is 19 and is from Farum.

=== David ===
David Feldstedt was a previous housemate in Big Brother 2013. He is 33 and is from Skovlunde.

=== Frida ===
Frida Susan Møller is 21 and is from Mariager.

=== Ginna ===
Ginna Bennet is 24 and is from Greve Strand.

- Secret: "I believe in spirits and ghosts."

=== Jimmi ===
Jimmi Jacobsen is 30 and is from Nakskov.

=== Jonathan ===
Jonathan Jensen is 18 and is from Ballerup.

=== Johannes ===
Johannes Poulsen is 22 and is from Copenhagen.

=== Karoline ===
Karoline Zederkopff is 20 and is from Kirke Hyllinge.

- Secret: "I spent 10,000 kr on Pokemon."

=== Karsten ===
Karsten Nielsen is 31 and is from Østerbro.

- Secret: "I party with my mom at Sunny Beach."

=== Kenneth ===
Kenneth Friis is 28 and is from Greve Strand.

=== Klaus ===
Klaus Snedker is 32 and is from Rødovre.

- Secret: "I slept with one of my mom's friend."

=== Mark ===
Mark Bøgelund is 19 and is from Vestamager.

=== Nicki ===
Sabina Nikita "Nicki" Barth is 20 and is from Nørrebro.

- Secret: "I could kill with her bow and arrow when she was playing role-playing."

=== Nirvana ===
Nirvana Kelecija is 29 and is from Odense.

- Secret: "Hendes ældste fisse er gammel"

=== Patrich ===
Patrich Jensen is 22 and is from Brøndby.

=== Rasmus ===
Rasmus Kiærskou is 24 and is from Sydhavnen.

- Secret: "My biggest idol is Ole Henriksen."

=== Ronnie ===
Ronnie Bruun is 33 and is from Køge.

=== Sabina ===
Sabina is 24 and is from Copenhagen.

- Secret: "I have been in a relationship for 12 years and have a 5 years old daughter."

=== Sandra ===
Sandra Svensson is 24 and is from Vanløse.

- Secret: "I'm got a dildo from my parents."

== Secrets ==
As a twist in the first week, females had to guess correctly all male secrets if they wanted to be immune. It did not happen, so the male were immune. In the second week it was supposed that the males guess the female secrets, however, after Sabina revealed her secret, the twist of guessing the secrets was canceled.

Secret	Housemate
I have been in a relationship for 12 years and have a 5 years old son	Sabina
I believe in spirits and ghosts	Ginna
I spent 10,000 kr on Pokémon	Karoline
I party with my mom at Sunny Beach	Karsten
I slept with one of my mom's friend	Klaus
I played the role play and was an elf	Nicki
My biggest idol is Arnold Schwarzenegger	Nirvana
My biggest idol is Ole Henriksen	Rasmus
I'm got a dildo from my parents	Sandra
I've been ufaithfull on all my girlfriends - and they do not know	Johannes
I've been to numerologist and is no longer called Nicklas	Patrich
I always sleep with the lights on, because I'm afraid of the dark	Jimmi
I am dog agility trainer	Mark

== Nominations table ==
The first nomination is for 2 points, and the second one is for 1 point.

	Week 1	Week 2	Week 3	Week 4	Week 5	Week 6	Week 7	Week 8	Week 9	Week 10	Week 11	Week 12	Week 13	Week 14	Week 15	Week 16	Week 17			
	Week 1	Week 2	Week 3	Week 4	Week 5	Week 6	Week 7	Week 8	Week 9	Week 10	Week 11	Week 12	Week 13	Week 14	Week 15	Week 16	Day 113	Day 114	Finale	
David	Not in House								Mark; Frida	Rasmus; Mark	Ginna; Camilla	Jimmi; Jonathan	Camilla; Nicki	Rasmus; Jimmi	Not; Eligible	Nominated	No; Nominations	Nominated	Winner (Day 119)	
Nirvana	Malene; Sandra	Sandra; Ginna	Sandra; Ginna	Jimmi; Ginna	Sandra; Karoline	No; Nominations	Not; Eligible	Karsten; Cecilie	David; Andreas	David; Ronnie	Mark; Camilla	Jimmi; David	Not; Eligible	Jimmi; Frida	4-Rasmus; 3-Nicki; 2-David	Exempt	No; Nominations	No; Nominations	Runner-Up (Day 119)	
Ronnie	Not in House			Ginna; Jimmi	Sandra; Ginna	No; Nominations	Not; Eligible	Andreas; Jonathan	Mark; Frida	Mark; Jonathan	Ginna; Camilla	Jimmi; Jonathan	Camilla; Nicki	Rasmus; Jimmi	3-Rasmus	Nominated	No; Nominations	No; Nominations	Third place (Day 119)	
Ginna	Sandra; Nicki	Klaus; Sandra	Sandra; Karoline	Kenneth; Jonathan	Karoline; Sandra	No; Nominations	Ronnie; Sandra	Karsten; Jonathan	Camilla; Jonathan	Ronnie; David	Mark; Camilla	Jonathan; Ronnie	Not; Eligible	Mark; Frida	Not; Eligible	Exempt	Nominated	Nominated	Evicted (Day 117)	
Nicki	Malene; Ginna	Sandra; Johannes	Ginna; Sandra	Ginna; Jonathan	Sandra; Ginna	No; Nominations	Evicted (Day 42)				Frida; Camilla	Jonathan; Jimmi	Not; Eligible	Rasmus; Jimmi	Not; Eligible	Exempt	Nominated	Nominated	Re-Evicted (Day 117)	
Frida	Not in House				Exempt	No; Nominations	Not; Eligible	Andreas; Cecilie	Camilla; David	Jonathan; Ronnie	Mark; Ginna	Nicki; Jimmi	Not; Eligible	Jimmi; Mark	Not; Eligible	Exempt	Nominated	Evicted (Day 113)		
Jimmi	Banned	Karoline; Sandra	Sandra; Karoline	Karoline; Kenneth	Karoline; Cecilie	No; Nominations	Not; Eligible	Cecilie; Ronnie	Camilla; David	Ronnie; David	Camilla; Mark	Jonathan; Ronnie	Nirvana; Nicki	Mark; Ronnie	2-Nicki; 1-Frida	Nominated	Evicted (Day 112)			
Rasmus	Banned	Klaus; Sandra	Sandra; Mark	Kenneth; Jonathan	Karoline; Ronnie	No; Nominations	Sandra; Ronnie	Ronnie; Cecilie	Andreas; Frida	Karsten; David	Camilla; Mark	Nicki; Camilla	Nirvana; Nicki	Mark; Ronnie	6-Nicki	Evicted (Day 105)				
Mark	Sabina; Ginna	Sandra; Ginna	Sandra; Ginna	Ginna; Jonathan	Sandra; Ginna	No; Nominations	Ronnie; Sandra	Karsten; Cecilie	Frida; David	David; Karsten	Camilla; Frida	Jonathan; Jimmi	Camilla; Nirvana	Jimmi; David	Evicted (Day 98)					
Camilla	Not in House								Mark; Jonathan	Karsten; Ginna	Mark; Ginna	Ginna; David	Not; Eligible	Evicted (Day 91)						
Jonathan	Not in House			Kenneth; Ginna	Ginna; Sandra	No; Nominations	Not; Eligible	Cecilie; Ronnie	Andreas; Frida	Ronnie; Karsten	Camilla; Mark	Nicki; Ronnie	Evicted (Day 84)							
Cecilie	Not in House				Mark; Ginna	No; Nominations	Andreas; Mark	Jonathan; Andreas	Evicted (Day 56)		Frida; Mark	Re-Evicted (Day 77)								
Karsten	Ginna; Nirvana	Sandra; Johannes	Sandra; Ginna	Kenneth; Jonathan	Karoline; Sandra	No; Nominations	Nominated	Frida; Jonathan	Mark; Frida	Rasmus; Mark	Evicted (Day 70)									
Andreas	Not in House				Exempt	No; Nominations	Ronnie; Sandra	Jonathan; Ronnie	Jonathan; Ginna	Evicted (Day 63)										
Sandra	Malene; Ginna	Karoline; Nicki	Jimmi; Ginna	Jimmi; Nirvana	Mark; Ginna	No; Nominations	Ronnie; Nirvana	Evicted (Day 49)												
Karoline	Sabina; Sandra	Sandra; Klaus	Sandra; Ginna	Kenneth; Ginna	Ginna; Sandra	Evicted (Day 35)														
Kenneth	Not in House		Ginna; Karsten	Jimmi; Karoline	Evicted (Day 28)															
Johannes	Banned	Karoline; Klaus	Nirvana; Sandra	Evicted (Day 21)																
Klaus	Ginna; Sandra	Sandra; Ginna	Evicted (Day 14)																	
Patrich	Banned	Ejected (Day 13)																		
Sabina	Malene; Sandra	Walked (Day 11)																		
Malene	Sabina; Sandra	Evicted (Day 7)																		
Notes	1, 2	none	3	4, 5	none	6	7	none	8, 9	10, 11, 12	13	14, 15	16	17, 18	19	20	21	22	none	
Up for eviction	Ginna; Malene; Sandra	Karoline; Klaus; Sandra	Johannes; Rasmus; Sandra	Ginna; Jimmi; Kenneth	Ginna; Karoline; Sandra	none	Karsten; Ronnie; Sandra	Cecilie; Jonathan; Karsten	Andreas; Camilla; Frida; Mark	David; Karsten; Ronnie	Camilla; Cecilie; Nicki	Jimmi; Jonathan; Nicki	Camilla; Nicki; Nirvana	Jimmi; Mark; Rasmus	David; Nicki; Rasmus	David; Jimmi; Ronnie	Frida; Ginna; Nicki	David; Ginna; Nicki	David; Nirvana; Ronnie	
Walked	none	Sabina	none																	
Ejected	none	Patrich	none																	
Evicted	Malene; Fewest votes to save	Klaus; Fewest votes to save	Johannes; Fewest votes to save	Kenneth; Fewest votes to save	Karoline; Fewest votes to save	Nicki; Automatically evicted	Sandra; Fewest votes to save	Cecilie; Fewest votes to save	Andreas; Fewest votes to save	Karsten; Fewest votes to save	Cecilie; Fewest votes to save	Jonathan; Fewest votes to save	Camilla; Fewest votes to save	Mark; Fewest votes to save	Rasmus; Fewest votes to save	Jimmi; Fewest votes to save	Frida; Ex-housemates' choice to evict	Nicki; Fewest votes to save	Ronnie; Fewest votes to win	Nirvana; Fewest votes to win
Evicted	Malene; Fewest votes to save	Klaus; Fewest votes to save	Johannes; Fewest votes to save	Kenneth; Fewest votes to save	Karoline; Fewest votes to save	Nicki; Automatically evicted	Sandra; Fewest votes to save	Cecilie; Fewest votes to save	Andreas; Fewest votes to save	Karsten; Fewest votes to save	Cecilie; Fewest votes to save	Jonathan; Fewest votes to save	Camilla; Fewest votes to save	Mark; Fewest votes to save	Rasmus; Fewest votes to save	Jimmi; Fewest votes to save	Frida; Ex-housemates' choice to evict	Ginna; Fewest votes to save	David; Most votes to win	

=== Notes ===
- ^Note 1 : As a result of a weekly task, the girls were given secrets and had to put the right secret to the right guy. If they pass it, they would be immune. However, as they failed, the boys were the ones immune.
- ^Note 2 : Patrich, Rasmus, Jimmi and Johannes were banned to vote for talking about nominations. They were still immune.
- ^Note 3 : This week there was a new resident in the house with one of the residents, covert mission - he is in fact a sniper. To stay in the house should sniper shoot (nominate) 3 residents without getting his identity revealed. The sniper will liquidate its victims regularly. A sacrificice a day, three days in a row. During the week, residents gather on various exciting games where potential victims are able to avoid the sniper's shot. Sandra and Karsten won a challenge, and were immune from the sniper. Then, the sniper's victims had to guess who he was in order to escape nominations. They guessed it was Karoline, which is wrong since it is Kenneth. Therefore, Kenneth is immune this week and Johannes and Rasmus are the first housemates to be nominated. Housemates then decided who would be the third nominee nominating another housemate.
- ^Note 4 : The public had to choose between two intruders (Jonathan and Simone) who they wanted to enter. They chose Jonathan.
- ^Note 5 : Nicki, Ronnie, Sandra, Mark, Rasmus and Karsten were the winning team at a task, and won immunity.
- ^Note 6 : Sunday a killer will be released in the Big Brother house. A killer who must select two victims. These victims will need to identify their killer before the week is over. If they guess wrong, they are nominated together with the one they guessed wrong. On Sunday two housemates will be evicted. In case the victims guess right, the killer will be automatically evicted. Sandra and Andreas guessed correctly that it was Nicki, and Nicki was automatically evicted.
- ^Note 7 : For this week, housemates had a task called "Blue Zone vs. Red Zone". They have been divided in two teams, who were: Blue Team (Jonathan, Frida, Jimmi, Nirvana, Ronnie, and Karsten as Captain) and Red Team (Nicki, Mark, Ginna, Cecilie, and Rasmus as Captain). At the end of the task, the Red Team had the most zones of the House. As Captain of the losing team, Karsten is automatically nominated. Then, teams had a last challenge, were the winning team will be the only one able to nominate. Teams have to ride a bicycle for 1 hour and the team who has ride the most kilometers wins the challenge. For having won the most zones, the Red Team has an advantage of 5 minutes bonus. The Red Team won it, and only Ginna, Rasmus, Mark, Andreas, Sandra and Cecilie can nominate this week.
- ^Note 8 : Camilla and David had the power to give immunity to more 3 housemates, with will be revealed until the nominations. They chose first Karsten, second Jimmi, and last Ronnie.
- ^Note 9 : There was a tie between Andreas and David. As result, each housemate voted for one of them to be nominated. Andreas received 6 nominations (Camilla, David, Frida, Ginna, Jonathan, Karsten and Ronnie), while David received 5 nominations (Andreas, Jimmi, Mark, Nirvana and Rasmus). Therefore, Andreas was nominated.
- ^Note 10 : This week gold budget is about green and red balls. Throughout the week it is so for the housemates of winning as many green balls as possible to fill in the box, so as to get the odds done better for themselves. Green balls they can win through a number of challenges during the week. But Big Brother is insidious and has a lot of personal temptations in store for the various residents. Temptations, which of course costs in the form of red balls to the box. Housemates were offered 3 cards that would give extra points for Friday's nomination. One of 3 extra points, other of 2 extra points and another of 1 extra point. Each card will give them as many red balls as extra points. David took the 3 extra point card. He gave 2 extra points to Rasmus (so, he gave 4 points in total to him) and 1 extra point to Mark (so, he gave 2 points in total to him).
- ^Note 11 : Jimmi won immunity for this week by spinning the wheel of fortune.
- ^Note 12 : There was a tie between Rasmus and Karsten. As result, each housemate voted for one of them to be nominated. Karsten received 7 nominations (Camilla, Ginna, Jimmi, Jonathan, Mark, Nirvana and Rasmus), while Rasmus received 4 nominations (David, Frida, Karsten and Ronnie). Therefore, Karsten was nominated.
- ^Note 13 : Big Brother informed that Cecilie and Nicki have been automatically nominated after they came back to the House. However, if they end up in the Top 3 pairs for this task, they will no longer be nominated and they will be able to give the automatic nomination to another pair in the Bottom 3. Jonathan & Nirvana, David & Ronnie and Rasmus & Jimmi were on the Top 3, were immune for this week. Camilla & Mark and Frida & Ginna are the only ones that can be nominated for finishing in the Bottom 3, as Cecilie and Nicki are automatically nominated for don't be in the Top 3.
- ^Note 14 : After winning previous challenges, Camilla, Frida and Ginna competed in a balance challenge to win immunity. Frida stayed there the most time, and won immunity.
- ^Note 15 : This week, as part of the weekly task, there was a wheel of fortune in the living room and the housemates could turn it. Whoever's face it landed on would get an extra point. Jimmi received 3 extra points, Jonathan and David received 2 extra points, Ginna, Rasmus, Ronnie and Nirvana received 1 extra point, while Mark, Camilla and Nicki did not receive any.
- ^Note 16 : This week, the weekly task was Boys versus Girls. During the week, they competed in various tasks, and the team with the most points would be the only one that could nominate. However, in the end, there was a tie in the points. As a result, it was held a culture quiz as tie-breaker. The boys won it, and are the only ones that can nominate this week.
- ^Note 17 : Housemates could win immunity if they hit the gong. However, for that, they had to prevent one housemate from getting his family visit. Nicki hit the gong, and decided that Frida wouldn't get a family member in the house.
- ^Note 18 : This week, the family of the housemates nominates instead of them.
- ^Note 19 : This week, the housemates will win points in challenges to nominate. They could nominate one housemate with all their points, or they could distribute them. Nirvana had 9 points, Rasmus had 6, Jimmi and Ronnie had 3, while David, Frida, Ginna and Nicki did not won any point. Therefore, they did not nominated.
- ^Note 20 : Everyone was put up for eviction at the start of the week. However, 4 of the housemates will be saved, by winning challenges, and will be finalists of the season. The 3 that are not saved will be nominated. Frida won a challenge, and was the first to be saved, and win immunity. Ronnie won the next immunity challenge. However, as Nirvana guessed he would win the challenge, the immunity went for her, and is the second housemate saved. David lost the next challenge, and therefore was the first nominated housemate. Ronnie won the next challenge, and had the power to choose the second nominee. He chose Jimmi. The next challenge had as winner Ginna, and she became the third housemate saved. In the next challenge, Nicki won Ronnie, who became a nominee. However, David or Jimmi could beat Nicki, and win immunity. In a challenge between them, Jimmi won, and had a challenge against Nicki. David was nominated. In that challenge, Nicki won, and is the last housemate saved. Jimmi is nominated.
- ^Note 21 : One day after Jimmi's eviction, another housemate was evicted. There was opened a vote on Facebook. David, Ronnie and Nirvana received the most votes, and were saved from the eviction. Previously, the public voted 5 ex-housemates to be back as guests (Mark, Karsten, Cecilie, Rasmus and Jonathan). They decided as a group to evict Frida.
- ^Note 22 : Housemates will have the lives of each other into their own hands. Starting at 1:00pm they will have to give "Death" to one another, and they have to keep it for a certain number of minutes before giving it to another housemate. Then, the viewers chose 3:15pm as the time when the housemates holding the "Death" will be the next housemate nominated. But, one housemate can also decide to sacrifice the housemate he/she holds the life of. While this was going on, Ginna decided to sacrifice Nicki's life. She then became the first nominee. At 3:15pm, David had the "Death" and became the second nominee. After this, Ginna, Nirvana and Ronnie had a last challenge, the loser of which would be the last nominee. They had to add helium to a balloon, and the one who made it blow up was the loser of the challenge. Ginna made it blow, she is the last housemate nominated then. It was a double eviction.

=== Nominations total received ===
	Week 1	Week 2	Week 3	Week 4	Week 5	Week 6	Week 7	Week 8	Week 9	Week 10	Week 11	Week 12	Week 13	Week 14	Week 15	Week 16	Week 17			Total
David	Not in House								5+5	7	–	4	0	1	2	–	–	–	Winner	24
Nirvana	1	0	2	1	0	–	1	0	0	0	–	1	5	0	0	–	–	–	Runner-Up	11
Ronnie	Not in House			–	1	–	9	5	–	8	–	4	0	2	0	–	–	–	3rd Place	29
Ginna	7	3	9	9	9	–	0	0	1	1	6	3	0	0	0	–	–	–	Evicted	47
Nicki	1	1	0	–	0	–	Evicted				–	6	4	–	11	–	–	–	Re-Evicted	23
Frida	Not in House				–	–	0	2	7	0	5	–	0	2	1	–	–	Evicted		17
Jimmi	–	0	2	7	0	–	0	0	–	–	–	12	0	9	0	–	Evicted			30
Rasmus	–	0	–	–	0	–	0	0	0	6+4	–	0	0	6	7	Evicted				23
Mark	–	0	1	–	4	–	1	0	8	5	12	0	0	7	Evicted					38
Camilla	Not in House								6	0	13	1	6	Evicted						26
Jonathan	Not in House			5	0	–	0	7	4	3	–	12	Evicted							31
Cecilie	Not in House				1	–	0	8	Evicted		–	Re-Evicted								9
Karsten	–	0	1	–	0	–	–	6	–	6+7	Evicted									20
Andreas	Not in House				–	–	2	5	5+6	Evicted										18
Sandra	7	15	16	–	12	–	5	Evicted												55
Karoline	0	6	2	3	9	Evicted														20
Kenneth	Not in House		–	11	Evicted															11
Johannes	–	2	–	Evicted																2
Klaus	–	6	Evicted																	6
Patrich	–	Ejected																		N/A
Sabina	6	Walked																		6
Malene	8	Evicted																		8
