= La granja (Chilean TV series) =

- Title card
- Genre: Reality television
- Created by: Strix
- Based on: Farmen
- Developed by: Nicolas Quesille
- Presented by: Sergio Lagos
- Opening theme: "El juego verdadero" by Tiro de Gracia
- Country of origin: Chile
- Original language: Spanish
- No. of episodes: 70

Production
- Executive producer: Nicolas Quesille
- Production locations: Pirque, Chile
- Running time: 60-90 minutes
- Production companies: Corporación de televisión de la Pontificia Universidad Católica de Chile; Promofilm

Original release
- Network: Canal 13
- Release: January 4 – April 19, 2005

Related
- La Granja VIP; Granjeras

La granja (lit:The Farm) is a Chilean reality television programme aired on Canal 13 from 4 January to 19 April 2005, coproduced with Promofilm. The series is based on the original Swedish television show Farmen and it was presented by Sergio Lagos.

== Finishing order ==
Contestant	Original team	Episode 8-11 Team	Merged team	Finish
Vannia Martínez Fuenzalida; 22, Viña del Mar	Red			1st Evicted; Day ??
Javier Andrés Figueroa Mella; 28, Concepción	Red			3rd Evicted; Day ??
Lorena Berríos; 21	Blue			4th Evicted; Day ??
Matías Iriarte; 20	Blue			Left Voluntary; Day ??
Paula Angélica Blanco Muñoz; 28, Valparaíso	Blue			Left Voluntary; Day ??
Hércules Souza; 21, Coquimbo	Blue			6th Evicted; Day ??
Flavia Beltrami; 42	Red	Orange		7th Evicted; Day ??
Marcela Alejandra Centeno Rosati; 24, Santiago	Red	Green		8th Evicted; Day ??
Nabih Chadud; 27, Santiago	Red	Green		9th Evicted; Day ??
Marko Marinkovic; 46	Blue	Orange		2nd Evicted; Day ?? 10th Evicted; Day ??
Eileen Aguilar; 22	Blue	Orange	White	11th Evicted; Day ??
María Victoria Lissidini; 19, Santiago	Red	Green	White	12th Evicted; Day ??
María Gloria Cortés Weiss; 20, Santiago	Blue	Green	White	5th Evicted; Day ?? 13th Evicted; Day ??
Arturo Longton; 26, Reñaca	Red	Orange	White	3rd Place; Day ??
Álex José Gerhard Mujica; 37, Providencia	Red	Orange	White	Runner-Up; Day ??
Gonzalo Egas Pourailly; 29, Santiago	Blue	Green	White	Winner; Day ??

== Nominations ==
	Round 1	Round 2	Round 3	Round 4	Round 5	Round 6	Round 7	Round 8	Round 9	Round 10	Round 11	Round 12	Round 13	Round 14	Final
Farm Leader	Gonzalo	Vicky	Arturo	Arturo	Eileen	Gloria	Nabih	Gonzalo	Arturo	Alex	Eileen	Vicky	Arturo	Gonzalo	-
Immunity	Blue	Red	Blue	Red	Red	Red	Red	Green	Orange	Orange	Green	Gloria	Arturo	-	-
Gonzalo	Arturo	-	Javier	-	-	-	-	Arturo	-	-	Alex	Eileen	Alex		'Winner'
Álex	-	Marko	-	Lorena	Matías	Hércules	Gonzalo	-	Nabih	Nabih	-	Eileen	Gonzalo		'Runner-Up'
Arturo	-	Gonzalo	-	Gonzalo	Gonzalo	Gonzalo	Gonzalo	-	Gonzalo	Nabih	-	Eileen	Alex		'3rd Place'
Gloria			Marcela	-	-	-	-	Arturo	-	-	Marko	Gonzalo	Alex		
Vicky	-	Marko	-	Lorena	Matías	Hércules	Eileen	Flavia	-	-	Alex	Alex	Alex		
Eileen	Nabih	-	Vicky	-	-	-	-	-	Vicky	Gonzalo	-	Gonzalo			
Marko	Alex	-						-	Vicky	Nabih	-				
Nabih	-	Marko	-	Gloria	Matías	Gonzalo	Gonzalo	Alex	-	-					
Marcela	-	Marko	-	Lorena	Matías	Gonzalo	Gonzalo	Arturo	-						
Flavia	-	Gonzalo	-	Gonzalo	Gonzalo	Gonzalo	Gonzalo	-							
Hércules	Vannia	-	Flavia	-	-	-									
Matías	Arturo	-	Flavia	-	-										
Paula	Arturo	-	Nabih	-	-										
Lorena	Marcela	-	Marcela	-											
Javier			-												
Vannia	-														
Nominated	Arturo; 3/7 votes	Marko; 4/6 votes	Marcela; 2/7 votes^{1}	Lorena; 3/6 votes	Matías; 4/6 votes	Gonzalo; 4/6 votes	Gonzalo; 5/6 votes	Arturo; 3/5 votes	Vicky; 2/4 votes	Nabih; 3/4 votes	Alex; 2/3 votes	Eileen; 3/6 votes	Alex; 4/5 votes	-	-
Nominated	Vannia; 72,2%	Gonzalo %	Javier %	Gloria %	Paula %	Hércules %	Gloria %	Flavia %	Marcela; 50.89%	Gonzalo %	Marko; 52.0%	Arturo by Eileen	Vicky by Alex	-	-
Evicted	Vannia	Marko	Javier	Lorena	^{2}	Hércules	Gloria	Flavia	Marcela	Nabih	Marko	Eileen	Vicky	Gloria	-

¹: Flavia and Marcela tied for votes from their peers. Arturo, a foreman, had to choose the first nominee.
²: Matías and Paula did not want to grieve and both left the farm.
