= Farmi Suomi: Revanssi =

- Season 6
- Presented by: Susanna Laine
- No. of days: 30
- No. of castaways: 14
- Winner: Kirsikka Simberg
- Runner-up: Katri Utula
- Location: Pieksämäki, Finland

Release
- Original network: Nelonen
- Original release: 14 October – 16 December 2024

Season chronology
- ← Previous; Farmi Suomi 2024 Next → Farmi Suomi 2025

Farmi Suomi: Revanssi (The Farm Finland: Revenge) is the sixth season of the Finnish version of The Farm. 12 former contestants who've never won return to the farm in Pieksämäki, Finland where they once again live as it was a century prior and compete in duels whilst trying to be the last farmer standing. Susanna Laine returns to host, moderating the farm and hosting duels until one remains to win the €30,000 grand prize. The season premiered on Nelonen on 14 October 2024. The season concluded on 16 December 2024 where Kirsikka Simberg in a tight final duel against Katri Utula to win the grand prize and be crowned the winner.

== Finishing order ==
(age are stated at time of competition)

| Contestant | Age | Background | Season | Entered | Exited | Status | Finish |
|---|---|---|---|---|---|---|---|
| Luyeye "Seksikäs-Suklaa" Konssi | 32 | Rapper | 2020 | Day 1 | Day 3 | 1st Evicted; Day 3 | 14th |
| Timo Lavikainen | 50 | Actor | 2021 | Day 2 | Day 6 | 2nd Evicted; Day 6 | 13th |
| Iida Vainio | 20 | Influencer | 2024 | Day 1 | Day 8 | Quit; Day 8 | 12th |
| Antonio Flores | 46 | Hair Stylist | 2023 | Day 1 | Day 9 | 3rd Evicted; Day 9 | 11th |
| Jaakko Parkkali | 28 | YouTuber | 2020 | Day 1 | Day 9 | 4th Evicted; Day 9 | 10th |
| Kelly Kalonji | 29 | Model | 2022 | Day 1 | Day 12 | 5th Evicted; Day 12 | 9th |
| Juha Mieto | 74 | Former cross-country skier | 2020 | Day 1 | Day 15 | 6th Evicted; Day 15 | 8th |
| Mikael Jungner | 59 | Former Politician | 2021 | Day 7 | Day 18 | 7th Evicted; Day 18 | 7th |
| Raija Pelli | 66 | TV Presenter | 2023 | Day 1 | Day 21 | 8th Evicted; Day 21 | 6th |
| Henny Harjusola | 30 | Beauty Blogger | 2022; 2023 | Day 1 | Day 27 | 9th Evicted; Day 27 | 5th |
| Jani "Wallu" Valpio | 50 | Culture Presenter | 2024 | Day 1 | Day 27 | 10th Evicted; Day 27 | 4th |
| Susanna "Suski" Penttilä | 51 | Fashion Entrepreneur | 2023 | Day 1 | Day 30 | 11th Evicted; Day 30 | 3rd |
| Katri Utula | 43 | Supplier | 2023 | Day 1 | Day 30 | Runner-up; Day 30 | 2nd |
| Kirsikka Simberg | 37 | Influencer | 2024 | Day 1 | Day 30 | Winner; Day 30 | 1st |

== The game ==
| Week | Farmer of the Week | 1st Dueler | 2nd Dueler | Evicted | Finish |
|---|---|---|---|---|---|
| 1 | None (Note: This week, the farmers were grouped in pairs and had to compete for their right to stay on the farm.) | Kirsikka | Luyeye | Luyeye | 1st Evicted; Day 3 |
| 2 | Henny | Timo | Katri | Timo | 2nd Evicted; Day 6 |
| 3 | Juha | Antonio; Susanna (Note: For week 3, Juha as the Head of the Farm had to nominate two duelers for the duel. In turn, Antonio and Susanna who were picked, decided their opponents for the duel.) | Raija; Jaakko | Iida | Quit; Day 8 |
| 3 | Juha | Antonio; Susanna | Raija; Jaakko | Antonio | 3rd Evicted; Day 9 |
| 3 | Juha | Antonio; Susanna | Raija; Jaakko | Jaakko | 4th Evicted; Day 9 |
| 4 | Raija | Katri | Kelly | Kelly | 5th Evicted; Day 12 |
| 5 | Katri | Juha | Henny | Juha | 6th Evicted; Day 15 |
| 6 | Wallu | Mikael | Kirsikka | Mikael | 7th Evicted; Day 18 |
| 7 | Katri | Raija | Susanna | Raija | 8th Evicted; Day 21 |
| 8 | Wallu | Henny | Katri | Katri | Won Advantage; Day 24 (Note: Unbeknownst to the contestants, the duelists chosen were competing for an advantage to help them in the finals.) |
| 9 | None | All | | Henny | 9th Evicted; Day 27 |
| 9 | None | All | | Wallu | 10th Evicted; Day 27 |
| 10 | Jury | Kirsikka | Susanna | Susanna | 11th Evicted; Day 30 |
| 10 | Jury | Katri | Kirsikka | Katri | Runner-up; Day 30 |
| 10 | Jury | Katri | Kirsikka | Kirsikka | Winner; Day 30 |
