= Farmi Suomi 2021 =

- Season 2
- Presented by: Ellen Jokikunnas
- No. of days: 30
- No. of castaways: 13
- Winner: Timo Lavikainen
- Runner-up: Mikael Jungner
- Location: Pieksämäki, Finland

Release
- Original network: Nelonen
- Original release: 4 April – 6 June 2021

Season chronology
- ← Previous; Farmi Suomi 2020 Next → Farmi Suomi 2022

Farmi Suomi 2021 (The Farm Finland 2021) is the second season of the Finnish version of The Farm. The season returns to the farming estate in Pieksämäki, Finland where 13 Finnish celebrities live on a farm like it was a century prior and compete in challenges to complete weekly tasks and survive duels. Ellen Jokikunnas returns to host for the first time since 2014 where she host duels and presents the contestants as they compete to try and win €30,000. The season premiered on 4 April 2021 on Nelonen and concluded on 6 June 2021 where actor Timo Lavikainen won in the final duel against former politician Mikael Jungner to win the grand prize and the title of Farmi Suomi 2021.

== Finishing order ==
(age are stated at time of competition)

Contestant	Age	Background	Entered	Exited	Status	Finish
Janne Ahonen	43	Former Ski Jumper	Day 1	Day 3	1st Evicted; Day 3	13th
Dan "Uniikki" Tolppanen	39	Rapper	Day 1	Day 6	2nd Evicted; Day 6	12th
Sanna Ukkola	45	Journalist	Day 1	Day 9	3rd Evicted; Day 9	11th
Tuuli Oikarinen	21	Singer	Day 1	Day 12	4th Evicted; Day 12	10th
Noora Toivo	31	Sprinter	Day 1	Day 15	5th Evicted; Day 15	9th
Pierlin "Pastori Pike" Makumbu	32	Rapper	Day 1	Day 18	6th Evicted; Day 18	8th
Anni Harjunpää	24	Model	Day 1	Day 21	7th Evicted; Day 21	7th
Pia Nykänen	50	Nanny	Day 1	Day 24	8th Evicted; Day 24	6th
Timo "Juti" Jutila	56	Former Hockey Player	Day 10	Day 24	9th Evicted; Day 24	5th
Michelle "Minttu" Murphy-Kaulanen	40	Lapland CEO	Day 1	Day 27	10th Evicted; Day 27	4th
Sauli Koskinen	35	Reality TV Personality	Day 1	Day 30	11th Evicted; Day 30	3rd
Mikael Jungner	55	Former Politician	Day 1	Day 30	Runner-up; Day 30	2nd
Timo Lavikainen	46	Actor	Day 1	Day 30	Winner; Day 30	1st

== The game ==
Week	Farmer of the Week	1st dueler	2nd dueler	Evicted	Finish
1	Noora	Mikael	Janne	Janne	1st Evicted; Day 3
2	Timo	Mikael	Uniikki	Uniikki	2nd Evicted; Day 6
3	Pastori	Sanna	Pia	Sanna	3rd Evicted; Day 9
4	Mikael	Anni	Tuuli	Tuuli	4th Evicted; Day 12
5	Sauli	Juti	Noora	Noora	5th Evicted; Day 15
6	Anni	Mikael	Pastori	Pastori	6th Evicted; Day 18
7	Timo	Anni	Sauli	Anni	7th Evicted; Day 21
8	Sauli	Mikael	Pia	Pia	8th Evicted; Day 24
8	Sauli	Mikael	Juti	Juti	9th Evicted; Day 24
9	Mikael	Sauli	Minttu	Minttu	10th Evicted; Day 27
10	Jury	Mikael	Sauli	Sauli	11th Evicted; Day 30
10	Jury	Mikael	Timo	Mikael	Runner-up; Day 30
10	Jury	Mikael	Timo	Timo	Winner; Day 30
