= La Granja VIP =

La Granja VIP (Spanish: The Farm VIP) may refer to the following versions of The Farm program:

- La Granja VIP (Chilean TV series), released in 2005
- La Granja VIP (Mexican TV series), released in 2025
