= Caso Cerrado =

American reality court show (2001–2019)

- Also known as: Sala de parejas (formerly)
- Genre: Arbitration-based reality court show
- Created by: Ana María Polo
- Starring: Ana María Polo
- Country of origin: United States
- Original language: Spanish
- No. of episodes: 1578

Production
- Executive producer: Marlene Key
- Running time: 60–65 minutes (including commercials)

Original release
- Network: Telemundo
- Release: April 2, 2001 – December 10, 2019

Caso cerrado (Case Closed), formerly Sala de parejas (Couples' Court), is an American Spanish language arbitration-based reality court show that aired on Telemundo from 2001 to 2019 in which Cuban-American lawyer Ana María Polo arbitrates cases for volunteer participants.

== Description ==
The show began running on April 2, 2001, and originally dealt with the arbitration of marital problems between litigants. The show was originally called Sala de parejas (Couple's Court) until April 2005, when it was expanded to include other disputes not related to marital issues, such as violence and child abuse, and occasional segments where Polo seeks to educate the audience about issues related to the law. Along with the show's new format and new content added, production decided it was necessary to rename it. Caso Cerrado, the second and current show title, refers to the phrase Polo says at the end of every case, which is usually accompanied by the strike of a gavel.

On each show, Polo usually takes up to two cases (three cases prior to 2008) with conflicting guests and attempts to solve them through arbitration. Polo does not function as a judge, but as an arbitrator to settle differences between litigants. Before participating, guests are required to sign contracts agreeing to recognize and comply with Polo's decision.

Until 2006, the show was produced by Promofilm Estados Unidos. It is now solely produced by Telemundo. The network does provide alternate English language closed captioning for the program on the CC3 caption channel.

== Recognition ==
In 2010, Caso cerrado made history by becoming the first show on a Spanish-spoken broadcasting company to be nominated for an Emmy award. Ana María Polo was nominated for an episode of the series that covered a family's special case in which a horse was purchased under false pretenses.

== Criticism ==
Caso cerrado has been criticized over the veracity of the cases and situations introduced in the show. In the end credits, a disclaimer is presented stating that most of the cases are authentic, but dramatized. On January 4, 2009, Ana María Polo stated during an interview with the Chilean newspaper La Tercera, "Most of the cases have to be arranged and modified. It's the message that we send to the audience that really counts." She added that every case is real, however, sometimes actors are used in cases where participants in the dispute do not want to appear on the show.

On a separate 2018 interview with the Sun-Sentinel, Ana María Polo stated that the show was created to entertain but that the participants were not actors. Polo also maintained that the cases were real but not precise, saying "Those participants are not actors. They are people who simply have something to tell and who reflect their realities, even if the story is not completely as it happened to them."

== Broadcast ==
In the United States, where the show is produced, Caso cerrado is broadcast exclusively by Telemundo. According to Businesswire.com, 1,455,000 people tune the show daily, and it's the number one Spanish-spoken show at the 4PM time slot. 39% of the viewers of Caso cerrado are aged among 18 - 34. In addition to Telemundo, the show is also broadcast by several other television networks in Latin America, Spain and Equatorial Guinea and soon to Asia (including Philippines in English subtitles).

== Influence ==
In 2009, Ana María Polo visited Chile to attend several MEGA shows. Due to the success of the Telemundo's original show Caso cerrado in Chile, Caso cerrado Chile began production with Polo as host and has aired on MEGA since September 18, 2009.

After Caso cerrado, many other television court shows have been created in Chile, including Tribunal Oral on Canal 13, Veredicto on Mega, and La jueza on Chilevisión from the former production company of Caso cerrado, Promofilm.

== See also ==
- Judge Judy
- La Corte del Pueblo
- Public Atorni
