= Farma Česko 2026 =

- Season 2
- Presented by: Adam Vacula; Igor Dobeš (Farm mentor)
- No. of days: 40
- No. of castaways: 16
- Winner: Lucie Kotenová
- Runner-up: Zdeněk Slouka
- Location: Central Bohemian Region, Czech Republic

Release
- Original network: TV Nova
- Original release: 22 June – 13 August 2026

Season chronology
- ← Previous; 2025

Farma Česko 2026 is the second season of the Czech version of the reality television series The Farm. The season returns with Adam Vacula now presenting the show alongside new farm mentor Igor Dobeš. 13 Czechs live on a farm as it was a century prior to win tasks and win the grand prize of 1,500,000Kč. The season premiered on TV Nova on 22 June 2026.

== Contestants ==
Contestant	Age	Residence	Entered	Exited	Status	Finish
Lukáš Habich	44	Lupěné	Day 1	Day 5	1st Evicted; Day 5	16th
Matěj Cingroš	23	Nejdek	Day 1	Day 10	2nd Evicted; Day 10	15th
David Tesárek	32	Most	Day 6	Day 15	3rd Evicted; Day 15	14th
Mariana Kořalková	26	Prague	Day 6	Day 15	4th Evicted; Day 15	13th
Karima Turazová	26	Rýmařov	Day 1	Day 15	5th Evicted; Day 15	12th
Filip Valný	28	Stříbro	Day 1	Day 22	Quit; Day 22	11th
Adéla Babínková	19	Prague	Day 1	Day 25	7th Evicted; Day 25	10th
Martina Kick	52	Prague	Day 1	Day 20	6th Evicted; Day 20	9th
Martina Kick	52	Prague	Day 23	Day 27	Quit; Day 27	9th
Erik Císař	24	Kratochvilka	Day 21	Day 30	7th Evicted; Day 30	8th
Markéta Kaplanová	41	Prague	Day 1	Day 35	8th Evicted; Day 35	7th
Charlotte Trejtnarová	20	Prague	Day 1	Day 36	9th Evicted; Day 36	6th
Simona Holubová	28	Prague	Day 1	Day 37	10th Evicted; Day 37	5th
Štěpán Placák	41	Slaný	Day 1	Day 38	11th Evicted; Day 38	4th
Pavel Pešir	24	Prague	Day 1	Day 39	12th Evicted; Day 39	3rd
Zdeněk Slouka	40	Blansko	Day 1	Day 40	Runner-up; Day 40	2nd
Lucie Kotenová	20	Měšice	Day 1	Day 40	Winner; Day 40	1st

== The game ==
Week	Head of Farm	Butlers	1st Dueler	2nd Dueler	Evicted	Finish
1	~~Lukáš~~; Filip (Note: Filip completed a task that enabled him to throw a coup against Lukáš.)	~~Filip~~; Lukáš; Markéta; Štěpán	Lukáš	Lucie	Lukáš	1st Evicted; Day 5
2	Filip	Charlotte; Luice; Simona	Charlotte	Matěj	Matěj	2nd Evicted; Day 10
3	Pavel	Martina; Simona; Zdeněk	Simona	Karima	Karima	3rd Evicted; Day 15
4	Adéla	Markéta; Štěpán; Zdeněk	Zdeněk	Martina	Martina	4th Evicted; Day 20
5						5th Evicted; Day 25
