= Ferma (TV series) =

- Also known as: Ferma vedetelor
- Genre: Reality Show
- Created by: Strix Television; Sony Pictures Television
- Presented by: Iulia Vântur
- Country of origin: Romania
- Original language: Romanian
- No. of seasons: 4
- No. of episodes: 181

Production
- Running time: 90-105 minutes

Original release
- Network: Pro TV
- Release: March 9, 2015

Related
- The Farm

Ferma vedetelor ( English: Celebrity farm) is the current Romanian version of the reality television show The Farm based on the Swedish television series of the same name that was originally created in 2001 by Strix and produced in association with Sony Entertainment and Endemol. The series premiered on March 9, 2015 on Pro TV.

The show is based on a group of celebrities living together twenty-four hours a day in a Farm, isolated from the outside world (primarily from mass media, such as newspapers, telephones, television and the internet) while having all their steps followed by cameras around-the-clock, with no privacy for three months.

The contestants compete for the chance to win the grand prize by avoiding weekly eviction, until the last celebrity remains at the end of the season that can claim the grand prize. The show was presented by Iulia Vântur, Monica Bîrlădeanu and now is presented by Mihaela Rădulescu and Cristi Bozgan

== Format ==
Twelve contestants are cut out from outside world. Each week one contestant is selected the Farmer of the Week. In the first week, the contestants choose the Farmer. Since week 2, the Farmer is chosen by the contestant evicted in the previous week.

=== Nomination Process ===
The Farmer of the Week nominates two people (a man and a woman) as the Buttlers. The others must decide, which Buttler is the first to go to the Battle. That person than choose the second person (from the same sex) for the Battle and also the type of battle (a quiz, extrusion, endurance, sleight). The Battle winner must win two duels. The Battle loser is evicted from the game.

== Season 1 ==
=== Contestants ===
(ages stated are at time of contest)

Contestant	Age	Background	Status	Finish
George Vintilă	44	Actor & DJ	Winner	1st
Vica Blochina	37	Former ballerina	Runner-up	2nd
Augustin Viziru	37	Actor	Disqualified	3rd
Dan Helciug	40	Pop singer & TV Presenter	Semifinalist	4th
Ionuț Iftimoaie	36	Kickboxer	Voted Out	5th
Cristina Cioran	38	TV Presenter & actress	Evicted	6th
Gina Pistol	33	Model	Evicted	7th
Roxana Ionescu	29	TV Presenter	Evicted	8th
Doinița Oancea	32	Actress	Evicted	9th
Dima Trofim	26	Actor & former Lala Band member	Evicted	10th
Corina Drăgulescu	32	Reality TV star	Evicted	11th
Lucian Viziru	38	Pop singer	Evicted	12th
Mioara Velicu	70	Popular Music Singer	Quit	13th
Ștefan Stan	37	Blues-soul singer & TV Presenter	Evicted	14th
Oana Radu	22	Pop singer	Evicted	15th
Tudorel Filimon	61	Actor	Quit	16th

=== Nominations ===
#	Week 1	Week 2	Week 3	Week 4	Week 5	Week 6	Week 7	Week 8	Week 9	Week 10	Week 11	Week 12
Farmer of the Week	Mioara	Dan	Vica	Cristina	Doiniţa	Dima	Augustin	George	Gina	Ionuț	Augustin	All
Servants (Nominated)	Oana; Dima	Augustin Doinița	Roxana Lucian	Lucian Corina	Vica Dan	Cristina Ionuţ	Dima Cristina	Dan Cristina	Augustin Vica	George Gina	Ionuţ Vica	-
George	Debuts (Day 44)							Farmer of the Week		Servant		Winner
Vica			Farmer of the Week		Duelist				Duelist		Duelist	Runner-up
Augustin		Duelist				Duelist	Farmer of the Week		Servant		Farmer of the Week	Disqualified
Dan		Farmer of the Week		Duelist	Servant			Servant				Semifinalist
Ionuț						Duelist	Duelist			Farmer of the Week	Servant	Voted Out (Day 81)
Cristina			Duelist	Farmer of the Week		Servant	Servant	Duelist		Duelist	Evicted (Day 75)	
Gina	Debuts (Day 44)								Farmer of the Week	Evicted (Day 68)		
Roxana	Debuts (Day 15)		Evicted (Day 19)	Returns (Day 44)					Evicted (Day 61)			
Doinița		Servant			Farmer of the Week			Evicted (Day 54)				
Dima	Servant					Farmer of the Week	Evicted (Day 47)					
Corina	Duelist			Servant	Evicted (Day 33)							
Lucian	Debuts (Day 15)		Servant	Evicted (Day 26)								
Mioara	Farmer of the Week	Quit										
Ștefan		Evicted (Day 12)										
Oana	Evicted (Day 5)											
Tudorel	Quit (Day 3)											
1st Nominated (By Group)	Oana	Augustin	Roxana	Lucian	Vica	Ionuţ	Dima	Cristina	Vica	Gina	Vica	-
2nd Nominated (By 1st Nominated)	Corina	Ștefan	Cristina	Dan	Corina	Augustin	Ionuţ	Doiniţa	Roxana	Cristina	Cristina	-
Evicted	Oana	Ștefan	Roxana	Lucian	Corina	Augustin (Not Eliminated)	Dima	Doiniţa	Roxana	Gina	Cristina	-

=== Summary ===
On Day 1, twelve celebrities arrived at the Farm in three groups. At the end of the first day, Mioara became the first Farmer of the Week. On Day 2, Mioara chose to nominate Oana and Tudorel as Buttlers. Because of medical problem, Tudorel was removed from the competition and he was replaced by Dima, who became the new Buttler.

=== The game ===
Week	Farmer of the Week	Buttlers	1st Dueler	2nd Dueler	Evicted	Winner
1	Mioara	~~Tudorel~~; Oana; Dima	Oana (Eliminated)	Corina	Oana	Corina
2	Dan	Doinita; Augustin	Augustin	Stefan (Eliminated)	Ştefan	Augustin
3	Vica	Roxana; Lucian	Roxana (Eliminated)	Cristina	Roxana	Lucian
4	Cristina	Corina; Lucian	Lucian (Eliminated)	Dan	Lucian	Dan
5	Doiniţa	Vica; Dan	Vica	Corina (Eliminated)	Corina	Vica
6	Dima	Cristina; Ionuţ	Ionuţ	Augustin	-	Ionuţ
7	Augustin	Dima; Cristina	Dima (Eliminated)	Ionuţ	Dima	Ionuţ
8	George	Dan; Cristina	Cristina	Doiniţa (Eliminated)	Doiniţa	Cristina
9	Gina	Augustin; Vica	Vica	Roxana (Eliminated)	Roxana	Vica
10	Ionuţ	George; Gina	Gina (Eliminated)	Cristina	Gina	Cristina
11	Augustin	Vica; Ionuţ	Vica	Cristina (Eliminated)	Cristina	Vica

The Eliminated contestants voted for the person who took the fifth place:
- Ionuţ (8 votes: Oana, Lucian, Corina, Dima, Doiniţa, Roxana, Gina, Cristina)
- Vica (3 votes: Tudorel, Mioara, Ştefan)
- Augustin, Dan, George (0 votes)

== Ratings ==
Official ratings are taken from ARMA (Asociaţia Română pentru Măsurarea Audienţelor). the organisation that compiles audience measurement and television ratings in Romania.

Episode	Original airdate	Timeslot (approx.)	Viewers (in millions)	Rank (Night)	Source
1	9 March 2015	Monday 8:30 pm	2.39	#1	
2	10 March 2015	Tuesday 8:30 pm	2.20	#1	
3	11 March 2015	Wednesday 8:30 pm	2.00	#1	
4	12 March 2015	Thursday 8:30 pm	2.10	#1	
5	14 March 2015	Saturday 8:30 pm	1.9	#2	
6	16 March 2015	Monday 8:30 pm	1.9	#2	
7	17 March 2015	Tuesday 8:30 pm	1.9	#1	
8	18 March 2015	Wednesday 8:30 pm	1.9	#1	
9	19 March 2015	Thursday 8:30 pm	2.1	#1	
10	21 March 2015	Saturday 8:30 pm	1.1	#2	
11	23 March 2015	Monday 8:30 pm	1.8	#2	
12	24 March 2015	Tuesday 8:30 pm	1.8	#2	
13	25 March 2015	Wednesday 8:30 pm		#2	
14	26 March 2015	Thursday 8:30 pm	1.9	#2	
15	28 March 2015	Saturday 8:30 pm	1.3	#2	
16	30 March 2015	Monday 8:30 pm	1.9	#2	
17	31 March 2015	Tuesday 8:30 pm	1.7	#2	
18	1 April 2015	Wednesday 8:30 pm	1.9	#2	
19	2 April 2015	Thursday 8:30 pm	1.8	#2	
20	4 April 2015	Saturday 8:30 pm	1.3	#2	
21	6 April 2015	Monday 8:30 pm	2.1	#2	
22	7 April 2015	Tuesday 8:30 pm	1.8	#2	
23	8 April 2015	Wednesday 8:30 pm	1.8	#2	
24	9 April 2015	Thursday 8:30 pm	1.7	#2	
25	11 April 2015	Saturday 8:30 pm	1.8	#2	
26	13 April 2015	Monday 8:30 pm	1.8	#2	
