= The Farm (franchise) =

Reality TV show concept from Sweden

- Created by: Strix
- Original work: Farmen (Sweden)
- Owner: Fremantle
- Years: 2001–present

Films and television
- Television series: The Farm (independent international versions, see below)

Miscellaneous
- Genre: Reality competition
- First aired: 24 September 2001; 25 years ago

The Farm is a reality competition television franchise format created by the Swedish producer Strix. It has over 100 licenses sold around the world and has aired in more than 50 countries. It has been constantly on air somewhere in the world since 2001. The format is distributed by Fremantle.

== Format ==
The Farm puts a group of 12 to 14 people living together on a farm. The contestants must work as a normal farmer, raising animals and doing agriculture. In regular periods of time, one of the contestants is eliminated, usually in a ceremony called The Duel where they compete in a physical endurance, but in some adaptations of the show, it is the viewing audience that decides, by telephone voting, who must leave The Farm.

A celebrity format, with the participants being well-known public figures, is also common.

== International versions ==
Countries with their own version (as of 2016)

As of 2026, there are 201 winners of The Farm format.

: Currently airing

An upcoming season
Status unknown
No longer airing

Country/Region	Official name	Network(s)	Winner(s)	Main Presenter(s)
Albania	Ferma VIP (Celebrity Format)	Vizion Plus; Tring (live)	Season 1, 2024: Dijonis Biba; Season 2, 2025: Gerald "Big Basta" Xhari; Season 3, 2026: Mimoza Ahmeti; Season 4, 2027: Upcoming season	Current; Arbana Osmani (3-); Former; Fjoralba Ponari (1); Luana Vjollca (2)
Arab world	الوادي; Al Wadi (Celebrity Format)	LBC	Season 1, 2005: Meshari El Ballam	Karen Derkaloustian
Baltic states	Farmi (Estonia); Ferma (Latvia); Fermos (Lithuania)	TV3	Season 1, 2003: Una Jēkabsone	Marko Matvere; Artūrs Skrastiņš; Kęstutis Jakštas
Belgium; Netherlands	De Farm	vtm Yorin	Season 1, 2005: Matthijs Vegter	Evi Hanssen; Gijs Staverman
Brazil	A Fazenda (Celebrity Format)	RecordTV	Season 1, 2009: Dado Dolabella; Season 2, 2009: Karina Bacchi; Season 3, 2010: Daniel Bueno; Season 4, 2011: Joana Machado; Season 5, 2012: Viviane Araújo; Season 6, 2013: Bárbara Evans; Season 7, 2014: DH Silveira; Season 8, 2015: Douglas Sampaio; Season 9, 2017: Flávia Viana; Season 10, 2018: Rafael Ilha; Season 11, 2019: Lucas Viana; Season 12, 2020: Jojo Todynho; Season 13, 2021: Rico Melquiades; Season 14, 2022: Bárbara Borges; Season 15, 2023: Jaquelline Grohalski; Season 16, 2024: Sacha Bali; Season 17, 2025: Dudu Camargo; Season 18, 2026: Current season	Current; Adriane Galisteu (13–); Former; Britto Junior (1–7); Roberto Justus (8–9); Marcos Mion (10–12)
Brazil	Fazenda de Verão	RecordTV	Season 1, 2012: Angelis Borges	Rodrigo Faro
Bulgaria	Фермата; Fermata	bTV	Season 1, 2015: Raino Uzunov; Season 2, 2016: Stoyan Spasov; Season 3, 2017: Yani Andreev; Season 4, 2018: Deyan Kamenov; Season 5, 2019: Veselka Marinova; Season 6, 2020: Vanya Ilieva; Season 7, 2021: Zhivka Roleva; Season 8, 2022: Veselka Marinova; Season 9, 2023: Kostadin Velkov; Season 10, 2026: Current season	Current; Krasimir Radkov (10–); Stanislava Gancheva (10–); Yonislav Yotov – Toto (10–); Kristin Yotova (10–); Former; Ivan Hristov (1–9); Andrey Arnaudov (1–9); Gergana Guncheva (9)
Chile	La granja	Canal 13	Season 1, 2005: Gonzalo Egas	Sergio Lagos
Chile	La Granja VIP	Canal 13	Season 2, 2005: Javier Estrada	Sergio Lagos
Chile	Granjeras (Only Women's Contestants)	Canal 13	Season 3, 2005: Angélica Sepúlveda	Sergio Lagos
Chile	La Granja	Chilevisión	Season 1, 2026: Upcoming season	
Colombia	La Granja Tolima (Celebrity Format)	Caracol Televisión	Season 1, 2004: Alejandro Pineda; Season 2, 2010: Benjamín Herrera	Alejandro Martínez (1); Paula Jaramillo (1); Natalia París (2); Mauricio Vélez (2)
Croatia	Farma (Celebrity Format: Season 1-3)	Nova TV; Nova BH (Bosnia and Herzegovina) (6-7); Nova M (Montenegro) (6-7)	Season 1, 2008: Rafael Dropulić; Season 2, 2009: Mario Mlinarić; Season 3, 2010: Kristijan Rahimovski; Season 4, 2015: Blaženka Slamar; Season 5, 2016: Goran Kaleb; Season 6, 2018: Saša Vujnović; Season 7, 2020: Tomislav Pavlović	Mia Kovačić (1-7); Dražen Kocijan (2); Nikolina Pišek (2-3); Dušan Bućan (4-5); Davor Dretar "Drele" (1, 3, 6)
Croatia	Farma (Celebrity Format: Season 1-3)	RTL	Season 8, 2025: Ivan Rogić	Nikolina Pišek
Czech Republic	Farma	Nova	Season 1, 2012: Michal Páleník	Tereza Pergnerová
Czech Republic	Farma Česko	Nova	Season 1, 2025: Veronika "Veve" Přikrylová; Season 2, 2026: Lucie Kotenová	Current; Adam Vacula (2-); Former; Vilém Šír (1)
Denmark	Farmen	TV3	Season 1, 2004: Thomas Graa; Season 2, 2005: Natanya Sukkot	Sonny Rønne Pedersen (1); Jakob Kjeldbjerg (2)
Denmark	Hjem til gården	TV2	Season 1, 2017: Trine Cecilie Enevoldsen; Season 2, 2018: Jannie Bager Kristensen; Season 3, 2019: Peter Ole Finnemann Viuff; Season 4, 2020: Kasper Gregersen; Season 5, 2021: Simon Borch Rasmussen	Lene Beier
Dominican Republic	La Finca (Celebrity Format)	Antena Latina	Season 1, 2010: Aquiles Correa	Tania Báez
Finland	Farmi	Nelonen	Season 1, 2014: Sanni Korva	Ellen Jokikunnas
Finland	Farmi Suomi (Celebrity Format)	Nelonen	Season 1, 2020: Noora Räty; Season 2, 2021: Timo Lavikainen; Season 3, 2022: Teemu Packalén; Season 4, 2023: Sampo Kaulanen; Season 5, 2024: Sami Jauhojärvi; Season 6, 2024: Kirsikka Simberg; Season 7, 2025: Lloyd Libiso; Season 8, 2026: Jannica Nordberg	Current; Susanna Laine (3-); Former; Juuso Mäkilähde (1); Ellen Jokikunnas (2)
France	La Ferme Célébrités (Celebrity Format)	TF1	Season 1, 2004: Pascal Olmeta; Season 2, 2005: Jordy Lemoine; Season 3, 2010: Mickael Vendetta	Christophe Dechavanne (1–2); Patrice Carmouze (1–2); Benjamin Castaldi (3); Jean-Pierre Foucault (3)
Germany	Die Farm	RTL	Season 1, 2010: Markus Laurenz	Inka Bause
Greece	Η Φάρμα; I Farma	Mega Channel	Season 1, 2002: Rene Pipitsouli; Season 2, 2004: Giannis Pyrgelis	Grigoris Arnaoutoglou (1); Ilias Balasis (2)
Greece	Η Φάρμα; I Farma	ANT1	Season 3, 2021: Kostas Grekas; Season 4, 2021-22: Neophytos Elias	Sakis Tanimanidis
Greece	Η Φάρμα; I Farma	Star Channel	Season 5, 2023: Giorgos Giannakidis; Season 6, 2024: Maria Giannopoulou; Season 7, 2025: Dimitris Zikos	Leonidas Koutsopoulos
Greece	Η Φάρμα των Επωνύμων; I Farma ton Eponimon (Celebrity Format)	Mega Channel	Season 1, 2003: Stathis Aggelopoulos	Grigoris Arnaoutoglou
Hungary	A Farm	Viasat 3	Season 1, 2002: Laci	László M. Miksa
Hungary	Farm	RTL Klub	Season 2, 2016: Gábor Kiss	Anikó Nádai; Zé Fördős
Hungary	Farm VIP (Celebrity Format)	TV2	Season 1, 2020: Zalán Novák; Season 2, 2021: Holló Fehér; Season 3, 2022: Norbert Schóbert Jr. Season 4, 2023: Simon Szabó; Season 5, 2025: Leo Zsolt Nagy; Season 6, 2026: Current season	Zsolt Gáspár; Zsuzsa Demcsák
India	Farm (Celebrity Format)	Colors	Cancelled	Salman Khan
Ireland	Celebrity Farm	RTÉ One	Season 1, 2004: George McMahon	Mairead McGuinness
Italy	La Fattoria (Celebrity Format)	Italia 1 (1); Canale 5 (2–4)	Season 1, 2004: Danny Quinn; Season 2, 2005: Raffaello Tonon; Season 3, 2006: Rosario Rannisi; Season 4, 2009: Marco Baldini	Daria Bignardi (1); Barbara D'Urso (2–3); Paola Perego (4)
Mexico	La Granja VIP (Celebrity Format)	Azteca Uno; Disney+ (live)	Season 1, 2025: Alfredo Adame; Season 2, 2026: Current season	Adal Ramones; Kristal Silva
Norway	Farmen	TV 2	Season 1, 2001: Gaute Grøtta Grav; Season 2, 2003: Bjørn Tore Bekkeli; Season 3, 2004: Snorre Rotbæk; Season 4, 2007: Mikkel Isak Eira; Season 5, 2008: Silje Hvarnes; Season 6, 2010: Leif Birger Mækinen; Season 7, 2011: Tommy Rodahl; Season 8, 2012: Ingvild Skare Thygesen; Season 9, 2013: Morten Heggdal; Season 10, 2014: Magnhild Vik; Season 11, 2015: Eilev Bjerkerud; Season 12, 2016: Laila Lockert; Season 13, 2017: Halvor Sveen; Season 14, 2018: Tonje Frøystad Garvik; Season 15, 2019: Erik Rotihaug; Season 16, 2020: Per Gunvald Haugen; Season 17, 2021: Daniel Godø; Season 18, 2022: Henrik Eijsink; Season 19, 2023: Anders Rydning; Season 20, 2024: Heidi Lereng; Season 21, 2026: Current season	Current; Victor Sotberg (21-); Former; Sarah Natasha Melbye (1); Frithjof Wilborn (2); Gaute Grøtta Grav (3–15); Mads Hansen (16–17); Niklas Baarli (18-20)
Norway	Farmen kjendis (Celebrity Format)	TV 2	Season 1, 2017: Leif Einar Lothe; Season 2, 2018: Pål Anders Ullevålseter; Season 3, 2019: Tiril Sjåstad Christiansen; Season 4, 2020: Erik Alfred Tesaker; Season 5, 2021: Lasse Matberg; Season 6, 2022: Isak Dreyer; Season 7, 2023: Trond Moi; Season 8, 2024: Sondre Mulongo Nystrøm; Season 9, 2025: Kjersti Grini; Season 10, 2026: Sondre Sundby; Season 11, 2027: Upcoming season	Current; Dorthe Skappel (8-); Former; Gaute Grøtta Grav (1–3); Tiril Sjåstad Christiansen (4-7)
Peru	La granja VIP (Celebrity Format)	Panamericana Televisión	Season 1, 2026: Shirley Arica	Ethel Pozo; Yaco Eskenazi
Poland	Farma	Polsat	Season 1, 2022: Kuba "Wojna" Wojnowski; Season 2, 2023: Tomasz Wędzony; Season 3, 2024: Angelika Kałużna; Season 4, 2025: Bronisław "Bandi" Bandyk; Season 5, 2026: Aksel Rumenov; Season 6, 2027: Upcoming season	Marcelina Zawadzka; Ilona Krawczyńska; Milena Krawczyńska (4-)
Portugal	Quinta das Celebridades (Celebrity Format)	TVI	Season 1, 2004: José Castelo Branco; Season 2, 2005: Rute Marques	Júlia Pinheiro; José Pedro Vasconcelos
Portugal	A Quinta (with celebrities and anonymous)	TVI	Season 3, 2015: Kelly Medeiros	Teresa Guilherme
Portugal	A Quinta: O Desafio (Reality All-Stars format)	TVI	Season 1, 2016: Luís Nascimento	Teresa Guilherme
Portugal	Era Uma Vez na Quinta (Anonymous format)	SIC	Season 1, 2024: Rita Caldeira	Andreia Rodrigues
Romania	Ferma vedetelor (1–3) (Celebrity Format) Ferma (4–5) (Celebrity Format)	Pro TV	Season 1, 2015: George Vintilă; Season 2, 2016: Paul Ipate; Season 3, 2018: Tania Popa; Season 4, 2019: Marius Crăciun; Season 5, 2020: Augustin Viziru	Iulia Vântur (1–2); Monica Bîrlădeanu (3); Mihaela Rădulescu (4–5)
Serbia; Bosnia and Herzegovina; Montenegro	Farma (Celebrity Format)	RTV Pink; Pink BH; Pink M Narodna TV	Season 1, 2009: Milan Topalović Topalko; Season 2, 2010: Miloš Bojanić; Season 3, 2010: Katarina Živković; Season 4, 2013: Sulejman Haljevac Memo; Season 5, 2013: Jelena Golubović; Season 6, 2015: Stanija Dobrojević; Season 7, 2016: Jelena Golubović; Season 8, 2024-25: Kristijan Golubović	Aleksandra Jeftanović (1–6); Dušica Jakovljević (6–8); Ognjen Amidžić (Seasons 1–8); Katarina Nikolić (Seasons 7–8); Vladimir Stanojević (7–8); Milica Kon (8)
Slovakia	Farma	Markíza	Season 1, 2011: Andrea Járová; Season 2, 2012: Radomír Spireng; Season 3, 2012: Mário Drobný; Season 4, 2013: Pavol Styk; Season 5, 2014: Lenka Švaralová; Season 6, 2015: Tomáš Mayer; Season 7, 2016: Tomáš Mrva; Season 8, 2017: Miroslav Povec; Season 9, 2017: Šimon Néma; Season 10, 2018: Dominik Porubský; Season 11, 2019: Gabriel Sedláček; Season 12, 2020: Xénia Gregušová; Season 13, 2021: Miroslav Debnár; Season 14, 2022: Filip Jánoš; Season 15, 2023: Lucia Gašparíková; Season 16, 2024: Peter Janiga; Season 17, 2025: Roman Perašín; Season 18, 2026: Current season	Current; Marek Fašiang (14-); Former; Kveta Horváthová (1–9); Eva Evelyn Kramerová (10-13)
Slovenia	Kmetija	POP TV	Season 1, 2007: Daša Hliš; Season 2, 2008: Cirila Jeršin; Season 4, 2011: Matej Drečnik; Season 8, 2017: Milena Žižek; Season 9, 2018: Franko Bajc; Season 10, 2019: Jan Klobasa & Tilen Klobasa; Season 11, 2021: Tilen Brglez; Season 12, 2022: Tom Zupan; Season 13, 2023: Žan Simonič; Season 14, 2024: Tim Novak; Season 15, 2026: Aleksandra April; Season 16, 2027: Upcoming season	Current; Natalija Bratkovič (7-); Former; Špela Močnik (1–2); Lili Žagar (3); Saša Lendero (4–5); Jasna Kuljaj (6)
Slovenia	Kmetija: Nov začetek	Planet TV	Season 5, 2014: Denis Toplak; Season 6, 2015: Fahrudin "Faki" Čaušević; Season 7, 2016: Adriana Košenina	Current; Natalija Bratkovič (7-); Former; Špela Močnik (1–2); Lili Žagar (3); Saša Lendero (4–5); Jasna Kuljaj (6)
Slovenia	Kmetija Slavnih (Celebrity Format)	POP TV	Season 3, 2009: Goran Breščanski	Anja Križnik Tomažin
Spain	La Granja (Celebrity Format)	Antena 3	Season 1, 2004: Loreto Valverde; Season 2, 2005: Miguel Ángel Redondo	Terelu Campos
Spain	Acorralados (Celebrity Format)	Telecinco; La Siete	Season 1, 2011: Nagore Robles	Jorge Javier Vázquez
Spain	Pesadilla en El Paraíso (Celebrity Format)	Telecinco	Season 1, 2022: Víctor Janeiro; Season 2, 2023: Borja Estrada	Lara Álvarez; Carlos Sobera
Sweden	Farmen	TV4	Season 1, 2001: Benny Viberg; Season 2, 2002: Inger Andersson; Season 3, 2003: Veronika Larsson; Season 4, 2004: Pia Flodner; Season 5, 2004: Christian Gergils; Season 6, 2013: Erik Persson; Season 7, 2014: Maria Dahlberg; Season 8, 2015: Örjan Selien; Season 9, 2016: Fredrik Rosenkvist; Season 10, 2017: Niklas Ravnestam; Season 11, 2018: Stefan Eriksson; Season 12, 2019: Tobias Möller; Season 13, 2020: Sofie Hodén; Season 14, 2021: Daniel Tholén; Season 15, 2022: Cecilia Ahlborg; Season 16, 2023: Nebil Davidsson; Season 17, 2024: Levin Larsson; Season 18, 2025: Mikael Andersson; Season 19, 2026: Alexander Söderholm; Season 20, 2027: Upcoming season	Current; Carolina Gynning (20-); Former; Hans Fahlén (1–2); Linda Lindorff (3–4, 6–7); Filippa Lagerbäck (5); Paolo Roberto (8–13); Anna Brolin (14–19)
Sweden	Farmen VIP (Celebrity Format)	TV4	Season 1, 2018: Glenn Hysén; Season 2, 2019: Sigrid Bernson	Paolo Roberto
Turkey	Ünlüler Çiftliği (Celebrity Format)	ATV	Season 1, 2004: Not known Season 2, 2004: Not known Season 3, 2004: Not known	Seray Sever
United Kingdom	The Farm (Celebrity Format)	Five	Season 1, 2004: Jeff Brazier; Season 2, 2005: Keith Harris & Orville the Duck	Ed Hall (1); Colin McAllister (2); Justin Ryan (2)
United Kingdom	Celebs on the Farm (Celebrity Format)	5Star (1–2); MTV (3)	Season 1, 2018: Gleb Savchenko; Celebs on the Ranch, 2019: Louie Spence; Season 2, 2019: Paul Merson; Season 3, 2021: Kerry Katona	Stephen Bailey

=== Current franchises ===
Season currently being aired.
Upcoming season in casting process.
Casting process completed, and ready to be aired shortly after.

Country	Season name	Launch date	Finale date	Days	Contestants	Grand Prize
Albania	Ferma VIP	27 March 2026	15 June 2026	81	30	€200,000
Brazil	A Fazenda	14 September 2026	December 2026		26	R$ 2.000.000
Croatia	Farma	2024	2024			€50,000
Finland	Farmi Suomi	14 October 2024	14 December 2024	30	14	€30,000
Greece	I Farma	15 September 2025	December 2025		22	€50,000
Hungary	Farm VIP	September 2024	November 2024		18	
Mexico	La Granja VIP	6 September 2026	6 December 2026	91	20	$2,000,000
Norway	Farmen	17 September 2024	December 2024		19	
Norway	Farmen kjendis	January 2025	March 2025			
Poland	Farma	16 February 2026	May 2026			PLN 100,000
Portugal	Era Uma Vez na Quinta	7 January 2024	28 April 2024		16	€25,000+
Serbia	Farma	28 September 2024	December 2024			
Slovakia	Farma	2 September 2024	14 December 2024	75	21	€75,000
Slovenia	Kmetija	2 September 2024	12 December 2024	70	20	€50,000
Sweden	Farmen	January 2025	March 2025			500,000kr.
