= Granjeras (TV series) =

Chilean reality television series

- Season 3
- Presented by: Sergio Lagos
- No. of days: 90
- No. of castaways: 16
- Winner: Angélica Sepúlveda
- Runner-up: Débora Cortés Olivares
- Location: Farellones, Chile

Release
- Original network: Canal 13
- Original release: September 26 – December 22, 2005

Season chronology
- ← Previous; Granja VIP

Granjeras was a Chilean reality television and is the third season of The Farm. It was aired from September 26, 2005, to December 22, 2005, by Canal 13 and was produced by Promofilm. It was hosted by Sergio Lagos.

== Contestants ==
Contestant	Age on entry	Residence	Starting Team	Week 2 Team	Week 3 Team	Unification	Entered	Exited	Status	Finish
Sofía Cordero	42	La Florida	Turquoise Team				Day 1	Day 8	1st Evicted; Day 8	16th
Karen Vidal	20	San Miguel	Pink Team	Pink Team			Day 1	Day 10	Quit; Day 10	15th
Paulina Embid Vargas	24	Los Andes	Pink Team	Pink Team			Day 1	Day 10	Quit; Day 10	14th
Soledad Pérez	54	Santiago	Pink Team	Pink Team			Day 2	Day 13	2nd Evicted; Day 13	13th
Yulia Savchenko	23	Santiago			Pink Team		Day 14	Day 35	5th Evicted; Day 35	12th
Constanza Moya	20	Chillán	Turquoise Team	Turquoise Team	Turquoise Team		Day 1	Day 52	6th Evicted; Day 52	11th
Lidia Gutiérrez	22	Viña del Mar	Turquoise Team	Turquoise Team	Turquoise Team		Day 1	Day 59	7th Evicted; Day 59	10th
Karla Casós	29	Santiago	Turquoise Team	Turquoise Team	Turquoise Team		Day 1	Day 28	4th Evicted; Day 28	9th
Karla Casós	29	Santiago	Turquoise Team	Turquoise Team	Turquoise Team		Day 60	Day 63	Medically evacuated Day 60	9th
Rommy Salinas Martínez	23	La Florida	Pink Team	Pink Team	Pink Team	Merged Team	Day 1	Day 66	9th Evicted; Day 66	8th
Paulina Gaete Pûshel	25	Concepción	Pink Team	Pink Team	Pink Team	Merged Team	Day 1	Day 73	10th Evicted; Day 73	7th
Macarena Bernal	22	Iquique	Turquoise Team	Turquoise Team	Turquoise Team	Merged Team	Day 1	Day 80	11th Evicted; Day 80	6th
Isolina Egaña Contreras	32	Macul	Pink Team	Pink Team	Pink Team	Merged Team	Day 1	Day 21	3rd Evicted; Day 21	5th
Isolina Egaña Contreras	32	Macul	Pink Team	Pink Team	Pink Team	Merged Team	Day 60	Day 82	12th Evicted; Day 82	5th
Viví Rodrigues	25	Santiago		Turquoise Team	Turquoise Team	Merged Team	Day 9	Day 60	8th Evicted; Day 60	4th
Viví Rodrigues	25	Santiago		Turquoise Team	Turquoise Team	Merged Team	Day 68	Day 87	13th Evicted; Day 87	4th
Claudia Angélica Camus Said	23	Providencia	Turquoise Team	Turquoise Team	Turquoise Team	Merged Team	Day 1	Day 90	14th Evicted; Day 90	3rd
Débora Cortés Olivares	29	Peñalolén	Pink Team	Pink Team	Pink Team	Merged Team	Day 1	Day 90	Runner-up; Day 90	2nd
Angélica Sepúlveda	24	Yungay			Pink Team	Merged Team	Day 14	Day 90	Winner; Day 90	1st

== Nominations ==
Week	9	2	3	4	5	6	7	8	9	10	11	12
Farm Leader	Karen	Paulina E	Rommy	Débora	Lidia	Lidia	Paulina G	Karla	Macarena	Claudia	Isolina	Viví
Immunity	Pink Team	Turquoise Team	Turquoise Team ilinous	Pink Team	Turquoise Team	Pink Team	Pink Team	Pink Team	Isolina	Macarena	Angélica	Angélica
Angélica			Yulia	Claudia	Rommy	Macarena	Claudia	Viví	Rommy	Paulina G	Claudia	Isolina
Débora	Karla	Paulina G	Yulia	Claudia	Yulia	Macarena	Claudia	Viví	Rommy	Claudia	Claudia	Claudia
Claudia	Karla	Débora	Isolina	Constanza	Yulia	Constanza	Viví	Viví	Débora	Paulina G	Débora	Isolina
Viví		Débora	Isolina	Constanza	Yulia	Constanza	Claudia	Claudia		Paulina G	Débora	Isolina
Isolina	Karla	Débora	Yulia					Viví	Rommy	Claudia	Débora	Claudia
Macarena	Karla	Débora	Isolina	Constanza	Yulia	Constanza	Claudia	Claudia	Débora	Paulina G	Débora	
Paulina G	Karla	Débora	Yulia	Claudia	Yulia	Macarena	Claudia	Viví	Rommy	Claudia		
Rommy	Lidia	Débora	Yulia	Constanza	Yulia	Constanza	Claudia	Viví	Débora			
Karla	Lidia	Débora	Débora	Constanza				Claudia				
Lidia	Karla	Rommy	Isolina	Constanza	Yulia	Constanza	Claudia					
Constanza	Karla	Débora	Isolina	Claudia	Yulia	Macarena						
Yulia			Isolina	Claudia	Paulina G							
Soledad		Débora										
Paulina E	Constanza											
Karen	Karla											
Sofía	Lidia											
Public Nominations	Sofía %	Soledad %	Angélica %	Karla %	Angélica %	Claudia %	Lidia %	Macarena %	Angélica %	Angélica %	Macarena %	Débora %
Contestant Nominations	Karla; 8/12 votes	Débora; 9/11 votes	Isolina; 6/12 votes	Constanza; 6/11 votes	Yulia; 8/10 votes	Constanza; 5/9 votes	Claudia; 7/8 votes	Viví; 6/9 votes	Rommy; 4/7 votes	Paulina G 4/7 votes	Débora; 4/6 votes	Isolina; 3/5 votes
Evicted	Sofía	Soledad	Isolina	Karla	Yulia	Constanza	Lidia	Viví	Rommy	Paulina G	Macarena	Isolina
