= Farmi Suomi 2020 =

- Season 1
- Presented by: Juuso Mäkilähde
- No. of days: 30
- No. of castaways: 12
- Winner: Noora Räty
- Runner-up: Jaakko Parkkali
- Location: Pieksämäki, Finland

Release
- Original network: Nelonen
- Original release: 19 March – 21 May 2020

Season chronology
- Next → Farmi Suomi 2021

Farmi Suomi 2020 (The Farm Finland 2020) is the first season of the Finnish version of The Farm reality television show and the first version of The Farm to air in Finland since 2014. 12 celebrities come to The Farm and compete in challenges to try and live as it was 100 years prior while also trying to be the last farmer standing. The Farm this year is located in Pieksämäki within the South Savo region. The season premiered on 19 March 2020 and concluded on 21 May 2020 when ice hockey goaltender, Noora Räty won the final duel against YouTuber, Jaakko Parkkali to win €30,000 and become the winner of The Farm.

== Finishing order ==
(age are stated at time of competition)

Contestant	Age	Background	Entered	Exited	Status	Finish
Anu Saagim	58	Model	Day 1	Day 3	1st evicted Day 3	12th
Niko Saarinen	33	Reality TV personality	Day 1	Day 6	2nd evicted Day 6	11th
Luyeye "Seksikäs-Suklaa" Konssi	28	YouTuber & rapper	Day 1	Day 9	3rd evicted Day 9	10th
Sara Chafak	29	Model	Day 1	Day 12	4th evicted Day 12	9th
Katja Kätkä	48	Singer	Day 1	Day 15	5th evicted Day 15	8th
Juha Mieto	70	Former cross-country skier	Day 1	Day 18	6th evicted Day 18	7th
Riina-Maija Palander	43	Sales manager	Day 1	Day 21	Left competition Day 21	6th
Amin Asikainen	44	Former boxer	Day 1	Day 24	7th evicted Day 24	5th
Alina Voronkova	25	Model	Day 1	Day 27	8th evicted Day 27	4th
Jari Isometsä	51	Former cross-country skier	Day 1	Day 30	9th evicted Day 30	3rd
Jaakko Parkkali	24	YouTuber	Day 1	Day 30	Runner-up; Day 30	2nd
Noora Räty	30	Ice hockey goaltender	Day 1	Day 30	Winner; Day 30	1st

== The game ==
Week	Farmer of the Week	1st dueler	2nd dueler	Evicted	Finish
1	Jaakko	Anu	Luyeye	Anu	1st evicted Day 3
2	Amin	Niko	Juha	Niko	2nd evicted Day 6
3	Jari	Luyeye	Alina	Luyeye	3rd evicted Day 9
4	Jaakko	Jari	Sara	Sara	4th evicted Day 12
5	Jari & ~~Katja~~ (Note: Jari & Katja were both chosen to be the Head of the Farm. However, only one of them could stay after a team challenge would decide who would stay and who would leave. Jari won the challenge and remained the Head of the Farm. Katja for losing, was eligible to be nominated for the duel.)	Katja	Jaakko	Katja	5th evicted Day 15
6	Noora	Juha	Jaakko	Juha	6th evicted Day 18
7	Amin	Jari	Riina-Maija	Riina-Maija	Left competition Day 21
8	Jari	Amin	Alina	Amin	7th evicted Day 24
9	Jaakko	Noora	Alina	Alina	8th evicted Day 27
10	Jury	Noora	Jari	Jari	9th evicted Day 30
10	Jury	Jaakko	Noora	Jaako	Runner-up; Day 30
10	Jury	Jaakko	Noora	Noora	Winner; Day 30
