= Farmi Suomi 2024 =

- Season 5
- Presented by: Susanna Laine
- No. of days: 30
- No. of castaways: 16
- Winner: Sami Jauhojärvi
- Runner-up: Linnea Vihonen
- Location: Pieksämäki, Finland

Release
- Original network: Nelonen
- Original release: 7 March – 6 June 2024

Season chronology
- ← Previous; Farmi Suomi 2023 Next → Farmi Suomi: Revanssi

Farmi Suomi 2024 (The Farm Finland 2024) is the fifth season of the Finnish version of The Farm. 16 celebrities travel to a farm in Pieksämäki, Finland where they will live on the farm like it was 100 years prior and complete tasks to maintain the farm whilst trying to be the last farmer standing. The winner of the season will win a grand prize of €30,000. The season is hosted again by Susanna Laine and premiered on 7 March 2024 on Nelonen. The season concluded on 6 June 2024 where Sami Jauhojärvi won against Linnea Vihonen to win the grand prize and be crowned the winner of Farmi Suomi 2024.

== Finishing order ==
(age are stated at time of competition)

Contestant	Age	Background	Entered	Exited	Status	Finish
Ilkka "Danny" Lipsanen	80	Singer	Day 1	Day 1	Left Competition; Day 1	16th
Mona Bling	31	Journalist	Day 1	Day 3	1st Evicted; Day 3	15th
Iida Vainio	19	Influencer	Day 1	Day 4	2nd Evicted; Day 4	14th
Archie Cruz	31	Rock Singer	Day 1	Day 6	3rd Evicted; Day 6	13th
Johanna Pakonen	47	Singer	Day 1	Day 9	4th Evicted; Day 9	12th
Sofia Zida	39	Singer	Day 1	Day 18	6th Evicted; Day 18	11th
Enni Koistinen	35	Podcast Host	Day 1	Day 21	Left Competition; Day 21	10th
Miina Äkkijyrkkä	74	Sculptor	Day 1	Day 22	Ejected; Day 23	9th
Jani "Wallu" Valpio	49	Culture Presenter	Day 1	Day 18	7th Evicted; Day 18	8th
Jani "Wallu" Valpio	49	Culture Presenter	Day 23	Day 24	8th Evicted; Day 24	8th
Merja Kyllönen	46	Politician	Day 1	Day 26	9th Evicted; Day 26	7th
Kirsikka Simberg	37	Influencer	Day 1	Day 26	10th Evicted; Day 26	6th
Daniel "Dani" Lehtonen	32	Reality TV Star	Day 1	Day 12	5th Evicted; Day 12	5th
Daniel "Dani" Lehtonen	32	Reality TV Star	Day 23	Day 27	11th Evicted; Day 27	5th
Michael Ntima	31	Entrepreneur	Day 1	Day 28	12th Evicted; Day 28	4th
Veeti Kallio	57	Singer	Day 1	Day 30	13th Evicted; Day 30	3rd
Linnea Vihonen	38	TV Chef	Day 1	Day 30	Runner-up; Day 30	2nd
Sami Jauhojärvi	42	Former cross-country skier	Day 1	Day 30	Winner; Day 30	1st

== The game ==
Week	Farmer of the Week	1st Dueler	2nd Dueler	Evicted	Finish
1	Linnea (Note: Linnea was crowned the Head of the Farm for finishing first in the initial challenge. She did not nominate the duelists for the first duel.)	Danny	Wallu	Danny	Left Competition; Day 1
1	Linnea	Iida	Mona	Mona	1st Evicted; Day 3
1	Linnea	Iida, Miina, Sami, Veeti		Iida	2nd Evicted; Day 4
2	Sami	Archie	Wallu	Archie	3rd Evicted; Day 6
3	Wallu	Miina	Johanna	Johanna	4th Evicted; Day 9
4	Enni	Veeti	Dani	Dani	5th Evicted; Day 12
5	Veeti	Sami	Wallu	Sami	Won Advantage; Day 15 (Note: On the way to the duel, the duelists were informed the duel was taking place away from the arena and that no one would be eliminated. Instead, Sami, as the winner received an advantage where he got to choose his teammates for next week's challenges.)
6	Sami; Wallu	Wallu (Note: As Wallu's team lost the weekly task, he was automatically nominated for the duel.); Sofia	Enni	Sofia	6th Evicted; Day 18
6	Sami; Wallu	Wallu; Sofia	Enni	Wallu	7th Evicted; Day 18
7	Linnea	Merja	Enni	~~Merja~~; Enni (Note: Although Enni won the duel against Merja, Enni decided to Quit the game, allowing Merja to not be eliminated.)	Left Competition; Day 21
8	~~Miina~~; Michael	Dani; Wallu	Sami	Miina	Ejected; Day 23
8	~~Miina~~; Michael	Dani; Wallu	Sami	Wallu	8th Evicted; Day 24
9	None (Note: This week, there were no head of the farm nor eliminations taking place.)	None			None
10	Linnea	Merja	Kirsikka; Veeti	Merja	9th Evicted; Day 26
10	Linnea	Merja	Kirsikka; Veeti	Kirsikka	10th Evicted; Day 26
11	Michael	Dani	Linnea	Dani	11th Evicted; Day 27
12	Linnea	Sami	Michael	Michael	12th Evicted; Day 28
13	Jury	Sami	Veeti	Veeti	13th Evicted; Day 30
13	Jury	Linnea	Sami	Linnea	Runner-up; Day 30
13	Jury	Linnea	Sami	Sami	Winner; Day 30
