= Farma Česko =

- Season 1
- Presented by: Vilém Šír
- No. of days: 40
- No. of castaways: 16
- Winner: Veronika "Veve" Přikrylová
- Runners-up: Adam Raiter; Vojtěch Tichava
- Location: Central Bohemian Region, Czech Republic

Release
- Original network: TV Nova
- Original release: 23 June – 14 August 2025

Season chronology
- Next → 2026

Farma Česko is the second iteration of the Czech version of the reality television series The Farm. The show returns for the first time since 2012 where 16 contestants all over the Czech Republic competed and lived on a farm as it was a century prior. The season is hosted by former Love Island contestant Vilém Šír who leads the duels where contestants try to win the grand prize of 1,000,000 Kč with farm mentor Jan Šlosar giving weekly tasks to the contestants that whether they pass or fail decides on their weekly budget. The season premiered on 23 June 2025.

== Contestants ==
Amongst the contestants are former Survivor Česko & Slovensko contestants Veronika "Veve" Přikrylová and Adam Raiter, former Bachelor Česko contestant Maria Pavlova and Influencer Andrea Havelková.

Contestant	Age	Residence	Entered	Exited	Status	Finish
Zuzana Gehlert	59	Munich, Germany	Day 1	Day 5	Quit; Day 5	16th
Luboš Suchánek	49	Milovice	Day 1	Day 10	1st Evicted; Day 10	15th
Andrej Kalašnik	30	Brno	Day 1	Day 20	2nd Evicted; Day 20	14th
Sandra Haganová	21	Ústí nad Labem	Day 1	Day 25	3rd Evicted; Day 25	13th
Michal Souček	41	Prague	Day 1	Day 25	4th Evicted; Day 25	12th
Maria Pavlova	30	Prague	Day 1	Day 30	5th Evicted; Day 30	11th
Javier Neruda	23	Prague	Day 1	Day 32	6th Evicted; Day 32	10th
Tereza Langrová	24	Prague	Day 15	Day 33	7th Evicted; Day 33	9th
Lukáš Tůma	22	Prague	Day 1	Day 34	8th Evicted; Day 34	8th
Zdeněk Godla	50	Chomutov	Day 15	Day 35	9th Evicted; Day 35	7th
Kateřina Vítová	25	Zakynthos, Greece	Day 1	Day 36	10th Evicted; Day 36	6th
Andrea Havelková	23	Prague	Day 1	Day 36	11th Evicted; Day 36	5th
Kristýna Skokánková	31	Prague	Day 6	Day 36	12th Evicted; Day 36	4th
Adam Raiter	37	Prague	Day 6	Day 38	Runner-ups; Day 38	2nd
Vojtěch Tichava	32	Prague	Day 1	Day 38	Runner-ups; Day 38	2nd
Veronika "Veve" Přikrylová	26	Brno	Day 1	Day 38	Winner; Day 38	1st

== The game ==
Week	Head of Farm	Butlers	1st Dueler	2nd Dueler	Evicted	Finish
1	Zuzana	Luboš; Maria	Luboš	Lukáš	Zuzana	Quit; Day 5 (Note: Although Luboš lost the duel, Zuzana quit the game allowing Luboš to stay)
2	Veve	Andrea; Luboš	Luboš	Andrej	Luboš	1st Evicted; Day 10
3	Javier	Kateřina; Vojtěch	Vojtěch	Sandra	Sandra	Saved; Day 15 (Note: Due to a twist involving the two new farmers, the loser was saved from elimination.)
4	Andrea	Andrej; Michal	Andrej	Kristýna	Andrej	2nd Evicted; Day 20
5	Lukáš	Kateřina; Sandra	Sandra; Zdeněk	Michal; Kateřina	Sandra	3rd Evicted; Day 25
5	Lukáš	Kateřina; Sandra	Sandra; Zdeněk	Michal; Kateřina	Michal	4th Evicted; Day 25
6	Adam	Javier; Maria	Maria	Veve	Maria	5th Evicted; Day 30
7	Katarina	Adam; Veve	Veve	Javier	Javier	6th Evicted; Day 35
Final week					Tereza Lukáš Zdeněk	7th Evicted; Day 40
Jury Vote					Katarína	
