= Yelitza Lora =

Dominican model and actress

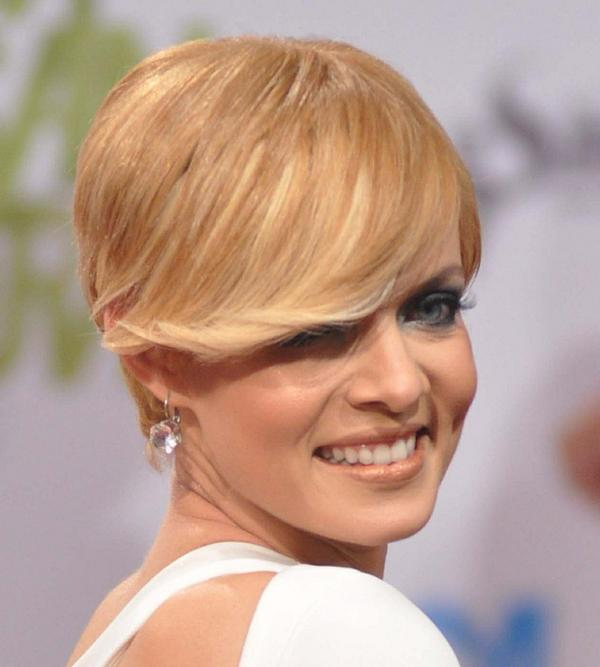
- Yelitza Lora (Dominican Radio-TV hostess and theatre and film actress) at the red carpet of the former 'Casandra' Awards (now called 'Soberano' Awards)
- Born: 12 July 1985 (age 40); Santo Domingo, Dominican Republic
- Years active: 1996 – Present
- Movement: ASODOM (Asociación De Solteras Dominicanas) AUTÓNOMAS “LEGACY”
- Children: Rachel Escano Lora Alan Corporán Lora
- Parents: radm Braulio Javier Lora Montalvo (father); Rachel De La Cruz García (mother)
- Relatives: † Rafael Corporán de los Santos (ex father-in-law)
- Website: yelitzalora.info

Flor Jelithza Lora De La Cruz, most known as Yelitza Lora (born 12 July 1985), is a Radio and TV hostess, dancer, model, and theatre and film actress from the Dominican Republic.

When she was 11 years old, Lora won the beauty pageant Nuestra Belleza Infantil. She then worked as dancer and model in several TV shows in the Dominican Republic.

Over time, she became overweight and in 2009 she got bariatric surgery, going from 200 pounds (91 kg) to just 120 pounds (54 kg); her new look helped raise her profile and popularity in the Dominican media.

After losing weight in 2009, she obtained several jobs in various television and radio programs. In 2010 she participated in the reality show LA FINCA by Tania Baez, in that program she won a lot of popularity for being the leader for the other participants and for the rumors of her romance with the urban singer Vakero.

In 2012, Lora was introduced by Alfonso Rodriguez to the film industry with her appearance in Feo De Dia Lindo De Noche and it has been influential to cinema in the Dominican Republic, she created her own film production company Princesa Films. Today, Yelitza Lora is recognized in her country with more than 20 years of experience in the entertainment industry. She is a business woman and she is dedicated to business in different areas, her first company is Otra Cosa, a phrase that has also become a slogan.

== Career ==
=== TV ===
- "La Máquina del 4" (dancer, model)
- "Cuánto Vale El Show" (dancer, model)
- "La Fiesta del Consumidor" (co-presenter)
- "Sábado de Corporán" (co-presenter)
- "La Alegría del Medio Día"
- "Show Del Mediodía"
- "Perdone la Hora"
- "Que Noche"
- "La Finca"
- "A Reir con Miguel y Raymond"
- "El Camión de tus Sueños"
- "Yelitza Lora en "Otra Cosa

=== Radio ===
- "Las Tardes con Raymundo Ortiz"
- "Parando El Trote" with Irving Alberti
- "Sobre Un Par De Tacones" with Hony Estrella
- "Otra Cosa Radio Show"

=== Theatre ===
- "Que Hacemos Con El Muerto"
- Radio Bemba
- Escuela Para Maridos
- Los Hombres De Mi Vida

=== Film ===
- Bendecidas (announced)
- Calle Sin Salida (post-production)
- Dos Policias en Apuros
- El Pelotudo
- La Extraña
- Feo De Dia Lindo De Noche
