= Fermata 2015 =

- Season 1
- Presented by: Ivan Hristov; Andrey Arnaudov
- No. of days: 99
- No. of castaways: 16
- Winner: Raino Uzunov
- Runners-up: Nora Dimitrova; Simeon Najdenov
- Location: Svode, Bulgaria
- No. of episodes: 71

Release
- Original network: bTV
- Original release: 13 September – 20 December 2015

Season chronology
- Next → Fermata 2016

Fermata 2015 (The Farm 2015) is the first season of the Bulgarian version of The Farm. The season has 16 Bulgarians compete on the farm and live like it was a century prior. Each week, the head of the farm nominates one person to be in a duel, the nominee then chooses who they'll face off against in one of three challenges. The person who loses the duel is sent home but not before writing a letter delivered to the farm stating who the head of farm for the next week is. The winner is decided in a live finale via public voting where the winner receives a grand prize of 100,000 лв. The season premiered on 13 September 2015 and concluded on 20 December 2015 where Raino Uzunov won in the live finale against Nora Dimitrova and Simeon Najdenov to win the grand prize and win Fermata 2015.

== Contestants ==
Contestant	Age	Residence	Entered	Exited	Status	Finish
Monika Mankova	24	Sofia	Day 1	Day 14	2nd Evicted; Day 14	16th
Janina Dragieva	25	Sofia	Day 1	Day 21	3rd Evicted; Day 21	15th
Aleksandar Iliev	24	Sofia	Day 1	Day 28	4th Evicted; Day 28	14th
Doni Vasileva	44	Sofia	Day 1	Day 35	5th Evicted; Day 35	13th
Georgi Varsamov	36	Sofia	Day 1	Day 42	6th Evicted; Day 42	12th
Georgi Canov	30	Pirdop	Day 1	Day 49	7th Evicted; Day 49	11th
Asen Mitev	23	Sofia	Day 1	Day 7	1st Evicted; Day 7	10th
Asen Mitev	23	Sofia	Day 35	Day 56	8th Evicted; Day 56	10th
Marija Uajt	41	Sofia	Day 1	Day 63	9th Evicted; Day 63	9th
Raja Agonceva	18	Sofia	Day 1	Day 70	10th Evicted; Day 70	8th
Veselin Vasilev	54	Sofia	Day 1	Day 77	11th Evicted; Day 77	7th
Mustafa Likov	44	Ribnovo	Day 1	Day 84	12th Evicted; Day 84	6th
Dimitar Gospodinov	33	Sofia	Day 1	Day 91	13th Evicted; Day 91	5th
Alyona Mihajlova	32	Sliven	Day 1	Day 98	14th Evicted; Day 98	4th
Simoen Najdenov	33	Sofia/Ellesmere Port, England	Day 1	Day 99	2nd Runner-up; Day 99	3rd
Nora Dimitrova	24	Sofia	Day 1	Day 99	Runner-up; Day 99	2nd
Raino Uzunov	50	Elhovo	Day 1	Day 99	Winner; Day 99	1st

== The game ==
Week	Head of Farm	Butlers	1st Dueler	2nd Dueler	Evicted	Finish
1	Veselin	Asen; Monika	Asen	Aleksandar	Asen	1st Evicted; Day 7
2	Dimitar	Monika; Raino	Monika	Alyona	Monika	2nd Evicted; Day 14
3	Doni	Georgi C. Marija	Marija	Janina	Janina	3rd Evicted; Day 21
4	Mustafa	Doni; Veselin	Veselin	Aleksandar	Aleksandar	4th Evicted; Day 28
5	Asen	Alyona; Mustafa	Alyona	Doni	Doni	5th Evicted; Day 35
6	Dimitar	Georgi V. Raja	Georgi V.	Raino	Georgi V.	6th Evicted; Day 42
7	Raja	Dimitar; Marija	Dimitar	Georgi C.	Georgi C.	7th Evicted; Day 49
8	Mustafa	Asen; Raja	Asen	Veselin	Asen	8th Evicted; Day 56
9	Dimitar	Marija; Veselin	Marija	Raja	Marija	9th Evicted; Day 63
10	Alyona	Dimitar; Nora	Nora	Raja	Raja	10th Evicted; Day 70
11	Raino	Alyona; Simeon	Simeon	Veselin	Veselin	11th Evicted; Day 77
12	Simeon	Mustafa; Nora	Mustafa	Raino	Mustafa	12th Evicted; Day 83
13	Raino	Alyona; Simeon	Simeon	Dimitar	Dimitar	13th Evicted; Day 91
14	Jury		Alyona	Nora	Alyona	14th Evicted; Day 98
14	Jury		Final Duel/Public Vote		Simeon	2nd Runner-up; Day 99
14	Jury		Final Duel/Public Vote		Nora	Runner-up; Day 99
14	Jury		Final Duel/Public Vote		Raino	Winner; Day 99
