= Farmen VIP =

Television Series in Sweden

Farmen VIP is a celebrity version of the Swedish TV-series The Farm which is broadcast on TV4. This season will be broadcast from 19 March 2018. Paolo Roberto is the host as with earlier seasons of the regular series.

== Celebrities ==
- Yvonne Ryding
- Klara Svensson
- Sigrid Bergsåkra
- Patrik Sjöberg
- Glenn Hysen
- Felicia Bergström 6th (walked)
- Samir Badran 7th
- Ola-Conny Wallgren 8th
- Camilla Henemark 9th
- Ben Mitkus 10th
