= Farmi Suomi 2025 =

- Season 7
- Presented by: Susanna Laine
- No. of days: 30
- No. of castaways: 14
- Winner: Lloyd Libiso
- Runner-up: Johanna Oras
- Location: Pieksämäki, Finland
- No. of episodes: 14

Release
- Original network: Nelonen
- Original release: 13 March – 12 June 2025

Season chronology
- ← Previous; Farmi Suomi: Revanssi Next → Farmi Suomi 2026

Farmi Suomi 2025 (The Farm Finland 2025) is the seventh season of the Finnish version of The Farm. 14 celebrities travel to a farm in Pieksämäki, Finland where they will live on the farm like it was 100 years prior and complete tasks to maintain the farm whilst trying to be the last farmer standing. The season is once again hosted by Susanna Laine with Terho Häkkinen returning as the farm mentor where contestants compete to win a grand prize of €30,000. The season will premiere on Nelonen on 13 March 2025.

== Finishing order ==
(Ages are stated at the time of competition)

Contestant	Age	Background	Entered	Exited	Status	Finish
Henna Kalinainen	35	Former Big Brother Contestant	Day 1	Day 3	1st Evicted; Day 3	14th
Ari Koivunen	40	Singer	Day 1	Day 6	2nd Evicted; Day 6	13th
Kasper Strömman	50	Cartoonist	Day 1	Day 9	3rd Evicted; Day 9	12th
Joona Hellman	28	YouTuber	Day 1	Day 12	4th Evicted; Day 12	11th
Lasse "Redrama" Mellberg	46	Rapper	Day 1	Day 18	6th Evicted; Day 18	10th
Lasse "Redrama" Mellberg	46	Rapper	Day 19	Day 20	7th Evicted; Day 20	10th
Tuomas Rajala	45	Journalist	Day 1	Day 21	8th Evicted; Day 21	9th
Eija Kantola	58	Singer	Day 1	Day 24	9th Evicted; Day 24	8th
Perttu Sirviö	41	Big Brother Winner	Day 1	Day 15	5th Evicted; Day 15	7th
Perttu Sirviö	41	Big Brother Winner	Day 19	Day 26	10th Evicted; Day 26	7th
Viivi Kuusela	36	Comedian	Day 1	Day 27	11th Evicted; Day 27	6th
Sini "Papananaama" Laitinen	32	YouTuber	Day 1	Day 29	12th Evicted; Day 29	5th
Sami Garam	56	TV Chef	Day 1	Day 29	13th Evicted; Day 29	4th
Sonja Aiello	24	Fitness Influencer	Day 1	Day 30	14th Evicted; Day 30	3rd
Johanna Oras	54	Artist	Day 1	Day 30	Runner-up; Day 30	2nd
Lloyd Libiso	31	Journalist	Day 1	Day 30	Winner; Day 30	1st

== The game ==
Week	Farmer of the Week	1st Dueler	2nd Dueler	Evicted	Finish
1	Lloyd	Ari	Henna	Henna	1st Evicted; Day 3
2	Joona	Kasper	Ari	Ari	2nd Evicted; Day 6
3	Eija	Kasper	Joona	Kasper	3rd Evicted; Day 9
4	Redrama	Joona	Tuomas	Joona	4th Evicted; Day 12
5	Papananaama	Lloyd	Perttu	Perttu	5th Evicted; Day 15
6	Johanna	Redrama	Sami	Redrama	6th Evicted; Day 18
7	None (Note: For week seven, the two most recent contestants eliminated formed teams for the weekly challenge. The losing team would have their head captain be automatically eliminated with the winning team captain returning to the competition.)	Perttu	Redrama	Redrama	7th Evicted; Day 20
7	None	Johanna	Tuomas	Tuomas	8th Evicted; Day 21
8	Viivi	Eija	Perttu	Eija	9th Evicted; Day 24
9	Sami	Sonja	Perttu	Perttu	10th Evicted; Day 26
10 (Note: This week was stretched between two episodes (10 and 11). The duel occurred in the next episode.)	Johanna	Lloyd	Viivi		11th Evicted; Day 27
11	Johanna	Lloyd	Viivi	Viivi	11th Evicted; Day 27
12	Johanna	All		Sini	12th Evicted; Day 29
13	Johanna	All		Sami	13th Evicted; Day 29
14	Jury	Lloyd	Sonja	Sonja	14th Evicted; Day 30
14	Jury	Johanna	Lloyd	Johanna	Runner-up; Day 30
14	Jury	Johanna	Lloyd	Lloyd	Winner; Day 30
