= Farmen VIP season 2 =

Farmen VIP is the second season of the celebrity version of the TV4 reality series The Farm. The presenter is Paolo Roberto. It premiered on 11 March 2019.

== Contestants ==
- Amir Akrouti, youtuber
- Frank Andersson, wrestler
- Sigrid Bernson, singer and dancer
- Felicia Book, influencer (Left due to injury, Episode 1)
- Dogge Doggelito, singer
- Per Fosshaug, bandyplayer
- Regina Lund, actress and singer
- Vlad Reiser, youtuber and singer
- Anna Sahlene, singer
- Saga Scott, reality star
