= Vlad Reiser =

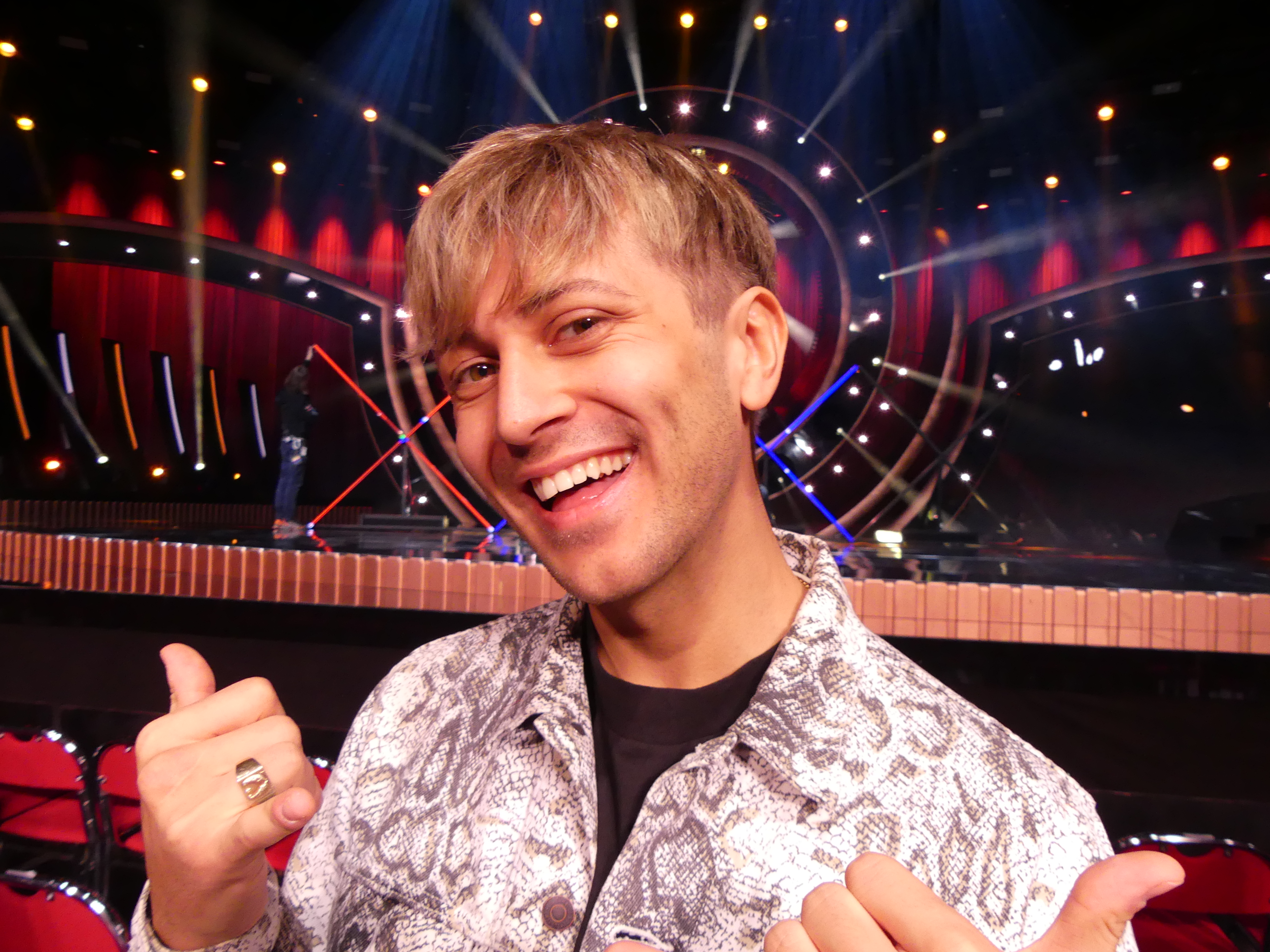

Background information
- Also known as: Reizy
- Born: Vladislav Melesjtjenkov; 7 May 1993 (age 33); Zhodzina, Belarus
- Occupation: Youtuber

Vladislav Melesjtjenkov, known as Vlad Reiser (born 7 May 1993), is a Belarusian-Swedish singer and YouTuber with more than 480,000 subscribers. Reiser came to Sweden from Belarus with his family in 2002 when he was nine years old.

Reiser rose to prominence after starting a successful YouTube channel, NormelTV, with his friend Daniel Norlin. The channel is, as of 2023, no longer active. Instead both Reiser and Norlin has focused on growing their own separate channels.

Vlad Reiser hosted the Nickelodeon show Hey Nickelodeon Med Vlad & Athena. Reiser has also made appearances on various Swedish TV-show, as Farmen VIP (2019) & MTV Ridiculousness (2018).

Vlad participated in Melodifestivalen 2019 with the song "Nakna i regnet", which he performed in the second semi-final. He made it to the Second Chance round.

== Controversy ==
In January 2021, Reiser uploaded a YouTube video where he rated underage girls on TikTok based on sexual criteria. The video was criticized by Swedish celebrities such as Filip Dikmen, Joakim Lundell and Cissi Wallin, before it was taken down. Reiser later apologized for the video.

== Discography ==
=== Singles ===
| Title | Year | Peak chart positions | Album |
| Title | Year | SWE | Album |
|---|---|---|---|
| "Prankstar" | 2018 | 76 | Non-album singles |
| "Nakna i regnet" | 2019 | 34 | Non-album singles |
