= Ben Mitkus =

Swedish television personality and singer

- Born: 23 December 1994 (age 31); Mažeikiai, Lithuania
- Genres: Pop
- Occupations: Singer, YouTuber
- Years active: 2014–present
- Labels: Universal Music
- Partner: Caroline Johansson

Ben Mitkus (born 23 December 1994) is a Swedish television personality and singer. He also maintains a YouTube channel with over 530,000 subscribers.

He came to Sweden from Lithuania with his family at the age of four and resides in Örebro. He auditioned for Idol 2014, and also participated in the series Ung och bortskämd, broadcast on TV3, where he placed second in the final. Mitkus has a YouTube account, which in 2016 had 36 million views, where he posts videos of himself singing. Mitkus is signed to Universal Music.

In 2018, he participated in Farmen VIP along with several Swedish celebrities. He was the first celebrity to be eliminated from the Farm. In 2016, Mitkus released the single "Kills Me", which peaked at number 56 on the Sverigetopplistan singles chart.

== Singles ==
Title	Year	Peak chart positions	Album
Title	Year	SWE	Album
"Kills Me"	2016	56	Non-album singles
"Ridin"	2016	34	Non-album singles
"Please Be Mine for Christmas"	2016	—	Non-album singles
"Heartbreak Love Song"	2016	—	Non-album singles
"U Know"	2017	—	Non-album singles
"Do U Love Me"	2017	80	Non-album singles
"Heartbreak Love Song" (acoustic)	2017	—	The Acoustic Sessions EP
"Christmas Love"	2017	—	The Acoustic Sessions EP
"Ridin" (acoustic)	2017	—	The Acoustic Sessions EP
"So This Is Christmas (War Is Over)"	2017	—	The Acoustic Sessions EP
"Kills Me" (acoustic)	2017	—	The Acoustic Sessions EP
"When You Wish Upon a Star"	2017	—	The Acoustic Sessions EP
"Faster Than Lightning" (With Chris Willis)	2018	—	Non-album singles
"Saturday"	2018	— (Note: "Saturday" did not enter the Swedish Singellista Chart, but peaked at number nine on the Swedish Heatseeker Chart.)	Non-album singles
"Trofé"	2018	— (Note: "Trofé" did not enter the Swedish Singellista Chart, but peaked at number three on the Swedish Heatseeker Chart.)	Non-album singles
"Samma gamla du"	2019	—	Non-album singles
"Blundar du så blundar jag"	2019	—	Non-album singles
"On/Off"	2020	—	Non-album singles
"Efternamn"	2020	—	Non-album singles
"Över Hela Stan"	2020	—	Non-album singles
"Stannat"	2020	—	Non-album singles
"Dirt on My Name"	2020	—	Non-album singles
"Moves"	2020	—	Non-album singles
"Tavla från Pari" (with Niklas Jeng)	2021	—	Non-album singles
"Dem är inte bra"	2021	—	Non-album singles
"Relations"	2022	—	Non-album singles
"I'm on the Go"	2022	—	Non-album singles
"No time"	2022	—	Non-album singles
"Trippin' on a Lately"	2022	—	Non-album singles
"She Classy"	2022	—	Non-album singles
"I'll Be Lovin, I'll Be Trappin'"	2022	—	Non-album singles
"Emotion"	2022	—	Non-album singles
"Promises"	2022	—	Non-album singles
"Regna över oss"	2023	—	Non-album singles
"Conversations"	2024	—	Non-album singles
"Caroline"	2024	55	Non-album singles
