= Suuri kupla =

Finnish game show

- Genre: Quiz show
- Presented by: Ilkka Heiskanen; Sami Garam; Ellen Jokikunnas; Tuulianna Tola
- Country of origin: Finland
- Original language: Finnish

Original release
- Network: Yle
- Release: 2001 – 2006

Suuri kupla (Finnish for "big bubble") is a Finnish playful quiz show for youths about comics and animated cartoons. On the show, two teams competed against one another. At first, Ilkka Heiskanen acted as host and later Sami Garam and Ellen Jokikunnas, and in its last years, Tuulianna Tola hosted the program. Suuri kupla aired on Yle's channels from 2001 to 2006.
