= Farmi Suomi 2026 =

- Season 8
- Presented by: Susanna Laine
- No. of days: 30
- No. of castaways: 15
- Winner: Jannica Nordberg
- Runner-up: Tidjân Ba
- Location: Pieksämäki, Finland

Release
- Original network: Nelonen
- Original release: 12 March – 11 June 2026

Season chronology
- ← Previous; Farmi Suomi 2025

Farmi Suomi 2026 (The Farm Finland 2026) is the eighth season of the Finnish version of The Farm. The season returns to Pieksämäki, Finland where 14 celebrities live on a farm as it was a century prior. The season is hosted by Susanna Laine, with farm mentor Terho Häkkinen returning to help guide the contestants as they compete to win a grand prize of €30,000. The season premieres on 12 March 2026 on Nelonen.

== Finishing order ==
(Ages are stated at the time of competition)

Contestant	Age	Background	Entered	Exited	Status	Finish
Ilkka "Frederik" Sysimetsä	80	Singer	Day 1	Day 3	1st Evicted; Day 3	15th
Joonas Könttä	35	Politician	Day 1	Day 6	2nd Evicted; Day 6	14th
Sini-Maria "Sini Sabotage" Makkonen	39	Rapper	Day 1	Day 9	3rd Evicted; Day 9	13th
Riiko Sakkinen	49	Visual Artist	Day 1	Day 9	Quit; Day 9	12th
Tomi "Häärijä" Häppölä	32	Singer	Day 1	Day 11	4th Evicted; Day 11	11th
Anne-Mari Tarkkio	31	Influencer	Day 1	Day 15	5th Evicted; Day 15	10th
Kätlin Malm	38	Former Big Brother contestant	Day 1	Day 17	6th Evicted; Day 17	9th
Janne Naakka	31	YouTuber	Day 1	Day 19	7th Evicted; Day 19	8th
Henriikka Rönkkönen	41	Author	Day 1	Day 21	8th Evicted; Day 21	7th
José "Jucci" Hellström	51	Show Dancer	Day 1	Day 23	9th Evicted; Day 23	6th
Noriko Salo	54	Former gravure idol	Day 1	Day 24	10th Evicted; Day 24	5th
Kirsi Salo	58	TV Presenter	Day 1	Day 27	11th Evicted; Day 27	4th
Ville Lång	40	Former Badminton player	Day 19	Day 30	12th Evicted; Day 30	3rd
Tidjân Ba	46	Singer	Day 1	Day 30	Runner-up; Day 30	2nd
Jannica Nordberg	38	TikToker	Day 1	Day 30	Winner; Day 30	1st

== The game ==
Week	Farmer of the Week	1st Dueler	2nd Dueler	Evicted	Finish
1	Jannica	Häärijä	Frederik	Frederik	1st Evicted; Day 3
2	Jannica	Riiko	Joonas	Joonas	2nd Evicted; Day 6
3	Tidjân	Anne-Mari	Sini	Sini	3rd Evicted; Day 9
3	Tidjân	Anne-Mari	Sini	Riiko	Quit; Day 9
4	Noriko	Jucci	Häärijä	Häärijä	4th Evicted; Day 11
5	Jannica	Janne	Kirsi	Janne	Saved; Day 13 (Note: Due to Riiko's exit earlier in the season, Janne was saved from elimination.)
6	Kirsi	Anne-Mari	Kätlin	Anne-Mari	5th Evicted; Day 15
7	Kirsi; Tidjân (Note: The contestants competed in a challenge between two teams; the losing team were eligible for the duel.)	Jannica	Kätlin	Kätlin	6th Evicted; Day 17
8	Jucci	Janne	Henriikka	Janne	7th Evicted; Day 19
9	Noriko	Ville	Henriikka	Henriikka	8th Evicted; Day 21
10	Noriko	None			None
11	Jannica	None			None (Note: For weeks ten and eleven, no duels were held.)
12	Jannica	Jucci	Tidjân	Jucci	9th Evicted; Day 23
12	Jannica	Kirsi	Noriko	Noriko	10th Evicted; Day 24
13	None	All		Kirsi	11th Evicted; Day 27
14	Jury	Tidjân	Ville	Ville	14th Evicted; Day 30
14	Jury	Jannica	Tidjân	Tidjân	Runner-up; Day 30
14	Jury	Jannica	Tidjân	Jannica	Winner; Day 30
