= Ana María Polo =

Cuban-American lawyer and television arbitrator

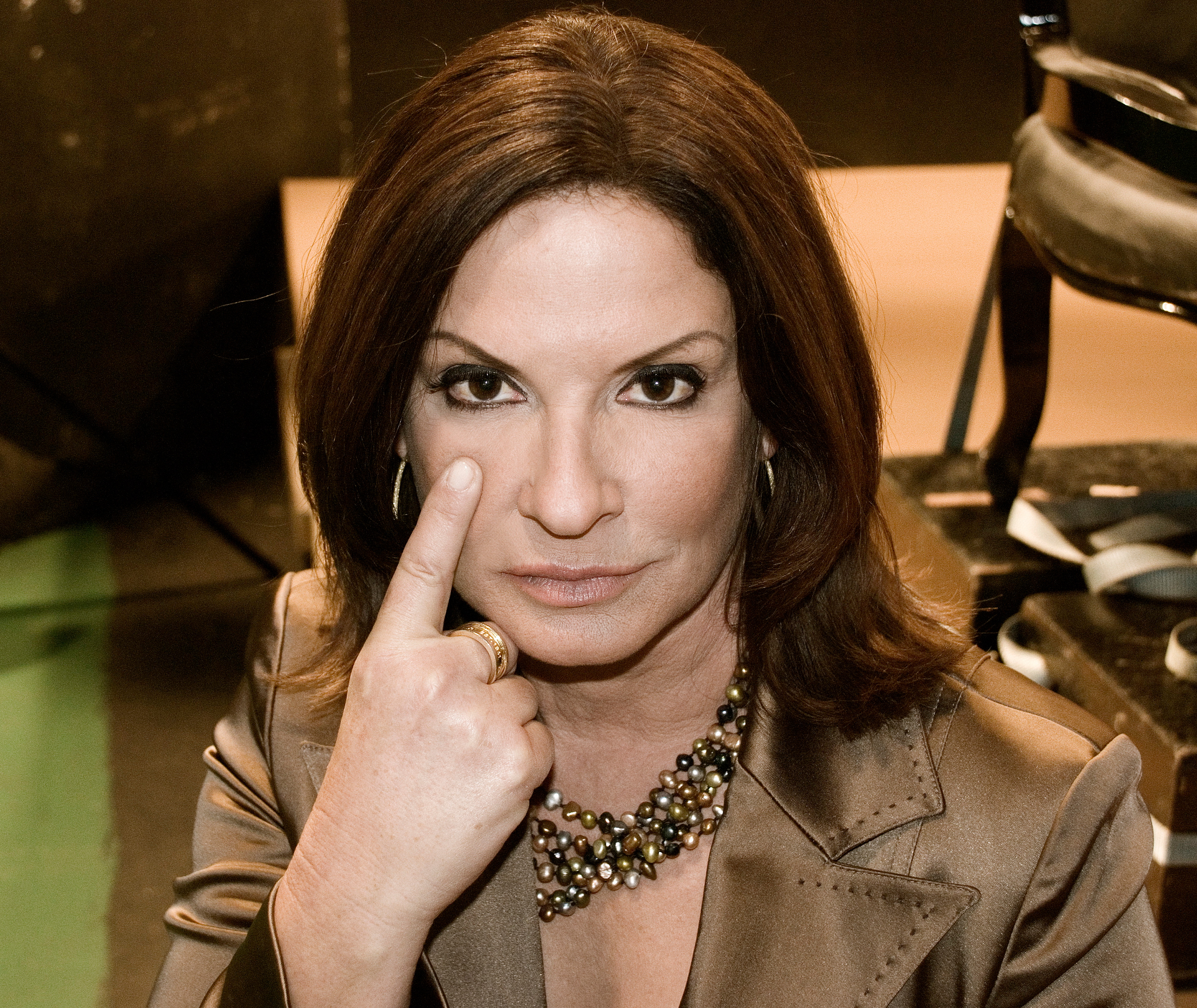
- Polo in 2008
- Born: Ana María Polo González; 11 April 1959 (age 67); Havana, Cuba
- Education: University of Miami School of Law (JD)
- Occupations: Arbitrator; television personality; lawyer; singer
- Years active: 1978–present
- Children: 1

Ana María Polo González (11 April 1959) is a Cuban-American lawyer and television personality, best known as an arbitrator on the Spanish-language court show Caso Cerrado and the Anglophone spin-off counterpart Ana Polo Rules.

== Early life ==
Born in Havana, La Habana Province, Cuba, Polo's family moved to Miami when she was 2 years old. They later moved to Puerto Rico, where she participated in different musicals including Godspell, Jubilee and Show Boat in addition to singing with the choir of Jubilee, which was invited by Pope Paul VI to sing at St. Peter's Basilica in Rome as part of the celebration of the 1975 Holy Year.

== Career ==
Polo graduated from the University of Miami School of Law in 1987 and is a member of the Florida Bar. She was a member of the law firm of Emmanuel Perez & Associates, P.A. in Coral Gables, Florida.

From 2 April 2001 to 10 December 2019, she arbitrated the popular Spanish-language TV show Caso Cerrado, which airs on Telemundo and can also be viewed on the YouTube channel. In 2010, Caso Cerrado, which Polo created, was nominated for a Daytime Emmy Award for Outstanding Legal/Courtroom Program. This marked the first time a program from a Spanish-language network had been nominated for an Emmy.

In 2017, Polo created the English-language spin-off of Caso Cerrado called Ana Polo Rules with the same synopsis; however, it was cancelled after only 15 episodes due to declining ratings. All 15 episodes are available to stream on Tubi.

== Personal life ==
A breast cancer survivor, Polo frequently speaks about it and raises funds for the cause. She has also advocated for LGBT rights throughout her career.
