= La Finca =

Dominican adaptation of reality television series The Farm

La Finca is the Dominican adaptation of reality television series The Farm. The show is a co-production between Tania Báez and company MediaWorld Dominicana.

The series debuted on May 23, 2010, and ran until August 29, 2010. The series ran for 13 episodes airing on Sunday at 8 pm with repeats Tuesdays at 9 pm.

10 Dominican celebrities joined the cast as contestants.

== Contestants ==
Celebrity	Home	Famous for.../Occupation	Age
Aquiles Correa		TV Host	34
Frank Ceara		Singer	29
Héctor Pérez Reyes		TV Host	30
Javier Benzan		Singer	29
Jochy Pascual		Dancer & TV Host	29
Leidi Luna		TV Host & Actress	30
Nuryn Sanlley		Actress & TV Producer	57
Pamela Simó		Child Star	23
Sharmin Díaz		TV Host	28
Manuel Varet, "Vakero"		Rapper	31
Yelitza Lora		Radio & TV Host	24

== Nominations ==
	Round 1	Round 2	Round 3	Round 4	Round 5	Round 6	Round 7	Round 8	Round 9	Final	
Farm Leader (Immunity)	Correa	Nuryn	-	-	-	Yelitza	Correa	??	??	None	
Correa	Leidi	Héctor	Javier	Not; Nominated	Not; Nominated	Leidi	Yelitza	??	??	Winner	
Yelitza	Not; Nominated	Not; Nominated	Pamela	Not; Nominated	Not; Nominated	Leidi	Javier	??	??	Runner-Up	
Héctor	Not in The Farm	Not; Nominated	Not; Nominated	Correa	Correa	Leidi	Yelitza	??	??	Evicted	
Nuryn	Not; Nominated	Not; Nominated	Not; Nominated	Correa	Correa	Leidi	Javier	??	Evicted		
Javier	Leidi	Jochy	Not; Nominated	Yelitza	Correa	Correa	Yelitza	Evicted			
Leidi	Not; Nominated	Not; Nominated	Javier	Not; Nominated	Not; Nominated	Javier	Evicted				
Vakero	Frank	Jochy	Not; Nominated	Correa	Correa	Walked					
Sharmin	Leidi	Jochy	Javier	Not; Nominated	Evicted						
Pamela	Nuryn	Jochy	Not; Nominated	Re-Evicted							
Jochy	Not; Nominated	Not; Nominated	Evicted								
Frank	Not; Nominated	Walked									
Walked	None	Frank	None		Vakero	None					
Immunity Team	Red	Red	Blue	Red	Red	None					
1st Nominated (By Group)	Leidi (3/5 votes)	Jochy (4/5 votes)	Javier (3/4 votes)	Correa (3/4 votes)	Correa (4/4 votes)	Leidi (4/6 votes)	Yelitza (3/5 votes)	?? (?/6 votes)	??	None	
2nd Nominated (by 1st Nominated)	Nuryn	Leidi	Pamela	Sharmin	Leidi	Héctor	Javier	??	??	None	
Evicted	Eviction; Cancelled	Jochy; Lost duel	Pamela; Lost duel	Sharmin; Lost duel	Eviction; Cancelled	Leidi; Lost duel	Javier; Lost duel	Nuryn; Lost duel	Héctor; Lost duel	Yelitza; Lost Final Duel	
Evicted	Eviction; Cancelled	Jochy; Lost duel	Pamela; Lost duel	Sharmin; Lost duel	Eviction; Cancelled	Leidi; Lost duel	Javier; Lost duel	Nuryn; Lost duel	Héctor; Lost duel	Yelitza; Lost Final Duel	Correa; Won Final Duel
