= De Farm =

- Season 1
- Presented by: Evi Hanssen; Gijs Staverman
- No. of days: 65
- No. of castaways: 16
- Winner: Matthijs Vegter
- Runner-up: Peyman Azizi
- Location: Swartberg, South Africa
- No. of episodes: 13

Release
- Original network: VTM; Yorin
- Original release: March 3 – May 26, 2005

De Farm (The Farm) is the first and only season of the Belgian/Dutch version of the reality television franchise The Farm. The season brings 16 contestants, 8 of whom from Belgium, 8 of whom from the Netherlands to a farm near Swartberg in South Africa where they live amongst each other like it was a century prior to compete in challenges and in the end try and win the grand prize of €50,000. The series was hosted by Flemish presenter Evi Hanssen and Dutch presenter Gijs Staverman where the season premiered on 3 March 2005 on VTM and Yorin. The series concluded on 26 May 2005 where Matthijs Vegter won against fellow Dutch contestant Peyman Azizi to win the grand prize and be crowned the winner of De Farm.

== Contestants ==
All contestants entered on Day 1.

List of De Farm contestants
Contestant	Age on entry	Residence	Exited	Status	Finish
Antony van den Berg	36	Vlissingen, Netherlands	Day 5	1st Evicted; Day 5	16th
Edmonda Vertonghen	45	Merchtem, Belgium	Day 10	2nd Evicted; Day 10	15th
Nelson Morais	21	Antwerp, Belgium	Day 15	3rd Evicted; Day 15	14th
Nicolette Kluijver	21	Almere, Netherlands	Day 20	4th Evicted; Day 20	13th
Caroline Leenaert	28	Lauwe, Belgium	Day 25	5th Evicted; Day 25	12th
Oscar Aantjes	48	Hellevoetsluis, Netherlands	Day 30	6th Evicted; Day 30	11th
Mathieu Simons	66	Genk, Belgium	Day 35	7th Evicted; Day 35	10th
Jeanette Marcis	51	Assen, Netherlands	Day 40	8th Evicted; Day 40	9th
Bibi Leushuis	30	Badhoevedorp, Netherlands	Day 45	9th Evicted; Day 45	8th
Bernd Hermans	35	Neerpelt, Belgium	Day 50	Medically evacuated Day 50	7th
Ellen Schutten	38	Amsterdam, Netherlands	Day 55	10th Evicted; Day 55	6th
Manu Raemdonck	34	Antwerp, Belgium	Day 60	11th Evicted; Day 60	5th
Sofie Kerkhofs	23	Leopoldsburg, Belgium	Day 62	12th Evicted; Day 62	4th
Mieke Van Parys	34	Merelbeke, Belgium	Day 63	13th Evicted; Day 63	3rd
Peyman Azizi	26	Tilburg, Netherlands	Day 65	Runner-up; Day 65	2nd
Matthijs Vegter	21	Leiderdorp, Netherlands	Day 65	Winner; Day 65	1st

== The game ==
Week	Head of Farm	1st Dueler	2nd Dueler	Evicted	Finish
1	Manu	Antony	Oscar	Antony	1st Evicted; Day 5
2	Oscar	Ellen	Edmonda	Edmonda	2nd Evicted; Day 10
3	Oscar	Matthijs	Nelson	Nelson	3rd Evicted; Day 15
4	Matthijs	Oscar	Nicolette	Nicolette	4th Evicted; Day 20
5	Jeanette	Caroline	Matthijs	Caroline	5th Evicted; Day 25
6	Ellen	Oscar	Matthijs	Oscar	6th Evicted; Day 30
7	Jeanette	Mathieu	Sofie	Mathieu	7th Evicted; Day 35
8	Bernd	Jeanette	Manu	Jeanette	8th Evicted; Day 40
9	Sofie	Peyman	Bibi	Bibi	9th Evicted; Day 45
10	Ellen	Bernd	Matthijs	Bernd	Medically evacuated Day 50
11	Manu	Mieke	Ellen	Ellen	10th Evicted; Day 55
12	Peyman	Manu	Mieke	Manu	11th Evicted; Day 60
13	Jury {Peyman} (Note: The Jury were tasked with choosing a finalist to immediately advance to the final duel and in addition, decide who amongst the rest is eliminated. They chose to eliminate Sofie and make Peyman an immediate finalist.)	All		Sofie	12th Evicted; Day 62
13	Jury {Peyman}	Matthijs	Mieke	Mieke	13th Evicted; Day 63
13	Jury {Peyman}	Peyman	Matthijs	Peyman	Runner-up; Day 65
13	Jury {Peyman}	Peyman	Matthijs	Matthijs	Winner; Day 65
