= La Granja VIP (Chilean TV series) =

La Granja VIP was a Chilean reality television and is the second season of The Farm. It was aired from May 10, 2005, to August 12, 2005, by Canal 13 and was produced by Promofilm. It was hosted by Sergio Lagos.

The winner was Javier Estrada.

== Finishing order ==
Contestant	Famous for...	Original team	Episode 8-11 Team	Merged team	Finish
Ana María "Zapallito" Muñoz; 29	Dancer	Green			2nd Evicted; Day ??
Sandra O'Ryan; 35	Actress	Green			Left Voluntary; Day ??
Victoria Leonenko; 24	English Teacher	Green			3rd Evicted; Day ??
Pamela Díaz; 24	Model	Green			1st Evicted; Day ?? 4th Evicted; Day ??
Cristián "Black" Jara; 35	Radio Host	Orange			Expelled; Day ??
Hernán Hevia; 35	Actor	Orange			6th Evicted; Day ??
Catherine Barriga; 25	Dancer	Green	Blue		7th Evicted; Day ??
Santiago Sánchez; 24	Physical Education Teacher	Orange	Blue		8th Evicted; Day ??
Pablo Schilling; 21	Athlete	Green	Blue		9th Evicted; Day ??
Carolina "Elektra" Lagos; 27	DJ	Green	Red	Black	2nd Evicted; Day ?? 10th Evicted; Day ??
Marisela Santibáñez; 28	Radio Host and Actress		Red	Black	11th Evicted; Day ??
Patricio Laguna; 28	Model	Green	Red	Black	12th Evicted; Day ??
Verónica Roberts; 22	Model and Miss Chile	Orange	Blue	Black	13th Evicted; Day ??
María Victoria Lissidini; 20, Santiago	La Granja 1 Contestant		Blue	Black	3rd Place; Day ??
Gabriel "Coca" Mendoza; 36	Ex-Footballer	Green	Red	Black	Runner-Up; Day ??
Javier Estrada; 28, Barcelona, Spain	Gran Hermano 3 Spain Housemate	Orange	Red	Black	5th Evicted; Day ?? Winner; Day ??

== Nominations ==
Week	1	2	3	4	5	6	7	8	9	10	11	12	13	14
Farm Leader	Patricio	Coca	Cathy	Verónica	Santiago	Pablo	Santiago	Javier	Patricio	Marisela	Vicky	Verónica	Javier	-
Immunity	Green Team	Green Team	Equipo; Orange Team	Equipo; Orange Team	Green Team	Green Team	Red Team	Red Team	Red Team	Javier	Patricio	Coca	Vicky	-
Javier	Zapallito	Verónica	Elektra	Patricio	Verónica		Pablo	Pablo	Pablo	Patricio	Coca	Vicky	Verónica	Winner
Coca	Verónica	Santiago	Pablo	Catherine	Javier	Santiago	Catherine	Santiago	Pablo	Vicky	Verónica	Verónica	Verónica	Runner-Up
Vicky							Catherine	Santiago	Verónica	Patricio	Coca	Javier	Javier	3rd Place
Verónica	Santiago	Santiago	Elektra	Pablo	Javier	Santiago	Pablo	Vicky	Pablo	Patricio	Coca	Javier	Javier	
Patricio	Santiago	Santiago	Pablo	Catherine	Javier	Santiago	Catherine	Santiago	Pablo	Vicky	Verónica	Verónica		
Marisela							Catherine	Santiago	Pablo	Patricio	Verónica			
Elektra	Verónica	Santiago	Pablo	Catherine	Javier	Santiago	Catherine	Santiago	Pablo	Marisela				
Pablo	Santiago	Santiago	Elektra	Catherine	Javier	Santiago	Catherine	Vicky	Verónica					
Santiago	Verónica	Verónica	Coca	Pablo	Verónica	Verónica	Catherine	Vicky						
Catherine	Santiago	Santiago	Pablo	Pablo	Verónica	Santiago	Pablo							
Hernán	Verónica	Verónica	Pablo	Pablo	Verónica	Verónica								
Black	Verónica	Javier	Pablo	Catherine										
Pamela	Verónica			Catherine										
Victoria	Santiago	Santiago	Elektra											
Sandra	Santiago	Hernán												
Zapallito	Santiago	Black												
Public Nominations	Pamela; 93.2%	Zapallito; 13.5%	Victoria; 16.3%	Pamela %	Hernán; 28.9%	Hernán; 30.1%	Vicky; 11.0%	Verónica; 10.3%	Vicky; 9.32%	Elektra %	Marisela %	Patricio %	Coca %	-
Contestant Nominations	Santiago; 7/14 votes	Santiago; 7/13 votes	Pablo; 6/11 votes	Catherine; 6/11 votes	Javier; 5/9 votes	Santiago; 6/8 votes	Catherine; 7/10 votes	Santiago; 5/9 votes	Pablo; 6/8 votes	Patricio; 4/7 votes	Coca; 3/6 votes^{7}	Javier; 2/5 votes^{8}	Verónica; 2/4 votes^{9}	-
Evicted	Pamela	Zapallito	Victoria	Pamela	Javier	Hernán	Catherine	Santiago	Pablo	Elektra	Marisela	Patricio	Verónica	-
