= Kratochvilka =

- Municipality
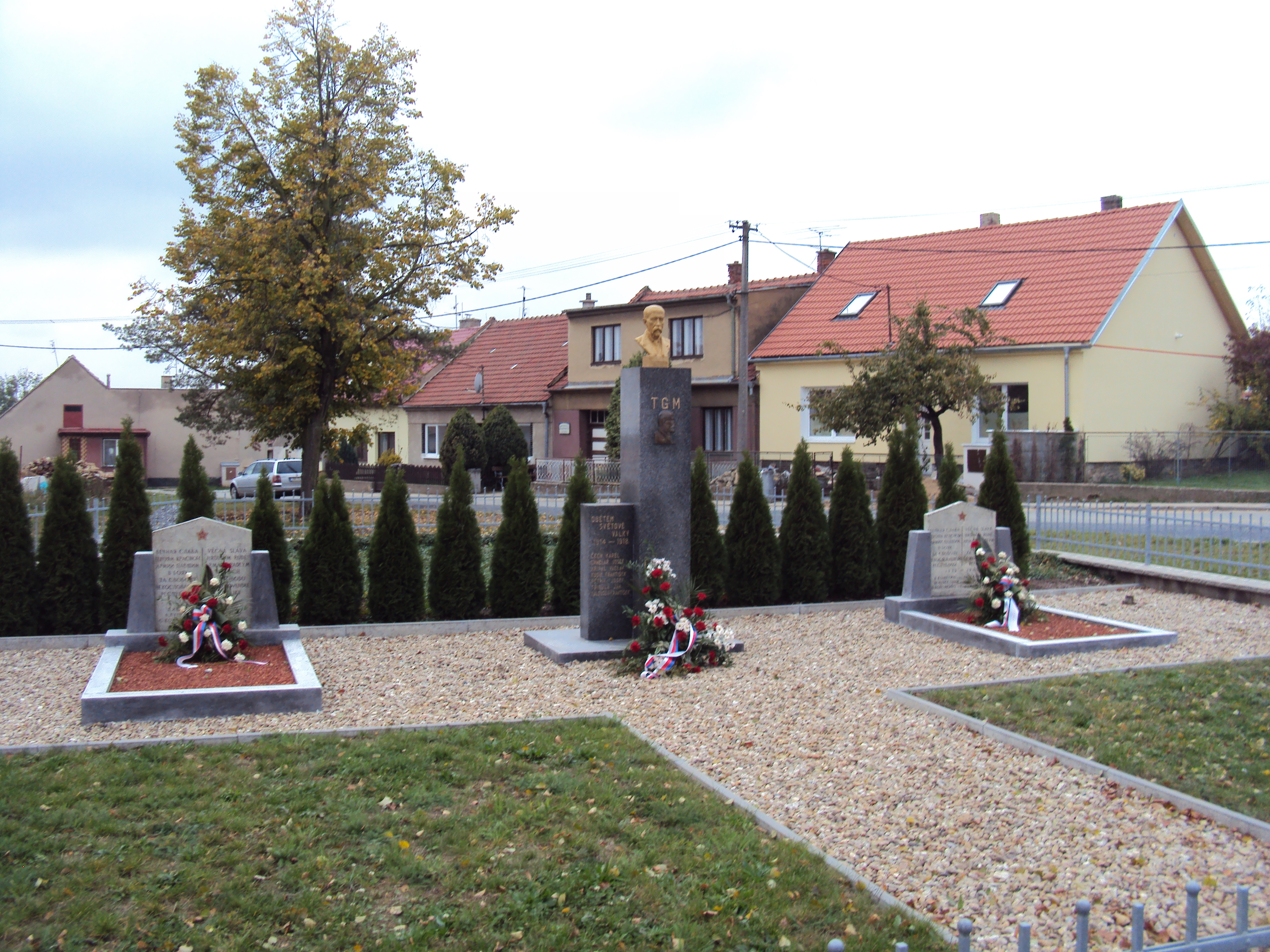
- Memorial to the victims of the world wars

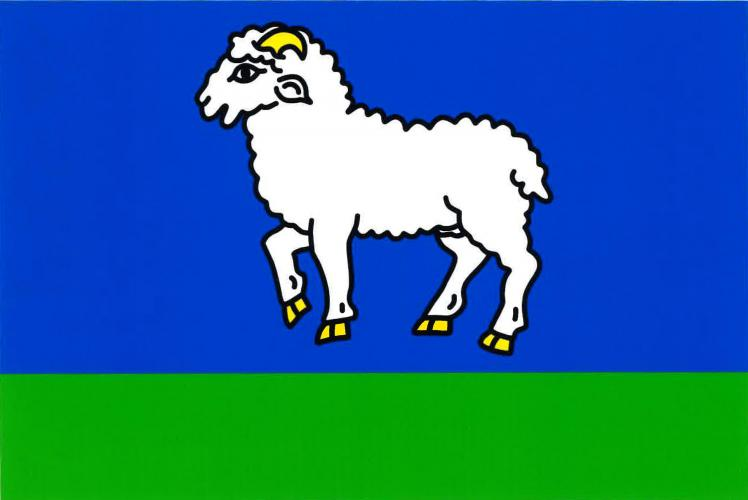
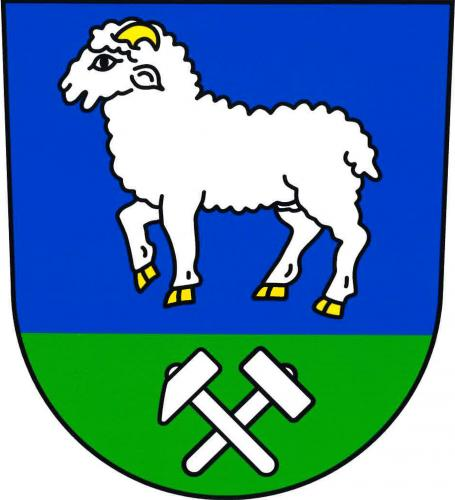
- Flag Coat of arms

- Location in the Czech Republic
- Coordinates: 49°9′24″N 16°22′35″E
- Country: Czech Republic
- Region: South Moravian
- District: Brno-Country
- Founded: 1783

Area
  - Total: 1.50 km^{2} (0.58 sq mi)
- Elevation: 385 m (1,263 ft)

Population (2026-01-01)
  - Total: 505
  - Density: 337/km^{2} (872/sq mi)
- Time zone: UTC+1 (CET)
  - Summer (DST): UTC+2 (CEST)
- Postal codes: 664 91
- Website: www.kratochvilka.cz

Kratochvilka is a municipality and village in Brno-Country District in the South Moravian Region of the Czech Republic. It has about 500 inhabitants.

Kratochvilka lies approximately 19 kilometres (12 mi) west of Brno and 175 km (109 mi) south-east of Prague.

== Demographics ==
Historical population
Year	Pop.	±%
1869	190	—
1880	209	+10.0%
1890	244	+16.7%
1900	360	+47.5%
1910	429	+19.2%
1921	482	+12.4%
1930	561	+16.4%
1950	586	+4.5%
1961	536	−8.5%
1970	518	−3.4%
1980	506	−2.3%
1991	436	−13.8%
2001	429	−1.6%
2011	445	+3.7%
2021	466	+4.7%
Source: Censuses
