= Farmen 2016 (Sweden) =

- Season 9
- Presented by: Paolo Roberto
- No. of days: 69
- No. of contestants: 16
- Winner: Fredrik Rosenkvist
- Runner-up: Lina Ilar
- Location: Brandsjön, Sweden

Release
- Original network: TV4
- Original release: 10 January – 20 March 2016

Season chronology
- ← Previous; Farmen 2015 Next → Farmen 2017

Farmen 2016 (The Farm 2016) is the ninth season of the Swedish version of The Farm reality television show. The season like last year takes place on a farm in Brandsjön in the municipality of Vaggeryd, Sweden where contestants live on and work on a farm like they did 100 year prior. The season premiered on TV4 on 10 January 2016 and concluded on 20 March 2016 where Fredrik Rosenkvist won against Lina Ilar in the final duel to win 500,000 kr. and the title of Farmen 2016.

== Format ==
Sixteen contestants are chosen from the outside world. Each week one contestant is selected the Farmer of the Week. In the first week, the contestants choose the Farmer. Since week 2, the Farmer is chosen by the contestant evicted in the previous week.

=== Nomination process ===
The Farmer of the Week nominates two people (a man and a woman) as the Butlers. The others must decide which Butler is the first to go to the Battle. That person then chooses the second person (from the same sex) for the Battle and also the type of battle (a quiz, extrusion, endurance, sleight). The Battle winner must win two duels. The Battle loser is evicted from the game.

== Finishing order ==
(ages stated are at time of contest)

Contestant	Age	Residence	Entered	Exited	Status	Finish
Ali Kabiri	26	Täby	Day 1	Day 7	1st Evicted; Day 7	16th
Paul Rosensköld	55	Malmö	Day 1	Day 14	2nd Evicted; Day 14	15th
Gunvor Friberg	25	Helsingborg	Day 1	Day 21	3rd Evicted; Day 21	14th
Ewonne Eneroth	63	Söderhamn	Day 1	Day 28	4th Evicted; Day 28	13th
Sara-Marie Costa	27	Malmö	Day 1	Day 35	5th Evicted; Day 35	12th
Hampus Jönsson	27	Dalhem	Day 1	Day 42	6th Evicted; Day 42	11th
Göran Terninger	66	Åkersberga	Day 1	Day 43	7th Evicted; Day 43	10th
Robin Stenberg	26	Nacka	Day 1	Day 49	8th Evicted; Day 49	9th
Morgan Lindström	37	Örebro	Day 1	Day 56	9th Evicted; Day 56	8th
Anton Tsvetkov	29	Lenhovda	Day 1	Day 57	10th Evicted; Day 57	7th
Sofie Pettersson	28	Gothenburg	Day 1	Day 63	11th Evicted; Day 63	6th
Pernilla Wallette	47	Jät	Day 1	Day 64	12th Evicted; Day 64	5th
Camilla Lööke	26	Stockholm	Day 1	Day 66	13th Evicted; Day 66	4th
Nina Wahlin	47	Södertälje	Day 1	Day 68	14th Evicted; Day 68	3rd
Lina Ilar	22	Falun	Day 1	Day 69	Runner-up; Day 69	2nd
Fredrik Rosenkvist	25	Lund	Day 1	Day 69	Winner; Day 69	1st

== The game ==
Week	Farmer of the Week	1st Dueler	2nd Dueler	Evicted	Finish
1	Robin	Ali	Morgan	Ali	1st Evicted; Day 7
2	Robin	Morgan	Paul	Paul	2nd Evicted; Day 14
3	Lina	Sara-Marie	Gunvor	Gunvor	3rd Evicted; Day 21
4	Sara-Marie	Ewonne	Sofie	Ewonne	4th Evicted; Day 28
5	Göran	Sara-Marie	Pernilla	Sara-Marie	5th Evicted; Day 35
6	Nina	Anton	Hampus	Hampus	6th Evicted; Day 42
6	Nina	All (Note: All the contestants competed in a sudden elimination duel. As Göran was the last to finish, he was eliminated from the farm.)		Göran	7th Evicted; Day 43
7	Fredrik	Anton	Robin	Robin	8th Evicted; Day 49
8	Fredrik	Nina	Morgan	Morgan	9th Evicted; Day 56
8	Fredrik	Sofie	Anton	Anton	10th Evicted; Day 57
9	Pernilla (Note: Although Pernilla was the head of the farm, in the second set of duels, her head of farm title was taken away, making her compete in a duel against Nina.)	Camilla	Sofie	Sofie	11th Evicted; Day 63
9	Pernilla	Nina	Pernilla	Pernilla	12th Evicted; Day 64
10	None	All	All	Camilla	11th Evicted; Day 66
10	None	All	All	Nina	12th Evicted; Day 68
10	None	All	All	Lina	Runner-up; Day 69
10	None	All	All	Fredrik	Winner; Day 69
