= Farmi =

- Season 1
- Presented by: Ellen Jokikunnas
- No. of days: 50
- No. of castaways: 12
- Winner: Sanni Korva
- Runner-up: Jenni Peräaho
- Location: Finland
- No. of episodes: 50

Release
- Original network: Nelonen
- Original release: 3 February – 14 April 2014

Additional information
- Filming dates: July – September 2013

Farmi (The Farm) is the first and only season of the first Finnish version of The Farm. 12 ordinary Finns come to The Farm and compete in challenges to try and live as it was in the 1800s for 50 days where they also try to be the last farmer standing to win the grand prize of €30,000. The series was hosted by Ellen Jokikunnas with the season premiering on 3 February 2014 on Nelonen and concluding on 14 April 2014 where Sanni Korva won in the final challenge against Jenni Peräaho to win the grand prize and the title of Farmi 2014.

== Finishing order ==
(age are stated at time of competition)

Contestant	Age	Residence	Entered	Exited	Status	Finish
Seida Sohrabi	22	Vaasa	Day 1	Day 5	1st Evicted; Day 5	12th
Sebastién Pyykönen	22	Helsinki	Day 1	Day 8	Left Competition; Day 8	11th
Suvi Pehkonen	32	Helsinki	Day 1	Day 15	2nd Evicted; Day 15	10th
Mika Liukkonen	41	Lahti	Day 1	Day 20	3rd Evicted; Day 20	9th
Vesa Jussila	42	Kuopio	Day 1	Day 25	4th Evicted; Day 25	8th
Juha-Pekka “Pekka” Boelius	60	Joensuu	Day 1	Day 30	5th Evicted; Day 30	7th
Marko Suomi	43	Orimattila	Day 1	Day 35	6th Evicted; Day 35	6th
Sini Harjula	18	Riihimäki	Day 1	Day 40	7th Evicted; Day 40	5th
Tuulikki Timgren-Lillukkamäki	66	Pusula	Day 1	Day 45	8th Evicted; Day 45	4th
Joni Hermanni Kaulanen	23	Rovaniemi	Day 1	Day 50	9th Evicted; Day 50	3rd
Jenni Peräaho	28	Turku	Day 1	Day 50	Runner-up; Day 50	2nd
Sanni Korva	22	Kittilä	Day 1	Day 50	Winner; Day 50	1st

== The game ==
Week	Farmer of the Week	Butlers	1st Duelist	2nd Duelist	Evicted	Finish
1	Pekka	Marko; Sanni	Sanni	Seida	Seida	1st Evicted; Day 5
2	Vesa	Jenni; ~~Sebastién (Note: After Sebastién left the game, Vesa as Head of the Farm had to name a replacement butler in Sebastién's place. He chose Marko as the new butler.)~~ Marko	Marko	Joni	Sebastién	Left Competition; Day 8
2	Vesa	Jenni; ~~Sebastién~~; Marko	Marko	Joni	Joni	Saved; Day 10 (Note: Due to Sebastién leaving the game. Joni, though he lost the duel, was spared from elimination.)
3	Vesa	Marko; Suvi	Suvi	Tuulikki	Suvi	3rd Evicted; Day 15
4	Tuulikki	Mika; Sini	Mika	Vesa	Mika	3rd Evicted; Day 20
5	Marko	Sanni; Vesa	Vesa	Pekka	Vesa	4th Evicted; Day 25
6	Marko	Joni; Sini	Sini	Pekka	Pekka	5th Evicted; Day 30
7	Jenni	Marko; Tuulikki	Marko	Joni	Marko	6th Evicted; Day 35
8	Sanni	Tuulikki; Jenni	Jenni	Sini	Sini	7th Evicted; Day 40
9	Jenni	Sanni; Tuulikki	Tuulikki	Sanni	Tuulikki	8th Evicted; Day 45
10	Jury	None	Jenni	Joni	Joni	9th Evicted; Day 50
10	Jury	None	Sanni	Jenni	Jenni	Runner-up; Day 50
10	Jury	None	Sanni	Jenni	Sanni	Winner; Day 50
