= Farmi Suomi 2022 =

- Season 3
- Presented by: Susanna Laine
- No. of days: 30
- No. of castaways: 16
- Winner: Teemu Packalén
- Runner-up: Taina Ojaniemi
- Location: Pieksämäki, Finland

Release
- Original network: Nelonen
- Original release: 12 February – 21 May 2022

Season chronology
- ← Previous; Farmi Suomi 2021 Next → Farmi Suomi 2023

Farmi Suomi 2022 (The Farm Finland 2022) is the third season of the Finnish version of The Farm. 15 celebrities travel to a farm in Pieksämäki, Finland where they will live on the farm like it was 100 years prior and complete tasks to maintain the farm whilst trying to be the last farmer standing. The winner of the season will win a grand prize of €30,000. The season is presented for the first time by Susanna Laine with the season premiering on 12 February 2022 on Nelonen.

== Finishing order ==
(age are stated at time of competition)

Contestant	Age	Background	Entered	Exited	Status	Finish
Kelly Kalonji	34	Model	Day 1	Day 3	1st Evicted; Day 3	16th
Maiju Voutilainen	25	YouTuber	Day 1	Day 3	2nd Evicted; Day 3	15th
Henny Harjusola	27	Beauty Blogger	Day 1	Day 6	3rd Evicted; Day 6	14th
Tauski Peltonen	58	Singer	Day 1	Day 9	4th Evicted; Day 9	13th
Juhana Helmenkalastaja	47	Clothing Stylist	Day 7	Day 12	5th Evicted; Day 12	12th
Cristal Snow	46	Musician	Day 1	Day 15	6th Evicted; Day 15	11th
Kristian Heiskari	29	Reality TV Personality	Day 1	Day 18	7th Evicted; Day 18	10th
Pauliina Laitinen	50	Art Expert	Day 1	Day 20	Withdrew; Family Emergency; Day 20	9th
Raija Pelli	64	Journalist	Day 19	Day 21	8th Evicted; Day 21	8th
Atte Kaleva	42	Politician	Day 1	Day 24	9th Evicted; Day 24	7th
Akseli Herlevi	35	TV Chef	Day 1	Day 25	10th Evicted; Day 25	6th
Sani Aartela	50	Singer	Day 1	Day 26	11th Evicted; Day 26	5th
Sanna Mämmi	49	Former Radio Presenter	Day 1	Day 28	12th Evicted; Day 28	4th
Constantinos "Gogi" Mavromichalis	34	Actor	Day 1	Day 30	13th Evicted; Day 30	3rd
Taina Ojaniemi	44	Former Javelin Thrower	Day 1	Day 30	Runner-up; Day 30	2nd
Teemu Packalén	34	Mixed Martial Artist	Day 1	Day 30	Winner; Day 30	1st

== The game ==
Week	Farmer of the Week	1st Dueler	2nd Dueler	Evicted	Finish
1	N/A (Note: The contestants competed in challenges to claim spots on the Farm. As a result, there was no Farmer of the Week.)	Sani	Kelly	Kelly	1st Evicted; Day 3
1	N/A	Sani	Maiju	Maiju	2nd Evicted; Day 3
2	Sani	Tauski	Henny	Henny	3rd Evicted; Day 6
3	Cristal	Tauski	Atte	Tauski	4th Evicted; Day 9
4	Atte	Juhana	Cristal	Juhana	5th Evicted; Day 12
5	Kristian	Sani	Cristal	Cristal	6th Evicted; Day 15
6	Taina	Pauliina	Kristian	Kristian	7th Evicted; Day 18
7	Teemu	Raija	Akseli	Pauliina	Withdrew; Family Emergency; Day 20
7	Teemu	Raija	Akseli	Raija	8th Evicted; Day 21
8	Taina	Taina	Teemu	Teemu	None (Note: Due to Pauliina leaving the Farm the previous week to a family emergency, the duel held this week was that the winner would be immune for the next two duels.Taina won the duel and became immune for the next two subsequent duels.)
9	Gogi	Atte	Sanna	Atte	9th Evicted; Day 24
10	Teemu	Sani	Akseli	Akseli	10th Evicted; Day 25
11	Teemu	Sanna	Sani	Sani	11th Evicted; Day 26
12	Taina	Teemu	Sanna	Sanna	12th Evicted; Day 28
13	Jury	Gogi	Teemu	Gogi	13th Evicted; Day 30
13	Jury	Taina	Teemu	Taina	Runner-up; Day 30
13	Jury	Taina	Teemu	Teemu	Winner; Day 30
