= Strix (TV production company) =

Swedish television production company

Strix Television
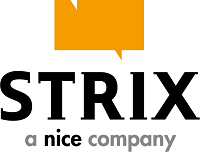
- Type: Subsidiary
- Industry: Television
- Founded: 1988; 38 years ago
- Founder: Kinnevik AB
- Headquarters: Stockholm, Sweden
- Parent: Modern Times Group (1988–2018); Nice Entertainment Group (2013-2018); Nordic Entertainment Group (2018–2021); Fremantle (2021–present)
- Website: strix.se

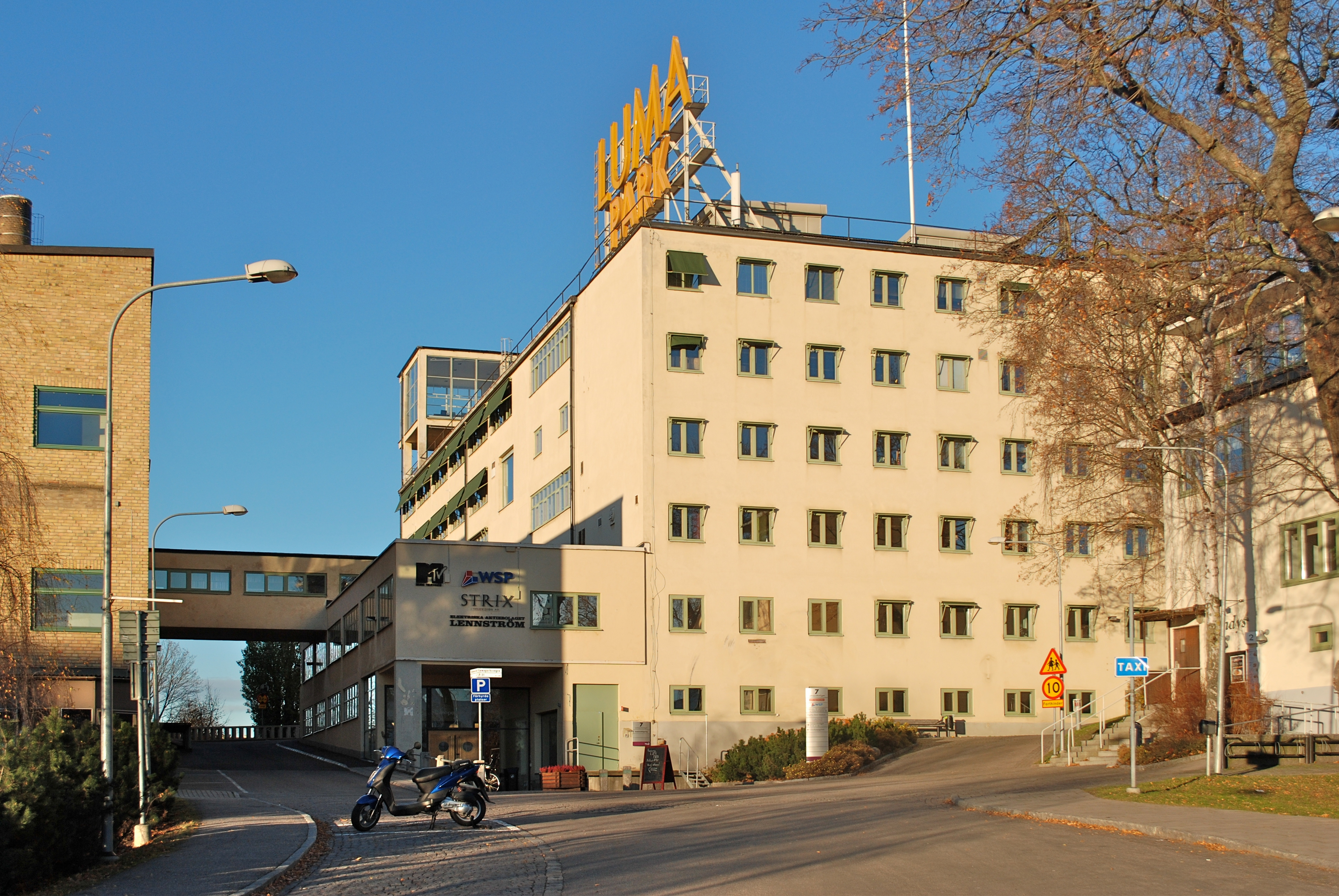
Strix' offices in the Luma factory

STRIX Television is a Swedish television production company that was founded in 1988. The Swedish mother company, at the time owned by MTG, had offices in Amsterdam, Copenhagen, Oslo, Tel Aviv and Prague. Today, there are two individual companies named Strix, Strix Television in Sweden and Strix Televisjon in Norway, both owned by Fremantle.

It is a major international contributor to the format of reality television known as 'Survivor'. Since 1997 Strix has produced Expedition Robinson for an ever-increasing audience throughout Europe. The company has also developed, produced and distributed other reality formats, such as The Farm, The Bar, and Harem.

STRIX Survivor games worldwide:

- Survivor
- Expedition Robinson
