= Mikael Jungner =

Finnish politician (born 1965)

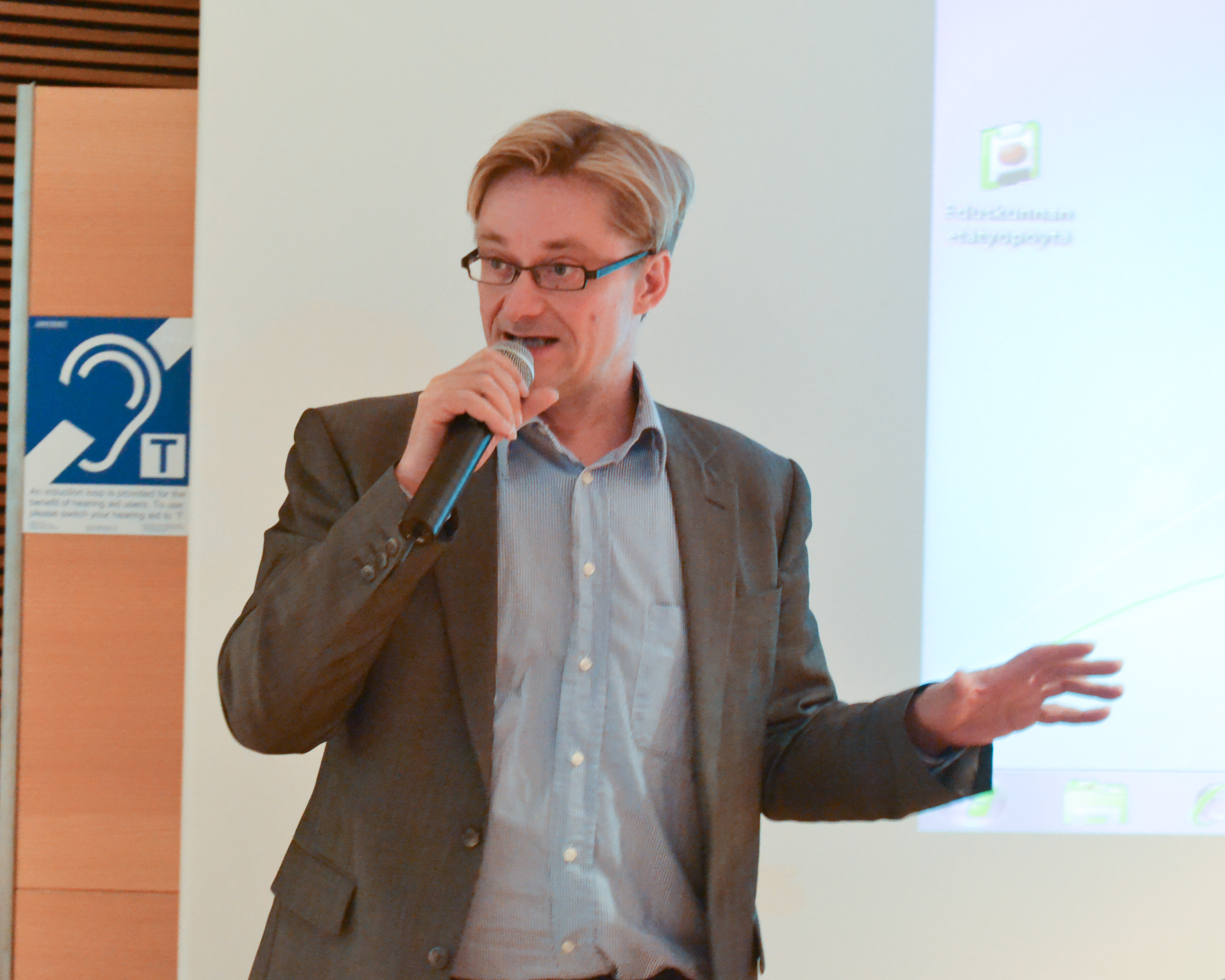
Mikael Jungner

Mikael Jungner (born 20 April 1965 in Helsinki), is the former party secretary of the Social Democratic Party of Finland, a member of the Finnish parliament, and a former managing director of the Finnish national broadcaster Yle.

Junger grew up on the Finnish West Coast in the city of Vaasa. He started a five-year term as Managing Director of Yle on 1 May 2005. Although he sought another term, the political board of Yle replaced him with Lauri Kivinen, a member of National Coalition Party, on 1 May 2010. Jungner's term as the managing director of Yle is generally considered to have been a success.

Jungner was the director of information society relations at the Microsoft Corporation between 2002 and 2004. He was the former aide of the previous prime minister, Paavo Lipponen. It is commonly understood that Lipponen helped Jungner get the Managing Director's position in Yle. In May 2010, Jungner was elected as the party secretary of the SDP. Jungner's term proved to be a disappointment for the Social Democratic Party, which lost the 2015 elections.

Jungner, who belongs to the right-wing section of the Social Democratic Party of Finland, is a regular writer in Libera's web-pages, a libertarian foundation co-ordinated with Mont Pelerin Society and staffed with members known to finance National Coalition Party.

Mikael Jungner was married to Yle presenter Maria Jungner from 2007 to 2013. Currently he lives with Emilia Poikkeus, who is 26 years his junior.
