= Ellen Jokikunnas =

Finnish model and television host

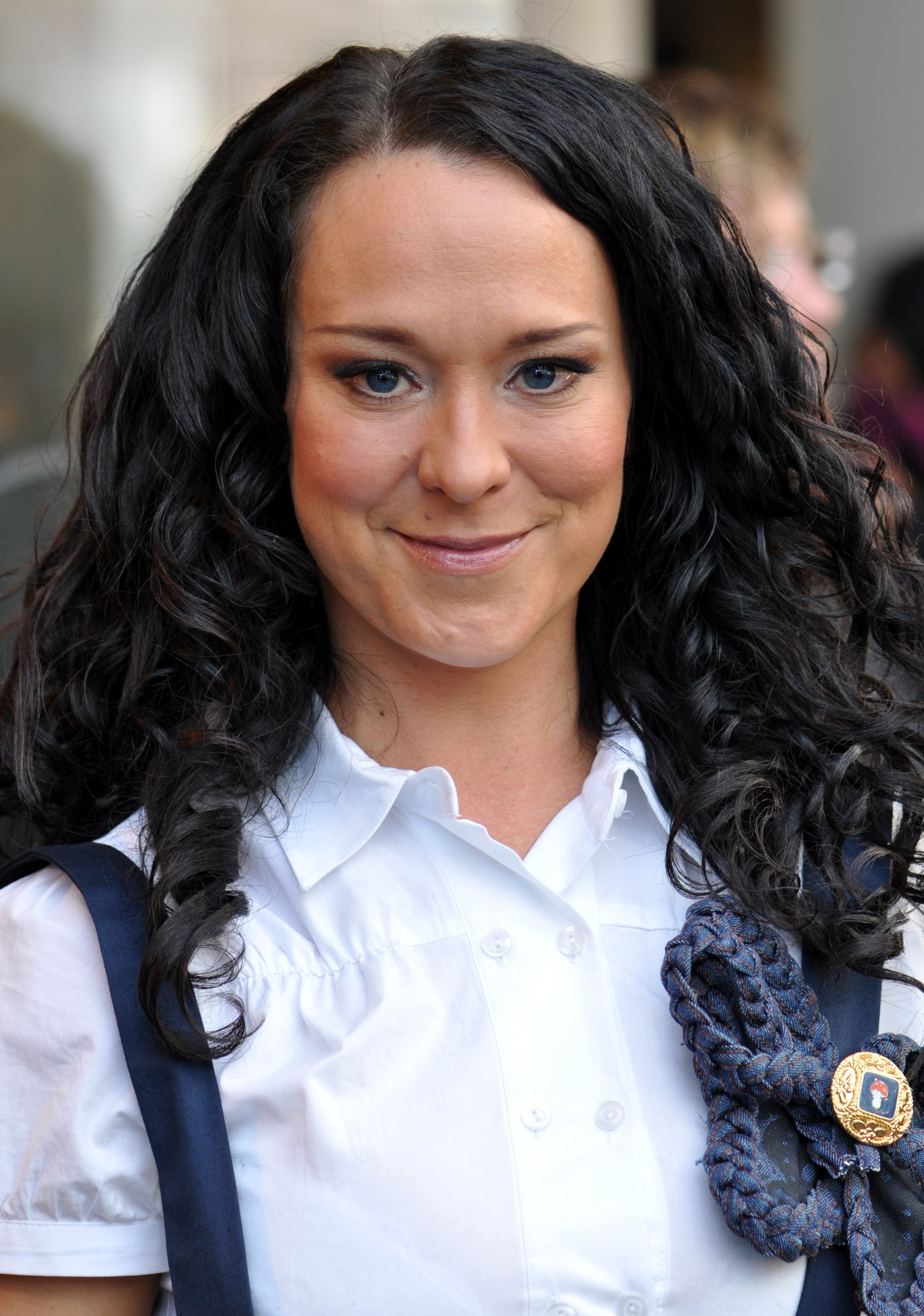
Ellen Jokikunnas in April 2009.

Ellen Jokikunnas (born 18 November 1976) is a Finnish model, PR manager, and television presenter. She is best known for hosting all four seasons of Idols, but her first fame came from competing in the Miss Finland pageant in 1998. Besides Idols, she has hosted the children's quiz show Suuri kupla ("Big Bubble"), as well as her own traveling show, Ellen Express.

== Biography ==
Jokikunnas was born in Janakkala, and has three brothers and sisters: Emil, Anton and Ida. She has lived in Turku, but moved later to Helsinki, and has later bought an old railway station from Röykkä, Nurmijärvi, which she is renovating as her new home. The renovation is documented on TV on Joka kodin asuntomarkkinat. Jokikunnas is married. In April 2023, Jokikunnas and her husband bought a house in Italy.

She is also known as an active traveler, who survived the 2004 Indian Ocean earthquake in Sri Lanka.

Jokikunnas experienced some questionable publicity when her insinuations about Pamela Anderson's breasts and hepatitis C while hosting Raumanmeren juhannus ("The Midsummer Festivals of Rauma") in 2007 – where Anderson was a VIP performer – caused a stir in Finnish tabloids.

== Filmography ==
As a television host
Year	Title	Notes
2002–2003	Suuri kupla	
2003–2011	Idols	41 episodes
2004	V.I.P. Seikkailu	
2005	Ellen Express	
2007	Eurovision Song Contest 2007	Finnish commentator
2011	Stage	
2013	Fort Boyard Suomi	
2013	Splash!	4 episodes
2014–2021	Farmi	51 episodes
2018	Kadonneen jäljillä	8 episodes
2019	Asuntokaupat sokkona	10 episodes
2020	Mental Samurai Suomi	
