= Promofilm =

Argentine television production company

Promofilm

Promofilm is an audiovisual production company based in Argentina, belonging to the Spanish Grupo Globomedia. Was founded in 1990 innovating and adapting television formats, not only in Argentina but also outside. In 1995 joined agreement with Globomedia to share programs and formats.

Promofilm continued to expand, and currently has offices in several American countries (USA, Chile, Mexico, Brazil). Each has its own production center and local professionals. Since 2000 is part of Grupo Globomedia. By pioneering new formats has become the leading producer of television in Argentina, and thanks to good international infrastructure has worked on five continents.
