= Kmetija 2018 =

Eighth season of the Slovene version of The Farm TV show

- Season 9
- Presented by: Natalija Bratkovič
- No. of days: 65
- No. of castaways: 17
- Winner: Franko Bajc
- Runner-up: Denis Toplak
- Location: Velika Polana, Slovenia

Release
- Original network: Pop TV
- Original release: September 24 – December 15, 2018

Season chronology
- ← Previous; Kmetija 2017 Next → Kmetija 2019

Kmetija 2018 (The Farm 2018) was the ninth season of the Slovene version of The Farm, a reality television show based on the Swedish television series of the similar name. The season is filmed in Velika Polana where the main twist in this season is that in addition to new contestants, some of the contestants are reality television stars from different series. Unbeknownst to the other contestants, former Kmetija contestants are also returning. These contestants have to try to convince the other contestants that they are ordinary traders looking for supplies, whilst stealing the supplies for themselves. The season premiered on 24 September 2018 on POP TV and concluded with a live finale on 15 December 2018 in Ljubljana where former Survivor contestant Franko Bajc won in the final duel against former Kmetija winner Denis Toplak to win €50,000 and the title of Kmetija 2018.

== Finishing order ==
All contestants entered on Day 1, however those from previous seasons of Kmetija (minus Aneta) had to live in the forest for 20 days without getting caught in order to enter the farm and become competitors.

Contestant	Age on entry	Residence	Entered	Exited	Season/Notability	Status	Finish
Ksenija Kranjec	27	Velenje	Day 1	Day 5	Big Brother 2015	Quit; Day 5	17th
Sandi Sinanović	30	Celje	Day 1	Day 10	Survivor: Filipini	1st Evicted; Day 10	16th
Joel Srbu	29	Ljubljana	Day 1	Day 15	Bar 2015	2nd Evicted; Day 15	15th
Franc Sever	58	Destrnik	Day 1	Day 20	New	3rd Evicted; Day 20	14th
Simona Nagy	36	Lendava	Day 1	Day 25	New	4th Evicted; Day 25	13th
Luka Serdinšek Betlehem	30	Ljubljana	Day 1	Day 30	New	5th Evicted; Day 30	12th
Lara Goršek Kos	26	Jesenje	Day 21	Day 30	Kmetija 2014	6th Evicted; Day 30	11th
Miha Kavčič	29	Ljubljana	Day 21	Day 35	Kmetija 2014	7th Evicted; Day 35	10th
Tjaša Šalamun	25	Ptuj	Day 1	Day 40	New	8th Evicted; Day 40	9th
Zdenka Urbanc	62	Velenje	Day 1	Day 45	New	9th Evicted; Day 45	8th
Sabina Mlakar †	53	Grosuplje	Day 21	Day 50	Kmetija 2017	10th Evicted; Day 50	7th
Anna Paynich	38	Logatec	Day 1	Day 55	MasterChef 2018	11th Evicted; Day 55	6th
Alexander Bakharev	31	Ljubljana	Day 21	Day 60	Kmetija 2008	12th Evicted; Day 60	5th
Nik Triler	18	Notranje Gorice	Day 1	Day 65	New	13th Evicted; Day 65	4th
Aneta Andollini	32	Ljubljana	Day 1	Day 65	Survivor: Filipini; Kmetija Slavnih	14th Evicted; Day 65	3rd
Denis Toplak	31	Fram	Day 21	Day 65	Kmetija 2014	Runner-up; Day 65	2nd
Franko Bajc	23	Ajdovščina	Day 1	Day 65	Survivor: Filipini	Winner; Day 65	1st

== The game ==
Week	Head of Farm	Butlers	1st Dueler	2nd Dueler	Evicted	Finish
1	Franko	Aneta; Joel	Aneta	Ksenija	Ksenija	Quit; Day 5
2	Franc	Sandi; Simona	Sandi	Joel	Sandi	1st Evicted; Day 10
3	Franko	Aneta; Franc	Franc	Joel	Joel	2nd Evicted; Day 15
4	Nik	Franko; Tjaša	Franko	Franc	Franc	3rd Evicted; Day 20
5	Zdenka	Nik; Tjaša	Tjaša	Simona	Simona	4th Evicted; Day 25
6	Denis	Aneta; Nik	Aneta & Franko*	Luka & Lara*	Luka & Lara	5th-6th Evicted; Day 30
7	Franko	Miha; Zdenka	Miha	Tjaša	Miha	7th Evicted; Day 35
8	Denis	Aneta; Franko	Franko	Tjaša	Tjaša	8th Evicted; Day 40
9	Nik	Anna; Franko	Anna	Zdenka	Zdenka	9th Evicted; Day 45
10	Franko	Aneta; Denis	Denis	Sabina	Sabina	10th Evicted; Day 50
11	Jury	None	Alexander	Anna	Anna	11th Evicted; Day 55
12	Jury	None	Aneta	Alexander	Alexander	12th Evicted; Day 60
13	Public {Franko} (Note: The public voted to see who would automatically make it to the final two, and who would be eliminated without a duel. The public voted for Franko to make the final two and Nik to be automatically eliminated.)	None	All		Nik	13th Evicted; Day 65
13	Public {Franko}	None	Aneta	Denis	Aneta	14th Evicted; Day 65
13	Public {Franko}	None	Franko	Denis	Denis	Runner-up; Day 65
13	Public {Franko}	None	Franko	Denis	Franko	Winner; Day 65

*In week 6, the rules of dueling were changed, and the duels now happen in pairs. A vote is performed to determine the first pair to compete, and the second pair is chosen by the first pair. The pair that loses is evicted.
