= Kmetija 2022 =

- Season 12
- Presented by: Natalija Bratkovič
- No. of days: 75
- No. of castaways: 20
- Winner: Tom Zupan
- Runner-up: Aljaž Pušnik
- Location: Znojile pri Krki, Slovenia

Release
- Original network: Pop TV
- Original release: August 31 – December 15, 2022

Season chronology
- ← Previous; Kmetija 2021 Next → Kmetija 2023

Kmetija 2022 (The Farm 2022) is the twelfth season of the Slovene reality television series Kmetija. The season takes place on a newly built farm estate in the Lower Carniola of Slovenia. Natalija Bratkovič returns to host with 16 new Slovenians live like it was 100 years prior to try and run a farm whilst trying to avoid being eliminated via duels to make it to the end and win a grand prize of €50,000 and the title of Kmetija 2022. The season premieres on Pop TV on 31 August 2022.

== Contestants ==
Amongst the contestants are former Ljubezen po domače 2021 contestant Manja Šernek and YouTuber Ivan Šmergut.

Contestant	Age on entry	Residence	Entered	Exited	Starting Team	Status	Finish
Valerija Ogulin	20	Semič	Day 1	Day 5	Blue	1st Evicted; Day 5	20th
Damijan Forjanič	25	Maribor	Day 1	Day 10	Blue	2nd Evicted; 1st Jury Member; Day 10	19th
Vladislav Antić	25	Ljubljana	Day 1	Day 15	Red	3rd Evicted; Day 15	18th
Jožica Jurjevčič	61	Škofja Loka	Day 1	Day 20	Blue	4th Evicted; Day 20	17th
Aleš Kozic	42	Draženci	Day 1	Day 20	Blue	5th Evicted; Day 20	16th
Peter Schweitzer	47	Ljubljana	Day 1	Day 20	Red	6th Evicted; 2nd Jury Member; Day 20	15th
Karin Štangelj	22	Šentjernej	Day 1	Day 25	Red	7th Evicted; Day 25	14th
Jan Zadravec	24	Vrhnika	Day 1	Day 30	Red	8th Evicted; Day 30	13th
Monika Nastja Sotenšek	27	Litija	Day 1	Day 35	Blue	9th Evicted; 3rd Jury Member; Day 35	12th
Andrea Libič	29	Logatec	Day 1	Day 40	Red	10th Evicted; 4th Jury Member; Day 40	11th
Denis Kunštek	25	Rogatec	Day 1	Day 45	Blue	Ejected; 5th Jury Member; Day 45	10th
Maja Triler	31	Ljubljana	Day 1	Day 50	Red	11th Evicted; 6th Jury Member; Day 50	9th
Karin Lipovnik	25	Dravograd	Day 3	Day 55	Challenger	12th Evicted; 7th Jury Member; Day 55	8th
Aneta Andollini	36	Ljubljana	Day 20	Day 60	Challenger	13th Evicted; 8th Jury Member; Day 60	7th
Manja Šernek	24	Portorož	Day 1	Day 65	Red	14th Evicted; 9th Jury Member; Day 65	6th
Jan Zarnik	23	Rova	Day 1	Day 70	Blue	15th Evicted; 10th Jury Member; Day 70	5th
Ivan Šmergut	32	Trbovlje	Day 1	Day 71	Red	Quit due to Injury; Day 71	4th
Danijela Medenjak	28	Šmartno ob Paki	Day 1	Day 73	Blue	16th Evicted; Day 73	3rd
Aljaž Pušnik	22	Trzin	Day 8	Day 75	Challenger	Runner-up; Day 75	2nd
Tom Zupan	23	Kranj	Day 13	Day 75	Challenger	Winner; Day 75	1st

== Challengers ==
New this season consists of Challengers. Four former contestants of Kmetija live in a tent competing in a challenge against the duelists for a chance to replace them and enter the farm as fully integrated contestants.

Contestant	Age on entry	Residence	Season	Entered	Exited	Status	Finish
Karin Lipovnik	25	Dravograd	2021	Day 1	Day 3	Won Duel; Entered Farm; Day 3	1st
Aljaž Pušnik	22	Trzin	2021	Day 1	Day 8	Won Duel; Entered Farm; Day 8	2nd
Damijan Forjanič	25	Maribor	2022	Day 3	Day 8	Won Duel; Returned to Farm; Day 8	3rd
Tom Zupan	23	Kranj	2019	Day 1	Day 13	Won Duel; Entered Farm; Day 13	4th
Jan Zarnik	23	Rova	2022	Day 13	Day 20	Won Duel; Returned to Farm; Day 20	5th
Aneta Andollini	36	Ljubljana	Slavnih; 2018	Day 1	Day 20	Won Duel; Entered Farm; Day 20	6th
Karin Štangelj	22	Šentjernej	2022	Day 8	Day 21	Returned to Farm; Day 21	7th
Monika Nastja Sotenšek	27	Litija	2022	Day 20	Day 21	Returned to Farm; Day 21	8th
Aleš Kozic	42	Draženci	2022	Day 8	Day 20	Lost Duel; Day 20	9th

== The game ==
Week	Head of Farm	1st Dueler	2nd Dueler	Evicted	Finish
1	Aleš; Maja (Note: For the first week, the contestants were divided into two teams with each team having their own Head of Farm.)	~~Peter~~ (Note: As Maja's family won the weekly task, Peter and Jan Zad. as duelists, were immune and did not compete in a duel.); ~~Damijan~~; Karin L. (Note: Peter and Damijan competed in a duel against Aneta and Karin L. respectively to see who'd be sent to the Challenges tent, and who'd stayed on the farm. Peter won his duel and stayed but Damijan lost his duel against Karin L. removing him from the duel on the main farm and being replaced by Karin L.)	~~Jan Zad.~~; Valerija	Valerija	1st Evicted; Day 5
2	Jan Zar. Maja	~~Aleš~~; ~~Karin Š.~~ (Note: Aleš and Karin Š. completed against challengers Aljaž and Damijan for a spot on the farm. They were both defeated and replaced by them.); Aljaž; Damijan	Denis; Vladislav	Damijan	2nd Evicted; Day 10
3	Andrea; Danijela	Ivan; ~~Jan Zar.~~ (Note: Ivan and Jan Zar. competed in duels against challengers for a spot on the farm. Jan Zar. lost his duel to Tom and was replaced as the first duelist.); ~~Tom~~	~~Denis~~ (Note: As Tom and Denis' team won the weekly challenge they were no longer duelists and were immune from the duel.); Vladislav	Vladislav	3rd Evicted; Day 15
4	Danijela; Ivan	Aneta; Aleš; Monika; Peter	~~Jan Zad.~~; ~~Jan Zar.~~; Jožica	Jožica	4th Evicted; Day 20
4	Danijela; Ivan	Aneta; Aleš; Monika; Peter	~~Jan Zad.~~; ~~Jan Zar.~~; Jožica	Aleš	5th Evicted; Day 20
4	Danijela; Ivan	Aneta; Aleš; Monika; Peter	~~Jan Zad.~~; ~~Jan Zar.~~; Jožica	Peter	6th Evicted; Day 20
5	Denis; Ivan	Karin Š. ~~Maja~~ (Note: As Ivan's family won the weekly task, their duelists (Maja and Monika) were made immune from the duel.)	Danijela; ~~Monika~~	Karin Š.	7th Evicted; Day 25
6	Aneta; Manja	Jan Zad. ~~Tom~~ (Note: Tom and Ivan's family won the weekly task and therefore were subsequently immune from the duel.)	Denis; ~~Ivan~~	Jan Zad.	8th Evicted; Day 30
7	Danijela; Manja	~~Denis~~ (Note: Denis and Jan Zar's family won the weekly task and were therefore immune from the duel.); Maja	~~Jan Zar.~~; Monika	Monika	9th Evicted; Day 35
8	Danijela; Maja	Andrea; ~~Denis~~ (Note: As Denis and Jan Zar's family won the weekly challenge, they became immune from the duel.)	Tom; ~~Jan Zar.~~	Andrea	10th Evicted; Day 40
9	Tom	Maja	Danijela	Denis	Ejected; Day 45
9	Tom	Maja	Danijela	Danijela	Won Head of Farm; Day 45 (Note: After Denis was ejected from the farm, the duel continued but instead of competing to stay, the duelists competed to see who would be next week's Head of the Farm.)
10	Danijela	Maja	Karin L.	Maja	11th Evicted; Day 50
11	Danijela	Karin L.	Manja	Karin L.	12th Evicted; Day 55
12	Manja	Aneta; Jan Zar.	Aljaž	Aneta	13th Evicted; Day 60
13	Aljaž	Manja	Danijela	Manja	14th Evicted; Day 65
14	None	Jan Zar.	Ivan	Jan Zar.	15th Evicted; Day 70
15	Jury	Danijela	Tom	Ivan	Quit due to Injury; Day 71
15	Jury	Danijela	Tom	Danijela	16th Evicted; Day 73
16	None	Aljaž	Tom	Aljaž	Runner-up; Day 75
16	None	Aljaž	Tom	Tom	Winner; Day 75
