= Kmetija: Nov začetek 2014 =

- Season 5
- Presented by: Saša Lendero
- No. of days: 109
- No. of castaways: 18
- Winner: Denis Toplak
- Runner-up: Darinka Košenina
- Location: Kukeč, Slovenia

Release
- Original network: Planet TV
- Original release: August 31 – December 13, 2014

Season chronology
- ← Previous; Kmetija 2011 Next → Kmetija 2015

Kmetija: Nov začetek 2014 (The Farm: A New Beginning 2014) is the fifth season of the Slovene reality television series Kmetija and the first season of the Kmetija: Nov začetek edition to air on Planet TV. The season is the first to be hosted by Saša Lendero who leads contestants during duels and nominations as the contestants live on a farm like it was 100 years in Kukeč, Slovenia where prior to making it to the end and win the grand prize of €50,000. The season premiered on 31 August 2014 and concluded on 13 December 2014 where Denis Toplak won in the final duel against Darinka Košenina to win the grand prize and be crowned the winner of Kmetija: Nov začetek 2014.

== Contestants ==
| Contestant | Age on entry | Residence | Entered | Exited | Status | Finish |
|---|---|---|---|---|---|---|
| Elizabet Bordon | 26 | Marezige | Day 1 | Day 7 | 1st Evicted; 1st Jury Member; Day 7 | 18th |
| Kuharica "Kamala" Kamala | 31 | Tenetiše | Day 1 | Day 14 | 2nd Evicted; Day 14 | 17th |
| Andrej Pregl | 46 | Spodnje Hoče | Day 1 | Day 21 | 3rd Evicted; Day 21 | 16th |
| Bernarda Hojnik | 19 | Polenšak | Day 29 | Day 35 | 5th Evicted; Day 35 | 15th |
| Kristina Mohorčič | 23 | Šentilj v Slovenskih Goricah | Day 1 | Day 42 | 6th Evicted; Day 42 | 14th |
| Klemen Lopatič | 19 | Krška Vas | Day 1 | Day 49 | 7th Evicted; 2nd Jury Member; Day 49 | 13th |
| Ema Čerin | 35 | Koper | Day 1 | Day 56 | 8th Evicted; 3rd Jury Member; Day 56 | 12th |
| Božo Kodrič | 23 | Premagovce | Day 29 | Day 63 | 9th Evicted; Day 63 | 11th |
| Martin Kodrič | 23 | Premagovce | Day 29 | Day 70 | 10th Evicted; 4th Jury Member; Day 70 | 10th |
| Andrej Zaletel | 50 | Ljubljana | Day 1 | Day 28 | 4th Evicted; Day 28 | 9th |
| Andrej Zaletel | 50 | Ljubljana | Day 29 | Day 75 | Ejected; Day 75 | 9th |
| Miha Kavčič | 25 | Logatec | Day 1 | Day 77 | 11th Evicted; 5th Jury Member; Day 77 | 8th |
| Žana Kopeč | 27 | Celje | Day 1 | Day 84 | 12th Evicted; Day 84 | 7th |
| Lara Goršek Kos | 22 | Jesenje | Day 1 | Day 91 | 13th Evicted; Day 91 | 6th |
| Jasmina Galinec | 28 | Mrzlo Polje | Day 1 | Day 98 | 14th Evicted; Day 98 | 5th |
| Leon Kotnik | 35 | Slovenske Konjice | Day 1 | Day 105 | 15th Evicted; 6th Jury Member; Day 105 | 4th |
| Matej Rupar | 23 | Rob | Day 1 | Day 108 | 16th Evicted; Day 108 | 3rd |
| Darinka Košenina | 45 | Zibika | Day 1 | Day 109 | Runner-up; Day 109 | 2nd |
| Denis Toplak | 27 | Morje | Day 1 | Day 109 | Winner; Day 109 | 1st |

== The game ==
| Week | Head of Farm | Butlers | 1st Dueler | 2nd Dueler | Evicted | Finish |
|---|---|---|---|---|---|---|
| 1 | Andrej Z. | Ema; Jasmina | Jasmina | Elizabet | Elizabet | 1st Evicted; Day 7 |
| 2 | Leon | Kamala; Klemen | Kamala | Lara | Kamala | 2nd Evicted; Day 14 |
| 3 | Matej | Andrej P. Darinka | Andrej P. | Miha | Andrej P. | 3rd Evicted; Day 21 |
| 4 | Klemen | Andrej Z. Leon | Andrej Z. | Denis | Andrej Z. | 4th Evicted; Day 28 |
| 5 | Miha | Darinka; Leon | Darinka | Bernarda | Bernarda | 5th Evicted; Day 35 |
| 6 | Božo | Matej; Žana | Žana | Kristina | Kristina | 6th Evicted; Day 42 |
| 7 | Žana | Andrej Z. Lara | Andrej Z. | Klemen | Klemen | 7th Evicted; Day 49 |
| 8 | Denis | Ema; Martin | Ema | Darinka | Ema | 8th Evicted; Day 56 |
| 9 | Andrej Z. | Božo; Martin | Božo | Matej | Božo | 9th Evicted; Day 63 |
| 10 | Miha | Martin; Žana | Martin | Andrej Z. | Martin | 10th Evicted; Day 70 |
| 11 | Darinka | Denis; Jasmina | Denis | Miha | Andrej Z. | Ejected; Day 75 |
| 11 | Darinka | Denis; Jasmina | Denis | Miha | Miha | 11th Evicted; Day 77 |
| 12 | Leon | Jasmina; Leon | Jasmina | Žana | Žana | 12th Evicted; Day 84 |
| 13 | Denis | Jasmina; Matej | Jasmina | Lara | Lara | 13th Evicted; Day 91 |
| 14 | Darinka | Jasmina; Matej | Jasmina | Denis | Jasmina | 14th Evicted; Day 98 |
| 15 | Darinka | None | Matej | Leon | Leon | 15th Evicted; Day 105 |
| 16 | Jury (Note: The Jury (consisting of eliminated contestants) voted amongst themselves to vote one of the final three to be eliminated from the game. The jury voted to eliminate Matej.) | None | All | | Matej | 16th Evicted; Day 108 |
| 16 | Jury | None | Denis | Darinka | Darinka | Runner-up; Day 109 |
| 16 | Jury | None | Denis | Darinka | Denis | Winner; Day 109 |
