= Kmetija =

Slovenian television series

Kmetija ("The Farm") is a Slovene reality show based on The Farm by Strix. Since 2007, they have recorded the 14th season, the first 3 on Planet TV, and from the 4th on Pop TV. The contestants are fighting for 50,000 thousand euros.

== Format ==
Twelve contestants, six female and six male, live on a farm similar to those from a century ago. There is no running water, bathroom, or internet during the ten-week filming of the show. One contestant is eliminated each week until only one remains; this contestant wins a 50,000 EUR cash grand prize. Every week one contestant is Farm Leader. He chose two servants, one male and one female. Between these two servants, the other contestants chose a first duelist. The first duelist chooses a second dualist and the second dualist chooses a type of duel. There are three possible types of duel: tug of wars, saw or knowledge. If housemates are of different genders, the only duel possible is knowledge. The loser of the duel is eliminated, and he or she writes a letter announcing next week's HOH.

== Cast ==
The first two series were presented by Špela Močnik, the celebrity series was presented by Anja Križnik Tomažin and the fourth season will be presented by Lilly Žagar.

1. Špela Močnik was presenter of the first two seasons of Kmetija. Before she presented Kmetija, she was a radio presenter on the most listened radio station in Slovenia, Radio Hit. She presented Hitova Budilka (Hit's Wakeup Call), the morning show from 6 to 10 A.M.
2. Anja Križnik Tomažin was presenter of Kmetija Slavnih. From 2002 to 2007, she presented "Tistega Lepega Popoldneva" (Eng.: What A Beautilful Afternoon) along with Lado Bizovičar. After TLP she took maternity leave until Kmetija Slavnih.
3. The fourth season of Kmetija will be presented by Lili Žagar. She previously presented Svet na Kanalu A (eng.: World on Channel A) daily news.

In every season is a Farm Master who gives contestants tasks to complete.

1. Marijan Podobnik was Farm Master in the first two seasons, as well as in Week 1 and half of Week 2 of the celebrity edition. He died in Week 2 of Kmetija Slavnih.
2. Vencelj Tušar replaced Marijan Podobnik in week 3 of Kmetija Slavnih. There was no formal announcement whether he will return for the fourth season of Kmetija after 2 years absence.

== Seasons details ==
Year	n	Broadcaster	Live Shows	Winner	The Prize	Presenter	Farm Master	Subtitle
2007	1	POP TV	5	Daša Hliš	50.000 EUR	Špela Močnik	Marijan Podobnik	Prvi resničnostni šov v naravi (First reality Show in Nature)
2008	2	POP TV	5	Cirila Jeršin	50.000 EUR	Špela Močnik	Marijan Podobnik	Dve (Two)
2009	3	POP TV	11	Goran Breščanski	36.300 EUR	Anja Križnik Tomažin	Marijan Podobnik (week 1 & 2$\tfrac{1}{2}$); Vencelj Tušar (week 3 onwards)	(Kmetija) Slavnih ((Farm) of Celebrities)
2011	4	POP TV	11	Matej Drečnik	Farm + 6,300 EUR	Lili Žagar	Vinko Špitaler	(Kmetija) Išče Lastika ((Farm) is looking for owner)
2014	5	Planet TV	1	Denis Toplak	€ 50,000	Saša Lendero	Karolina Črešnar	(Kmetija): Nov začetek (Farm): A new start)
2015	6	Planet TV	1	Fahrudin (Faki) Čaušević	€ 50,000	Saša Lendero	Karolina Črešnar	(Kmetija): Nov začetek (Farm): A new start)
2016	7	Planet TV	1	Adriana Košenina	€ 50,000	Jasna Kuljaj	Karolina Črešnar; Matjaž Zupančič	(Kmetija): Nov začetek (Farm): A new start)
2017	8	POP TV	0	Milena Žižek	€ 60,000	Natalija Bratkovič	Štefan Flisar & Jožef Semen	/
2018	9	POP TV	1	Franko Bajc	€ 50,000	Natalija Bratkovič	Nada Zorec	Kmetija gre naprej! (The Farm Goes On!)
2019	10	POP TV	0	Jan & Tilen Klobasa	€ 50,000	Natalija Bratkovič	Nada Zorec	
2021	11	POP TV	0	Tilen Brglez	€ 50,000	Natalija Bratkovič	Nada Zorec	
2022	12	POP TV	0	Tom Zupan	€ 50,000	Natalija Bratkovič	Nada Zorec	
2023	13	POP TV	0	Žan Simonič	€ 50,000	Natalija Bratkovič	Nada Zorec	Kmetija X
2024	14	POP TV	0	Tim Novak	€ 50,000	Natalija Bratkovič	Nada Zorec	
2026	15	POP TV	0	Aleksandra April	€ 50,000	Natalija Bratkovič	Nada Zorec	
2027	16	POP TV	TBD	TBD	€ 50,000	Natalija Bratkovič	Nada Zorec	

== Broadcasting ==
POP TV has broadcast all seasons of Kmetija. There are five or six episodes in one week, depending on the season.

Year	Season	Episodes
2007	1	In first season of Kmetija, five episodes aired per week; Tuesday, Wednesday and Thursday were broadcast at 10:00 pm CET and in Friday and Saturday were broadcast at 9:00 pm CET. The episodes were aired over 10 weeks. In the eleventh week there were four live talk shows and one live finale on Saturday. This final week's episodes aired at 8:00 pm CET. All episodes were broadcast by POP TV and were at least 60 minutes in length with commercials.
2008	2	The second series format is much the same as that of the first season. However, all episodes were broadcast at 8:00 pm CET.
2009	Slavnih	In Kmetija Slavnih, the broadcasting format changed. Daily highlights episodes on Tuesday, Wednesday, Thursday, Friday and Saturday at 8:00 pm used the same format as in Kmetija 2. But weekly live shows were introduced on Monday nights at 9:00 pm CET. Live shows ran at least 120 minutes with commercials.
2011	4	Kmetija Išče Lastika was broadcast six nights a week. Five daily shows (Tuesday through Friday, 60 minutes; Saturday, 80 minutes) were broadcast at 8 pm CET. One live show (90 minutes) was broadcast on Sunday at 8 pm. All episodes were broadcast by POP TV.

== Grand Prize ==
In the live finale, a winner is chosen. The winner must win at least two duels out of three. The winner in Kmetija 1 and Kmetija 2 won 50,000 € in cash. They were Daša Hliš (Kmetija 1) and Cirila Jeržin (Kmetija 2). In Kmetija Slavnih, a sequins system was introduced. Each week contestants could earn 50 sequins, but they could also spend it. Each sequin is worth 100 €. Goran Breščanski from Kmetija Slavnih won 36,300 €. In the fourth season of Kmetija, the winner won a farm on which the contestants lived for the show along with 12 ha of land.

Viewers elect the People's Winner. In season 1 Klemen and in season 2 Goran Leban won a car, and in Kmetija Slavnih Goran Leban won a car.

== Ratings ==
Soon after the launch of the first season of Kmetija, it became the number one reality show. Kmetija's best rating share was 59%, while Big Brother's best rating share was 43%.

== Controversy ==
In 2007, a criminal complaint was filed against POP TV over the inclusion of the slaughter of a pig in a Kmetija broadcast.

The 2009 series (Kmetija slavnih, "Celebrity Farm") caused POP TV to be cited by Slovenia's telecommunications regulatory agency (APEK) for failing to protect children and young people against explicit scenes of sex and violence. The producers were ordered to issue a parental guidance notice.
