= Kmetija: Nov začetek 2015 =

- Season 6
- Presented by: Saša Lendero
- No. of days: 90
- No. of castaways: 19
- Winner: Fahrudin "Faki" Čaušević
- Runner-up: Franc Vozel
- Location: Kukeč, Slovenia

Release
- Original network: Planet TV
- Original release: August 30 – December 11, 2015

Season chronology
- ← Previous; Kmetija 2014 Next → Kmetija 2016

Kmetija: Nov začetek 2015 (The Farm: A New Beginning 2015) is the sixth season of the Slovene reality television series Kmetija and the second season of the Kmetija: Nov začetek edition to air on Planet TV. The season is filmed once again in Kukeč, Slovenia where 19 Slovenians compete on the Farm against each other to win the grand prize of €50,000. Saša Lendero returned as presenter for the series, leading discussions during nominations and hosting duels. The main twist this season is that amongst the contestants are two couples, (Maja Martinec & Niko Žižek) and (Fahrudin "Faki" Čaušević and Maruša Kraševec) all fighting to win but also trying to hide their relationship from the others. In addition, three contestants joined the farm after the first day. The season premiered on 30 August 2015 and concluded with a live finale on 11 December 2015 where Fahrudin "Faki" Čaušević won in the final duel against Franc Vozel to win the grand prize and win the title.

== Contestants ==
Contestant	Age on entry	Residence	Entered	Exited	Status	Finish
Kaja Rožič	20	Dob	Day 4	Day 9	1st Evicted; Day 9	19th
Gregor Češarek	28	Radenci	Day 1	Day 14	2nd Evicted; Day 14	18th
Borut Petkovšek	28	Logatec	Day 4	Day 21	3rd Evicted; Day 21	17th
Bojan Knehtl	55	Gorica pri Slivnici	Day 1	Day 28	4th Evicted; 1st Jury Member; Day 28	16th
Slavica Beribak	28	Selca	Day 1	Day 35	5th Evicted; Day 35	15th
Špela Hojnik	23	Polenšak	Day 1	Day 37	Quit; Day 37	14th
Barbara Brinar	24	Prebold	Day 4	Day 42	6th Evicted; Day 42	13th
Sebastjan Studenčnik	32	Zreče	Day 1	Day 49	7th Evicted; Day 49	12th
Anita Grobelnik	28	Slovenj Gradec	Day 1	Day 56	8th Evicted; 2nd Jury Member; Day 56	11th
Maruša Kraševec	32	Ljubljana	Day 1	Day 63	9th Evicted; 3rd Jury Member; Day 63	10th
Maja Martinec	19	Murska Sobota	Day 1	Day 70	10th Evicted; 4th Jury Member; Day 70	9th
Barbara Imperl	26	Ljubljana	Day 1	Day 77	11th Evicted; 5th Jury Member; Day 77	8th
Jacqueline Steržaj	52	Ljutomer	Day 1	Day 83	12th Evicted; Day 83	7th
Dominika Šajtegel	42	Ptuj	Day 1	Day 86	13th Evicted; Day 86	6th
Niko Žižek	19	Beltinci	Day 1	Day 88	14th Evicted; 6th Jury Member; Day 88	5th
Bruno Lebar	19	Notranje Gorice	Day 1	Day 90	15th Evicted; Day 90	4th
Miha Markič Anzelin	24	Dobrovo	Day 1	Day 90	16th Evicted; Day 90	3rd
Franc Vozel	53	Trbovlje	Day 1	Day 90	Runner-up; Day 90	2nd
Fahrudin "Faki" Čaušević	33	Ljubljana	Day 1	Day 90	Winner; Day 90	1st

== The game ==
Week	Head of Farm	Butlers	1st Dueler	2nd Dueler	Evicted	Finish
1	Franc; Gregor (Note: From week 1-5, the farm were divided into two families, each having their own head of farm, butlers and duelists.)	Anita; Špela	~~Anita~~; Špela (Note: Franc's family won the weekly task. As a result, Anita and Barbara B. were immune from the duel.)	~~Barbara B.~~; Kaja	Kaja	1st Evicted; Day 9
2	Bruno; Faki	Anita; Gregor	~~Anita~~; Gregor (Note: Faki's family won the weekly task. As a result, Anita and Slavica were immune from the duel.)	Bojan; ~~Slavica~~	Gregor	2nd Evicted; Day 14
3	Faki; Maja	Borut; Bruno	Borut; ~~Bruno~~ (Note: Maja's family won the weekly task. As a result, Bruno and Miha were immune from the duel.)	~~Miha~~; Sebastjan	Borut	3rd Evicted; Day 21
4	Franc; Maja	Bojan; Sebastjan	~~Barbara I.~~; Bojan (Note: Franc's family won the weekly task. As a result Barbara I. and Maruša were immune from the duel.)	~~Maruša~~; Miha	Bojan	4th Evicted; Day 28
5	Anita; Jacqueline	Slavica; Špela	~~Špela~~; Slavica (Note: Jacqueline's family won the weekly task. As a result, Špela and Dominika were immune from the duel.)	Barbara I. ~~Dominika~~	Slavica	5th Evicted; Day 35
6 (Note: Starting from week 6, the two teams merged into one; now only having one head of the farm.)	Jacqueline	Barbara B. Sebastjan	Barbara B.	Dominika	Špela	Quit; Day 37
6	Jacqueline	Barbara B. Sebastjan	Barbara B.	Dominika	Barbara B.	6th Evicted; Day 42
7	Franc	Maja; Sebastjan	Sebastjan	Faki	Sebastjan	7th Evicted; Day 49
8	Miha	Dominika; Niko	Dominika	Anita	Anita	8th Evicted; Day 56
9	Franc	Bruno; Jacqueline	Jacqueline	Maruša	Maruša	9th Evicted; Day 63
10	Franc	Jacqueline; Niko	Jacqueline	Maja	Maja	10th Evicted; Day 70
11	Franc	Dominika; Niko	Dominika	Barbara I.	Barbara I.	11th Evicted; Day 77
12	Niko	Jacqueline; Faki	Jacqueline	Franc	Jacqueline	12th Evicted; Day 83
13	Franc	Dominika; Niko	Dominika	Faki	Dominika	13th Evicted; Day 86
14	Franc	None	Niko	Bruno	Niko	14th Evicted; Day 88
15	Jury (Note: The Jury (consisting of eliminated contestants) voted amongst themselves to vote one of the final four to be eliminated from the game. After voting, the votes were tied. Three (Barbara I., Maja and Niko) voted against Faki, the other three (Anita, Bojan and Maruša) voted against Bruno. To break the tie, Faki and Bruno competed in a duel.); Public (Note: For the Final Three, the Public were allowed to cast votes and to eliminate one of the contestants. The public voted to eliminate Miha.)	None	Bruno	Faki	Bruno	15th Evicted; Day 90
15	Jury; Public	None	All		Miha	16th Evicted; Day 90
15	Jury; Public	None	Faki	Franc	Franc	Runner-up; Day 90
15	Jury; Public	None	Faki	Franc	Faki	Winner; Day 90
