= Kmetija 2021 =

- Season 11
- Presented by: Natalija Bratkovič
- No. of days: 75
- No. of castaways: 20
- Winner: Tilen Brglez
- Runners-up: Karin Lipovnik; Nina Radi
- Location: Vučja Gomila, Slovenia

Release
- Original network: Pop TV
- Original release: September 6 – December 20, 2021

Season chronology
- ← Previous; Kmetija 2019 Next → Kmetija 2022

Kmetija 2021 (The Farm 2021) is the eleventh season of the Slovene reality television series Kmetija. After a year of hiatus due to the COVID-19 pandemic, the show returns with 16 contestants competing against each other to win €50,000. Presented by Natalija Bratkovič, the contestants live on a Farm like it was a century ago, completing tasks for the Farm Mentor, Nada Zorec, who'll judge & determine whether the contestants get a weekly prize or not. Each week the Head of the Farm chooses two butlers where the rest of the contestants later decide who the first duelist is. The duelist selects who they face against to compete in the duel. Whoever loses the duel is eliminated from the game but before they go, they write a letter stating who they have decided the Head of the Farm will be for the upcoming week. The season premiered on 6 September 2021 on Pop TV.

== Contestants ==
Among the contestants is 2015 finalist Franc Vozel and Sanjski moški 2021 contestants Nina Radi and Polona Kranjc.

Contestant	Age on entry	Residence	Entered	Exited	Status	Finish
Dominik Visočnik	25	Spodnje Hoče	Day 1	Day 5	Ejected; Day 5	20th
Nika Bečlić	20	Maribor	Day 1	Day 5	Left Competition; Day 5	19th
Stanka Tokić	60	Maribor	Day 1	Day 10	1st Evicted; Day 10	18th
Jan Knez	56	Maribor	Day 2	Day 15	2nd Evicted; Day 15	17th
Maria Arko	57	Ribnica	Day 2	Day 20	3rd Evicted; Day 20	16th
Ambrož Vahen Kralj	29	Šentjur	Day 2	Day 25	4th Evicted; Day 25	15th
Anže Ipavic	29	Maribor	Day 2	Day 30	5th Evicted; Day 30	14th
Mattia Rutar	20	Koper	Day 10	Day 40	7th Evicted; Day 40	13th
Lina Majcen	20	Moste	Day 1	Day 45	8th Evicted; Day 45	12th
Aljaž Pušnik	21	Trzin	Day 1	Day 45	Left Competition; Day 45	11th
Tadej "Jetski" Kolar	31	Ljubljana	Day 10	Day 50	9th Evicted; Day 50	10th
Majda Candir	59	Gorica pri Slivnici	Day 2	Day 55	10th Evicted; Day 55	9th
Gino Tadej Podgornik	22	Tolmin	Day 1	Day 60	11th Evicted; 1st Jury Member; Day 60	8th
Franc Vozel	59	Trbovlje	Day 1	Day 65	12th Evicted; 2nd Jury Member; Day 65	7th
Romana Lavrič	20	Vrtače	Day 2	Day 70	13th Evicted; Day 70	6th
Polona Kranjc	19	Dol pri Ljubljani	Day 10	Day 35	6th Evicted; Day 35	5th
Polona Kranjc	19	Dol pri Ljubljani	Day 45	Day 70	14th Evicted; Day 70	5th
Tjaša Vrečič	23	Murska Sobota	Day 1	Day 73	15th Evicted; Day 73	4th
Nina Radi	32	Maribor	Day 10	Day 75	2nd Runner-up; Day 75	3rd
Karin Lipovnik	25	Dravograd	Day 2	Day 75	Runner-up; Day 75	2nd
Tilen Brglez	23	Rogaška Slatina	Day 1	Day 75	Winner; Day 75	1st

== The game ==
Week	Head of Farm	1st Dueler	2nd Dueler	Evicted	Finish
1	Franc	Dominik	Jan	Dominik	Ejected; Day 5
1	Franc	Dominik	Jan	Nika	Left Competition; Day 5
1	Franc	Jan	Aljaž	Jan	Won Head of Farm; Day 6 (Note: As Dominik was ejected before the duel, no elimination took place. Instead, Jan was given an option to choose his opponent to become the new Head of the Farm. He chose Aljaž.)
2	Jan	Maria	Stanka	Stanka	1st Evicted; Day 10
3	Maria	Jan	Ambrož	Jan	2nd Evicted; Day 15 (Note: After being evicted, the evicted contestants (Jan, Maria, Ambrož, Anže, Polona and Mattia) were taken to a hut in the woods to await further instructions to have a chance to compete and return to the farm. On Day 45, the contestants on the farm voted for which contestant they wanted back on the farm. They voted for Polona)
4	Nina	Maria	Romana	Maria	3rd Evicted; Day 20
5	Tilen	Ambrož	Mattia	Ambrož	4th Evicted; Day 25
6	Franc	Aljaž	Anže	Anže	5th Evicted; Day 30
7	Franc	Polona	Romana	Polona	6th Evicted; Day 35
8	~~Majda~~; Tadej (Note: For this week, two heads of the farm were chosen. The farm would be split into two teams led by one of the heads. The team that wins has their leader be the head of the farm for the week. As Tadej's team won, he remained the head of the farm.)	Mattia	Aljaž	Mattia	7th Evicted; Day 40
9	Tadej	Lina	Karin	Lina	8th Evicted; Day 45
9	Tadej	Lina	Karin	Aljaž	Left Competition; Day 45
10	Polona	Nina {Franc}	Tadej {Gino} (Note: Nina and Tadej were allowed to choose one housemate to help them in the duel. The two chosen won't be eliminated if they lost. Nina chose Franc and Tadej chose Gino.)	Tadej	9th Evicted; Day 50
11	Polona	Majda	Tjaša	Majda	10th Evicted; Day 55
12	Karin	Gino	Tjaša	Gino	11th Evicted; 1st Jury Member; Day 60
13	Tjaša	Tilen	Franc	Franc	12th Evicted; 2nd Jury Member; Day 65
14	Jury	Romana; Tilen; Tjaša	Karin; Nina; Polona	Romana	13th Evicted; Day 70
14	Jury	Romana; Tilen; Tjaša	Karin; Nina; Polona	Polona	14th Evicted; Day 70
15	Semi Final			Tjaša	15th Evicted; Day 73
Final Duel				Nina	2nd Runner-up; Day 75
Final Duel				Karin	Runner-up; Day 75
Final Duel				Tilen	Winner; Day 75
