= Kmetija 2019 =

- Season 10
- Presented by: Natalija Bratkovič
- No. of days: 70
- No. of castaways: 19
- Winners: Jan Klobasa & Tilen Klobasa
- Runner-up: Luka Lampret
- Location: Vučja Gomila, Slovenia

Release
- Original network: Pop TV
- Original release: September 16 – December 21, 2019

Season chronology
- ← Previous; Kmetija 2018 Next → Kmetija 2021

Kmetija 2019 (The Farm 2019) is the tenth season of the Slovene version of The Farm, a reality television show based on the Swedish television series of the similar name. This season 19 ordinary people from across Slovenia will live on the farm, trying to live life as it was 100 years ago and to try and win €50,000. This season's farm is located in Vučja Gomila. It is the largest farm to date with 7 buildings located within a 30 hectare radius of the farm. 6 of which were newly built. The main twist this season is that out of the 19 contestants, two of them are twins who will compete as one. When one becomes head of the farm, the other is as well. In addition, two contestants (Goran Leban & Jan Klobasa) are returnees of previous seasons of Kmetija.

== Finishing order ==
Amongst the contestants are, Sara Rutar, winner of MasterChef Slovenia 2017, Slovenija ima talent 2013 contestant Borut Gregorič, former Bar 2015 contestants Rene Šantić and Tanja Balabanić. In addition, two former Kmetija contestants return, Goran Leban from Kmetija 2008 and Jan Kloblasa from Kmetija 2017.

All contestants entered on Day 1.

| Contestant | Age on entry | Residence | Status | Finish |
|---|---|---|---|---|
| Ksenija Sešel † | 35 | Laško | 1st Evicted; Day 5 | 18th |
| Goran Leban | 65 | Kočevje | 2nd Evicted; Day 10 | 17th |
| Lucija Kolar Lipovšek | 18 | Loče | 3rd Evicted; Day 15 | 16th |
| Bojan Kermavner | 59 | Ljubljana | Quit; 1st Jury Member; Day 20 | 15th |
| Damjana Tomažin | 24 | Litija | 4th Evicted; Day 20 | 14th |
| Borut Gregorič | 30 | Koper | 5th Evicted; Day 25 | 13th |
| Simona Križnik | 38 | Ptuj | Left Due to Family Emergency; 2nd Jury Member; Day 30 | 12th |
| Božidara Vezjak | 57 | Slovenske Konjice | 6th Evicted; 3rd Jury Member; Day 35 | 11th |
| Denis Šajher Kovačič | 22 | Maribor | 7th Evicted; Day 40 | 10th |
| Danijel Frigelj | 38 | Veliki Obrež | 8th Evicted; 4th Jury Member; Day 45 | 9th |
| Tom Zupan | 21 | Kranj | 9th Evicted; Day 50 | 8th |
| Adrijana Štribl | 28 | Zgornja Ložnica | 10th Evicted; Day 55 | 7th |
| Tanja Balabanić | 34 | Vrhnika | 11th Evicted; 5th Jury Member; Day 60 | 6th |
| Sara Rutar | 29 | Izola | 12th Evicted; 6th Jury Member; Day 65 | 5th |
| Marjana Povše | 59 | Novo Mesto | 13th Evicted; Day 68 | 4th |
| Rene Šantić | 32 | Ljubljana | 14th Evicted; Day 69 | 3rd |
| Luka Lampret | 21 | Celje | Runner-Up; Day 70 | 2nd |
| Jan Klobasa | 21 | Gornja Radgona | Winners; Day 70 | 1st |
| Tilen Klobasa | 21 | Gornja Radgona | Winners; Day 70 | 1st |

== The game ==
| Week | Head of Farm | Butlers | 1st Dueler | 2nd Dueler | Evicted | Finish |
|---|---|---|---|---|---|---|
| 1 | Denis | Marjana; Jan & Tilen | Marjana | Ksenija | Ksenija | 1st Evicted; Day 5 |
| 2 | Marjana | Sara; Denis | Denis | Goran | Goran | 2nd Evicted; Day 10 |
| 3 | Tanja | Lucija; Luka | Lucija | Damjana | Lucija | 3rd Evicted; Day 15 |
| 4 | Borut | Tanja; Jan & Tilen | Damjana; Tanja | Bojan; Rene (Note: As Bojan and Rene were the last two contestants living in the woods, they had to compete in a duel against the duelists (Damjana and Tanja) for a place on the farm.) | Bojan (Note: Although Bojan and Rene won the duel, Bojan quit and gave his spot to Tanja.) | Quit; Day 20 |
| 4 | Borut | Tanja; Jan & Tilen | Damjana; Tanja | Bojan; Rene | Damjana | 4th Evicted; Day 20 |
| 5 | Tanja | Božidara; Borut | Borut | Danijel | Borut | 5th Evicted; Day 25 |
| 6 | Denis | Božidara; Jan & Tilen | Božidara | Simona | Simona | Left Due to Family Emergency; Day 30 |
| 7 | Tom | Marjana; Danijel | Marjana; Danijel | Božidara; Jan & Tilen | Božidara | 7th Evicted; Day 35 |
| 8 | Jan & Tilen | Adrijana; Denis | Denis | Luka | Denis | 8th Evicted; Day 40 |
| 9 | Luka | Tanja; Danijel | Danijel | Jan & Tilen | Danijel | 9th Evicted; Day 45 |
| 10 | Jan & Tilen | None | Tom | Rene | Tom | 10th Evicted; Day 50 |
| 11 | Rene | None | Sara | Adrijana | Adrijana | 11th Evicted; Day 55 |
| 12 | Luka | None | Sara | Tanja | Tanja | 12th Evicted; Day 60 |
| 13 | Jan & Tilen | None | Rene | Sara | Sara | 13th Evicted; Day 65 |
| 14 | Jury | None | Jan & Tilen | Marjana | Marjana | 14th Evicted; Day 68 |
| 14 | Jury | None | Luka | Rene | Rene | 15th Evicted; Day 69 |
| 14 | Jury | None | Jan & Tilen | Luka | Luka | Runner-Up; Day 70 |
| 14 | Jury | None | Jan & Tilen | Luka | Jan & Tilen | Winners; Day 70 |
