= Kmetija 2017 =

- Season 8
- Presented by: Natalija Bratkovič
- No. of days: 70
- No. of castaways: 18
- Winner: Milena Žižek
- Runner-up: Maja Alič
- Location: Mala Polana, Slovenia

Release
- Original network: Pop TV
- Original release: September 11 – December 22, 2017

Season chronology
- ← Previous; Kmetija 2016 Next → Kmetija 2018

Kmetija 2017 is the eighth season of the Slovenian reality television series Kmetija. This is the first season since Kmetija 2011 to air on Pop TV after three seasons aired on Planet TV. The show is hosted for the first time by Natalija Bratkovič, where she has eighteen Slovenes from all over Slovenia come to the farm to compete for €75,000 and the title of Kmetija 2017. The season premiered on 11 September 2017 and concluded on 22 December 2017 where Milena Žižek won in the final duel against Maja Alič to claim the €60,000 prize after the prize dropped due to failure in some tasks, in addition to being named the winner of Kmetija 2017.

== Contestants ==
Amongst the contestants are father Damijan Gjerkeš and his daughter Deja Gjerkeš.

Contestant	Age on entry	Residence	Entered	Exited	Status	Finish
Silvo Korošec	62	Velike Lašče	Day 1	Day 9	Medically Evacuated; Day 9	18th
Jan Klobasa	19	Gornja Radgona	Day 1	Day 11	2nd Evicted; Day 11	17th
Branko Koder	49	Lovrenc na Pohorju	Day 1	Day 16	3rd Evicted; Day 16	16th
Darja Tomažin	49	Šentrupert	Day 1	Day 21	4th Evicted; Day 21	15th
David Helbel	32	Josipdol	Day 1	Day 25	Ejected; Day 25	14th
Mirela Rajak	30	Novo Mesto	Day 1	Day 26	5th Evicted; Day 26	13th
Robi Laznik	42	Ljubljana	Day 1	Day 31	6th Evicted; Day 31	12th
Robi Laznik	42	Ljubljana	Day 31	Day 37	7th Evicted; Day 37	12th
Damijan Gjerkeš	43	Beltinci	Day 1	Day 41	8th Evicted; Day 41	11th
Sabina Mlakar	52	Grosuplje	Day 1	Day 46	9th Evicted; Day 46	10th
Tomaž Bogovič	26	Zdole	Day 1	Day 51	10th Evicted; Day 51	9th
Monika Košenina	28	Trbovlje	Day 1	Day 56	11th Evicted; Day 56	8th
Katja Poljanšek	24	Kamnik	Day 1	Day 61	12th Evicted; Day 61	7th
Boris Frangež	45	Rogatec	Day 1	Day 66	13th Evicted; Day 66	6th
Mitja Roban	18	Robanov Kot	Day 1	Day 68	14th Evicted; Day 68	5th
Deja Gjerkeš	21	Beltinci	Day 1	Day 68	15th Evicted; Day 68	4th
Tamara Klemen	27	Mengeš	Day 1	Day 7	1st Evicted; Day 7	3rd
Tamara Klemen	27	Mengeš	Day 31	Day 69	16th Evicted; Day 69	3rd
Maja Alič	23	Ljubljana	Day 1	Day 70	Runner-up; Day 70	2nd
Milena Žižek	44	Grabe pri Ljutomeru	Day 1	Day 70	Winner; Day 70	1st

== The game ==
Week	Head of Farm	1st Dueler	2nd Dueler	Evicted	Finish
1	Damijan; Darja	Tamara	Katja	Tamara	1st Evicted; Day 7
2	Damjan; Branko	Tomaž	Jan	Silvo	Medically Evacuated; Day 9
2	Damjan; Branko	Tomaž	Jan	Jan	2nd Evicted; Day 11
3	Damjan; Milena	Tomaž	Branko	Branko	3rd Evicted; Day 16
4	Damjan; Maja	Darja	Milena	Darja	4th Evicted; Day 21
5	Damjan; Tomaž	Monika	Mirela	David	Ejected; Day 25
5	Damjan; Tomaž	Monika	Mirela	Mirela	5th Evicted; Day 26
6	Damjan; Tomaž	Maja	Robi	Robi	6th Evicted; Day 31
6	Damjan; Tomaž	Robi; Jan; Branko	Mirela; Darja; Tamara	Robi	Returned to Game; Day 31
6	Damjan; Tomaž	Robi; Jan; Branko	Mirela; Darja; Tamara	Tamara	Returned to Game; Day 31
7	Sabina	Damijan	Robi	Robi	7th Evicted; Day 37
8	Katja	Damijan	Boris	Damijan	8th Evicted; Day 41
9	Deja	Sabina	Monika	Sabina	9th Evicted; Day 46
10	Boris	Tomaž	Mitja	Tomaž	10th Evicted; Day 51
11	Katja	Monika	Deja	Monika	11th Evicted; Day 56
12	Boris	Mitja	Katja	Katja	12th Evicted; Day 61
13	Maja	Boris	Deja	Boris	13th Evicted; Day 66
14	None	All	All	Mitja	14th Evicted; Day 69
14	None	All	All	Deja	15th Evicted; Day 69
14	None	All	All	Tamara	16th Evicted; Day 69
14	None	All	All	Maja	Runner-up; Day 70
14	None	All	All	Milena	Winner; Day 70
