= Kmetija: Nov začetek 2016 =

- Season 7
- Presented by: Jasna Kuljaj
- No. of days: 90
- No. of castaways: 19
- Winner: Adriana Košenina
- Runner-up: Zara Ilić
- Location: Zaplana, Slovenia

Release
- Original network: Planet TV
- Original release: September 1 – December 17, 2016

Season chronology
- ← Previous; Kmetija 2015 Next → Kmetija 2017

Kmetija: Nov začetek 2016 (The Farm: A New Beginning 2016) is the seventh season of the Slovene reality television series Kmetija and the third and final season of the Kmetija: Nov začetek edition to air on Planet TV. The season is filmed in Zaplana, Slovenia where 19 Slovenians compete on the Farm against each other to win the grand prize of €50,000. The season is hosted for the first and only time by Jasna Kuljaj. The season premiered on Planet TV on 1 September 2016 and concluded on 17 December 2016 where after 90 days, Adriana Košenina won in the final duel against Zara Ilić to win the grand prize and be crowned the winner of Kmetija: Nov začetek 2016.

== Contestants ==
Contestant	Age on entry	Residence	Entered	Exited	Status	Finish
Marjan Beranič	40	Maribor	Day 1	Day 4	1st Evicted; Day 4	19th
Lidija Požek	50	Šmarje pri Jelšah	Day 1	Day 12	2nd Evicted; Day 12	18th
Sanja Kovač	26	Lendava	Day 1	Day 16	Ejected; Day 16	17th
Samo Esih	48	Ponikva	Day 1	Day 18	3rd Evicted; Day 18	16th
Helena Kveder	22	Ljubljana	Day 1	Day 21	Medically Evacuated; Day 21	15th
Franc Lešnik	67	Jurovski Dol	Day 1	Day 25	4th Evicted; Day 25	14th
Anastazija Nastja Kočunik	24	Ožbalt	Day 1	Day 30	5th Evicted; Day 30	13th
Radmila "Rada" Krsmanović	57	Dolenjske Toplice	Day 31	Day 42	6th Evicted; Day 42	12th
Andrej Poljanšek	64	Radomlje	Day 1	Day 49	7th Evicted; Day 49	11th
Vid Gostenčnik	33	Mislinja	Day 1	Day 56	8th Evicted; Day 56	10th
Klavdija Lorbek	26	Celje	Day 1	Day 61	9th Evicted; Day 61	9th
Božo Ogorevc	42	Celje	Day 31	Day 63	10th Evicted; Day 63	8th
Senad Kasumović - Neno	39	Ljubljana	Day 1	Day 70	11th Evicted; Day 70	7th
Ganna Baznyk	49	Krško	Day 1	Day 77	12th Evicted; Day 77	6th
Tine Stropnik	26	Šmarje–Sap	Day 1	Day 84	13th Evicted; Day 84	5th
Matjaž Trobec	22	Ljubljana	Day 1	Day 90	15th Evicted; Day 90	4th
Matic Jošt	26	Novo Mesto	Day 1	Day 86	14th Evicted; Day 86	3rd
Matic Jošt	26	Novo Mesto	Day 88	Day 90	16th Evicted; Day 90	3rd
Zara Ilić	33	Kočevje	Day 31	Day 90	Runner-up; Day 90	2nd
Adriana Košenina	28	Jurklošter	Day 1	Day 90	Winner; Day 90	1st

== The game ==
Week	Head of Farm	Butlers	1st Dueler	2nd Dueler	Evicted	Finish
1	Samo	Marjan; Vid	Marjan	Senad	Marjan	1st Evicted; Day 4
2	Andrej	Helena; Klavdija	Helena	Lidija	Lidija	2nd Evicted; Day 12
3	Franc	Samo; Matic	Samo	Senad	Sanja	Ejected; Day 16
3	Franc	Samo; Matic	Samo	Senad	Samo	3rd Evicted; Day 18
4	Adriana	Franc; Matic	Franc	Senad	Helena	Medically Evacuated; Day 21
4	Adriana	Franc; Matic	Franc	Senad	Franc	4th Evicted; Day 25
5	Ganna	Rada; Zara	Rada	Anastazija	Anastazija	5th Evicted; Day 30
6	None (Note: For Week 6, as new contestants, Božo, Rada and Zara all competed in a duel to see who would become a butler and an automatic duelist for the next week. Rada lost and became a butler and a duelist for week 7.)	None	Božo; Zara	Rada	Rada	Lost Duel; Week 7 Duelist; Day 37
7	Tine	Ganna; Rada	Rada; Ganna	Božo	Rada	6th Evicted; Day 42
8	Božo	Adriana; Tine	Adriana	Andrej	Andrej	7th Evicted; Day 49
9	Tine	Adriana	Adriana	Vid	Vid	8th Evicted; Day 56
10 (Note: For Week 10, both butlers were immediately made duelists as a twist. Božo and Zara competed in a duel to see who could have their elimination duel first and to stay on the farm for an additional two days. Božo won the duel amongst the butlers.)	Adriana	Božo; Zara	Klavdija	Zara	Klavdija	9th Evicted; Day 61
10	Adriana	Božo; Zara	Božo	Matjaž	Božo	10th Evicted; Day 63
11	Matic	Matjaž; Tine	Tine	Senad	Senad	11th Evicted; Day 70
12	Zara	Adriana; Matjaž	Matjaž	Ganna	Ganna	12th Evicted; Day 77
13	Zara	Adriana; Matic	Matic	Tine	Tine	13th Evicted; Day 84
14	Zara	None	Matic	Adriana	Matic	14th Evicted; Day 86
15	Jury (Note: The Jury (consisting of eliminated contestants) voted amongst themselves to vote one of their own back into the game and be eligible for the prize. The jury voted to put Matic back into the game.); Public (Note: For the Final Four, the Public were allowed to cast votes and to eliminate one of the contestants. The public voted to eliminate Matjaž.)	None	All	All	Matjaž	15th Evicted; Day 90
15	Jury; Public	None	Adriana; Matic	Zara	Matic	16th Evicted; Day 90
15	Jury; Public	None	Adriana	Zara	Zara	Runner-up; Day 90
15	Jury; Public	None	Adriana	Zara	Adriana	Winner; Day 90
