= Kmetija season 1 =

Kmetija (2007) was the inaugural season of the Slovene reality television series Kmetija ("Farm"), based on the Swedish franchise Farmen produced by Strix. The season premiered on October 2, 2007 on POP TV, with episodes airing five days a week, Tuesday through Saturday. The season was hosted by radio and television presenter Špela Močnik. A companion hub, hosted on news programme 24UR's website, was regularly updated throughout the season with cast video diaries, audience surveys and discussion forums.

In Farm, a group of 12 contestants live and work together on the titular farm, cut off from modern technology and conveniences. Each week they compete in challenges and duels until one remains to win a cash prize of €50,000.

Two contestants departed the competition outside the normal elimination process. Dejan in the second week for medical reasons, and Simon by a contestant vote after breaking quarantine rules. The week following Simon's removal, contestant Špela Sotlar was medically evacuated after being struck by lightning, later returning to the competition.

In the live finale, 21-year-old contestant Daša Hliš defeated Bilijana two duels to one, claiming the cash prize and becoming the first female winner in the history of Slovenian reality television.

== Contestants ==
| Contestant | Home | Occupation | Age |
|---|---|---|---|
| Adrijana | Goriška Brda | | 32 |
| Biljana Kuzmanovič | Ljubljana | | 24 |
| Daša Hliš | Celje | | 21 |
| Dejan | Zgornja Polskava | | 38 |
| Jurij | Maribor | | 26 |
| Katja | Kočevje | | 32 |
| Klemen | Ponikva, Šentjur | | 24 |
| Ljubinka Pančič | Ljubljana | | 23 |
| Magda Grošelj | Domžale | | 63 |
| Matija | Šempeter v Savinjski Dolini | | 33 |
| Michael | Trbovlje | | 32 |
| Nina | Vojnik | | 23 |
| Simon | Portorož | | 27 |
| Špela Sotlar | Polhov Gradec | | 39 |
| Vinko Koprić | Ruše | | 47 |

== Nominations ==
| | Week 1 | Week 2 | Week 3 | Week 4 | Week 5 | Week 6 | Vote to Return | Week 7 | Week 8 | Week 9 | Week 10 | Semi Final | Final |
|---|---|---|---|---|---|---|---|---|---|---|---|---|---|
| Farm Leader (Immunity) | Dejan | Matija | Michael | Jurij | Jurij | Špela | None | Daša | Biljana | Ljubinka | None | Biljana | None |
| Leader Nominations | Katja; Matija | Magda; Michael | Matija; Špela | Klemen; Špela | Ljubinka; Nina | Adrijana; Jurij | None | NoneKlemen; Špela | Klemen; Špela | Biljana; Michael | None | None | None |
| Daša | Katja | Magda | Matija | Klemen | Ljubinka | Jurij | Michael | Špela | Špela | Michael | Nominated | Nominated | Winner (Day 75) |
| Biljana | Katja | Magda | Matija | Klemen | Ljubinka | Jurij | Michael | Klemen | Immune | Nominated | Nominated | Immune | Runner-Up (Day 75) |
| Ljubinka | Not in The Farm | | | | Nominated | Jurij | Michael | Špela | Klemen | Immune | Nominated | Nominated | Evicted (Day 68) |
| Klemen | Katja | Magda | Špela | Nominated | Ljubinka | Adrijana | Michael | Nominated | Nominated | Michael | Nominated | Evicted (Day 67) | Winner (Public vote) |
| Michael | Katja | Nominated | Immune | Špela | Evicted (Day 26) | | Nominated; For Return | Špela | Špela | Nominated | Re-Evicted (Day 61) | | |
| Špela | Katja | Magda | Nominated | Nominated | Ljubinka | Immune | Michael | Nominated | Nominated | Evicted (Day 54) | | | |
| Adrijana | Matija | Magda | Matija | Klemen | Ljubinka | Nominated | Michael | Klemen | Evicted (Day 47) | | | | |
| Simon | Katja | Magda | Matija | Klemen | Ljubinka | Adrijana | Walked (Day 43) | | | | | | |
| Jurij | Katja | Magda | Špela | Immune | Ljubinka | Nominated | Nominated; For Return | Re-Evicted (Day 44) | | | | | |
| Nina | Not in The Farm | | | | Nominated | Evicted (Day 33) | | | | | | | |
| Vinko | Not in The Farm | | | | Evicted (Day 31) | | Nominated; For Return | Re-Evicted (Day 44) | | | | | |
| Matija | Nominated | Immune | Nominated | Evicted (Day 19) | | | Nominated; For Return | Re-Evicted (Day 44) | | | | | |
| Magda | Katja | Nominated | Evicted (Day 12) | | | | | | | | | | |
| Dejan | Immune | Walked (Day 8) | | | | | | | | | | | |
| Katja | Nominated | Evicted (Day 5) | | | | | | | | | | | |
| Walked | None | Dejan | None | | | | Simon | None | | | | | |
| 1st Nominated (By Group) | Katja; 8/9 votes | Magda; 7/7 votes | Matija; 4/6 votes | Klemen; 4/5 votes | Nina; 0/7 votes | Jurij; 3/5 votes | None | Špela; 3/5 votes | Špela; 2/3 votes | Michael; 2/2 votes | None | None | None |
| 2nd Nominated (by 1st Nominated) | Špela | Daša | Klemen | Michael | Adrijana | Simon | None | Adrijana | Daša | Klemen | None | None | None |
| Evicted | Katja; Lost duel | Magda; Lost duel | Matija; Lost duel | Michael; Lost duel | Nina; Lost duel | Jurij; Lost duel | Jurij; Michael; Vinko; 0 votes to return | Adrijana; Lost duel | Špela; Lost duel | Michael; Lost duel | Klemen; 5/9 votes (by ex-contestants) | Ljubinka; Lost duel | Biljana lose final duel |
| Evicted | Katja; Lost duel | Magda; Lost duel | Matija; Lost duel | Michael; Lost duel | Nina; Lost duel | Jurij; Lost duel | Jurij; Michael; Vinko; 0 votes to return | Adrijana; Lost duel | Špela; Lost duel | Michael; Lost duel | Klemen; 5/9 votes (by ex-contestants) | Ljubinka; Lost duel | Daša won final duel |
| Evicted | Katja; Lost duel | Magda; Lost duel | Matija; Lost duel | Vinko by Leader | Nina; Lost duel | Jurij; Lost duel | Jurij; Michael; Vinko; 0 votes to return | Adrijana; Lost duel | Špela; Lost duel | Michael; Lost duel | Klemen; 5/9 votes (by ex-contestants) | Ljubinka; Lost duel | |
| Evicted | Katja; Lost duel | Magda; Lost duel | Matija; Lost duel | Vinko by Leader | Nina; Lost duel | Jurij; Lost duel | Jurij; Michael; Vinko; 0 votes to return | Adrijana; Lost duel | Špela; Lost duel | Michael; Lost duel | Klemen; 5/9 votes (by ex-contestants) | Ljubinka; Lost duel | Klemen; 84% (Public vote) |
