= Slivnica pri Celju =

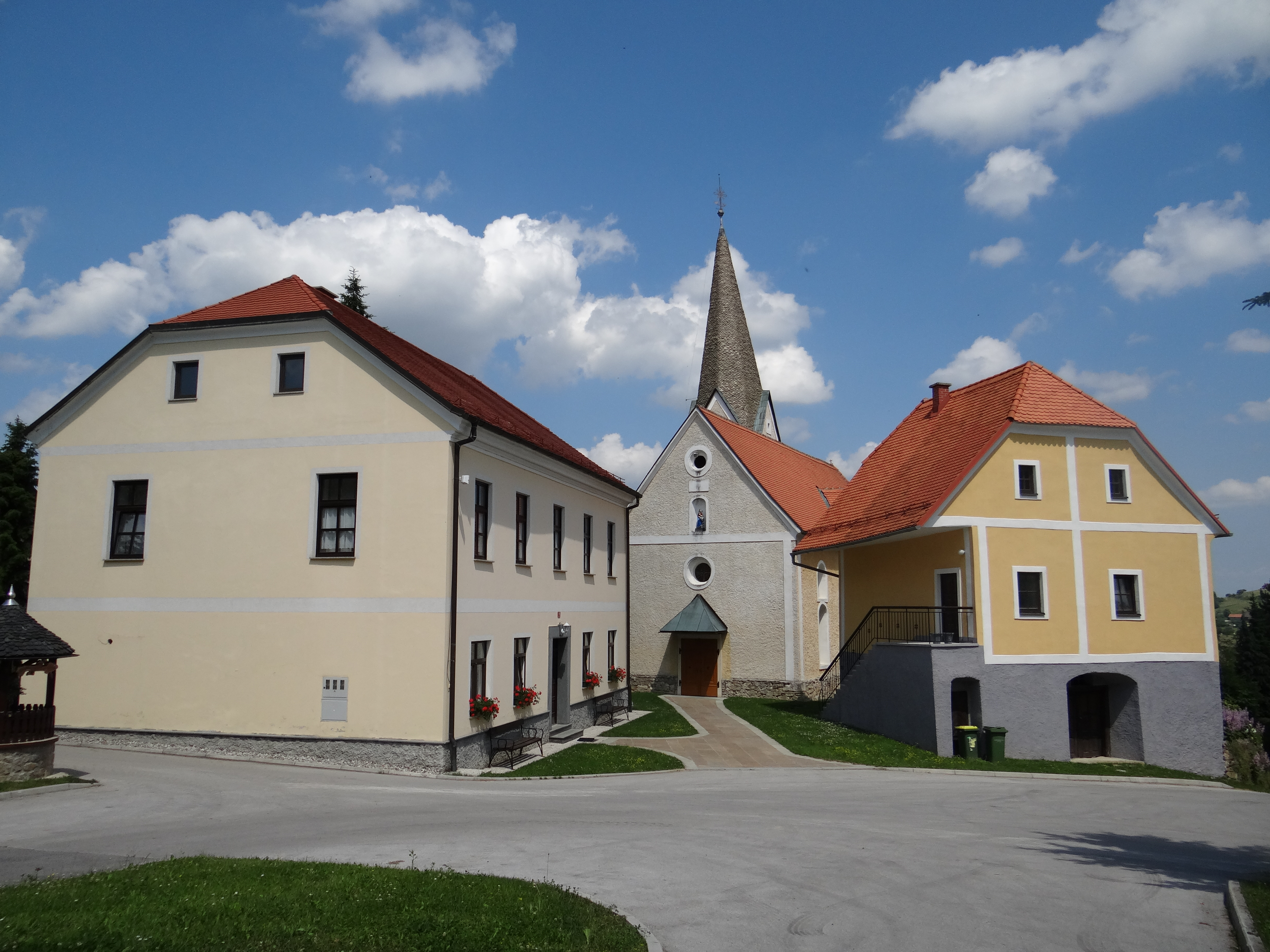

- Location in Slovenia
- Coordinates: 46°10′26.78″N 15°25′38.17″E
- Country: Slovenia
- Traditional region: Styria
- Statistical region: Savinja
- Municipality: Šentjur

Area
  - Total: 1.07 km^{2} (0.41 sq mi)
- Elevation: 480 m (1,570 ft)

Population (2020)
  - Total: 111
  - Density: 104/km^{2} (269/sq mi)

Slivnica pri Celju (pronounced [ˈslíːwnitsa pɾi ˈtsɛ̀ːlju]) is a settlement in the Municipality of Šentjur, eastern Slovenia. The settlement, and the entire municipality, are included in the Savinja Statistical Region, which is in the Slovenian portion of the historical Duchy of Styria.

There are two churches in the settlement. The parish church is dedicated to Mary Magdalene and belongs to the Roman Catholic Diocese of Celje. Of the original 16th-century church only the belfry remains. The rest of the building dates to the early 18th century. A second church, south of the settlement core, is dedicated to John the Baptist and dates to the late 17th century.
