= Jure Godler =

Jure Godler (born 24 March 1984) is a Slovenian writer, actor, composer and comedian. He is best known for his impressions on the Slovenian National Television programme Hri-Bar. He has also performed in America at The Improv in Los Angeles.
