= Premagovce =

- Location in Slovenia
- Coordinates: 45°50′6.32″N 15°31′47.37″E
- Country: Slovenia
- Traditional region: Lower Carniola
- Statistical region: Lower Sava
- Municipality: Krško

Area
  - Total: 3.58 km^{2} (1.38 sq mi)
- Elevation: 477.9 m (1,568 ft)

Population (2002)
  - Total: 24
- Postal code: 8312

Premagovce (pronounced [pɾɛmaˈɡoːu̯tsɛ]) is a settlement in the Gorjanci Mountains in the Municipality of Krško in eastern Slovenia, right on the border with Croatia. The area is part of the traditional region of Lower Carniola. It is now included in the Lower Sava Statistical Region.
