= Survivor Slovenija: Filipini =

- Presented by: Miran Stanovnik
- No. of days: 42
- No. of castaways: 18
- Winner: Alen Perklič
- Runners-up: Sandi Sinanović; Maja Pirc
- Location: Caramoan, Philippines

Release
- Original network: POP TV
- Original release: August 31 – December 2, 2016

Survivor Slovenija: Filipini is the first and only season of the Slovene version of the international reality game show of Survivor. The season was filmed in the Philippines and presented by Miran Stanovnik with the series airing on POP TV from 31 August 2016 to 2 December 2016. After 42 Days, it was Alen Perklič who won in an 8-2-0 jury vote against Sandi Sinanović and Maja Pirc to become the Sole Survivor and win €50,000.

== Finishing order ==
Contestant	Original Tribe	Swapped Tribe	Merged Tribe	Status	Redemption Island
Lidija Zver; 43, Nedelica	Sambal			1st Voted Out; Day 3	
Klemen Rutar; 28, Ljubljana; Survivor Srbija: Philippines	Sambal			2nd Voted Out; Day 6	
Alan Duraković; 32, Ljubljana	Tala			3rd Voted Out; Day 9	
Renato Mikša; 30, Maribor	Tala			4th Voted Out; Day 12	
Brina Skornšek; 31, Šoštanj	Tala	Sambal		5th Voted Out; Day 15	
Katja Sešel; 23, Velenje	Sambal	Tala		6th Voted Out; Day 18	
Aneta Andollini; 30, Ljubljana	Tala	Sambal		7th Voted Out; Day 21	
Sara Dolžan; 29, Ljubljana	Sambal	Tala		Lost Challenge; Day 22	Lost Challenge; 1st jury member Day 24
Luka Pašič; 28, Ljubljana	Sambal	Sambal	Mansaka	8th Voted Out; Day 24	Lost Challenge; 2nd jury member Day 27
Teja Pangerc; 25, Mošnje	Sambal	Tala		Lost Challenge; Day 22	Lost Challenge; 3rd jury member Day 30
Franko Bajc; 20, Ajdovščina	Sambal	Sambal	Mansaka	9th Voted Out; Day 27	Lost Challenge; 4th jury member Day 33
Grega Boštic; 38, Ljubljana	Sambal	Tala	Mansaka	10th Voted Out; Day 30	Lost Challenge; 5th jury member Day 36
Simona Potočar; 32, Brežice	Tala	Sambal		Lost Challenge; Day 22	Lost Challenge; 6th jury member Day 39
Ines Vidmar; 22, Kamnik	Sambal	Tala	Mansaka	12th Voted Out; Day 36	Lost Challenge; 7th jury member Day 39
Alen Perklič; Returned to Game	Sambal	Tala	Mansaka	11th Voted Out; Day 33	Won Challenge; Day 39
Klemen Alič; 23, Pevno	Tala	Tala	Mansaka	13th Voted Out; 8th jury member Day 39	
Teja Kralj; 37, Škofja Loka; Survivor Srbija: Philippines	Tala	Tala	Mansaka	Lost Challenge; 9th jury member Day 41	
Jurij Blatnik; 50, Spodnja Polskava	Tala	Sambal	Mansaka	Lost Challenge; 10th jury member Day 41	
Maja Pirc; 26, Kranj	Tala	Sambal	Mansaka	2nd-Runner-Up; Day 42	
Sandi Sinanović; 28, Celje	Tala	Sambal	Mansaka	Runner-Up; Day 42	
Alen Perklič; 24, Malahorna	Sambal	Tala	Mansaka	Sole Survivor; Day 42	
