= Gorica pri Slivnici =

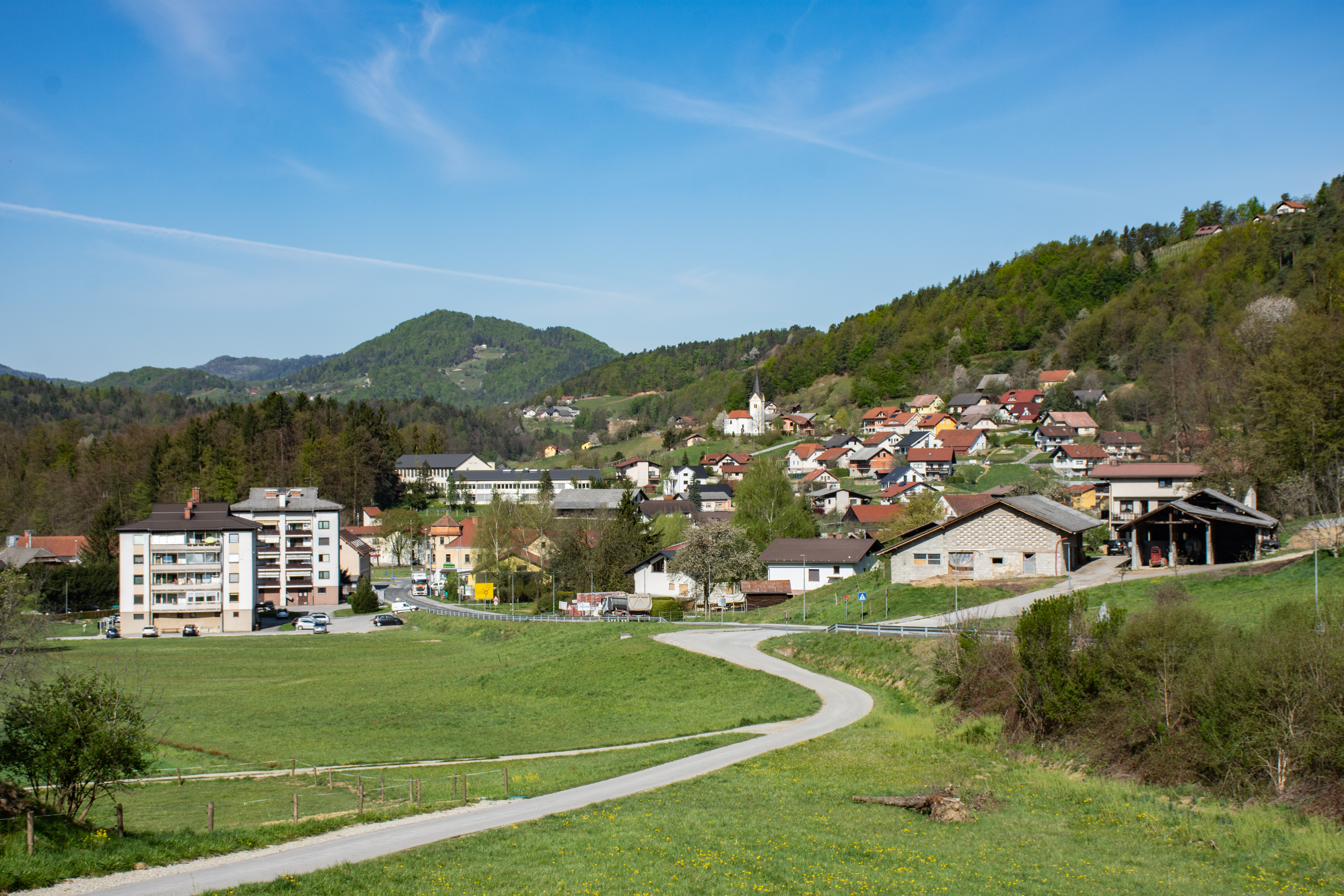

- Location in Slovenia
- Coordinates: 46°11′28.56″N 15°25′59.64″E
- Country: Slovenia
- Traditional region: Styria
- Statistical region: Savinja
- Municipality: Šentjur

Area
  - Total: 2.08 km^{2} (0.80 sq mi)
- Elevation: 360.4 m (1,182 ft)

Population (2020)
  - Total: 541
  - Density: 260/km^{2} (674/sq mi)

Gorica pri Slivnici (pronounced [ɡɔˈɾiːtsa pɾi ˈsliːu̯nitsi]) is a village, and one of the most populous settlements in the Municipality of Šentjur, in eastern Slovenia. The settlement, and the municipality, are included in the Savinja Statistical Region, which is in the Slovenian portion of the historical Duchy of Styria.

== Name ==
The name of the settlement was changed from Gorica to Gorica pri Slivnici in 1953.

== Church ==
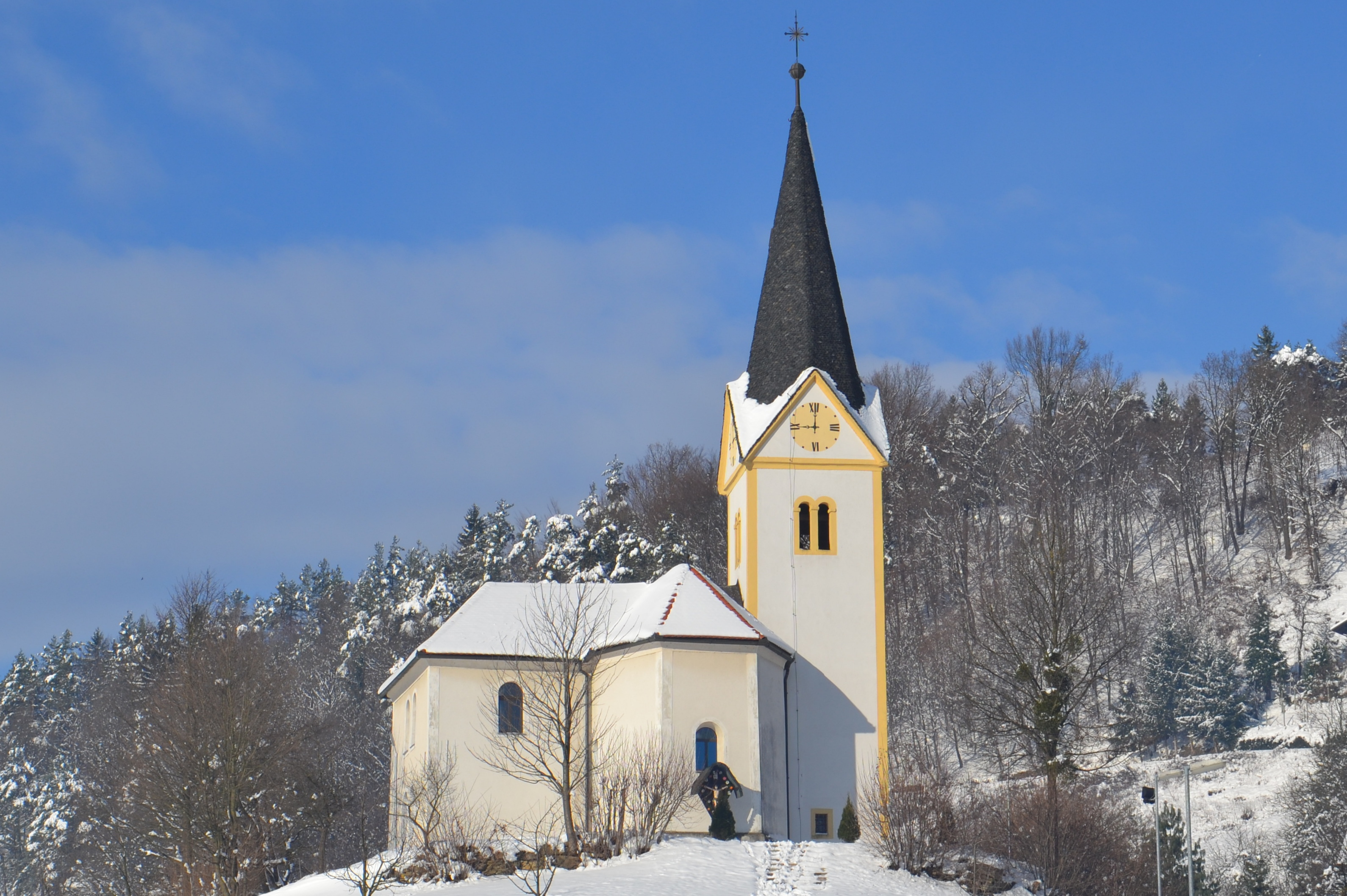
St. Urban's Church

The local church is dedicated to Saint Urban and belongs to the Parish of Slivnica pri Celju. It dates to the early 17th century and was consecrated in 1621. In the 19th century it was partially rebuilt and vaulted.
