= Zdole, Krško =

Zdole
- Location in Slovenia
- Coordinates: 45°58′33.04″N 15°32′34.49″E
- Country: Slovenia
- Traditional region: Styria
- Statistical region: Lower Sava
- Municipality: Krško

Area
  - Total: 3.77 km^{2} (1.46 sq mi)
- Elevation: 310.9 m (1,020 ft)

Population (2002)
  - Total: 255
- Postal code: 8272

Zdole (pronounced [ˈzdoːlɛ], German: Sdole) is a settlement in the Municipality of Krško in eastern Slovenia. The area is part of the traditional region of Styria. It is now included with the rest of the municipality in the Lower Sava Statistical Region.

The parish church in the western part of the village is dedicated to Saint George (Slovene: sveti Jurij) and belongs to the Roman Catholic Diocese of Celje. It was built in the 17th century and rebuilt in 1875 in a Neo-Romanesque style.
