= Rova, Domžale =

Rova
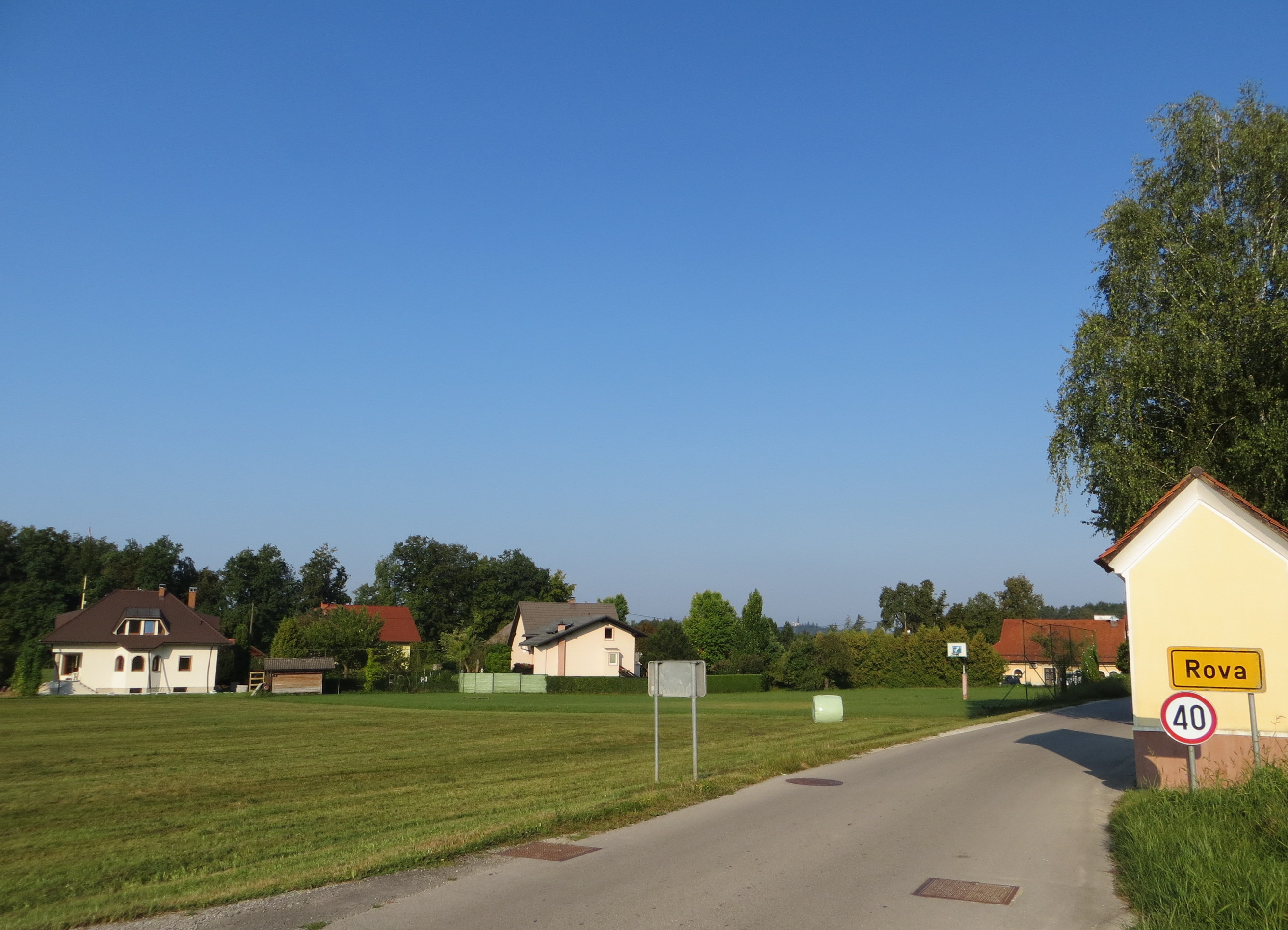

- Location in Slovenia
- Coordinates: 46°10′50.23″N 14°37′53.82″E
- Country: Slovenia
- Traditional region: Upper Carniola
- Statistical region: Central Slovenia
- Municipality: Domžale

Area
  - Total: 1.29 km^{2} (0.50 sq mi)
- Elevation: 338.3 m (1,110 ft)

Population (2020)
  - Total: 501
  - Density: 388/km^{2} (1,010/sq mi)

Rova (pronounced [ˈɾɔːʋa]; German: Rau) is a village east of Radomlje in the Municipality of Domžale in the Upper Carniola region of Slovenia.

== Church ==
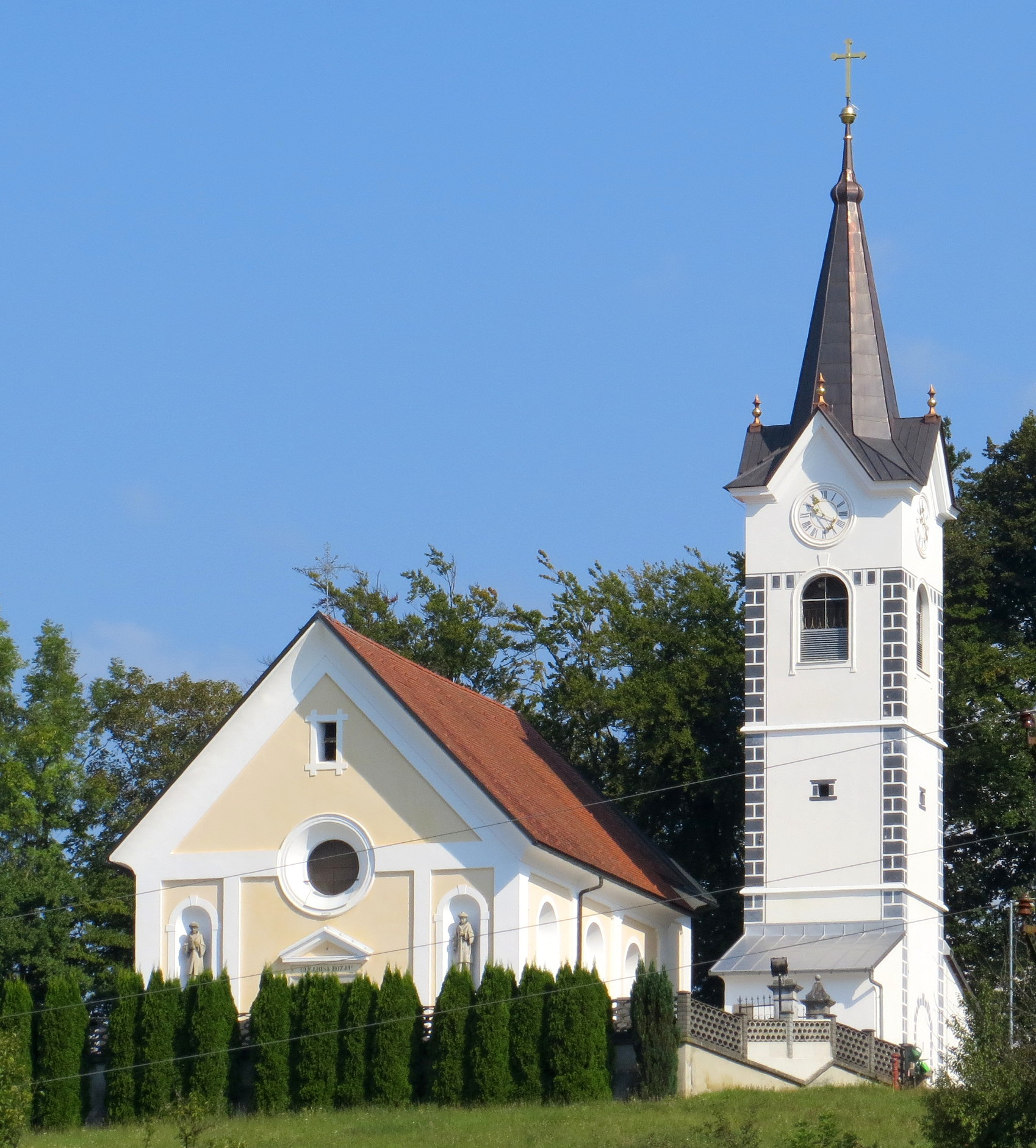
Saint Catherine's Church

The local parish church is built on a small hill north of the settlement and is dedicated to Saint Catherine of Alexandria.
