= Kmetija season 3 =

Kmetija Slavnih ("Farm of Celebrities") was the third season of the Slovene reality show Kmetija ("Farm") based on Swedish franchise Farmen produced by Strix. The show launched on September 28, 2009, with introducing of 10 celebrities who will compete for a grand prize 50,000 EUR. Letter in the series 4 new contestants enter the farm. The show ended on December 7, 2009, with Goran Breščanski won over Artur Štern in Live Finale.

== Cast ==
Presenter of The Farm was Anja Križnik Tomažin. Master of the farm was in first week Marijan Podobnik, who also appeared in the first two seasons. However he died in the second week of the show; his replacement was Vencelj Tušar who appeared from week 3 until the end.

== A grand prize ==
A top prize was a twist in this season. From the very beginning was a prize money €0. But this prize could increase through the season. Each week contestants will be given a task. The prize for each passed task is 50 sequins. But if task is incomplete the prize could be lower or even 0 sequins. Every week head of household could go on farmers market. On farmers market the HOH could buy goods for the family with earned sequins. On farmers market are three stalls:

1. Osnovne dobrine (Eng.: Basic goods)
2. Priboljški (Eng.: Goodies)
3. Luksus (Eng.: Luxuries)

On any of these stalls each product has own price. On first stall every product cost 1 sequin, on second two sequins and on third three sequins. Sequins that remain in final week are transmitted to real money by rate 1 sequin ... 100 euro. With 363 sequins remaining the winner Goran Breščanski won €36,300.

=== Alliance of final 4 ===
Final 4 contestants: Goran, Artur, Marijan and Maja P made an alliance in very first week. The goal of alliance was to make it to final 4 and split a grand prize among them. Alliance was created by Artur, HOH at the time in week 1. This alliance soon collapses but was reformed in final weeks. Marijan member of the alliance decided not to be part of alliance any more on the final night after has watched the season. So grand prize was split between just three of them; Artur, Marijan and Maja Prašnikar. Although Marijan won public prize; €13,700.

== Broadcasting ==
Farm of celebrities is broadcast by POP TV six nights a week.

On Tuesday, Wednesday, Thursday, Friday and Saturday, daily highlights from the farm are broadcast at 8 pm local time (Central European Time zone). These daily episodes run least 60 min including commercial breaks. In Monday's episode housemates read the eliminated contestant's letter in which he wrote who he determined to be the new HOH. In Tuesday's episode the HOH determines two servants (male and female). In the Friday episode contestants decide which of two servants should be first duelist. In Saturday's episode first duelist chose second duelist, they both move to isolated houses. Second duelist should choose which of three types of duels will be played. Three types are: Rope, Saw or Knowledge. If duelists are different genders the only possible duel is knowledge. At the end of episode the duel is played and loser of the duel is eliminated.

Once a week there is an on-air live episode. It is aired Monday at 9 pm CET. The show lasts 120 min including commercials. The show is presented by Anja Križnik Tomažin with three commentators; Goran Lean (contestant on second season of Kmetija), Angelca Likovič (retired Head teacher of primary school, mostly known by being a primary school teacher of previous Slovene prime minister Janez Janša), and Mark Žitnik (Slovene producer). A special guest is this week's eliminated contestant.

Live Launch is first episode of the series. In this episode are presented 10 celebrities that will be a contestants on the show. Unlike many other series contestants do not enter the farm in this episode, but in the first daily episode.

Live Finale final and ultimate episode of Kmetija Slavnih is the live finale. Two finalists are competing for a grand prize. In this episode all eliminated contestants guests are on the show. The winner should win at least two of three duels. Each type of duel is played once.

The audience is also offered 24 hours Internet feed on the web page. Unlike other programs such as Big Brother the live feed on Kmetija Slavnih is free.

== Contestants ==
Celebrity	Home	Occupation/Famous for...	Age
Alenka Sivka	Medvode	Journalist & Night radio program presenter	49
Aneta Andollini	Ljubljana	Miss Sport Slovenia 2008	23
Artur Štern	Ljubljana	Doctor, Fake candidate for president of RS	44
Daniel Popović	Domžale	Yugoslav representative in Eurovision Song Contest 1983	53
Fredi Miler	Prevalje	Singer	42
Goran Breščanski	Ljubljana	Singer of rock group Sausages	34
Ines Dolžan	Ljubljana	Miss Luna 2008 (Plus size beauty pageant)	28
La Toya	Tolmin	Porn Star	28
Maja Malnar	Ljubljana	Model & Singer	20
Maja Prašnikar	Trbovlje	Singer	27
Marijan Novina	Otočec	Musician	34
Miki Bubulj	Kranj	Comedian	27
Salome	Ljubljana	Transsexual, Singer	40
Suzana Jakšič	Koper	Housemate in Big Brother 1 Slovenia	41

== Nominations ==
	Round 1	Round 2	Round 3	Round 4	Round 5	Round 6	Round 7	Round 8	Round 9	Round 10	Round 11	Final	
Head of Household	Artur	Alenka	Marijan	Salome	Daniel	Artur	Marijan	Marijan	Aneta (Walked); Goran	None	None	None	
Leader Nominations	Salome; Suzana	Artur; La Toya	Maja P Miki	Alenka; Marijan	Goran; Salome	Marijan; Salome	Aneta; Ines	Goran; Maja M	Artur; Maja P	None	None	None	
Goran	Suzana	Artur	Miki	Alenka	Servant	Salome	Aneta	Servant	Maja P	No; Servant	Voted In	Winner (Finale)	
Artur	Head of Household	Servant	Maja	Alenka	Salome	Head of Household	Ines	Goran	Servant	No; Servant	Duelist	Runner-Up (Finale)	
Marijan	Suzana	Artur	Head of Household	Servant	Salome	Servant	Head of Household	Maja M	Maja P	No; Servant	Duelist	Evicted (Week 10)	
Maja P	Suzana	Artur	Servant	Marijan	Salome	Salome	Ines	Maja M	Servant	No; Servant	Evicted (Week 10)		
Daniel	Not in The Farm			Alenka	Head of Household	Salome	Aneta	Goran	Artur	Evicted (Week 9)			
Aneta	Not in The Farm						Servant	Maja M	No; Servant	Walked (Week 9)			
Maja M	Not in The Farm			Alenka	Salome	Salome	Ines	Servant	Walked (Week 8)				
Ines	Not in The Farm						Servant	Evicted (Week 7)					
Salome	Servant	La Toya	Maja	Head of Household	Servant	Servant	Walked (Week 6)						
La Toya	Suzana	Servant	Miki	Alenka	Salome	Evicted (Week 5)							
Alenka	Suzana	Head of Household	Miki	Servant	Evicted (Week 4)								
Miki	Suzana	La Toya	Servant	Evicted (Week 3)									
Fredi	Suzana	Artur	Evicted (Week 2)										
Suzana	Servant	Evicted (Week 1)											
Walked	None					Salome	None	Maja M	Aneta	None			
1st Dualist (By Contestants)	Suzana; 7/7 votes	Artur; 4/6 votes	Miki; 3/5 votes	Alenka; 5/6 votes	Salome; 5/5 votes	Salome; 4/4 votes	Aneta; 2/6 votes	Maja M 3/5 votes	Maja P 2/3 votes	None	None	None	
2nd Dualist (By 1st Dualist)	Salome	Fredi	Artur	La Toya	La Toya	Maja M	Ines	Maja P	Daniel	None	None	None	
Evicted	Suzana; Lost duel	Fredi; Lost duel	Miki; Lost duel	Miki; Lost duel	Alenka; Lost duel	La Toya; Lost duel	Ines; Lost duel	Eviction; Cancelled	Daniel; Lost duel	Maja P (By Ex-Contestants)	Marijan; Lost duel	Artur; Lost duel to win	Goran; Lost duel to win
