= Kukeč =

Kukeč Újkökényes
- Location in Slovenia
- Coordinates: 46°45′8.42″N 16°12′55.79″E
- Country: Slovenia
- Traditional region: Prekmurje
- Statistical region: Mura
- Municipality: Gornji Petrovci

Area
  - Total: 3.3 km^{2} (1.3 sq mi)
- Elevation: 318.9 m (1,046 ft)

Population (2020)
  - Total: 55
  - Density: 17/km^{2} (43/sq mi)

Kukeč (pronounced [ˈkuːkɛtʃ]; Hungarian: Újkökényes, Prekmurje Slovene: Kükeč) is a small settlement in the Municipality of Gornji Petrovci in the Prekmurje region of Slovenia.
