= Kmetija season 4 =

Kmetija 2011 is the 4th edition of Kmetija, the Slovene version of The Farm. The airings finishes in mid-December 2011. As well as all previous seasons of Kmetija is also this produced by Proplus and broadcast by POP TV. Lili Žagar, previously presenter of daily informative program Svet na kanalu A (World on channel A) along with his husband Marko Potrč, is the presenter of the show. Unlike previous seasons when farm was recorded in Upper Carniola Alps is in this season all set in Pohorje in Lower Styria.

== Live Shows ==
Every week is broadcast Live Show in Sunday at 8. Presenter of shows is Lili Žagar. In studio are also three celebrity commentators:

1. Angelca Likovič: Former Head teacher of one of Ljubljana's primary schools, primary school teacher of ex Slovenia's prime minister Janez Janša.
2. Lara Janković: actress, chanson singer, hostess
3. Jože Činč: Radio host, The winner of Celebrity Big Brother Slovenia Season 1

== Contestants ==
| Contestant | Age | Hometown | Civil Status | Education Level | Finished | Exit | Note |
|---|---|---|---|---|---|---|---|
| Matej Drečnik | 29 | Cerklje ob Krki | Single | V | Evicted; Winner | Week 4 Week 10 | Replacement for Andrej; He won immunity, spending 3,000 Euro out of grand prize in week 8. First finalist, chosen by evicted contestants. |
| Vlasta Povšnar | 45 | Šentjur | Divorced | V | Runner-up | Week 10 | 3 votes to evict before semifinal Won semifinal dual to Darko |
| Simon Bukovnik | 34 | Šenčur | Dating | V | Evicted | Week 5 | Lost dual to Matej |
| Valerija Verhovnik | 36 | Ankaran | Dating | VIII-I | Evicted | Week 9 | Lost dual to Darko |
| Darko Mislovič | 35 | Lovrenc na Pohorju | Divorced | IV | 3rd place | Week 10 | Lost semifinal dual to Vlasta |
| Leonida Pahič Miša | 50 | Rečica ob Savinji | Married | ?? | Evicted | Week 7 | Lost dual to Vlasta |
| Damjan Ocvirk | 35 | Šempeter | Married | V | Evicted | Week 6 | Lost dual to |
| Tina Radej | 32 | Sevnica | Single | V | Evicted | Week 3 | Lost dual to Damjan |
| Miha Kadunc | 33 | Ljubljana | Single | V | Evicted | Week 2 | Lost dual to Simon |
| Esada Rastoder | 25 | Ljubljana | Married | VI | Evicted | Week 3 | Lost dual to Valerija |
| Avgust Grah Tone | 55 | Kočevska Reka | Married | IV | Evicted | Week 1 | Lost dual to Esada |
| Vesna Kranjc † | 28 | Štore | Married | IV | 4th placer | Week 10 | 5 votes to evict before semifinal |
| Andrej Milek | 28 | Dobrunje | Dating | II | Voluntary left | Week 7 | Intruder in week 6 |
| Ivo Ivičič | 22 | Črnomelj | Single | VI | Evicted by fellow contestants | Week 6 | Intruder in week 6 |

== The Prize ==
For the first time in Slovenia's reality shows history the grand prize is not money. But the farm on which will be show recorded along with 12 ha of land.
Contestants can earn kick-off capital for the winner of the farm. Every week they can won 50 sequins, but they should spend 30 or 40 to buy material to complete next week task. The rest can be spent on goods. They saved 63 sequins to the end, the winner will won 6,300 Euro kick-off capital.

== After Series ==
In December 2011 finalists of season Matej Derečnik in Vlasta Povšnar got married.
