= Bar (Slovenian TV series) =

Slovenian reality show

Bar is a reality show aired by the commercial television station Pop TV, in which contestants live in the same house for three months and compete against each other to see who can run a bar (establishment) most effectively. For a small fee, viewers can watch the show live on the show's website, where over 20 cameras track the contestants' daily activities. Pop TV airs a summary of each day's events every evening, excluding Sundays.

Each Wednesday, competitors rate each other's performance by assigning each other either pluses or minuses. The competitor who receives the most minuses, and the contestant chosen by the one with the most pluses, find themselves in the "hot seat" and must compete against each other on Saturday night. Viewers vote by telephone which one of the contestants will remain in the show. The competitor with the lowest number of votes must leave the bar. The bar manager supervises the competitors.

== Season 1 ==
Competitors run the local AS Lounge in Knafelj underpass in Ljubljana. The bar manager was Gaber Žgavc, the host is Bastjan Kepic .

- Start Date: 25 September 2005.
- End Date: 17 December 2005.
- Duration: 84 days.
- Prize: 5,000,000 SIT (20,846 EUR) + Car

=== Contestants ===
Contestant	Residence	Occupation	Age
Alma Brdzanoviæ	Ljubljana		19
Andrej Lavric	Ljubljana		21
Azbe Slapar	Ljubljana		25
Boris Buksek	Ljubljana		24
Tanja Drolc, "Cupi"	Šenčur		21
Jasna	Škofije		21
Klemen Kalsek	Zagorje ob Savi		26
Matjaz Marusic	Hrvatini		25
Matjaz	Ljubljana		19
Miso Stevanovic	Maribor		26
Rada Vukobrat	Grosuplje		20
Sara Jurjavcic	Koper		27
Tanja Golob	Ljubljana		24
Tina Zarki	Ljubljana		23

=== Nominations ===
	Round 1	Round 2	Round 3	Round 4	Round 5	Round 6	Round 7		Round 8	Round 9	Round 10	Round 11	Final	
Andrej	Boris; Alma	Boris; Matjaz	Azbe; Alma	Miso; Rada	Boris; Azbe	Miso; Cupi	Boris; Klemen	Jasna	Jasna; Rada	Jasna; Rada	Sara; Rada	Miso; Sara	Winner (Day 84)	
Miso	Boris; Tina	Azbe; Cupi	Klemen; Alma	Sara; Rada	Andrej; Azbe	Rada; Cupi	Boris; Andrej	Jasna	Sara; Jasna	Sara; Jasna	Andrej; Rada	Sara; Andrej	Runner-Up (Day 84)	
Sara	Boris; Alma	Klemen; Rada	Cupi; Alma	Azbe; Rada	Boris; Klemen	Klemen; Rada	Boris; Andrej	Jasna	Rada; Andrej	Miso; Jasna	Miso; Andrej	Miso; Andrej	Evicted (Day 77)	
Rada	Cupi; Matjaz	Cupi; Matjaz	Andrej; Alma	Miso; Sara	Boris; Azbe	Andrej; Sara	Klemen; Boris	Jasna	Sara; Jasna	Miso; Andrej	Sara; Andrej	Evicted (Day 70)		
Jasna	Not in The Bar						No; Nominate	Nominated	Boris; Rada	Andrej; Miso	Evicted (Day 63)			
Boris	Azbe; Alma	Miso; Matjaz	Sara; Alma	Tanja; Andrej	Sara; Azbe	Klemen; Cupi	Miso; Rada	Jasna	Sara; Andrej	Evicted (Day 56)				
Matjaz #2	Not in The Bar						No; Nominate	Nominated	Evicted (Day 48)					
Klemen	Miso; Tanja	Azbe; Rada	Boris; Alma	Cupi; Rada	Sara; Andrej	Rada; Cupi	Boris; Andrej	Jasna	Evicted (Day 49)					
Cupi	Boris; Tina	Azbe; Matjaz	Rada; Alma	Sara; Andrej	Boris; Andrej	Sara; Andrej	Evicted (Day 42)							
Azbe	Miso; Tanja	Klemen; Rada	Tanja; Alma	Klemen; Rada	Sara; Cupi	Evicted (Day 35)								
Tanja	Boris; Tina	Azbe; Matjaz	Miso; Alma	Boris; Rada	Evicted (Day 28)									
Alma	Andrej; Tina	Azbe; Matjaz	Azbe; Cupi	Evicted (Day 21)										
Matjaz	Klemen; Tanja	Andrej; Rada	Evicted (Day 14)											
Tina	Andrej; Azbe	Evicted (Day 7)												
Highest Score	Boris (+5)	Azbe (+5)	Azbe (+2)	Miso (+2)	Boris (+4)	Klemen (+2)	Boris (+3)	None	Sara (+3)	Miso (+1)	Sara (+2)	Miso (+2)	None	
Lowest Score (1st Nominated)	Tina (-4)	Matjaz (-6)	Alma (-9)	Rada (-6)	Azbe (-4)	Cupi (-4)	Andrej (-3)	None	Andrej (-2)	Jasna (-1)	Rada (-2)	Andrej (-2); Sara (0)	None	
2nd Nominated (By Highest Score)	Alma	Tanja	Andrej	Tanja	Miso	Andrej	Klemen	None	Boris	Andrej	Miso	None	None	
Evicted	Tina ??% to save	Matjaz ??% to save	Alma ??% to save	Tanja ??% to save	Azbe; 23.3% to save	Cupi; 41.3% to save	Klemen; 41.2% to save	Matjaz #2; 0/6 votes to stay	Boris; 44% to save	Jasna; 36.2% to save	Rada; 39% to save	Sara; 45.3% to save		
Evicted	Tina ??% to save	Matjaz ??% to save	Alma ??% to save	Tanja ??% to save	Azbe; 23.3% to save	Cupi; 41.3% to save	Klemen; 41.2% to save	Matjaz #2; 0/6 votes to stay	Boris; 44% to save	Jasna; 36.2% to save	Rada; 39% to save	Sara; 45.3% to save	Miso; 44.1% to win	Andrej; 55.9% to win

== Season 2 ==
Competitors run the basement pub Centre Bachus in Congress Square in Ljubljana. In the second season, the contestants were originally divided into two groups ("white" and "black"). The groups were disbanded in the sixth week of the competition. When contestant Tina had to leave at the end of the show's sixth week, she was replaced by her twin sister, Ines.

- Name: Bar II.
- Start Date: 23 September 2006.
- End Date: 16 December 2006.
- Duration: 85 days.
- Prize: 12,000,000 SIT (50,000 EUR)

=== Contestants ===
Contestant	Residence	Occupation	Age
Bojana Kosi	Sveta Trojica		28
Emil Širić	Laško		27
Gašper Papež	Ljubljana		20
Gregor Zonta	Ankaran		24
Ines Hižar*	Medvode		26
Jernej Zavadlav	Opatje Selo		22
Katja Kranjc	Maribor		23
Klemen Pungartnik	Mežica		29
Maja Hribar	Ljubljana		20
Petra Gorenc	Ljubljana		22
Tamara Kolednik	Maribor		18
Tina Hižar*	Medvode		26
Špela Kumar	Pijava Gorica		23
Žiga Trkulja	Ljubljana		20

* Twin sisters

=== Nominations ===
	Round 1	Round 2	Round 3	Round 4	Round 5	Round 6	Round 7	Round 8	Round 9	Round 10	Round 11	Final	
Emil	Klemen; Špela	Immune	Immune	Tina; Tamara	Gregor; Tina	Immune	Gregor; Jernej	Gregor; Bojana	Špela; Jernej	Klemen; Gregor	Gregor; Klemen	Winner (Day 85)	
Gregor	Klemen; Jernej	Immune	Immune	Tina; Tamara	Emil; Gašper	Immune	Emil; Jernej	Emil; Jernej	Klemen; Jernej	Klemen; Špela	Emil; Klemen	Runner-Up (Day 85)	
Klemen	Emil; Špela	Žiga; Petra	Katja; Žiga	Immune	Immune	Bojana; Jernej	Ejected (Day 40)		Gregor; Jernej	Emil; Špela	Gregor; Emil	Evicted (Day 78)	
Špela	Bojana; Klemen	Immune	Immune	Immune	Immune	Immune	Gregor, Gregor; Jernej	Emil; Jernej	Gregor; Jernej	Klemen; Gregor	Evicted (Day 71)		
Jernej	Emil; Špela	Jernej; Petra	Žiga; Katja	Immune	Immune	Žiga; Klemen	Bojana, Emil; Žiga	Bojana; Špela	Emil; Špela	Evicted (Day 64)			
Ines	Not in The Bar						Immune	Špela; Jernej	Evicted (Day 61)				
Bojana	Klemen; Gašper	Jernej, Klemen; Petra	Jernej; Katja	Immune	Immune	Žiga; Klemen	Jernej, Emil; Žiga	Ines; Gregor	Evicted (Day 57)				
Žiga	Katja; Klemen	Klemen, Klemen; Petra	Jernej; Klemen	Immune	Immune	Jernej; Klemen	Emil, Emil; Špela	Evicted (Day 50)					
Tina	Emil; Špela	Immune	Immune	Gašper; Tamara	Emil; Gašper	Immune	Evicted (Day 43)						
Gašper	Emil; Katja	Immune	Immune	Gregor; Tamara	Emil; Tina	Evicted (Day 36)							
Tamara	Bojana; Špela	Immune	Immune	Tina; Emil	Evicted (Day 29)								
Katja	Žiga; Špela	Žiga, Klemen; Petra	Klemen; Bojana	Evicted (Day 22)									
Petra	Tamara; Maja	Jernej, Jernej; Žiga	Evicted (Day 15)										
Maja	Bojana; Špela	Evicted (Day 8)											
Highest Score	Emil (+4)	Klemen (+2, +3)	Jernej (+2)	Tina (+3)	Emil (+3)	Žiga (+2)	Emil (+2, +3)	Emil (+2)	Gregor (+2)	Klemen (+3)	Gregor (+2)	None	
Lowest Score (1st Nominated)	Špela (-7)	Petra (-5)	Katja (-1)	Tamara (-4)	Tina (-2)	Klemen (-3); Ejected	Jernej (-2)	Jernej (-3)	Jernej (-4)	Špela (-2)	Klemen (-2); Emil (0)	None	
2nd Nominated (By Highest Score)	Maja	Žiga	Klemen	Emil	Gašper	Gregor; Tina	Žiga	Bojana	Špela	Emil	None	None	
Evicted	Maja; 25.06% to save	Petra; 26.23% to save	Katja; 41.13% to save	Tamara; 12.89% to save	Gašper; 39.34% to save	Tina; 44.73% to save	Žiga; 43.94% to save	Bojana; 45.17% to save	Jernej; 31.19% to save	Špela; 33.8% to save	Klemen; 35.54% to save		
Evicted	Maja; 25.06% to save	Petra; 26.23% to save	Katja; 41.13% to save	Tamara; 12.89% to save	Gašper; 39.34% to save	Tina; 44.73% to save	Žiga; 43.94% to save	Bojana; 45.17% to save	Jernej; 31.19% to save	Špela; 33.8% to save	Klemen; 35.54% to save	Gregor; 49.24% to won	Emil; 50.76% to won
Evicted	Maja; 25.06% to save	Petra; 26.23% to save	Katja; 41.13% to save	Tamara; 12.89% to save	Gašper; 39.34% to save	Tina; 44.73% to save	Žiga; 43.94% to save	Ines; By Returned Klemen	Jernej; 31.19% to save	Špela; 33.8% to save	Klemen; 35.54% to save	Gregor; 49.24% to won	Emil; 50.76% to won

== Season 3 ==
Denis Vikić will be the Bar manager and the prize will be 50.000 €. The Bar will be located in Ljubljana at the top of a building.

- Name: Bar 2015.
- Start Date: 2 March 2015.
- End Date: 13 June 2015.
- Duration: 104 days.
- Prize: 50,000 Euro

=== Contestants ===
Contestant	Residence	Occupation	Age
Črt Banko	Piran	Economist	33
Damjan Brajko	Portorož	Barman	26
Danijel Lindič	Boštanj	Salesman	28
Dolores Jakomin	Velenje	Student / Ivica's daughter	21
Emi Nikočević	Škofja Loka	Banking consultant	23
Eva Puppis	Šenčur	Student	25
Ivica Kumer Jakomin	Velenje	Saleswoman / Mother of Dolores	39
Ivona Pavlović	Ljubljana	-	20
Joel Srbu	Ljubljana	Economics technician	26
Kim Habijan	Domžale	-	23
Maruša Trampuž	Sežana	Student	24
Miloš Mar	Ljubljana	Model	26
Nataša Bernik	Maribor	-	33
Nejc Rek	Velenje	Writer	24
Rene Šantić	Kamnik	Economics technician	27
Sanja Kerić	Piran	Economist	24
Suzana Zeković	Murska Sobota	Economist	24
Tanja Balabanić	Vrhnika	Saleswoman	30
Vita Udovič	Novo Mesto	Student	23

=== Nominations ===
	Week 1	Week 2	Week 3	Week 4	Week 5	Week 6	Week 7	Week 8	Week 9	Week 10	Week 11	Week 12	Week 13	Week 14	Final	
Črt	Rene; Vita	Joel; Eva	Sanja; Danijel	Damjan; Kim	Tanja; Nejc	Ivona; Vita	Joel; Nejc	Damjan; Ivica	Joel; Suzana	Joel; Ivona	Joel; Ivona	Joel; Suzana	Joel; Suzana	Ivona; Suzana	Winner (Day 104)	
Ivona	Not in The Bar		Nominated	Vita; Kim	Emi; Rene	Vita; Sanja	Črt; Damjan	Emi; Suzana	Emi; Suzana	Emi; Tanja	Emi; Sanja	Joel; Suzana	Suzana; Joel	Suzana; Črt	Runner-Up (Day 104)	
Suzana	Joel; Maruša	Rene; Miloš	Sanja; Danijel	Črt; Vita	Damjan; Nejc	Emi; Sanja	Damjan; Ivona	Damjan; Ivica	Emi; Damjan	Emi; Tanja	Emi; Sanja	Emi; Joel	Ivona; Joel	Ivona; Črt	Evicted (Day 98)	
Joel	Sanja; Maruša	Črt; Suzana	Črt; Emi	Damjan; Suzana	Damjan; Nejc	Črt; Vita	Sanja; Nejc	Črt; Ivica	Sanja; Suzana	Črt; Ivona	Črt; Ivona	Črt; Suzana	Črt; Suzana	Evicted (Day 90)		
Emi	Tanja; Maruša	Vita; Danijel	Črt; Danijel	Vita; Tanja	Nejc; Rene	Ivona; Tanja	Suzana; Tanja	Sanja; Ivica	Ivona; Damjan	Ivona; Tanja	Ivona; Sanja	Ivona; Joel	Evicted (Day 83)			
Sanja	Joel; Maruša	Joel; Eva	Joel; Danijel	Joel; Suzana	Joel; Nejc	Joel; Vita	Joel; Ivona	Črt; Ivica	Emi; Suzana	Joel; Ivona	Joel; Ivona	Evicted (Day 76)				
Tanja	Rene; Suzana	Danijel; Miloš	Joel; Danijel	Damjan; Tanja	Damjan; Nejc	Sanja; Vita	Črt; Nejc	Črt; Ivica	Damjan; Suzana	Emi; Ivona	Evicted (Day 69)					
Damjan	Not in The Bar	Immune	Črt; Rene	Rene; Ivona	Vita; Emi	Tanja; Emi	Suzana; Ivona	Črt; Ivica	Črt; Suzana	Evicted (Day 62)						
Ivica	Not in The Bar						Nejc; Tanja	Ivona; Emi	Evicted (Day 55)							
Dolores	Not in The Bar						Nejc; Tanja	Walked (Day 49)								
Nejc	Not in The Bar			Kim; Vita	Emi; Rene	Emi; Tanja	Emi; Joel	Evicted (Day 48)								
Vita	Rene; Emi	Emi; Suzana	Sanja; Rene	Črt; Kim	Joel; Nejc	Emi; Tanja	Evicted (Day 41)									
Rene	Črt; Miloš	Črt; Emi	Sanja; Emi	Damjan; Vita	Damjan; Nejc	Evicted (Day 34)										
Kim	Not in The Bar		Nominated	Joel; Ivona	Evicted (Day 27)											
Danijel	Rene; Vita	Joel; Suzana	Joel; Emi	Evicted (Day 20)												
Nataša	Not in The Bar		Nominated	Evicted by Bar Manager (Day 20)												
Eva	Joel; Emi	Miloš; Suzana	Evicted (Day 13)													
Miloš	Črt; Vita	Črt; Suzana	Walked (Day 12)													
Maruša	Vita; Emi	Evicted (Day 6)														
Notes	None	1	2, 3	4	5	-	6, 7	8	-	-	9	10, 11	12, 13, 14	-	None	
Highest Score	Rene (+4)	Joel* (+3)	Sanja (+4)	Damjan (+4)	Damjan (+4)	Emi (+3)	Suzana* (+5)	Črt (+3)	Emi (+3)	Emi (+3)	Emi (+3)	Joel (+3)	Črt* (+2)	Ivona (+2)	None	
Lowest Score (1st Nominated)	Maruša (-4)	Suzana (-5)	Danijel (-5)	Kim (-4)	Emi (-5)	Vita (-4)	Nejc* (-5)	Ivica (-7)	Suzana (-6)	Ivona (-4)	Sanja (-4)	Suzana (-3)	Joel* (-2)	Črt (-2)	None	
2nd Nominated (By Highest Score)	Miloš	Eva	Emi	Ivona	Rene	Tanja	Ivona	Suzana	Damjan	Tanja	Črt	Emi	Ivona	Suzana	None	
Evicted	Maruša ??% to evict	Eva ??% to evict	Danijel ??% to evict	Kim ??% to evict	Rene ??% to evict	Vita ??% to evict	Nejc ??% to evict	Ivica ??% to evict	Damjan ??% to evict	Tanja ??% to evict	Sanja ??% to evict	Emi ??% to evict	Joel ??% to evict	Suzana ??% to evict		
Evicted	Maruša ??% to evict	Eva ??% to evict	Danijel ??% to evict	Kim ??% to evict	Rene ??% to evict	Vita ??% to evict	Nejc ??% to evict	Ivica ??% to evict	Damjan ??% to evict	Tanja ??% to evict	Sanja ??% to evict	Emi ??% to evict	Joel ??% to evict	Suzana ??% to evict	Ivona ??% to win	Črt ??% to win

Notes

- ^Note 1: There was a tie with 3 positives each between Črt and Joel, so they voted again between them: Črt (Rene, Suzana, Tanja & Vita) Joel (Danijel, Emi, Eva, Miloš & Sanja), so Joel with 5 votes is the positive this week.
- ^Note 2: On day ?, the contestants voted to keep one of the 3 intruders. with 5 votes Ivona was the chosen (I don't have who voted who).
- ^Note 3: Denis as bar manager, decided to keep Kim, so Nataša was evicted.
- ^Note 4: There was a tie between Kim and Vita with 3 negatives, so they voted again. but Kim was chosen as the first nominee.
- ^Note 5: Nejc received the most negatives, with a total of 7/10, however he was part of a secret mission, as he had to receive the most negatives in order to be safe (he won immunity only for this vote, he can still be chosen on Saturday). A new vote was done, and Emi was chosen as the negative this week..
- ^Note 6: There was a tie with 2 positives between Črt, Joel & Suzana, so a second round for both votes was done: Črt (Dolores/Ivica, Ivona, Suzana & Tanja), Joel (Črt) & Suzana (Damjan, Joel, Emi, Nejc & Sanja). With 5 votes, Suzana is the positive.
- ^Note 7: There was a tie with 3 negatives between Ivona & Nejc, so a second round for both votes was done: Ivona (Damjan, Sanja & Suzana) & Nejc (Dolores/Ivica, Črt, Joel, Emi & Tanja). With 5 votes, Nejc is the minus and the first nominee.
- ^Note 8: On April 19, Dolores decided to leave the show because she was missing her child and the person who was taking care of him had to leave. Ivica stayed in the apartment and competed as a single contestant.
- ^Note 9: Danijel, Eva & Miloš returned to the Bar this week to help the other contestants and they had to give joint a Plus/Minus vote: Emi and Sanja.
- ^Note 10: Danijel, Eva & Miloš vote: Črt and Joel.
- ^Note 11: Denis, the Bar Manager, chose the best barman of the week who will receive an extra plus. For this week, he chose Joel.
- ^Note 12: Danijel, Eva & Miloš vote: Črt and Ivona.
- ^Note 13: Denis, the Bar Manager, chose the best barman of the week who will receive an extra plus. For this week, he chose Suzana.
- ^Note 14: There was a tie with 2 positives between Črt & Suzana and 2 negatives between Joel & Suzana, so a second round for both votes was done: Črt (Danijel/Eva/Miloš & Joel) & Suzana (Manager & Ivona). There was a tie again, so Črt is the positive for not having received any minus. On negative: Joel (Ivona & Danijel/Eva/Miloš) & Suzana (Črt). Joel is the minus.
