= Kmetija season 2 =

Kmetija 2 was the second season of Farm franchise of Slovenia was aired on 29 September 2008 to 12 December 2008 by POP TV. 17 contestants compete for a grand prize 50,000 € ten weeks. Špela Močnik, radio host returned as the hostess for Kmetija 2008. After 10 weeks of the show only allies Daša and Bilijana remained in the game. During live final that happen one week after daily episodes ended Cirila Jeršin won in the final live duel against Sergej, so Cirila become the winner of the farm and the 50,000 € grand prize along with the title of Kmetija 2008.

== Contestants ==
Contestant	Home	Occupation	Age
Aleš Bavdek	Sveti Vid		35
Alexander Bakharev	Tomsk, Russia		20
Andrej	Bizeljsko		43
Anka Vovk	Sevnica		21
Boro	Ljubljana		47
Cirila Jeršin	Medvode		59
Davor Mihajlovič	Maribor		28
Goran Leban	Kočevje		54
Maja	Šentjur		26
Miha	Mežica		28
Mojca Ramuta	Metlika		23
Robert	Ljubljana		21
Sabina	Krašči		30
Sergej Kosman	Kočevje		32
Simona Rifelj	Ždinja Vas		21
Špela Poberaj	Ljubljana		23
Veronika Ivartnik	Kotlje		21

== Nominations ==
	Round 1	Round 2	Round 3	Round 4	Round 5	Round 6	Round 7	Round 8	Round 9	Round 10	Final	
Farm Leader (Immunity)	Cirila	Sergej	Sergej	Alexander	Veronika	Cirila	Miha	Goran	Miha	-	None	
Leader Nominations	Alexander; Špela	Goran; Veronika	Goran; Mojca	Sergej; Špela	-	Aleš; Simona	Goran; Simona	Anka; Miha	Cirila; Goran	-	None	
Cirila	Immune	Goran	Goran	Špela	-	Immune	Simona	Anka	Nominated	Nominated	Winner (Day 75)	
Sergej	Alexander	Immune	Immune	Nominated	Evicted (Day 26)			Anka	Goran	Nominated	Runner-Up (Day 75)	
Miha	Not in The Farm	Immune	Immune	Immune	Nominated	Simona	Goran	Nominated	Immune	Nominated	Evicted (Day 67)	
Goran	Špela	Nominated	Nominated	Sergej	-	Simona	Nominated	Immune	Nominated	Evicted (Day 61)		
Simona	Not in The Farm					Nominated	Nominated	Anka	Walked (Day 57)			
Anka	Not in The Farm	Immune	Immune	Immune	Nominated	Simona	Goran	Nominated	Evicted (Day 54)			
Alexander	Nominated	Veronika	Mojca	Immune	-	Simona	Simona	Evicted (Day 47)				
Veronika	Alexander	Nominated	Mojca	Sergej	Immune	Simona	Goran	Walked (Day 46)				
Aleš	Not in The Farm					Nominated	Evicted (Day 40)					
Sabina	Alexander	Goran	Goran	Sergej	-	Evicted (Day 33)						
Andrej	Not in The Farm	Immune	Immune	Immune	Nominated	Evicted (Day 33)						
Špela	Nominated	Goran	Mojca	Nominated	Ejected (Day 26)							
Davor	Špela	Goran	Mojca	Špela	Ejected (Day 26)							
Mojca	Alexander	Goran	Nominated	Evicted (Day 19)								
Maja	Alexander	Veronika	Mojca	Walked (Day 18)								
Boro	Špela	Goran	Evicted (Day 12)									
Robert	Špela	Evicted (Day 5)										
1st Nominated (By Group)	Alexander; 5/9 votes	Goran; 6/8 votes	Mojca; 5/7 votes	Sergej; 3/5 votes	-	Aleš; 0/5 votes	Goran; 3/5 votes	Anka; 3/3 votes	Goran; 1/1 votes	Cirila (1/7 votes); Miha (1/7 votes)	None	
2nd Nominated (by 1st Nominated)	Robert	Boro	Špela	Goran	-	Alexander	Alexander	Simona	Sergej	Cirila (1/7 votes); Miha (1/7 votes)	None	
Evicted	Robert; Lost duel	Boro; Lost duel	Mojca; Lost duel	Sergej; Lost duel	Andrej; Lost duel	Aleš; Lost duel	Alexander; Lost duel	Anka; Lost duel	Goran; Lost duel	Miha; Lost duel	Sergej lose final duel	
Evicted	Robert; Lost duel	Boro; Lost duel	Mojca; Lost duel	Sergej; Lost duel	Andrej; Lost duel	Aleš; Lost duel	Alexander; Lost duel	Anka; Lost duel	Goran; Lost duel	Miha; Lost duel	Sergej lose final duel	Cirila won final duel
Evicted	Robert; Lost duel	Boro; Lost duel	Mojca; Lost duel	Sergej; Lost duel	Sabina; Lost duel	Aleš; Lost duel	Alexander; Lost duel	Anka; Lost duel	Goran; Lost duel	Miha; Lost duel	Sergej lose final duel	Cirila won final duel
