= Planet TV (Slovenian TV channel) =

Slovenian commercial television channel

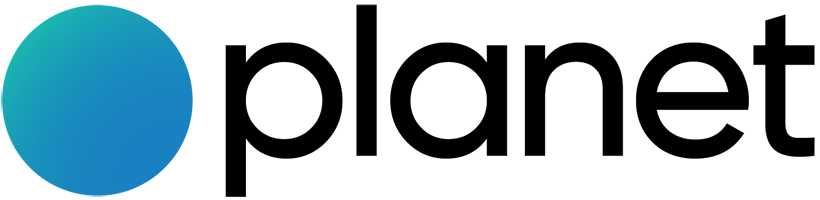
- Country: Slovenia
- Broadcast area: Slovenia
- Headquarters: Ljubljana, Slovenia

Programming
- Language: Slovenian

Ownership
- Owner: Planet TV, Television Activities d.o.o. (TV2 Group)
- Sister channels: Planet 2 Planet Eva

History
- Launched: 18 September 2012; 14 years ago

Links
- Website: Official website

Planet TV is a Slovenian commercial television station with national coverage. It began broadcasting in 18 September 2012 and is present on the market with three channels: Planet, Planet 2 and Planet Eva.

Planet TV broadcasts mainly entertainment and informational content with its three programs for now. The executive director is Pavel Stantchev, the program director is Alenka Medič, and the editor-in-chief of the news program Planet 18 is Uroš Urbanija.

== History ==
Planet TV began broadcasting on 18 September 2012. The first broadcast content was selected Tuesday Champions League matches with an accompanying studio program hosted by Dani Bavec. The entire programming schedule came into being on 5 November 2012 with the news program Today (Danes), which was initially broadcast at 6:40 p.m. In addition to the aforementioned shows, the reality show Paradise Hotel, the business reality show Good Deal (Dober posel), and entertainment shows, series, and films were also broadcast.

On 9 March 2013, the news program Today (Danes) was moved to the 7:30 p.m. time slot. In April 2013, new shows were introduced, such as the couples' gambling show My Sweetheart Can Do It (Moj dragi zmore), the comedy show DA with Denis Avdić, and the quiz show Money Is Falling (Denar pada) with Jonas Žnidaršič. During the summer, domestic production consisted of the quiz show Who Will Be Who? (Kdo bo koga?; aired from Monday to Friday) and on weekends, the cooking show Kitchen for the Best (Kuhinja za najbolje). In the fall of 2013, the new season of UEFA Champions League football matches began to be broadcast, as did the new entertainment show Planet StandUp, featuring Slovenian and foreign comedians, Citizen Toš (Državljan Toš) with Tadej Toš, and the reality show Love In The Country (Ljubezen na deželi). On Saturdays at 5:15 p.m., broadcasts of football matches from the First Slovenian Football League were broadcast.

In June 2014, Marijan Jurenec became the director of Planet TV, and Bojan Traven became the director and editor-in-chief of the news and sports program. The Danes show moved again on 14 July 2014, to 7 p.m. It was hosted alternately by Mirko Mayer, Uroš Slak, and Anja Markovič.

In the fall of 2014, the reality show Farm: A New Beginning (Kmetija: Nov začetak), the show with young talents Talent Class (Razred talentov), the 4th season of the show My Sweetheart Can Do It (Moj dragi zmore), and the entertainment show God Forbid The TV Would Die (Bognedaj, da bi crknu televiziju) started. In December of the same year, Tomaž Perovič became the director of news and sports. In January 2015, the comedy improvisational show Shoot! (Ustreli!) began airing. In the spring of 2015, the 5th season of the show My Sweetheart Can Do It (Moj dragi zmore; this time with hosts Marko Potrč and Lili Žagar) and the reality show Bar, which took place in Ljubljana's Nebotičnik, were broadcast. In 2015, the first season of the weekly satirical show This Week With Jure Godler (Ta teden z Juretom Godlerjem) and the first season of the series One Noble Story (Ena žlahtna štorija) also aired.

In 2016, the only season (53 episodes) of the Slovenian comedy series Yes Dear! Yes Dear! (Da, dragi! Da, draga!) aired. It is a series based on the Canadian French-language original Un gars, une fille (A Guy, A Girl). The series Garlic and Dear Neighbors (Česnovi in Dragi sosedje) followed in 2017. The reality weight loss show The Biggest Loser was launched in Slovenia with The Biggest Loser Slovenia (The Biggest Loser Slovenija). 2018 marked the launch of the magazine show Day (Dan.), the launch of the shows New Star of Slovenia (Nova zvezda Slovenije) and Project Diva (Projekt Diva), and in March of the same year, the start of the series Mountain Dreams (Gorske sanje). The series was supposed to have 80 episodes filmed in its first season, but filming stopped in April due to non-payment of the film crew, resulting in 31 episodes being aired.

In 2019, the main news program was renamed Planet 18, moved to the 6:00 PM time slot, and visually and host-wise redesigned (its hosts (alternating) were Igor Krmelj and Valentina Plaskan). In the spring of the same year, the first season of the Slovenian version of the quiz show Who Wants To Be A Millionaire? was broadcast, hosted by Slavko Bobovnik. This was followed by the reality show Fittest Family Slovenia (Fittest Family Slovenija), the show Celebrities For The First Time Behind The Wheel (Znani prvič za volanom), in which celebrities gained and improved their driving experience, the dance show Dance In Love (Zapleši v ljubezen) and the shows Find Yourself and Let's Exchange Wives (Znajdi se and Menjamo ženi), which only had two episodes. A show featuring Slovenian entertainment and folk music, At Black Peter's (Pri Črnem Petru), hosted by Jasna Kuljaj, was also introduced, and regular characters in the show include Alja Prgin with comedians Sašo Dobnik (Gasilec Sašo), Sašo Đukić, and Boštjan Meglič.

In 2020, the recording of the show Train like Tadej Pogačar (Treniraj kot Tadej Pogačar) began. The show Planet Visiting (Planet na obisku) was also introduced, which presents places around Slovenia, and the show Survival In The Wilderness (Preživetje v divjini). At the same time, Jure Godler took over the hosting of the quiz show Millionaire (Milijonar).

In the spring of 2021, the first season of the licensed reality singing show Who Are You? Stars Under Mask (Kdo si ti? Zvezde pod masko) with Klemen Slakonja took place in Hungary. This was followed by the quiz show The Pyramid of Happiness (Piramida sreče) with Jonas Žnidaršič and the magazine show Planet Wow (Planet Vau), which was initially hosted by Gaja Prestor. In the fall of 2021, the first season of the reality sports show Exatlon Slovenia (Exatlon Slovenija) was broadcast with host Miran Ališič, which was filmed in the Dominican Republic. Production of the morning show Morning On The Planet (Jutro na Planetu) with Suzana Kozel and Taiji Tokuhisa has also begun. The show The Real Housewives of Slovenia: Devil's Ladies (The Real Housewives Slovenija: Vražje dame) and the show Personally with Valentina Plaskan (Osebno z Valentina Plaskan), which features guests from Slovenia's politically influential, socially significant and famous people, have begun airing. At the same time, Sanja Grohar took over the management of the Planet Vau program. In the fall of 2021, Katarina Braniselj joined the editorial staff of the news program, and together with Igor Krmelj, she took over the management of the Planet 18 program. Valentina Plaskan moved to the talk show Osebno z Valentina Plaskan. The political commentary talk show and infotainment Power Hour with Bojan Požar (Ura moči z Bojanom Požarjem) also joined the schedule.

In 2022, Planet TV's spring programming schedule included the 6th season of the quiz show Millionaire (Milijonar), the 5th season of the entertainment and music show At Black Peter's (Pri Črnem Petru), and the 15th season of the satirical show This Week With Jure Godler (Ta teden z Juretom Godlerjem). Before the parliamentary elections, the political talk show Slovenia Chooses with Valentina Plaskan (Slovenija izbira z Valentino Plaskan) began airing. Also in the same year, the entertainment quiz show Counting The Years with Klemen Bučan (Leta štejejo s Klemnom Bučanom) started, in which contestants guess the age of previously unknown people, along with the reality show Married at First Sight (Poroka na prvi pogled) and its companion commentary show Married at Second Sight (Poroka na drugi pogled). In May 2022, the show Planet Wow (Planet Vau) experienced another change of host. This time the host became Manja Stević. In June and July, the quiz show Family Duel (Družinski dvoboj) with host Žan Papič was broadcast.

The 2nd season of the sports reality show Exatlon Slovenia (Exalton Slovenija), hosted by Jure Košir, has been running since September 2022. The satirical show This Week With Jure Godler (Ta teden z Juretom Godlerjem) returned with its 16th season, and the morning show Morning On The Planet (Jutro na Planetu) also entered a new season with Anja Markovič becoming the editor of the latter. In November 2022, there were changes in the management of the latter show. Taiji Tokuhisa left the show Morning On The Planet (Jutro na Planetu) and was replaced by Igor Krmelj, the previous host of the news show Planet 18. With Krmelj's departure from the morning program, Miran Tišič, who had previously served as the show's editor, took over the role of news anchor.

In January 2023, the continuation of the broadcast of the quiz show Millionaire (Milijonar) with Jure Godler began, and in February of the same year, the premiere season of the Slovenian version of the quiz show Wheel of Fortune (Kolo sreče), hosted by Klemen Bučan and Nataša Naneva, also began, along with the second season of the dating show Married at First Sight (Poroka na prvi pogled) and the 17th season of the satirical show This Week With Jure Godler (Ta teden z Juretom Godlerjem). In May, a new cooking show, Fish, Duck, Crab (Riba, Raca, Rak), began airing, featuring famous Slovenians participating in the show. In the fall of 2023, the second season of the Slovenian version of the quiz show Wheel Of Fortune (Kolo sreče) was broadcast, as well as the continuation of the show This Week With Jure Godler (Ta teden z Juretom Godlerjem), whose 19th season began in the spring of 2024. May 2024 brought the third season of the Slovenian version of the quiz show Wheel Of Fortune (Kolo sreče), and in September of the same year the reality show The Biggest Loser Slovenia (The Biggest Loser Slovenija) returned, this time under the name Life On The Scale (Življenje na tehtnici), the 20th season of the satirical show This Week With Jure Godler (Ta teden z Juretom Godlerjem) and the second season of the cooking show Fish, Duck, Crab (Riba, Raca, Rak). The talk-analytical show Power Hour (Ura moči) returned with a new host, Luka Svetina.

According to 2020 data, Planet TV employs 42 people.

=== Ownership ===
Planet TV was founded by Telekom Slovenije and the Greek media company Antenna Group, with Antenna becoming the majority owner with a 51% ownership stake, Telekom Slovenije, through its subsidiary TSmedia, is a minority owner with a 49% stake. In February 2013, the publisher of Planet TV became Antenna TV SL, d.o.o., which was 51% owned by the Greek company Antenna Group and 49% owned by TSmedia, a subsidiary of Telekom Slovenije.

In 2016, Telekom became a 66% owner of Antenna TV SL. On 20 July 2016, the District Court in Ljubljana initiated a compulsory settlement procedure against the company Antenna TV SL at the proposal of the minority owner of the company. At the end of 2019, the forced settlement was concluded with a decision by the International Chamber of Commerce. Telekom Slovenije, by taking over the 34% ownership stake previously held by Antenna, in exchange for a settlement of 17.6 million euros, became the sole owner of Antenna TV SL, after which the company was renamed Planet TV, televižska dejvodina, d.o.o. The total amount of Telekom Slovenije's settlement with Antenna (according to the Swiss arbitration court ruling) amounted to almost €23 million.

Until January 2020, Planet TV was looking for a business partner who would take over the minority, 49% ownership stake, and from January 2020, a new majority owner who would implement the takeover by recapitalizing the company. Despite cost reductions, the company's net loss in 2019 increased from €3.8 million to €8.7 million, and at the end of the financial year, a total of over €20 million in negative capital was achieved, the company is said to owe around €30 million to its owner, Telekom Slovenije. The deadline for the recapitalization and sale was set for 30 June 2020. According to calculations by the newspaper Delo, Telekom Slovenije has allocated a total of €80 million to the company since the establishment of Planet TV.

In October 2020, the Hungarian television company TV2 Group became the 100% owner of Planet TV (through a 100% owned subsidiary) by purchasing it from Telekom Slovenije, owned by Hungarian entrepreneur Jozsef Vida (who is affiliated with the ruling Fidesz party there). The purchase price was €5 million. Telekom reportedly received several offers from several potential buyers, of which TV2's offer was reportedly the highest, but the latter is also said to include Telekom's commitment to continue advertising on Planet TV and other business benefits and financial commitments (conversion of €30 million in loans, write-off of around €3 million in operating receivables and €1 million in investments in Planet TV's current operations). Shortly after the takeover, they also competed for the takeover of TSMedia (owner of the multimedia portal Siol.net), which is also a subsidiary of Telekom Slovenije.

== Broadcasting ==
Planet TV can be watched via television operators Telekom Slovenije, A1 Slovenija, Telemach, T2, all major cable operators and live via its own website. From February 2013 to July 1, 2017, it was also available to television viewers via terrestrial DVB-T technology in multiplex C. Planet TV broadcast area is Slovenia. Since 2021, Planeteka, on-demand video library, has also been established, which allowed for subsequent viewing of past and current Planet TV shows (it was discontinued in 2023).

== Logo ==
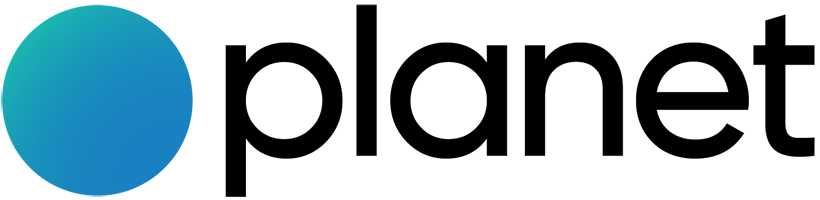
Logo of Planet TV since 2017

== See also ==
- Antenna Group
- Telekom Slovenije
- Siol.net
