= Kmetija 2024 =

- Season 14
- Presented by: Natalija Bratkovič
- No. of days: 70
- No. of castaways: 20
- Winner: Tim Novak
- Runners-up: Nik Triler; Stanislav Travnikar
- Location: Lopata, Slovenia

Release
- Original network: Pop TV
- Original release: September 2 – December 12, 2024

Additional information
- Filming dates: May 12 – July 21, 2024

Season chronology
- ← Previous; Kmetija 2023 Next → Kmetija 2026

Kmetija 2024 (The Farm 2024) is the fourteenth season of the Slovene reality television series Kmetija. The season is filmed on a new location by Lopata in Slovenia where Natalija Bratkovič once again presents and guides the contestants alongside farm mentor Nada Zorec to live on a farm as it was a century prior. The main twist this season is that new contestants are competing alongside former contestants and reality-TV contestants, all competing for the grand prize of €50,000 and the title of Kmetija 2024. The season premiered on 2 September 2024 on Pop TV. The season concluded on 12 December 2024 where Tim Novak won against Stanislav Travnikar and Nik Triler to win the grand prize and be crowned the winner of Kmetija 2024.

== Contestants ==
Amongst the contestants are couple Eva Luna Mlakar and Nejc Abram.

Contestant	Age on entry	Residence	Individual Stage	Teams Formations	Switched Teams	Unification	Entered	Exited	Season/Notability	Status	Finish
Nejc Abram	23	Jesenice	Farmer				Day 1	Day 5	New	1st Evicted; 1st Jury Member; Day 5	20th
Eva Luna Mlakar	23	Koper	Farmer				Day 1	Day 10	Sanjski moški 2022	Quit; Day 10	19th
Polona Kranjc	22	Domžale	Farmer				Day 1	Day 10	Kmetija 2021	2nd Evicted; 2nd Jury Member; Day 10	18th
Jasmin Cerić	29	Kočevje	Farmer				Day 1	Day 15	Big Brother 2016	3rd Evicted; 3rd Jury Member; Day 15	17th
Laura Beranič	26	Miklavž na Dravskem Polju	Farmer	Orange Team			Day 1	Day 25	Sanjski moški 2021	4th Evicted; 4th Jury Member; Day 25	16th
Igor Mikič	37	Ljubljana	Farmer	Orange Team			Day 1	Day 30	Exatlon Slovenija 2021	5th Evicted; Day 30	15th
Nuša Šebjanič	18	Jesenice	Farmer	Blue Team	Blue Team		Day 1	Day 35	New	6th Evicted; 5th Jury Member; Day 35	14th
Boris Vidović	27	Ljubljana	Farmer	Orange Team	Orange Team		Day 1	Day 40	Exatlon Slovenija 2022	7th Evicted; 6th Jury Member; Day 40	13th
Marcel Verbič	25	Grobelno	Forester	Blue Team	Orange Team	Unification	Day 3 (Note: Anja, Marcel, Tamara and Tim entered as foresters on day 3 with a mission to kidnap 3 players on the farm so they can enter the game. They were successful and entered the farm as competitors on day 20.)	Day 45	Kmetija 2023	8th Evicted; Day 45	12th
Maja Triler	33	Ljubljana	Farmer	Orange Team	Orange Team	Unification	Day 1	Day 50	Kmetija 2022	9th Evicted; Day 50	11th
Žan Hronek	25	Stoperce	Farmer	Orange Team	Orange Team	Unification	Day 1	Day 55	New	10th Evicted; Day 55	10th
Marjana Povše	64	Novo Mesto	Farmer	Orange Team	Orange Team	Unification	Day 1	Day 60	Kmetija 2019	11th Evicted; 7th Jury Member; Day 60	9th
Žiga Mohar	23	Videm	Farmer	Blue Team	Orange Team	Unification	Day 1	Day 62	New	12th Evicted; Day 62	8th
Ines Dužič	25	Rače	Farmer	Orange Team	Blue Team	Unification	Day 1	Day 65	New	13th Evicted; 8th Jury Member; Day 65	7th
Tjaša Vrečič	25	Murska Sobota	Farmer	Blue Team	Orange Team	Unification	Day 1	Day 69	Kmetija 2021	14th Evicted; Day 69	6th
Anja Malešič	30	Novo Mesto	Forester	Blue Team	Blue Team	Unification	Day 3	Day 69	Kmetija 2023	15th Evicted; Day 69	5th
Tamara Talundžić	30	Ljubljana	Forester	Blue Team	Blue Team	Unification	Day 3	Day 69	Kmetija 2023	16th Evicted; Day 69	4th
Stanislav Travnikar	39	Podgorje pri Pišecah	Farmer	Blue Team	Blue Team	Unification	Day 1	Day 70	New	2nd Runner-up; Day 70	3rd
Nik Triler	24	Ljubljana	Farmer	Orange Team	Blue Team	Unification	Day 1	Day 70	Kmetija 2018	Runner-up; Day 70	2nd
Tim Novak	23	Vransko	Forester	Blue Team	Blue Team	Unification	Day 3	Day 70	Kmetija 2023	Winner; Day 70	1st

== The game ==
Week	Head of Farm	Butlers	1st Dueler	2nd Dueler	Evicted	Finish
1	Nik	Laura, Tjaša; Žan, Žiga	Žan	Nejc	Nejc	1st Evicted; Day 5
2	Nik	Eva, Marjana; Nuša, Polona	Polona	Ines	Eva	Quit; Day 10
2	Nik	Eva, Marjana; Nuša, Polona	Polona	Ines	Polona	2nd Evicted; Day 10
3	Žiga	Boris, Nik, Stanislav, Žan	Nik	Jasmin	Jasmin	3rd Evicted; Day 15
4	Igor	Marjana, Nik, Nuša, Žan	Marjana	Laura	None	Saved; Day 20 (Note: As the foresters were successful in completing their task, the elimination duel was cancelled.)
5	Tamara; Žan		~~Nuša~~ (Note: As Tamara's farm won the weekly tasks, their duelists were immune from the duel.); Ines	~~Tjaša~~; Laura	Laura	4th Evicted; Day 25
6	Ines; Tamara		Žan; ~~Marcel~~	Igor; ~~Stanislav~~	Igor	5th Evicted; Day 30
7	Maja; Tamara		Nuša; ~~Žiga~~	Ines; ~~Žan~~	Nuša	6th Evicted; Day 35
8	Maja; Tim		Žiga; ~~Nik~~	Boris; ~~Stanislav~~	Boris	7th Evicted; Day 40
9	Nik	Tjaša; Žan	Maja	Marcel	Marcel	8th Evicted; Day 45
10	Nik	Tjaša; Žan	Maja	Stanislav	Maja	9th Evicted; Day 50
11	Nik	Anja; Stanislav	Stanislav	Žan	Žan	10th Evicted; Day 55
12	Tjaša	Marjana; Žiga	Marjana	Tamara	Marjana	11th Evicted; Day 60
13	Tamara		Žiga	Anja	Žiga	12th Evicted; Day 62
14	N/A		Nik	Ines	Ines	13th Evicted; Day 65
15	Jury		Tim	Tjaša	Tjaša	14th Evicted; Day 69
15	Jury		Stanislav	Anja	Anja	15th Evicted; Day 69
15	Jury		Nik	~~Tjaša~~ (Note: As Nik won an advantage in a challenge, he was able to challenge the jury's decision and decide who he faced off in the duel.); Tamara	Tamara	16th Evicted; Day 69
15	Final Duel				Stanislav	2nd Runner-up; Day 70
15	Final Duel				Nik	Runner-up; Day 70
15	Final Duel				Tim	Winner; Day 70
