= Kmetija 2026 =

- Season 15
- Presented by: Natalija Bratkovič
- No. of days: 70
- No. of castaways: 19
- Winner: Aleksandra April
- Runner-up: Jan Zore
- Location: Lopata, Slovenia

Release
- Original network: Pop TV
- Original release: February 2 – May 28, 2026

Season chronology
- ← Previous; Kmetija 2024 Next → Kmetija 2027

Kmetija 2026 (The Farm 2026) is the fifthteenth season of the Slovenian reality television series Kmetija. The season returns to the farm from last season located by Lopata in Slovenia where Natalija Bratkovič alongside farm mentor Nada Zorec brings 19 contestants to the farm, for a chance to win €50,000. The season premiered on Pop TV on 2 February 2026. The season concluded on 28 May 2026 where Aleksandra April won in the final duel against Jan Zore 2-1 to win the grand prize and become the first woman since 2017 to win Kmetija.

== Contestants ==
Amongst the contestants are former Kmetija contestants La Toya Lopez from Kmetija Slavnih, Franc Vozel from 2015 and 2021 and Igor Mikič and Nuša Šebjanič from 2024. Former Big Brother Slovenija 2015 winner Pia Filipčič, TikTok influencers Juš Čop and Mark Baržić and former Sanjski moški 2021 contestant Carmen Osovnikar.

Contestant	Age on entry	Residence	Individual Stage	Teams Formations	Kidnapped Twist	Unification	Entered	Exited	Status	Finish
Lana Pečnik	27	Ljubljana	Farmer				Day 1	Day 5	1st Evicted; 1st Jury Member; Day 5	19th
Nuša Šebjanič	19	Jesenice	Farmer				Day 1	Day 10	2nd Evicted; Day 10	18th
Dino Kurtović	23	Ljubljana	Farmer				Day 1	Day 15	3rd Evicted; Day 15	17th
Mark Baržić	18	Krško	Farmer	Red Team			Day 1	Day 25	4th Evicted; Day 25	16th
Carmen Osovnikar	43	Maribor	Intruder	Blue Team	Blue Team		Day 2	Day 30	Quit; Day 30	15th
La Toya Lopez	43	Nova Gorica	Intruder	Red Team	Red Team		Day 12	Day 35	5th Evicted; Day 35	14th
Urška Gros	30	Maribor	Farmer	Blue Team	Blue Team		Day 1	Day 40	Quit due to Pregnancy; Day 40	13th
Žiga Florjan Sedevčič	36	Šmartno pri Litiji	Farmer	Blue Team	Blue Team		Day 1	Day 40	6th Evicted; Day 40	12th
Ema Dragišić	23	Novo Mesto	Farmer	Red Team	Red Team	Unification	Day 1	Day 45	7th Evicted; 2nd Jury Member; Day 45	11th
Gregor Merdaus	27	Gornja Radgona	Farmer	Blue Team	Blue Team	Unification	Day 1	Day 50	8th Evicted; Day 50	10th
Dejan Guzej	41	Ptuj	Farmer	Blue Team	Blue Team	Unification	Day 1	Day 55	9th Evicted; 3rd Jury Member; Day 55	9th
Alenka Weiss	23	Šmarješke Toplice	Farmer	Blue Team	Blue Team	Unification	Day 1	Day 60	10th Evicted; 4th Jury Member; Day 60	8th
Juš Čop	23	Jesenice	Farmer	Red Team	Red Team	Unification	Day 1	Day 61	11th Evicted; Day 61	7th
Pia Filipčič	32	Ljubljana	Farmer	Red Team	Red Team	Unification	Day 1	Day 61	12th Evicted; 5th Jury Member; Day 61	6th
Igor Mikič	38	Ljubljana	Intruder	Red Team	Red Team	Unification	Day 7	Day 67	13th Evicted; 6th Jury Member; Day 67	5th
Žan Zore	29	Ljubljana	Farmer	Blue Team	Blue Team	Unification	Day 1	Day 68	14th Evicted; 7th Jury Member; Day 68	4th
Franc Vozel	63	Trbovlje	Farmer	Blue Team	Red Team	Unification	Day 1	Day 69	15th Evicted; Day 69	3rd
Jan Zore	29	Ljubljana	Farmer	Red Team	Red Team	Unification	Day 1	Day 70	Runner-up; Day 70	2nd
Aleksandra April	47	Koper	Farmer	Red Team	Red Team	Unification	Day 1	Day 70	Winner; Day 70	1st

== The game ==
Week	Head of Farm	Butlers	1st Dueler	2nd Dueler	Evicted	Finish
1	Ema	Gregor, Lana, Pia, Žiga	Lana	Nuša	Lana	1st Evicted; Day 5
2	Pia	Jan, Mark, Nuša, Urška	Nuša	Ema	Nuša	2nd Evicted; Day 10
3	Ema	Alenka, Dino, Urška, Žan	Dino	Žiga	Dino	3rd Evicted; Day 15
4	Alenka; La Toya (Note: Dino appointed two heads of the farm though there is only one farm (and one team.))	Aleksandra, Dejan, ~~Ema~~, Igor, Urška (Note: Due to Ema sleeping in the house, she was removed as a butler and barred from ever being head of the farm. She was replaced by Urška.)	Aleksandra; Igor	Dejan; ~~Ema~~; Urška	Aleksandra; ~~Igor~~	Picked; Day 18 (Note: For week 4, the butlers competed in a challenge to determine which two could be nominated as the next head of farm. As Aleksandra and Igor won, the rest of the contestants decided on which two would be the first head of the farm for week 5.)
5	Aleksandra; Urška	Alenka, Ema, Gregor, Mark	~~Gregor~~; Mark	~~Carmen~~ (Note: The blue team won the weekly task and therefore immune from the duel.); La Toya	Mark	4th Evicted; Day 25
6	Pia; Urška	Aleksandra, Carmen, Igor, Žan	~~Aleksandra~~; Carmen	~~La Toya~~; Žan	Carmen	Quit; Day 30
6	Pia; Urška	Aleksandra, Carmen, Igor, Žan	Žan	Gregor	Žan	Won Head of Farm; Day 30 (Note: Due to Carmen quitting before the duel, a duel was held to choose the next head of farm for the blue team.)
7	Pia; Žan	Alenka, Ema, Jan, Žiga	Ema; ~~Žiga~~	~~Dejan~~; La Toya	La Toya	5th Evicted; Day 35
8	Pia; Žan	Aleksandra, Alenka, Dejan, Igor	Dejan; ~~Igor~~	~~Juš~~; Žiga	Urška	Quit due to Pregnancy; Day 40
8	Pia; Žan	Aleksandra, Alenka, Dejan, Igor	Dejan; ~~Igor~~	~~Juš~~; Žiga	Žiga	6th Evicted; Day 40
9	Dejan	Ema; Juš	Ema	Aleksandra	Ema	7th Evicted; Day 45
10	Jan	Igor; Pia	Igor	Gregor	Gregor	8th Evicted; Day 50
11	Alenka	Aleksandra; Dejan	Dejan	Franc	Dejan	9th Evicted; Day 55
12	Aleksandra	Alenka; Juš	Alenka	Jan	Alenka	10th Evicted; Day 60
13	None		Aleksandra, Franc, Jan, Juš, Pia, Žan		Juš	11th Evicted; Day 61
13	None		Aleksandra, Franc, Jan, Juš, Pia, Žan		Pia	12th Evicted; Day 61
14	Jury {Dejan}		All		Igor	13th Evicted; Day 67
14	Jury {Dejan}		All		Žan	14th Evicted; Day 68
14	Jury {Dejan}		All		Franc	15th Evicted; Day 69
14	Final Duel				Jan	Runner-up; Day 70
14	Final Duel				Aleksandra	Winner; Day 70
