= Exatlon =

Reality competition television series/franchise

- Created by: Acun Medya
- Original work: Exathlon Brasil
- Years: 2017–present

Films and television
- Television series: Exation (independent international versions, see below)

Miscellaneous
- Genre: Sports entertainment, reality competition
- First aired: 25 September 2017

Official website
- Official website

Exatlon is a reality competition series where two teams of physically fit contestants compete against each other. The teams are composed of athletes (such as current and former Olympians), sports professionals and celebrities on one team and ordinary people with athletic ability, from all walks of life on the other team. All must have strong physical skills and sporting abilities.

Exatlon is a team-oriented competition which moves to an individual mode in its final weeks, culminating in a final round where a male and female are crowned the Exatlon champions. The format varies in certain markets where the male and female compete in the final for one of them to be crowned the Exatlon champion.

Created by Turkish production company Acun Medya, the format was first aired in Brazil on Rede Bandeirantes in 2017 and since then has been a rating success in Mexico (TV Azteca), Romania (Kanal D), Slovenia (Planet TV),Colombia (Canal RCN), US Hispanic (Telemundo), Hungary (TV2), Turkish (Netflix), Germany (Sport 1), Greece (SKAI) and Serbia (Informer TV).

== International versions ==
Legend:

Currently airing franchise
Franchise with an upcoming season
Franchise no longer aired
Status unknown

Country/Region	Local title	Network(s)	Winners	Host(s)	Prizes
Brazil	Exathlon Brasil	Band	Season 1, 2017: Marcel Stürmer	Luís Ernesto Lacombe	R$350,000
Colombia	Exatlón Colombia	RCN Televisión	Season 1, 2018: José Rodríguez	Roberto Manrique	$600,000,000
Germany	Exatlon Germany	Sport1	Season 1, 2024-25: Luca Kruger & Arleen Schüßler; Season 2, 2025-26: Jeremy Da Silva & Monic Burde; Season 3, 2026-27: Upcoming season	Current; Matthias Sandten (2–); Daniel Aminati (2ep41–); Former; Jochen Stutzky (1)	€100,000
Greece	Exathlon Greece	Skai TV	Season 1, 2025: Fanis Boletsis & Stella Andreadou	Yiorgos Karavas	€100,000
Hungary	Exatlon Hungary	TV2	Season 1, 2019: Katalin Huszti; Season 2, 2020: Gabriella Busa & Dávid Böjte; Season 3, 2020-21: Gréta Szente & Bálint Herczeg-Kis; Season 4, 2022: Gréta Szente & Dániel Jósa; Season 5, 2026: Réka Szabó & Gábor Koplányi; Season 6, 2027: Upcoming season	Current; László Palik (1–3, 5–); Former; Lehel Monoki (4)	Ft.20,000,000 (Season 1); Ft.30,000,000 (Seasons 2–4) (Note: Although the prize altogether is Ft.30,000,000, because there were two winners the prize was split in half with each winner receiving Ft.15,000,000.)
Mexico	Exatlón México	Azteca 7 (Season 1); Azteca Uno (Season 2–present)	Season 1, 2017-18: Ernesto Cázares & Macky González (Note: When the season originally aired, Ernesto was the only winner of the season whereas Macky was declared the runner-up. In the first All Star season, Macky was declared to be the co-winner of the first season after the series decided to have a male and female winner from the second season moving onwards.); Season 2, 2018-19: Aristeo Cázares & Aidee Hernández; Season 3, 2019-20: Mati Álvarez & Heliud Pulido; Season 4, 2020-21: Patricio "Pato" Araujo & Mati Álvarez; Season 5, 2021-22: Koke Guerrero & Marysol Cortés; All Star Season 1, 2022: Koke Guerrero; Season 6, 2022-23: Andrés Fierro & Liliana Hernández; All Star Season 2, 2023: Koke Guerrero; Season 7, 2023-24: Mati Álvarez & Patricio "Pato" Araujo; Season 8, 2024-25: Evelyn Guijarro & Mario "Mono" Osuna; Season 9, 2025-26: Alexis Vargas & Mati Álvarez; Season 10, 2026-27: Current season	Antonio Rosique	$2,000,000 (Seasons 1–9 and All Star seasons) (Note: Since Season 2 where they have been two winners of the show, the prize was divided in half. Each winner getting $1,000,000 as a result.) $4,000,000 (Note: The prize money is split, with each winner receiving $2,000,000)
Romania	Exatlon România	Kanal D	Season 1, 2018: Vladimir Drăghia; Season 2, 2018: Beatrice Olaru; Season 3, 2019: Andreea Arsine & Ion Surdu	Cosmin Cernat	€100,000 (Note: In Season 3, the prize was split between the two finalists; receiving €50,000 each.)
Serbia	Exatlon Srbija	Informer TV	Season 1, 2026: Marko Nikolić & Nevena Petrović; Season 2, 2026: Current season	Current; Aleksa Erski (2–); Former; Vuk Vukašinović (1)	€25,000
Slovenia	Exatlon Slovenija	Planet TV	Season 1, 2021: Franko Bajc & Marjanca Polutnik; Season 2, 2022: Karolina Siročič & Marko Špiler	Miran Ališič (1); Jure Košir (2)	€50,000
Turkey	Exatlon Challenge Türkiye	Netflix	Season 1, 2020: Barış Erdoğan & Yağmur Karabal	Orkun Işıtmak	₺250,000 (Note: As there were two winners, the main prize was divided in half with each winner taking ₺125,000 as a result.)
United States (in Spanish)	Exatlón Estados Unidos	Telemundo	Season 1, 2018: Marisela Cantú; Season 2, 2019: Valeria Sofía Rodríguez; Season 3, 2019: Alberto "El Venado" Medina; Season 4, 2020: Nate Burkhalter; Season 5, 2021: Norma Palafox & Jeyvier Cintrón; Season 6, 2022: Susana Abundiz & Briadam Herrera; All-Stars Season 1, 2022-23: Yoridan Martínez & Yamilet Peña; All-Stars Season 2, 2023-24: Susana Abundiz; All-Stars Season 3, 2024-25: Susana Abundiz & Briadam Herrera; Arena of Champions, 2025-26: Kelvin Noé Renteria & Anisa Raquel Guajardo; Arena Extrema, 2026-27: Upcoming season	Current; Frederik Oldenburg (5–); Former; Erasmo Provenza (1–4)	$200,000 (Note: From Season 5, a male winner and a female winner will receive $200,000)
