= Kmetija 2023 =

- Season 13
- Presented by: Natalija Bratkovič
- No. of days: 70
- No. of castaways: 22
- Winner: Žan Simonič
- Runners-up: Nuša Maloprav; Alen Ploj
- Location: Znojile pri Krki, Slovenia

Release
- Original network: Pop TV
- Original release: September 4 – December 21, 2023

Season chronology
- ← Previous; Kmetija 2022 Next → Kmetija 2024

Kmetija 2023 (The Farm 2023) is the thirteenth season of the Slovene reality television series Kmetija. The season returns to the Lower Carniola region of Slovenia, in the small village of Znojile pri Krki on a newly built farm. This season has 22 Slovenes compete on The Farm to try and win €50,000 and win the title of Kmetija 2023. The season concluded after 70 days on 21 December 2023 where Žan Simonič won in the final duel against Nuša Maloprav and Alen Ploj to win the grand prize and be crowned the winner of Kmetija 2023.

== Contestants ==
Amongst the contestants include, former professional footballer Alen Ploj and Vrtnice in vino commentator Nuša Maloprav.

All contestants entered on Day 1.

Contestant	Age on entry	Residence	Starting Team	Swapped Teams	Switched Teams	2nd Switched Teams	Unification	Exited	Status	Finish
Tatjana Prevolšek	27	Ptuj	Violet					Day 5	Left Competition; Day 5	22nd
Sara Bajec	36	Velenje	Violet					Day 10	1st Evicted; Day 10	21st
Gregor Fabrici	28	Lovrenc na Pohorju	Yellow					Day 15	2nd Evicted; 1st Jury Member; Day 15	20th
Luka Juren	25	Ljubljana	Yellow					Day 19 (Note: Luka arrived back on the Farm on Day 56 and stayed till the finale. He came back only as a journalist for the local farm's newspaper Kmečki list. Luka can't vote, be eliminated nor is eligible to win the grand prize.)	3rd Evicted; Day 19	19th
Nejc Hočevar	27	Ljubljana	Yellow					Day 20	4th Evicted; 2nd Jury Member; Day 20	18th
Klavdija Bertalanič	42	Rogašovci	Yellow					Day 20	5th Evicted; Day 20	17th
Anja Malešič	29	Otočec	Violet	Yellow				Day 25	6th Evicted; 3rd Jury Member; Day 25	16th
Kristijan Kozole	26	Krško	Yellow	Violet	Violet			Day 28	Left Competition; Day 28	15th
Domen Ofak	37	Ljubljana	Violet	Violet	Violet			Day 30	7th Evicted; Day 30	14th
Maja Pavlovič	23	Laško	Violet	Violet	Violet			Day 35	Quit due to Injury; Day 35	13th
Klara Vodopivec	21	Podbočje	Violet	Violet	Violet	Yellow		Day 40	8th Evicted; 4th Jury Member; Day 40	12th
Tamara Talundžić	29	Ljubljana	Violet	Violet	Violet	Violet	Unification	Day 45	9th Evicted; 5th Jury Member; Day 45	11th
Marcel Verbič	24	Šentjur	Violet	Yellow	Yellow	Yellow	Unification	Day 50	10th Evicted; Day 50	10th
Suzana Bajrić	31	Idrija	Yellow	Yellow	Violet	Violet	Unification	Day 55	11th Evicted; 6th Jury Member; Day 55	9th
Mateja Šereg	33	Šmarje pri Jelšah	Yellow	Yellow	Yellow	Yellow	Unification	Day 60	12th Evicted; 7th Jury Member; Day 60	8th
David Peter Sekirnik	27	Ljubljana	Yellow	Yellow	Yellow	Yellow	Unification	Day 63	13th Evicted; 8th Jury Member; Day 63	7th
Franc Rajšp	25	Spodnja Velka	Violet	Yellow	Yellow	Violet	Unification	Day 67	14th Evicted; 9th Jury Member; Day 67	6th
Patricija Virant	29	Ribnica	Yellow	Yellow	Yellow	Yellow	Unification	Day 69	15th Evicted; Day 69	5th
Tim Novak	22	Kapla	Yellow	Violet	Violet	Violet	Unification	Day 69	16th Evicted; Day 69	4th
Alen Ploj	31	Lenart	Violet	Violet	Violet	Violet	Unification	Day 70	2nd Runner-up; Day 70	3rd
Nuša Maloprav	23	Vransko	Yellow	Violet	Violet	Violet	Unification	Day 70	Runner-up; Day 70	2nd
Žan Simonič	26	Destrnik	Violet	Yellow	Yellow	Yellow	Unification	Day 70	Winner; Day 70	1st

== The game ==
Week	Head of Farm	Butlers	1st Dueler	2nd Dueler	Evicted	Finish
1	Klara; Tim (Note: As Heads of their respective families, Klara and Tim competed in a duel to see who would be immune for the week. Tim won the duel and was subsequently immune.)		Maja	Tatjana	Tatjana	Left Competition; Day 5
2	Franc; Kristijan (Note: Both Franc and Kristijan competed in a challenge after being elected Head of the Farm to see which of their teams would live on the farm and whose would live in the shed. Kristijan won the challenge and he and his team moved into the farm.)		Sara	Maja	Sara (Note: As Sara was failed in her task as a secret journalist to not be picked as the second duelist, she was immediately eliminated from the game.)	1st Evicted; Day 10
3	Kristijan; Tamara		Gregor	David	Gregor	2nd Evicted; Day 15
4	David; Marcel		Nejc Klara Klavdija	Kristijan Tim Domen	Luka (Note: As Luka was failed in his task as a secret journalist to not be picked as the second duelist, he was immediately eliminated from the game.)	3rd Evicted; Day 19
4	David; Marcel		Nejc Klara Klavdija	Kristijan Tim Domen	Nejc	4th Evicted; Day 20
4	David; Marcel		Nejc Klara Klavdija	Kristijan Tim Domen	Klavdija (Note: Domen, Klara, Klavdija and Tim competed in a duel to see who would return to the farm from the estate. Klavdija was the last to finish and was eliminated from the game.)	5th Evicted; Day 20
5	Marcel; Nuša		Mateja	Anja	Anja	6th Evicted; Day 25
6	Mateja; Nuša		Domen	Tim	Kristijan	Left Competition; Day 28
6	Mateja; Nuša		Domen	Tim	Domen	7th Evicted; Day 30
7	Tim; Žan		Suzana	Maja	Maja	Quit due to Injury; Day 35
8	Alen; Žan		Marcel	Klara	Klara	8th Evicted; Day 40
9	Patricija (Note: From Week 9 onwards, the farm only had one head of farm as the teams were unified.)	David; Žan	David	Tamara	Tamara	9th Evicted; Day 45
10	Alen	Marcel; Suzana	Marcel	Žan	Marcel	10th Evicted; Day 50
11	Žan	Patricija; David	David	Suzana	Suzana	11th Evicted; Day 55
12	David	Tim; Mateja	Mateja	Žan	Mateja	12th Evicted; Day 60
13	Patricija		Žan	David	David	13th Evicted; Day 63
14	None		Franc	Alen	Franc	14th Evicted; Day 67
15	Jury		Alen	Patricija	Patricija	15th Evicted; Day 69
15	Jury		Tim	Žan	Tim	16th Evicted; Day 69
15	Final Duel				Alen	2nd Runner-up; Day 70
15	Final Duel				Nuša	Runner-up; Day 70
15	Final Duel				Žan	Winner; Day 70
