= Aristidis Soiledis =

Greek former footballer

Aris Soiledis
- Soiledis in 2025

Personal information
- Full name: Aristidis Soiledis
- Date of birth: 8 February 1991 (age 35)
- Place of birth: Thebes, Greece
- Height: 1.81 m (5 ft 11 1/2 in)
- Position: Left-back

Youth career
- 2001–2004: Thiva
- 2004–2008: Olympiacos

Senior career*
Years	Team	Apps	(Gls)
2008–2011	Olympiacos	3	(0)
2010	→ OFI (loan)	1	(0)
2011	→ Levadiakos (loan)	9	(0)
2011–2013	Doxa Drama	40	(2)
2013–2014	Niki Volos	26	(0)
2014–2016	AEK Athens	30	(1)
2016–2017	Omonia	20	(0)
2017–2018	Kerkyra	11	(0)
2018–2019	Botoșani	24	(0)
2019–2021	FCSB	16	(1)
Total		180	(4)

International career^{‡}
2010–2012	Greece U21	13	(1)
- * Club domestic league appearances and goals as of 01:23, 29 September 2020 (UTC). ‡ National team caps and goals as of 31 December 2012

Aristidis "Aris" Soiledis (Greek: Αριστείδης "Άρης" Σοϊλέδης; born 8 February 1991) is a Greek former footballer who played as a left-back.

== Club career ==
Soiledis started his career football career at Olympiacos. He made his first team debut in Super League against Levadeiakos during the 2008–2009 season coming as a substitution for Sebastian Leto. Acknowledging his potential and in order to gain much needed experience, the team soon loaned him for two successive seasons to OFI and Levadiakos. On 31 August 2011, Olympiacos announced the release of the player, who did not succeed to gain sufficient time with the first team. After his release from Olympiacos he signed a two-year contract with Doxa Drama playing in Football League. On 1 August 2013 the 22-year-old midfielder signed a 1+1-year contract with "blue white" in Football League aiming the accession to Super League.

On 7 June 2014, Soiledis signed a three-year deal with AEK Athens. On 6 July 2016, he mutually solved his contract with AEK, having 41 appearances (2 goals, 5 assists) in all competitions. On 7 July 2016, he signed a contract with Cypriot club Omonia. On 15 July 2017 he returned to the Super League joining Kerkyra on a one-year contract.

On 19 July 2018, Soiledis signed a year contract with Romanian Liga I club FC Botoșani. In the summer of 2019, Liga I club FCSB announced the signing of the Greek defender for a €75.000 transfer fee, but according to various reports, he has been showing signs of professional regression since he was a member of the club. He was injured for a long time, and some people from the club accused him of starting to invent diagnoses just to not play. In the beginning of 2022, the Greek press has confirmed that Soiledis has been accepted into Survivor Greece, a TV contest, and actually terminated his career with the club.

== International career ==
He appeared for the Greece national under-21 team 13 times.

== Personal life ==
In 2022 he participated and finished in the 2nd place in Survivor 9 of the worldwide reality show Survivor. At this time, he was the contestant with the higher statistics ever participated in Survivor Greece, although he was not voted to win the final prize.

In 2023, he participated at the 7th season of talent show "Just The 2 Of Us" along with singer Marianta Pieridi and placed 6th.

He was engaged to his girlfriend of seven years, journalist Maria Antona, until their break-up in early 2024.

In August 2025 it was announced that he will participate at the first season of the competitive reality show Exatlon Greece. He came fourth in the men's division.

== Career statistics ==
=== Club ===
Statistics accurate as of match played 27 September 2020.

Club	Season	League			Cup		Europe		Other		Total	
Club	Season	Division	Apps	Goals	Apps	Goals	Apps	Goals	Apps	Goals	Apps	Goals
Olympiacos	2007–08	Super League Greece	0	0	0	0	0	0	1	0	1	0
Olympiacos	2008–09	Super League Greece	1	0	0	0	0	0	–		1	0
Olympiacos	2009–10	Super League Greece	2	0	1	0	0	0	–		3	0
Olympiacos	Total		3	0	1	0	0	0	1	0	5	0
OFI Crete (loan)	2010–11	Football League Greece	1	0	2	0	–		–		3	0
Levadiakos (loan)	2010–11	Football League Greece	9	0	–		–		–		9	0
Doxa Drama	2011–12	Super League Greece	17	1	2	0	–		–		19	1
Doxa Drama	2012–13	Football League Greece	23	1	1	0	–		–		24	1
Doxa Drama	Total		40	2	3	0	–	–	–	–	43	2
Niki Volos	2013–14	Football League Greece	26	0	3	0	–		–		29	0
AEK Athens	2014–15	Football League Greece	16	1	4	0	–		–		20	1
AEK Athens	2015–16	Super League Greece	14	0	7	1	–		–		21	1
AEK Athens	Total		30	1	11	1	–	–	–	–	41	2
Omonia	2016–17	Cypriot First Division	20	0	0	0	1	0	–		21	0
Kerkyra	2017–18	Super League Greece	11	0	1	0	–		–		12	0
Botoșani	2018–19	Liga I	21	0	0	0	–		–		21	0
Botoșani	2019–20	Liga I	3	0	–		–		–		3	0
Botoșani	Total		24	0	0	0	–	–	–	–	24	0
FCSB	2019–20	Liga I	15	1	1	0	4	0	–		20	1
FCSB	2020–21	Liga I	1	0	0	0	1	0	0	0	2	0
Career total			180	4	22	1	6	0	1	0	208	5

== Honours ==
Olympiacos

- Super League Greece: 2007–08, 2008–09
- Greek Cup: 2007–08, 2008–09
- Greek Super Cup: 2007

Niki Volos

- Football League: 2014

AEK Athens

- Football League: 2015 (South Group)
- Greek Cup: 2016

FCSB

- Cupa României: 2019–20
