= Exatlón Estados Unidos =

American television series

- Genre: Reality competition
- Based on: Exatlon
- Presented by: Erasmo Provenza; Frederik Oldenburg
- Country of origin: United States
- Original language: Spanish
- No. of seasons: 10
- No. of episodes: 986

Production
- Executive producer: Fidel Duran
- Running time: 90 minutes

Original release
- Network: Telemundo
- Release: July 18, 2018 – present

Exatlon Estados Unidos is an American reality competition television series that premiered on Telemundo on July 18, 2018. It is a Spanish-language adaptation of the Exatlon format. The show follows a group of athletes facing off in physical and mental challenges. It was hosted by Erasmo Provenza from its inception until the fourth season. Frederik Oldenburg replaced Provenza starting with the fifth season.

In May 2025, the series was renewed for a tenth season that premiered on December 2, 2025. In May 2026, the series was renewed for an eleventh season.

== Format ==
The show consists of a group of athletes competing against each other through a series of obstacle courses for the grand prize of US$200,000. Each season begins with the athletes divided into two teams, Team Famous and Team Contenders. The final eight to ten athletes then compete individually to become the champion of Exatlon.

== Series overview ==
Teams color key
Contestant from Team Famous	Contestant from Team Contenders

List of Exatlón Estados Unidos seasons
Season	Episodes	Originally aired		Contestants	Winner(s)		Runner(s)-up		Ref.
Season	Episodes	First aired	Last aired	Contestants	Winner(s)		Runner(s)-up		Ref.
1	90	July 16, 2018	November 4, 2018	31	Marisela Cantú		Kenny Ochoa		
2	95	January 21, 2019	May 12, 2019	27	Valeria Sofía Rodríguez		Jacobo García		
3	83	August 19, 2019	November 24, 2019	26	Alberto "El Venado" Medina		Shaila Perez		
4	144	January 20, 2020	October 12, 2020	33	Nate Burkhalter		Alondra "Nona" González		
5	178	January 26, 2021	August 23, 2021	42	Norma Palafox	Jeyvier Cintrón	Nathalia Sanchez	Kelvin Noé Rentería	
6	94	January 17, 2022	May 9, 2022	32	Susana Abundiz	Briadam Herrera	Isabela Arcila	Mateo Gonzáles	
7 (Note: Also known as Exatlón Estados Unidos: Edición Mundial for its first 42 episodes and Exatlón Estados Unidos: All Stars for the last 49 episodes.)	91	October 3, 2022	January 16, 2023	39	Yoridan Martínez	Yamilet Peña	Jeyvier Cintrón	Caterine Ibargüen	
8 (Note: Also known as Exatlón Estados Unidos: All Stars)	100	September 26, 2023	January 22, 2024	30	Susana Abundiz		Kelvin Noé Rentería		
9	47	December 10, 2024	February 3, 2025	24	Susana Abundiz	Briadam Herrera	Anisa Guajardo	Jeyvier Cintrón	
10 (Note: Also known as Exatlón Estados Unidos: Arena de Campeones)	64	December 2, 2025	February 16, 2026	20	Kelvin Noé Rentería	Anisa Guajardo	Dan Pastrana	Wilmarie Negrón	
