= Exatlon Slovenija 2021 =

- Season 1
- Presented by: Miran Ališič
- No. of days: 67
- No. of castaways: 26
- Winners: Franko Bajc; Marjanca Polutnik
- Runners-up: Samo Petje; Vanja Štembergar
- Location: Las Terrenas, Dominican Republic

Release
- Original network: Planet TV
- Original release: September 6 – December 3, 2021

Season chronology
- Next → 2022

Exatlon Slovenija 2021 is the first season of the Slovenian reality television series Exatlon Slovenija. The season is filmed in Las Terrenas in the Dominican Republic where contestants compete against each other to win the grand prize of €50,000 each and be crowned the winners of Exatlon Slovenija 2021. The season is hosted by television sports journalist Miran Ališič with Tina Gaber hosting as an on-the-ground hostess. The season aired on Planet TV from 6 September to 3 December 2021 where Franko Bajc and Marjanca Polutnik won in individual challenges against Samo Petje and Vanja Štembergar respectively to win the grand prize. Franko Bajc became the first Slovenian to win multiple reality television shows.

== Contestants ==
List of Exatlon Slovenija 2021 contestants
| Contestant | Original Teams | First Intruders | Second Intruders | Third Intruders | Fourth Intruders | Merged Team | Finish |
|---|---|---|---|---|---|---|---|
| Alja Šlebnik; 20, Radlje ob Dravi | Jadran | | | | | | 1st Eliminated; Day 5 |
| Gregor Divjak; 29, Sevnica | Jadran | Jadran | | | | | 2nd Eliminated; Day 10 |
| Teja Tropan; 23, Slovenska Bistrica | | | Jadran | | | | 3rd Eliminated; Day 15 |
| Katarina Jerše; 42, Ljubljana | Jadran | Jadran | Jadran | | | | Medically evacuated Day 18 |
| Nik Korošec; 29, Ljubljana | Jadran | Jadran | Jadran | | | | 4th Eliminated; Day 20 |
| Luka Turk; 35, Radovljica | Jadran | Jadran | Jadran | Jadran | | | Medically evacuated Day 24 |
| Aleksandra Podgoršek; 20, Ljubljana; Professional Gymnast | Triglav | Triglav | Triglav | Triglav | | | 5th Eliminated; Day 25 |
| Sanja Novak; 32, Murska Sobota | Jadran | Jadran | Jadran | Jadran | Jadran | | 6th Eliminated; Day 30 |
| Kaja Casar; 22, Rakičan | | | | Jadran | Jadran | | Medically evacuated Day 35 |
| Denis Porčič Chorchyp; 41, Kranjska Gora; Kickboxer & Rapper | Triglav | Triglav | Triglav | Triglav | Triglav | | 7th Eliminated; Day 35 |
| Nives Orešnik; 30, Ljubljana; Miss Slovenia 2012; Andrei's Wife | Triglav | Triglav | Triglav | Triglav | Triglav | | Quit; Day 40 |
| Simon Blažević; 27, Koper; Mister Slovenia 2019 | | Triglav | Triglav | Triglav | Triglav | | 8th Eliminated; Day 43 |
| Noemi Jae; 30, Izola; Bar 2018 contestant | | | | Triglav | Triglav | | 9th Eliminated; Day 45 |
| Marko Knafelc; 33, Novo Mesto | | | | Jadran | Jadran | | 10th Eliminated; Day 50 |
| Žan Luka Konjar; 22, Ljubljana | | Jadran | Jadran | Jadran | Jadran | | 11th Eliminated; Day 55 |
| Pina Umek; 26, Celje; Former Professional Figure Skater | Triglav | Triglav | Triglav | Triglav | Triglav | | Medically evacuated Day 56 |
| Jan Čampa; 29, Ribnica; Personal Trainer | | | | Triglav | Triglav | | 12th Eliminated; Day 60 |
| Igor Mikič; 34, Ljubljana; Entertainment Presenter | Triglav | Triglav | Triglav | Triglav | Triglav | | 13th Eliminated; Day 62 |
| Alen Lamper; 21, Celje | Jadran | Jadran | Jadran | Jadran | Jadran | Unification | 14th Eliminated; Day 64 |
| Eva Peternelj; 26, Koper | Jadran | Jadran | Jadran | Jadran | Jadran | Unification | Medically evacuated Day 65 |
| Andrei "Thorminator" Lenart; 28, Ljubljana; Actor; Nives' Husband | Triglav | Triglav | Triglav | Triglav | Triglav | Unification | 15th Eliminated; Day 66 |
| Lara Deu; 26, Ljubljana | | | | Jadran | Jadran | Unification | 16th Eliminated; Day 66 |
| Samo Petje; 29, Metlika | | | | | Jadran | Unification | Runner-up; Day 67 |
| Vanja Štembergar; 36, Ljubljana; Preživetje v divjini contestant | | | Triglav | Triglav | Triglav | Unification | Runner-up; Day 67 |
| Franko Bajc; 26, Ajdovščina; Kmetija Winner & Survivor contestant | Triglav | Triglav | Triglav | Triglav | Triglav | Unification | Winner; Day 67 |
| Marjanca Polutnik; 25, Šentjur; Model | Triglav | Triglav | Triglav | Triglav | Triglav | Unification | Winner; Day 67 |
