= Thomaïs Emmanouilidou =

Greek rower (born 1997)

Thomais Emmanouilidou
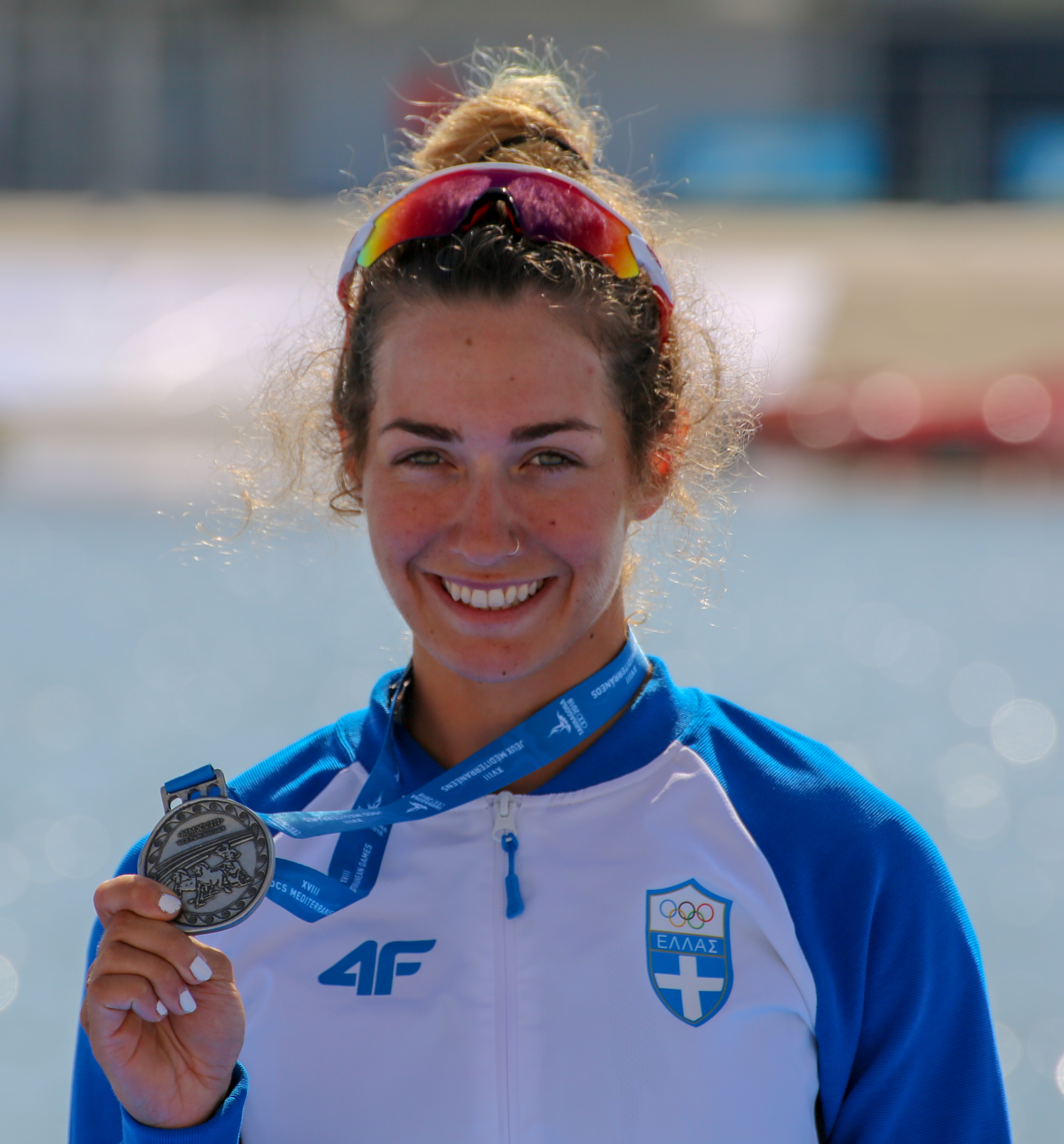

Personal information
- Nationality: Greek
- Born: 26 November 1997 (age 28) Kastoria, Greece
- Height: 1.60 m (5 ft 3 in)
- Weight: 58 kg (128 lb)

Sport
- Country: Greece
- Sport: Rowing
- Event(s): Lightweight single sculls, Lightweight double sculls
Medal record
World Rowing U23 Championships
| Bronze medal – third place | 2017 Plovdiv | BLW2x |
European Rowing U23 Championships
| Gold medal – first place | 2018 Brest | BLW2x |
Mediterranean Games
| Silver medal – second place | 2018 Tarragona | LW1x |

Thomais Emmanouilidou (Greek: Θωμαΐς Εμμανουηλίδου) is a Greek retired rower from Kastoria. She owns the single lightweight's national record. In 2017, she came 3d at the rowing world championships U23, winning the bronze medal. She also won a silver medal for Greece, at the 2018 Mediterranean Games.

== TV Appearances ==
=== TV ===
| Year | Program | Network | Part | Notes |
|---|---|---|---|---|
| 2022 | Survivor 9 | Skai TV | Self | Contestant | 4th place |
| 2025 | Exatlon Greece | Skai TV | Self | Contestant | 3rd Eliminated |
