= Exatlón Estados Unidos season 1 =

Season of television series

Exatlón Estados Unidos
- Season 1
- Hosted by: Erasmo Provenza
- No. of contestants: 31
- Winner: Marisela Cantú
- Runner-up: Kenny Ochoa
- No. of episodes: 90

Release
- Original network: Telemundo
- Original release: July 16 – November 4, 2018

Season chronology
- Next → Season 2

The first season of the American reality competition television series Exatlón Estados Unidos premiered on July 11, 2018. The season was revealed on June 18, 2018, and originally featured 20 contestants divided into two teams competing in various challenges to win the grand prize of $200,000.

The season concluded on November 4, 2018, with Marisela Cantú crowned as winner. Telemundo later renewed the show for a second season.

== Participants ==
20 original contestants were selected to compete in Exatlón Estados Unidos. Later, a total of 11 extra contestants were added. The contestants were separated into two teams, Famous and Contenders, until the individual stage.

Teams color key
Contestant from Team Famous	Contestant from Team Contenders

Contestant	Occupation	Team		Result	Ref.
Contestant	Occupation	Team	Individual	Result	Ref.
Marisela Cantú 27, Nuevo León, Mexico Mexico	Olympic Gymnast	Famous	Merge	Winner On; November 4, 2018	
Kenny Ochoa 23, Simi Valley, California Guatemala United States	Army Soldier	Contenders	Merge	Runner-Up; On; November 4, 2018	
Lorena Abreu 24, New York Dominican Republic United States	Parkour	Contenders	Merge	3rd Place; On; October 28, 2018	
Adrián Martínez 20, Charlotte, North Carolina United States Mexico	Student and Climber	Contenders	Merge	4th place On; October 28, 2018	
Daer Sánchez 33, Mexico City, Mexico Mexico	Parkour Athlete	Contenders	Merge	5th place On; October 26, 2018	
Raquel Becker 26, Mexico Mexico	Stuntman	Contenders	Merge	6th place On; October 26, 2018	
Tommy Ramos 32, Bayamón, Puerto Rico Puerto Rico	Olympic Gymnast	Famous	Merge	7th place On; October 23, 2018	
Yarishna Ayala 27, Miami, Florida Puerto Rico United States	Bodybuilder	Contenders	Merge	8th place On; October 23, 2018	
Javier Martinez 30, Los Angeles, California United States Mexico	Calisthenics Coach	Contenders		Eliminated; On; October 22, 2018	
Brenda Castro 29, Sinaloa, Mexico Mexico	Crossfit Champion	Famous		Eliminated; On; October 21, 2018	
Danee Marmolejo 25, Aguascalientes, Mexico Mexico	Parkour Athlete	Famous		Eliminated; On; October 17, 2018	
Yazmin Arroyo 30, Zapopan, Mexico Mexico	Crossfit Trainer	Famous		Eliminated; On; October 15, 2018	
Natalie Vie 31, Argentina Argentina	Fencing Champion	Contenders		Eliminated; On; October 14, 2018	
Jorge Masvidal 33, Miami, Florida Cuba Peru United States	MMA Fighter	Famous		Eliminated; On; October 10, 2018	
Jesus "Chuy" Almada 29, Navojoa, Mexico Mexico	Trainer and Boxer	Contenders		Eliminated; On; October 7, 2018	
Jennifer Salinas 36, Springfield, Virginia Bolivia United States	World Boxing Champion	Famous		Eliminated; On; October 1, 2018	
Alan Garcia 28, Mexico Mexico	Crossfit Champion	Famous		Eliminated; On; September 23, 2018	
Sebastián Caicedo 36, Cali, Colombia Colombia	Actor	Famous		Withdrawn; On; September 17, 2018	
Fernanda Piña 24, Mexico Mexico	Footballer	Famous		Eliminated; On; September 16, 2018	
Janelly Farías 28, Santa Ana, California Mexico United States	Soccer Player	Famous		Withdrawn; On; September 10, 2018	
Martibelle Payano 30, New York City, New York Dominican Republic United States	Fighter	Contenders		Eliminated; On; September 9, 2018	
Sergio Bello 30, Miami, Florida Cuba United States	Health Coach	Contenders		Eliminated; On; September 2, 2018	
Jessica Lopez 32, Denver, Colorado Venezuela United States	Artistic Gymnast	Famous		Withdrawn; On; August 31, 2018	
Leonel Manzano 33, Austin, Texas Mexico United States	Olympic Athlete	Famous		Eliminated; On; August 26, 2018	
Jimmy Lewin 42, Miami, Florida Sweden United States	Fitness Entrepreneur	Contenders		Withdrawn; On; August 20, 2018	
Michelle Lewin 32, Miami, Florida Venezuela United States	Fitness Model	Famous		Eliminated; On; August 19, 2018	
Jesus "Chuy" Almada (returned to game)		Contenders		Withdrawn; On; August 13, 2018	
William Moncada 23, Los Angeles, California Colombia United States	Water Polo Player	Famous		Eliminated; On; August 12, 2018	
Vania Bludau 27, Miami, Florida Peru United States	Model, Dancer and Reality Girl	Famous		Eliminated; On; August 5, 2018	
Érik "Goyito" Pérez 28, Monterrey, Mexico Mexico	Mixed Martial Arts	Contenders		Withdrawn; On; August 3, 2018	
Brianda Carrasco 27, Houston, Texas United States	Beauty Queen	Contenders		Eliminated; On; July 29, 2018	
Danee Marmolejo (returned to game)		Contenders		Withdrawn; On; July 29, 2018	
Miguel Montaño 26, San Diego, California Mexico United States	Coach	Contenders		Eliminated; On; July 22, 2018	

=== Elimination Table ===
Athlete	Week 1	Week 2	Week 3	Week 4	Week 5	Week 6	Week 7	Week 8	Week 9	Week 10	Week 11	Week 12	Week 13			Week 14			Week 15 (Note: From the fifteenth week onwards, the teams were dissolved and all contestants played individually.)				
Marisela	Win	Win	In	In	In	In	Win	Win	Immune	Immune	Immune	Win	Immune	Win	Immune	Immune	Sentenced	In	Immune		Immune	Win	Winner
Kenny	Sentenced	In	Win	Win	Win	Win	Sentenced	In	Win	Win	Win	In	Win	In	Win	Win	Win	Win	In	Sentenced	Sentenced	Win	Runner-Up
Lorena	In	In	Win	Win	Win	Win	In	In	Win	Win	Win	In	Win	Sentenced	Win	Win	Win	In	In	Win	Sentenced	Semifinalist	
Adrian	In	In	Win	Win	Win	Win	In	In	Win	Win	Win	Immune	Win	Immune	Win	Win	Win	Win	Immune		Immune	Semifinalist	
Daer	No Participation		Win	Win	Win	Win	Immune	In	Win	Win	Win	Sentenced	Win	In	Win	Win	Win	Win	In	Win	Eliminated		
Raquel	In	In	Win	Win	Win	Win	In	Sentenced	Win	Win	Win	In	Win	In	Win	Win	Win	In	In	Sentenced	Eliminated		
Tommy	Win	Win	In	In	In	In	Win	Win	In	In	In	Win	In	Win	In	Sentenced	In	Sentenced	In	Eliminated			
Yarishna	In	In	Win	Win	Win	Win	In	In	Win	Win	Win	In	Win	In	Win	Win	Win	In	In	Eliminated			
Javier	No Participation						Immune	Immune	Win	Win	Win	In	Win	In	Win	Win	Win	Eliminated					
Brenda	No Participation								Immune	In	Sentenced	Win	In	Win	Sentenced	In	Eliminated						
Danee	In	Withdrew	No Participation								Immune	Win	Sentenced	Win	In	Eliminated							
Yazmín	No Participation								Immune	In	In	Win	In	Win	Eliminated								
Natalie	No Participation								Win	Win	Win	In	Win	Eliminated									
Jorge	Win	Win	In	In	In	Sentenced	Win	Win	In	Sentenced	In	Win	Eliminated										
Jesus	Immune	Immune	Win	Win	Withdrew	No Participation					Win	Eliminated											
Jennifer	Win	Win	Sentenced	In	Sentenced	In	Win	Win	Sentenced	In	Eliminated												
Alan	No Participation									Eliminated													
Sebastian	Win	Win	In	In	In	In	Win	Win	In	Withdrew													
Fernanda	No Participation							Win	Eliminated														
Janelly	Win	Win	Immune	Immune	Immune	In	Win	Win	Withdrew														
Martibelle	In	Sentenced	Win	Win	Win	Win	In	Eliminated															
Sergio	No Participation				Win	Win	Eliminated																
Jessica	Win	Win	In	In	In	Immune	Withdrew																
Leo	Win	Win	In	Sentenced	In	Eliminated																	
Jimmy	No Participation			Win	Win	Withdrew																	
Michelle	No Participation			Immune	Eliminated																		
William	Win	Win	In	Eliminated																			
Vania	Win	Win	Eliminated																				
Goyito	No Part.	In	Withdrew																				
Brianda	In	Eliminated																					
Miguel	Eliminated																						

The contestant was sentenced for elimination.
The contestant was immune from elimination.
The contestant was immune from elimination due to just entering the competition.
The contestant or team won a game.
The contestant was eliminated from the competition.
The contestant was withdrawn from the competition.
