= Exathlon Greece =

- Season 1
- Presented by: Yiorgos Karavas
- No. of castaways: 20
- Winners: Fanis Boletsis & Stella Andreadou
- Runners-up: Giorgos Gioulekas & Dora Nikoli
- Location: La Romana, Dominican Republic
- No. of episodes: 30

Release
- Original network: Skai TV
- Original release: August 31 – October 10, 2025

Additional information
- Filming dates: August 22 – October 8, 2025

Exathlon Greece is the Greek version of the reality competition television series franchise Exatlon, where two teams of physically fit contestants compete against each other. The show was broadcast on Skai TV and also in Cyprus on Sigma TV.

The show was announced in May 2024 with casting call trailers. The game was in pre-production throughout the summer, but in August 2024, the producers decided against it and instead greenlit the twelfth season of Survivor, which did very poor ratings. The production and the network discussed the possibility of releasing it in January 2025, but it was again canceled.

In July 2025, the network issued a press release officially announcing the show. The production decided to cast the show with contestants from Survivor from seasons 5–12.

Model and former athlete Yiorgos Karavas was the host of the show. The show premiered on August 31, 2025 with 5 episodes per week.

The audience have no control through voting to keep a player in the game as nominees come of through their athletic performance. Each week a man and a woman leave. There are no mixed matches as one man and one woman win the title at the end.

== Contestants ==
The show started with 20 contestants (10 men and 10 women) from Survivor Greece from season 5 to 12. They weren't any additions to the cast.

Contestant	Age	Occupacion	Team	Merge	Statistics	Finish
Fanis Boletsis	29	Business Manager	Orange	Merge	67%	Winner; Episode 30
Stella Andreadou	34	Physical Teacher	Blue	Merge	61%	Winner; Episode 30
Giorgos Gioulekas	30	Businessman	Blue	Merge	53%	Runner Up; Episode 30
Dora Nikoli	48	English Teacher	Blue	Merge	48%	Runner Up; Episode 30
Daniel Nurka	28	Actor	Blue	Merge	49%	11th Eliminated; Episode 29
Vicky Peteinari	21	Model	Blue	Merge	48%	Evacuated; Episode 29
Aris Soiledis	34	Ex-Football Player	Blue	Merge	52%	10th Eliminated; Episode 27
Mairi Peteinari	21	Model	Orange	Merge	48%	9th Eliminated; Episode 27
Takis Karagounias	53	Ex-Mercenary	Orange	Merge	40%	8th Eliminated; Episode 25
Carolina Jacqueline Kalyva	35	Pilates Instructor	Blue	Merge	32%	7th Eliminated; Episode 25
Marios Priamos Ioannidis	38	TV Host	Orange	Merge	46%	6th Eliminated; Episode 24
Ioanna Tzavella	26	Athlete	Orange	Merge	43%	5th Eliminated; Episode 24
Giorgos Koromi	38	Businessman	Blue	Merge	31%	4th Eliminated; Episode 23
Stavroula Chrisaeidi	28	Interior Designer	Orange	Merge	68%	Evacuated; Episode 23
Mae Emmanouilidou	27	World Rowing champion	Orange		45%	3rd Eliminated; Episode 20
Giorgos Pilidis	25	Wrestling Champion	Blue		33%	Walked; Episode 19
Stefania Glara	24	MMA trainer	Blue		45%	2nd Eliminated; Episode 15
Giannis Alkeo Keli	32	Crossfit Trainer	Orange		43%	1st Eliminated; Episode 10
Stathis Schizas	33	Entrepreneur	Orange		60%	Evacuated; Episode 5
Evi Saltaferidou	35	Fitness Coach	Orange		66%	Evacuated; Episode 3

== Elimination Process ==
=== Elimination Challenge Nominations and Results ===
Week #	1			2			3			4	
Episodes #	1-5			6-10			11-15			16-20	
Medalion Winners	Marios		Ioanna	Giorgos G.		Stefania	Stavroula	Aris		Stella	Fanis
Men's immunity Losing Team	Blue	Blue	Orange	-	Orange	Orange	-			-	
Women's immunity Losing Team	Orange	Orange	Cancelled	Blue	-		Orange	Blue	Blue	Orange	Orange
Killer MVP	None			Giorgos P.						None	
MVP	Stella		Stavroula	Stella		Stavroula	Aris	Fanis		Aris	Stavroula
LVP Nominated	None			Giannis K.			Carolina	Mae		Mairi	
Nominated by MVP	None			Takis			Stefania			Mae	
Nominated by Team Vote	None			Marios			None			Ioanna	
Eliminated in Challenge	None			Giannis K.			Stefania			Mae	

=== Elimination Challenge Nominations and Results After Merge ===
Week #	5			6	
Episodes #	23	24	25	27	29
Men safe from Elimination	Daniel; Fanis; Marios; Takis	Aris; Fanis; Giorgos G.	Daniel; Fanis; Giorgos G.	Fanis; Giorgos G.	Fanis
Women safe from Elimination	Dora; Mairi; Stella; Vicky	Dora; Mairi; Stella	Dora; Mairi; Stella	Dora; Vicky	Dora
Men Nominees	Aris; Giorgos G. Giorgos K.	Daniel; Marios; Takis	Aris; Takis	Aris; Daniel	Daniel; Giorgos G.
Women Nominees	Carolina; Ioanna; Stavroula	Carolina; Ioanna; Vicky	Carolina; Vicky	Mairi; Stella	Stella; Vicky
Eliminated after Challenge	Giorgos K. & Stavroula*	Marios & Ioanna	Takis & Carolina	Aris & Mairi	Daniel & Vicky

- Stavroula was evacuated after hurting her ankle.

== Match Results ==
Episode			Winner	Score	Reward
Week	No.	Air date	Winner	Score	Reward
1	1	August 31, 2025	Blue	10-5	Villa
1	1	August 31, 2025	Orange	7-1	Advantage Challenge
1	2	September 1, 2025	Blue	10-8	Women's 1st Immunity
1	3	September 2, 2025	Blue	10-4	Women's 2nd Immunity
1	3	September 2, 2025	Orange	10-9	Airpods
1	4	September 3, 2025	Orange	10-5	Men's 1st Immunity
1	4	September 3, 2025	Orange	10-4	Men's 2nd Immunity
1	5	September 6, 2025	Blue	10-9	Men's 3rd Immunity
1	5	September 6, 2025	Giorikas	-	MVP Killer
2	6	September 9, 2025	Blue	7-4	Advantage Challenge
2	6	September 9, 2025	Orange	10-4	Villa
2	7	September 10, 2025	Orange	10-2	Reward
2	7	September 10, 2025	Blue	5-2	Mini Game: Communication
2	8	September 11, 2025	Orange	10-1	1st Immunity
2	8	September 11, 2025	Giorgos G.	-	Mini Game: Trip
2	9	September 12, 2025	Blue	10-7	Villa
2	9	September 12, 2025	Blue	10-7	2nd Immunity
2	10	September 13, 2025	Blue	10-9	3rd Immunity
3	11	September 15, 2025	Orange	5-3	Αdvantage Challenge
3	11	September 15, 2025	Orange	10-8	Villa
3	12	September 16, 2025	Blue	10-8	Reward
3	13	September 17, 2025	Blue	10-6	1st Immunity
3	14	September 18, 2025	Blue	10-3	Villa
3	14	September 18, 2025	Orange	10-7	2nd Immunity
3	15	September 19, 2025	Orange	10-7	3rd Immunity
4	16	September 22, 2025	Orange	10-5	Villa
4	16	September 22, 2025	Greece	10-8	Greece x Mexico
4	17	September 23, 2025	Orange	10-8	Advantage Challenge
4	18	September 24, 2025	Blue	10-7	1st Immunity
4	19	September 25, 2025	Orange	7-5	Villa
4	19	September 25, 2025	Blue	10-7	2nd Immunity
4	20	September 26, 2025	Blue	7-6	Medalion Game
5	21	September 29, 2025	Vicky	-	Advantage Challenge (Women)
5	21	September 29, 2025	Stella	-	Villa Winner
5	21	September 29, 2025	Daniel	-	Villa Winner
5	22	September 30, 2025	Fanis	-	Advantage Challenge (Men)

== Ratings ==
Official ratings are taken from AGB Hellas.

Week	Episode	Air date	Timeslot (EET)	Ratings	Viewers (in millions)	Rank		Share		Source
Week	Episode	Air date	Timeslot (EET)	Ratings	Viewers (in millions)	Daily	Weekly	Household	Adults 18-54	Source
1	1	August 31, 2025	Sunday 9:00pm	4.1%	0.409	#2	#14	13.6%	8.9%	
1	2	September 1, 2025	Monday 9:00pm	4.2%	0.423	#4	-	13.2%	9.8%	
1	3	September 2, 2025	Tuesday 9:00pm	4%	0.408	#3	-	14%	10.8%	
1	4	September 3, 2025	Wednesday 9:00pm	3.3%	0.336	-	-	10.6%	8.8%	
1	5	September 6, 2025	Saturday 9:30pm	3.2%	0.327	#6	-	12.5%	8.6%	
2	6	September 9, 2025	Tuesday 11:00pm	-	-	-	-	9.8%	9.4%	
2	7	September 10, 2025	Wednesday 9:00pm	2.8%	0.282	-	-	8.8%	6.1%	
2	8	September 11, 2025	Thursday 9:00pm	3.6%	0.359	#10	-	12.2%	10%	
2	9	September 12, 2025	Friday 11:00pm	-	-	-	-	10.8%	8.7%	
2	10	September 13, 2025	Saturday 9:00pm	3.1%	0.316	#10	-	11.2%	7.7%	
3	11	September 15, 2025	Monday 9:00pm	-	-	-	-	8.3%	7.4%	
3	12	September 16, 2025	Tuesday 9:00pm	-	-	-	-	8.1%	5.1%	
3	13	September 17, 2025	Wednesday 9:00pm	3.7%	0.369	#5		11.4%	8.3%	
3	14	September 18, 2025	Thursday 9:00pm	3.3%	0.336	-	-	10.4%	7.1%	
3	15	September 19, 2025	Friday 9:00pm	-	-	-	-	8.9%	6%	
4	16	September 22, 2025	Monday 9:00pm	-	-	-	-	6.1%	6.5%	
4	17	September 23, 2025	Tuesday 9:00pm	-	-	-	-	7%	6.1%	
4	18	September 24, 2025	Wednesday 9:00pm	-	-	-	-	7.5%	7%	
4	19	September 25, 2025	Thursday 9:00pm	-	-	-	-	7.9%	7%	
4	20	September 26, 2025	Friday 9:00pm	-	-	-	-	8.8%	6.7%	
5	21	September 29, 2025	Monday 9:00pm	-	-	-	-	8.5%	8%	
5	22	September 30, 2025	Tuesday 9:00pm	-	-	-	-	7.1%	5.8%	
5	23	October 1, 2025	Wednesday 9:00pm	-	-	-	-	7.1%	5.7%	
5	24	October 2, 2025	Thursday 9:00pm	-	-	-	-	8.2%	6.7%	
5	25	October 3, 2025	Friday 9:00pm	-	-	-	-	8.5%	5.9%	
6	26	October 6, 2025	Monday 9:00pm	-	-	-	-	7.8%	6%	SEMI - FINALS
6	27	October 7, 2025	Tuesday 9:00pm	-	-	-	-	8.7%	6.6%	SEMI - FINALS
6	28	October 8, 2025	Wednesday 9:00pm	-	-	-	-	8%	5.9%	SEMI - FINALS
6	29	October 9, 2025	Thursday 9:00pm	-	-	-	-	7.3%	4.7%	FINALS
6	30	October 10, 2025	Friday 9:00pm	-	-	-	-	9%	5.5%	FINALS
