= Andrei Lenart =

Slovenian actor

- Born: Lenart Černilogar; 20 September 1992 (age 33); Ljubljana, Slovenia
- Occupation: Actor
- Years active: 2014–present

Lenart Černilogar (born 20 September 1992) known professionally as Andrei Lenart, is a Slovenian actor. He is one of the very few from his country that managed to break into Hollywood, colaborating with people such as Matt Damon, Martin Scorsese, Christopher Nolan and Jean-Claude Van Damme.

He played in some of blockbuster movies as A Little Chaos (2014), Kingsman: The Secret Service (2014), Star Wars: The Force Awakens (2015), Canary Black (2024) and The Odyssey (2026). And in some episodes of TV series such as Wild Bill, Jack Ryan, Hotel Portofino and SAS: Rogue Heroes.

== Filmography ==
=== Film ===
| Year | Title | Role | Notes |
|---|---|---|---|
| 2014 | Tim | Primož | Slovenian musical |
| 2014 | Milk | Photographer | Short |
| 2014 | A Little Chaos | Duras Worker | |
| 2014 | Kingsman: The Secret Service | Arctic Guard | |
| 2015 | Cyclum | Tim | Short |
| 2015 | Chivalrous Times | Sir Samuel | Short |
| 2015 | Star Wars: The Force Awakens | Resistance Soldier | |
| 2016 | Strah | Ben | Slovenian short (english: Fear) |
| 2017 | Crossing Over | Evgeny Sergeyev | Australian comedy |
| 2017 | V imenu resnice | Blaž Furjan | english title: In the Name of Truth |
| 2017 | Valladesam | Andrei Blok | |
| 2019 | Lovci brez glave | Radivoj | Slovenian short (en.: Hunters with No Head) |
| 2019 | Rustland | Waterman | Slovenian short |
| 2019 | Preboj | Partisan Lovro | Slovenian film (english: Breakthrough) |
| 2022 | Predam se | Partisan commander | Slovenian short (english: I Give Up) |
| 2022 | Lana & Toni | Toni | Slovenian short |
| 2022 | 2030 | President Ahačič | Slovenian short |
| 2023 | Beyond a Mask | Mask 1 | Slovene-English short |
| 2024 | Kill 'Em All 2 | Vlad Petrović | direct-to-video |
| 2024 | Canary Black | Niklaus | |
| 2025 | Bunny-Man | William | Italian superhero film |
| 2026 | The Odyssey | Rower | |

=== Television ===
| Year | Title | Role | Notes |
|---|---|---|---|
| 2015 | Conspiracy | Soviet Submariner, journalist | English documentary (2 episodes) |
| 2016 | Usodno vino | Bizjak | Slovenian series (2 episodes); en.: Fatal Wine |
| 2016 | Da, dragi! Da, draga! | Coach | Slovenian adaption of Un gars, une fille (1 episode) |
| 2016 | 2024 | Officer 1 (as Lenart Černilogar) | British TV film |
| 2017 | Česnovi | Juan Blasich | Slovenian series (1 episode); en.: The Garlic Family |
| 2018 | Dualizem | Boštjan | Slovenian web series (4 episodes); en.: Dualism |
| 2019 | Lajf je tekma | Miha Dornik | Slovenian series (1 episode) |
| 2019 | Reka ljubezni | Officer Hočevar | Slovenian series (1 episode); en.: River of Love |
| 2019 | Wild Bill | Dimitri | 1 episode |
| 2019 | Volevo fare la rockstar | as Andrej Lenart | Italian (1 episode); en.: I Wanted to be a Rock Star |
| 2020 | Jezero | Prison officer | Slovenian series (1 episode); en.: The Lake |
| 2020 | Srečno samski | Model | Slovenian series (1 episode); en.: Happily Single |
| 2021 | Vse punce mojga brata | Handsome swimmer | Slovenian series (1 episode); en.: All My Brothers' Girlfriends |
| 2021 | Têlenovela | Primož | Slovenian series (6 episodes); en.: Telenovela |
| 2021 | Najini mostovi | Architect | Slovenian series (1 episode); en.: Our Bridges |
| 2021 | Exatlon Slovenia (season 1) | Competitor | Slovenian edition of sports reality show |
| 2022 | Half-Half | The Ex | Slovenian mini TV series |
| 2022 | Jack Ryan | Fearless T.A.O. Volkov | 1 episode |
| 2023 | FBI: International | Vlado Popov | 1 episode |
| 2024 | Explore the Miracle Hunter | Archangel Michael | Slovenian-American series (2 episodes) |
| 2024 | Hotel Portofino | Mafioso 1 | 6 episodes |
| 2024 | Hiša ljubezni | Candidate jeb. | Slovenian series; en.: House of Love |
| 2025 | SAS: Rogue Heroes | German officer, Luftwaffe radioman | 2 episodes |
| 2025 | Situationship with my Billionaire Friend | Eric | Mini TV series |
| 2025 | Falling for the Billionare CEO | Bruno Lombardi | Mini TV series |
| 2025 | Sold to the Mafia | Jonathan | Mini TV series |
| 2026 | Kylmä kausi | Sport journalist | Finnish series; en.: Cold Season |
| 2026 | Outer Banks | | Netflix series (upcoming last season) |
| 2027 | Martin Scorsese Presents: The Saints | | he will have main role in 1 of the 3 upcoming episodes |

=== Video game ===
| Year | Title | Role | Notes |
|---|---|---|---|
| 2015 | Assassin's Creed Chronicles: China | Russian guard (voice) | Canadian history computer game |
| 2016 | Assassin's Creed Chronicles: Russia | Russian guard (voice) | Canadian history computer game |
| 2025 | Battlefield 6 | Karlo Kolar (voice) | Swedish military computer game |
| 2026 | Norse: Oath of Blood | Ivarr Sveinsson "Whale Rider" | |
