= Exatlon Srbija (season 2) =

- Season 2
- Presented by: Aleksa Erski
- No. of contestants: 26
- Location: Dominican Republic

Release
- Original network: Informer TV
- Original release: 14 September 2026 – present

Season chronology
- ← Previous; Exatlon Srbija (season 1) Next → Season 3

Exatlon Srbija (season 2) is the second season of the Serbian version of Exatlon. This season sees former player Aleksa Erski hosting the show for the first time. The season began airing on 14 September 2026.

== Contestants ==
Contestants of Exatlon Srbija (season 2)
Contestant	Team	Swap	Merge	Medals	Finish
Sanja Jurošević; 35, Temerin; Fitness instructor	Plavi			0	1st eliminated Episode 5
Gazda Paja; 38, Belgrade; Rapper	Plavi	Plavi		0	2nd eliminated Episode 10
Radmila "Rada" Ðorđević; 28, Belgrade; Entrepreneur	Plavi	Crveni		0	Evacuated; Episode 15
Jelena Jovanović; 22, Niš; Personal trainer	Crveni	Crveni		0	3rd eliminated Episode 15
Mensur Ajdarpašić; 29, Belgrade/Bar, Montenegro; Fitness trainer	Plavi	Plavi		1	Ejected; Episode 19
Veljko Milićević; 26, Niš; Firefighter	Crveni	Crveni		0	4th eliminated Episode 20
Mila Ivanovski; 26, Herceg Novi, Montenegro; Tattoo artist		Crveni		0	5th eliminated Episode 25
Marko Škara; 39, Smederevo; Commercialist		Plavi		0	6th eliminated Episode 30
Sanja Filipović; 28, Sutomore, Montenegro; Obstacle course racer	Crveni	Plavi		0	7th eliminated Episode 35
Dragomir Radojević; 35, Belgrade; Radiologist	Plavi	Plavi		0	8th eliminated Episode 40
Ivana Ivanović; 31, Financial manager	Crveni	Crveni		1	9th eliminated Episode 45
Aleksandra Senić; 25, Podgorica, Montenegro; Soldier	Plavi	Plavi		1	
Anđela Pešikan; 27, Sutomore, Montenegro; Gas station attendant	Crveni	Crveni		2	
Boris Stanojević; 20, Pale, Bosnia and Herzegovina; Biathlete	Plavi	Plavi		1	
Iva Janković; 18, Kraljevo; Volleyball player	Plavi	Plavi			
Ivan "Markioli" Markioli; 34, Belgrade; DJ	Crveni	Crveni		1	
Julija Budiša; 21, Stuttgart, Germany; Fitness instructor	Plavi	Plavi			
Lana Erić; 18, Istočno Sarajevo, Bosnia and Herzegovina; Judoka	Crveni	Crveni			
Maja Jovanović; 31, Novi Sad; Serbian language teacher	Plavi	Plavi			
Mark Kinaga; 22, Subotica; Personal trainer	Crveni	Crveni		1	
Mihailo Adžić; 29, Kruševac; Water polo player	Crveni	Plavi			
Nemanja Makuljević; 32, Belgrade; ICT specialist	Plavi	Crveni			
Nevena Nedeljković; 25, Gračanica, Kosovo; Actress	Crveni	Crveni		1	
Nikola Lakić; 43, Belgrade former footballer	Crveni	Crveni			
Strahinja Jovanić; 34, Apatin; Athlete	Plavi	Plavi			
Vuk Džudović; 22, Podgorica, Montenegro; Physiotherapist	Crveni	Crveni			

== Game results ==
Episode			Winner	Score	Prize
Week	No.	Air date	Winner	Score	Prize
1	1	September 14, 2026	Crveni	10-8	Villa
1	2	September 15, 2026	Plavi	5-4	Block a player from the opposing team from competing in the next Nomination Game
1	2	September 15, 2026	Crveni	8-4	Immunity
1	3	September 16, 2026	Markioli	2/2 lives	Medal, which gives an extra life in the Elimination Duel
1	3	September 16, 2026	Crveni	8-4	Immunity
1	4	September 17, 2026	Nevena	2/2 lives	Medal, which gives an extra life in the Elimination Duel
1	4	September 17, 2026	Crveni	8-6	Immunity
1	5	September 18, 2026	Crveni	8-4	Immunity
2	6	September 21, 2026	Crveni	10-7	Villa
2	7	September 22, 2026	Crveni	5-3	Team Medal, which gives an extra life to a player within the team in the Elimination Duel
2	7	September 22, 2026	Crveni	8-3	Immunity
2	8	September 23, 2026	Plavi	5-4	Delay the start of one man and one woman by 10 seconds in the next Nomination Game
2	8	September 23, 2026	Plavi	8-4	Immunity
2	9	September 24, 2026	Plavi	5-3	Losing team had to vote for one player, who lost five points from their statistics (Nemanja)
2	9	September 24, 2026	Crveni	8-4	Immunity
2	10	September 25, 2026	Crveni	8-3	Immunity
3	11	September 28, 2026	Plavi	10-7	Villa
3	12	September 29, 2026	Mensur	0:39,44	Medal, which gives an extra life in the Elimination Duel
3	12	September 29, 2026	Plavi	8-4	Immunity
3	13	September 30, 2026	Anđela	0:48,00	Medal, which gives an extra life in the Elimination Duel
3	13	September 30, 2026	Crveni	8-2	Immunity
3	14	October 1, 2026	Crveni	5-1	The captian of the losing team had to choose one player, who had to lose five points (Iva)
3	14	October 1, 2026	Plavi	8-3	Immunity
3	15	October 2, 2026	Plavi	8-7	Immunity
4	16	October 5, 2026	Crveni	10-5	Villa
4	17	October 6, 2026	Crveni	5-3	Team Medal, which gives an extra life to a player within the team in the Elimination Duel
4	17	October 6, 2026	Plavi	8-4	Immunity
4	18	October 7, 2026	Plavi	5-4	Delay the start of one man and one woman by 10 seconds in the next Nomination Game
4	18	October 7, 2026	Crveni	8-6	Immunity
4	19	October 8, 2026	Plavi	5-4	The captian of the losing team had to chose one player, who had to lose five points (Markioli)
4	19	October 8, 2026	Plavi	8-7	Immunity
4	20	October 9, 2026	Plavi	8-2	Immunity
5	21	October 12, 2026	Crveni	10-9	Villa
5	22	October 13, 2026	Mark	-	Medal, which gives an extra life in the Elimination Duel
5	22	October 13, 2026	Crveni	8-6	Immunity
5	23	October 14, 2026	Ivana	-	Medal, which gives an extra life in the Elimination Duel
5	23	October 14, 2026	Plavi	8-4	Immunity
5	24	October 15, 2026	Crveni	5-3	The captian of the losing team had to chose one player, who had to lose five points (Sanja F.)
5	24	October 15, 2026	Plavi	8-4	Immunity
5	25	October 16, 2026	Plavi	8-7	Immunity
6	26	October 19, 2026	Crveni	10-6	Villa + Phone call with loved ones
6	27	October 20, 2026	Crveni	5-4	Team Medal, which gives an extra life to a player within the team in the Elimination Duel
6	27	October 20, 2026	Crveni	8-5	Immunity
6	28	October 21, 2026	Crveni	5-1	Repeat a duel during the next Nomination Game
6	28	October 21, 2026	Crveni	8-4	Immunity
6	29	October 23, 2026	Plavi	5-4	The captian of the losing team had to chose one player, who had to lose five points (Nemanja)
6	29	October 23, 2026	Crveni	8-7	Immunity
6	30	October 24, 2026	Crveni	8-4	Immunity
7	31	October 27, 2026	Crveni	10-8	Villa
7	32	October 29, 2026	Aleksandra	-	Medal, which gives an extra life in the Elimination Duel
7	32	October 29, 2026	Crveni	8-2	Immunity
7	33	October 31, 2026	Nemanja	-	Medal, which gives an extra life in the Elimination Duel
7	33	October 31, 2026	Plavi	8-4	Immunity
7	34	November 1, 2026	Plavi	5-4	The captian of the losing team had to chose one player, who had to lose five points (Ivana)
7	34	November 1, 2026	Crveni	8-6	Immunity
7	35	November 2, 2026	Plavi	8-7	Immunity
8	36	November 4, 2026	Plavi	10-4	Villa + Video call with loved ones
8	37	November 5, 2026	Plavi	5-2	Team Medal, which gives an extra life to a player within the team in the Elimination Duel
8	37	November 5, 2026	Plavi	10-4	Immunity + Ziplining
8	38	November 6, 2026	Crveni	10-6	Immunity
8	39	November 7, 2026	Plavi	5-4	The captian of the losing team had to chose one player, who had to lose five points (Markioli)
8	39	November 7, 2026	Crveni	8-7	Immunity
8	40	November 8, 2026	Crveni	8-3	Immunity
9	41	November 9, 2026	Crveni	10-7	Villa
9	42	November 10, 2026	Boris	-	Medal, which gives an extra life in the Elimination Duel
9	42	November 10, 2026	Crveni	8-7	Immunity
9	43	November 12, 2026	Anđela	-	Medal, which gives an extra life in the Elimination Duel
9	43	November 12, 2026	Crveni	8-6	Immunity + Tour through Santo Domingo
9	44	November 13, 2026	Plavi	5-2	The captian of the losing team had to chose one player, who had to lose five points (Ivana)
9	44	November 13, 2026	Plavi	8-5	Immunity
9	45	November 14, 2026	Crveni	8-5	Immunity

== Elimination table ==
	Team phase										
	Original	Swap									
Week #	1	2	3		4		5	6	7	8	9
Episode #	5	10	15		19	20	25	30	35	40	45
Nominated	Aleksandra, Iva, Maja, Sanja J.	Gazda Paja, Mensur, Mihailo		Anđela, Ivana, Jelena		Markioli, Veljko, Vuk	Sanja F.	Boris, Dragomir, Marko, Mihailo	Sanja F., Iva	Markioli	Iva, Julija, Maja
Nominated	Aleksandra, Iva, Maja, Sanja J.	Gazda Paja, Mensur, Mihailo		Anđela, Ivana, Jelena		Markioli, Veljko, Vuk	Ivana, Nevena, Mila	Boris, Dragomir, Marko, Mihailo	Sanja F., Iva	Mihailo, Dragomir, Strahinja	Iva, Julija, Maja
Nominated	Aleksandra, Iva, Maja, Sanja J.	Gazda Paja, Mensur, Mihailo		Anđela, Ivana, Jelena		Markioli, Veljko, Vuk	Ivana, Nevena, Mila	Boris, Dragomir, Marko, Mihailo	Lana, Ivana	Mihailo, Dragomir, Strahinja	Iva, Julija, Maja
Nominated	Aleksandra, Iva, Maja, Sanja J.	Nemanja		Iva		Dragomir	Ivana, Nevena, Mila	Boris, Dragomir, Marko, Mihailo	Lana, Ivana	Mihailo, Dragomir, Strahinja	Ivana
Eliminated	Sanja J.	Gazda Paja	Rada	Jelena	Mensur	Veljko	Mila	Marko	Sanja F.	Dragomir	Ivana
Mark	Exempt	–	–	Exempt	–	–	Exempt	–	Exempt	–	Exempt
Vuk	Exempt	–	–	Exempt	–	Saved	Exempt	–	Exempt	–	Exempt
Mihailo	Exempt	Saved	–	Exempt	–	–	Exempt	Saved	Exempt	Saved	Exempt
Markioli	Exempt	–	–	Exempt	–	Saved	Exempt	–	Exempt	Saved	Exempt
Nevena	–	Exempt	–	–	–	Exempt	Saved	Exempt	–	Exempt	–
Anđela	–	Exempt	–	Saved	–	Exempt	–	Exempt	–	Exempt	–
Lana	–	Exempt	–	–	–	Exempt	–	Exempt	Saved	Exempt	–
Nikola	Exempt	–	–	Exempt	–	–	Exempt	–	Exempt	–	Exempt
Nemanja	Exempt	Saved	–	Exempt	–	–	Exempt	–	Exempt	–	Exempt
Julija	–	Exempt	–	–	–	Exempt	–	Exempt	–	Exempt	Saved
Strahinja	Exempt	–	–	Exempt	–	–	Exempt	–	Exempt	Saved	Exempt
Iva	Saved	Exempt	–	Saved	–	Exempt	–	Exempt	Saved	Exempt	Saved
Boris	Exempt	–	–	Exempt	–	–	Exempt	Saved	Exempt	–	Exempt
Aleksandra	Saved	Exempt	–	–	–	Exempt	–	Exempt	–	Exempt	–
Maja	Saved	Exempt	–	–	–	Exempt	–	Exempt	–	Exempt	Saved
Ivana	–	Exempt	–	Saved	–	Exempt	Saved	Exempt	Saved	Exempt	Eliminated
Dragomir	Exempt	–	–	Exempt	–	Saved	Exempt	Saved	Exempt	Eliminated	
Sanja F.	–	Exempt	–	–	–	Exempt	Saved	Exempt	Eliminated		
Marko	Not in Game						Exempt	Eliminated			
Mila	Not in Game				–	Exempt	Eliminated				
Veljko	Exempt	–	–	Exempt	–	Eliminated					
Mensur	Exempt	Saved	–	Exempt	Ejected						
Jelena	–	Exempt	–	Eliminated							
Rada	–	Exempt	Evacuated								
Gazda Paja	Exempt	Eliminated									
Sanja J.	Eliminated										
