= Exatlon Slovenija 2022 =

- Season 2
- Presented by: Jure Košir
- No. of days: 63
- No. of castaways: 29
- Winners: Karolina Siročič; Marko Špiler
- Runners-up: Lina Majcen; Tim Nuč
- Location: Las Terrenas, Dominican Republic

Release
- Original network: Planet TV
- Original release: September 5 – November 25, 2022

Season chronology
- ← Previous; 2021

Exatlon Slovenija 2022 is the second and final season of the Slovenian reality television series Exatlon Slovenija. The season returns to Las Terrenas in the Dominican Republic with a new host, Jure Košir. The season consists of two teams, one consisting of ordinary civilians and the other consisting of notable athletes and reality-TV personalities. The season premiered on Planet TV on 5 September and concluded on 25 November 2022 where Karolina Siročič and Marko Špiler won in the final challenge against Lina Majcen and Tim Nuč winning the grand prize of €50,000 each and be crowned the winners of Exatlon Slovenija 2022.

List of Exatlon Slovenija 2022 contestants
Contestant	Original Teams	First Intruders	Second Intruders	Third Intruders	Fourth Intruders	Merged Team	Finish
Jaka Polak; 27, Ljubljana	Jadran						1st Eliminated; Day 5
Manca Šepetavc; 26, Litija; Former professional athlete	Triglav						Quit; Day 7
Teja Kralj; 43, Škofja Loka; Survivor Contestant	Triglav	Triglav					Medically evacuated Day 9
Tjaša Lepej; 23, Slovenj Gradec	Jadran	Jadran					Medically evacuated Day 9
Anamarija Kastelic; 22, Ljubljana; Fitness Model	Triglav	Triglav					2nd Eliminated; Day 10
Michael Lovrec; 28, Maribor; Personal trainer	Triglav	Triglav	Triglav				3rd Eliminated; Day 15
Kaja Bajda; 27, Trbovlje; Kinesiologist			Triglav				4th Eliminated; Day 20
Klemen Kopina; 25, Novo Mesto; Radio Host			Triglav				Medically evacuated Day 23
Boris Vidović; 26, Ljubljana	Jadran	Jadran	Jadran	Jadran			5th Eliminated; Day 25
Maja Zaman; 21, Novo Mesto; Acrobatics Athlete				Triglav	Triglav		Medically evacuated Day 27
Pika Miškulin; 20, Ljubljana	Jadran	Jadran	Jadran	Jadran	Jadran		6th Eliminated; Day 30
Aleš Žontar; 40, Laško			Jadran	Jadran	Jadran		7th Eliminated; Day 35
Andreja Košir; 41, Mavčiče	Jadran	Jadran	Jadran	Jadran	Jadran		8th Eliminated; Day 40
Naja Babnik; 29, Medvode; Sports Therapist					Triglav		9th Eliminated; Day 45
Angel Stratorski; 21, Nova Gorica; Student				Triglav	Triglav		10th Eliminated; Day 45
Jan Klobasa; 24, Gornja Radgona; Kmetija Winner	Triglav	Triglav	Triglav	Triglav	Triglav		Medically evacuated Day 48
Jana Selič; 42, Celje; Saleswoman				Triglav	Triglav		11th Eliminated; Day 50
Katrin Kostanjšek; 21, Ljubljana				Jadran	Jadran		12th Eliminated; Day 55
Marko Vnuk; 43, Maribor	Jadran	Jadran	Jadran	Jadran	Jadran		13th Eliminated; Day 55
Neža Simčič; 25, Razdrto				Jadran	Jadran		14th Eliminated; Day 57
Tadej Ambrožič; 30, Mirna Peč				Jadran	Jadran		15th Eliminated; Day 57
Teo Čeh; 30, Šoštanj; Professional acrobat	Triglav	Triglav	Triglav	Triglav	Triglav	Unification	16th Eliminated; Day 59
Klara Japelj; 24, Vrhnika; Personal trainer		Triglav	Triglav	Triglav	Triglav	Unification	17th Eliminated; Day 59
Luka Burja; 29, Kamnik	Jadran	Jadran	Jadran	Jadran	Jadran	Unification	18th Eliminated; Day 61
Laura Rozman; 19, Rače		Jadran	Jadran	Jadran	Jadran	Unification	19th Eliminated; Day 61
Tim Nuč; 27, Planina pri Sevnici; Acrobat	Triglav	Triglav	Triglav	Triglav	Triglav	Unification	Runner-up; Day 63
Lina Majcen; 21, Komenda; Kmetija Contestant	Triglav	Triglav	Triglav	Triglav	Triglav	Unification	Runner-up; Day 63
Marko Špiler; 32, Brežice; Mechanical Technician				Triglav	Triglav	Unification	Winner; Day 63
Karolina Siročič; 21, Ljubljana	Jadran	Jadran	Jadran	Jadran	Jadran	Unification	Winner; Day 63
