= Podgorje pri Pišecah =

- Location in Slovenia
- Coordinates: 45°59′42.99″N 15°39′46″E
- Country: Slovenia
- Traditional region: Styria
- Statistical region: Lower Sava
- Municipality: Brežice

Area
  - Total: 6.41 km^{2} (2.47 sq mi)
- Elevation: 180.7 m (593 ft)

Population (2020)
  - Total: 187
  - Density: 29.2/km^{2} (75.6/sq mi)

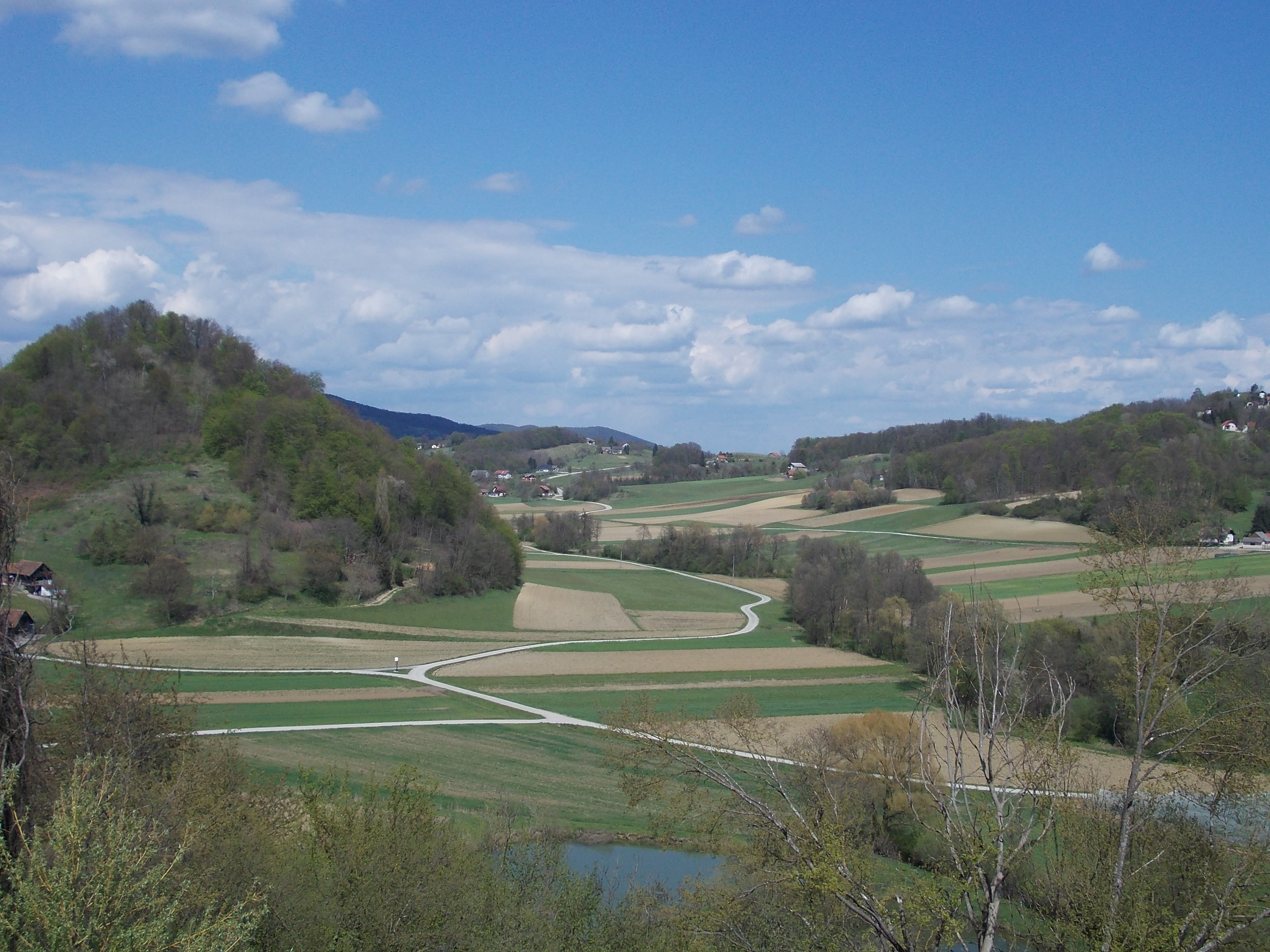

Podgorje pri Pišecah (pronounced [pɔdˈɡoːɾjɛ pɾi piˈʃeːtsax]) is a settlement in the hills west of Bizeljsko in the Municipality of Brežice in eastern Slovenia. The area is part of the traditional region of Styria. It is now included with the rest of the municipality in the Lower Sava Statistical Region.

== Geography ==
Podgorje pri Pišecah is a scattered settlement extending from the Dramlja Valley in the southeast to the Orlica Hills in the northwest, rising to the village's highest point at Big Peak (Slovene: Veliki vrh, 698 meters or 2,290 feet). It includes the hamlets of Banovec (German: Wukanitz), Brestovec, Debevec, Dramlje, Gradec, Kočni Dol, Okrog, Perdislovec (German: Perdislowetz), Vrh, Zagajca, and Zibot(i) (German: Sibot). Most of the settlement lies along the road from Pišece to Bizeljsko and on side roads extending into the vineyards.

== Name ==
The name of the settlement was changed from Podgorje to Podgorje pri Pišecah in 1953.

== History ==
During the Second World War, the Partisans operated a courier station at the Ulčnik farm in the village. In August 1944, Ustaša forces attacked the village, burning three farms and the village wine cellar.
