= Znojile pri Krki =

Znojile pri Krki Znojile (until 1953)
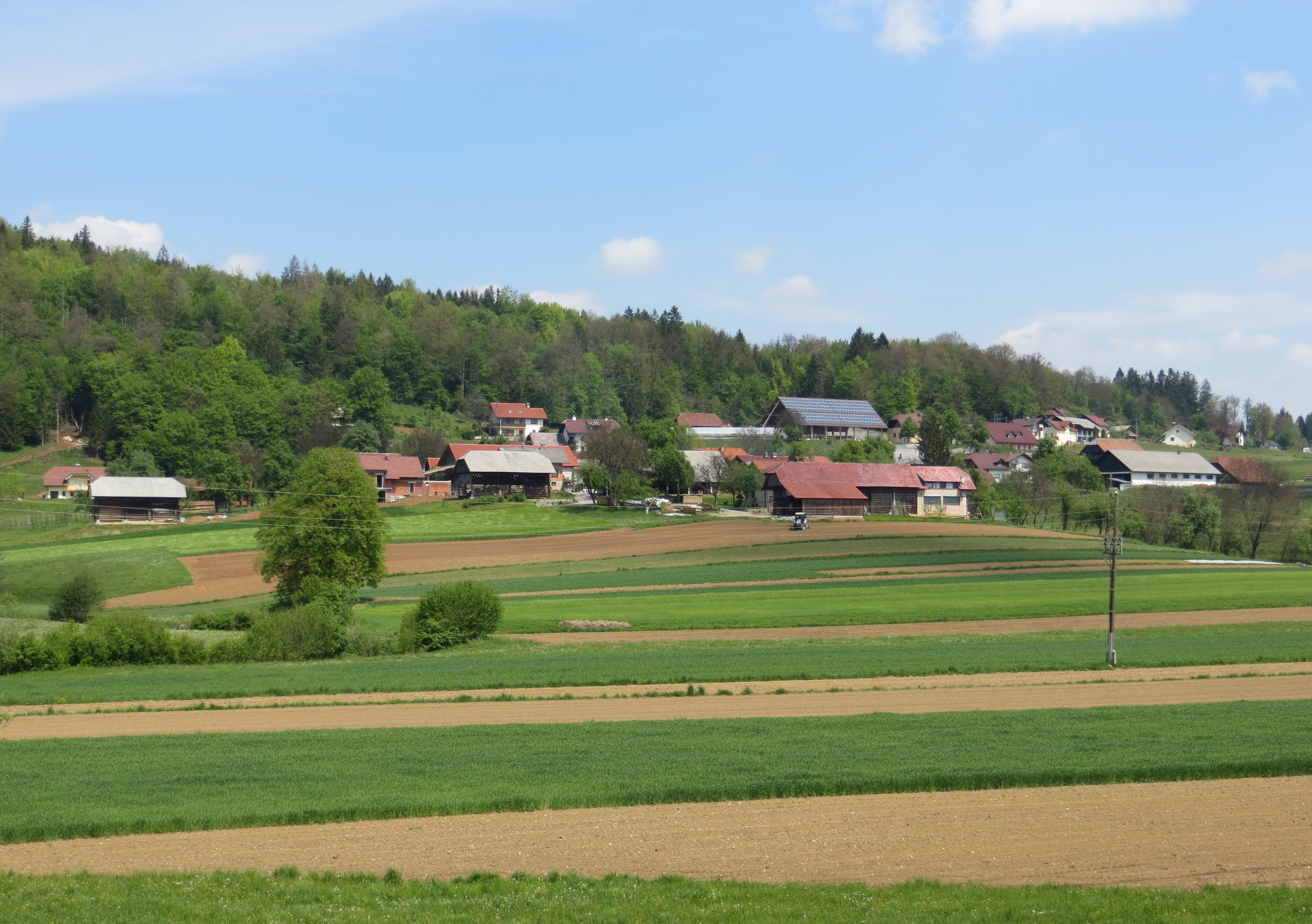

- Location in Slovenia
- Coordinates: 45°53′22.15″N 14°47′11.34″E
- Country: Slovenia
- Traditional region: Lower Carniola
- Statistical region: Central Slovenia
- Municipality: Ivančna Gorica

Area
  - Total: 1.06 km^{2} (0.41 sq mi)
- Elevation: 291.4 m (956 ft)

Population (2002)
  - Total: 112

Znojile pri Krki (pronounced [znɔˈjilɛ pɾi ˈkəɾki]) is a settlement in the Municipality of Ivančna Gorica in central Slovenia. It lies between Krka and Muljava in the historical region of Lower Carniola. The municipality is now included in the Central Slovenia Statistical Region.

== Name ==
The name of the settlement was changed from Znojile to Znojile pri Krki (literally, 'Znojile near Krka') in 1953. The name Znojile is derived from *znoji(d)lo 'sunny or sun-facing area' from the verb *znojiti 'to be warmed by the sun'. The name therefore refers to the geographical orientation of the place.

== Cultural heritage ==
A small roadside chapel-shrine in the settlement dates to the early 20th century.
