= Orkun Işıtmak =

Turkish YouTuber

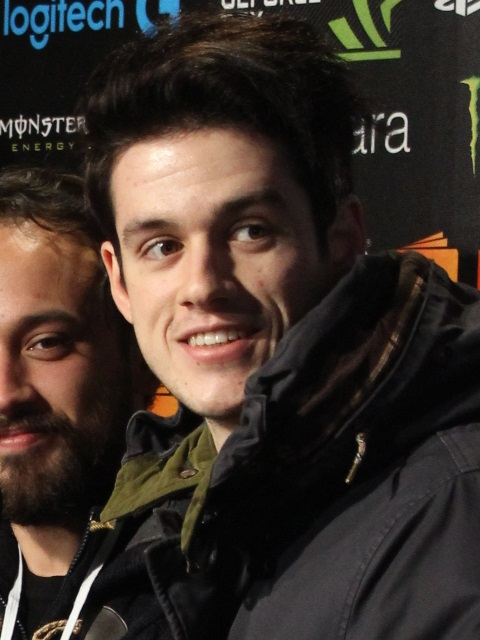
- Işıtmak in January 2017
- Born: Orkuncan Işıtmak; 8 January 1996 (age 30); İzmir, Turkey
- Spouse: Merve Yorgancılar (m. 2021)

YouTube information
- Channels: orkunisitmak; orkunv2
- Years active: 2009–present
- Genres: Gaming; vlog; entertainment
- Subscribers: 12,4 million
- Views: 5.2 billion
- Last updated: 1 March 2026
- Website: www.orkunisitmak.com

Orkuncan Işıtmak (born 8 January 1996), better known as Orkun Işıtmak, is a Turkish YouTuber known for producing a variety of videos.

== Life and career ==
After graduating from Governor Vecdi Gönül Anatolian High School, he enrolled in Istanbul University and moved to Istanbul, but later took a break from his education in order to spend more time on YouTube. Işıtmak studied at the Istanbul University School of Italian Language and Literature. He founded his YouTube channel on 18 April 2010. In 2012 he started shooting gaming and entertainment videos, but later his content diversified to include vlogs, broadcasts and interviews featuring with actors and singers, including Ece Seçkin, Murat Boz and Inna. In 2018, he had his cinematic debut with a supporting role in the movie İyi Oyun. At the 45th Golden Butterfly Awards, he was awarded as the Best YouTuber/Instagrammer.

== Youtube channel ==
As of August 2022, Işıtmak's channel is the 6th most-subscribed Turkish YouTube channel with more than 10 million subscribers.

== See also ==
- List of YouTubers
