= Las Terrenas =

Las Terrenas La Terriene
- Las Terrenas in the Dominican Republic
- Coordinates: 19°19′12″N 69°31′48″W
- Country: Dominican Republic
- Province: Samaná

Area
  - Total: 113.1 km^{2} (43.7 sq mi)

Population (2012)
  - Total: 22,664
  - Density: 200.4/km^{2} (519.0/sq mi)
- Distance to – Santo Domingo: 225 km

Las Terrenas is a town on the northeast coast of the Dominican Republic, located in the province of Samaná. It is known for its scenic landscapes, white sand beaches and clear waters. Tourism in this region is constantly growing due to investments in tourist infrastructure such as hotels, clubs, restaurants and shopping centers such as "Puerto Plaza las Terrenas".

== French inhabitants ==
The French inhabitants of Las Terrenas or Les Terrestres are one of the most influential people of the city, the French have been in Las Terrenas since its formation becoming a stable community in the city/ French is the second language of Las Terrenas.

== History ==
Las Terrenas was founded in 1946, when then-President Rafael Leonidas Trujillo ordered the rural inhabitants of Santo Domingo to resettle in the town as farmers and fishermen. Las Terrenas was then a small fishing village isolated from the rest of the country.

Over the years the village's old fishermen's cabins have been slowly transformed into bars, restaurants and shops.

Samana was a slave trade port for the British in the early seventeenth century. Today, inhabitants are a descendents of Taino, Spanish, West Indian and Africans.

The name Las Terrenas originates from the French la terrienne (the landlord).

== Population ==
According to the 2002 Population and Housing Census, the town has a total population of 13,869, of whom 6,985 were men and 6,884 women.

== Infrastructure ==
Las Terrenas is popular with Dominicans from the capital, Santo Domingo as well as foreigners. The completion of a new highway in 2012 between Santo Domingo and Santa Bárbara de Samaná has enabled easier access, and the drive takes two hours.

== Economy ==
The main economic activities of the town are tourism, commerce and fishing. In 1977 Adelphia Dane Bowen Jr. of Texas became the first foreigner to build a private home in Las Terrenas. He was Economic Officer at the United States Embassy in Santo Domingo, Dominican Republic at the time.

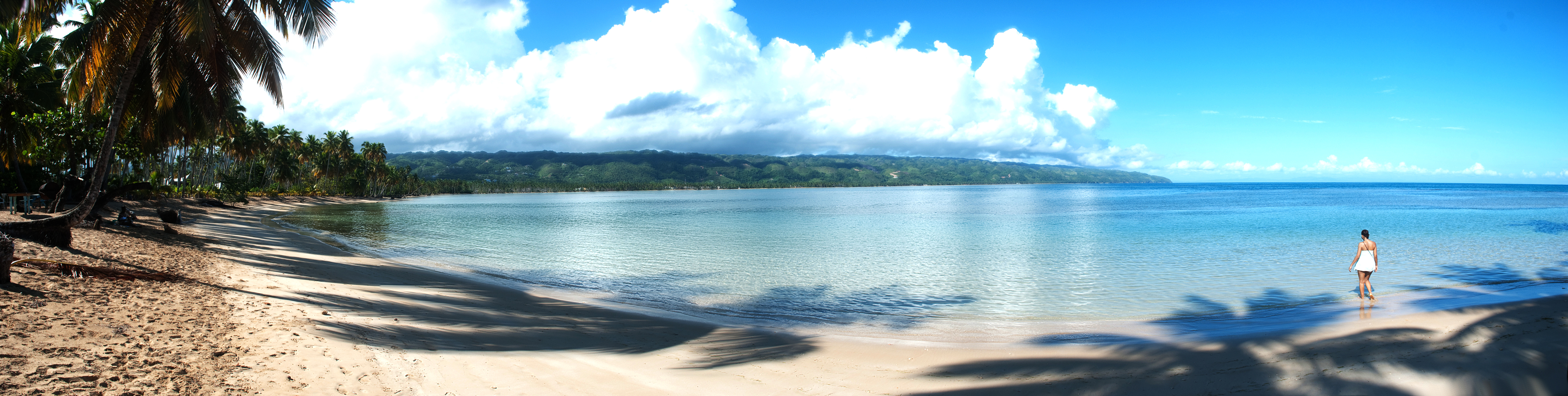
Las Terrenas Beach panoramic view

== Developments ==
Las Terrenas developed a new aqueduct in 2013. In March 2012 the town installed a new fiber optic Internet/TV/telephone system. The new Samaná El Catey International Airport is open for international flights, mainly from Europe and Canada.

== Gallery ==
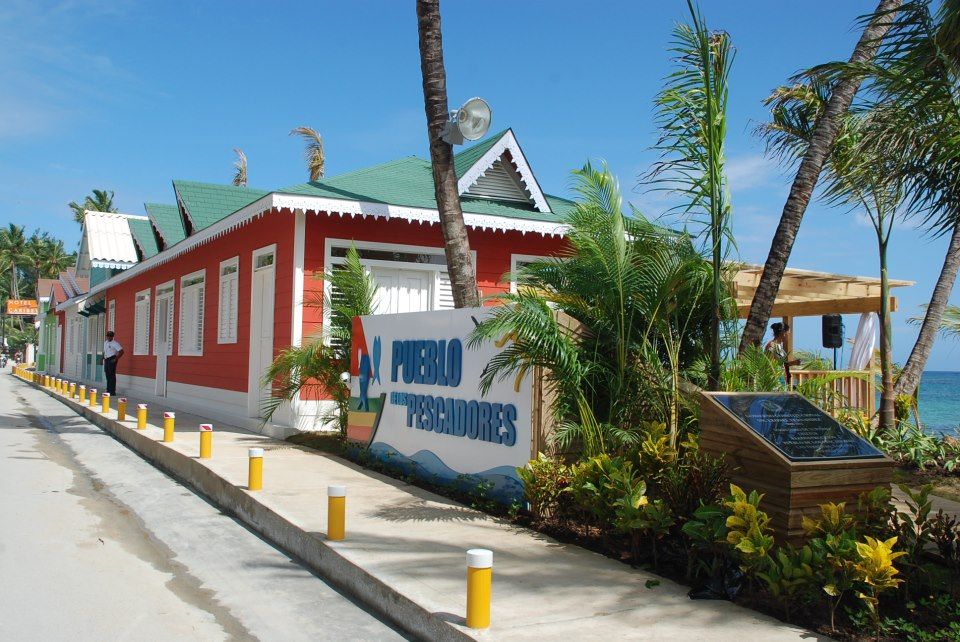
Pueblo de Pescadores lost in fire 2021

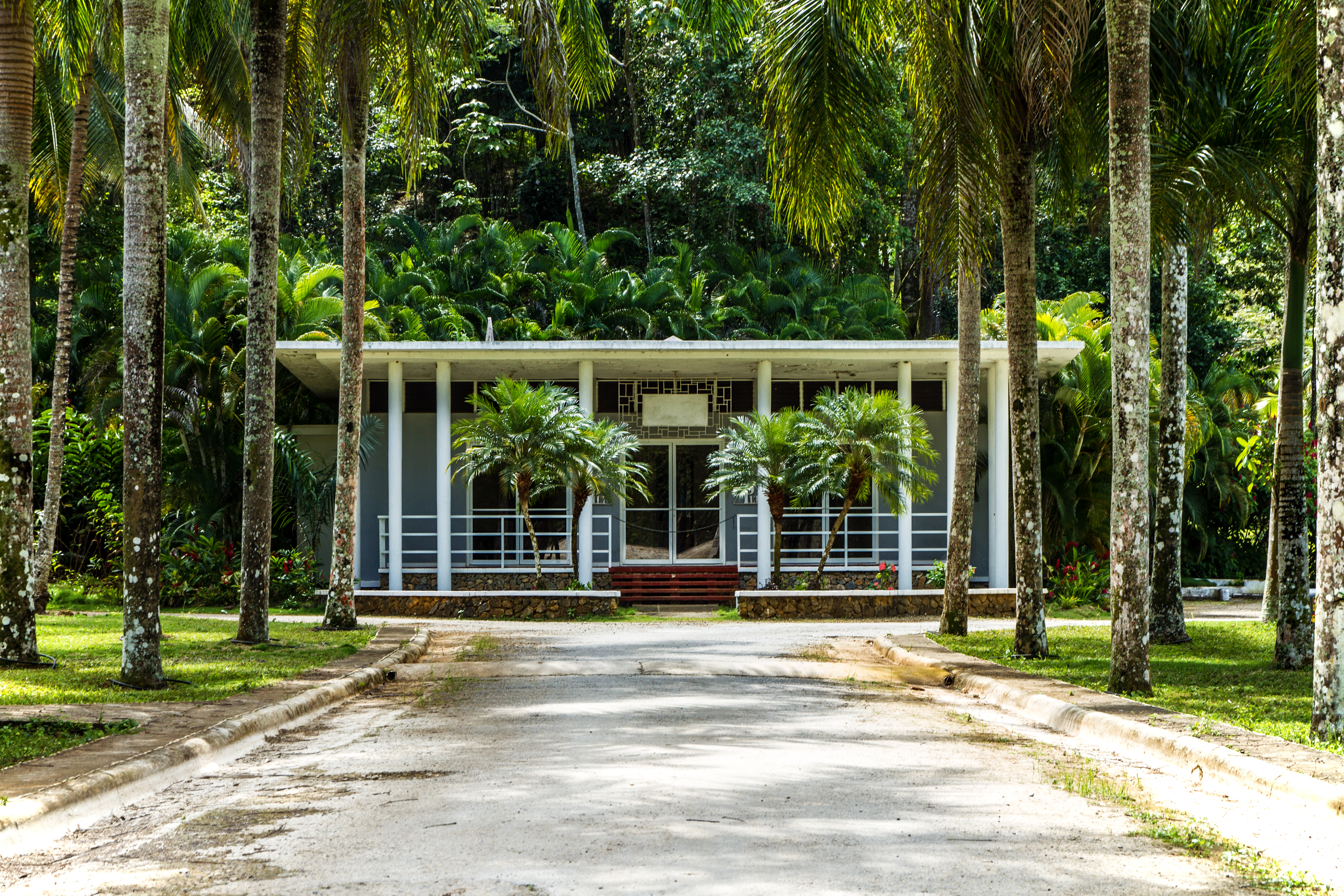
Las Terrenas Park

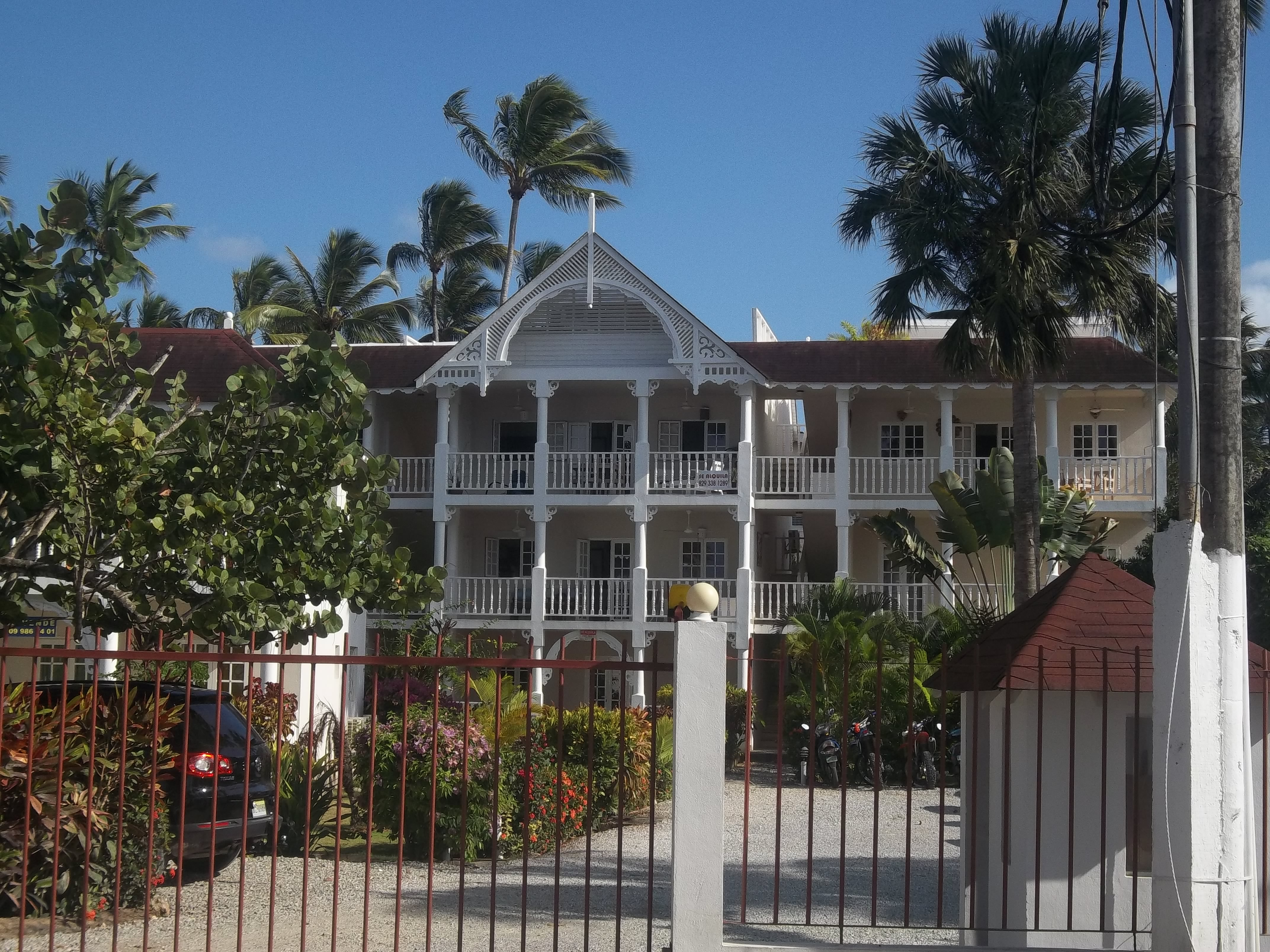
Oceanfront hotel

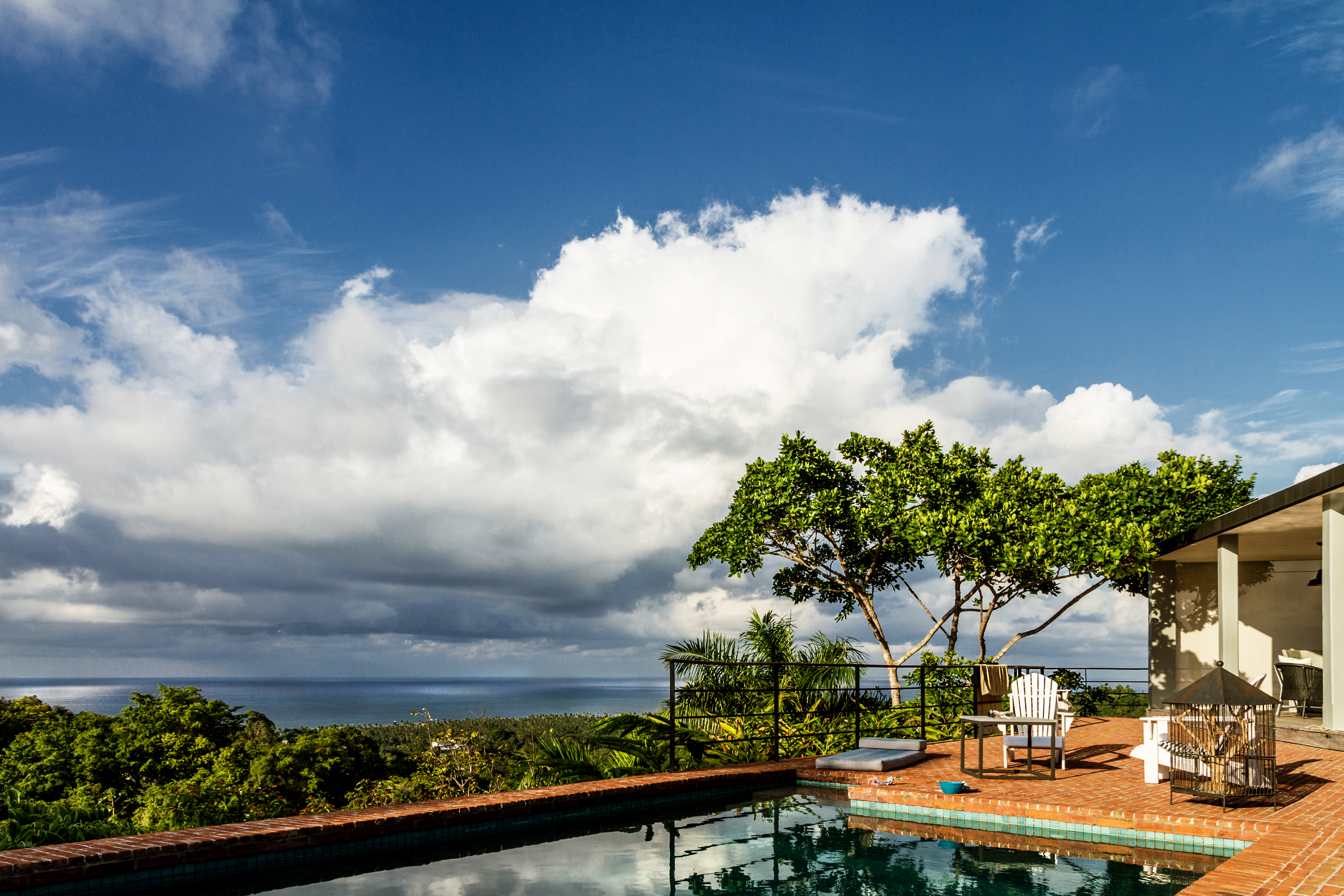
Guesthouse in Las Terrenas
