= Lopata, Žužemberk =

Lopata
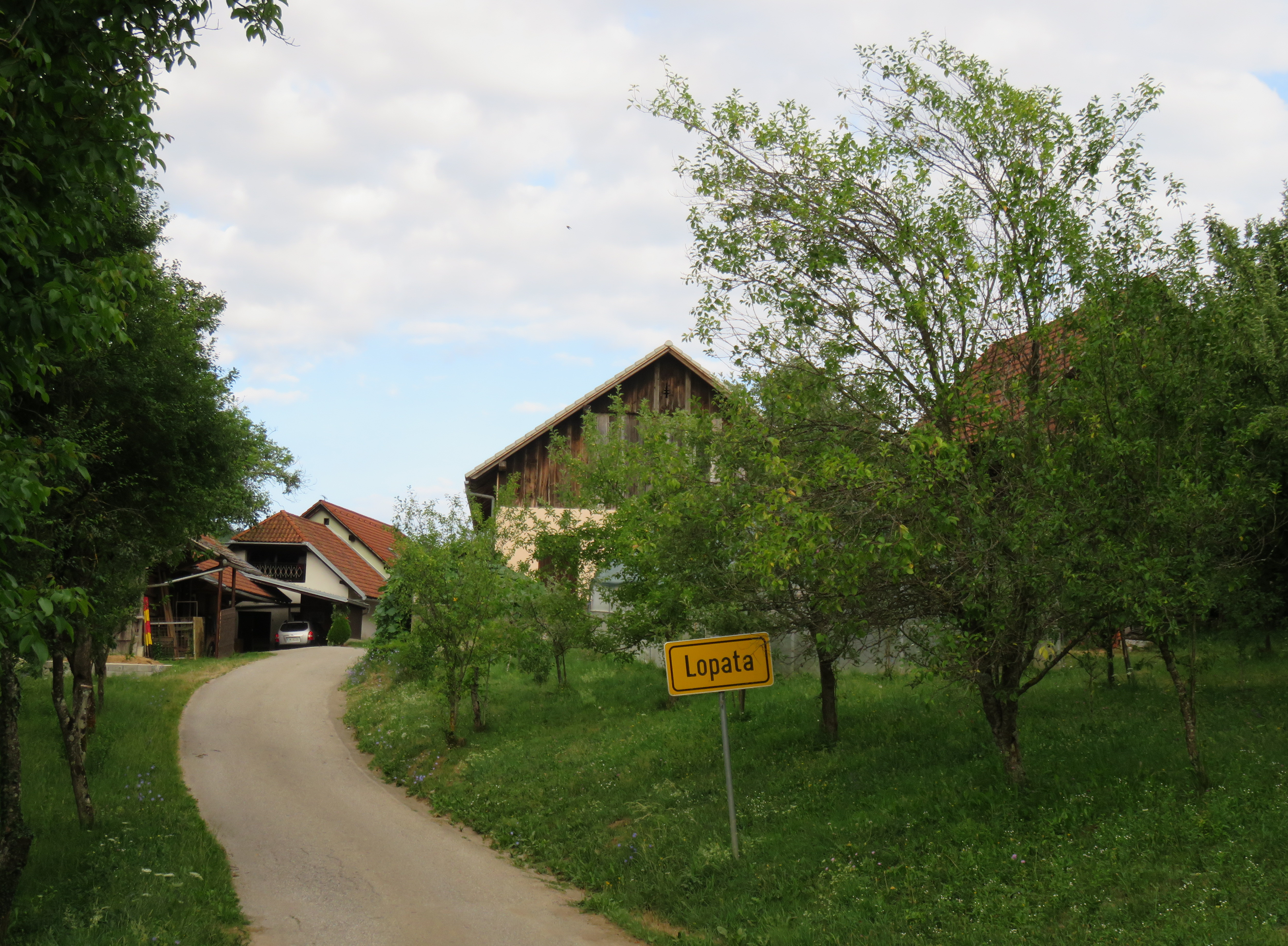

- Location in Slovenia
- Coordinates: 45°46′57.56″N 14°53′58.83″E
- Country: Slovenia
- Traditional region: Lower Carniola
- Statistical region: Southeast Slovenia
- Municipality: Žužemberk

Area
  - Total: 4.8 km^{2} (1.9 sq mi)
- Elevation: 368.2 m (1,208 ft)

Population (2002)
  - Total: 86

Lopata (pronounced [lɔˈpaːta], German: Schaufel) is a village in the hills south of Žužemberk in southeastern Slovenia. The area is part of the historical region of Lower Carniola. The Municipality of Žužemberk is now included in the Southeast Slovenia Statistical Region.

== Name ==
Lopata was attested in historical sources in 1423 as Schauffell (and as Schawfell in 1430 and Schawffell auff der Dueren Krain 'Schaufel in Dry Carniola' in 1463). These Middle High German names are believed to be translations of the Slovene name, which is derived from the common noun lopata (now 'shovel' but originally 'flat part/area'), referring to the level terrain of the village surrounded by hills.

== Church ==
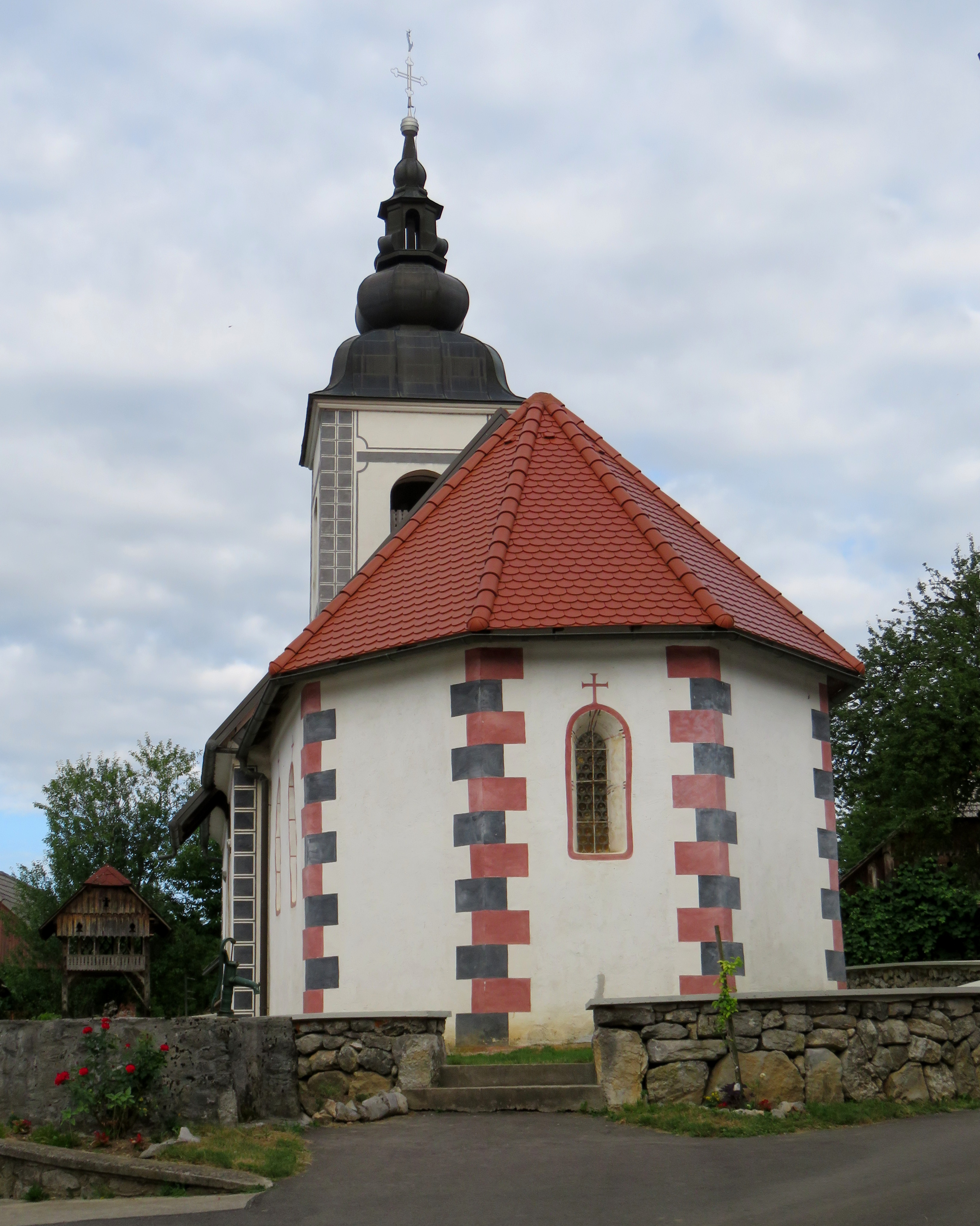
Saint Agnes's Church

The local church is dedicated to Saint Agnes (Slovene: sveta Neža) and belongs to the Parish of Hinje. It has a medieval nave with 16th-, 17th-, and 18th-century additions.
