= Laška Vas pri Štorah =

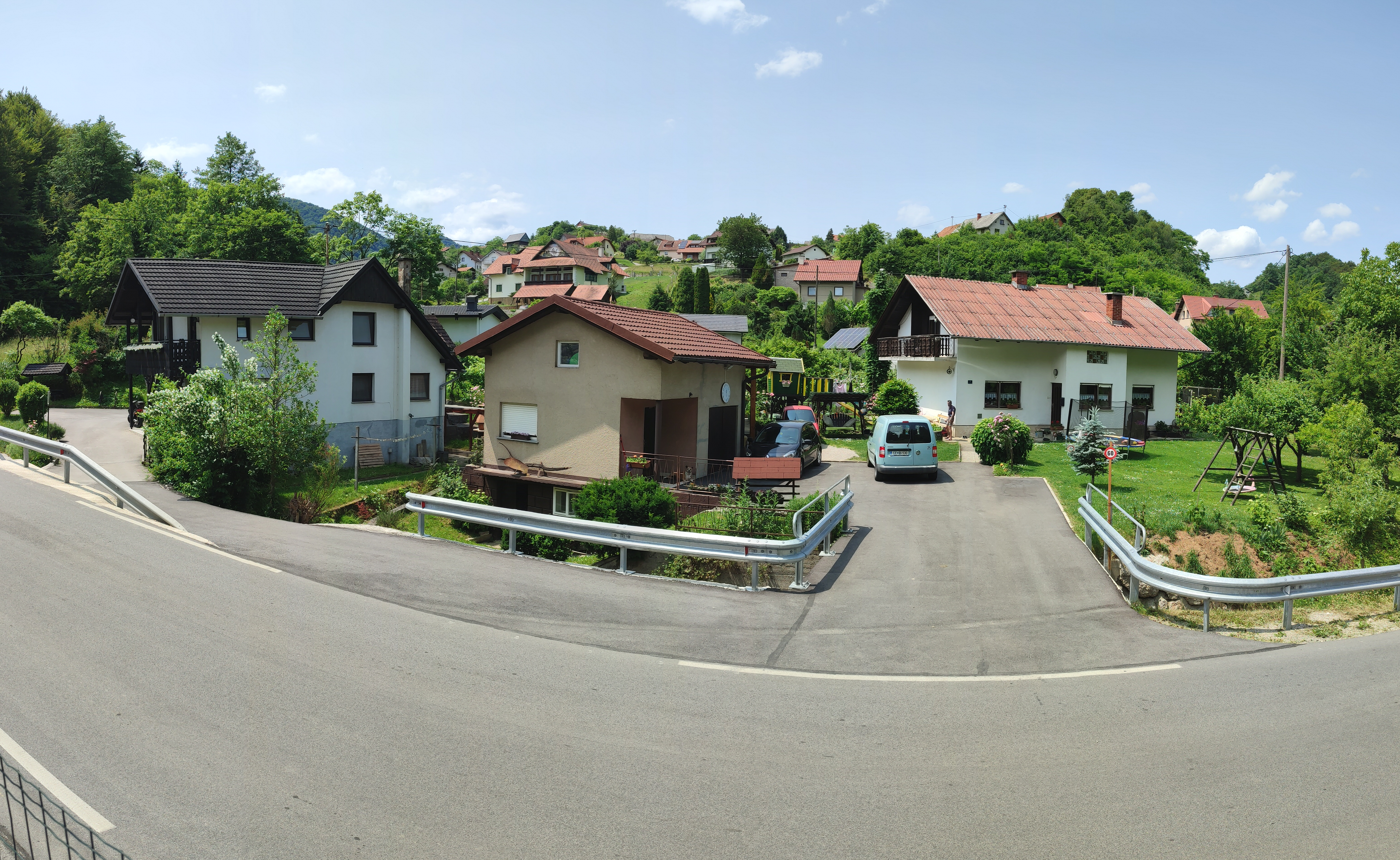

- Location in Slovenia
- Coordinates: 46°12′34.11″N 15°18′49.06″E
- Country: Slovenia
- Traditional region: Styria
- Statistical region: Savinja
- Municipality: Štore

Area
  - Total: 1.41 km^{2} (0.54 sq mi)
- Elevation: 354.7 m (1,164 ft)

Population (2002)
  - Total: 218
- Postal code: 3220

Laška Vas pri Štorah (pronounced [ˈlaːʃka ˈʋaːs pɾi ˈʃtoːɾax]; Slovene: Laška vas pri Štorah) is a small settlement in the hills immediately south of Štore in eastern Slovenia. The area is part of the traditional region of Styria. It is now included with the rest of the Municipality of Štore in the Savinja Statistical Region.

== Name ==
The name of the settlement was changed from Laška vas to Laška vas pri Štorah in 1955.

== Cultural heritage ==
Archaeological evidence near the village indicated a Migration Period burial ground.
