= Draga, Štore =

Draga
- Location in Slovenia
- Coordinates: 46°13′8.29″N 15°19′41.98″E
- Country: Slovenia
- Traditional region: Styria
- Statistical region: Savinja
- Municipality: Štore

Area
  - Total: 0.25 km^{2} (0.097 sq mi)
- Elevation: 276.7 m (908 ft)

Population (2002)
  - Total: 68
- Postal code: 3220

Draga (pronounced [ˈdɾaːɡa]) is a small settlement on the left bank of the Voglajna River in the Municipality of Štore in eastern Slovenia. The area is part of the traditional region of Styria. It is now included with the rest of the municipality in the Savinja Statistical Region.

== Name ==
The name Draga is derived from the Slovene common noun draga 'small, narrow valley', referring to the geographical location of the settlement.
