= Pečovje =

- Location in Slovenia
- Coordinates: 46°12′42″N 15°18′4.31″E
- Country: Slovenia
- Traditional region: Styria
- Statistical region: Savinja
- Municipality: Štore

Area
  - Total: 1.87 km^{2} (0.72 sq mi)
- Elevation: 382.3 m (1,254 ft)

Population (2002)
  - Total: 236
- Postal code: 3220

Pečovje (pronounced [pɛˈtʃoːu̯jɛ]) is a settlement in the Municipality of Štore in eastern Slovenia. It lies in the hills just south of Štore itself above the left bank of the Voglajna River. The area is part of the traditional region of Styria. It is now included with the rest of the municipality in the Savinja Statistical Region.

== Name ==
The name Pečovje and related place names (e.g., Pečice, Pečine, Pečke, etc.) is derived from the common noun peč 'cliff', referring to the geographical location of the settlement.
