= Prožinska Vas =

- Location in Slovenia
- Coordinates: 46°12′42.84″N 15°20′46.22″E
- Country: Slovenia
- Traditional region: Styria
- Statistical region: Savinja
- Municipality: Štore

Area
  - Total: 4.28 km^{2} (1.65 sq mi)
- Elevation: 300.2 m (985 ft)

Population (2002)
  - Total: 464
- Postal code: 3220

Prožinska Vas (pronounced [pɾɔˈʒiːnska ˈʋaːs]; Slovene: Prožinska vas) is a settlement in the Municipality of Štore in eastern Slovenia. It lies on both banks of the Voglajna River and extends southwards into the hills southeast of Štore. The area is part of the traditional region of Styria. It is now included with the rest of the municipality in the Savinja Statistical Region.
