= Glažuta =

Glažuta may refer to:

- Glažuta, Loški Potok, a settlement in the Municipality of Loški Potok, Slovenia
- Svetli Dol, a settlement in the Municipality of Štore, Slovenia, named Glažuta until 1955
- Glažuta (Sopota), a creek and tributary of the Sopota River in Slovenia
- Glažuta (Sotla), a creek and tributary of the Sotla River in Slovenia
