= Javornik, Štore =

Javornik
- Location in Slovenia
- Coordinates: 46°11′26.96″N 15°19′25.99″E
- Country: Slovenia
- Traditional region: Styria
- Statistical region: Savinja
- Municipality: Štore

Area
  - Total: 3.53 km^{2} (1.36 sq mi)
- Elevation: 579.8 m (1,902 ft)

Population (2002)
  - Total: 142
- Postal code: 3220

Javornik (pronounced [ˈjaːʋɔɾnik]) is a settlement in the Municipality of Štore in eastern Slovenia. It lies in the hills south of Štore on the road to Svetina. The area is part of the traditional region of Styria. It is now included with the rest of the municipality in the Savinja Statistical Region.
