= Kanjuce =

- Location in Slovenia
- Coordinates: 46°10′29.14″N 15°18′25.5″E
- Country: Slovenia
- Traditional region: Styria
- Statistical region: Savinja
- Municipality: Štore

Area
  - Total: 4.51 km^{2} (1.74 sq mi)
- Elevation: 699.1 m (2,294 ft)

Population (2002)
  - Total: 102
- Postal code: 3220

Kanjuce (pronounced [kaˈnjuːtsɛ]) is a settlement in the hills south of Svetina in the Municipality of Štore in eastern Slovenia. The area is part of the traditional region of Styria. It is now included with the rest of the municipality in the Savinja Statistical Region.
