= Kompole =

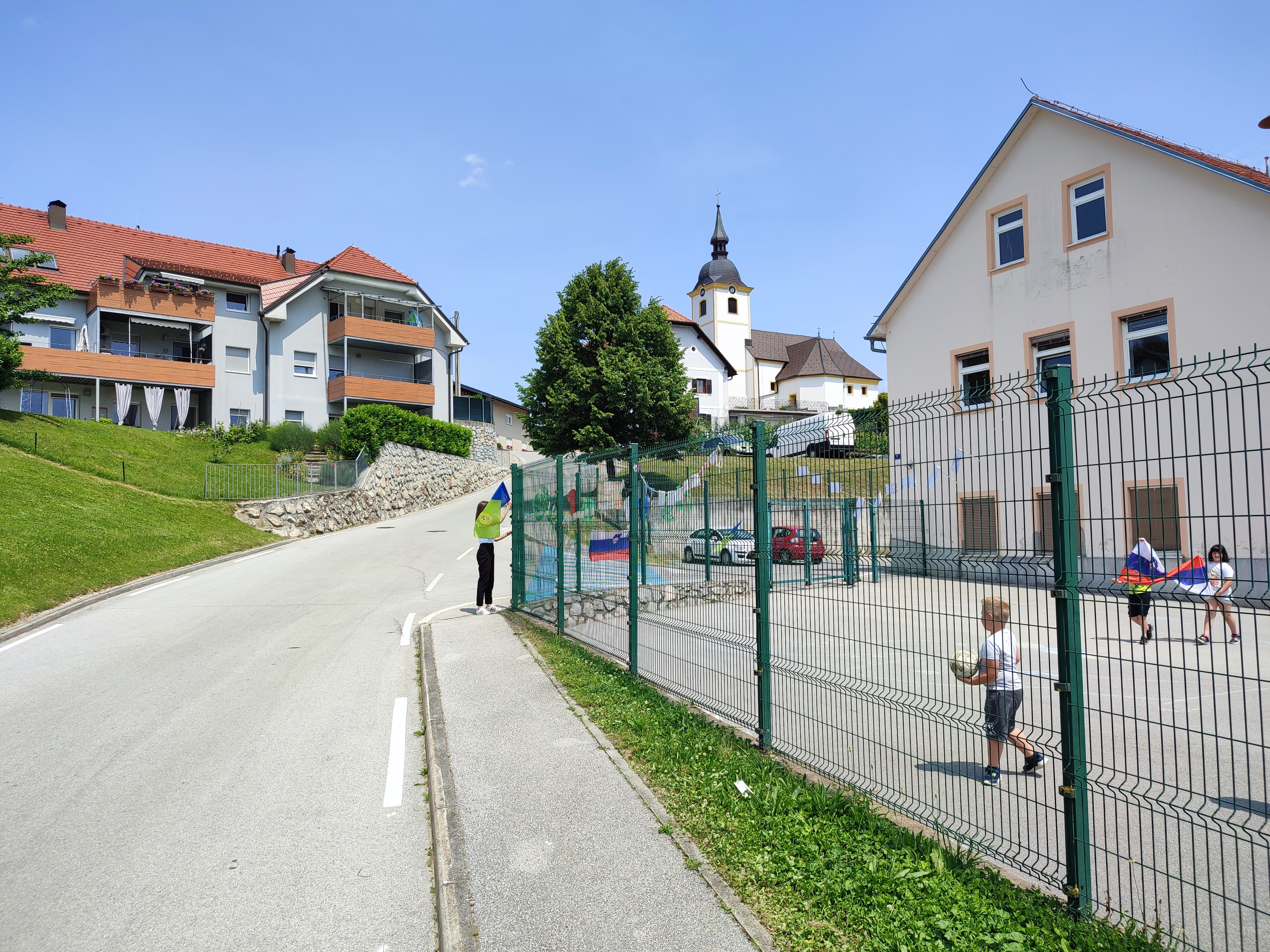

- Location in Slovenia
- Coordinates: 46°12′54.07″N 15°19′31.63″E
- Country: Slovenia
- Traditional region: Lower Styria
- Statistical region: Savinja
- Municipality: Štore

Area
  - Total: 2.15 km^{2} (0.83 sq mi)
- Elevation: 346.4 m (1,136 ft)

Population (2002)
  - Total: 510
- Postal code: 3220

Kompole (pronounced [ˈkoːmpɔlɛ]) is a settlement in the Municipality of Štore in eastern Slovenia. It lies in the hills above the left bank of the Voglajna River south of Štore. The area is part of the traditional region of Lower Styria. It is now included with the rest of the municipality in the Savinja Statistical Region.

The parish church in the settlement is dedicated to Lawrence of Rome and belongs to the Roman Catholic Diocese of Celje. It dates to the second half of the 14th century, but was extensively rebuilt in the 17th and 18th centuries.
