= Julie Martini =

Slovenian photographer (1871–1943)

- Born: Julijana Jožefa Helena Martini; January 9, 1871; Celje (then Austria-Hungary)
- Died: 25 April April 25, 1943 (aged 72); Celje
- Occupation: Photographer

Julijana Jožefa Helena Martini, also known as Julie Martini, (9 January 1871 – 25 April 1943) was a Slovenian photographer. She worked as a photographer for more than fifty-five years. In the late 19th and start of the 20th century, her studio dominated the photographic scene in Celje.

== Early life ==
She was born on 9 January 1871 into a Slovenian family in Celje. Her mother was the milliner Helena Zabukovšek from Celje, and her father was the first photographer in Celje, Josef Martini (1838–1895), from Rogatec, who was also engaged in painting. She had a younger sister and a younger brother. The family lived with her maternal grandmother and three aunts. Two days after her birth she was baptised in the Parish of St. Daniel in Celje by the then Celje vicar Franc Ogradi. Her father began teaching her photography at an early age.

== Career ==
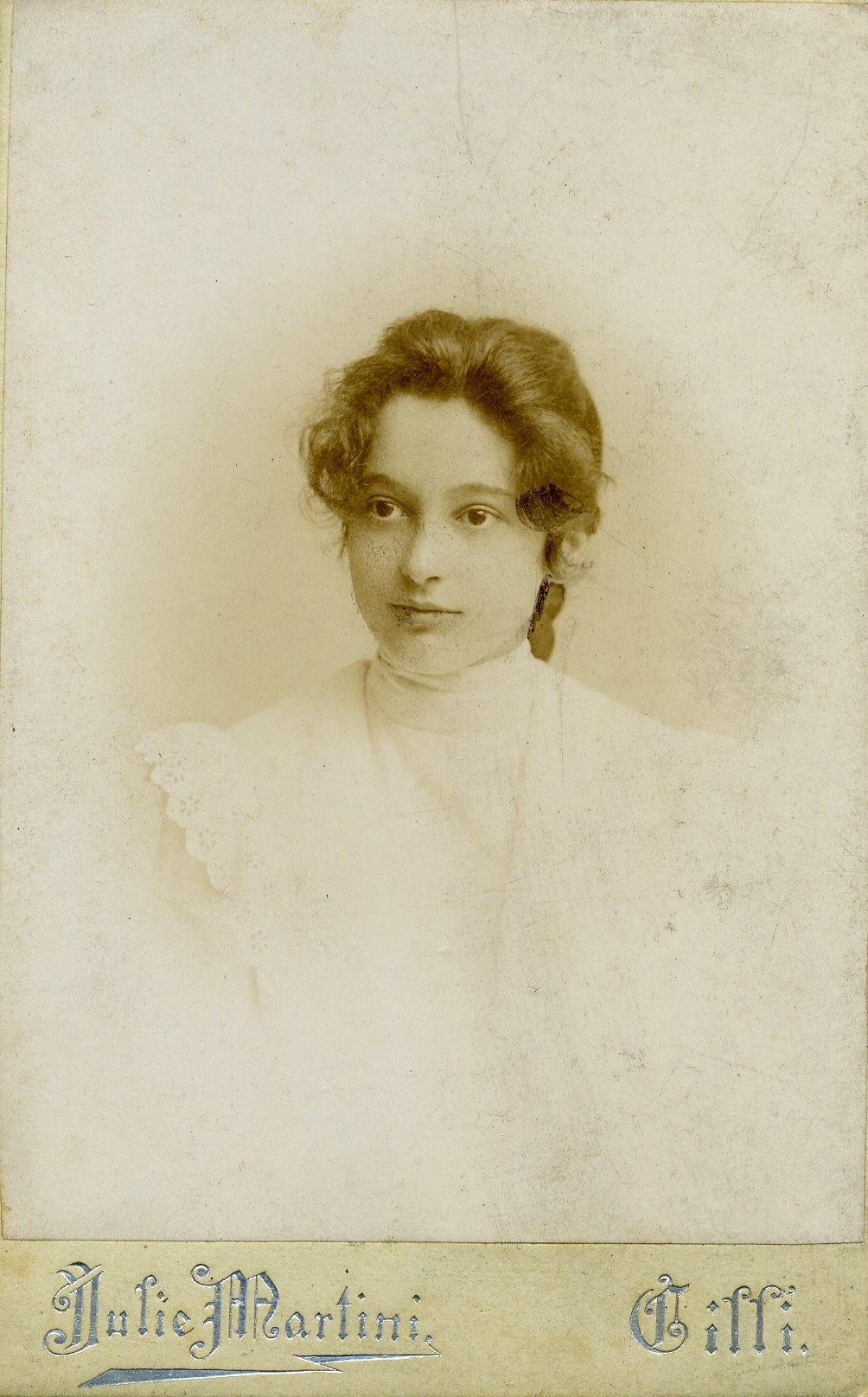
Female portrait, photographed by Julie Martini around 1900. Her name appears in silver lettering on the lower edge of the mount. Held by the NUK.

Already as a teenager she began working as a photographer in her father's studio. In 1888 she was photographed by the art collector Josip Nikolaj Sadnikar, while photographing a group at the Kurhaus spa in Kamnik.

In 1895, after her father's death, she took over his photographic studio. At first she retained her father's name in the studio title, but soon renamed it Atelier Julie Martini, which appeared in silver lettering on all her photographs. Although she also photographed outdoors, most of her work was produced in her studio, which was furnished with props and backdrops. Her specialty were portraits of children and young women, notable for their sensitivity; her subjects appear lively and responsive to the camera. Her preferred photographic technique was a soft-light effect in which the face stands out while the body and clothing fade into a misty background. She constructed her portraits around the face as a reflection of the subject's character.

After 1908 her younger brother joined her in the business. That same year they purchased a house in Celje where they established a new studio. They operated under the names Julie u. Josef Martini and later J.&J. Martini. As photographic trends changed, she had to abandon her preferred white background in favour of darker backdrops, though her influence remained visible in individual portraits. During her career she photographed many prominent citizens of Celje, including Alma Karlin. She also published postcards featuring photographs of Celje. Some of her works are preserved in the National and University Library of Slovenia, the Regional Museum of Celje, and the Museum of Recent History Celje.

== Later life and death ==
She never married and had no children. She lived in Celje throughout her life and continued working in photography until her death. She died on 25 April 1943 in Celje. After her death, her brother took over the studio, which continued operating until 1945. With more than eighty years of activity, her family thus represents the longest-standing tradition of photographers in Celje.

== Gallery of selected photographs from her studio ==
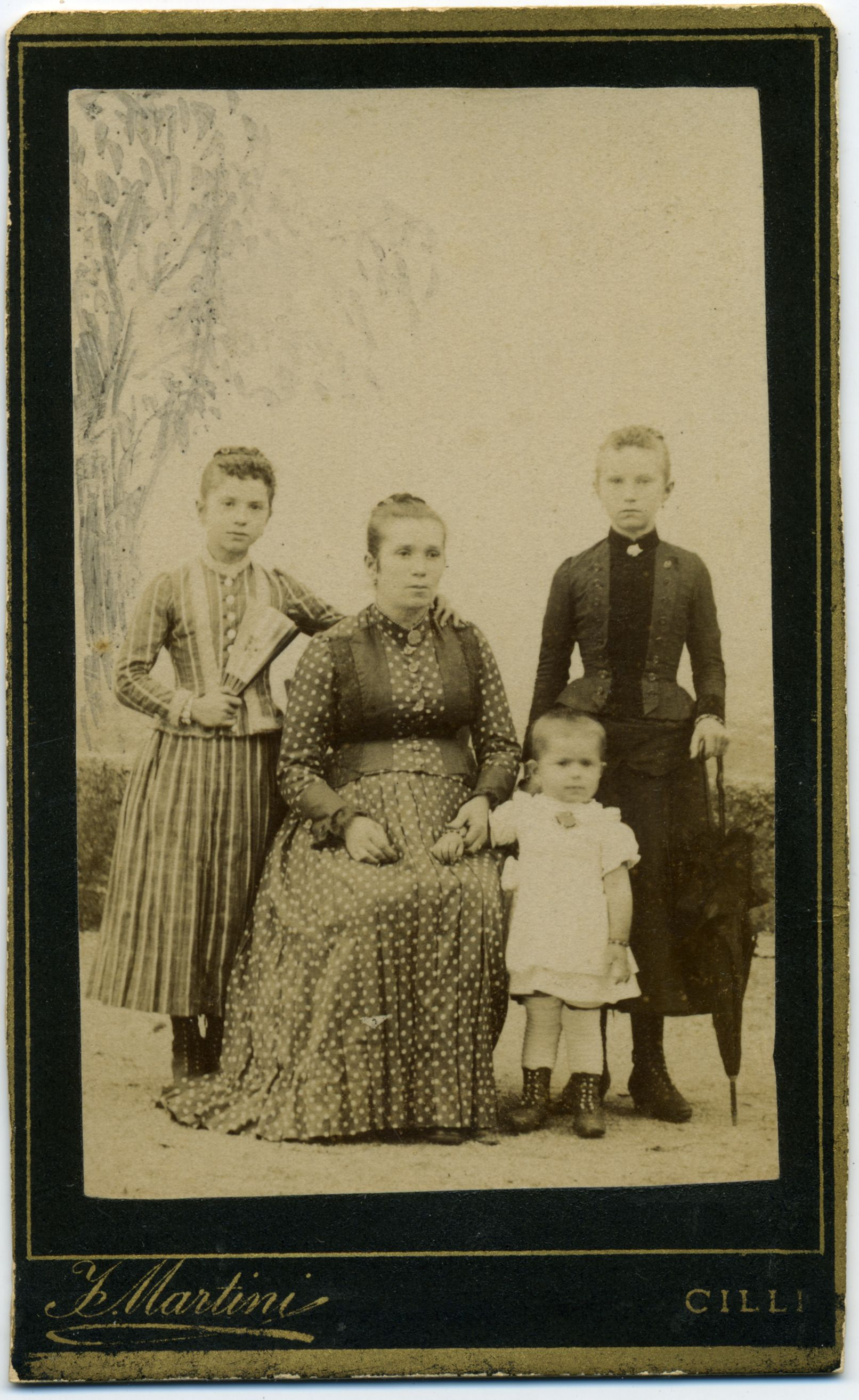
Family portrait, late 19th century

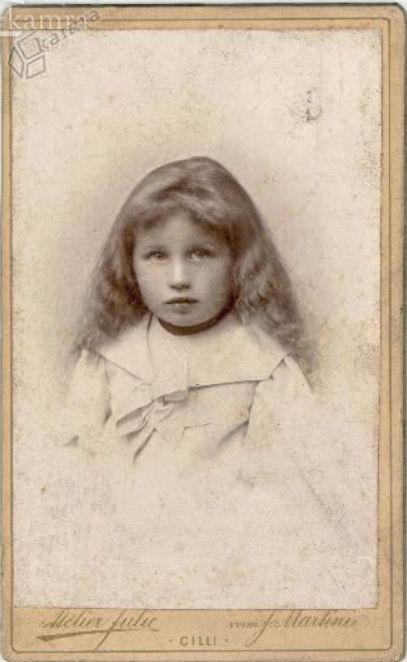
Portrait of Olga Skuhala, c. 1897

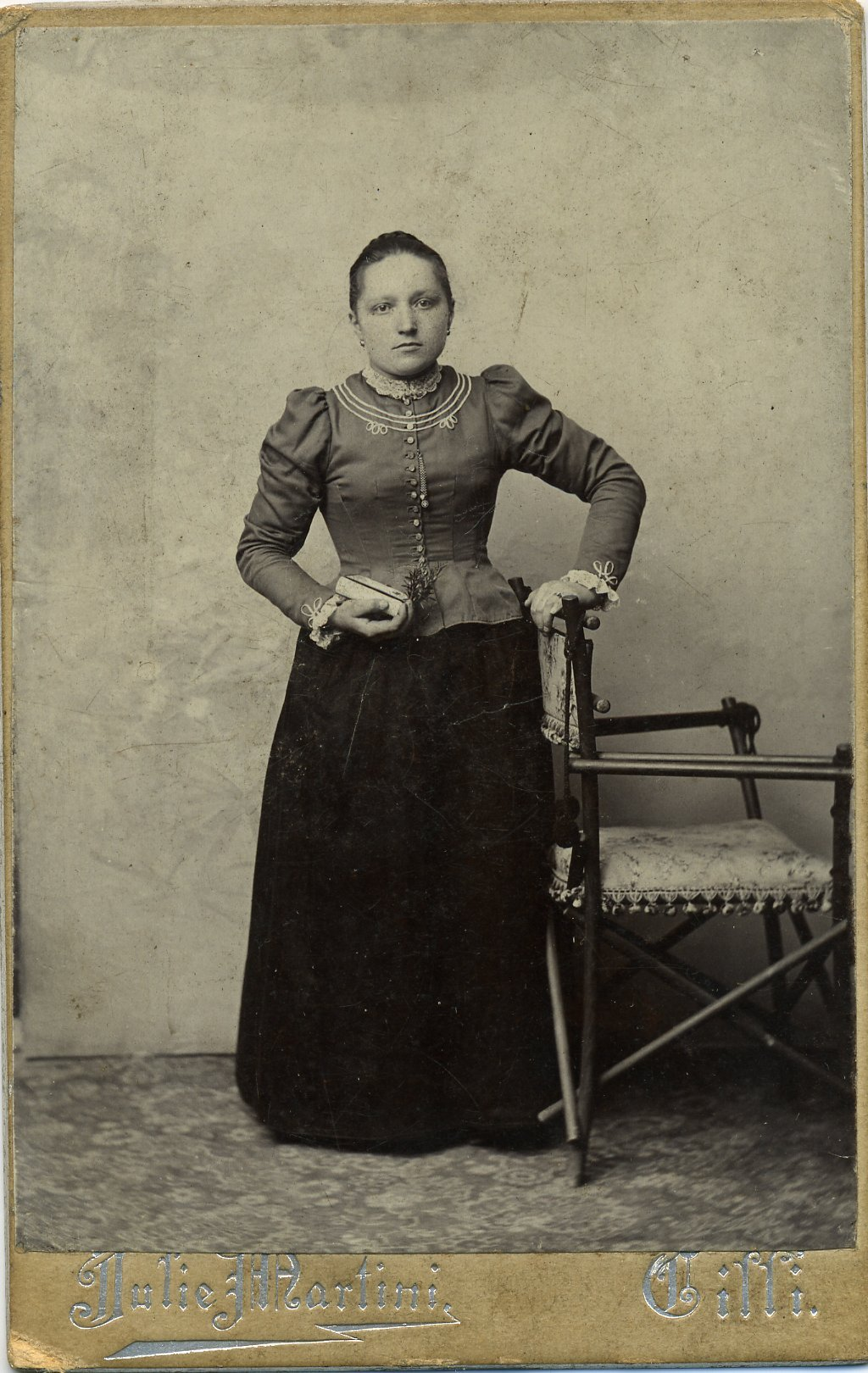
Female portrait, c. 1900

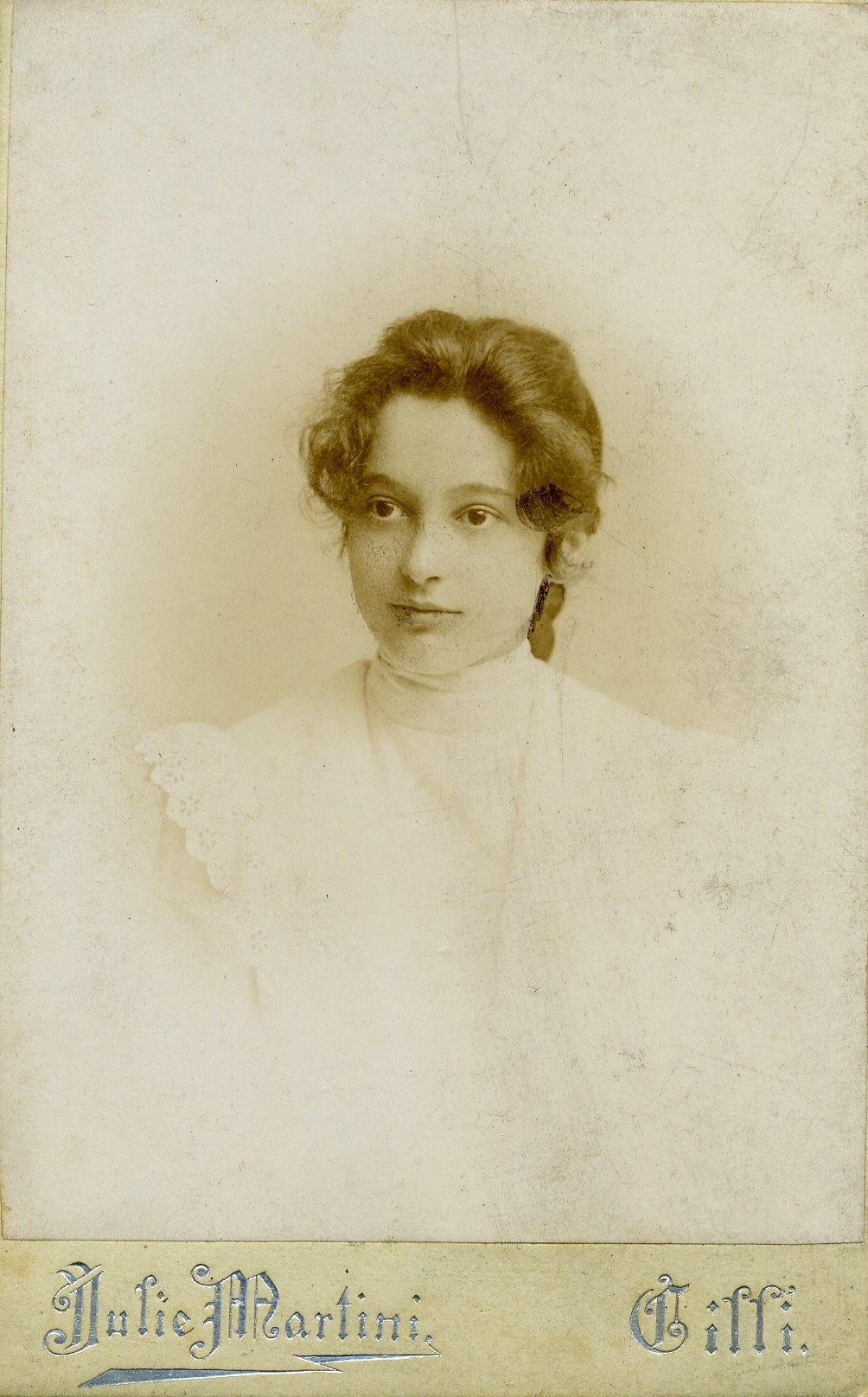
Female portrait, c. 1900

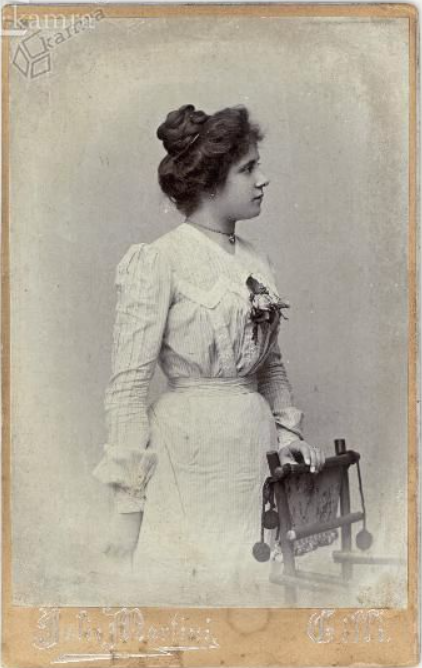
Girl in a summer dress, c. 1900

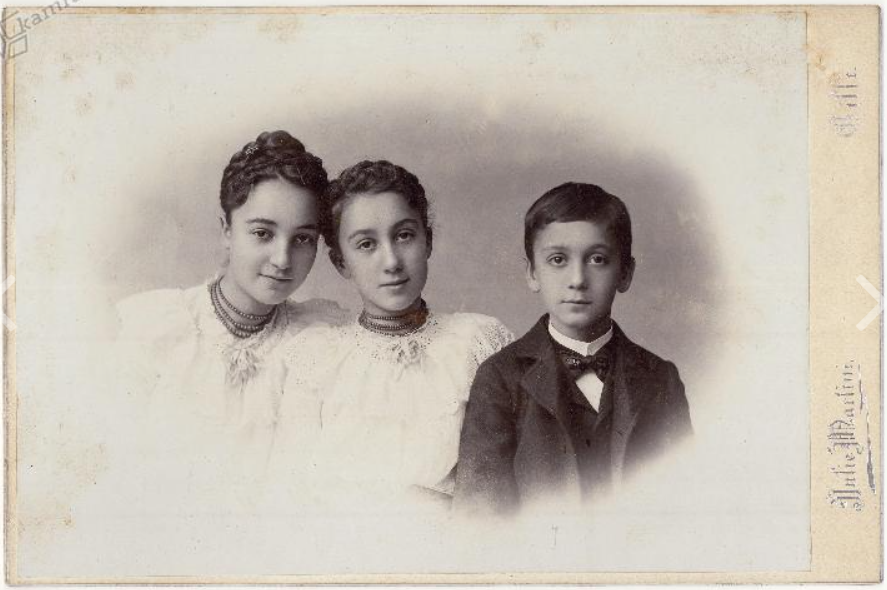
Children of the Donner family, c. 1900

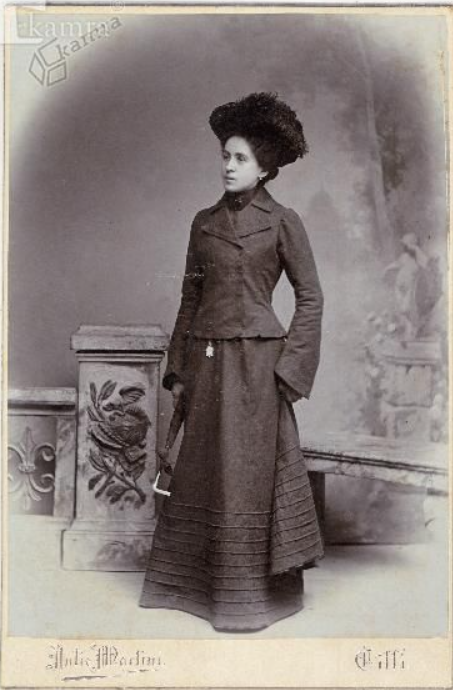
Girl in black, after 1900

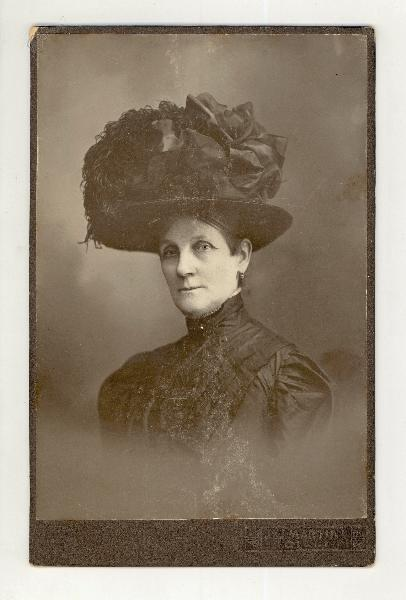
Mrs Laurich, 1908 (with her brother)

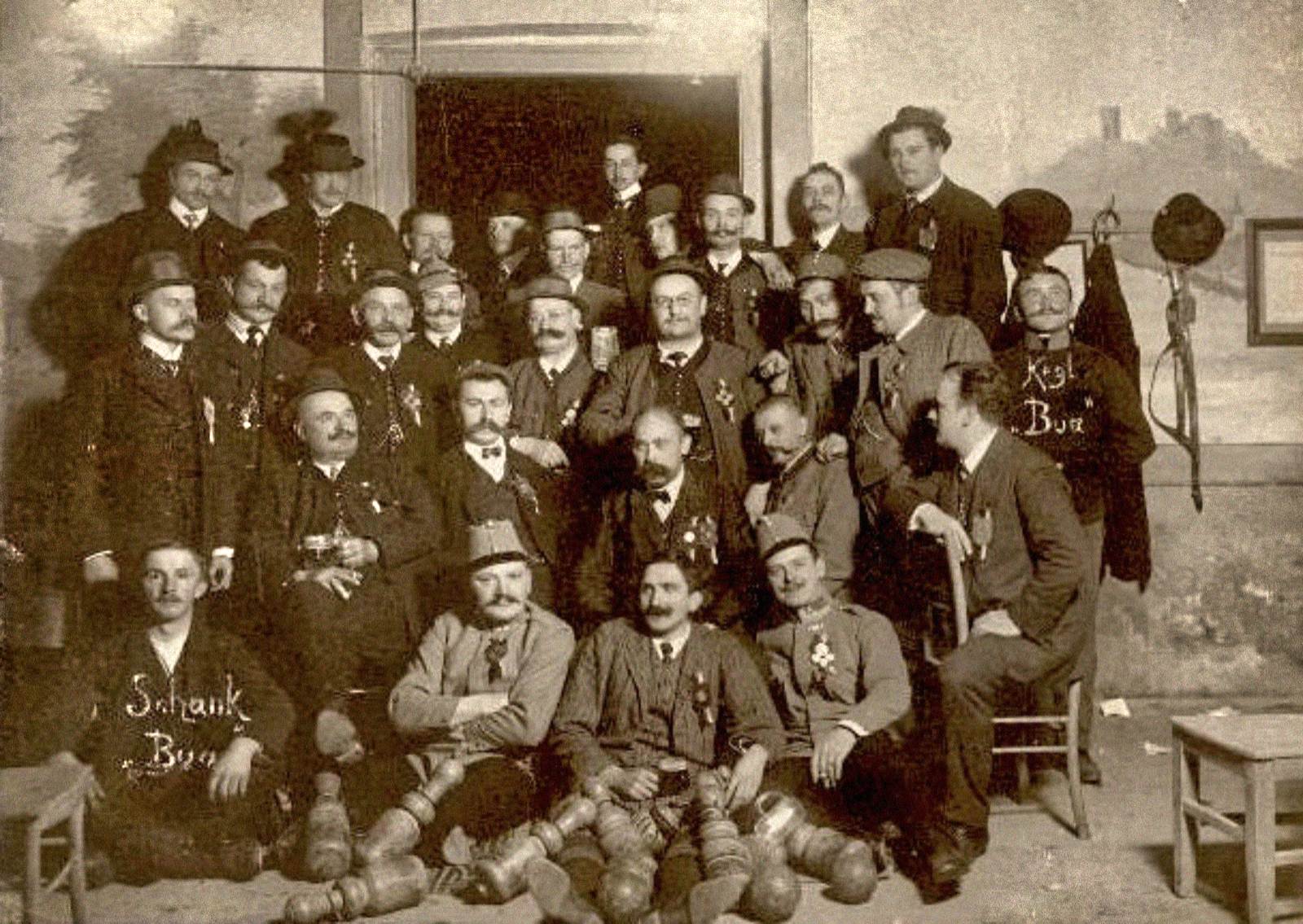
Bowling society in Celje, 1 November 1910 (with her brother)

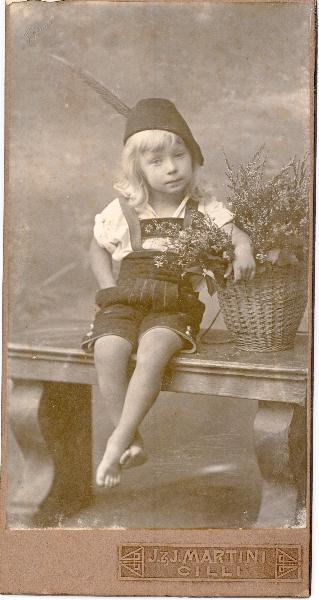
Hermanček, October 1911 (with her brother)

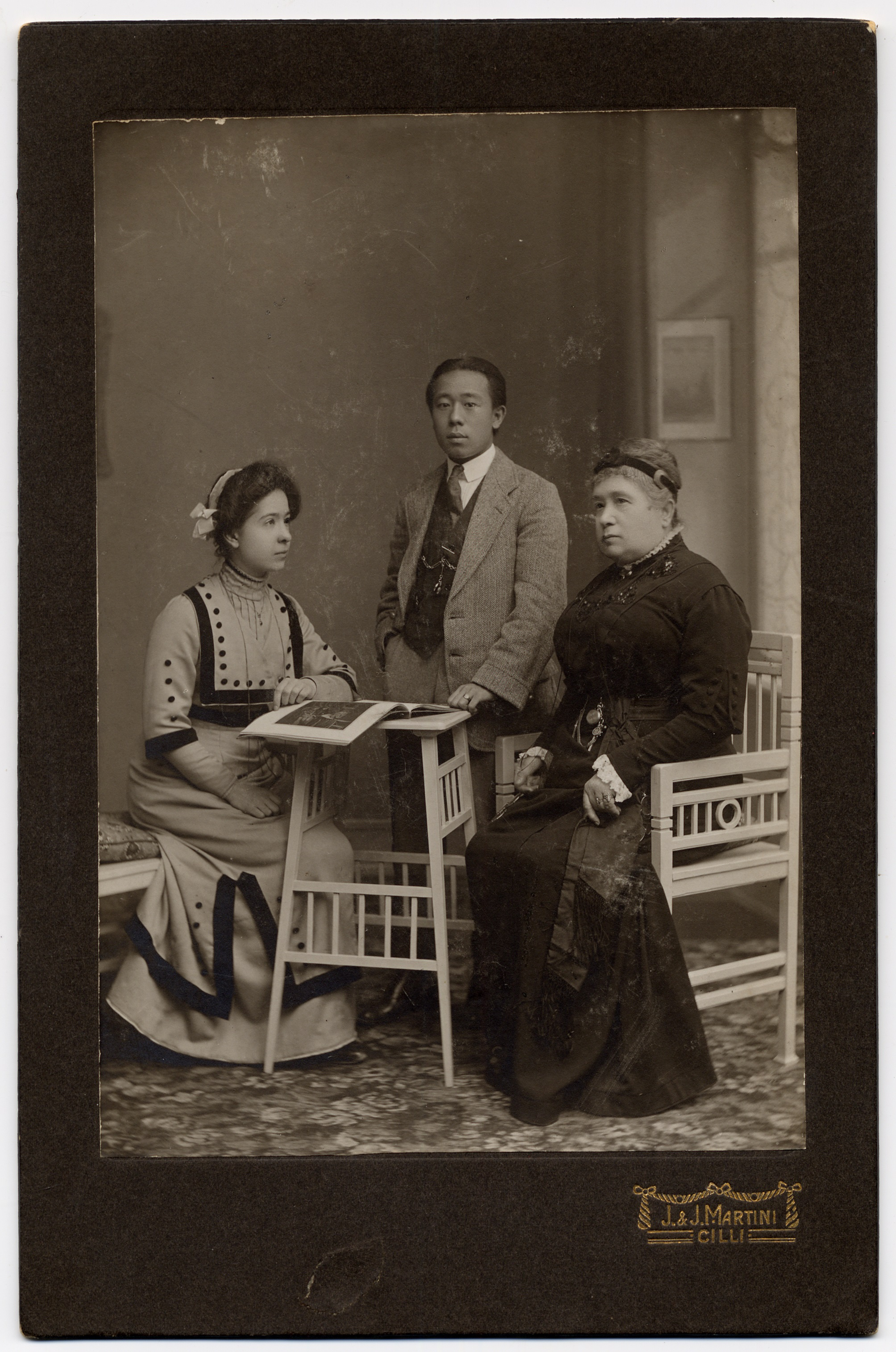
Alma Maksimiljana Karlin with her fiancé Hsu Singjung Lung and her mother, 1910s (with her brother)

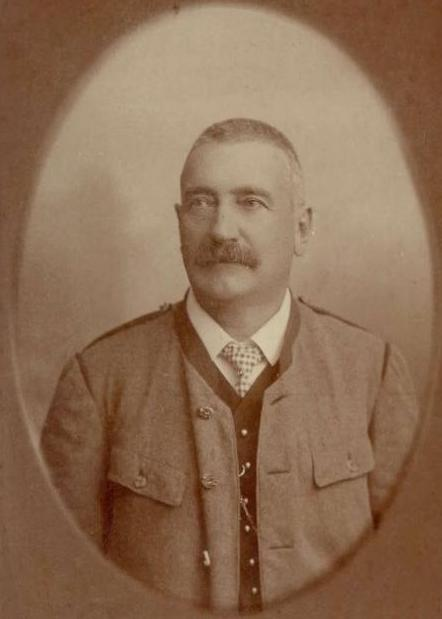
Portrait of Joža Goričar, 1920s (with her brother)

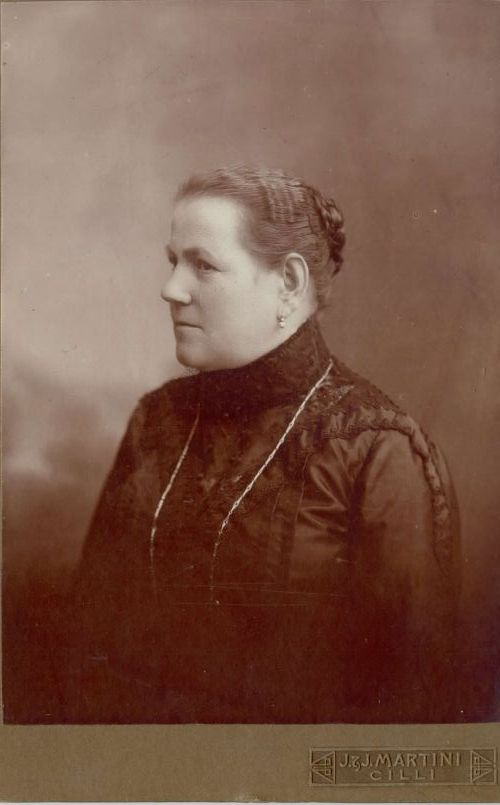
Ivana Vošnjak, 1932 (with her brother)
