= Svetli Dol =

Svetli Dol Glažuta (until 1955)
- Location in Slovenia
- Coordinates: 46°11′5.95″N 15°19′8.61″E
- Country: Slovenia
- Traditional region: Styria
- Statistical region: Savinja
- Municipality: Štore

Area
  - Total: 1.61 km^{2} (0.62 sq mi)
- Elevation: 560.5 m (1,839 ft)

Population (2002)
  - Total: 73
- Postal code: 3220

Svetli Dol (pronounced [ˈsʋɛːtli ˈdoːu̯]) is a settlement in the Municipality of Štore in eastern Slovenia. It lies in the hills south of Svetina. The area is part of the traditional region of Styria. It is now included with the rest of the municipality in the Savinja Statistical Region.

== Name ==
The name of the settlement was changed from Glažuta (literally, 'glassworks' < German Glasshütte) to Svetli Dol (literally, 'bright valley') in 1955. The name was changed on the basis of the 1948 Law on Names of Settlements and Designations of Squares, Streets, and Buildings as part of efforts by Slovenia's postwar communist government to remove German elements from toponyms.

== Cultural heritage ==
The local chapel is dedicated to Saint Florian and dates to 1754.
