= Ogorevc =

- Location in Slovenia
- Coordinates: 46°13′21.76″N 15°20′27.8″E
- Country: Slovenia
- Traditional region: Styria
- Statistical region: Savinja
- Municipality: Štore

Area
  - Total: 1.03 km^{2} (0.40 sq mi)
- Elevation: 323.4 m (1,061 ft)

Population (2002)
  - Total: 87
- Postal code: 3220

Ogorevc (pronounced [ɔɡɔˈɾeːu̯ts]) is a settlement in the Municipality of Štore in eastern Slovenia. The area is part of the traditional region of Styria. It is now included with the rest of the municipality in the Savinja Statistical Region.
