= Rifnik =

- Location in Slovenia
- Coordinates: 46°12′12″N 15°24′31.48″E
- Country: Slovenia
- Traditional region: Styria
- Statistical region: Savinja
- Municipality: Šentjur

Area
  - Total: 1.54 km^{2} (0.59 sq mi)
- Elevation: 330.8 m (1,085 ft)

Population (2020)
  - Total: 172
  - Density: 112/km^{2} (289/sq mi)

Rifnik (pronounced [ˈɾiːfnik], German: Reichenegg) is a settlement in the Municipality of Šentjur, eastern Slovenia. It lies on Rifnik Hill, just south of the town of Šentjur. The settlement, and the entire municipality, are included in the Savinja Statistical Region, which is in the Slovenian portion of the historical Duchy of Styria.

== Name ==
Rifnik was first attested in written sources in 1326 as Reichenekk (and as Reiheneck in 1335 and Reihnek in 1343). The name originally referred to the castle at the site, a compound formed from the Middle High German personal name Rîcho + egge 'hill, castle'. The name therefore originally meant 'Rîcho's castle'.

== Archaeological park ==
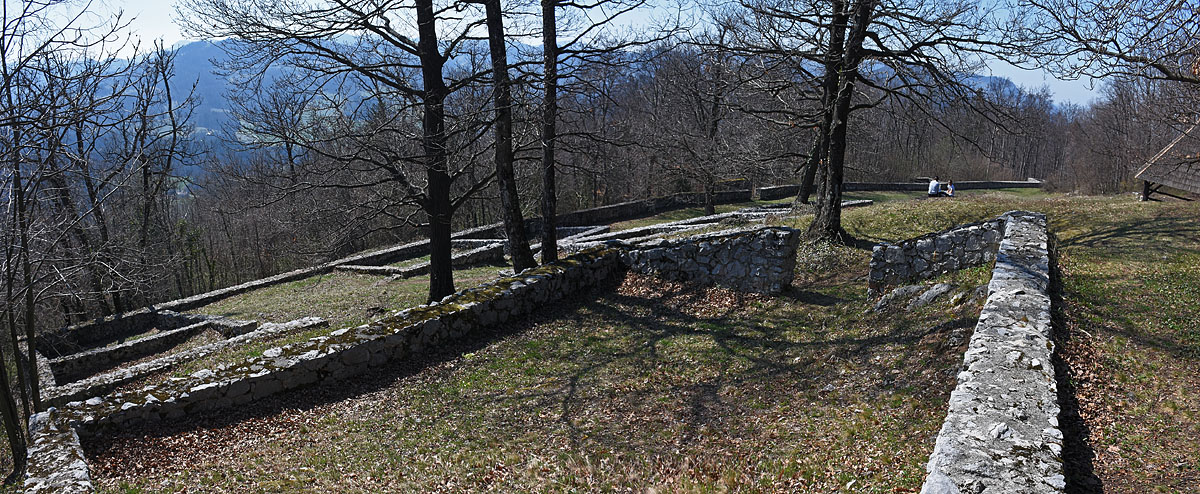
Rifnik Hill, southern terrace

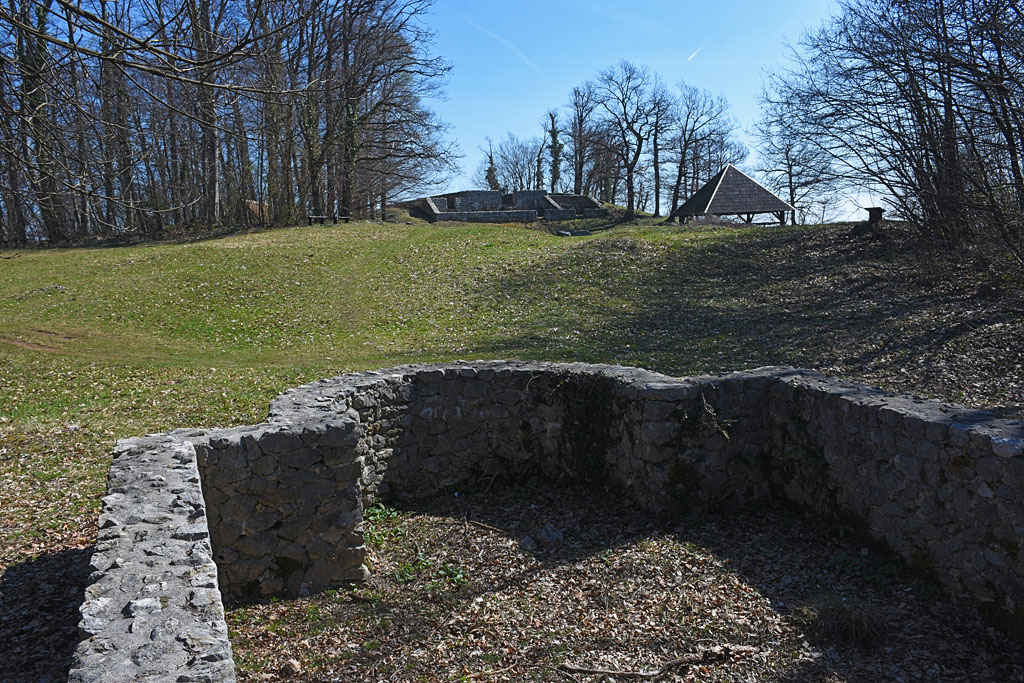
Remains of an Arian church

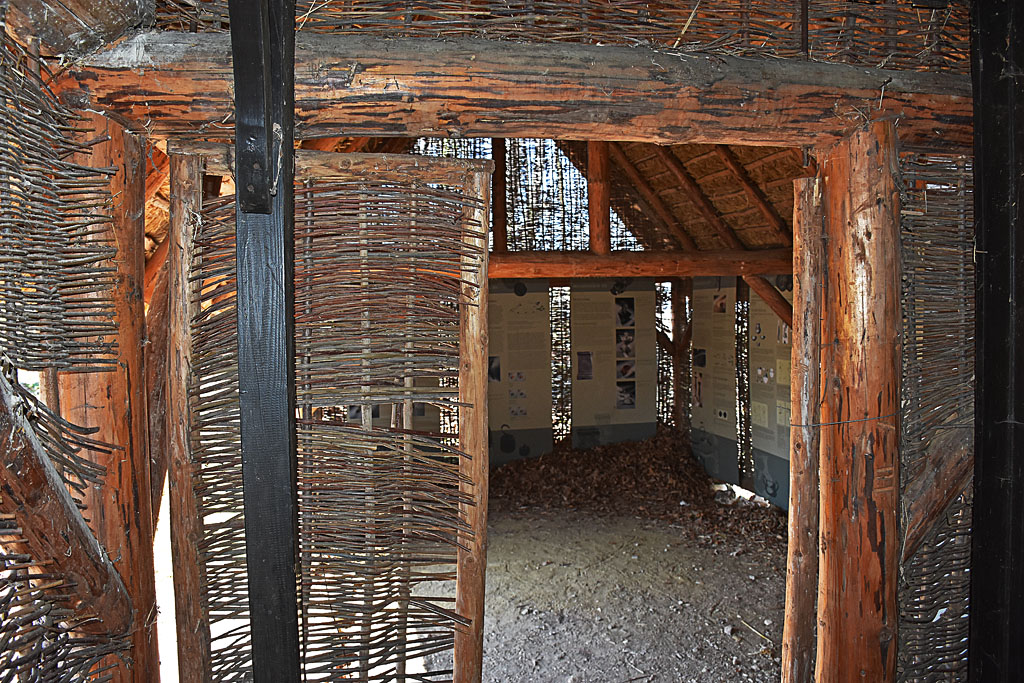
Archaeological exhibition

Archaeological park

Rifnik archaeological park is located on the hilltop above the settlement. It has a permanent exhibition about local prehistoric and ancient finds curated by the Celje Regional Museum.

== Castle ==
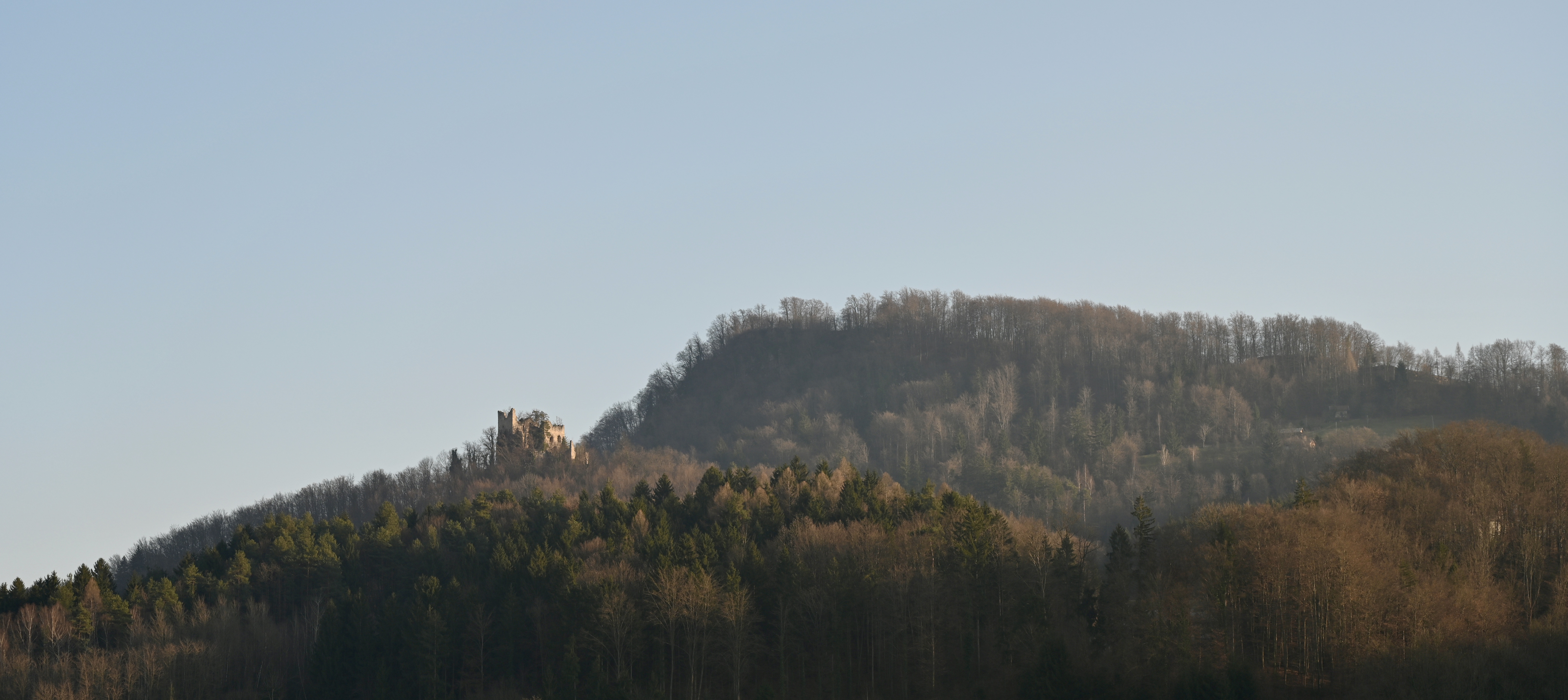
Rifnik Castle (left) below the archaeological park (on the hill on the right)

The settlement is best known for its 13th-century castle. The castle was abandoned in the 17th century, but the remains of the residential part and the fortifications are still visible.
