= Rifnik Hill =

Hill with an archaeological museum in Slovenia

Coordinates: 46°11′54.55″N 15°24′24.80″E

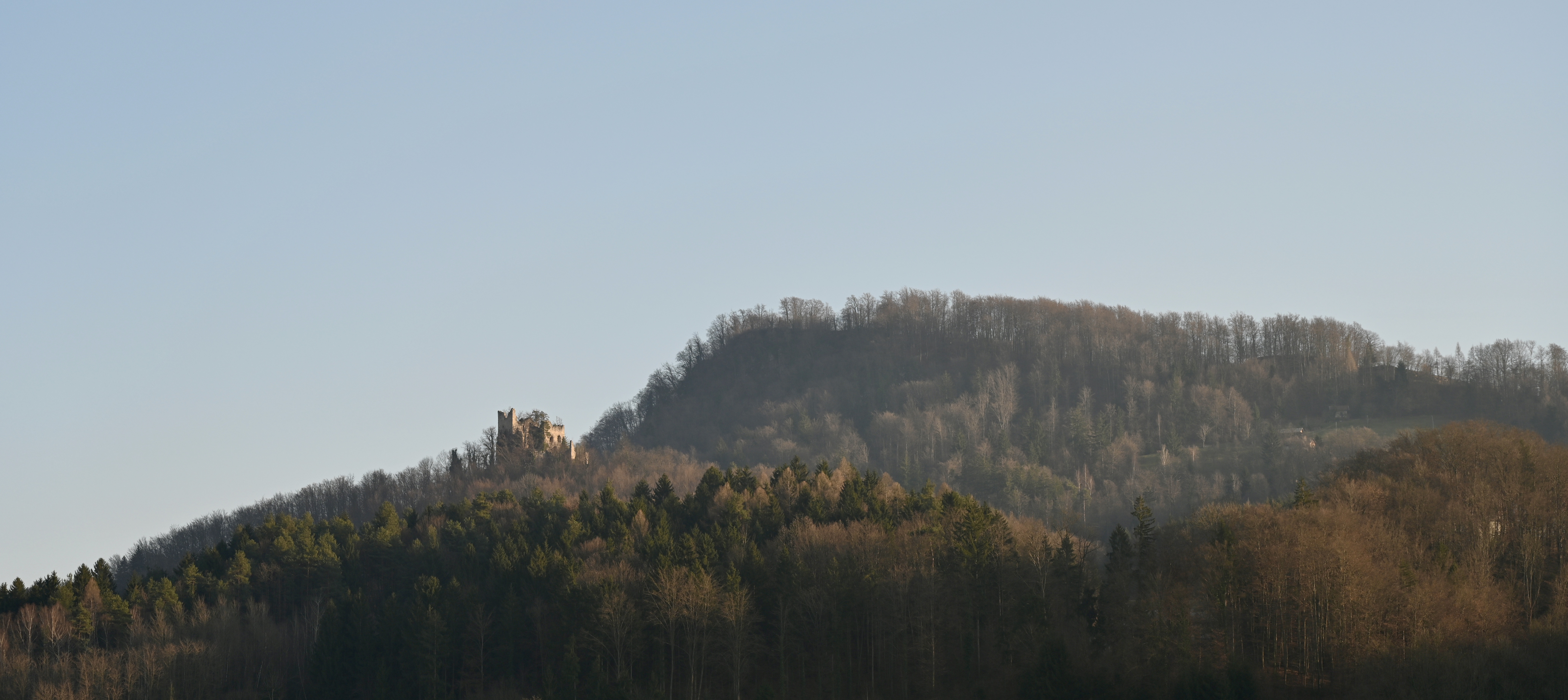
Rifnik Castle (left) below the archaeological park (on the hill on the right)

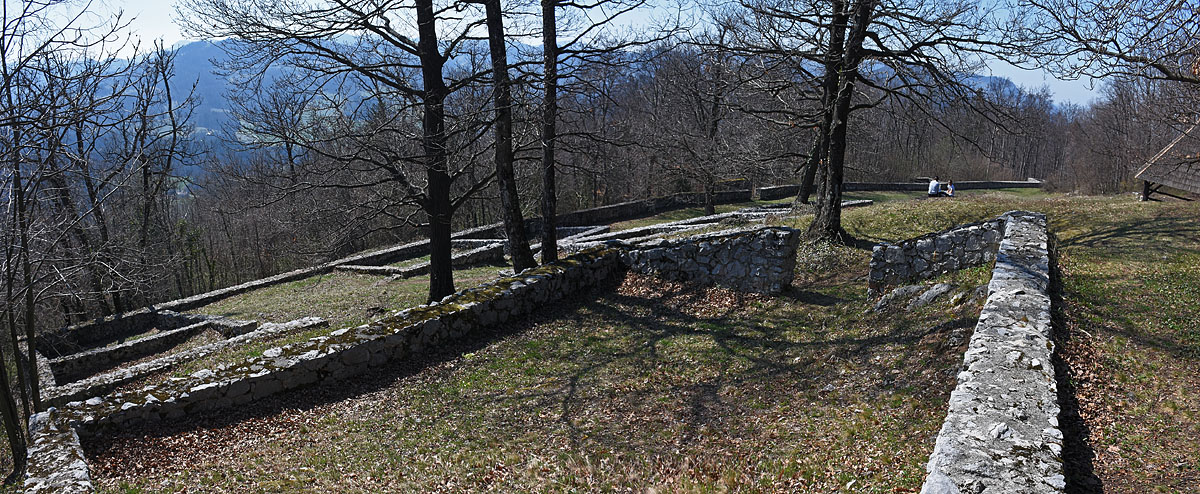
Rifnik Hill, southern terrace

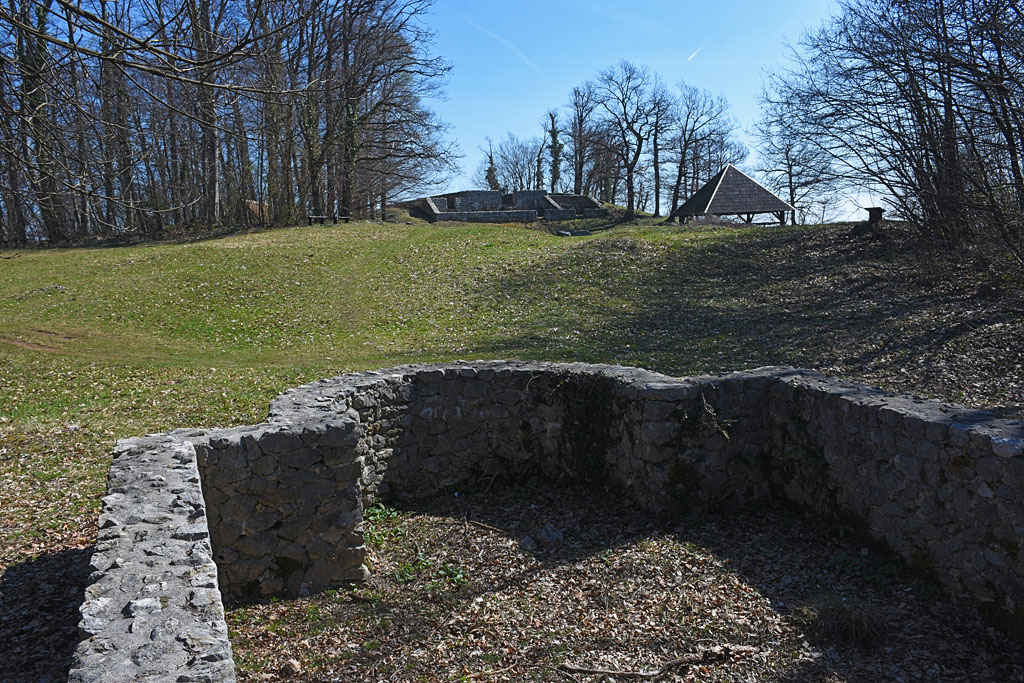
Remains of an Arian church

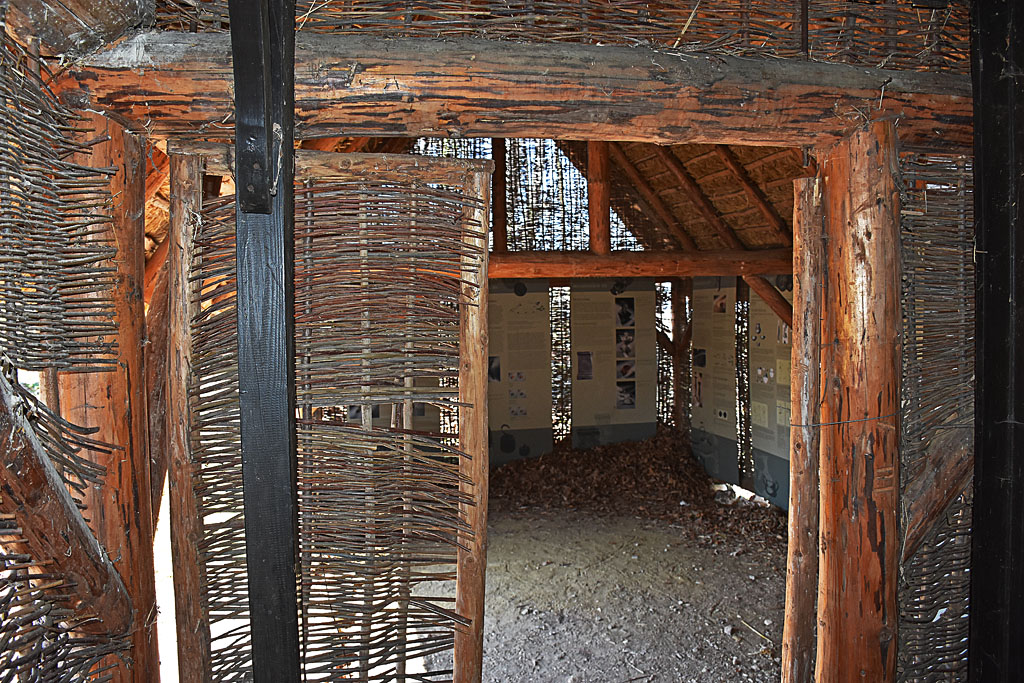
Archaeological exhibition

Rifnik Hill (pronounced [ˈɾiːfnik]) is a hill with an archaeological open-air museum in eastern Slovenia. The archaeological park consists of a reconstruction of a Hallstatt house from the late Bronze Age. Early Iron Age burial mounds were also found on its northern and eastern slopes. A temple dedicated to Aqvon, the deity of the Voglajna River, was built in the Late Roman era, on the foundations of which an early Christian church was later built, and on the western edge of the hill there was another church, where Arianism was practiced.

== Archaeological park ==
The permanent exhibition is based on more than a hundred years of archaeological research and is divided into two parts. The first part covers the beginnings of the excavations and the material culture of the Bronze Age and Iron Age from the end of the 4th century BC to the arrival of the Romans, and the second shows renewed flourishing from the arrival of the Romans to that of the Slavs (1st–6th centuries).
