= Pečovnik =

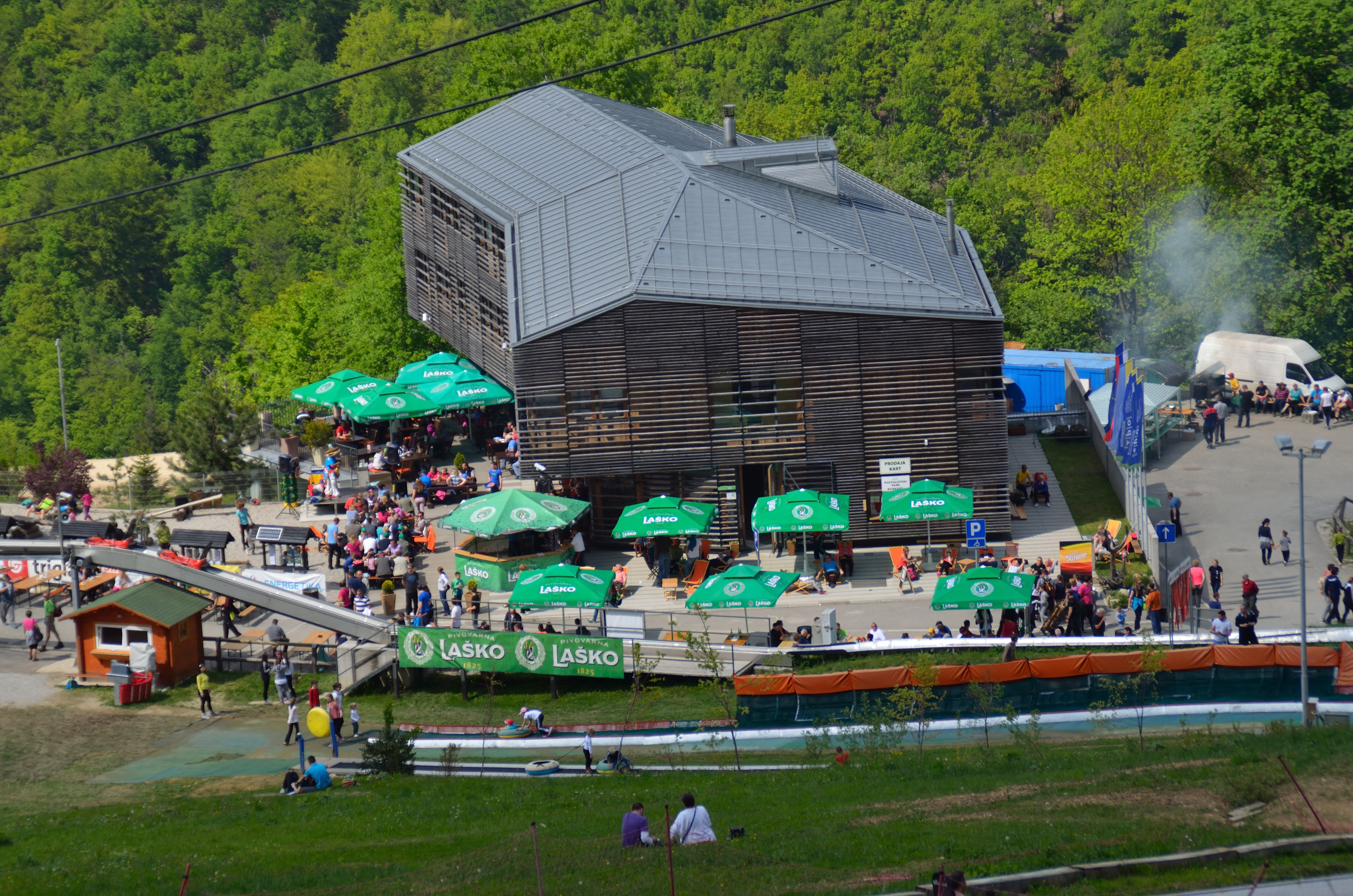
- A hillside hotel in Pečovnik

- Location in Slovenia
- Coordinates: 46°11′57.3″N 15°15′54.39″E
- Country: Slovenia
- Traditional region: Styria
- Statistical region: Savinja
- Municipality: Celje

Area
  - Total: 5.52 km^{2} (2.13 sq mi)
- Elevation: 384.9 m (1,263 ft)

Population (2020)
  - Total: 276
  - Density: 50.0/km^{2} (129/sq mi)

Pečovnik (pronounced [pɛtʃɔu̯ˈniːk]) is a settlement on the left bank of the Savinja River in the City Municipality of Celje in eastern Slovenia. The area is part of the traditional region of Styria. It is now included with the rest of the municipality in the Savinja Statistical Region.

The writer Alma Karlin lived the last years of her life and died in the village. Her house is now a small museum.
