= Šentjanž nad Štorami =

Šentjanž nad Štorami Šent Janž (until 1953)
- Location in Slovenia
- Coordinates: 46°12′12.28″N 15°19′34.65″E
- Country: Slovenia
- Traditional region: Styria
- Statistical region: Savinja
- Municipality: Štore

Area
  - Total: 3.28 km^{2} (1.27 sq mi)
- Elevation: 448.1 m (1,470 ft)

Population (2002)
  - Total: 204
- Postal code: 3220

Šentjanž nad Štorami (pronounced [ʃɛnˈtjaːnʃ nat ˈʃtoːɾami] or [ʃənˈtjaːnʃ nat ˈʃtoːɾami]) is a settlement in the Municipality of Štore in eastern Slovenia. It lies in the hills just south of Štore itself. The area is part of the traditional region of Styria. It is now included with the rest of the municipality in the Savinja Statistical Region.

== Name ==
The name of the settlement was changed from Šent Janž (literally, 'Saint John') to Šentjanž nad Štorami in 1953.

== Church ==
The local church is dedicated to John the Baptist. It dates to around 1500, although it was partially rebuilt in the 17th and 18th centuries.
