= Alma Karlin =

Slovenian travel writer and poet

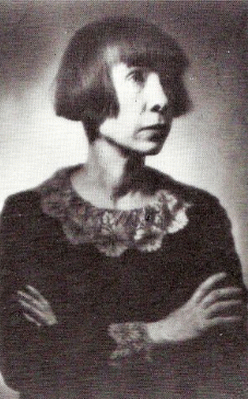
- Alma Maximiliana Karlin
- Born: October 12, 1889; Celje (German: Cilli), Styria, Cisleithania, Austria-Hungary.
- Died: January 14, 1950 (aged 60); Pečovnik, Slovenia
- Resting place: Svetina, Obcina Store, Savinjska, Slovenia

Alma Maximiliana Karlin (October 12, 1889 – January 14, 1950) was a Slovenian traveler, writer, poet, collector, polyglot and theosophist. She was one of the first European women to circle the globe alone.

== Biography ==
She was born in the Styrian town of Celje (now part of Slovenia) in what was then the Austro-Hungarian Empire as the daughter of Jakob Karlin (1829–1898), a major in the Austro-Hungarian Army, and Wilibalde Miheljak (a.k.a. Vilibalda, 1844–1928), a teacher. Her father, aged around 66, died when she was eight years old. Alma grew in a predominately German-speaking milieu, and regarded herself chiefly as Austrian rather than ethnic German or Slovene. She was born with a spinal defect and wore devices intended to remedy this during her childhood.

After completing her secondary education in Graz, she traveled to London in 1908, where she studied languages. She learned English, French, Latin, Italian, Norwegian, Danish, Finnish, Russian, and Spanish. In the later years, she also studied Persian, Chinese, and Japanese. She also spent six months in Paris, where she attended various languages courses at the Sorbonne. and learned Esperanto.

It was at this time when she started work on her (unpublished) dictionary of ten languages, including Slovene.

At the outbreak of World War I in 1914 Karlin was in London working as a translator. She had to move to Sweden and Norway, since she was considered a persona non grata in the United Kingdom for being an Austro-Hungarian citizen. It was in Scandinavia that she met the Swedish writer Selma Lagerlöf, who was so impressed by Karlin and her writing that she proposed her for a Nobel Prize.

In 1919, she returned home, to Celje, then already part of the Kingdom of Yugoslavia. Almost immediately thereafter, however, she started raising money for another journey. To this purpose, she opened a language school in Celje, where she taught up to ten hours a day, while her spare time was spent in painting and writing.

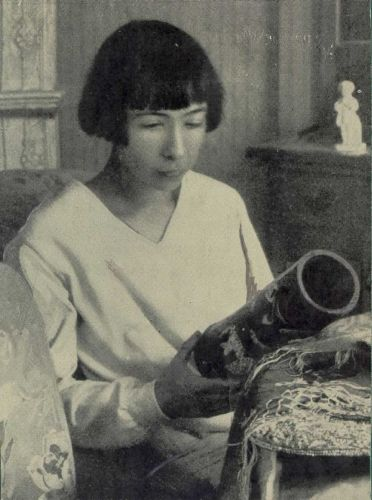
Alma Karlin in the 1920s

On November 24, 1919, she took off again, this time on a nine-year-long journey around the world. She took all her money with her (around $130), a typewriter and her multi-language dictionary. Karlin therefore had to work to finance her travels, often as an interpreter or by writing about the places she visited. She visited South and North America, the Pacific Islands, Australia, and various Asian countries. The last leg of her journey around the world was India. While she is often regarded as the first European women who travelled solo around the globe, she was the second woman to do so, preceded by Ida Pfeiffer.

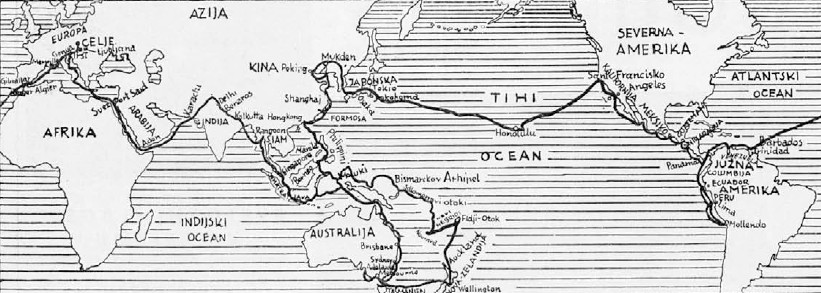
Map of Karlin's around-the world journey from 1919 until 1927

In January 1928, at the request of her dying mother, Alma Karlin returned home, herself exhausted by physical illness and deep depression. She never travelled extensively again. She devoted most of her time to writing. The books about her travels, Alone Around the World (Einsame Weltreise), published in three volumes between 1929 and 1933, were very popular and cemented her reputation. She went on lecture tours around Europe and met the artist Thea Schreiber Gammelin (or Gamelin). They became friends and Karlin described Gammelin as her "soulmate".

Around 1934, she started developing a keen interest in the study of theosophy. In the later years, especially during World War II, she became close to Roman Catholicism.

Karlin had chronicled her journey in hundreds of reports published in various magazines and newspapers, including the gazette of the Germans in Celje, the Cillier Zeitung, and the German newspapers Neue Illustrierte Zeitung and Der Deutsche Bergknappe. After her return home, she wrote numerous works of fiction and non-fiction. She wrote in German until the rise of the Nazi German regime, when she abandoned German as an act of protest. In Germany, her books were burned by the regime. She also wrote in English for the English-speaking areas. In 1937–38, the Franco-German journalist and anti-Nazi writer Hans Joachim Bonsack found refuge in her home.

Soon after the Axis invasion of Yugoslavia in April 1941 and the German occupation of Lower Styria, she was arrested and sent to Maribor where she waited for the extradition to Serbia, along with thousands of Slovenes. She was released to house arrest thanks to the vigorous intervention of Gammelin and a Gestapo officer who turned out to appreciate Karlin's books. She return to live under house arrest in Celje. In spring 1944, she decided to escape to the southern Slovenian region of White Carniola, which was controlled by the Slovene partisan resistance. Even though she was severely ill, the Communist-led Partisans did not allow her to fly to the Allied-occupied town of Bari in Southern Italy. Instead, she was transported to Dalmatia where she stayed until the end of the war, when she moved back to Celje.

She died of breast cancer and tuberculosis on January 14, 1950, in the village of Pečovnik near Celje and is buried alongside Thea Schreiber Gammelin (1906–1988) in the Svetina churchyard.

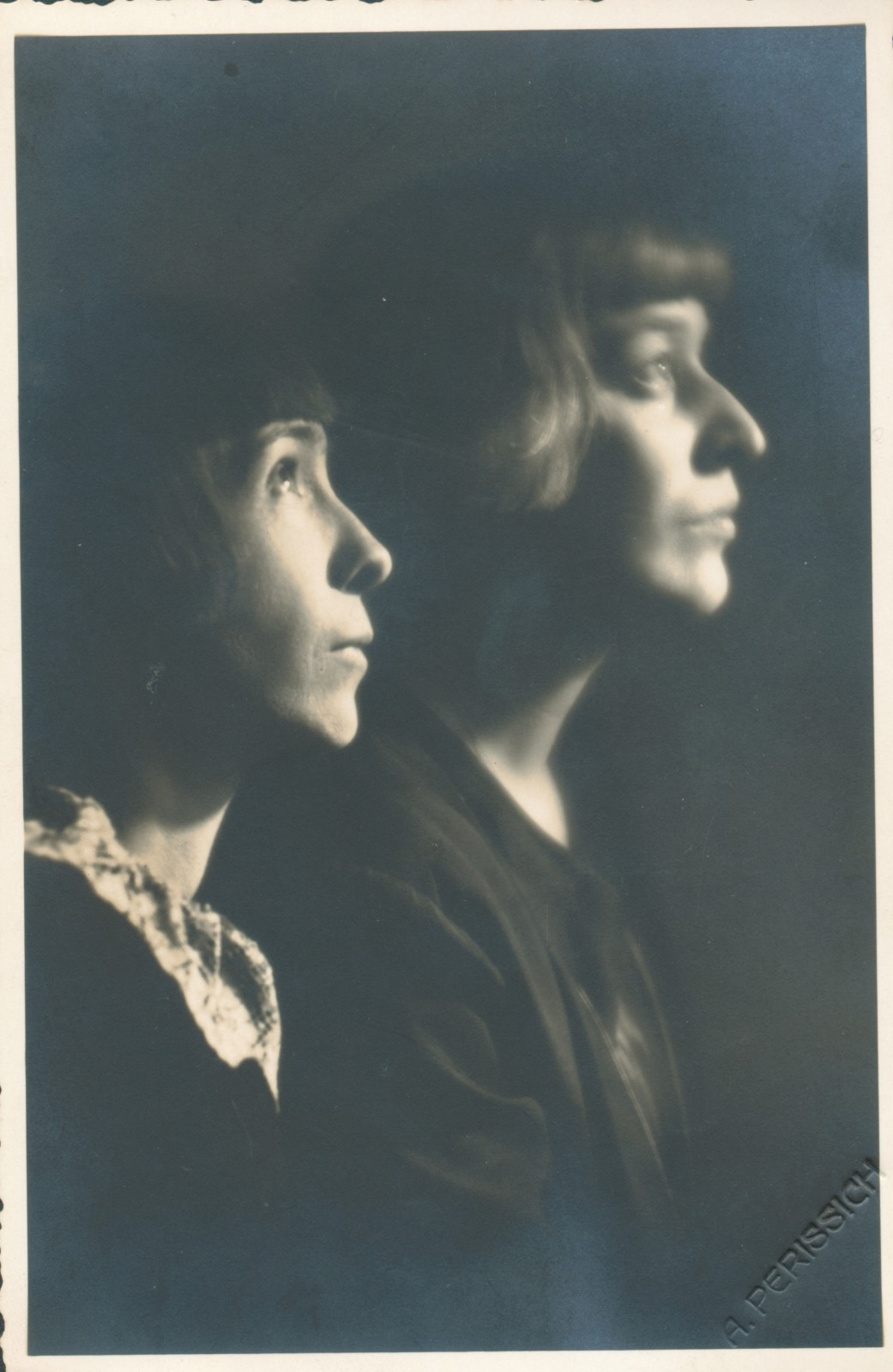
Alma Karlin (left) and Thea Gammelin

== Legacy ==
Almost inevitably, Karlin also became a collector and ethnologist. Most of the objects she acquired on her journeys she sent home, where she later set up a small private museum. Some of the exhibits are now housed in the Celje Regional Museum. Many of her writings have not yet been published; most of them are kept in the National and University Library of Slovenia and in the Berlin State Library.

There is a bronze statue of Karlin near the railway station in Celje.

A documentary film about her life was made in 2009, entitled Alma M. Karlin: Samotno potovanje. Karlin was portrayed by actress Veronika Drolc, and the film was directed by Marta Frelih.

In summer 2015, Marijan Pušavec wrote and Jakob Klemenčič illustrated the graphic novel Alma M. Karlin: Svetovljanka iz province (Alma M. Karlin: A Cosmopolitan from the Provinces). This has been translated into German.

== House in Pečovnik ==
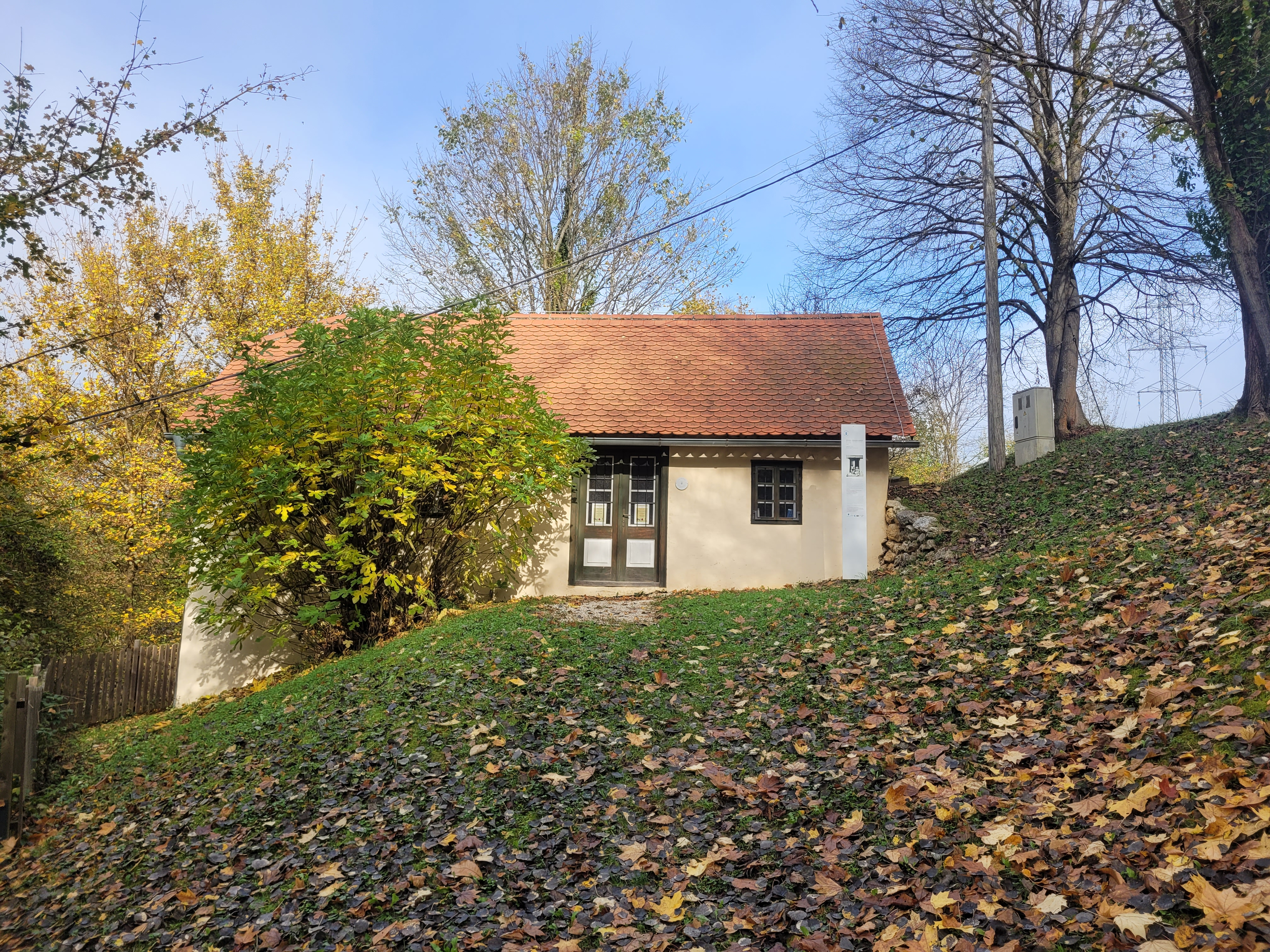
Home in Pečovnik

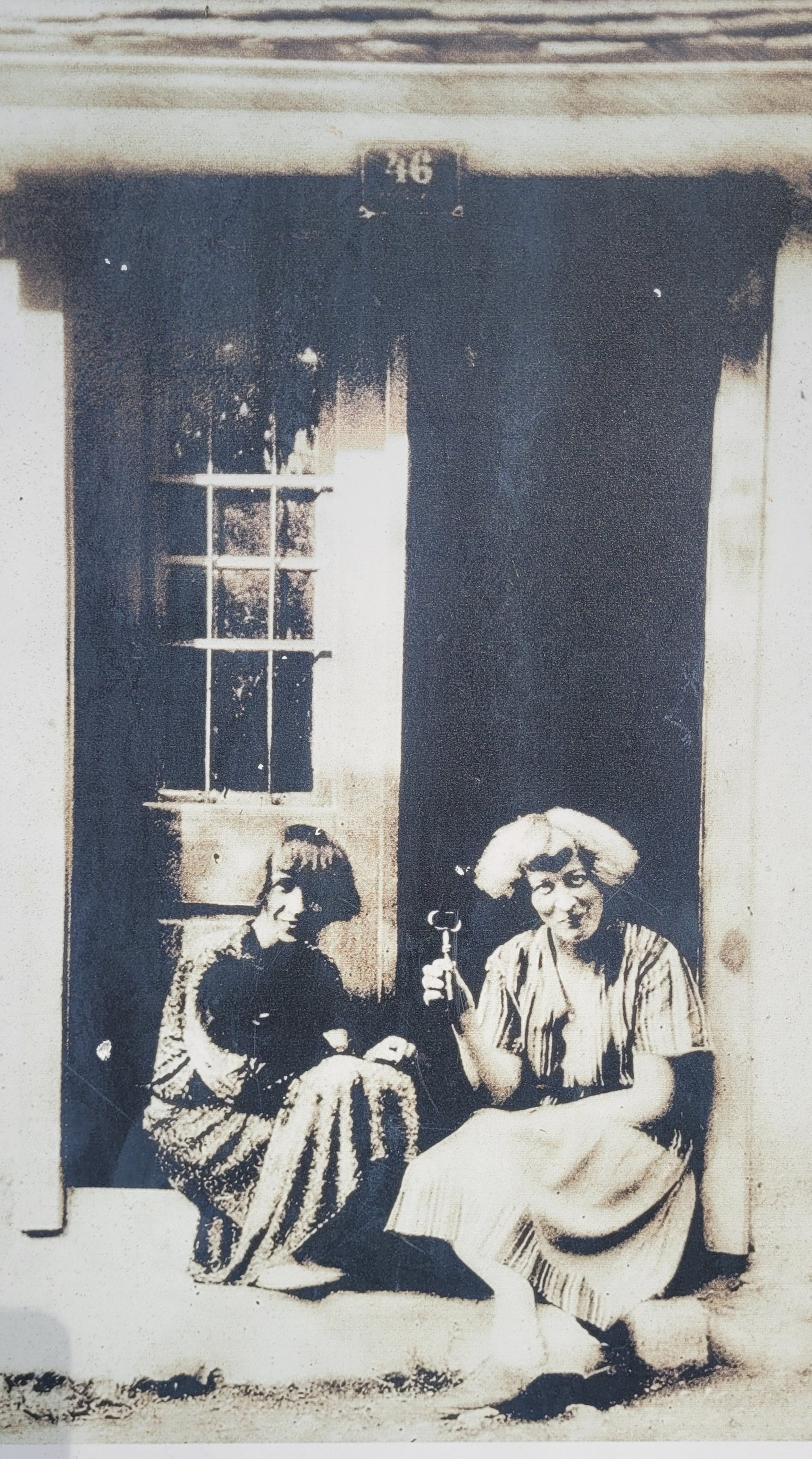
Alma Karlin (left) in front of her home.

In this house, at the time at 46, Pečovnik, Karlin spent the last years of her life, from June 1945 to January 14, 1950. She moved there together with Gammelin after returning from the partisan-held areas or after the confiscation of her property. Gammelin, who was the owner of the house and the former vineyard, continued to live there until her own death in 1988. Both are buried in Svetina.

In the house there is the exhibition, The Lonely Journey of Alma M. Karlin.

== Publications ==
Karlin is the author of over 40 books, novellas and articles. Some titles were published in German first, then translated into Slovenian. The English translations of titles are approximate. Some English translations have been published. She also wrote some articles in English for an English-speaking audience.

She published her most important works - biographies, novels, ethnology and theosophical works - in the first decade after her round-the-world voyage, between summer 1928 and summer 1938. Twenty-two of her books were published between 1921 and 1937 by various foundations in Germany, England, Finland and Switzerland. Some of these were reprinted; three of her most important travel books sold over 80,000 copies at the time and were translated into English, French and Finnish. Those works became very popular in Central Europe. Some of her books were illustrated by Celje painter August Friderik Seebacher and Thea Schreiber Gammelin.

=== Novels ===
- Malik (novel), 1932 [Malik]
- Samotno potovanje, 1969 [Solitary Travel]
- Roman o potopu celine, 1936 [A Novel on the Flood of the Continent]
- Moj mali Kitajec: roman iz Kitajske, 1921 [My Little Chinese: a novel from China]
- Mistika Južnega morja, I. del Polinezija, II. del Melanezija-Mikronezija, 1931 [Mysticism of the South Sea. Part I: Polynesia. Part II: Melanesia-Micronesia]
- Nabobova stranska žena, 1937 [Nabob's side wife]

=== Novellas ===
- Mala Siamka, 1937 [Little Siam]
- Najmlajši vnuk častitljivega I Čaa: novela iz Kitajske, 1948 [The youngest grandson of the venerable I Cha: a novel from China]
- O Joni San: Japonske novele, 2006 [Joni San - Japanese Novels]

=== Short stories ===
- Kupa pozabljenja: dve zgodbi, 1938 [Cup of Forgetting: Two Stories]
- Zmaji in duhovi, 1996 [Dragons and spirits]
- Mala pomlad: tri zgodbe, 1937 [Little Spring: Three Stories]
- Mesečeve solze: zgodba iz Peruja, 1935 [Moon Tears: The Story of Peru]
- Štiri dekleta v vetru usode: Zgodba z Južnega morja, 1936, 1939, 1943 [Four Girls in the Wind of Destiny: The Story of the South Sea]
- Svetlikanje v mraku, 1999 [Twinkling at dusk]

=== Travelogues ===
- Doživeti svet, 2006 [To experience the world]
  - The odyssey of a lonely woman (London: Victor Gollancz, 1933)

=== Drama works ===
- Kringhausenčani: drama v treh dejanjih, 1918 [Kringhausen: Drama in Three Acts]

=== Other works ===
- Kot ujetnica pri lovcih na glavo na Novi Gvineji, 1960 [As a Captive in the Headhunters of New Guinea]
- Modri mesec, 1997 [Blue Moon]
- Smrtonosni trn, 2006 [Death Thorn]
  - The death-thorn and other strange experiences in Peru and Panama (London: G. Allen & Unwin Ltd, 1934)
  - The Death-thorn: magic, superstitions, and beliefs of urban Indians in Panama and Peru (Detroit, 1971)
- Angel na zemlji, 1998 [Angel on Earth]
- Doživeti svet, 2006 [Experiencing the World]
- Urok Južnega morja: tragedija neke žene (Im Banne der Sudsee), 1930, prevod Celje, Mohorjeva družba, 1996 (COBISS) [The Spell of the South Sea: The Tragedy of a Woman]
  - Mystik der Südsee: Liebeszauber, Todeszauber, Götterglaube, seltsame Bräuche bei Geburten usw. [Mystique of the South Seas: love spells, death spells, polytheism, strange birth customs, etc.], with pen-and-ink drawings by A.F. Seebacher (Berlin: Lichterfelde Hugo Bermühler, 1931)
- Into-Yo-Intec, 1934 [Into-Yo-Intec]
- Popotne skice, 1997 [Travel Sketches]
- Pod košatim očesom, 1938 [Under the Bony Eye]
- Moji zgubljeni topoli, 2007 [My Lost Poplars]
- Smrtonosni trn in druge nenavadne zgodbe iz Peruja in Paname (Ljubljana: Mladinska knjiga, 2011)
