= Municipality of Štore =

Municipality of Slovenia

Municipality of Štore Občina Štore
- Municipality
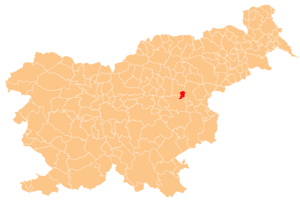
- Location of the Municipality of Štore in Slovenia
- Coordinates: 46°12′N 15°20′E
- Country: Slovenia

Government
  - Mayor: Miran Jurkošek

Area
  - Total: 28.1 km^{2} (10.8 sq mi)

Population (July 1, 2018)
  - Total: 4,332
  - Density: 154/km^{2} (399/sq mi)
- Time zone: UTC+01 (CET)
  - Summer (DST): UTC+02 (CEST)
- Website: https://www.store.si/

The Municipality of Štore (pronounced [ˈʃtoːɾɛ]; Slovene: Občina Štore) is a municipality in the traditional region of Styria in northeastern Slovenia. The seat of the municipality is the town of Štore. Štore became a municipality in 1994. The Municipality of Štore was established in accordance with the Act on the Establishment of Municipalities and Determination of Their Areas. The municipality covers an area of 28.1 square kilometers (10.8 sq mi). It has a population of 4,144 people living in 12 settlements.

== Administrative center ==
The seat of the municipality is the settlement of Štore. The settlement is divided into two parts, industrial and residential. The residential part has schools, a health center, a post office, and sports facilities. The industrial area was expanded with the creation of two new craft zones.

== Local community ==
Because of its small size, the municipality has only one local community, the Local Community of Svetina (Slovene: Kravna skupnost Svetina). The office of this community is in Svetina.

== The flag ==
The flag of the municipality is rectangular. It is divided vertically into two parts in a ratio of 1:3. The smaller part is blue and the larger one is green with the coat of arms in the center. The blue part symbolizes metallurgy and mining, and the green part symbolizes the green landscape of the municipality.

== Holiday ==
The municipal holiday is on June 1. The day is celebrated in memory of June 1, 1836, when Ignacij Novak, the only Slovene that owned a mine in the area, received rights to open a mine. To celebrate this occasion, residents received awards, including the Golden Emblem, Silver Emblem, and Bronze Emblem of the Municipality of Štore.

== Settlements ==
In addition to the municipal seat of Štore, the municipality also includes the following settlements:

- Draga
- Javornik
- Kanjuce
- Kompole
- Laška Vas pri Štorah
- Ogorevc
- Pečovje
- Prožinska Vas
- Šentjanž nad Štorami
- Svetina
- Svetli Dol
