= Štore =

Locality of Slovenia

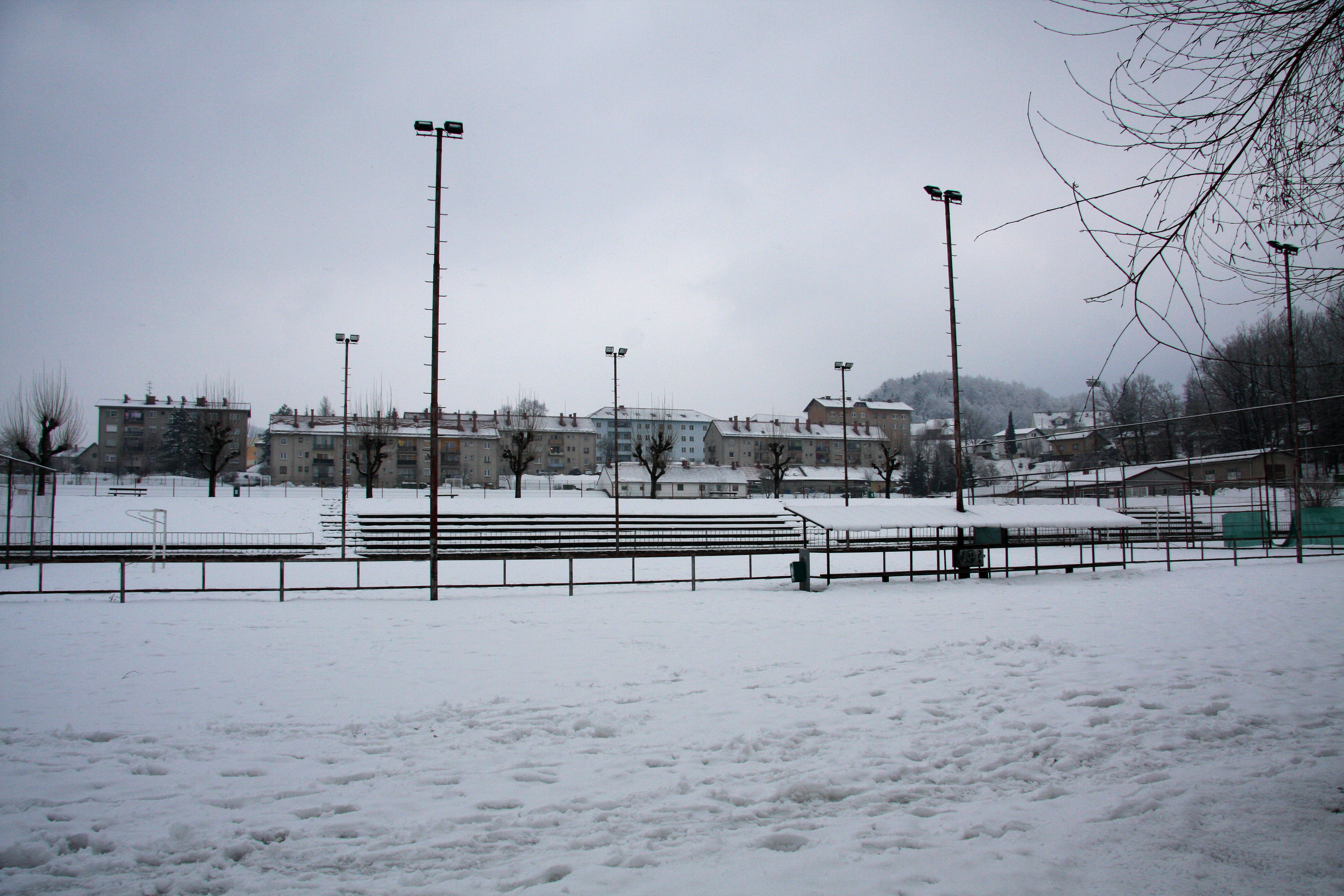

- Location in Slovenia
- Coordinates: 46°13′19″N 15°18′40″E
- Country: Slovenia
- Traditional region: Styria
- Statistical region: Savinja
- Municipality: Štore

Area
  - Total: 2.28 km^{2} (0.88 sq mi)
- Elevation: 263.5 m (865 ft)

Population (2019)
  - Total: 2,257
- Postal code: 3220

Štore (pronounced [ˈʃtoːɾɛ]) is a town in eastern Slovenia. It is the seat of the Municipality of Štore. It lies on the Voglajna River, just east of Celje. The area is part of the traditional region of Styria. The municipality is now included in the Savinja Statistical Region.

== Name ==
The name Štore is probably originally an accusative plural derived from the Slovene common noun štor 'stump', referring to an area where stumps remained after it was cleared.

== History ==
Until the Second World War, Štore was a hamlet of the village of Kresnike (today Kresnike is a hamlet of Štore). The town only developed in the mid-19th century, when the ironworks were established in the area after coal was found in the surrounding hills.
