= Svetina =

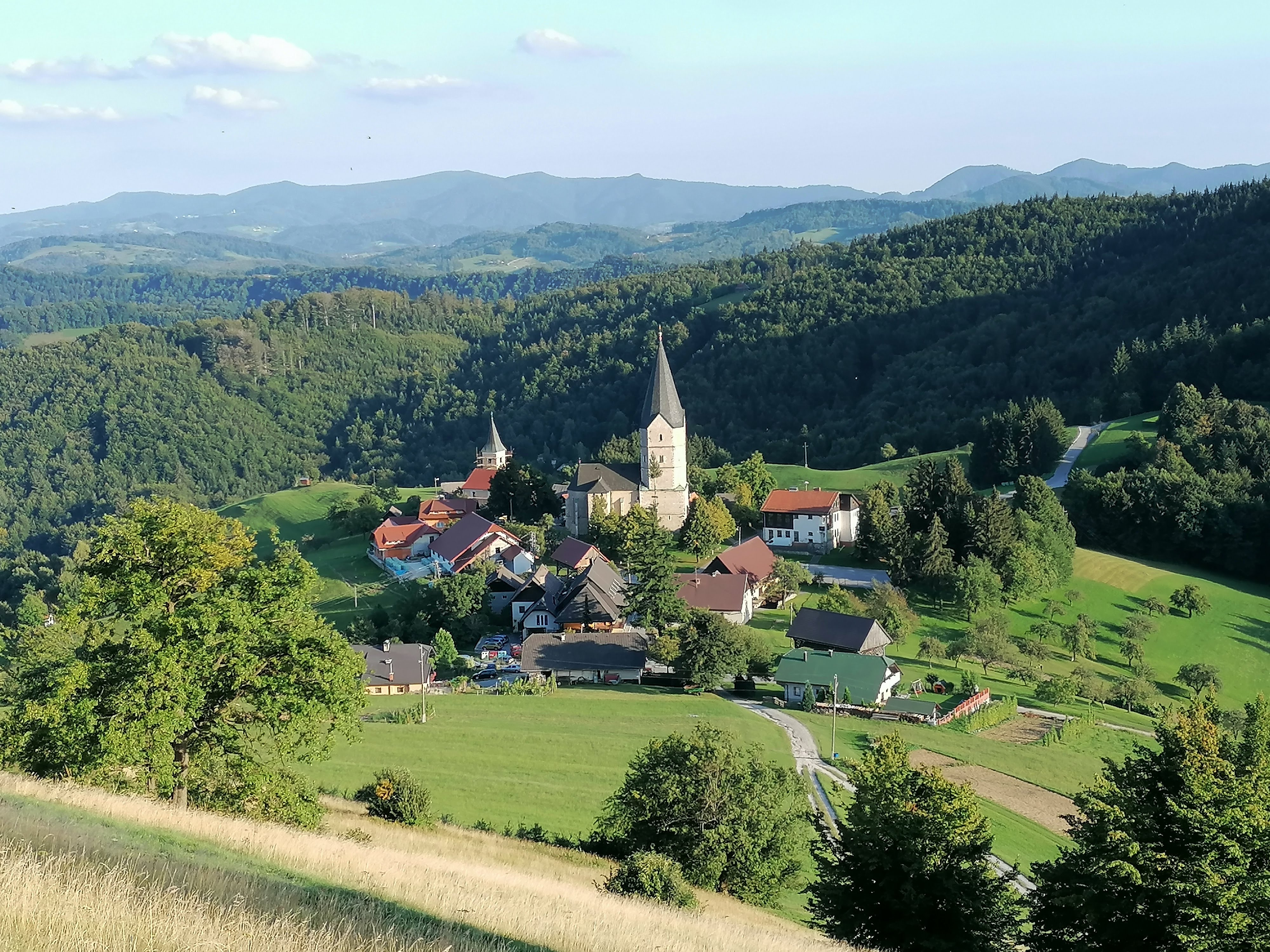

- Location in Slovenia
- Coordinates: 46°11′9.34″N 15°18′13.13″E
- Country: Slovenia
- Traditional region: Styria
- Statistical region: Savinja
- Municipality: Štore

Area
  - Total: 1.96 km^{2} (0.76 sq mi)
- Elevation: 679.2 m (2,228 ft)

Population (2002)
  - Total: 106
- Postal code: 3220

Svetina (pronounced [ˈsʋeːtina]) is a settlement in the Municipality of Štore in eastern Slovenia. It lies in the hills south of Štore. The area is part of the traditional region of Styria. It is now included with the rest of the municipality in the Savinja Statistical Region.

The parish church in the settlement is dedicated to the Mother of God and belongs to the Roman Catholic Diocese of Celje. It predates its earliest mention in written documents in 1480. Next to the church is a chapel dedicated to the Holy Cross. It dates to the late 15th century, but was extensively rebuilt after a fire in 1714 that destroyed most of the village.
