= Voglajna =

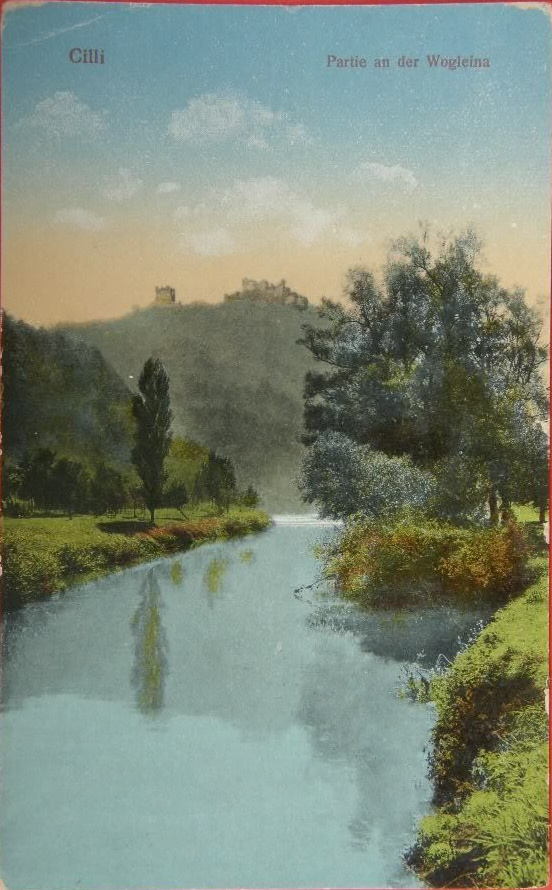
- Postcard of the Voglajna in Celje

Location
- Country: Austria, Slovenia

Physical characteristics
- Mouth
  - location: Savinja
  - coordinates: 46.2211°N 15.2662°E
- Length: 35 km (22 mi)
- Basin size: 412 km^{2} (159 sq mi)

Basin features
- Progression: Savinja→ Sava→ Danube→ Black Sea

The Voglajna (pronounced [ʋɔˈɡlaːi̯na]) is a river in Styria, Slovenia. The river is 35 kilometres (22 mi) long (including its source river, the Ločnica), and its catchment area is 412 km^{2} (159 sq mi). Its source is Lake Slivnica (Slovene: Slivniško jezero) near Slivnica pri Celju. It passes Šentjur, the ruins of Rifnik Castle, and Štore, and then merges with the Savinja River in Celje.

== See also ==
- List of rivers of Slovenia
