= Big Brother VIP (Israeli TV series) season 4 =

Big Brother VIP
- Season 4
- Presented by: Liron Weizman; Guy Zu-Aretz
- No. of days: 57
- No. of housemates: 15
- Winner: Oren Asaf Hazan
- Runner-up: Tamir Verdi

Release
- Original network: Reshet 13
- Original release: 10 July – 31 August 2021

Additional information
- Filming dates: 6 July – 31 August 2021

Season chronology
- ← Previous; Season 3

4 VIP האח הגדול (HaAh HaGadol VIP 4; lit. The Big Brother VIP 4) is the fourth VIP season of the Israeli version of the Big Brother series.

== Housemates ==
Name	Age	Famous for...	Residence	Day entered	Day exited	Status
Oren Asaf Hazan	39	Temporary housemate of Big Brother Israel season 10; Former Knesset member	Ariel	5	57	Winner
Tamir Verdi	44	Runner-up in Big Brother Israel season 4; HR Coordinator	Tel Aviv	1	57	Runner-up
Omer Barazani	29	Participated in HaMerotz LaMillion 6 and HaMerotz LaMillion 8; Medical marijuana worker	Jerusalem	1	57	3rd Place
Sarit Polak Rousseau	30	Events producer	Haifa	2	57	4th Place
Or Shpitz	24	Participated in Bake Off Israel season 2, dessert business owner and influencer	Holon	1	54	10th Evicted
Yityish "Titi" Ayanaw	30	Runner-up in Survivor season 7, Miss Israel 2013, model and TV presenter	Gondar, Ethiopia/Tel Aviv	2	52	9th Evicted
Miri Cohen	50	Influencer	Hadera	1	47	8th Evicted
Lihi Griner	36	Participated in Big Brother 3	Petah Tikva	45	46	Left
Romi Geyor	23	Participated in 2025, media interviewer	Ramat HaSharon	1	45	7th Evicted
Yaakov "Jacko" Eisenberg	40	Kokhav Nolad season 4 winner; Musician	Netanya	2	40	6th Evicted
Neta Brazani	27	Temporary housemate of Big Brother (Israeli season 9), Participated in HaMerotz LaMillion 6 & HaMerotz LaMillion 8	Jerusalem	36	37	Left
Maya Betzalel Asis	37	Participated in The Unit season 1, radio server, and panelist	Kiryat Gat	1	33	5th Evicted
Danit Grinberg	37	Participated in Big Brother 6	Tel Aviv	27	30	Left
Eyal Berkover	31	Participated in Survivor VIP 2019, model, personal trainer and nutritionist	Hod HaSharon	1	27	4th Evicted
Zipi Romano	41	Participated in Connected season 7, public relations and marketing employee	Tel Aviv/Ramat HaSharon	2	24	3rd Evicted
Dana Ron	49	Participated in Big Brother Israel season 3, Winning Couple VIP season 1, and Survivor VIP 2020; Morning show host	Tel Aviv	5	19	2nd Evicted
Roei Lulu	46	Participated in Survivor season 5, hairstylist, and makeup artist	Haifa	2	16	1st Evicted
Yaakov "Jackie" Menahem	33	Big Brother Israel season 3 winner; Printing house business owner	Ramat Gan	1	7	Walked

== Nominations table ==
	Week 1	Week 2		Week 3	Week 4			Week 5			Week 6		Week 7		Week 8	
	Week 1	Day 13	Day 17	Week 3	Day 26	Day 30		Day 37	Day 40		Day 45	Day 47	Day 51	Day 52	Final	
Oren	Eyal; Maya; Roei; Romi	No; Nominations	Tamir; Zipi	Maya; Miri	Miri; Romi	Not eligible			No; Nominations	Romi	Miri; Omer	No; Nominations	No; Nominations	No; Nominations	Winner (Day 57)	
Tamir	Not eligible	No; Nominations	Romi; Oren	Jacko; Romi	Maya; Jacko	Not eligible			No; Nominations	Jacko	Sarit; Romi	No; Nominations	No; Nominations	No; Nominations	Runner-up (Day 57)	
Omer	Not eligible	Zipi; Eyal; Romi; Roei; Titi	Zipi; Dana	Romi; Titi	Eyal; Oren	Danit	Jacko	Not eligible	No; Nominations	Romi	Oren; Titi	No; Nominations	No; Nominations	No; Nominations	Third place (Day 57)	
Sarit	Not eligible	No; Nominations	Zipi; Eyal	Titi; Tamir	Eyal; Maya	Saved		Not eligible	No; Nominations	Jacko	Oren; Romi	No; Nominations	No; Nominations	No; Nominations	Fourth place (Day 57)	
Or	Not eligible	Jacko; Eyal; Roei; Romi; Titi	Jacko; Dana	Titi; Jacko	Eyal; Titi	Saved		Not eligible	No; Nominations	Jacko	Tamir; Oren	No; Nominations	No; Nominations	No; Nominations	Evicted (Day 54)	
Titi	Not eligible	No; Nominations	Oren; Or	Tamir; Omer	Jacko; Oren	Not eligible			No; Nominations	Jacko	Miri; Romi	No; Nominations	No; Nominations	Evicted (Day 52)		
Miri	Not eligible	Sarit; Eyal; Roei; Romi; Zipi	Oren; Eyal	Tamir; Jacko	Oren; Eyal	Danit	Jacko	Jacko; Oren; Romi; Tamir; Titi	No; Nominations	Jacko	Oren; Titi	No; Nominations	Evicted (Day 47)			
Lihi	Not in house											Left (Day 46)				
Romi	Not eligible	No; Nominations	Dana; Jacko	Jacko; Tamir	Jacko; Oren	Danit	Jacko	Not eligible	No; Nominations	Not eligible	Oren; Titi	Evicted (Day 45)				
Jacko	Not eligible	Saved	Romi; Or	Oren; Zipi	Or; Romi	Danit	Romi	Miri	No; Nominations	Not eligible	Evicted (Day 40)					
Neta	Not in house							No; Nominations	Left (Day 37)							
Maya	Not eligible	No; Nominations	Zipi; Dana	Tamir; Sarit	Oren; Tamir	Danit	Romi	Evicted (Day 33)								
Danit	Not in house					Omer	Jacko; Maya; Omer; Oren; Tamir	Left (Day 30)								
Eyal	Not eligible	No; Nominations	Sarit; Or	Omer; Or	Or; Omer	Evicted (Day 27)										
Zipi	Not eligible	No; Nominations	Oren; Eyal	Miri; Omer	Evicted (Day 24)											
Dana	Eyal; Maya; Roei; Romi	No; Nominations	Oren; Maya	Evicted (Day 19)												
Roei	Not eligible	No; Nominations	Evicted (Day 16)													
Jackie	Not eligible	Walked (Day 7)														
Note	1, 2															
Against public vote	Eyal; Maya; Roei; Romi	Eyal; ~~Jacko~~; Roei; Romi; Titi; Zipi	Dana; Eyal; Or; Oren; Zipi	Jacko; Miri; Omer; Oren; Romi; Tamir; Titi; Zipi	Eyal; Or; Oren; Sarit	Jacko; Maya; Miri; Omer; ~~Or~~; Oren; ~~Sarit~~; Tamir		Miri; Omer; Oren; Romi; Tamir; Titi	Jacko; Miri; Omer; Or; Oren; Tamir; Titi	Jacko; Romi	Miri; Omer; Oren; Romi; Sarit; Tamir; Titi	All Housemates				
Left	none					Danit		Neta	none			Lihi	none			
Walked	Jackie	none														
Evicted	No; Eviction	Roei; Fewest votes to save	Dana; Fewest votes to save	Zipi; Fewest votes to save	Eyal; Fewest votes to save	Maya; Fewest votes to save		Romi; Fewest votes to save	Jacko; Fewest votes to save	Jacko; 5 of 7 votes to evict	Romi; Fewest votes to save	Miri; Fewest votes to save	Titi; Fewest votes to save	Or; Fewest votes to save	Sarit; Fewest votes (out of 4)	Omer; Fewest votes (out of 3)
Evicted	No; Eviction	Roei; Fewest votes to save	Dana; Fewest votes to save	Zipi; Fewest votes to save	Eyal; Fewest votes to save	Maya; Fewest votes to save		Romi; Fewest votes to save	Jacko; Fewest votes to save	Jacko; 5 of 7 votes to evict	Romi; Fewest votes to save	Miri; Fewest votes to save	Titi; Fewest votes to save	Or; Fewest votes to save	Sarit; Fewest votes (out of 4)	Tamir; Fewest votes (out of 2)
Evicted	No; Eviction	Roei; Fewest votes to save	Dana; Fewest votes to save	Zipi; Fewest votes to save	Eyal; Fewest votes to save	Maya; Fewest votes to save		Romi; Fewest votes to save	Jacko; Fewest votes to save	Jacko; 5 of 7 votes to evict	Romi; Fewest votes to save	Miri; Fewest votes to save	Titi; Fewest votes to save	Or; Fewest votes to save	Oren; Most votes to win	

=== Notes ===
- ^1 : As part of a secret mission, the last two housemates to enter the house, Oren and Dana, had to choose four housemates who connected the least. They chose Eyal, Maya, Romi and Roel, and as one of the consequences, the four chosen housemates entered the first eviction list of the season.
- ^2 : After only a week after Jackie entered the house and only two days after the premiere of this season, he decided to leave the house for personal reasons.

== Nominations totals received ==
	Week 1	Week 2		Week 3	Week 4		Week 5			Week 6		Week 7		Final	Total
Oren	-	-	5	1	5	1	1	-	-	5	-	-	-	Winner	18
Tamir	-	-	1	5	1	1	1	-	-	1	-	-	-	Runner-up	10
Omer	-	-	0	2	1	1	-	-	-	1	-	-	-	Third place	5
Sarit	-	1	1	1	0	0	-	-	-	1	-	-	-	Fourth place	4
Or	-	-	3	0	2	0	-	-	-	0	-	-	-	Evicted	5
Titi	-	3	0	3	1	0	1	-	-	3	-	-	Evicted		11
Miri	-	-	0	2	1	0	1	-	-	2	-	Evicted			6
Lihi	Not in house										Left				0
Romi	1	3	2	2	2	3	1	-	2	3	Evicted				19
Jacko	-	1	2	4	3	3	1	-	5	Evicted					19
Neta	Not in house						-	Left							0
Maya	1	-	1	1	1	1	Evicted								5
Danit	Not in house					5	Left								5
Eyal	1	3	3	-	4	Evicted									11
Zipi	-	1	4	1	Evicted										6
Dana	-	-	4	Evicted											4
Roei	1	3	Evicted												4
Jackie	-	Walked													0
