= Big Brother (Israeli TV series) season 5 =

Big Brother
- Season 5
- Presented by: Erez Tal; Assi Azar
- No. of days: 115
- No. of housemates: 23
- Winner: Tahounia Rubel
- Runner-up: Levana "Zoharim" Gogman
- No. of episodes: 34

Release
- Original network: Channel 2 (Keshet)
- Original release: 5 May – 27 August 2013

Season chronology
- ← Previous; Season 4 Next → Season 6

HaAh HaGadol 5 (Hebrew: האח הגדול 5; lit. The Big Brother 5) is the fifth season of the Israeli version of the reality show Big Brother. The season began broadcasting on 5 May 2013 and ended on 27 August 2013. Eighteen housemates entered the house during the premiere, and another five housemates joined after sixty-six days. It is the first season to be broadcast in 16:9 widescreen format. It was also the longest-running Israeli season at the time, lasting 115 days, until it was surpassed by season 9 which ran for 120 days.

== Housemates ==
Name	Day entered	Day exited	Status
Tahounia	1	115	Winner
Levana	1	115	Runner-up
Leon	1	115	Third Place
Dor	1	115	Fourth Place
Itay	66	115	Fifth Place
Avi	1	108	Evicted
Yarden	66	108	Evicted
Dorin	1	101	Evicted
Aharon	1	94	Evicted
Yaniv	1	94	Evicted
Or	66	87	Evicted
Didi	66	87	Evicted
Moti	66	80	Evicted
Anat	1	73	Evicted
Gili	1	57	Ejected
Shelly	1	52	Evicted
Paulina	1	44	Evicted
Dana	1	38	Evicted
Benny	1	24	Evicted
Miri	1	17	Evicted
Roni	1	16	Ejected
Dani	1	9	Evicted
Karin	1	6	Walked

=== Aharon ===
- Aharon "Bijo" Tze'etzashvili, 37, Events Producer, Kiryat Haim

=== Anat ===
- Anat Tzaig, 40, Hebrew Teacher, Tel Aviv

=== Avi ===
- Avi "Led Zeppelin" Levy, 57, Plumber, Tiberias

=== Benny ===
- Benny Goldstein, 36, Patents Inventor, Ashkelon

=== Dana ===
- Dana Ran, 40, Bookkeeper, Kiryat Tiv'on

=== Danny ===
- Danny Reichenthal, 46, Musician, Tel Aviv

=== Didi ===
- Didi Luzon, 28, work in the cosmetics business, Rishon LeZion. Didi entered the house on Day 66.

=== Dor ===
- Dor Damari, 23, Surfing Guide, Tel Aviv

=== Dorin ===
- Dorin Sagol, 32, Fashion Designer, Holon

=== Gili ===
- Gili Miley, 37, Graphic Artist, Petah Tikva. On day 57 he was Ejected from the show after insulting Anat, cursing her, and using homophobic utterances against her. Gili is the 2nd housemate that ejected from the fifth season. Roni, his father, was ejected earlier from the show, for similar reasons.

=== Itay ===
- Itay Vallach, 26, Student, Tel Aviv. Itay entered the house on Day 66.

=== Karin ===
- Karin Ben Galim, 23, Fashion Designer, Tel Aviv. chose to leave the house on day 6.

=== Leon ===
- Leon Shwabsky, 27, Fashion Store Manager, Ramat Gan

=== Levana ===
- Levana "Zoharim" Gogman, 29, Toy Store Manager, Tel Aviv

=== Miri ===
- Miri Chen, 48, Talented Youth Events Producer, Haifa

=== Moti ===
- Moti Glazer, 62, office manager, Tel Aviv. Moti entered the house on Day 66.

=== Or ===
- Or Daniel, 24, Model, Beersheba. Or entered the house on Day 66.

=== Paulina ===
- Paulina Alberstein, 28, Model, Tel Aviv

=== Roni ===
- Roni Miley, 57, Graphic Artist, Pardes Katz, Bnei Brak. on day 16 he was ejected from the show after expressing homophobic utterance during a heated conflict with lesbian housemate Levana and expressed racist utterance towards Ethiopian housemate Tahounia. Roni became the 2nd housemate to be ejected from the house in the Israeli version (after Ma'ayan Khudeda in season 2).

=== Shelly ===
- Shelly Varod, 35, Sexologist, Ramat HaSharon

=== Tahounia ===
- Tahounia Rubel, 25, Model, Beit Shemesh. The winner of the fifth series.

=== Yaniv ===
- Yaniv Avizratz, 33, Quality Control Engineer, Haifa

=== Yarden ===
- Yarden Oz, 22, Bartender, Ramat Gan. Yarden entered the house on Day 66.

== Nominations table ==
	Week 1	Week 2	Week 3	Week 4	Week 5	Week 6	Week 7	Week 8	Week 9	Week 10	Week 11	Week 12	Week 13	Week 14	Week 15	Week 16 Final	
Tahounia	Failed; Task	Roni, Paulina	Leon, Dorin	Anat	No; Nominations	Gili, Paulina	Gili, Leon	No; Nominations	No; Nominations	Dorin, Anat	Dorin, Leon	Dorin, Didi	Dorin, Dor	Leon, Dor	Levana	Winner (Day 115)	
Levana	Failed; Task	Roni, Gili	Leon, Dor	Aharon	No; Nominations	Gili, Paulina	Gili, Leon	No; Nominations	No; Nominations	Leon, Anat	Nominated	Dor, Didi	Leon, Itay	Dor, Leon	Tahounia	Runner-Up (Day 115)	
Leon	Passed; Task	Levana, Miri	Aharon, Levana	Avi	No; Nominations	Aharon, Yaniv	Aharon, Shelly	No; Nominations	No; Nominations	Aharon, Levana	Moti, Aharon	Yaniv, Or	Tahounia, Aharon	Itay, Tahounia	Dor	Third Place (Day 115)	
Dor	Passed; Task	Tahounia, Roni	Tahounia, Benny	Leon	No; Nominations	Tahounia, Aharon	Tahounia, Aharon	No; Nominations	No; Nominations	Tahounia, Aharon	Aharon, Moti	Aharon, Tahounia	Aharon, Yaniv	Tahounia, Levana	Leon	Fourth Place (Day 115)	
Itay	Not in House									Dorin, Levana	Dorin, Moti	Dorn, Yaniv	Dorin, Yaniv	Avi, Dorin	Yarden	Fifth Place (Day 115)	
Avi	Passed; Task	Roni, Miri	Benny, Aharon	Yaniv	Exempt	Paulina, Tahounia	Gili, Shelly	No; Nominations	No; Nominations	Tahounia, Yaniv	Moti, Itay	Or, Didi	Aharon, Yaniv	Itay, Dorin	Leon	Evicted (Day 108)	
Yarden	Not in House									Aharon, Yaniv	Aharon, Or	Or, Aharon	Yaniv, Aharon	Dor, Dorin	Levana	Evicted (Day 108)	
Dorin	Passed; Task	Tahounia, Dana	Tahounia, Dana	Gili	No; Nominations	Tahounia, Shelly	Tahounia, Shelly	No; Nominations	No; Nominations	Tahounia, Yaniv	Tahounia, Dorin	Tahounia, Or	Tahounia, Itay	Tahounia, Yarden	Evicted (Day 101)		
Aharon	Failed; Task	Roni, Gili	Leon, Dor	Levana	No; Nominations	Gili, Paulina	Gili, Leon	No; Nominations	No; Nominations	Leon, Anat	Leon, Avi	Leon, Dor	Yarden, Dor	Evicted (Day 94)			
Yaniv	Failed; Task	Roni, Tahounia	Benny, Leon	Avi	No; Nominations	Paulina, Anat	Leon, Gili	No; Nominations	No; Nominations	Anat, Avi	Avi, Dorin	Tahounia, Or	Leon, Itay	Evicted (Day 94)			
Or	Not in House									Leon, Avi	Leon, Yarden	Leon, Yarden	Evicted (Day 87)				
Didi	Not in House									Levana, Tahounia	Moti, Tahounia	Levana, Yaniv	Evicted (Day 87)				
Moti	Not in House									Dorin, Aharon	Leon, Didi	Evicted (Day 80)					
Anat	Failed; Task	Roni, Gili	Benny, Yaniv	Tahounia	No; Nominations	Aharon, Yaniv	Aharon, Yaniv	No; Nominations	No; Nominations	Aharon, Yaniv	Evicted (Day 73)						
Gili	Failed; Task	Tahounia, Anat	Aharon, Levana	Leon	No; Nominations	Aharon, Tahounia	Aharon, Shelly	No; Nominations	Ejected (Day 57)								
Shelly	Failed; Task	Roni, Gili	Tahounia, Dor	Avi	No; Nominations	Gili, Paulina	Leon, Gili	Evicted (Day 52)									
Paulina	Passed; Task	Tahounia, Aharon	Aharon, Tahounia	Leon	No; Nominations	Shelly, Tahounia	Evicted (Day 44)										
Dana	Passed; Task	Dorin, Benny	Benny, Dorin	Dor	No; Nominations	Evicted (Day 38)											
Benny	Passed; Task	Dana, Tahounia	Tahounia, Aharon	Evicted (Day 24)													
Miri	Passed; Task	Gili, Tahounia	Evicted (Day 17)														
Roni	Failed; Task	Anat, Avi	Ejected (Day 16)														
Dani	Failed; Task	Evicted (Day 9)															
Karin	Walked (Day 6)																
Notes	^{1}	none	^{2}	^{3}	none					^{4}	^{5}^{,}^{6}	none	^{7}	none	^{8} ^{,} ^{9}	^{10}	
Nominated for eviction	Aharon; Anat; Dani; Gili; Levana; Roni; Shelly; Tahounia; Yaniv	Anat; Dana; Gili; Miri; ~~Roni~~; Tahounia	Aharon; Benny; Gili; Leon; Tahounia	None	Aharon; Anat; Dana; Dor; Dorin; Gili; Leon; Levana; Paulina; Shelly; Tahounia; Yaniv	Aharon; Gili; Paulina; Tahounia	Aharon; Gili; Leon; Shelly	None	None	Aharon; Anat; Tahounia; Yaniv	Dorin; Leon; Levana; Moti	Didi; Or; Tahounia; Yaniv	Aharon; Dor; Dorin; Itay; Leon; Tahounia; Yaniv	Dor; Dorin; Itay; Leon; Tahounia	Avi; Dor; Itay; Leon; Tahounia; Yarden	Dor, Itay, Leon, Levana, Tahounia	
Walked	Karin	none															
Ejected	none	Roni	none					Gili	none								
Evicted	Dani; Most votes to evict	Miri; Most votes to evict	Benny; Most votes to evict	Eviction canceled	Dana; Most votes to evict	Paulina; Most votes to evict	Shelly; Most votes to evict	Eviction canceled	Eviction canceled	Anat; Most votes to evict	Moti; Most votes to evict	Didi; Most votes to evict	Yaniv; Most votes to evict	Dorin; Most votes to evict	Yarden; Most votes to evict	Itay; Fewest votes to win	Dor; Fewest votes to win
Evicted	Dani; Most votes to evict	Miri; Most votes to evict	Benny; Most votes to evict	Eviction canceled	Dana; Most votes to evict	Paulina; Most votes to evict	Shelly; Most votes to evict	Eviction canceled	Eviction canceled	Anat; Most votes to evict	Moti; Most votes to evict	Didi; Most votes to evict	Yaniv; Most votes to evict	Dorin; Most votes to evict	Yarden; Most votes to evict	Leon; Fewest votes to win	Levana; Fewest votes to win
Evicted	Dani; Most votes to evict	Miri; Most votes to evict	Benny; Most votes to evict	Eviction canceled	Dana; Most votes to evict	Paulina; Most votes to evict	Shelly; Most votes to evict	Eviction canceled	Eviction canceled	Anat; Most votes to evict	Moti; Most votes to evict	Or; Most votes to evict	Aharon; Most votes to evict	Dorin; Most votes to evict	Avi; Most votes to evict	Leon; Fewest votes to win	Levana; Fewest votes to win
Evicted	Dani; Most votes to evict	Miri; Most votes to evict	Benny; Most votes to evict	Eviction canceled	Dana; Most votes to evict	Paulina; Most votes to evict	Shelly; Most votes to evict	Eviction canceled	Eviction canceled	Anat; Most votes to evict	Moti; Most votes to evict	Or; Most votes to evict	Aharon; Most votes to evict	Dorin; Most votes to evict	Avi; Most votes to evict	Tahounia; Most votes to win	

=== Notes ===
^1 As part of a secret mission, Big Brother divided the 16 housemates into pairs, except for Roni & Gili, who entered the house as a father/son pair. The secret mission was for the housemates to convince Roni & Gili of a couples' twist this year. After one week, Big Brother asked Roni & Gili to name the couples who they thought were contriving a familial or romantic relationship, with every couple they correctly guessed automatically facing eviction. However, as they failed to realize that everyone was in a fake relationship, Roni and Gili also automatically faced eviction.
^2 As part of the "Survivor"-themed task, Big Brother split the house into two tribes. The losing tribe would go to Tribal Council and vote for one person to face the public vote. The tribe of Gili were the losers and named Gili for eviction. As Paulina won in the "Immunity challenge", she was immune from facing eviction this week.
^3 There was no eviction in Week 4. However, Big Brother asked the housemates to nominate their favourite housemates. Avi was named favourite housemate after a tiebreaker vote between himself and Leon, and his reward was immunity from Week 5's eviction, which saw everyone else in the house bar Avi face the public vote.
^4 Didi, Itay, Moti, Or and Yarden, as new housemates, are exempt from the nominations process; that is, they cannot nominate nor be nominated.
^5 Levana is automatically nominated during Week 11 for trying to coordinate nominations, and breaking the house rules because of that.
^6 In Week 11, Dorin chose to nominate herself for eviction. Therefore, she automatically entered to the nomination list.
^7 In Week 13, the housemate's love ones entered the house and chose the nomination list instead of the housemates.
^8 Avi is automatically nominated during Week 15 for telling Dorin he nominated her for eviction (in week 14 nomination), and breaking the house rules because of that.
^9 The housemates were asked to name one housemate who should get immunity from the final eviction. Levana & Leon received 2 votes each, and Itay was asked to choose between them who will get the immunity. He chose Levana, and she got the immunity.
^10 There were no nominations in the final week and the public was voting for housemates to win, rather than be evicted. the housemate with the most SMS votes was the winner.

== Nominations totals received ==
	Week 1	Week 2	Week 3	Week 4	Week 5	Week 6	Week 7	Week 8	Week 9	Week 10	Week 11	Week 12	Week 13	Week 14	Week 15	Week 16	Total
Tahounia	–	7	5	–	–	5	2	–	–	4	2	3	2	3	–	Winner	33
Levana	–	1	2	–	–	0	0	–	–	3	–	1	0	1	–	Runner-Up	8
Leon	–	0	4	–	–	0	5	–	–	3	4	2	2	2	–	Third Place	22
Dor	–	0	3	–	–	0	0	–	–	0	0	2	2	3	–	Fourth Place	10
Itay	Not in House									–	1	0	3	2	–	Fifth Place	6
Avi	–	1	0	–	–	0	0	–	–	2	2	0	0	1	–	Evicted	6
Yarden	Not in House									–	1	1	1	1	–	Evicted	4
Dorin	–	1	2	–	–	0	0	–	–	3	4	2	2	3	Evicted		17
Aharon	–	1	5	–	–	4	4	–	–	5	3	2	4	Evicted			28
Yaniv	–	0	1	–	–	2	1	–	–	4	0	3	4	Evicted			15
Or	Not in House									–	1	5	Evicted				6
Didi	Not in House									–	1	3	Evicted				4
Moti	Not in House									–	5	Evicted					5
Anat	–	2	0	–	–	1	0	–	–	4	Evicted						7
Gili	–	5	–	–	–	4	6	–	Ejected								15
Shelly	–	0	0	–	–	2	4	Evicted									6
Paulina	–	1	–	–	–	6	Evicted										7
Dana	–	2	1	–	–	Evicted											3
Benny	–	1	5	Evicted													6
Miri	–	2	Evicted														2
Roni	–	8	Ejected														8
Dani	–	Evicted															N/A
Karin	Walked																N/A
