= Big Brother (Israeli TV series) season 6 =

Big Brother
- Season 6
- Presented by: Erez Tal; Assi Azar
- No. of days: 109
- No. of housemates: 19
- Winner: Tal Gilboa
- Runner-up: Eldad Gal-Ed
- No. of episodes: 32

Release
- Original network: Channel 2 (Keshet)
- Original release: 14 May – 30 August 2014

Season chronology
- ← Previous; Season 5 Next → Season 7

HaAh HaGadol 6 (Hebrew: האח הגדול 6; lit. The Big Brother 6) is the sixth season of the Israeli version of the reality show Big Brother. The season began broadcasting on 14 May 2014 and ended on 30 August 2014. Fifteen housemates entered the house during the premiere. For the first time in Israel, four housemates from previous seasons and one ex-housemate who left the house for medical reasons came back as official housemates and competed again for the main prize.

This season also created controversy, because of the Israel-Gaza conflict, which forced the housemates, when they heard the sirens of the rockets, to go to a safe area of the house.

== Housemates ==
Name	Day entered	Day exited	Status
Tal	1	109	Winner
Eldad	1	109	Runner-up
Linor	1	109	Third Place
Danit	1	109	Fourth Place
Nofar	46	109	Fifth Place
Martine	1	102	Evicted
Achi	1	102	Evicted
Eliav	1	95	Evicted
Einav	46	95	Evicted
Mickey	1	88	Evicted
Ortal G.	46	78	Evicted
Ortal G.	1	5	Walked
Tzachi	1	74	Evicted
Menahem	46	67	Evicted
Benny	46	53	Evicted
Anna	1	46	Evicted
Doron	1	39	Evicted
Karin	1	32	Evicted
Ortal B.	1	25	Evicted
Elad	1	18	Evicted

=== Achi ===
- Achi Natan, 25, Kiryat Shmona

=== Anna ===
- Anna Bul, 26, Tel Aviv

=== Benny ===
- Benny Goldstein, 37, Ashkelon.
- He previously appeared on HaAh HaGadol 5 where he was the third evicted.

=== Danit ===
- Danit Greenberg, 22, Petah Tikva

=== Doron ===
- Doron Miran, 51, Givatayim

=== Einav ===
- Einav Boublil, 29, Ashkelon.
- She previously finished in fourth place in HaAh HaGadol 1.

=== Elad ===
- Elad "Prince" Mizrachi, 27, Netanya

=== Eldad ===
- Eldad Gal-Ed, 31, Tel Aviv (formerly from the abandoned Ganei Tal settlement in the Gaza Strip)

=== Eliav ===
- Eliav Uzan, 30, Tel Aviv (originally from Kiryat Shmona)

=== Karin ===
- Karin Zalayet, 27, Tel Aviv (originally from Givatayim)

=== Linor ===
- Linor Sheffer, 28, New York City, US (originally from Karmiel)

=== Martine ===
- Martine Solal, 57, Paris, France

=== Menahem ===
- Menahem Ben, 65, Nofim.
- He previously finished in third place on HaAh HaGadol VIP.

=== Micki ===
- Micki "Mickiyagi" Hirschmann, 46, Olesh (originally from Petah Tikva)

=== Nofar ===
- Nofar Mor, 25, Tel Aviv.
- She previously finished in third place on HaAh HaGadol 3.

=== Ortal B ===
- Ortal Ben Dayan, 32, Tel Aviv (originally from Kiryat Shmona)

=== Ortal G ===
- Ortal Goshen, 22, Lod (originally from Safed).
- On Day 5 she walked, for medical reasons. But she returned on Day 46 part of the new housemates that entered

=== Tal ===
- Tal Gilboa, 35, Kfar Saba

=== Tzachi ===
- Tzachi Ashkenazi, 33, Lod

== Nominations table ==
	Week 1	Week 2	Week 3	Week 4	Week 5	Week 6	Week 7	Week 8	Week 9	Week 10	Week 11	Week 12	Week 13	Week 14	Week 15 Final	
Tal	Nominated	Eldad; Mickey	Mickey; Martine	No; Nominations	Eldad; Linor	Eldad; Linor	Nominated	Menahem; Linor	No; Nominations	Nofar; Einav	No; Nominations	No; Nominations	Danit; Einav	Nofar; Linor	Winner (Day 109)	
Eldad	No; Nominations	Tal; Ortal B	Ortal B Doron	No; Nominations	Doron; Danit	Anna; Achi	Nominated	Menahem; Achi	No; Nominations	Tzachi; Eliav	No; Nominations	No; Nominations	Eliav; Danit	Danit; Nofar	Runner-Up (Day 109)	
Linor	No; Nominations	Ortal B Tal	Ortal B Tal	No; Nominations	Tal; Doron	Achi; Tal	Exempt	Tal; Achi	No; Nominations	Nofar; Tzachi	No; Nominations	No; Nominations	Banned	Tal; Danit	Third place (Day 109)	
Danit	No; Nominations	Eldad; Martine	Eldad; Martine	Nominated	Martine; Eldad	Eldad; Linor	Exempt	Menahem; Eldad	No; Nominations	Nofar; Linor	No; Nominations	No; Nominations	Martine; Nofar	Nofar; Linor	Fourth place (Day 109)	
Nofar	Not in House						Exempt	Ortal G Linor	No; Nominations	Danit; Linor	No; Nominations	No; Nominations	Martine; Danit	Martine; Linor	Fifth place (Day 109)	
Martine	Nominated	Karin; Tal	Tal; Karin	No; Nominations	Danit; Anna	Anna; Tal	Exempt	Danit; Achi	No; Nominations	Danit; Achi	No; Nominations	No; Nominations	Danit; Einav	Danit; Nofar	Evicted (Day 102)	
Achi	No; Nominations	Doron; Linor	Martine; Doron	Nominated	Linor; Martine	Eldad; Linor	Nominated	Linor; Menahem	No; Nominations	Linor; Eldad	No; Nominations	No; Nominations	Linor; Eldad	Linor; Nofar	Evicted (Day 102)	
Eliav	No; Nominations	Martine; Eldad	Martine; Tal	No; Nominations	Tal; Linor	Eldad; Linor	Exempt	Eldad; Linor	No; Nominations	Eldad; Linor	No; Nominations	No; Nominations	Eldad; Linor	Evicted (Day 95)		
Einav	Not in House						Exempt	Martine; Mickey	No; Nominations	Mickey; Linor	No; Nominations	No; Nominations	Linor; Martine	Evicted (Day 95)		
Mickey	No; Nominations	Ortal B Karin	Ortal B Tal	No; Nominations	Tal; Doron	Tal; Achi	Nominated	Tal; Menahem	No; Nominations	Einav; Tzachi	No; Nominations	No; Nominations	Evicted (Day 88)			
Ortal G	~~Nominated~~	Walked (Day 5)					Exempt	Menahem; Linor	No; Nominations	Nofar; Eliav	No; Nominations	Evicted (Day 78)				
Tzachi	Nominated	Danit; Eldad	Anna; Danit	No; Nominations	Anna; Tal	Linor; Tal	Exempt	Eldad; Linor	No; Nominations	Eldad; Linor	Evicted (Day 74)					
Menahem	Not in House						Nominated	Eldad; Ortal G	No; Nominations	Evicted (Day 67)						
Benny	Not in House						Nominated	Evicted (Day 53)								
Anna	No; Nominations	Doron; Martine	Eldad; Martine	Nominated	Eldad; Martine	Eldad; Mickey	Evicted (Day 46)									
Doron	Nominated	Karin; Achi	Eldad; Achi	No; Nominations	Eldad; Anna	Evicted (Day 39)										
Karin	No; Nominations	Doron; Linor	Anna; Linor	Nominated	Evicted (Day 32)											
Ortal B	Nominated	Eldad; Elad	Eldad; Martine	Evicted (Day 25)												
Elad	Nominated	Ortal B Eldad	Evicted (Day 18)													
Notes	^{1}	^{2}	^{3}	^{4}	^{5}	^{6}^{,}^{7}	^{8}	^{9}^{,}^{10}^{,}^{11}		^{12}	^{13}^{,}^{14}		^{15}^{,}^{16}	^{17}^{,}^{18}	^{19}	
Nominated for eviction	Doron; Elad; Martine; Ortal B ~~Ortal G~~; Tal; Tzachi	Doron; Elad; Eldad; Karin; Martine; Ortal B Tal	Doron; Eldad; Martine; Ortal B Tal	Achi; Anna; Danit; Karin	Anna; Doron; Eldad; Linor; Martine; Tal	Achi; Anna; Danit; Eldad; Linor; Tal	Achi; Benny; Eldad; Menahem; Mickey; Tal	Achi; Eldad; Linor; Menahem; Tal		Eliav; Eldad; Linor; Nofar; Tzachi	All; Housemates		Danit; Einav; Eldad; Eliav; Linor; Martine	Achi; Danit; Linor; Martine; Nofar; Tal	Danit; Eldad; Linor; Nofar; Tal	
Walked	Ortal G	none														
Evicted	Eviction cancelled	Elad; Fewest votes to save	Ortal B Fewest votes to save	Karin; Fewest votes to save	Doron; Fewest votes to save	Anna; Fewest votes to save	Benny; Fewest votes to save	Eviction postponed	Menahem; Fewest votes to save	Tzachi; Fewest votes to save	Ortal G Fewest votes to save	Mickey; Fewest votes to save	Einav; Fewest votes to save	Achi; Fewest votes to save	Nofar; Fewest votes to win	Danit; Fewest votes to win
Evicted	Eviction cancelled	Elad; Fewest votes to save	Ortal B Fewest votes to save	Karin; Fewest votes to save	Doron; Fewest votes to save	Anna; Fewest votes to save	Benny; Fewest votes to save	Eviction postponed	Menahem; Fewest votes to save	Tzachi; Fewest votes to save	Ortal G Fewest votes to save	Mickey; Fewest votes to save	Einav; Fewest votes to save	Achi; Fewest votes to save	Linor; Fewest votes to win	Eldad; Fewest votes to win
Evicted	Eviction cancelled	Elad; Fewest votes to save	Ortal B Fewest votes to save	Karin; Fewest votes to save	Doron; Fewest votes to save	Anna; Fewest votes to save	Benny; Fewest votes to save	Eviction postponed	Menahem; Fewest votes to save	Tzachi; Fewest votes to save	Ortal G Fewest votes to save	Mickey; Fewest votes to save	Eliav; Fewest votes to save	Martine; Fewest votes to save	Linor; Fewest votes to win	Eldad; Fewest votes to win
Evicted	Eviction cancelled	Elad; Fewest votes to save	Ortal B Fewest votes to save	Karin; Fewest votes to save	Doron; Fewest votes to save	Anna; Fewest votes to save	Benny; Fewest votes to save	Eviction postponed	Menahem; Fewest votes to save	Tzachi; Fewest votes to save	Ortal G Fewest votes to save	Mickey; Fewest votes to save	Eliav; Fewest votes to save	Martine; Fewest votes to save	Tal; Most votes to win	

=== Notes ===
- ^1 This week, the public did the nominating. The seven housemates with the most votes were up for eviction.
- ^2 Elad was nominated by public voting.
- ^3 Doron was nominated by public voting.
- ^4 This week, the public did the nominating. the four housemates with the fewest votes were up for eviction.
- ^5 Myakiagi won immunity due to his win in the Raising Star task.
- ^6 Prior to week 6's task, the housemates decided that Martine will be immune from eviction and Danit is up for eviction.
- ^7 Anna was nominated by public voting.
- ^8 Based on 2014 FIFA World Cup, each housemate represented a country. To get immunity, their countries had to pass to the quarter-finals. Einav (Argentina), Martine (France), Linor (Belgium), Tzachi (Germany), Nofar (Netherlands), Eliav (Brazil), Danit (Costa Rica) and Ortal G (Colombia) won immunity. All the non-immune were nominated.
- ^9 Nominations had the same format as last week. Although this time, only the housemates that represented countries that passed to the semi-finals would be immune. For that, only Einav, Tzachi, Nofar and Eliav were immunes. Unlike last week, housemates not immunes were not nominated. They were only eligible to be nominated.
- ^10 Tal was nominated by public voting.
- ^11 The eviction was originally to be on Saturday, Day 60. Although, it was postponed for Wednesday, Day 64 because the news program got 30-minute extra because of the Israel-Gaza conflict. On Wednesday, the eviction was postponed for Saturday, Day 67. As a result, week 9 nominees were the same as Week 8.
- ^12 Eliav was nominated by public voting.
- ^13 All Housemates are up for eviction as two will be evicted, one on Wednesday and one on Saturday.
- ^14 The second eviction was originally to be on Saturday, Day 81. Although, it was postponed once again for Wednesday, Day 85 because the news program got extra time. On Wednesday, the eviction was postponed for Saturday, Day 88. As a result, week 12 nominees were the same as week 11.
- ^15 Linor was banned from nominating because while in the House, her sister told her to nominate Achi and Danit. Later, Big Brother called her to the Diary Room and asked her two nominees. She said Achi and Danit, confirming what her sister told her.
- ^16 Eliav was nominated by public voting.
- ^17 Prior to this week's task Eldad qualified for the finale.
- ^18 Achi was nominated by public voting.
- ^19 There were no nominations in the final week and the public was voting for housemates to win, rather than being saved. The housemate with the most SMS votes was the winner.

== Nominations totals received ==
	Week 1	Week 2	Week 3	Week 4	Week 5	Week 6	Week 7	Week 8	Week 10	Week 11	Week 13	Week 14	Week 15	Total
Tal	–	3	4	–	4	4	–	2	0	–	0	1	Winner	18
Eldad	–	6	4	–	4	4	–	4	3	–	2	0	Runner-up	27
Linor	–	2	1	–	3	4	–	6	6	–	3	4	3rd place	29
Danit	–	1	1	–	2	–	–	1	2	–	4	3	4th place	14
Nofar	Not in House						–	–	4	–	1	5	5th place	10
Martine	–	3	6	–	3	–	–	1	0	–	3	1	Evicted	17
Achi	–	1	1	–	0	3	–	3	1	–	0	0	Evicted	9
Eliav	–	0	0	–	0	0	–	–	2	–	1	Evicted		3
Einav	Not in House						–	–	2	–	2	Evicted		4
Mickey	–	1	1	–	–	1	–	1	1	–	Evicted			5
Ortal G	–	Walked					–	2	0	–	Evicted			2
Tzachi	–	0	0	–	0	0	–	–	3	Evicted				3
Menahem	Not in House						–	6	Evicted					6
Benny	Not in House						–	Evicted						N/A
Anna	–	0	2	–	3	2	Evicted							7
Doron	–	3	2	–	3	Evicted								8
Karin	–	3	1	–	Evicted									4
Ortal B	–	4	3	Evicted										7
Elad	–	1	Evicted											1
