= Maggie Tabibi =

Israeli television presenter and news anchor

- מגי טביבי
- Born: Margaret Kakouli; 3 January 1995 (age 31); Holon, Israel
- Alma mater: College of Management Academic Studies
- Occupations: Television presenter; News anchor; Actress
- Years active: 2018–present
- Employer: Channel 14
- Partner: Avi Kakhon

Margaret "Maggie" Tabibi (Hebrew: מרגרט "מגי" טביבי; born 3 January 1995, 2 Shevat 5755) is an Israeli television presenter and the anchor of the main newscast on Channel 14. She first became known for appearing on the ninth season of the reality programme Big Brother on Reshet 13.

== Biography ==
Tabibi was born Margaret Kakouli in Holon. In her youth she was a competitive long-distance swimmer with Hapoel Holon, and was runner-up in the Israeli under-16 girls' championship in the 3-kilometre open-water swim at a competition held in Eilat. She later competed on Israel's long-distance running team. She completed her service in the Israel Defense Forces in the crossings unit of the Military Police Corps. Tabibi holds a bachelor's degree in law from the College of Management Academic Studies.

=== Television career ===
In 2018 she took part in the ninth season of the reality television programme Big Brother on Reshet 13. She entered the house at the beginning of the season and was the sixth contestant evicted. Although she entered the house while in a relationship, a relationship developed during the programme between her and fellow contestant Israel Ogalbo, which ended shortly after he left the house. After rising to public attention, Tabibi signed as an actress with the ADD agency and began studying acting at the studio of Gal Amitai. She made a guest appearance in the series Gibor Amiti ("A Real Hero") on yes Kidz, appeared in the series Lama Mi Met on yes in the role of Oshrat, and hosted the programmes Dash im Shir and Metukim on Channel 24.

In November 2021 she was chosen to present the main newscast of Channel 14 (then still known as Channel 20) alongside Yonatan Ohayon.

In June 2022, with the launch of Channel 14's new schedule, Tabibi was chosen to present the channel's main newscast on her own. In March 2023 Sharon Gal began presenting the programme alongside her. In May 2024 she returned to anchoring the newscast alone.

In April 2024 she was named to Forbes Israel's list of promising young people, the Forbes 30 Under 30 list.

In October 2025 she was voted Israel's favourite news presenter in a Maariv Online readers' poll, in which she received 33.2% of the vote, a margin of about 13 percentage points over second place.

Alongside her television work, she ran her own jewellery brand, MAG, which operated for about two years.

In November 2025 she said that while washing her car she discovered that a tracking device had been attached to it, and that the matter was under police investigation.

=== Events and ceremonies ===
- In March 2023 she was chosen to host the state memorial ceremony for those killed and wounded in acts of terrorism, held on Yom HaZikaron.
- In May 2023 she hosted the state ceremony marking 56 years since the liberation and reunification of Jerusalem, together with Aviv Alush.
- In May 2024 she hosted the torch-lighting ceremony at Mount Herzl on Israel's 76th Independence Day, together with Tamir Steinman.
- In December 2024 she hosted the state ceremony for the Carmel disaster.
- In April 2025 she hosted the Israel Prize award ceremony on Israel's 77th Independence Day, together with Almog Boker.
- In April 2026 she hosted the Yom HaZikaron ceremony for Israel's fallen soldiers.

=== Personal life ===
Tabibi lives in Holon with her partner, Avi Kakhon. She has said that she is in the process of becoming more religious.
