= Big Brother (Israeli TV series) season 7 =

Big Brother
- Season 7
- Presented by: Erez Tal; Korin Gideon
- No. of days: 113
- No. of housemates: 22
- Winner: Shai Mika Yifrah
- Runner-up: Barak Edri
- No. of episodes: 33

Release
- Original network: Channel 2 (Keshet)
- Original release: 16 December 2015 – 6 April 2016

Season chronology
- ← Previous; Season 6 Next → Season 8

HaAh HaGadol 7 (Hebrew: האח הגדול 7; lit. The Big Brother 7) is the seventh season of the Israeli version of the reality show Big Brother. The season began broadcasting on 16 December 2015. 16 housemates entered the house during the premiere. This season had a Timebomb theme, like Big Brother 16 (UK).

Following the departure of co-host Assi Azar, he was replaced by female host Korin Gideon beginning this season, along with veteran host Erez Tal.

== Housemates ==
Name	Day entered	Day exited	Status
Shay M.	1	113	Winner
Barak	1	113	Runner-up
Omri	1	113	Third Place
Dudu	1	113	Fourth Place
Ksenia	1	109	Evicted
Or	1	95	Evicted
Itzik	53	86	Walked
Tania	25	86	Walked
Shay H.	1	86	Walked
Rinat	53	81	Evicted
Arbel	25	74	Walked
Esti-Lee	53	67	Evicted
Shahar	53	61	Walked
Michael	1	60	Evicted
Flory	1	56	Walked
Corinne	1	46	Evicted
Gil & Gili	1	39	Evicted
Tamar	1	32	Evicted
Salim	1	25	Evicted
Omer	1	17	Evicted
Ilana	1	11	Evicted

=== Arbel ===
- Arbel Kaynan 22, Tel Aviv. Entered the house on Day 25.

=== Barak ===
- Barak Edri 25, Tzora.

=== Corinne ===
- Corinne "Coco" Abisdris 29, Jerusalem.

=== Dudu ===
- Dudu Cohen 33, Afula.

=== Esti-Lee ===
- Esti-Lee Paz 29, Udim. Entered the house on Day 53.

=== Flory ===
- Flory Elkaslassi 38, Ramla.

=== Gil ===
- Gil Almog 27, Tel Aviv.

=== Gili ===
- Gili Cohen 42, Holon.

=== Ilana ===
- Ilana Kaspov 54, Nahariya.

=== Itzik ===
- Itzik "Carlos" Carasenti 46, Haifa. Entered the house on Day 53.

=== Ksenia ===
- Ksenia Tarantul 28, Lod (originally from Russia).

=== Michael ===
- Michael "Mikey" Elroy 25, Tel Aviv.

=== Omer ===
- Omer Kaynan 22, Tel Aviv.

=== Omri ===
- Omri Ben-Natan 29, Ramat Gan.

=== Or ===
- Or Sujunov 35, Tel Aviv, (originally from New York City).

=== Rinat ===
- Rinat Fleischer 45, Rishon LeZion. Entered the house on Day 53.

=== Salim ===
- Salim Marei 40, Tel Aviv.

=== Shahar ===
- Shahar Hefetz 35, Gedera. Entered the house on Day 53.

=== Shai H. ===
- Shai Hai 32, Herzliya.

=== Shay M. ===
- Shay Mika Ifrah 23, Katzrin.

=== Tamar ===
- Tamar Shiloh 30, Tel Aviv.

=== Tania ===
- Tania "Tani" Gerber 23, Herzliya. Entered the house on Day 25.

== Nominations table ==
	Week 1	Week 2	Week 3	Week 4	Week 5	Week 6	Week 7	Week 8	Week 9	Week 10	Week 11	Week 12	Week 13	Week 14	Week 15	Final Week 16	
Shay M.	Salim; Shay H.	Salim; Shay H.	Salim; Shay H.	Shay H. Tamar	Exempt	Shay H. Tania	No; Nominations	Tania; Shay H.	Esti-Lee; Itzik	No; Nominations	No; Nominations	Itzik; Tania	Barak; Or	No; Nominations	No; Nominations	Winner (Day 113)	
Barak	Omer; Salim	Salim; Gil & Gili	Michael; Shay H.	Shay H. Michael	Exempt	Tania; Arbel	No; Nominations	Arbel; Shay H.	Shay H. Tania	No; Nominations	No; Nominations	Itzik; Tania	Shay M. Ksenia	No; Nominations	No; Nominations	Runner-Up (Day 113)	
Omri	Salim; Shay H.	Shay H. Salim	Refused	Shay H. Michael	Exempt	Tania; Shay H.	No; Nominations	Michael; Or	Esti-Lee; Rinat	No; Nominations	No; Nominations	Itzik; Tania	Omri; Or	No; Nominations	No; Nominations	Third place (Day 113)	
Dudu	Salim; Or	Shay H. Or	Shay H. Tamar	Shay H. Tamar	Nominated	Arbel; Corinne	No; Nominations	Michael; Arbel	Esti-Lee; Rinat	No; Nominations	No; Nominations	Itzik; Tania	Or; Ksenia	No; Nominations	No; Nominations	Fourth place (Day 113)	
Ksenia	Michael; Salim	Flory; Gil & Gili	Refused	Shay H. Gil & Gili	Exempt	Tania; Flory	No; Nominations	Michael; Arbel	Rinat; Itzik	No; Nominations	No; Nominations	Itzik; Tania	Barak; Or	No; Nominations	No; Nominations	Evicted (Day 109)	
Or	Omer; Shay H.	Shay H. Omer	Refused	Shay H. Flory	Exempt	Tania; Shay H.	No; Nominations	Tania; Shay H.	Shay H. Tania	No; Nominations	No; Nominations	Itzik; Tania	Ksenia; Shay M.	Evicted (Day 95)			
Itzik	Not in House							Michael; Arbel	Esti-Lee; Ksenia	No; Nominations	No; Nominations	Omri; Or	Walked (Day 86)				
Tania	Not in House			Or; Omri	Nominated	Or; Corinne	No; Nominations	Michael; Or	Esti-Lee; Or	No; Nominations	No; Nominations	Or; Barak	Walked (Day 86)				
Shay H.	Omer; Omri	Omri; Michael	Or; Omri	Omri; Shay M.	Nominated	Corinne; Or	No; Nominations	Or; Michael	Or; Esti-Lee	No; Nominations	No; Nominations	Barak; Or	Walked (Day 86)				
Rinat	Not in House							Michael; Or	Esti-Lee; Omri	No; Nominations	No; Nominations	Evicted (Day 81)					
Arbel	Not in House			Flory; Or	Nominated	Tania; Flory	No; Nominations	Michael; Or	Esti-Lee; Itzik	No; Nominations	Walked (Day 74)						
Esti-Lee	Not in House							Shay M. Arbel	Rinat; Itzik	Evicted (Day 67)							
Shahar	Not in House							Michael; Omri	Walked (Day 61)								
Michael	Salim; Ilana	Omer; Salim	Refused	Shay H. Omri	Nominated	Tania; Shay H.	No; Nominations	Tania; Shay H.	Evicted (Day 60)								
Flory	Salim; Shay H.	Shay H. Omer	Ksenia; Tamar	Shay H. Tamar	Nominated	Or; Arbel	No; Nominations	Walked (Day 56)									
Corinne	Omer; Ilana	Shay H. Omer	Michael; Shay H.	Shay H. Gil & Gili	Exempt	Shay H. Tania	Evicted (Day 46)										
Gil & Gili	Salim; Omer	Omer; Salim	Salim; Tamar	Shay H. Corinne	Nominated	Evicted (Day 39)											
Tamar	Omer; Salim	Shay H. Salim	Refused	Shay H. Gil & Gili	Evicted (Day 32)												
Salim	Gil & Gili; Flory	Omer; Gil & Gili	Refused	Evicted (Day 25)													
Omer	Or; Shay H.	Shay H. Or	Evicted (Day 17)														
Ilana	Salim; Shay H.	Evicted (Day 11)															
Notes	1,2	none	3,4	none	5,6	none	7	none	8	9	10	11,12	13	none			
Nominated (pre-save and replace)	Dudu; Ilana; Omer; Omri; Or; Salim; Shay H.	Dudu; Gil & Gili; Omer; Salim; Shay H.	All; Housemates	Dudu; Gil & Gili; Omri; Shay H. Tamar	Arbel; Dudu; Gil & Gili; Ksenia; Michael; Shay H. Tania	Arbel; Corinne; Dudu; Or; Shay H. Tania	None	Arbel; Dudu; Michael; Or; Shay H.	Dudu; Esti-Lee; Itzik; Or; Rinat; Shay H. Tania	None	Dudu; Itzik; Ksenia; Omri; Or; Rinat; Shay H. Shay M. Tania	Barak; Itzik; Or; Shay H. Tania	Barak; Ksenia; Or; Shay M.	None	Barak; Ksenia; Omri; Shay M.	Barak; Dudu; Omri; Shay M.	
Saved	Shay H.	Gil & Gili	~~Corinne~~	Gil & Gili	Ksenia	Dudu	None	Dudu	Rinat	None	None	Or	None	None	None		
Against public vote	Dudu; Flory; Ilana; Omer; Omri; Or; Salim	Dudu; Ksenia; Omer; Salim; Shay H.	All; Housemates	Dudu; Ksenia; Omri; Shay H. Tamar	Arbel; Dudu; Flory; Gil & Gili; Michael; Shay H. Tania	Arbel; Corinne; Michael; Or; Shay H. Tania	None	Arbel; Michael; Omri; Or; Shay H.	Dudu; Esti-Lee; Itzik; Omri; Or; Shay H. Tania	None	None	Barak; Itzik; Omri; Shay H. Tania	None	None	None		
Walked	none							Flory	Shahar	Arbel	none	Itzik; Tania; Shay H.					
Evicted	Ilana; Fewest votes to save	Omer; Fewest votes to save	Salim; Fewest votes to save	Tamar; Fewest votes to save	Gil & Gili; Fewest votes to save	Corinne; Fewest votes to save	Dudu; Shay H. Fake eviction	Michael; Fewest votes to save	Esti-Lee; Fewest votes to save	No eviction	Rinat; Fewest votes to save	Eviction cancelled	Or; Fewest votes to save	No eviction	Ksenia; Fewest votes to save	Dudu; Fewest votes to win	Omri; Fewest votes to win
Evicted	Ilana; Fewest votes to save	Omer; Fewest votes to save	Salim; Fewest votes to save	Tamar; Fewest votes to save	Gil & Gili; Fewest votes to save	Corinne; Fewest votes to save	Dudu; Shay H. Fake eviction	Michael; Fewest votes to save	Esti-Lee; Fewest votes to save	No eviction	Rinat; Fewest votes to save	Eviction cancelled	Or; Fewest votes to save	No eviction	Ksenia; Fewest votes to save	Barak; Fewest votes to win	Shay M. Most votes to win

=== Notes ===
- ^1 Dudu, as the first to enter in the house, had to choose various positions for the housemates, which would have consequences. Throughout the first week the positions could be changed, and in the end, Shay H. has to always nominate publicly, Gil and Gili will compete as a 2-in-1 housemate, Dudu is automatically nominated forever and Barak won immunity to the end of the season, meaning he is the first finalist.
- ^2 Every week, Big Brother will host a Big Brother Games in the Time Room where the tenant who is up for eviction will have the opportunity to save themselves and add another tenant instead of them.
- ^3 All housemates were on eviction list because some of them refused to perform in a public vote that took place prior to the week 3 task.
- ^4 Despite the victory of Coco in Big Brother Games, the housemates were informed that an error was discovered in the vote, therefore, she is no longer immune.
- ^5 Prior to week 5 task the housemates were divided into groups: group Red and group Blue and compete in missions. In the last mission, the group (Red) that lost is up for evection and the group (Blue) that won were immune.
- ^6 Since Ksenia was in team Red she was nominated but she won Big Brother Games, and became immune and she put Flory who was in team Blue and was originally immune up for eviction instead of her.
- ^7 Big Brother informed the housemates that Saturday nights eviction will be double and For the first time in the history of Big Brother who decides who are the two housemates to leave the house, they are none other than new housemates entering Saturday, however, the housemates don't know that this eviction is false and part of week 8 task Sherlock Holmes.
- ^8 The housemates nominated face-to-face.
- ^9 Arbel Kaynan sprained her ankle after she stumbled earlier in the day, Arbel received immediate medical treatment at Hadassah Hospital in Jerusalem and her leg was put in a cast but in view of her medical condition she is not able to continue the program, after 52 days Arbel decided to leave the house.
- ^10 Due to Omri breaking the China Wall that was made during week/task 10, Big Brother informed the housemates that there will be Serious implications, all housemates are up to eviction and the budget will be cut 30% until the end of the season, in addition, this week there is no Big Brother Games.
- ^11 As part of the week 11 task family members of housemates attended the house in order to the housemates to succeed in the task and earn an extra budget of 20%, they had to replace positions given at the beginning of the season. Now Itzik has to always nominate publicly, Shay H. is automatically nominated forever and Dudu won immunity to the end of the season, meaning he is the first official finalist.
- ^12 On Day 86, Shay Hay intentionally kicked art installation made by housemate Or Sujunov after claims of Boycott and allegations of verbal abuse from the housemates towards Shay Hay, Tania and Itzik, Shay Hay asked to leave the house and Big Brother agreed to the request (had Shay Hay didn't request to leave he would have been required to leave the house anyway because he violated the format's rules for the second time). Following the departure of Shay Hay, his partner Tania and his friend Itzik also departed the house. Following these events, for the first time ever, Big Brother finale will have only 4 finalists.
- ^13 As of week 13 there will be no longer Big Brother Games.

== Nominations totals received ==
	Week 1	Week 2	Week 3	Week 4	Week 5	Week 6	Week 7	Week 8	Week 9	Week 10	Week 11	Week 12	Week 13	Week 14	Week 15	Week 16	Total
Shay M.	0	0	0	1	–	0	–	1	0	–	–	0	2	–	–	Winner	4
Barak	Immune											2	2	–	–	Runner-Up	4
Omri	1	1	1	3	–	0	–	1	1	–	–	1	1	–	–	3rd Place	10
Dudu	-						–	-		–	–	Immune				4th Place	N/A
Ksenia	0	0	1	0	–	0	–	0	1	–	–	0	3	–	–	Evicted	5
Or	2	2	1	2	–	3	–	5	2	–	–	3	4	Evicted			24
Itzik	Not in House							–	4	–	–	6	Walked				10
Tania	Not in House			–	–	8	–	3	2	–	–	6	Walked				18
Shai H.	6	8	4	11	–	5	–	4	2	–	–	-	Walked				40
Rinat	Not in House							–	4	–	–	Evicted					4
Arbel	Not in House			–	–	3	–	5	0	–	Walked						8
Esti-Lee	Not in House							–	8	Evicted							8
Shahar	Not in House							–	Walked								N/A
Michael	1	1	2	2	–	0	–	9	Evicted								15
Flory	1	1	0	2	–	2	–	Walked									6
Corinne	0	0	0	1	–	3	Evicted										4
Gil & Gili	1	2	0	3	–	Evicted											6
Tamar	0	0	3	3	Evicted												6
Salim	10	6	2	Evicted													18
Omer	6	6	Evicted														12
Ilana	2	Evicted															2
