= Big Brother (Israeli TV series) season 8 =

Big Brother
- Season 8
- Presented by: Erez Tal; Korin Gideon
- No. of days: 101
- No. of housemates: 19
- Winner: Avihai Ohana
- Runner-up: Shani Goldshtein
- No. of episodes: 30

Release
- Original network: Channel 2 (Keshet)
- Original release: 18 December 2016 – 28 March 2017

Season chronology
- ← Previous; Season 7 Next → Season 9

HaAh HaGadol 8 (Hebrew: האח הגדול 8; lit. The Big Brother 8) is the eighth season of the Israeli version of the reality show Big Brother. It's the final season in Keshet. The season began broadcasting on 18 December 2016 and finished on 28 March 2017.

== Housemates ==
Name	Day entered	Day exited	Status
Avihai	1	101	Winner
Shani	1	101	Runner-up
Haim	1	101	Third Place
Sharon	59	101	Fourth Place
Maayan	1	101	Fifth Place
Orna	38	99	Evicted
Orna	1	38	Evicted
Dan	1	94	Evicted
Omer	59	94	Evicted
Jodi	59	87	Evicted
Indal	1	80	Evicted
Eden	1	80	Evicted
Anastasia	59	73	Evicted
Shem	1	66	Evicted
Talin	1	52	Evicted
Hezi	38	45	Evicted
Hezi	1	24	Evicted
Shmulik & Kokhav	38	45	Evicted
Shmulik & Kokhav	1	31	Evicted
Tehila	38	45	Evicted
Tehila	1	17	Evicted
Ester	1	10	Evicted

=== Anastasia ===
- Anastasia Tal 23, Netanya (originally from Belarus).

=== Avihai ===
- Avihai Ohana 27, Eilat.

=== Dan ===
- Dan Rushansky 28, Tel Aviv (originally from Herzliya).

=== Eden ===
- Eden Saban 21, Ashdod (originally from Sde Uziyahu).

=== Ester ===
- Ester Liberzon Namer 36, Kfar Saba (originally from Lehavim).

=== Haim ===
- Haim Shuei 25, Beit She'an.

=== Hezi ===
- Hezi Haim 35, Tel Aviv (originally from Rehovot).

=== Indal ===
- Indal Kabada 25, Ashdod.

=== Jodi ===
- Jodi Amer 24, Jerusalem (originally from Norway).

=== Kokhav ===
- Kokhav Perry Sapan 56, Givataim.

=== Maayan ===
- Maayan Ashkenazi 25, Herzliya.

=== Omer ===
- Omer Gordon 36, Haifa.

=== Orna ===
- Orna Danino 38, Petah Tikva (originally from Bnei Brak).

=== Shani ===
- Shani Goldshtein 25, Tel Aviv.

=== Sharon ===
- Sharon Gal 42, Giv'at Shmuel.

=== Shem ===
- Shem Bardugo 30, Tel Aviv.

=== Shmulik ===
- Shmulik Sapan 58, Givataim (originally from Tirat Carmel).

=== Talin ===
- Talin Abu Hana 21, Tel Aviv (originally from Nazareth).

=== Tehila ===
- Tehila Asudry 32, Ramat Gan (originally from Netanya, Los Angeles & New York City).

== Nominations table ==
	Week 1	Week 2	Week 3	Week 4	Week 5	Week 6	Week 7	Week 9	Week 10	Week 11	Week 12	Week 13	Week 14		
	Week 1	Week 2	Week 3	Week 4	Week 5	Week 6	Week 7	Week 9	Week 10	Week 11	Week 12	Week 13	Day 99	Final	
Avihai	Ester; Dan	No; Nominations	Shani; Talin	Shani; Talin	Eden; Shani	No; Nominations	No; Nominations	Eden; Shem	Eden; Shani	Nominated	Jodi; Shani	Shani; Sharon	Nominated	Winner (Day 101)	
Shani	Orna; Talin	Nominated	Haim; S. & K.	S. & K. Eden	Orna; Avihai	No; Nominations	No; Nominations	Avihai; Orna	Avihai; Orna	Nominated	Orna; Sharon	Dan; Sharon	Nominated	Runner-Up (Day 101)	
Haim	Shani; Shem	No; Nominations	Shem; Shani	Shani; Talin	Shem; Shani	No; Nominations	No; Nominations	Shani; Shem	Anastasia; Shani	Nominated	Omer; Shani	Omer; Shani	Nominated	Third place (Day 101)	
Sharon	Not In; House							Shani; Shem	Indal; Shani	Nominated	Omer; Shani	Omer; Shani	Nominated	Fourth place (Day 101)	
Maayan	Shem; Tehila	Nominated	Hezi; Shem	S. & K. Eden	Shem; Eden	No; Nominations	No; Nominations	Shani; Shem	Shani; Jodi	Nominated	Jodi; Shani	Omer; Sharon	Nominated	Fifth place (Day 101)	
Orna	Indal; Shem	Nominated	Hezi; S. & K.	S. & K. Eden	Shem; Shani	Nominated	No; Nominations	Shani; Shem	Anastasia; Shani	Nominated	Omer; Shani	Omer; Sharon	Nominated	Evicted (Day 99)	
Dan	Shem; Tehila	Nominated	Hezi; Eden	Shani; S. & K.	Shem; Indal	No; Nominations	No; Nominations	Shani; Shem	Anastasia; Shani	Nominated	Jodi; Shani	Omer; Shani	Evicted (Day 94)		
Omer	Not In; House							Avihai; Orna	Orna; Jodi	Immune	Orna; Sharon	Orna; Sharon	Evicted (Day 94)		
Jodi	Not In; House							Dan; Orna	Orna; Sharon	Nominated	Avihai; Maayan	Evicted (Day 87)			
Indal	Orna; Maayan	Nominated	Hezi; Shem	Dan; Avihai	Dan; Avihai	No; Nominations	No; Nominations	Avihai; Dan	Omer; Sharon	Nominated	Evicted (Day 80)				
Eden	Orna; Maayan	No; Nominations	Orna; Shani	Shani; Talin	Orna; Maayan	No; Nominations	No; Nominations	Avihai; Dan	Avihai; Sharon	Nominated	Evicted (Day 80)				
Anastasia	Not In; House							Dan; Orna	Dan; Orna	Evicted (Day 73)					
Shem	Ester; Orna	No; Nominations	Orna; Shani	Shani; Dan	Orna; Avihai	No; Nominations	No; Nominations	Dan; Orna	Evicted (Day 66)						
Talin	Ester; Indal	Nominated	Hezi; Shani	S. & K. Haim	Shem; Haim	No; Nominations	No; Nominations	Evicted (Day 52)							
Shmulik & Kokhav	Ester; Orna	No; Nominations	Orna; Shani	Shani; Talin	Evicted (Day 31)	Nominated	Re-evicted (Day 45)								
Hezi	Orna; Dan	No; Nominations	Orna; Dan	Evicted (Day 24)		Nominated	Re-evicted (Day 45)								
Tehila	Orna; Maayan	Nominated	Evicted (Day 17)			Nominated	Re-evicted (Day 45)								
Ester	Shem; Avihai	Evicted (Day 10)													
Notes	1	2, 3	4	5	6	none		7, 8	9	10	11	none			
Nominated (pre-save and replace)	Orna; Shem; Ester; Maayan	Indal; Dan; Maayan; Orna; Shani; Tehila; Talin	Hezi; Orna; Shani; Shem	Eden; Shani; S. & K. Talin	Avihai; Orna; Shani; Shem	none		Dan; Orna; Shani; Shem	Anastasia; Orna; Shani; Sharon	Indal; Avihai; Dan; Eden; Haim; Jodi; Maayan; Omer; Orna; Shani; Sharon	Jodi; Omer; Orna; Shani; Sharon	none			
Saved	Maayan	Maayan	Orna	Eden	Shani	none		Shani	Shani	Omer	Omer	none			
Against public vote	Orna; Shem; Ester; Tehila	Indal; Dan; Eden; Orna; Shani; Tehila; Talin	Hezi; Shani; Shem; S. & K.	Maayan; Shani; S. & K. Talin	Avihai; Haim; Orna; Shem	Hezi; Orna; S. & K. Tehila	Indal; Avihai; Dan; Eden; Haim; Maayan; Orna; Shani; Shem; Talin	Avihai; Dan; Orna; Shem	Anastasia; Avihai; Orna; Sharon	Indal; Avihai; Dan; Eden; Haim; Jodi; Maayan; Orna; Shani; Sharon	Haim; Jodi; Orna; Shani; Sharon	Dan; Omer; Orna; Shani; Sharon	Avihai; Haim; Maayan; Orna; Shani; Sharon	Avihai; Haim; Maayan; Shani; Sharon	
Evicted	Ester; Fewest votes to save	Tehila; Fewest votes to save	Hezi; Fewest votes to save	Shmulik & Kokhav; Fewest votes to save	Orna; Fewest votes to save	Hezi; Fewest votes to save	Talin; Fewest votes to save	Shem; Fewest votes to save	Anastasia; Fewest votes to save	Eden; Fewest votes to save	Jodi; Fewest votes to save	Dan; Fewest votes to save	Orna; Fewest votes to save	Maayan; Fewest votes to win	Sharon; Fewest votes to win
Evicted	Ester; Fewest votes to save	Tehila; Fewest votes to save	Hezi; Fewest votes to save	Shmulik & Kokhav; Fewest votes to save	Orna; Fewest votes to save	Shmulik & Kokhav; Fewest votes to save	Talin; Fewest votes to save	Shem; Fewest votes to save	Anastasia; Fewest votes to save	Eden; Fewest votes to save	Jodi; Fewest votes to save	Dan; Fewest votes to save	Orna; Fewest votes to save	Haim; Fewest votes to win	Shani; Fewest votes to win
Evicted	Ester; Fewest votes to save	Tehila; Fewest votes to save	Hezi; Fewest votes to save	Shmulik & Kokhav; Fewest votes to save	Orna; Fewest votes to save	Shmulik & Kokhav; Fewest votes to save	Talin; Fewest votes to save	Shem; Fewest votes to save	Anastasia; Fewest votes to save	Indal; Fewest votes to save	Jodi; Fewest votes to save	Omer; Fewest votes to save	Orna; Fewest votes to save	Haim; Fewest votes to win	Shani; Fewest votes to win
Evicted	Ester; Fewest votes to save	Tehila; Fewest votes to save	Hezi; Fewest votes to save	Shmulik & Kokhav; Fewest votes to save	Orna; Fewest votes to save	Tehila; Fewest votes to save	Talin; Fewest votes to save	Shem; Fewest votes to save	Anastasia; Fewest votes to save	Indal; Fewest votes to save	Jodi; Fewest votes to save	Omer; Fewest votes to save	Orna; Fewest votes to save	Avihai; Most votes to win	

=== Notes ===
- ^1 Maayan won the Big Brother Games, she is no longer nominated. She nominated Tehila for eviction.
- ^2 As Head of House, Hezi was immune. He nominated 'poor group' housemates for eviction.
- ^3 Maayan won the Big Brother Games, she is no longer nominated. She nominated Eden for eviction.
- ^4 Orna won the Big Brother Games, she is no longer nominated. She nominated Shmulik & Kokhav for eviction.
- ^5 Eden won the Big Brother Games, she is no longer nominated. She nominated Maayan for eviction.
- ^6 Shani won the Big Brother Games, she is no longer nominated. She nominated Haim for eviction.
- ^7 On Day 59, Anastasia, Jodi, Omer, Sharon entered the house. As new housemates, they cannot be nominated.
- ^8 Shani won the Big Brother Games, she is no longer nominated. She nominated Avihai for eviction.
- ^9 Shani won the Big Brother Games, she is no longer nominated. She nominated Avihai for eviction.
- ^10 Omer won the Big Brother Games, he is no longer nominated.
- ^11 Omer won the Big Brother Games, he is no longer nominated. He nominated Haim for eviction.

== Nominations totals received ==
	Week 1	Week 2	Week 3	Week 4	Week 5	Week 6	Week 7	Week 9	Week 10	Week 11	Week 12	Week 13	Final	Total
Avihai	1	–	0	1	3	–	–	4	2	–	1	0	Winner	12
Shani	1	–	6	6	3	–	–	5	6	–	6	4	Runner-Up	37
Haim	–	–	1	1	1	–	–	0	0	–	0	0	3rd Place	3
Sharon	Not in House							-	3	–	2	5	4th Place	10
Maayan	3	–	–	0	1	–	–	0	0	–	1	0	5th Place	5
Orna	7	–	4	0	3	–	–	5	4	–	2	1	Evicted	26
Dan	2	–	1	2	1	–	–	5	1	–	0	1	Evicted	13
Omer	Not in House							-	1	–	3	5	Evicted	9
Jodi	Not in House							-	2	–	3	Evicted		5
Indal	2	–	0	0	0	–	–	0	1	–	Evicted			3
Eden	0	–	1	3	2	–	–	1	1	–	Evicted			8
Anastasia	Not in House							-	3	Evicted				3
Shem	5	–	3	0	5	–	–	6	Evicted					19
Talin	1	–	1	4	0	–	–	Evicted						6
Shmulik & Kokhav	–	–	2	5	Evicted	–	Re-Evicted							7
Hezi	0	–	5	Evicted		–	Re-Evicted							5
Tehila	2	–	Evicted			–	Re-Evicted							2
Ester	4	Evicted												4
