= Big Brother (Israeli TV series) season 4 =

Big Brother
- Season 4
- Presented by: Erez Tal; Assi Azar
- No. of days: 93
- No. of housemates: 21
- Winner: Yekutiel "Kuti" Sabag
- Runner-up: Tamir Verdi
- No. of episodes: 28

Release
- Original network: Channel 2 (Keshet)
- Original release: 1 January – 2 April 2012

Season chronology
- ← Previous; Season 3 Next → Season 5

HaAh HaGadol 4 (Hebrew: האח הגדול 4; lit. The Big Brother 4) is the fourth season of the Israeli version of the reality show Big Brother.

The season began broadcasting on 1 January 2012 and ended on 2 April 2012. Seventeen housemates entered the house at the premiere, and another housemate joined after 22 days. Another three housemates joined after 45 days. the premiere episode scored an unprecedented 45% on the ratings chart.

The season showcases, among other personalities, a contestant with an intense hatred for Arabs, a pro-Palestinian sympathizer, a newlywed couple, and a blind man with his guide dog.

== Themes ==
Religion, politics and ethnicity have been among the themes to generate tension between contestants in the Big Brother house during the fourth season.

Yekutiel "Kuti" Sebbag refused to eat food cooked by Avivit Bar-Zohar one Sabbath eve, leading Eran Tartakovsky to call Sebbag a whiny hypocrite but also leading Bar-Zohar to go on a fast on account of preventing a Jew from eating on the Sabbath.

Controversial remarks made by Saar Szekely in reference to Israeli policy in the West Bank drew criticism from the Israeli settlement of Ariel, which issued a statement regretting that Big Brother had offered Szekely a platform for his views. Various Facebook groups called Szekely a traitor and demanded his removal from the show.

== Housemates ==
Name	Age	Occupation	Residence	Day entered	Day exited	Status
Yekutiel "Kuti" Sabag	29	Cook	Beit Shemesh	1	93	Winner
Tamir Verdi	36	Advertiser	Tel Aviv	1	93	Runner-up
Saar Szekely	27	Artist and programmer	Tel Aviv	1	93	Third Place
Sari "Panoona" Shimhov	23	Dancer	Tel Aviv	1	93	Fourth Place
Yana Yoseph	23	Clothing store manager	Tel Aviv	1	93	Fifth Place
Avivit Bar-Zohar	29	Unemployed	Rehovot	1	87	Evicted
Eran Tartakovsky	30	Student	Beersheba	1	80	Evicted
Sophie Kravetsky	26	Waitress	Tel Aviv (Originally from Russia)	1	80	Evicted
Tzvi Portal	34	Cell phone importer	Tel Aviv	45	73	Evicted
Eitam Israeli	27	Web developer	Tel Aviv	1	66	Evicted
Einav Weiner	28	Sales manager	Geulim	45	66	Evicted
Liron Zehavi	32	Former model	Holon	45	59	Evicted
Yael Baron	47	Couples therapist	Tel Aviv	1	57	Evicted
Shay Regev	34	Businessman	Tel Aviv	1	45	Evicted
Yossi Srour	54	Hair Stylist and Professional makeup artist	Kiryat Ata	1	38	Evicted
Kim Ratush	32	Lawyer	Kiryat Haim	1	31	Evicted
Aviv Zilber	25	Diamond dealer	Netanya	22	24	Walked
Dudu Kapara	34	Truck driver	Rehovot	1	19	Walked
Bari Simon Zohar	52	Dancer	Zikhron Ya'akov	1	17	Walked
Ziva Cohen	34	Housewife	Long Island, New York, United States	1	17	Evicted
Betty Kapara	29	Airport border control	Rehovot	1	10	Evicted

== Housemate exchange ==
From February 27 to March 5, 2012, 18-year-old Model Victoria Irouleguy from Gran Hermano Argentina 7 where she spent 7 days in the Israel house as part of the Israel Week. On the same week (February 27 to March 5), the Israel housemate Sophie Karwacki spent 7 days in the Argentina house.

== Nominations table ==
	Week 1	Week 2	Week 3	Week 4	Week 5	Week 6	Week 7	Week 8		Week 9	Week 10	Week 11	Week 12	Week 13 Final		Nominations received
Kuti	Sophie, Eran	Eran, Ziva	Eran, Shay	No nominations	Eran, Shay	Eran, Shay	Eran, Saar	No nominations	Liron, Eran	No nominations	Eran, Sari	Eran, Sari	Saar, Sari	Winner (Day 93)		13
Tamir	Sari, Kim	Sari, Yossi	Sari, Kim	No nominations	Tamir	Yana, Sari	Sari, Yana	No nominations	Sari, Yana	No nominations	Sari, Yana	Yana, Sari	Yana, Sari	Runner-Up (Day 93)		2
Saar	Barry, Sophie	Barry, Kuti	Shay, Sophie	No nominations	Saar	Shay, Avivit	Avivit, Kuti	No nominations	Liron, Tzvi	No nominations	Tzvi, Kuti	Avivit, Kuti	Avivit, Kuti	Third Place (Day 93)		11
Sari	Ziva, Barry	Ziva, Barry	Sophie, Avivit	No nominations	Avivit, Sophie	Avivit, Shay	Avivit, Yael	No nominations	Liron, Tzvi	No nominations	Tzvi, Kuti	Kuti, Avivit	Kuti, Avivit	Fourth Place (Day 93)		10
Yana	Barry, Ziva	Ziva, Barry	Kim, Avivit	No nominations	Yana	Shay, Avivit	Avivit, Eran	No nominations	Liron, Avivit	No nominations	Avivit, Tzvi	Avivit, Tamir	Avivit, Tamir	Fifth Place (Day 93)		11
Avivit	Ziva, Sari	Ziva, Barry	Yana, Saar	No nominations	Saar, Yana	Yana, Sophie	Saar, Eitam	No nominations	Yana, Sofi	No nominations	Yana, Sari	Yana, Shophi	Yana, Sari	Evicted (Day 87)		17
Eran	Kuti, Sophie	Kuti, Sophie	Kuti, Shay	No nominations	Shay, Sophie	Kuti, Sophie	Yana, Kuti	No nominations	Tzvi, Kuti	No nominations	Kuti, Tzvi	Kuti, Yana	Evicted (Day 80)			16
Sophie	Sari, Shay	Dudu, Kuti	Kuti, Eran	No nominations	Saar, Eran	Shay, Avivit	Avivit, Yael	No nominations	Tzvi, Einav	Exempt	Avivit, Tzvi	Avivit, Saar	Evicted (Day 80)			23
Tzvi	Not in House						Sophie, Saar	No nominations	Liron, Sophie	No nominations	Sophie, Eran	Evicted (Day 73)				6
Eitam	Eran, Shay	Eran, Saar	Kim, Sophie	No nominations	Tamir, Avivit	Avivit, Eran	Avivit, Yael	No nominations	Avivit, Tzvi	No nominations	Evicted (Day 66)					2
Einav	Not in House						Saar, Yael	No nominations	Liron, Sophie	No nominations	Evicted (Day 66)					2
Liron	Not in House						Yael, Yana	No nominations	Tzvi, Einav	Evicted (Day 59)						6
Yael	Failed; Task	Barry, Ziva	Shay, Kim	No nominations	Sophie, Shay	Sophie, Shay	Sophie, Eitam	No nominations	Evicted (Day 57)							6
Shay	Kim, Sophie	Kuti, Kim	Kim, Eran	No nominations	Eran, Saar	Eran, Sophie	Evicted (Day 45)									23
Yossi	Failed; Task	Ziva, Barry	Shay, Saar	No nominations	Shay, Sophie	Evicted (Day 38)										1
Kim	Ziva, Shay	Ziva, Shay	Shay, Sari	No nominations	Evicted (Day 31)											9
Aviv	Not in House			Walked (Day 24)												N/A
Dudu	Shay, Ziva	Shay, Avivit	Walked (Day 19)													2
Barry	Yael, Sophie	Kuti, Dudu	Walked (Day 17)													9
Ziva	Sophie, Kim	Kuti, Yana	Evicted (Day 17)													13
Betty	Ziva, Shay	Evicted (Day 10)														0
Nominated for eviction	All; Housemates	Barry, Kuti, Ziva	Eran, Kim, Shay, Sophie		Kuti, Saar, Sari, Tamir, Yael, Yana, Yossi	Avivit, Shay, Sophie	Avivit, Saar, Yael	Avivit, Yael	Liron, Sophie, Tzvi	Avivit, Einav, Eitam, Eran, Kuti, Saar, Sari, Tamir, Tzvi, Yana	Kuti, Sari, Tzvi	All; Housemates	Avivit, Kuti, Sari, Yana	Kuti, Saari, Sari, Tamir, Yana		
Walked	none	Barry; Dudu	Aviv	none												
Evicted	Betty	Ziva	Eviction canceled	Kim	Yossi	Shay	Eviction canceled	Yael	Liron	Einav	Tzvi	Sophie	Avivit	Yana; Fewest votes to win	Sari; Fewest votes to win	
Evicted	Betty	Ziva	Eviction canceled	Kim	Yossi	Shay	Eviction canceled	Yael	Liron	Einav	Tzvi	Sophie	Avivit	Saar; Fewest votes to win	Tamir; Fewest votes to win	
Evicted	Betty	Ziva	Eviction canceled	Kim	Yossi	Shay	Eviction canceled	Yael	Liron	Eitam	Tzvi	Eran	Avivit	Saar; Fewest votes to win	Tamir; Fewest votes to win	
Evicted	Betty	Ziva	Eviction canceled	Kim	Yossi	Shay	Eviction canceled	Yael	Liron	Eitam	Tzvi	Eran	Avivit	Kuti; Most votes to win		
