= Big Brother (Israeli TV series) season 3 =

Big Brother
- Season 3
- Presented by: Erez Tal; Assi Azar
- No. of days: 109
- No. of housemates: 22
- Winner: Yaakov "Jackie" Menahem
- Runner-up: Lihi Griner
- No. of episodes: 32

Release
- Original network: Channel 2 (Keshet)
- Original release: 8 December 2010 – 26 March 2011

Season chronology
- ← Previous; Season 2 Next → Season 4

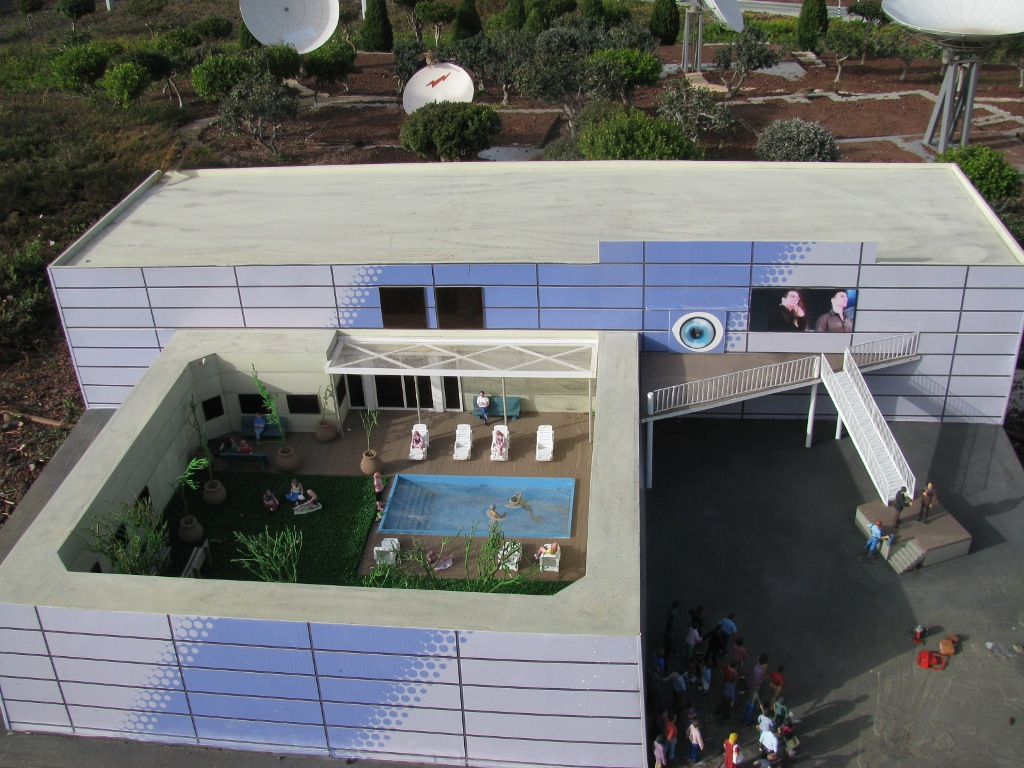
HaAh HaGadol house in Mini Israel

HaAh HaGadol 3 (Hebrew: האח הגדול 3, lit. The Big Brother 3) is the third series of the Israeli version of the reality show Big Brother. The show was first broadcast on 8 December 2010 and ended on 26 March 2011. Differently from the previous seasons, seventeen housemates entered the house at the premiere, instead of sixteen in the previous seasons and another five joining after 50 days. The housemates are competing for a one million shekel prize. The house is located in Neve Ilan, a suburb of Jerusalem.

== Housemates ==
Name	Day entered	Day exited	Status
Jackie	1	109	Winner
Lihi	1	109	Runner-up
Nofar	1	109	Third Place
Amir	1	109	Fourth Place
Sivan A.	1	109	Fifth Place
Frida	1	102	Evicted
Li Oz	1	99	Evicted
Elad	1	95	Evicted
Hila	50	88	Evicted
Tomer	50	88	Evicted
Merav	50	81	Evicted
Ram	50	74	Evicted
Dana	1	67	Evicted
Atay	1	60	Evicted
Yoav	1	60	Evicted
Aviram	50	53	Evicted
Liam	1	46	Evicted
Rinat	1	39	Evicted
Shiran	1	39	Evicted
Igal	1	32	Evicted
Yoram	1	22	Evicted
Sivan D.	1	11	Evicted

=== Amir ===
Amir Goldberg, 28, Metula/Tel Aviv.

=== Aviram ===
Aviram Ben Shoshan, 30, Los Angeles/Eilat. He was engaged to the housemate Lihi Griner.

=== Atay ===
Atay Schulberg, 27, Jerusalem.

=== Dana ===
Dana Ron, 38, Tel Aviv. Dana entered the house on day 1 and was the tenth evicted on day 67.

=== Elad ===
Elad Zafani, 21, Tel Aviv.

=== Frida ===
Frida Hecht, 46, Tel Aviv.

=== Hila ===
Hila Akray, 25, Jerusalem. Hila entered the house on day 50 and was the fourteenth evicted on day 88 with Tomer.

=== Igal ===
Igal Alenkri, 50, Ramat Gan. Igal entered the house on day 1 and was the third evicted on day 32.

=== Jackie ===
Yaakov "Jackie" Menahem, 22, Ramat Gan. The winner of the third series.

=== Liam ===
Liam Raz, 27, Haifa.

=== Lihi ===
Lihi Griner, 26, Los Angeles/Kiryat Ono. She was engaged to the housemate Aviram Ben Shoshan.

=== Li Oz ===
Li Oz Cohen, 25, Tel Aviv.

=== Merav ===
Merav Batito, 41, Ra'anana.

=== Nofar ===
Nofar Mor, 22, Tel Aviv.

=== Ram ===
Ram Preiss Sitton, 26, Netanya Chairman of the Green party in Netanya- Wanted to bring the German language and the protection of the Environment into Prime time.

=== Rinat ===
Rinat Gitter, 21, Petah Tikva. She is the twin sister of the housemate Shiran Gitter.

=== Shiran ===
Shiran Gitter, 21, Petah Tikva. She is the twin sister of the housemate Rinat Gitter.

=== Sivan A. ===
Sivan Avrahami, 26, Or Yehuda.

=== Sivan D. ===
Sivan Dror, 28, Haifa.

=== Tomer ===
Tomer Zrihan, 34, Pardes Hanna-Karkur. Tomer entered the house on day 50 and was the thirteenth evicted on day 88 with Hila.

=== Yoav ===
Yoav Maor, 21, Kfar Saba.

=== Yoram ===
Yoram Cohen, 49, Ofra. Yoram entered the house on day 1 and was the second evicted on day 22.

== Nominations table ==
	Week 1	Week 2	Week 3	Week 4	Week 5	Week 6	Week 7	Week 8	Week 9	Week 10	Week 11	Week 12	Week 13	Week 14	Week 15	Final Week 16	
Jackie	Completed; Task	Igal, Liam	No; Nominations	Igal, Liam	No; Nominations	Liam, Amir	Aviram	No; Nominations	Amir, Tomer	Tomer, Hila	Tomer, Hila	Tomer, Hila	Lihi, Frida	No; Nominations	Frida, Lihi	Winner (Day 109)	
Lihi	Completed; Task	Liam, Yoram	No; Nominations	Igal, Dana	No; Nominations	Liam, Dana	Aviram	No; Nominations	Dana, Nofar	Jackie, Nofar	Nofar, Merav	Jackie, Nofar	Nofar, Jackie	No; Nominations	Nofar, Jackie	Runner-Up (Day 109)	
Nofar	No; Nominations	Yoram, Liam	No; Nominations	Dana, Liam	No; Nominations	Dana, Liam	Aviram	No; Nominations	Hila, Frida	Frida, Hila	Hila, Lihi	Hila, Lihi	Frida, Lihi	No; Nominations	Frida, Lihi	Third Place (Day 109)	
Amir	No; Nominations	Shiran, Igal	No; Nominations	Lihi, Frida	No; Nominations	Atay, Frida	Aviram	No; Nominations	Frida, Ram	Ram, Frida	Li Oz, Frida	Elad, Lihi	Li Oz, Lihi	No; Nominations	Frida, Lihi	Fourth Place (Day 109)	
Sivan A.	No; Nominations	Igal, Shiran	No; Nominations	Lihi, Frida	No; Nominations	Lihi, Frida	Aviram	No; Nominations	Tomer, Frida	Hila, Merav	Hila, Tomer	Hila, Tomer	Elad, Frida	No; Nominations	Frida, Jackie	Fifth Place (Day 109)	
Frida	No; Nominations	Yoram, Liam	No; Nominations	Igal, Amir	No; Nominations	Amir, Dana	Aviram	No; Nominations	Dana, Nofar	Nofar, Amir	Nofar, Merav	Nofar, Tomer	Nofar, Jackie	No; Nominations	Amir, Sivan A.	Evicted (Day 102)	
Li Oz	No; Nominations	Nofar, Rinat	No; Nominations	Dana, Igal	No; Nominations	Liam, Amir	Aviram	No; Nominations	Amir, Dana	Amir, Ram	Amir, Hila	Jackie, Hila	Jackie, Sivan A.	No; Nominations	Evicted (Day 99)		
Elad	Completed; Task	Igal, Dana	No; Nominations	Yoav, Dana	No; Nominations	Liam, Dana	Aviram	No; Nominations	Dana, Frida	Hila, Sivan A.	Hila, Sivan A.	Frida, Amir	Frida, Sivan A.	Evicted (Day 95)			
Hila	Not in House						In Private; Section	Li Oz, Frida	Tomer, Nofar	Nofar, Tomer	Nofar, Merav	Jackie, Sivan A.	Evicted (Day 88)				
Tomer	Not in House						In Private; Section	Li Oz, Jackie	Frida, Hila	Ram, Hila	Amir, Hila	Nofar, Sivan A.	Evicted (Day 88)				
Merav	Not in House						In Private; Section	Li Oz, Yoav	Nofar, Sivan A.	Hila, Sivan A.	Hila, Frida	Evicted (Day 81)					
Ram	Not in House						In Private; Section	Sivan A., Yoav	Amir, Tomer	Amir, Tomer	Evicted (Day 74)						
Dana	No; Nominations	Elad, Li Oz	No; Nominations	Lihi, Frida	No; Nominations	Lihi, Frida	Aviram	No; Nominations	Lihi, Frida	Evicted (Day 67)							
Atay	No; Nominations	Dana, Igal	No; Nominations	Igal, Amir	No; Nominations	Dana, Liam	Aviram	No; Nominations	Evicted (Day 60)								
Yoav	No; Nominations	Yoram, Amir	No; Nominations	Lihi, Atay	No; Nominations	Lihi, Frida	Aviram	No; Nominations	Evicted (Day 60)								
Aviram	Not in House						In Private; Section	Evicted (Day 53)									
Liam	No; Nominations	Igal, Nofar	No; Nominations	Frida, Lihi	No; Nominations	Nofar, Lihi	Evicted (Day 46)										
Rinat	Completed; Task	Li Oz, Amir	No; Nominations	Li Oz, Frida	No; Nominations	Evicted (Day 39)											
Shiran	Completed; Task	Amir, Liam	No; Nominations	Frida, Li Oz	No; Nominations	Evicted (Day 39)											
Igal	Completed; Task	Amir, Sivan A.	No; Nominations	Liam, Frida	Evicted (Day 32)												
Yoram	No; Nominations	Igal, Shiran	No; Nominations	Evicted (Day 22)													
Sivan D.	No; Nominations	Evicted (Day 11)															
Notes	^{1}	none	^{2}	none	^{3}	none	^{4}	^{5}	none			^{6}	^{7}	none		^{8}	
Nominated for eviction	Amir, Atay, Dana, Frida, Igal, Liam, Li Oz, Nofar, Sivan A., Sivan D., Yoav, Yoram	Amir, Igal, Liam, Yoram		Frida, Igal, Lihi	Amir, Atay, Dana, Elad, Frida, Jackie, Li Oz, Liam, Lihi, Nofar, Rinat, Shiran, Sivan A., Yoav	Dana, Frida, Liam, Lihi	Aviram, Hila, Merav, Ram, Tomer	Amir, Atay, Dana, Elad, Frida, Jackie, Lihi, Nofar, Sivan A., Yoav,	Dana, Frida, Nofar, Tomer	Amir, Hila, Nofar, Ram, Tomer	Hila, Merav, Nofar	Amir, Frida, Hila, Jackie, Nofar, Tomer	Elad, Frida, Jackie, Li Oz, Lihi, Nofar, Sivan A.	Amir, Frida, Jackie, Li Oz, Lihi, Nofar, Sivan A.	Frida, Jackie, Lihi	Amir, Jackie, Lihi, Nofar, Sivan A.	
Evicted	Sivan D. Fewest votes to save	Eviction canceled	Yoram; Fewest votes to save	Igal; Fewest votes to save	Shiran; Fewest votes to save	Liam; Fewest votes to save	Aviram; Fewest votes to save	Yoav; Fewest votes to save	Dana; Fewest votes to save	Ram; Fewest votes to save	Merav; Fewest votes to save	Tomer; Fewest votes to save	Elad; Fewest votes to save	Li Oz; Fewest votes to save	Frida; Fewest votes to save	Sivan A. Fewest votes to win	Amir; Fewest votes to win
Evicted	Sivan D. Fewest votes to save	Eviction canceled	Yoram; Fewest votes to save	Igal; Fewest votes to save	Rinat; Fewest votes to save	Liam; Fewest votes to save	Aviram; Fewest votes to save	Atay; Fewest votes to save	Dana; Fewest votes to save	Ram; Fewest votes to save	Merav; Fewest votes to save	Hila; Fewest votes to save	Elad; Fewest votes to save	Li Oz; Fewest votes to save	Frida; Fewest votes to save	Nofar; Fewest votes to win	Lihi; Fewest votes to win
Evicted	Sivan D. Fewest votes to save	Eviction canceled	Yoram; Fewest votes to save	Igal; Fewest votes to save	Rinat; Fewest votes to save	Liam; Fewest votes to save	Aviram; Fewest votes to save	Atay; Fewest votes to save	Dana; Fewest votes to save	Ram; Fewest votes to save	Merav; Fewest votes to save	Hila; Fewest votes to save	Elad; Fewest votes to save	Li Oz; Fewest votes to save	Frida; Fewest votes to save	Jackie; Most votes to win	

=== Notes ===
- ^1 Shiran, Rinat, Jackie, Igal and Lihi were immune from eviction after winning a secret mission (Hide the fact that Rinat has a twin sister). Later, Elad won a personal mission and was immune instead of Igal.
- ^2 Jackie was swapped with Lydia Navarro from Gran Hermano 12 for one week.
- ^3 For the first time in this season, two housemates were evicted from the Big Brother house.
- ^4 Aviram, Hila, Merav, Ram and Tomer were new housemates and they entered into a private section for their first four days. The old housemates had to choose one of the new housemates who they don't want to be entered into the house. After the vote, Aviram was evicted, and Hila, Merav, Ram and Tomer entered the house.
- ^5 Hila, Merav, Ram and Tomer were immune from being nominated because they are new housemates. They had to choose two housemates who they wanted to stay in the house instead of who they wanted to evict.
- ^6 As a part of the weekly budget mission of the housemates, Elad had to nominate two housemates publicly. The two housemates (Who are Frida and Amir) are automatically nominated for eviction in addition to the other nominations.
- ^7 In week 13, any housemate who got at least one vote, was nominated for eviction.
- ^8 There were no nominations in the final week and the public was voting for housemates to win, rather than be evicted. the housemate with the most SMS votes was the winner.
