= Tahounia Rubel =

Tahounia Rubel טהוניה רובל
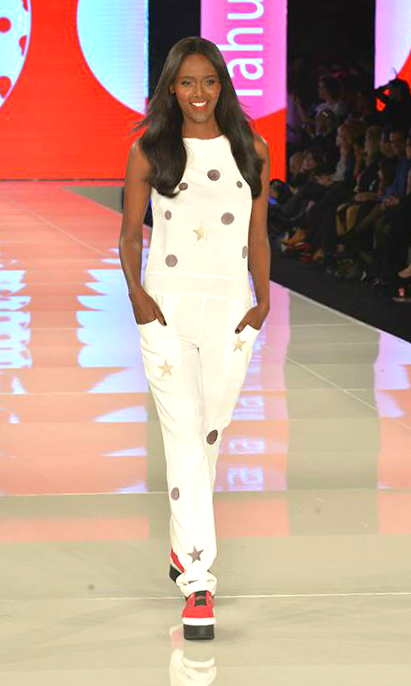
- Born: February 20, 1988 (age 38); Gondar, Ethiopia
- Occupations: Model; singer; television personality; presenter
- Modeling information
- Height: 1.75 m (5 ft 9 in)
- Hair color: Black
- Eye color: Brown
- Agency: MC2 Model Management (Tel Aviv); Vision Models (Cape Town)

Tahounia Rubel (Hebrew: טהוניה רובל, often written as Tahuonia or Tahunia; born February 20, 1988) is an Israeli fashion model, singer, and television personality. She became widely known as the first person of Ethiopian origin to win HaAh HaGadol (the Israeli version of Big Brother), in the fifth season.

== Biography ==
Tahounia Rubel was born in Gondar, Ethiopia, to an Ethiopian-Jewish family. Her name "Tahounia" derives from the word meaning "staying for a prolonged term" in Amharic. Rubel moved to Israel with her family when she was three, under the widely known immigration drive called Operation Solomon. She served as a Driving Course Instructor in the Logistics Corps of the Israel Defense Forces. During her military service, she completed 12 years of schooling.

In 2012, Rubel went to London, where she lived for eight months in a models apartment. She has since led campaigns for familiar designer brands in London, including Sleek Makeup, MAC Cosmetics and Diesel for Glamour magazine. She has also been likened to a young Iman.

In 2012, Rubel was named "The Israeli Supermodel" in an Israeli beauty pageant, becoming the first woman of Ethiopian origin to win a local beauty pageant. She subsequently represented Israel at the World Supermodel Pageant in Fiji, but missed a place in the final.

In 2013, Rubel won the fifth series of HaAh HaGadol (the Israeli version of Big Brother) and worth NIS one million. Roni Maili, one of the houseguests in the show who was eliminated later because of aggressive behavior, made racist comments about her.

In September 2013, Rubel participated in a special fundraiser broadcast of Latet on Channel 2 and she was chosen to voice-over an animated character in a TV commercial for Klik of Unilever company. In October 2013, Rubel was invited with her family to the president's residence, where President Shimon Peres held a salute ceremony honoring Ethiopian Jews in celebration of Sigd. The same month, she performed Eyal Golan's song Kol HaHalomot (Hebrew: כל החלומות, "All The Dreams") on the Israeli reality TV program HaKokhav HaBa (the Israeli version of Rising Star).

A 45-minute documentary film about Rubel, Tahounia - By Herself, was produced by Galit Gutman. It reveals Rubel's most intimate moments in the span of eight months and tells about her tough childhood, until entering the HaAh HaGadol (the Israeli version of Big Brother). The documentary was broadcast on May 15, 2014 on Channel 2 to 611.3 thousand viewers and it was the second highest rating for that day. A few days later it was broadcast in Europe and the United States on the Israeli Network.

In 2021, she took part in the second season of the Israeli production of The Masked Singer as the Babushka and was the eighth contestant eliminated.

== See also ==
- Israeli fashion
- Ethiopian Jews in Israel
- Yityish Titi Aynaw
