= Big Brother (Israeli TV series) =

Television series

- Also known as: Big Brother Israel
- Hebrew: האח הגדול; HaAh HaGadol
- Presented by: Current; Liron Weizman (2018–); Guy Zu-Aretz (2019–); Former: Erez Tal (2008–2017); Assi Azar (2008–2014); Korin Gideon (2015–2017); Ofer Shechter (2018); Asi Israelof (2018)
- No. of seasons: 15 (Regular); 4 (VIP)
- No. of episodes: 475

Production
- Producer: Elad Koperman
- Production location: Neve Ilan
- Running time: 90 minutes (approx.)
- Production companies: Koperman Productions; Endemol Shine Israel

Original release
- Network: Keshet
- Release: 1 September 2008 – 28 March 2017
- Network: Reshet
- Release: 5 May 2018 – present

Big Brother (Hebrew: האח הגדול, Transliteration: HaAh HaGadol, lit. 'The Big Brother') is the Israeli version of the international reality television franchise Big Brother created by producer John de Mol Jr. in 1997. The show began broadcasting in 2008, following the premise of other versions of the format, the show features a group of contestants, known as "Housemates," who live together in a specially constructed house that is isolated from the outside world. The housemates are continuously monitored during their stay in the house by live television cameras as well as personal audio microphones. Throughout the competition, housemates are evicted from the house. The last remaining Housemate wins the competition and is awarded a cash prize.

== History ==
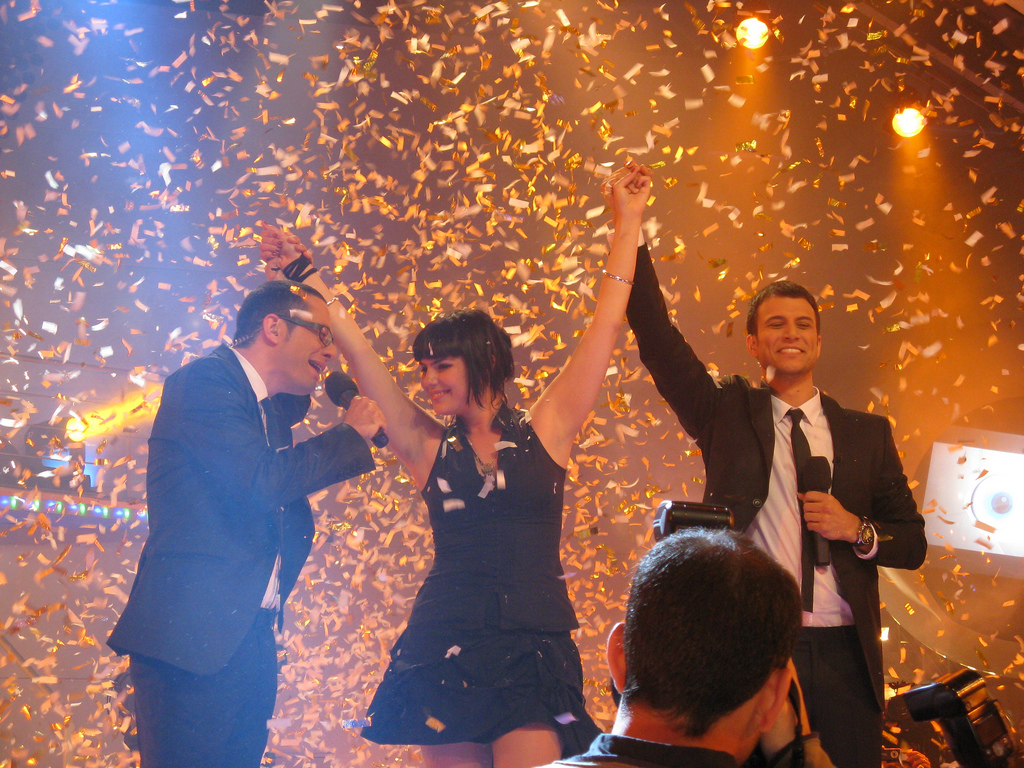
Erez Tal (left) & Assi Azar (right), hosting Big Brother (2008)

The show was initially produced by Keshet and aired on Channel 2 from 2008 to 2017. The show ran for eight original seasons and two celebrity seasons.

During its run on Channel 2, the show was hosted by Erez Tal and Assi Azar from season 1 to season 6. After Assi Azar left the show, Erez Tal and Korin Gideon hosted the show from season 7 to season 8.

At the end of season 7, it was declared that due to ownership changes in the television production companies, at the end of season 8, the broadcast rights of the show would be owned by "Reshet".

After Channel 2 got closed and split into two new channels at the end of October 2017, it was announced that the show would be produced by Reshet and aired on Channel 13 from 2018. As of June 2023, thirteen seasons and four celebrity ("VIP") seasons have been broadcast.

Liron Weizman hosted the show from season 9 alongside Ofer Shechter and Asi Israelof. In November 2018, it was announced that Guy Zu-Aretz will replace Shechter and Israelof and will host the show alongside Liron Weizman since the third celebrity season in 2019.

On 10 August 2025, members of Standing Together disrupted the live filming of an episode of Big Brother to demand an end to the ongoing war on Gaza.

== Format ==
Big Brother is a reality game show and is based on the international Big Brother series produced by Endemol in the Netherlands which began in 1999. The show's name comes from George Orwell's novel Nineteen Eighty-Four (1984), which revolves around a dystopia in which dictator Big Brother is the all-seeing leader. A group of people (called the Housemates) live together in a house, where 24 hours a day their every word and every action is recorded by cameras and microphones in all the rooms in the house. Access to television, the Internet, print media, and time is prohibited. In addition, the housemates live in complete confinement; they have no access to the outside world. At least once a week, the housemates nominate two housemates they wish to face a public vote to evict. The two or more housemates with the most votes face the public vote. The viewing public decides which of them gets evicted through text message votes or phone calls.

Should their stay inside the house become difficult for them to bear, a housemate is allowed to voluntarily leave at any time during the game. In the event of a withdrawal from the house, a replacement housemate usually enters in their place.

In the final week of each season, the viewers vote for which of the remaining people in the house should win the prize money and be crowned the winner of Big Brother.

== Series details ==
Series	Season	Day	Housemates	Winner	Runner-up	Presenter(s)	Prize	Episodes	Originally released		
Series	Season	Day	Housemates	Winner	Runner-up	Presenter(s)	Prize	Episodes	First released	Last released	Network
האח הגדול Big Brother	1	107	20	Shifra Cornfield	Yossi Boublil	Erez Tal; Assi Azar	₪1,000,000	32	1 September 2008	16 December 2008	Channel 2 Keshet
האח הגדול Big Brother	2	110	21	Eliraz Sadeh	Sa'ar Scheinfein	Erez Tal; Assi Azar	₪1,000,000	33	15 November 2009	4 March 2010	Channel 2 Keshet
האח הגדול Big Brother	3	109	22	Yaakov "Jackie" Menahem	Lihi Griner	Erez Tal; Assi Azar	₪1,000,000	32	8 December 2010	26 March 2011	Channel 2 Keshet
האח הגדול Big Brother	4	93	21	Yekutiel "Kuti" Sabag	Tamir Verdi	Erez Tal; Assi Azar	₪1,000,000	28	1 January 2012	2 April 2012	Channel 2 Keshet
האח הגדול Big Brother	5	115	23	Tahounia Rubel	Levana "Zoharim" Gogman	Erez Tal; Assi Azar	₪1,000,000	34	5 May 2013	27 August 2013	Channel 2 Keshet
האח הגדול Big Brother	6	109	19	Tal Gilboa	Eldad Gal-Ed	Erez Tal; Assi Azar	₪1,000,000	32	14 May 2014	30 August 2014	Channel 2 Keshet
האח הגדול Big Brother	7	113	22	Shai Mika Yifrah	Barak Edri	Erez Tal; Korin Gideon	An apartment worth ₪1,400,000	33	16 December 2015	6 April 2016	Channel 2 Keshet
האח הגדול Big Brother	8	101	19	Avihai Ohana	Shani Goldshtein	Erez Tal; Korin Gideon	An apartment worth ₪1,400,000	30	18 December 2016	28 March 2017	Channel 2 Keshet
האח הגדול Big Brother	9	120	27	Israel Ogalbo	Eliav Rachamin	Liron Weizman; Asi Israelof; Ofer Shechter	₪1,000,000	51	5 May 2018	1 September 2018	Channel 13; Reshet
האח הגדול Big Brother	10	95	21	Tikva Gidon	Yarden Edri	Liron Weizman; Guy Zu-Aretz	₪1,000,000	47	1 January 2020	4 April 2020	Channel 13; Reshet
האח הגדול Big Brother	11	108	24	Zehava Ben	Jonathan "Joezi" Zirah	Liron Weizman; Guy Zu-Aretz	₪1,000,000	63	5 December 2020	22 March 2021	Channel 13; Reshet
האח הגדול Big Brother	12	103	24	Talia Ovadia	Bar Cohen	Liron Weizman; Guy Zu-Aretz	₪1,000,000	59	6 June 2022	17 September 2022	Channel 13; Reshet
האח הגדול Big Brother	13	104	27	Yuval Maatook	Stav Katzin	Liron Weizman; Guy Zu-Aretz	₪1,000,000	59	30 May 2023	10 September 2023	Channel 13; Reshet
האח הגדול Big Brother	14	112	27	Or Ben David	Frieda Uziel	Liron Weizman; Guy Zu-Aretz	₪1,000,000	65	2 June 2024	21 September 2024	Channel 13; Reshet
האח הגדול Big Brother	15	117	26	Yovel Levi	Erez Isakov	Liron Weizman; Guy Zu-Aretz	₪1,000,000	68	20 May 2025	13 September 2025	Channel 13; Reshet
האח הגדול Big Brother	16	110	29	Gal Rubin	Omer Tzipori	Liron Weizman; Guy Zu-Aretz; Kevin Rubin	₪1,000,000	65	10 March 2026	27 June 2026	Channel 13; Reshet
VIP האח הגדול Big Brother VIP	1	32	13	Dudi Melitz	Shimi Tavori	Erez Tal; Assi Azar	₪1,000,000	10	1 March 2009	31 March 2009	Channel 2 Keshet
VIP האח הגדול Big Brother VIP	2	38	12	Moshik Afia	Nir "Niro" Levy	Erez Tal; Assi Azar	Lexus SUV	12	10 May 2015	16 June 2015	Channel 2 Keshet
VIP האח הגדול Big Brother VIP	3	50	15	Asaf Goren	Shai Hai	Liron Weizman; Guy Zu-Aretz	₪250,000	23	12 January 2019	2 March 2019	Channel 13; Reshet
VIP האח הגדול Big Brother VIP	4	57	15	Oren Hazan	Tamir Verdi	Liron Weizman; Guy Zu-Aretz	₪250,000	29	10 July 2021	31 August 2021	Channel 13; Reshet

- Episodes from the original series season 9 to season 11 each including one reunion episode.

== See also ==
- Big Brother franchise
