= Tal Gilboa =

Israeli animal liberation and vegan activist

- טל גלבוע
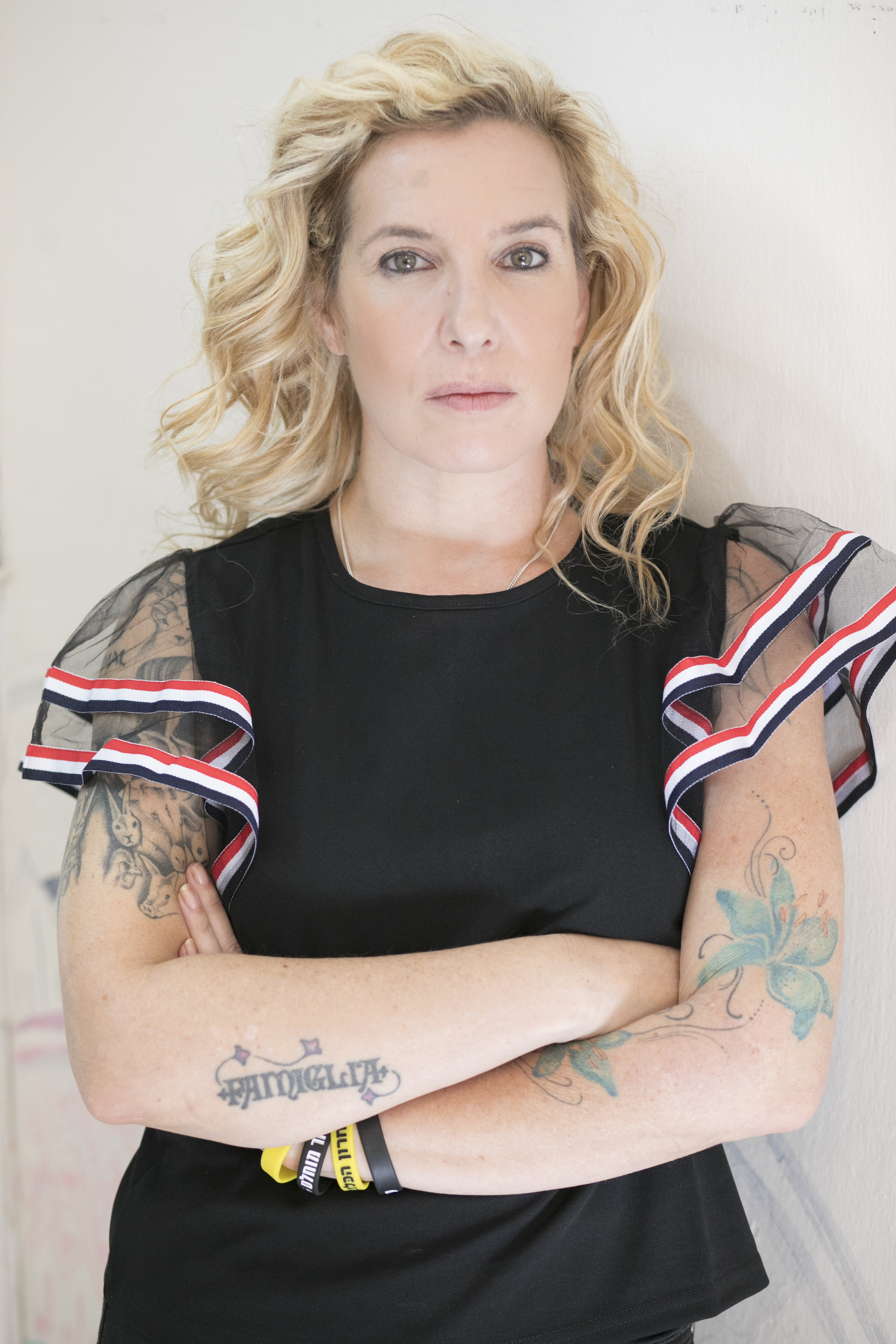
- Gilboa in 2017
- Born: June 16, 1978 (age 48); Ra'anana, Israel
- Occupation: Photographer
- Known for: Animal liberation and vegan advocacy
- Television: Big Brother (Israel)
- Children: 3

Tal Gilboa (Hebrew: טל גלבוע; born June 16, 1978) is an Israeli animal liberation and vegan activist. In 2013, she founded the Israeli Animal Liberation Front, renamed 'Total Liberation' in 2018. Gilboa won HaAh HaGadol 6, the sixth season of the Israeli version of the reality show Big Brother.

During 2019, Gilboa joined the Likud party but was not selected to be part of the Knesset. She was appointed by prime minister Netanyahu as advisor on animal rights issues.

== See also ==
- List of animal rights advocates
