= Big Brother (Israeli TV series) season 9 =

Big Brother
- Season 9
- Presented by: Liron Weizman; Asi Israelof; Ofer Shechter
- No. of days: 120
- No. of housemates: 27
- Winner: Israel Ogalbo
- Runner-up: Eliav Rachamin
- No. of episodes: 51 (Note: Include one reunion episode.)

Release
- Original network: Reshet 13
- Original release: 5 May – 1 September 2018

Season chronology
- ← Previous; Season 8 Next → Season 10

HaAh HaGadol 9 (Hebrew: האח הגדול 9; lit. The Big Brother 9) is the ninth season of the Israeli version of the reality show Big Brother. It's the first season in Reshet, as well as the first Israeli season in HDTV. It also became the longest-running Israeli season to date, lasting 120 days, surpassing the previous record of season 5, which lasted 115 days. The season premiered on 5 May 2018 and concluded on 1 September 2018, and was hosted by Liron Weizmann, Asi Israelof and Ofer Shechter.

== Housemates ==
Name	Day entered	Day exited	Status
Israel	1	56	Winner
Eliav	7	56	Runner-up
Avivit	36	56	Third Place
Avivit	21	30	Left
Meirav	1	56	Fourth Place
Maria	4	56	Fifth Place
Roy	4	52	Evicted
Adel	36	50	Evicted
Adel	21	30	Left
Daniel	7	47	Evicted
Eli	1	46	Walked
Amos	1	44	Evicted
Sima	7	44	Evicted
Moshiko	4	40	Evicted
Tomer	1	38	Ejected
Bar	7	38	Evicted
Liraz	1	34	Evicted
Maggie	7	30	Evicted
Omri	21	26	Left
Tiltil	21	26	Left
Neta	21	26	Left
Liron	1	22	Walked
Orly	1	22	Evicted
Samuel	4	18	Evicted
Shams	1	14	Evicted
Tammy	7	7	Walked
Ilan	4	7	Evicted
Ina	1	7	Evicted
Tay	1	3	Walked

=== Adel ===
- Adel Bespalov 25, Bat Yam.
- She participated in the second season of the Israeli Amazing Race.

=== Amos ===
- Amos Halfon 55, Nofekh

=== Avivit ===
- Avivit Bar Zohar 36, Tel Aviv.
- She previously appeared on HaAh HaGadol 4, where she was evicted less than a week before the final event.

=== Bar ===
- Bar Sandler 24, Rishon Letzion

=== Daniel ===
- Daniel Greenberg 24, Meitar

=== Eli ===
- Eli Zarka 30, Costa Rica

=== Eliav ===
- Eliav Rachamin 22, Qiryat Gat

=== Ilan ===
- Ilan Koren 56, Kfar Saba

=== Ina ===
- Ina Styoert 32, Tel Aviv

=== Israel ===
- Israel Ogalbo 27, Tel Aviv

=== Liraz ===
- Liraz Assayag 35, Petah Tikva

=== Liron ===
- Liron Ofir 25, Haifa

=== Maggie ===
- Maggie Tabibi 23, Holon

=== Maria ===
- Maria Domark 22, Kiryat Ono

=== Moshiko ===
- Moshiko Passal Givatayim

=== Meirav ===
- Meirav Israel 37, Netanya

=== Neta ===
- Neta Barazani 20, Bat Yam.
- She participated in the sixth season of the Israeli Amazing Race.

=== Omri ===
- Omri Ben Natan 32, Ramat Gan.
- He previously finished in third place on HaAh HaGadol 7.

=== Orly ===
- Orly Yechezkel 58, Bat Yam

=== Roy ===
- Roy Kornblum 23, Hod HaSharon

=== Samuel ===
- Samuel Hagai 35, New York

=== Shams ===
- Shams Marei Abumuch 35, Baqa al-Gharbiyye

=== Sima ===
- Sima Maimon Bakhar 41, Miami

=== Tammy ===
- Tammy Montag 28, Ramat Gan

=== Tay ===
- Tay Sharky 22, Herzliya

=== Tiltil ===
- Liron "Tiltil" Urpali 43, Ramat Gan.
- He was the winner of the seventh season of the Israeli Survivor Israeli in 2015 and participated in the fourth season of the Israeli Amazing Race.

=== Tomer ===
- Tomer "Rotchild" Ben Ya'akov 26, Tel Aviv

== Nominations table ==
	Week 1	Week 2	Week 3	Week 4	Week 5	Week 6	Week 7	Week 8	Week 9	Week 10	Week 11	Week 12	Week 13	Week 14	Week 15 Final	
Israel	Ina; Tomer	Nominations; Void	Shams; Tomer	Tomer; Liron	No; Nominations	No; Nominations	Liraz; Roy	Liraz; Roy	Meirav; Tomer	Moshiko; Sima	Daniel; Sima	No; Nominations	Finalist		Winner (Day 120)	
Eliav	Israel; Liraz	Nominations; Void	Liraz; Tammy	Tammy; Sima	No; Nominations	No; Nominations	Israel; Tomer	Israel; Liraz	Meirav; Roy	Eli; Sima	Maria; Sima	No; Nominations	No; Nominations	No; Nominations	Runner-Up (Day 120)	
Avivit	Not in House					Eliav to replace	Left (Day 50)	Sima; Meirav	Adel; Eli	Meirav; Sima	Meirav; Sima	No; Nominations	No; Nominations	No; Nominations	Third place (Day 120)	
Meirav	Tammy; Tomer	Nominations; Void	Liraz; Tammy	Liraz; Maria	No; Nominations	No; Nominations	Liraz; Roy	Liraz; Roy	Sima; Eliav	Avivit; Eli	Avivit; Eli	No; Nominations	No; Nominations	No; Nominations	Fourth place (Day 120)	
Maria	Ina; Tammy	Nominations; Void	Maggie; Liraz	Meirav; Maggie	No; Nominations	No; Nominations	Maggie; Liraz	Israel; Liraz	Roy; Tomer	Moshiko; Amos	Eli; Daniel	No; Nominations	No; Nominations	No; Nominations	Fifth place (Day 120)	
Roy	Tammy; Meirav	Nominations; Void	Liron; Orly	Liron; Sima	No; Nominations	No; Nominations	Maggie; Israel	Israel; Sima	Maria; Tomer	Eli; Sima	Eli; Amos	No; Nominations	No; Nominations	No; Nominations	Evicted (Day 113)	
Adel	Not in House					Tomer to replace	Left (Day 50)	Israel; Tomer	Avivit; Meirav	Moshiko; Sima	Eli; Daniel	No; Nominations	No; Nominations	No; Nominations	Evicted (Day 113)	
Daniel	Not in House							Tomer; Israel	Bar; Sima	Avivit; Adel	Eli; Maria	No; Nominations	No; Nominations	Evicted (Day 103)		
Eli	Not in House							Tomer; Roy	Eliav; Meirav	Meirav; Sima	Daniel; Sima	No; Nominations	Walked (Day 97)			
Amos	Not in House							Roy; Liraz	Daniel; Moshiko	Meirav; Maria	Meirav; Maria	No; Nominations	Evicted (Day 96)			
Sima	Liraz; Ina	Nominations; Void	Liraz; Samuel	Liraz; Samuel	No; Nominations	No; Nominations	Maggie; Liraz	Liraz; Roy	Meirav; Eliav	Avivit; Eli	Avivit; Israel	Evicted (Day 92)				
Moshiko	Not in House							Israel; Roy	Daniel; Roy	Eli; Israel	Evicted (Day 82)					
Tomer	Ina; Meirav	Nominations; Void	Shams; Liraz	Samuel; Liraz	No; Nominations	No; Nominations	Meirav; Eliav	Eliav; Liraz	Israel; Roy	Eli; Eliav	Ejected (Day 80)					
Bar	Not in House							Liraz; Roy	Daniel; Tomer	Evicted (Day 72)						
Liraz	Tay; Tammy	Nominations; Void	Tomer; Liron	Tomer; Liron	No; Nominations	No; Nominations	Israel; Meirav	Meirav; Tomer	Evicted (Day 65)							
Maggie	Tammy; Liraz	Head of House	Tammy; Maria	Tammy; Maria	No; Nominations	No; Nominations	Maria; Sima	Evicted (Day 58)								
Liron	Maria; Samuel	Nominations; Void	Liraz; Samuel	Samuel; Roy	No; Nominations	Walked (Day 43)										
Orly	Tammy; Maria	Nominations; Void	Shams; Liraz	Liraz; Samuel	No; Nominations	Evicted (Day 40)										
Samuel	Tomer; Maria	Nominations; Void	Tomer; Maria	Tomer; Sima	Evicted (Day 36)											
Tammy	Tay; Maria	Nominations; Void	Meirav; Maggie	Orly; Maggie	Walked (Day 35)											
Shams	Ina; Samuel	Nominations; Void	Tomer; Orly	Evicted (Day 30)												
Ilan	Ina; Meirav	Nominations; Void	Evicted (Day 19)													
Ina	Maria; Ilan	Evicted (Day 12)														
Tay	Ina; Eliav	Walked (Day 9)														
Temporary Housemates
Omri	Not in House					Israel to replace	Left (Day 50)									
Tiltil	Not in House					Liraz to replace	Left (Day 48)									
Neta	Not in House					Maggie to replace	Left (Day 48)									
Notes	1, 2	3	none	4	5	6, 7	8, 9	10	11, 12	13	14, 15	16	none		17	
Head of House	none	Maggie	none													
Against public vote	Ina; Liraz; Maria; Meirav; Tammy; Tomer	All; Housemates	Liraz; Shams; Tammy; Tomer	Liron; Liraz; Sima; Samuel; Tomer	All; Housemates	Avivit ↔ Eliav; Adel ↔ Tomer; Tiltil ↔ Liraz; Neta ↔ Maggie; Omri ↔ Israel	Israel; Liraz; Maggie; Meirav; Roy; Tomer	Israel; Liraz; Roy; Tomer	Avivit; Adel; Eli; Bar; Israel; Moshiko; Maria	Avivit; Eli; Meirav; Moshiko; Sima	Daniel; Eli; Maria; Sima	All; Housemates	All; Housemates			
Against public vote	Ina; Liraz; Maria; Meirav; Tammy; Tomer	All; Housemates	Liraz; Shams; Tammy; Tomer	Liron; Liraz; Sima; Samuel; Tomer	All; Housemates	Avivit ↔ Eliav; Adel ↔ Tomer; Tiltil ↔ Liraz; Neta ↔ Maggie; Omri ↔ Israel	Israel; Liraz; Maggie; Meirav; Roy; Tomer	Israel; Liraz; Roy; Tomer	Avivit; Adel; Eli; Bar; Israel; Moshiko; Maria	Avivit; Eli; Meirav; Moshiko; Sima	Daniel; Eli; Maria; Sima	Israel; Roy	All; Housemates			
Walked	Tay	none		Tammy	none	Liron	none					Eli	none			
Ejected	none									Tomer	none					
Evicted	Ina; Fewest votes to save	Ilan; Fewest votes to save	Shams; Fewest votes to save	Samuel; Fewest votes to save	Orly; Fewest votes to save	Tomer to fake evict	Maggie; Fewest votes to save	Liraz; Fewest votes to save	Bar; Fewest votes to save	Moshiko; Fewest votes to save	Sima; Fewest votes to save	Amos; Fewest votes to save	Daniel; Fewest votes to save	Adel; Fewest votes to save	Maria; Fewest votes (out of 5)	Meirav; Fewest votes (out of 4)
Evicted	Ina; Fewest votes to save	Ilan; Fewest votes to save	Shams; Fewest votes to save	Samuel; Fewest votes to save	Orly; Fewest votes to save	Eliav to fake evict	Maggie; Fewest votes to save	Liraz; Fewest votes to save	Bar; Fewest votes to save	Moshiko; Fewest votes to save	Sima; Fewest votes to save	Amos; Fewest votes to save	Daniel; Fewest votes to save	Adel; Fewest votes to save	Avivit; Fewest votes (out of 3)	Eliav; Fewest votes (out of 2)
Evicted	Ina; Fewest votes to save	Ilan; Fewest votes to save	Shams; Fewest votes to save	Samuel; Fewest votes to save	Orly; Fewest votes to save	Eliav to fake evict	Maggie; Fewest votes to save	Liraz; Fewest votes to save	Bar; Fewest votes to save	Moshiko; Fewest votes to save	Sima; Fewest votes to save	Israel; Most votes to be finalist	Daniel; Fewest votes to save	Roy; Fewest votes to save	Avivit; Fewest votes (out of 3)	Eliav; Fewest votes (out of 2)
Evicted	Ina; Fewest votes to save	Ilan; Fewest votes to save	Shams; Fewest votes to save	Samuel; Fewest votes to save	Orly; Fewest votes to save	Israel to fake evict	Maggie; Fewest votes to save	Liraz; Fewest votes to save	Bar; Fewest votes to save	Moshiko; Fewest votes to save	Sima; Fewest votes to save	Israel; Most votes to be finalist	Daniel; Fewest votes to save	Roy; Fewest votes to save	Israel; Most votes to win	

=== Notes ===
Temporary Housemates
- ^1: Housemates entered on Day 1 got the power to give one of the housemates entered on Day 2 an immunity for the first eviction. They chose Liron.
- ^2: On Day 9, Tay had left the house temporarily to receive medical attention. On Day 10, It was revealed that he would not be returning to the house.
- ^3: The original nominees were Orly, Liron, Liraz, Sima and Tammy, but the housemates had violated the rules from the beginning of the season, all housemates are nominated for eviction this week. Maggie, who was the Head of House this week, also lost her immunity.
- ^4: On Day 35, Tammy had left the house, due to apparently serious family issues.
- ^5: This week was a week of surprises. On Day 40, an eviction has taken place, when the housemates hadn't known about before.
- ^6: On Day 43, there was another entrance of new housemates, which the existing ones also haven't known yet. Also, the existing housemates don't know that the new housemates won't be in the house for a long time. They are taking part in a secret mission which Big Brother organized. It is possible, that one of those housemates would be a permanent housemate, that can advance to the final. This situation depends on the audience's decision only. In the end, Adel and Avivit had returned to the house as permanent housemates.
- ^7: On Day 43, Liron had left the house, for personal reasons, including his longings for his partner.
- ^8: Tomer was automatically nominated for eviction by Big Brother, due to planning nominations with Meirav.
- ^9: During the spontaneous task in the house, Roy was spontaneously asked by Big Brother to nominate for eviction in front of the housemates.
- ^10: In this week, eviction took place about four days after the entry of the new housemates, eviction in which they were immune from it. Moreover, on the exact evening of the entrance, they were asked to make their nominations in front of all of the housemates.
- ^11: In this week, Amos was awarded immunity from eviction after a successful secret mission of his and Meirav, in which they had to pretend to be exes from the far past.
- ^12: In this week, the housemates were asked to name two housemates they would like to save from eviction.
- ^13: Tomer was ejected from the house for violating the house rules.
- ^14: This week, as part of the mission around the world in Korea, the housemates of North Korea were nominated for eviction.
- ^15: Eli decided to leave the house on the night between Day 97 and Day 98.
- ^16: Housemates were asked to give the name of a housemate who they think should receive a ticket to the final, three weeks before the finale. The result was a tie between Roy and Israel, and the decision was passed on to the viewers. Israel received the most votes. Big Brother surprised the housemates and announced that Israel had an opportunity to win a new car, but he has to give up the ticket to the final if he took the car. Israel was forced to make the decision live and decided to give up the car. Israel has received the final ticket, while the car will be the prize for the housemate who reaches the second place.
- ^17: The public were voting to win rather than to save.

== Nominations totals received ==
	Week 1	Week 2	Week 3	Week 4	Week 5	Week 6	Week 7	Week 8	Week 9	Week 10	Week 11	Week 12	Week 13	Week 14	Final	Total
Israel	1	-	0	0	-	-	3	6	1	1	1	-	Finalist		Winner	13
Eliav	1	-	0	0	-	-	1	1	3	1	0	-	-	-	Runner-Up	7
Avivit	Not in House					-	Left	-	1	3	2	-	-	-	Third place	6
Meirav	3	-	1	1	-	-	2	2	5	3	2	-	-	-	Fourth place	19
Maria	5	-	2	2	-	-	1	0	1	1	3	-	-	-	Fifth place	15
Roy	0	-	0	1	-	-	2	6	4	0	0	-	-	-	Evicted	13
Adel	Not in House					-	Left	-	1	1	0	-	-	-	Evicted	2
Daniel	Not in House							-	3	-	4	-	-	Evicted		7
Eli	Not in House							-	1	6	5	-	Walked			12
Amos	Not in House							-	-	1	1	-	Evicted			2
Sima	0	-	-	3	-	-	1	2	2	6	4	Evicted				18
Moshiko	Not in House							-	1	3	Evicted					4
Tomer	3	-	4	3	-	-	1	4	4	0	Ejected					19
Bar	Not in House							-	1	Evicted						1
Liraz	3	-	7	4	-	-	4	8	Evicted							26
Maggie	0	-	2	2	-	-	3	Evicted								7
Omri	Not in House					-	Left									N/A
Tiltil	Not in House					-	Left									N/A
Neta	Not in House					-	Left									N/A
Liron	-	-	2	3	-	Walked										5
Orly	0	-	2	1	-	Evicted										3
Samuel	2	-	2	4	Evicted											8
Tammy	6	-	3	2	Walked											11
Shams	0	-	3	Evicted												3
Ilan	1	-	Evicted													1
Ina	7	Evicted														7
Tay	2	Walked														2
