= Assi Azar =

Israeli television personality

- אסי עזר
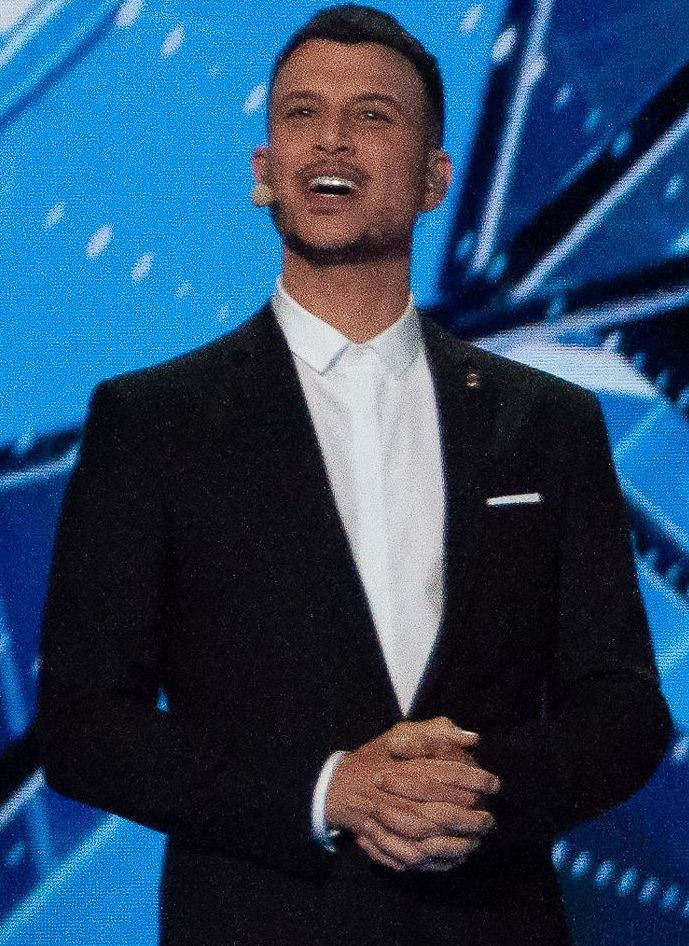
- Azar during the Eurovision Song Contest 2019
- Born: 10 June 1979 (age 46); Holon, Israel
- Occupation: Television presenter
- Years active: 2004–present
- Known for: Hosting Big Brother - Israel, The Next Star and Eurovision 2019
- Spouse: Albert Escolà Benet (m. 2016)

Assi Azar (Hebrew: אסי עזר; born 10 June 1979) is an Israeli television host and screenwriter. He is the creator of the romantic comedy TV series Beauty and the Baker (2013 - 2021) and co-creator of the new TV series, Metukim (2024–present).

== Biography ==
Assi Azar was born in Holon, Israel. He is of Bukharan-Jewish and Yemenite descent. In 2005, Azar came out as gay. Shortly after, he began to create the documentary film, Mom and Dad: I Have Something to Tell You. On 11 April 2016, Azar married his Spanish boyfriend Albert Escolà Benet at a ceremony in Barcelona.

Azar is an LGBT rights advocate. In 2009, he was listed among the most 100 influential gay people in the world by OUT Magazine.

In January 2022, the actor Yehuda Nahari alleged that Azar sexually harassed him during a job interview at Azar's home.

== Media career ==
He co-hosted Big Brother - Israel with Erez Tal until 2015 and The Next Star with Rotem Sela. He is also the creator of the romantic comedy TV series, Beauty and the Baker.

His first program was on the online show KIK. In 2004–2005 Assi co-hosted TV youth show Exit. Later he participated in the programs Good Evening with Guy Pines and The Champion: Locker Room, as well as the satirical programs Trapped 24, Talk to My Agent and reality series The Show which was cancelled after only two episodes due to bad ratings.

Azar hosted the Eurovision Song Contest 2019 in Tel Aviv alongside Lucy Ayoub, Erez Tal and Bar Refaeli. It was reported that Tal and Refaeli would be the main hosts, while Azar and Ayoub would host the green room. On 28 January, Azar and Ayoub hosted the contest's semi-final allocation draw at the Tel Aviv Museum of Art.

== See also ==
- List of Eurovision Song Contest presenters

Preceded by (Portugal) Sílvia Alberto, Daniela Ruah, Catarina Furtado and Filomena Cautela	Eurovision Song Contest presenter 2019; With: Erez Tal, Bar Refaeli and Lucy Ayoub	Succeeded by (Netherlands) Edsilia Rombley, Chantal Janzen, Jan Smit and Nikkie de Jager (2021)
