= Erez Tal =

Israeli television and radio host (born 1961)

- ארז טל
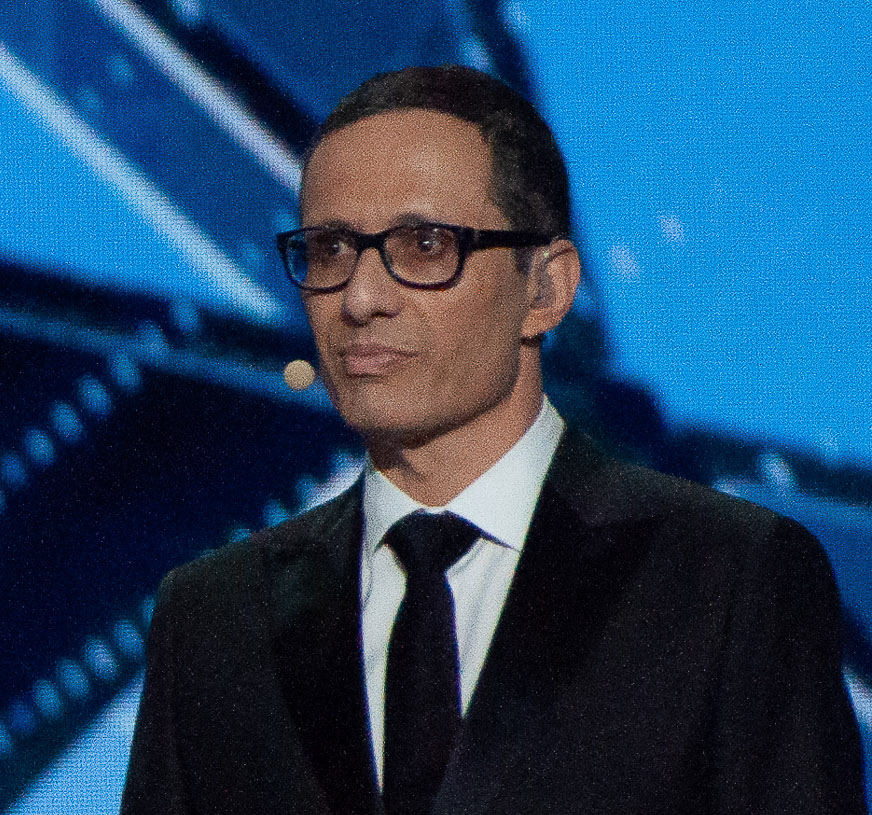
- Tal hosting the Eurovision Song Contest in Tel Aviv in 2019
- Born: Erez Moshe Ben-Tulila; 27 July 1961 (age 65); Tel Aviv, Israel
- Education: Ironi Alef High School
- Occupations: TV and radio personality
- Years active: 1983–present
- Spouse: Gili Levi (m. 2005)
- Children: 2 daughters

Erez Moshe Tal (Hebrew: ארז טל; born 27 July 1961) is an Israeli television host.

== Early life ==
Born as Erez Moshe Ben-Tulila in Tel Aviv, Israel, to Jewish parents. His father, Aharon Ben-Tulila, immigrated from Algeria, whereas his mother Edna is Israeli-born. His family Hebraized its surname to Tal (dew in Hebrew) when he was four years old.

== Career ==
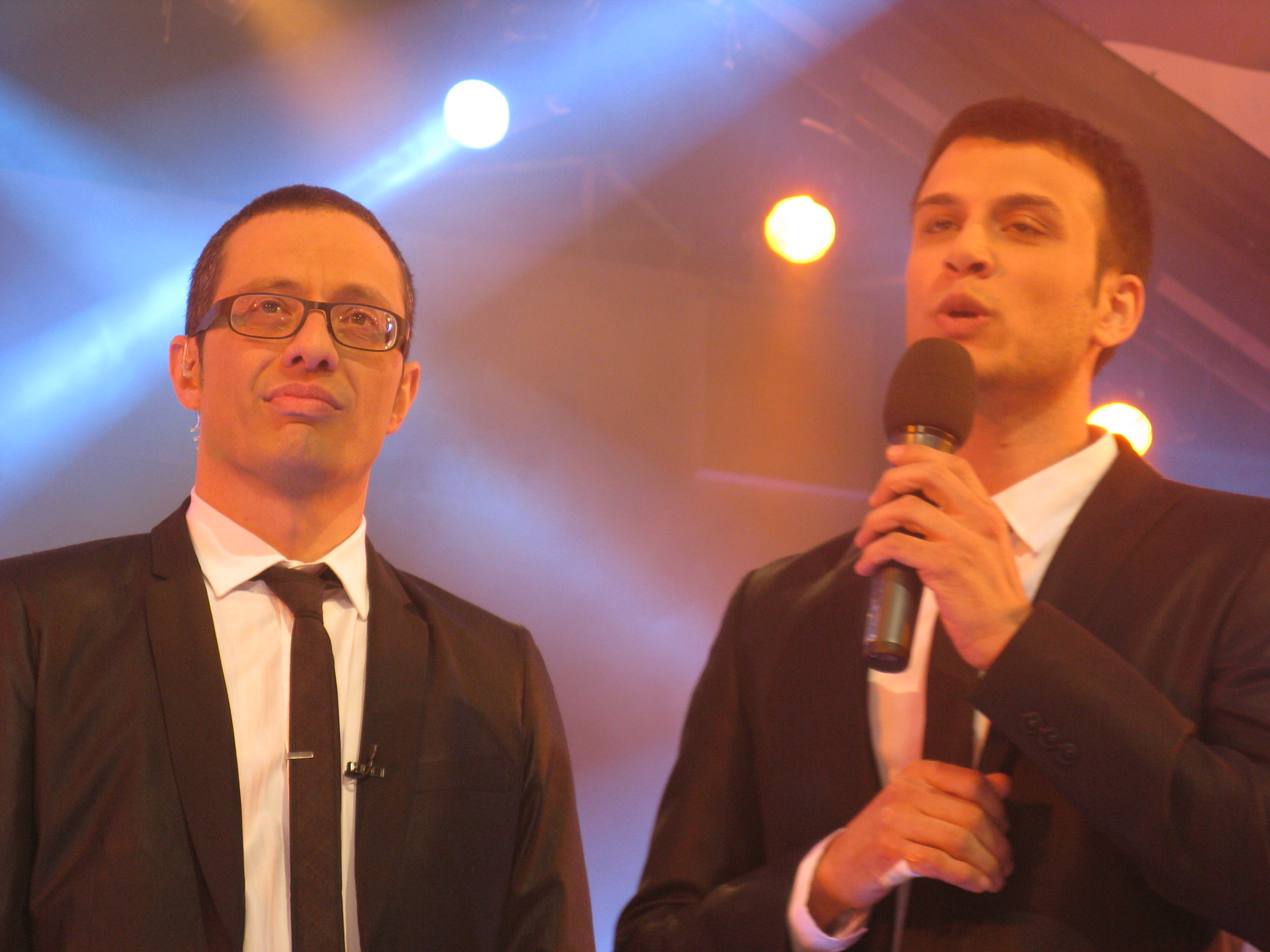
Tal (left) hosting the Israeli version of Big Brother with Assi Azar in 2008.

His first hit program was Ma Yesh? ("What's Up?"), broadcast on Galatz, Israel's IDF Radio, where he started his partnership with Avri Gilad. Tal and Gilad co-hosted TV show Ha'olam Ha'erev (The World Tonight) in the early 1990s, broadcast on the then-experimental Channel 2. When Channel 2 became Israel's first commercial television station, Tal hosted and produced the Israeli edition of Wheel of Fortune, and later devised two different program formats: The Vault that was sold to several foreign TV stations, and The Brain.

In 2008, he hosted the Israeli version of the reality show, Big Brother, named HaAh HaGadol.

Tal also participates in comedy programs: Only in Israel, which he created, opposite Orna Banai, and Night Club with Maya Dagan and others. He introduced several comedians to wider audiences, notably Assi Azar who co-hosted with him the successful reality format HaAch HaGadol; and Guri Alfi who acted in many comedy shows such as Shiduray Ha'mahapecha (The Revolution Broadcast).

Tal was one of the Israeli commentators (alongside Idit Hershkowitz) for the Eurovision Song Contest 2018 grand final, the first time the country provided a TV commentary for Eurovision.

Tal hosted the Eurovision Song Contest 2019 in Tel Aviv alongside Bar Refaeli, Assi Azar and Lucy Ayoub.

== See also ==
- List of Eurovision Song Contest presenters

Preceded by (Portugal) Sílvia Alberto, Daniela Ruah, Catarina Furtado and Filomena Cautela	Eurovision Song Contest presenter 2019; With: Bar Refaeli, Assi Azar and Lucy Ayoub	Succeeded by (Netherlands) Edsilia Rombley, Chantal Janzen, Jan Smit and Nikkie de Jager (2021)
