= Tuvia Tenenbom =

Israeli-American theater director and writer (born 1957)

- טוביה טננבום
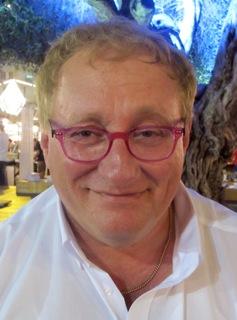
- Born: September 9, 1957 (age 69); Bnei Brak, Israel
- Occupations: Theater director; Playwright; Author; Journalist
- Known for: Founding artistic director of the Jewish Theater of New York
- Notable work: Catch the Jew!; Father of the Angels; The Lies They Tell

Tuvia Tenenbom (Hebrew: טוביה טננבום; born 1957) is an Israeli-American theater director, playwright and author who is the founding artistic director of the Jewish Theater of New York, the only English-speaking Jewish theater in New York City. Tenenbom was called the "founder of a new form of Jewish theatre" by the French Le Monde and a "New Jew" by the Israeli Maariv.

Tuvia Tenenbom grew up in an ultra orthodox family in Bnei Brak, Israel. His mother survived the Holocaust and he states that his father was a refugee. Tuvia left Israel and moved to the United States when he was 24. There he founded the Jewish Theater of New York, which he directed and managed with his life partner Isi for decades.

He lived for 1.5 years in Jerusalem's Mea She'arim haredi community where he wrote his book Careful, Beauties Ahead! (2024). When not working on his immersive book writing, he lives between New York City and Germany according to Times of Israel.

== Writing ==
Tenenbom has written over sixteen plays for The Jewish Theater of New York, among them: The Last Virgin, Father of the Angels, and One Hundred Gates.

Tenenbom has written for newspapers and websites. Tenenbom was a political columnist for The Forward and for the German Zeit Online. He is a frequent contributor for Die Zeit.

=== Books ===
Tenenbom's book I Sleep in Hitler's Room, published by an imprint of The Jewish Theater of New York, is a psychological travelogue through present-day Germany. The book details the wide spread of modern anti-Semitism in Europe. The book received strong endorsement from the National Review, which called it "a tremendous book." In December 2012, a German translation of Tenenbom's book titled Allein unter Deutschen (Alone Among Germans) was published by Suhrkamp Verlag of Berlin. Critics differed widely in their opinions of the work: Spiegel's Wolfgang Höbel and Jakob Augstein were highly critical of the book. Die Tageszeitung (taz) was extremely critical, writing that Tenenbom's book offered "zero insight", while Jungle World called the book "a gem." The German-Jewish journalist Henryk M. Broder praised Tenenbom's "one-sidedness," comparing him to both Michael Moore and to Sacha Baron Cohen's Borat. German TV station WDR, which Tenenbom accused in his book of assisting an anti-Semitic group in Cologne, dismissed the book as "embarrassing or dumb". Deutschlandfunk advised its listeners not to buy the book and encouraged those who had already bought it to bring it back to the bookstore. Evelyn Finger of Die Zeit praised the book, calling it "courageous" and describing its content as a "Kamikaze ride of discovery into Germany's national character." In Germany's Jewish weekly Jüdische Allgemeine, which is published by the Jewish community of Germany, Hannes Stein endorsed Tenenbom's book.

Tenenbom's book Catch the Jew!, published by Gefen Publishing recounts the adventures of Tuvia Tenenbom, who wanders around Israel of our time calling himself "Tobi the German." The author started to write the book in 2013 and ended writing it in 2014. He dedicates the book to his partner, Isi Tenenbom. In the course of interviews Tuvia extracts information, sentiments, hidden theories and delusional visions motivating the miscellany of peoples forming the present-day Holy Land. Catch the Jew! was published in Israel in September 2014 by Sela Meir publishers and reached the No. 1 spot on Haaretz, Steimatzky and Yedioth Ahronot best-seller lists, winning praise by Israeli critics. Mida called Tenenbom "the ultimate leftist and humanist who loves all people, is everything the left pretends to be but is not," while Channel 2 TV named it "the most important book in the last five years," and Haaretz advised its readers to "read Tenenbom's book; we don't have the luxury not to know what he's telling us." Yossi Klein Halevi, senior fellow at the Shalom Harman Institute, said about the book: "One of the funniest books I've read in years - and one of the most hearbreaking." And Abe Foxman, National Director of the Anti-Defamation League, commented: "Catch the Jew! Is a very serious book. It will entertain you while it will disturb you." In Germany, the book came out in November 2014 by the publishing house of Suhrkamp under the title "Allein unter Juden" (Alone Among Jews). The book consists of 59 chapters.

In October 2016, Tenenbom's third book, Allein unter Amerikanern was published by Suhrkamp Verlag in Berlin, Germany. In March 2017 it was published in English by Gefen Publishing under the title The Lies They Tell. Tuvia Tenenbom travels through America to find out who are the Americans, the people who make up America. A contributor to Publishers Weekly wrote: "Brutal, irreverent, and cutting, Tenenbom’s riveting book aims to disrupt American complacency."

Tenenbom's fourth book, Hello, Refugees! came out in English in July 2017, following its publication in German by Suhrkamp Verlag in March 2017, under the title Allein unter Flüchtlingen. In Hello, Refugees! Tenenbom chronicles his visits to many refugee camps in Germany, reporting of horrific conditions in most of those camps. Additionally, Hello, Refugees! contains interviews with politicians and activists from the far-right to the far-left, whom he asked to explain to him why has Germany taken in more refugees than other European countries.

Tenenbom's fifth book, The Taming of the Jew, came out in English in February 2021, following its publication in Germany in February 2020, under the title Allein unter Briten. In The Taming of the Jew, Tenenbom chronicles the rise of anti-Semitism in the UK and the Jewish community's reluctance to effectively deal with it. David Herman, reviewing the book for the British The Article, writes: "This is a frightening book and deserves to be read."

Tenenbom's sixth book, Careful, Beauties Ahead! was published in May 2024. Originally published in German under the title Gott spricht Jiddisch by the Berlin publishing company of Suhrkamp in Germany, where it was a Spiegel Best Seller. The book recounts Tenenbom's journey in the Mea Shearim neighborhood of Jerusalem, where he lived for over a year. Tenenbom examines the various ultra-Orthodox groups in Israel in general and in Jerusalem in particular, recounts interviews with various Rebbes (Hasidic Grand Rabbis) and leaders of "Lithuanian" yeshivas, visits the homes of many Haredi families, and chats with whomever he meets while walking around. Parallel to the research for the book, Tenenbom produced and directed a companion documentary film titled God Speaks Yiddish.

=== Film ===
In 2024, Tenenbom directed the documentary God Speaks Yiddish, which serves as a cinematic companion to his research for the book Careful, Beauties Ahead!. The film provides a visual account of Tenenbom's unscripted encounters within the ultra-Orthodox community of Mea Shearim and features appearances by Hasidic singer Motty Steinmetz, political scientist Dan Schueftan, and Rabbi Israel Meir Hirsh. The documentary was awarded "Best Documentary" at the 2024 Berlin Indie Film Festival and was an official selection at the Jewish Film Festival Berlin-Brandenburg and the Jewish Film Festival Vienna.
