= Yossi Mor =

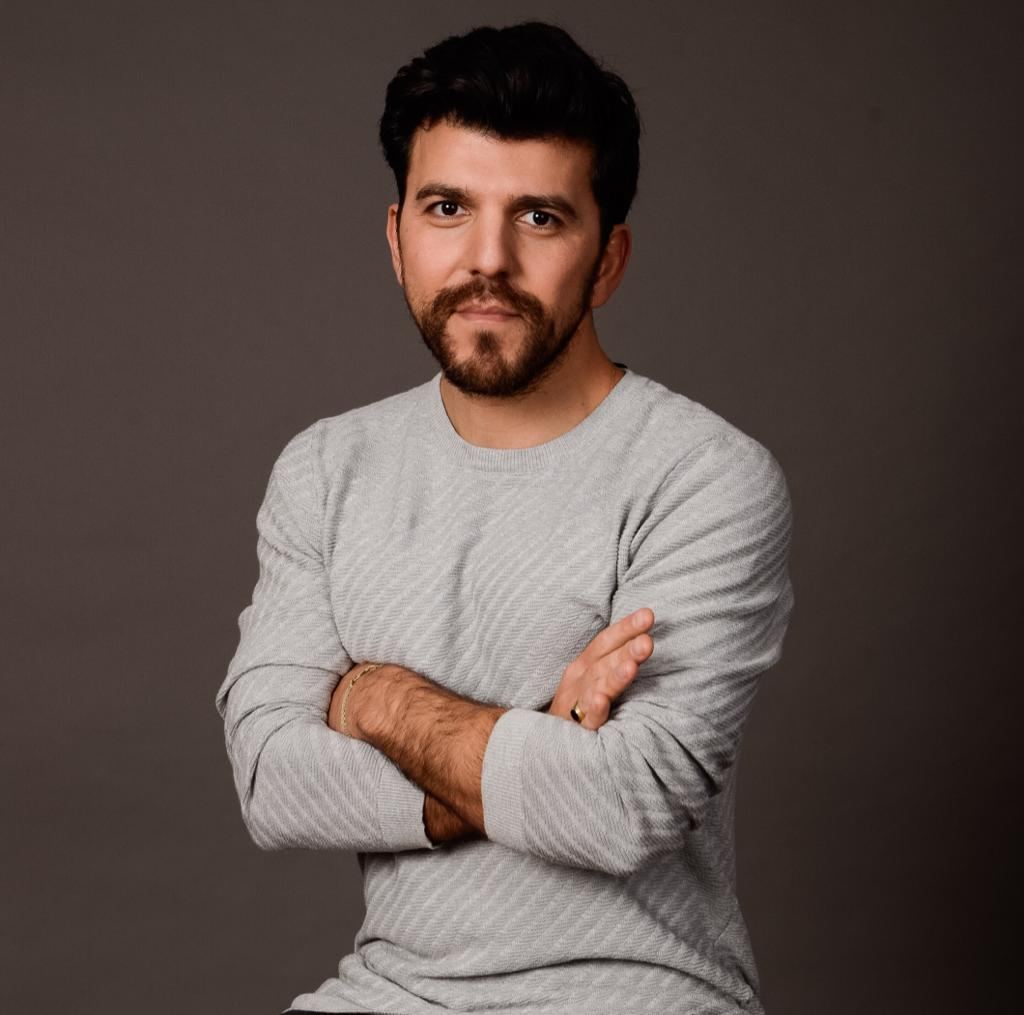
Yossi Mor 2021

Yossi Mor (Hebrew: יוסי מור; born on December 21, 1983) is an Israeli musician, keyboardist, musical producer, and musical programmer.

== Biography ==
Born on December 21, 1983, in Lod, to Aaron and Sima Mirilashvili, who immigrated from Georgia in the 1970s. Mor went to Amal Alef Highschool, in Ramla, and after military discharge started his studies in Rimon School of Music, majoring in performance and composition. In 2017 Mor accompanied Shiri Maimon in a performance for US president Donald Trump, during his visit in Israel.

== Career ==
His musical path began at the age of 6, when Mor started studying piano and organ with his aunt.

=== Participation in live shows ===
In high school, together with Eyal Mazig and Dudi Bar David Yossi founded a rock band named 'The Charlie Case Kingdom'. In 2003 studied in Rimon School of Music. In 2005 Mor joined the 'Hadorbanim' band as a keyboard player, during the tour with their album Levi. In 2006 joined the musical band accompanying Shiri Maimon, along with musicians like Yonathan Fridge and Danny Schneidermann. In 2009 participated as a keyboardist in “Good Vibrations”, a tribute concert to the Beach Boys. Between 2010-2018 played in a joint performance of Shiri Maimon and Shimon Buskila, and in the recording of their joint album, which reached Platinum. In 2012 joined the musical band that accompanies Kobi Aflalo during his various performances. From 2015 till 2017 was part of Guy Mazig's musical band, and played on the recording of the debut album “HaShahor HaHadash” (The New Black). In 2014-2017 Mor played in the musical band of the “Ma Kashur” trio, in the “Ma Kashur Osim Sameakh” performance. During those years Yossi also played in Rotem Cohen’s musical band in the "El Ha-Olam Shelah" (“To Your World”) and "Lo Dimyanti" (“I never imagined”) performances. In 2020-2021 played in Zehava Ben’s musical band. In 2021 joined the musical band of Rita’s and Rami Kleinstein’s joint performance. In addition, Yossi played the keyboards in many different performances of the most famous Israeli artists. He accompanied Shlomo Gronich, Harel Skaat Shefita, Subliminal, Narkis, Ishay Ribo, Nurit Galron, Omer Adam, Ariel Zilber, Avraham Tal, Dikla, Idan Amedi and others. Mor played in known singles, such as: "Na'gat Li Balev" (“You Touched My Heart”) and "Eten Lakh" (“I Will Give You”) by Eyal Golan, "Every Man's Dream" covered by Subliminal, "El Ha-Olam Shelakh" (“Into Your World”) by Rotem Cohen, "Mishehu Aher" (‘Somebody Else”) by Dudi Bar David and Maya Herman, "Ose Ksamim Ve-Rock'n'Roll" (“Making Magic and Rock’n’Roll”) by Guy Mazig, "Taltalim" (“Curls”) by Nurit Galron, "Banalia Lifney Ha-Shkia" (“Banalia Before Sunset”) by Shlomo Gronich, and many others. Mor played and recorded the albums “Into Your World” and “I Never Imagined” by Rotem Cohen, both of which reached gold, and on "HaMar'ot" (“Mirrors”) album by Kobi Aflalo, which also reached gold. Yossi was also a keyboardist on many musical reality shows, such as the "HaKokhav HaBa" Rising Star for Eurovision, "The Voice" Israel, and Aviv vs. Eyal, and in Tal Berman's show, “Friday with Tal Berman”. Mor was a part of a team of musical producers in The Four show on its only season.

=== Cultural performances ===
Since 2012 Mor has been a keyboardist in the house band of the ACUM prize annual awards. In 2014 Mor played at the performance “This is the same love”, a tribute to Arik Einstein. The performance was held at the Yarkon Park, in front of tens of thousands of people.

=== Singles production ===
Mor has made a musical arrangement for many singles, including "Tsone'akh Lemala" ("Falling upstairs") and "Toda She-Bata Le-Khayay" ("Thank You for Coming into My Life") by Kobi Aflalo, "I Will Give You" by Eyal Golan, "Margish" ("Feeling"), and "Mekomot Yafim" ("Beautiful Places") by Rotem Cohen. Mor has musically produced the cover version for Ehud Manor's '"Be-Shana Ha-Ba'a" ("Next Year") song by Shiri Maimon. In addition, Mor has produced for Kobi Aflalo a cover version for the song "Tefilah" (“Prayer”) by Ofra Haza, as part of "Kol HaNeshama" (“Voice of the Soul – Singing Ofra Haza”) project performed by Kobi Aflalo.

=== Concerts production ===
Mor is a productive musical producer. Among the rest, he has produced performances for many artists over the years. In 2014 Mor produced the Mar'ot (Mirror) performance for Kobi Aflalo. In 2015 he produced the Into Your World performance by Rotem Cohen. In 2016 he produced the I Never Imagined show, also by Rotem Cohen. In 2017 Mor produced the acoustic show UNPLUGGED for Shiri Maimon. In 2020 Mor has musically produced the International Women’s day show, featuring top Israeli female artists, including: Rita, Sarit Hadad, Yardena Arazi, Gali Atari, Eden Ben Zaken, Nasrin Kadri, Shiri Maimon, Netta Barzilai, and others. The show was cancelled due to the Coronavirus outbreak in Israel. In 2021 Mor has musically produced Zehava Ben’s show, after Zehava won the “Big Brother” show. During that year Yossi produced the “LIVE & PARTY” performance for Shiri Maimon, and the "Toda SheBat Le-Khayay" ("Thank You For Coming Into My Life") tour of Kobi Aflalo. Mor is creating music using Ableton software. He used it to produce the concerts of Ishay Ribo, Roy Zu-Arets and Guy Zu-Aretz, Zehava Ben and others. Mor is teaching music production using this software.

== Personal life ==
Mor is married to the actress and singer Lilah Eliash. The two are living in the centre of Israel.
