= HaYehudim =

Israeli hard rock band

HaYehudim היהודים
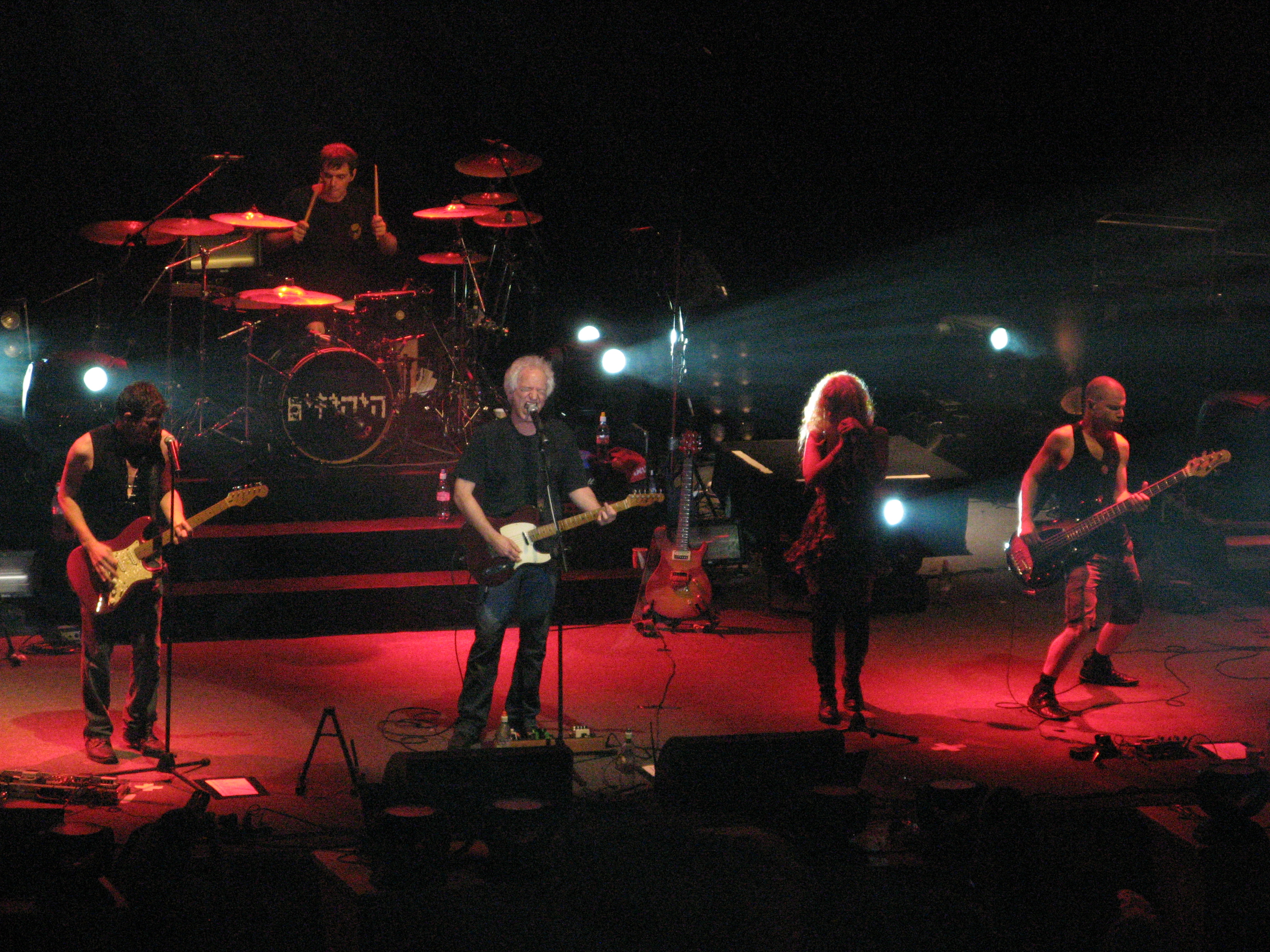
- Hayehudim in concert with Shalom Hanoch, 2010

Background information
- Origin: Tel Aviv, Israel
- Genres: Hard rock
- Years active: 1992–present
- Labels: Hatav Hashmini, Hed Arzi
- Members: Tom Petrover; Orit Shahaf; Yahav Lipinski; Zak Soulam; Greg Pearl; Eran Mitleman

HaYehudim or I.U.D.M (Hebrew: היהודים, lit. The Jews) is an Israeli hard rock band, formed in 1992 by (now married) couple Tom Petrover and Orit Shahaf, who share guitar playing and vocal duties. The band gained success in Israel, despite relative commercial disregard in its first years. They sold over 200,000 albums in Israel.

The band is known for its energetic, dark-themed songs and loud vocals. The band sings mostly in Hebrew, although in later albums they have several songs in English.

== History ==
The band's first album, Metziut Nifredet (Hebrew: מציאות נפרדת, Separate Reality), was released in 1995 through Hed Arzi Music. Several music videos from the album were often played on Israeli television, but not on the radio, and initially the album sold poorly. However, the band continued playing live shows all over Israel, gaining a cult following. The band received its first major national exposure when Michael Behagen decided to incorporate seven of their songs into his film Forever Young. Following the film's broadcast on television in December 1996, sales of the band's album skyrocketed, and to this day, it remains one of the best-selling rock albums in Israeli music history. The debut album went gold in 1998 and later on achieved double platinum.

The second album, self-titled HaYehudim, and released in 1998, and was an immediate success despite continuing disregard from mainstream media, making HaYehudim one of the leading rock bands in Israel. This album also attained gold status.

In 1999, Hayehudim were elected as Band of the Year on Galey Tzahal, Israel's national radio station. The same year, they opened the Metallica concert in Israel, and in 2000, the band opened a Rage Against the Machine concert in Israel as well.

Four years after their second album, Hayehudim released a third studio album by the name of Pahad Mavet (Hebrew: פחד מוות, Fear of Death) in 2002. The next year, Hayehudim released their first live album – a double CD and DVD set named Hayhudim LIVE. The live album was a great success, and the following year the band released a second live album, this time of an unplugged show.

In 2007, Hayehudim released their fourth studio album, Forte (Hebrew: פורטה). In musicology, the term forte means loud or strong, and the name was chosen because if you hadn't had enough of Hayehudim till now, you're about to get Hayehudim forte (meaning Hayehudim extra-strong, as Tom Petrover explained in a radio interview). The album went gold and won Album of the Year in the Israeli Music Channel awards.

In 2015, the band released their most recent album, Yoter Lo (Hebrew: יותר לא, No More).

== Name ==
The name "HaYehudim", literally meaning The Jews, was proposed to the band by Eldad Ziv, an Israeli theatre director and musician, and by Roy Zu-Arets, the music producer who produced the band's debut album Metziut Nifredet. Despite being a provocative name, the band's members liked it and decided to use it.

== In relation to historical events ==
All of the band's albums came out in times of instability in Israel, which was reflected in the dark and heavy music and lyrics. Their debut album, Metziut Nifredet, came out just a few months before Yitzhak Rabin's assassination in August 1995, while the political discourse in Israel was heavily polarized regarding The Oslo Accords. The following self-titled album came out in 1998. The late 90s in Israel saw many major terror attacks and fear was rampant in day-to-day life. Their third albun, Pahad Mavet, released in 2002, during the second Intifada (just after Operation Defensive Shield) when the Israeli Defence Forces faced many casualties in attempt to quell uprisings in the West Bank. The fourth album, Forte, came out in 2007, following The second Lebanon War, and the next album, Yoter Lo, was released and even delayed due to Operation Protective Edge. Both of which had the army entering southern Lebanon and the Gaza Strip respectively in response to attacks and terror activities carried out from these regions.

== Members ==
Current members

- Tom Petrover – guitar, vocals
- Orit Shachaf – lead vocals, backing guitar
- Yahav Lipinski – drums
- Zak Soulam – guitar
- Greg Pearl – bass
- Eran Mitleman – keyboards

Former members

- Avi Yifrach – bass
- Smulik Bogdov – guitar
- Asher Pedi – drums
- Elad Keren – bass
- Yiftach Shachaf – guitar
- Eitan Veksler – guitar
- Avi Strool – bass
- Roy Zu-Arets – keyboards
- Daniel Brecher – guitar
- Adam Peri – keyboards
- Guy Be'er – guitar

== Discography ==
=== Studio albums ===
- Metziut Nifredet ("Separate Reality") – 1995
- HaYehudim – 1998
- Pakhad Mavet ("Scary as hell") – 2002
- Forte – 2007
- Yoter Lo ("No More") – 2015

=== Live albums ===
- HaYehudim LIVE (live CD and DVD) – 2003
- HaYehudim Unplugged (unplugged concert) – 2004
