= Behagen =

Behagen is a surname. Notable people with the surname include:

- Gysbert Behagen (1725–1783), German-Danish merchant
- Michael Behagen (born 1952), Israeli film director, writer, and musician
- Ron Behagen (born 1951), American basketball player
