= Moshe Morgenstern =

Jewish Greco-Roman style wrestler

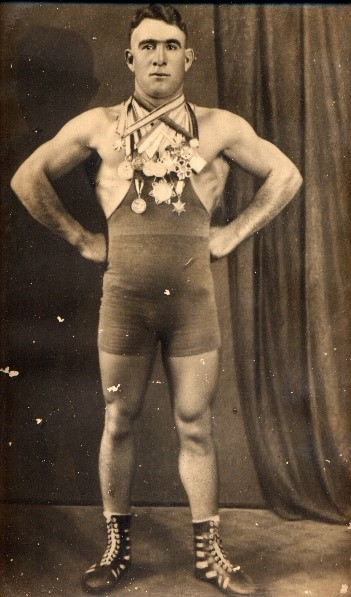
Moshe Morgenstern 1932-1933

Moshe (Moritz) Morgenstern (1906–1962) was a Jewish Greco-Roman style wrestler, active in Germany and Israel.

== Biography ==
Moshe (Moritz) Morgenstern was born in 1906 in Zawiercie in Poland. After the First World War, he and his family moved to Beuthen (today Bytom) in Upper Silesia in Poland, where he began his studies in a technical school. At the time, Upper Silesia was under a German rule.

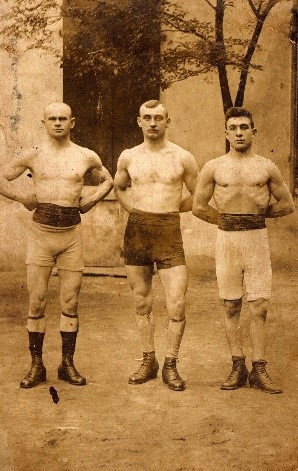
Moshe Morgenstern (right) at the beginning of his training.

At the age of 17, Morgenstern joined the Beuthen 0:6 sports club, which was established in 1891 and was a part of the German Sports Association. In the club, Morgenstern trained in Greco-Roman wrestling, and after his training period, he began participating in wrestling tournaments held between other clubs in the Half-Heavyweight class. The press reviewed these tournaments, and his victories appear in the newspapers of the period. In these tournaments, he won various medals and trophies. (At the time trophies were replicas of Greek statues of the ancient Olympian wrestlers and steel shields.)

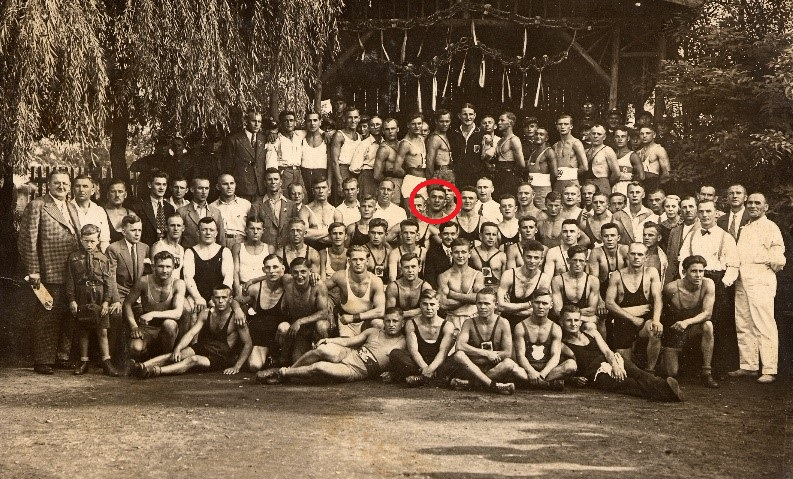
Sport Club "Beuthen 0:6".

In 1931 an all-German tournament was held to commemorate the Constitution Day, Morgenstern participated and achieved impressive accomplishments and was granted a recognition certificate, signed by hand, for his achievements from the President of the Reich, then Von Hindenburg.

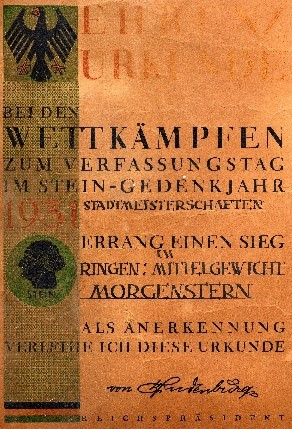
Recognition certificate from Von Hindenburg 1931.

The prime of his sports career in then Germany was a wrestling tournament in which Morgenstern had a match against the German Champion and the World Greco-Roman Champion Karl Paulini. Morgenstern lost the match by one point. A great future in wrestling was predicted for him following the match, but after the rise of the Nazis in 1933, many Jews in Upper Silesia were persecuted. Morgenstern 's name was written in the "Black List", and he had to be cautious. He was warned, so he had enough time to arrange his immigration to Israel in 1934.

=== Sports activity in Israel 1934-1962 ===
With the Nazi's rise to power, the activity of Jewish athletes in Germany was restricted.

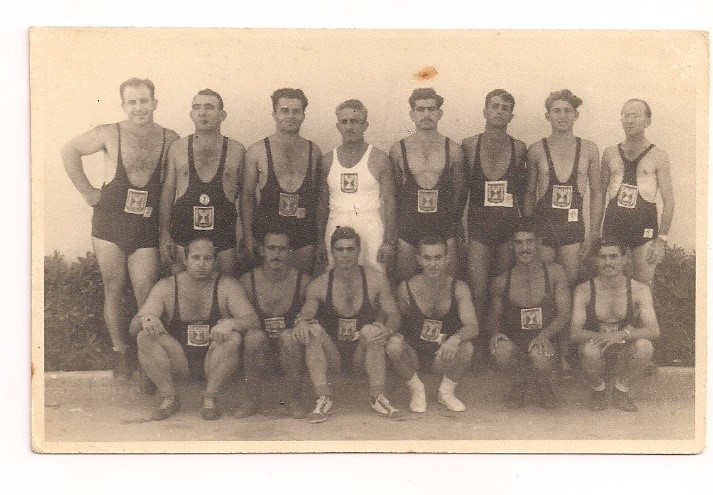
Moshe Morgenstern (top, second from the left), Israeli wrestling team.

Morgenstern, a successful Greco-Roman style wrestler in Upper-Silesia, decided to leave Germany in 1934 and immigrated to Israel with his wife and settled in Haifa.

After he found a workplace and a place to live in, Morgenstern looked for a way to return to sports. At the time, Israel, was under the rule of the British Mandate, and the number of Jews was 350,000 people compared to almost a million Arabs, and the sports activities were modest and few. Most of the sports activities were held in workplaces and the Labor Movement, under the "Hapoel" (The labor sports association), in a few means and without organized clubs and most of the activities were open-air.

In 1935, with the foundation of a sports hall in a school in Haifa, the Wrestling Division got an option to train and manage an active routine throughout the year.

In Haifa, Morgenstern met additional wrestlers from Germany, Austria, Czechoslovakia and Hungary, together they assembled a wrestling team worthy of its name in a Professional European level. The club was the only one in the country equipped and managed to high European standards.

In 1938, a new Wrestling club was established in Tel Aviv, and most of the competitions were held between the two clubs, with Morgenstern leading in all matches in the Half Heavy-weight class. Wrestling competitions were held between the Haifa Wrestling Club and the British military's Eighth Army stationed in Haifa as well.

With the beginning of the Second World War in the summer of 1939, some of the sportsmen were recruited to the British military, and the activity of the sports club went low, big tournaments were not held, and most of the activity was local. Morgenstern volunteered to be an Auxiliary Police Officer and a part of his spare time was dedicated to sports.

To encourage funding for the Red Cross' war efforts, exhibition matches and competitions were held in Tel Aviv and Haifa in which Morgenstern participated, fighting versus known local wrestlers and wrestlers from across the globe.

After the war ended in 1945, athletes came back from the military and the sports activities went high again. In 1950 the national Hapoel championship was held, in which six wrestling clubs participated. Morgenstern won the first place in the Half-Heavyweight class. The winners and the best wrestlers who participated were chosen to represent Israel in the 3rd "Maccabia" (The global Jewish Olympics). Many famous Jewish athletes from all around the world participated in the Maccabiah, from the many teams, wrestlers from the United States, Canada, Finland and Turkey stood out as great athletes. This event was Morgenstern's peak in all his sports activities in Israel, and he won the gold medal in the Half-Heavyweight class.

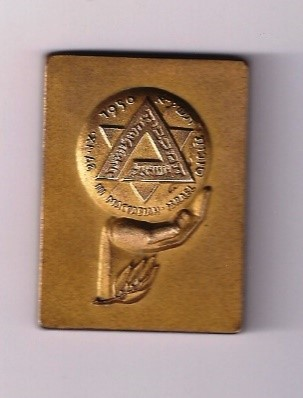
Gold medal, third Maccabia.

In 1954, Morgenstern retired from competing, and continued his activity as a referee and a coach, in the club in Haifa. At the event of the 6th Maccabia in 1961, Morgenstern was invited by the wrestling committee to participate as a referee in the ring.

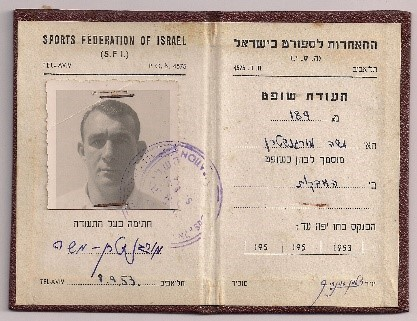
Referee certificate, 6th Maccabia.

In the midst of his many sports activities, Morgenstern received great recognition of his abilities and was nicknamed "Mr Technique". In 1962, Morgenstern died after battling cancer.

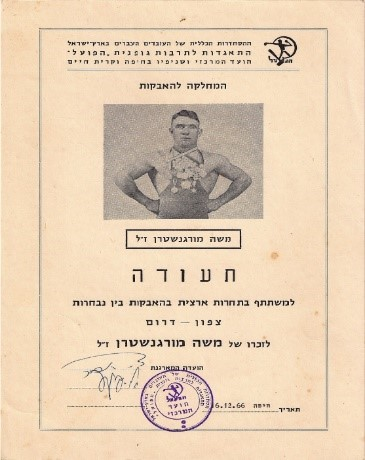
Certificate given to participants in the commemoration tournament.

== Commemoration ==
A year after Morgenstern died, the Wrestling Division in "Hapoel" association organized an annual tournament between the wrestling divisions of the many "Hapoel" clubs across the country in his commemoration. At the tournament, certificates were handed to the participators, and a wandering trophy was given to the winning club. This annual tournament was held for a number of years, and in 2004 a great ceremony was held in the Haifa Auditorium in commemoration of 80 years of the "Hapoel" Haifa association, and a book about the association was published with a wide coverage of the wrestling division which Morgenstern was one of its founders and brought great luxury to its name with his sport achievements.

In 2006, for the 100th anniversary of Morgenstern's birth, his nephew, the late Siegfried Morgenstern initiated a series of journalist coverages in Moshe's memory in the Jüdische Allgemeine and the Süddeutsche Zeitung.

In 2012, the late Siegfried Morgenstern made a memorial wall for Moshe in the "Maccabi" club in Munich, which was inaugurated in a ceremony in Hanukkah, with delegates of the Jewish Community and members of the City Council and his family participating in the event.
