= Ralf Altmeyer =

German virologist

- Born: 8 July 1966 (age 60); Saarlouis, West Germany
- Education: State University of New York at Stony Brook; Institut Pasteur, Paris; University of Tübingen
- Scientific career
- Fields: virology, influenza, SARS, infectious diseases, HIV, microbiology
- Institutions: Institut Pasteur of Shanghai; Griffith University of Australia

Ralf M. Altmeyer is a German virologist who leads the Institut Pasteur of Shanghai, a joint institute of the Chinese Academy of Sciences, Institut Pasteur and Shanghai Municipal Government, founded in 2004.

He completed his pre-doctoral studies at the State University of New York at Stony Brook, and holds a Ph. D. (1994) from Institut Pasteur in Paris, where he also completed his postdoctoral thesis on neuropathogenesis of HIV infections (1996).

His research interests including respiratory diseases, Hepatitis C, HIV, and focus on anti-infective therapeutic strategies.

During his career of fifteen years at Institut Pasteur and the Pasteur international network, Ralf Altmeyer held various management positions including the position of CEO of the HKU-Pasteur Research Centre in Hong Kong. From 2003 to 2006 Ralf Altmeyer was the architect of a successful restructuring and establishment of the organization's new strategy.

He left Institut Pasteur in 2006 to become the President of CombinatoRx-Singapore, the infectious disease subsidiary of CombinatoRx (NASDAQ:CRXX), established in 2005 in collaboration with Bio*One Capital in Singapore. Ralf Altmeyer left CombinatoRx-Singapore in summer 2009 subsequent to the acquisition of the company by Forma Therapeutics. In 2011, he founded Advance BioChina, a Shanghai-based incubator company that helps global biotech companies access the Chinese market.

Ralf Altmeyer also holds the position of adjunct professor at Griffith University of Australia, Institute of Glycomics.
