= Saarlouis =

- Town
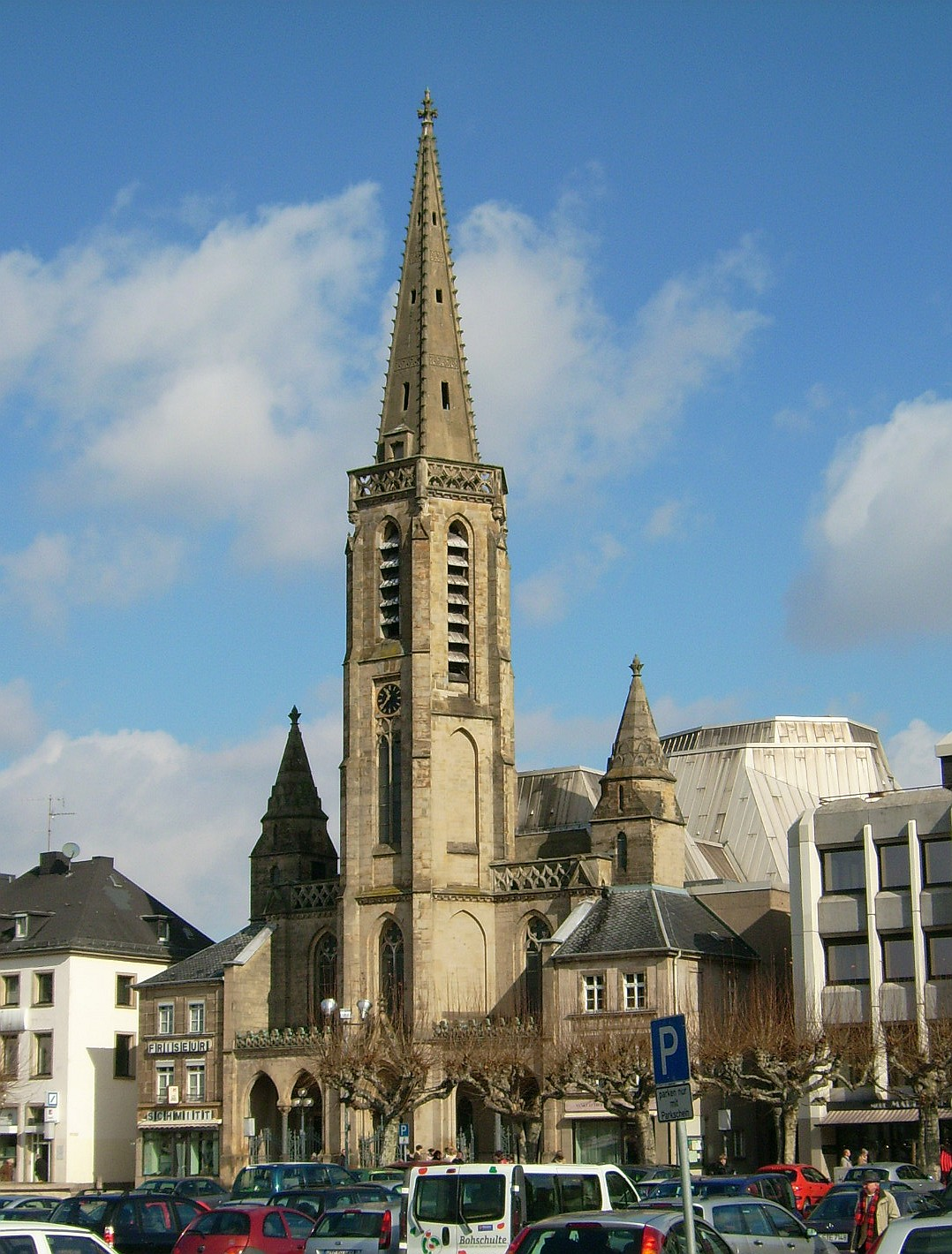
- The Ludwigskirche (Saint Louis Church)

- Flag Coat of arms

- Location of Saarlouis within Saarlouis district
- Interactive map of Saarlouis
- Location within Germany Location within Saarland
- Coordinates: 49°19′N 6°45′E
- Country: Germany
- State: Saarland
- District: Saarlouis
- Subdivisions: 8

Government
  - Mayor (2017–27): Peter Demmer (SPD)

Area
  - Total: 43.3 km^{2} (16.7 sq mi)
- Elevation: 181 m (594 ft)

Population (2025-12-31)
  - Total: 37,675
  - Density: 870/km^{2} (2,250/sq mi)
- Time zone: UTC+01:00 (CET)
  - Summer (DST): UTC+02:00 (CEST)
- Postal codes: 66740
- Dialling codes: 06831
- Vehicle registration: SLS
- Website: www.saarlouis.de

Saarlouis (German: [zaːɐ̯ˈlʊɪ̯]; French: Sarrelouis, [saʁlwi]; formerly Sarre-Libre and Saarlautern) is a town in the state of Saarland, in western Germany, located on the banks of the Saar river. With a population of over 37,000 (2024), it is the fifth-largest city of Saarland and serves as an important regional center. Saarlouis lies near the border with France and Luxembourg. The town functions as the administrative seat of the district of Saarlouis and is part of the cross-border SaarLorLux Euroregion.

Saarlouis was founded in 1680 by order of Louis XIV of France as a fortress town designed by the military engineer Vauban. The stronghold was intended to secure France’s new frontier after the Treaty of Nijmegen. The star-shaped fortifications gave the city its characteristic layout, parts of which remain visible today. Saarlouis became part of Prussia following the Treaty of Paris of 1815.

In the 20th century, Saarlouis shared the turbulent history of the Saar region, which changed hands multiple times due to its strategic and economic importance. Following the Treaty of Versailles, the town became part of the Territory of the Saar Basin administered by the League of Nations, before rejoining Germany in 1935 after a plebiscite. After World War II, Saarlouis was again included in the French-occupied Saar protectorate before the Saar Treaty of 1956 paved the way for its return to Germany in 1957.

Today, Saarlouis is a regional centre of commerce, culture, and industry. It is known for its French-inspired urban layout, historic fortifications, and cultural events such as the annual “Emmes” town festival. Its location close to France and Luxembourg makes it a key part of the SaarLorLux region.

== History ==
Historical affiliations

Kingdom of France 1680–1792
French Republic 1792–1804
French Empire 1804–1815
Kingdom of Prussia 1815–1871
German Empire 1871–1918
Territory of the Saar Basin 1920–1935
Nazi Germany 1935–1945
French occupation zone 1945–1947
Saar Protectorate (France) 1947–1956
West Germany 1957–1990
Germany 1990–present

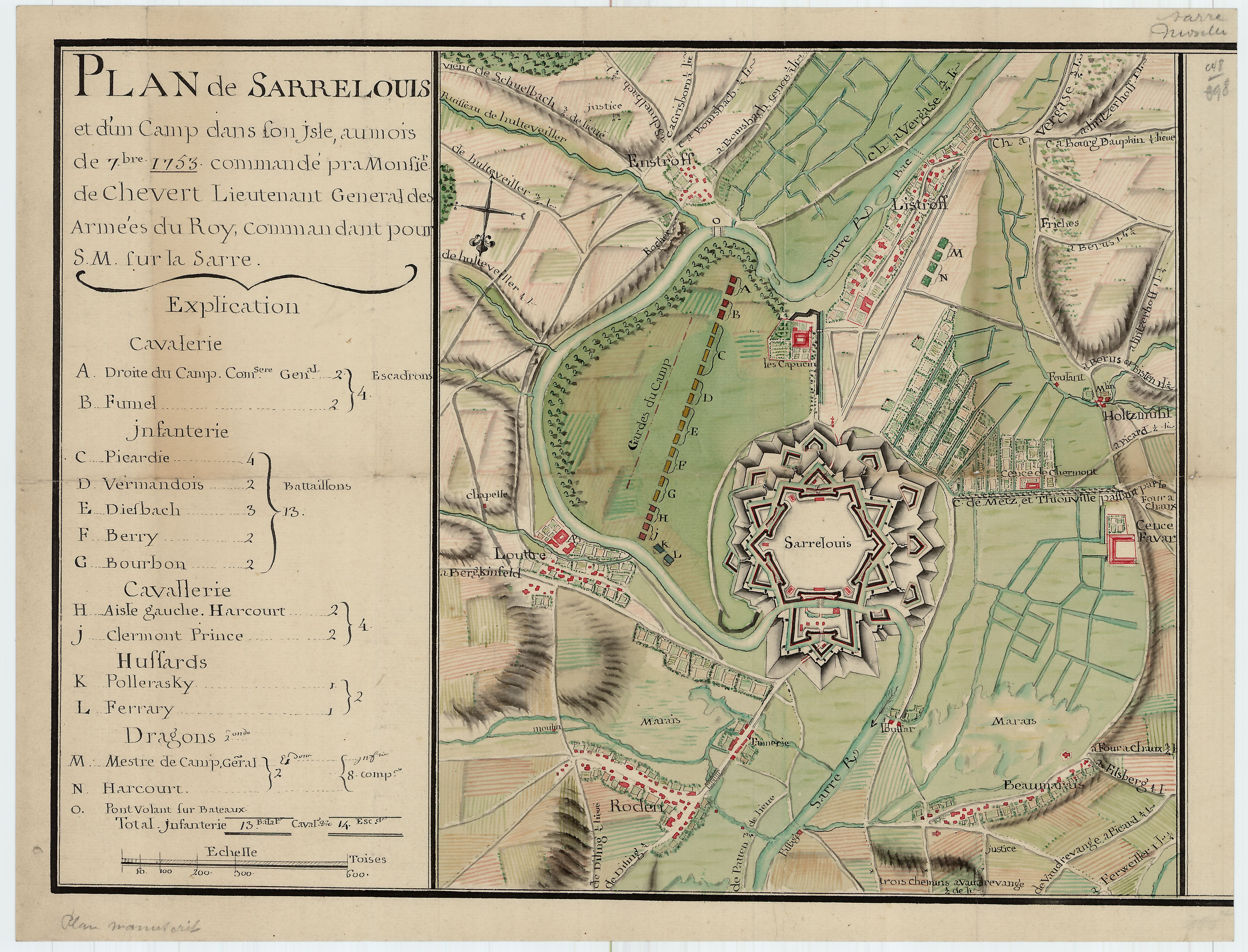
Fortress of Saarlouis with staging area 1753

With the Treaties of Peace of Nijmegen in 1678/79, Lorraine fell to France. In 1680, Louis XIV of France gave orders to build a fortification (to defend the new French eastern frontier) on the banks of the river Saar which was called Sarre-Louis. Notable French military engineer, Sébastien Le Prestre de Vauban, constructed the town, which would serve as the capital of the Province de la Sarre. The plans were made by Thomas de Choisy, the town's first Gouvenour. In 1683, Louis XIV visited the fortress and granted arms. The coat of arms shows the rising sun and three Fleur-de-lis. The heraldic motto is Dissipat Atque Fovet: He (the Sun) dispels (the clouds) and heats (the earth).

In 1697, the Treaty of Ryswick made most parts of Lorraine independent again, but Saarlouis and the surrounding areas remained a French exclave. During the French Revolution, the town was renamed Sarre-Libre, but it returned to its original name in 1810. With the Treaty of Paris in 1815, Saarlouis (and the whole region later known as the Saargebiet) became Prussian.

Marshal Michel Ney, who was born in Saarlouis, was arrested and tried for treason after the failure of Napoleon I's Waterloo Campaign. Ney's attorney tried to use the Prussian annexation to save his client's life, arguing that Ney was no longer a French citizen and therefore exempt from the court's jurisdiction. Ney refused to cooperate, declaring himself to be French, and so was convicted and later executed.

After World War I, French troops occupied Saarlouis. The Saargebiet became a protectorate of the League of Nations for 15 years. In 1933, a considerable number of anti-Nazi Germans fled to the Saar, as it was the only part of Germany left outside the Third Reich's control. As a result, anti-Nazi groups campaigned heavily for the Saarland to remain under control of League of Nations as long as Adolf Hitler ruled Germany. However, long-held sentiments against France remained entrenched, and very few sympathized openly with France. When the 15-year-term was over, a plebiscite was held in the territory on 13 January 1935: 90.3% of those voting wished to rejoin Germany.

From 1936 till 1945, Saarlouis was named as Saarlautern (-lautern being a common ending of town and village names in Germany) in an attempt by the Nazis to Germanise the town name.

After World War II, the region (then called the Saarland), was again occupied by France. In a plebiscite in 1955, most of the people in the Saarland opted for the reunification with the Federal Republic of Germany, and on 1 January 1957, it became the 10th federal state of West Germany.

In 1980, Saarlouis celebrated its 300th anniversary.

== Incorporated districts ==
Over time, the following districts have been incorporated into Saarlouis:

- Beaumarais (1936)
- Fraulautern (1936)
- Lisdorf (1936)
- Neuforweiler (1970)
- Picard (1936)
- Roden (1907)
- Steinrausch (1972)

== Fortifications ==
Even today, the fortress dominates the town's hexagonal floor plan. Beside the buildings made by Vauban, there are also some constructions left from the 19th century when the Prussians got control over the town. After 1887, some parts of the fortress were slighted, but many buildings and places, e.g. the casemates, some barracks and the Great Market with the Commander's Office and the Vauban island, a former ravelin with a memorial for Michel Ney can still be seen today.

== Economy and infrastructure ==
Saarlouis was famous for its nearby steel and iron ore production and its nearby mining facilities. Today, the Ford Motor Company's Saarlouis Body & Assembly is the town's largest employer, producing the Ford Focus. The plant in the Roederberg suburb opened in 1970, but in 2022 is threatened with closure when the Ford Focus production cycle runs out in 2025.

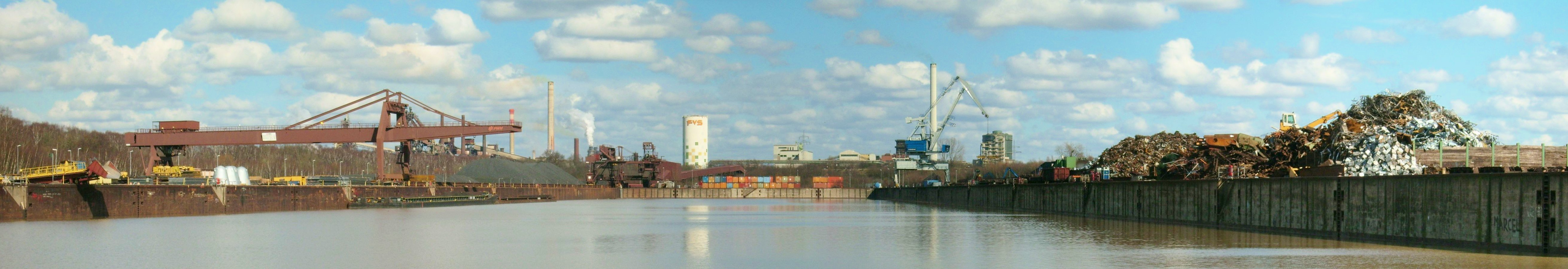
Inland Port Saarlouis/Roden

The industrial port in Saarlouis-Roden is Germany's 13th largest inland port. Saarlouis is also a manufacturer of chocolate.

== Politics ==
Saarlouis is part of the Saarlouis (electoral district) in the Bundestag, represented by Peter Altmaier.

== Transport ==
Saarlouis has a station on the Saar railway that provides hourly connections to Saarbrücken and Trier.

It is connected to Saarbrücken by the A 620 and with Luxembourg by the A 8.

== Twin towns – sister cities ==
Saarlouis is twinned with:

- Saint-Nazaire, France (1969)
- Eisenhüttenstadt, Germany (1986; the first West and East German town twinning)
- Matiguás, Nicaragua (1986)
- Favara, Italy (2025)

== Notable people ==
- Michel Ney (1769–1815), Marshal of France
- Heinrich Marx (1777–1838), lawyer and father of Karl Marx
- Martin de Bervanger (1795–1865), priest
- Charles-Nicolas Peaucellier (1832–1913), general and inventor of the Peaucellier–Lipkin linkage
- Eduard von Knorr (1840–1920), admiral of the Imperial German Navy and chief of the East Asia Squadrons
- Paul Emil von Lettow-Vorbeck (1870–1964), colonial general and politician
- Karl Marx (1887-1966), German journalist
- Alois Spaniol (1904–1959), Nazi Party leader of the Saar
- Esther Béjarano (1924–2021), survivor of the Women's Orchestra of Auschwitz
- Oskar Lafontaine (born 1943), politician (SPD, The Left)
- Rainer Rupp (born 1945), spy
- Dagmar Heib (born 1963), politician
- Ralf Altmeyer (born 1966), virologist
- Heiko Maas (born 1966), politician (SPD)
- Gabriel Clemens (born 1983), darts player

== Gallery ==
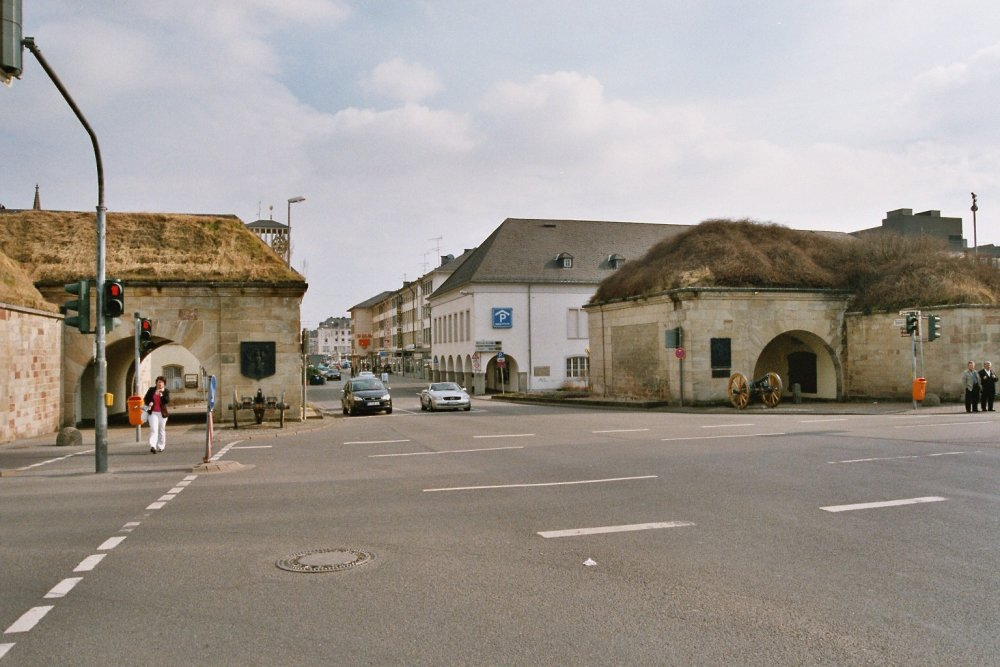
The Deutsches Tor (German Gate)

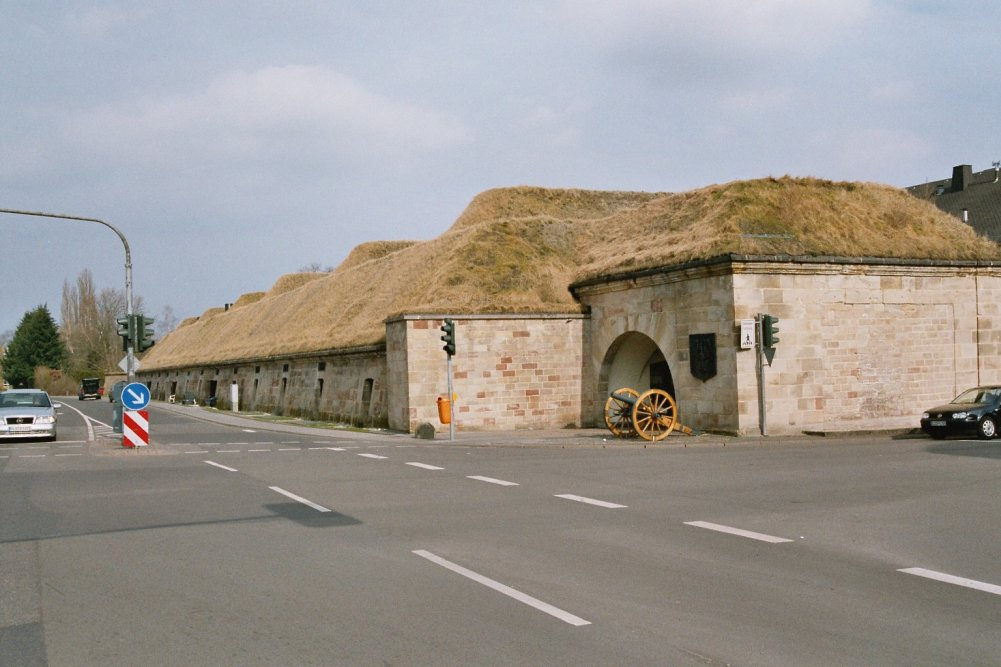
The Kasematten (The Casemates)

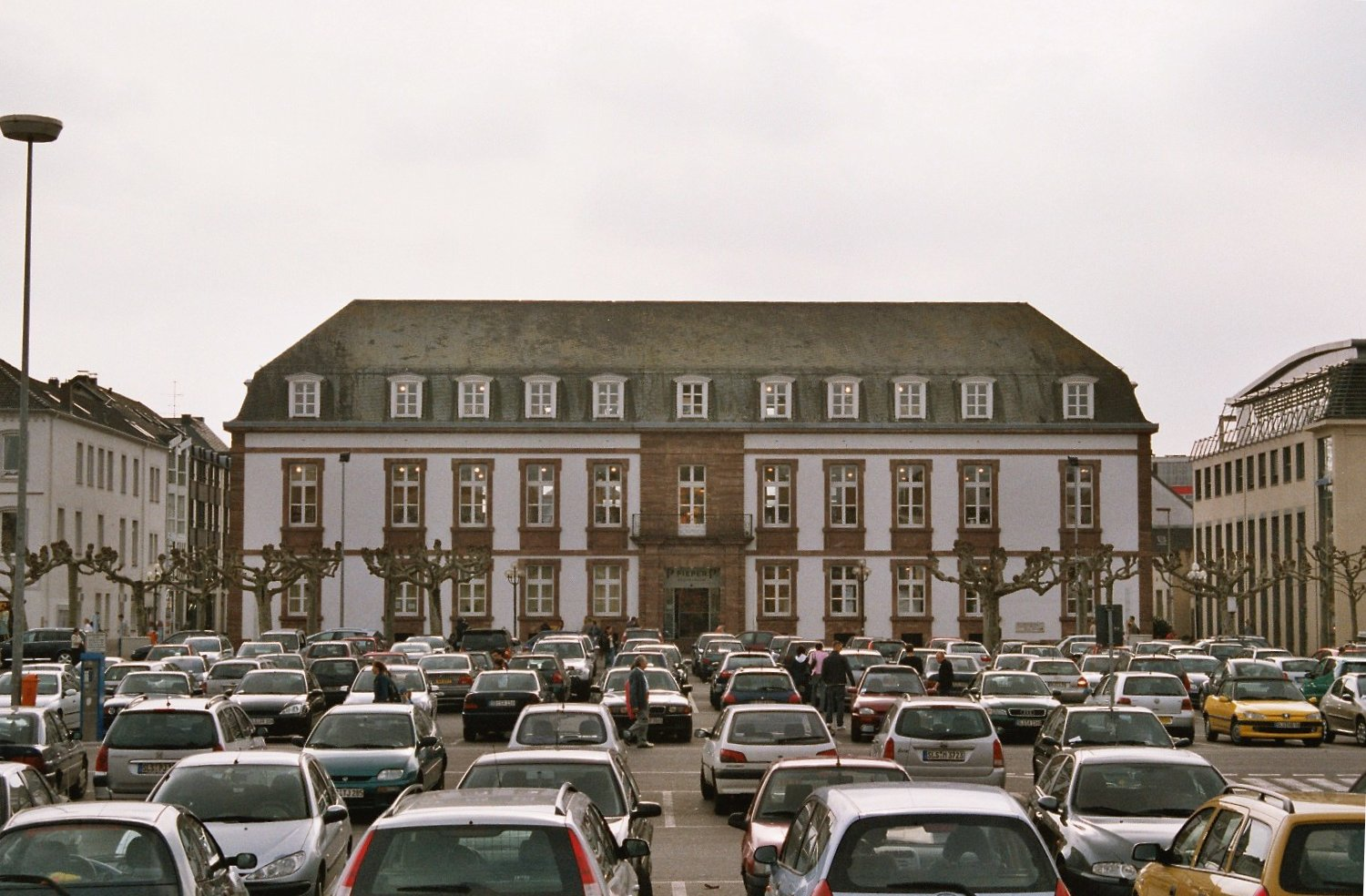
The Commander's Office and the Großer Markt (Great Market)

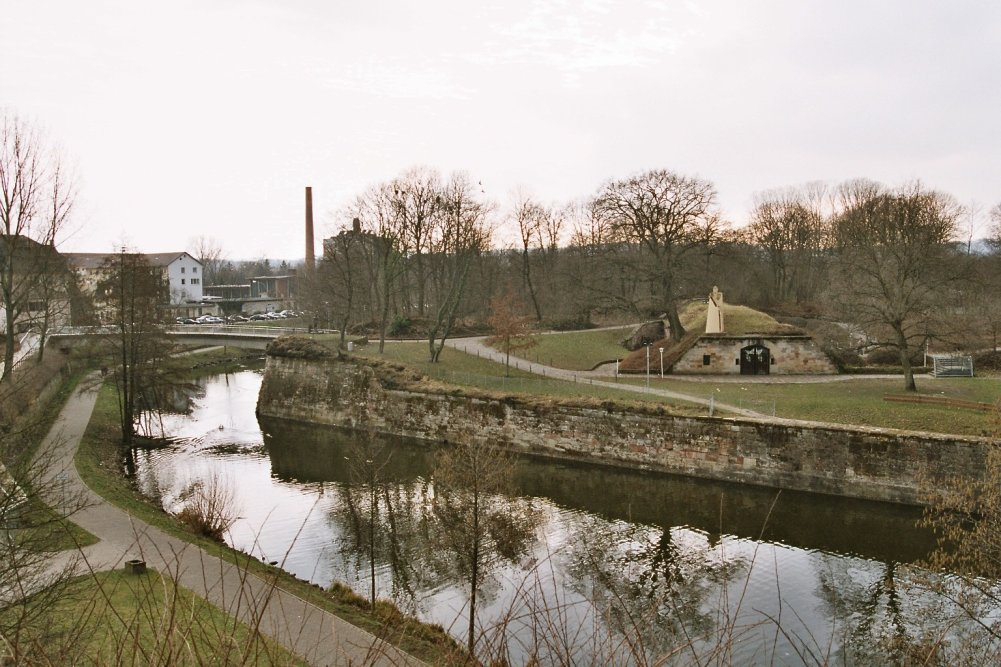
The Vauban Island and the memorial of Michel Ney

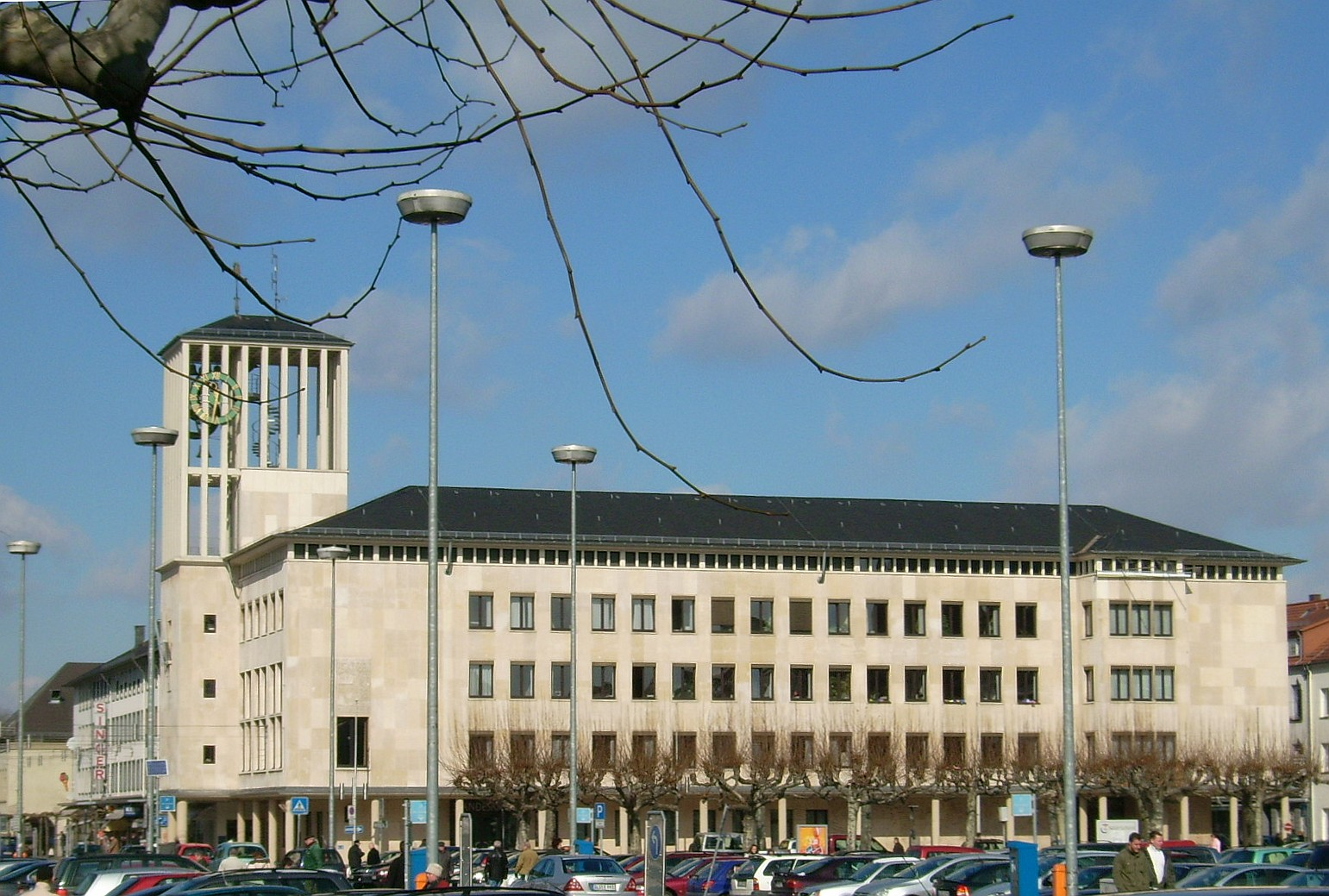
The town hall

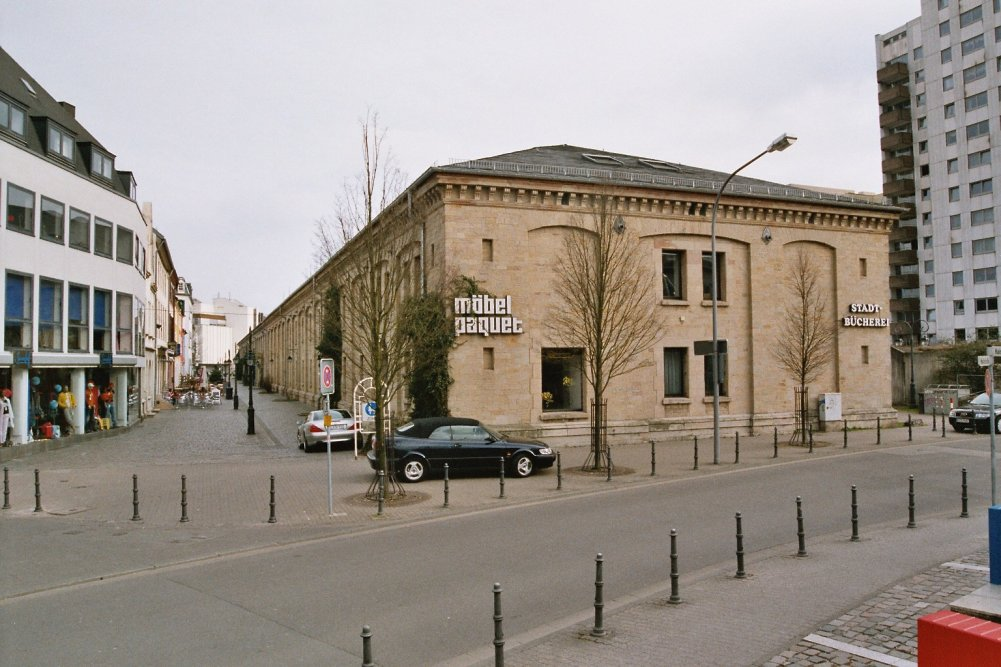
The Kaserne No. VI (Barracks No. VI, now home of a museum and a public library)

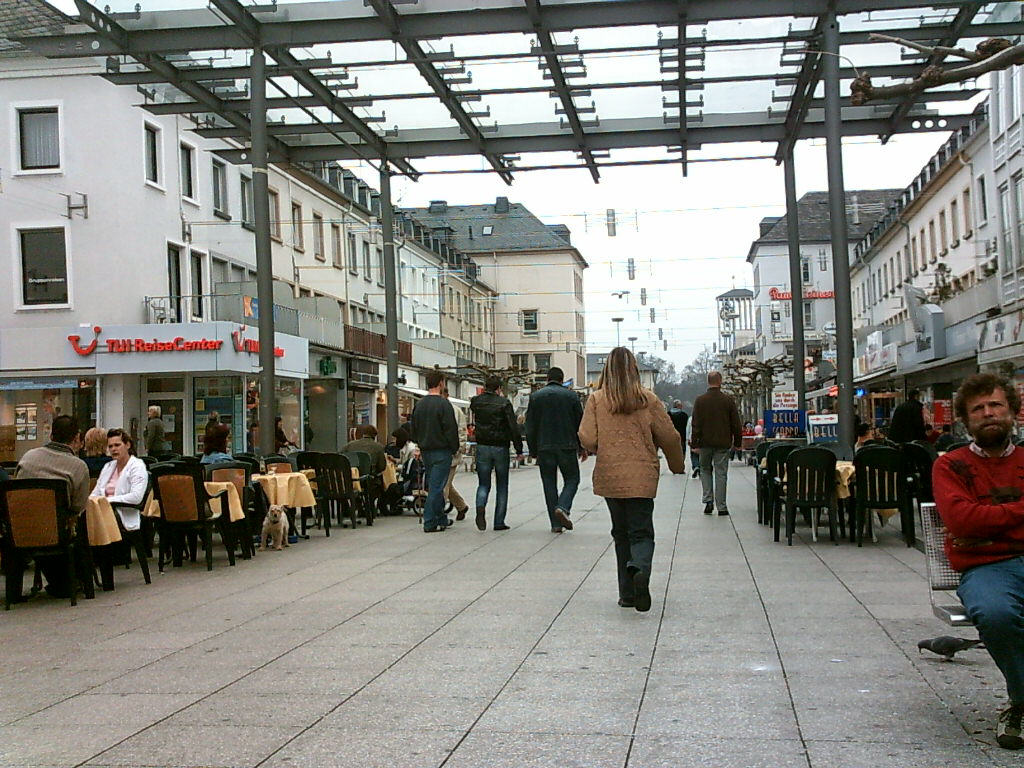
The Französische Straße (French Street), now a pedestrian zone

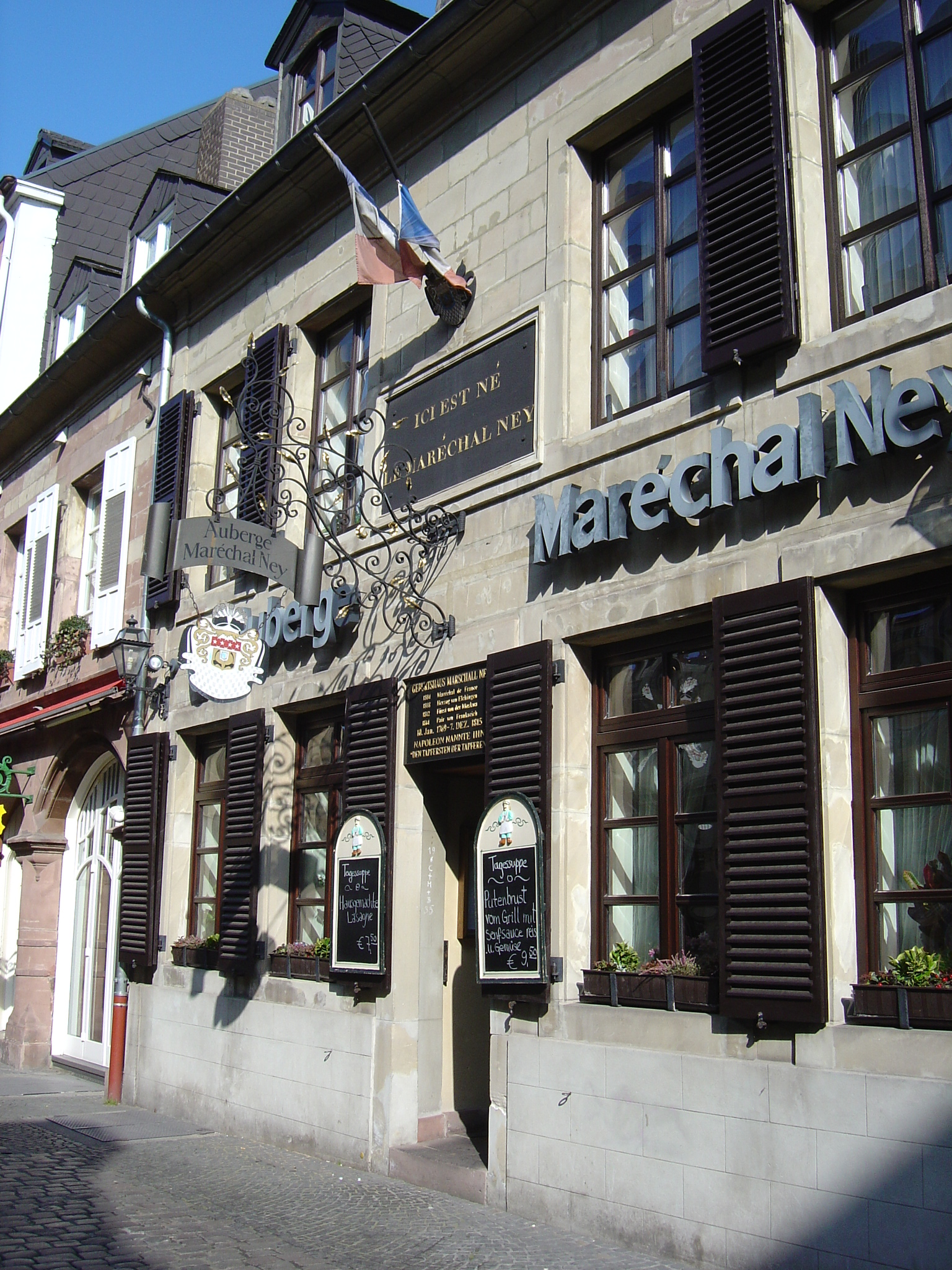
Birthplace of Michel Ney, now a French Restaurant

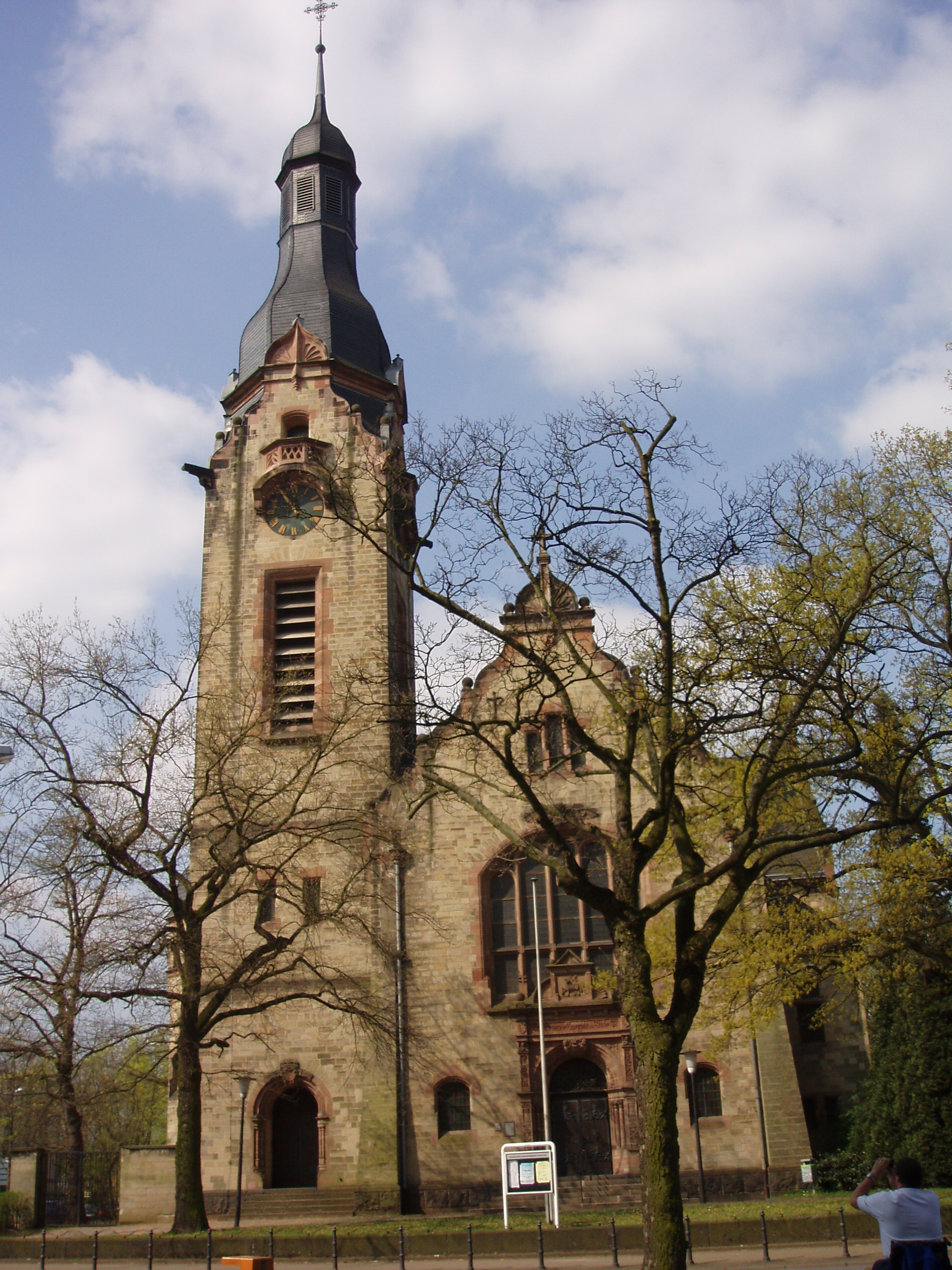
The Protestant church

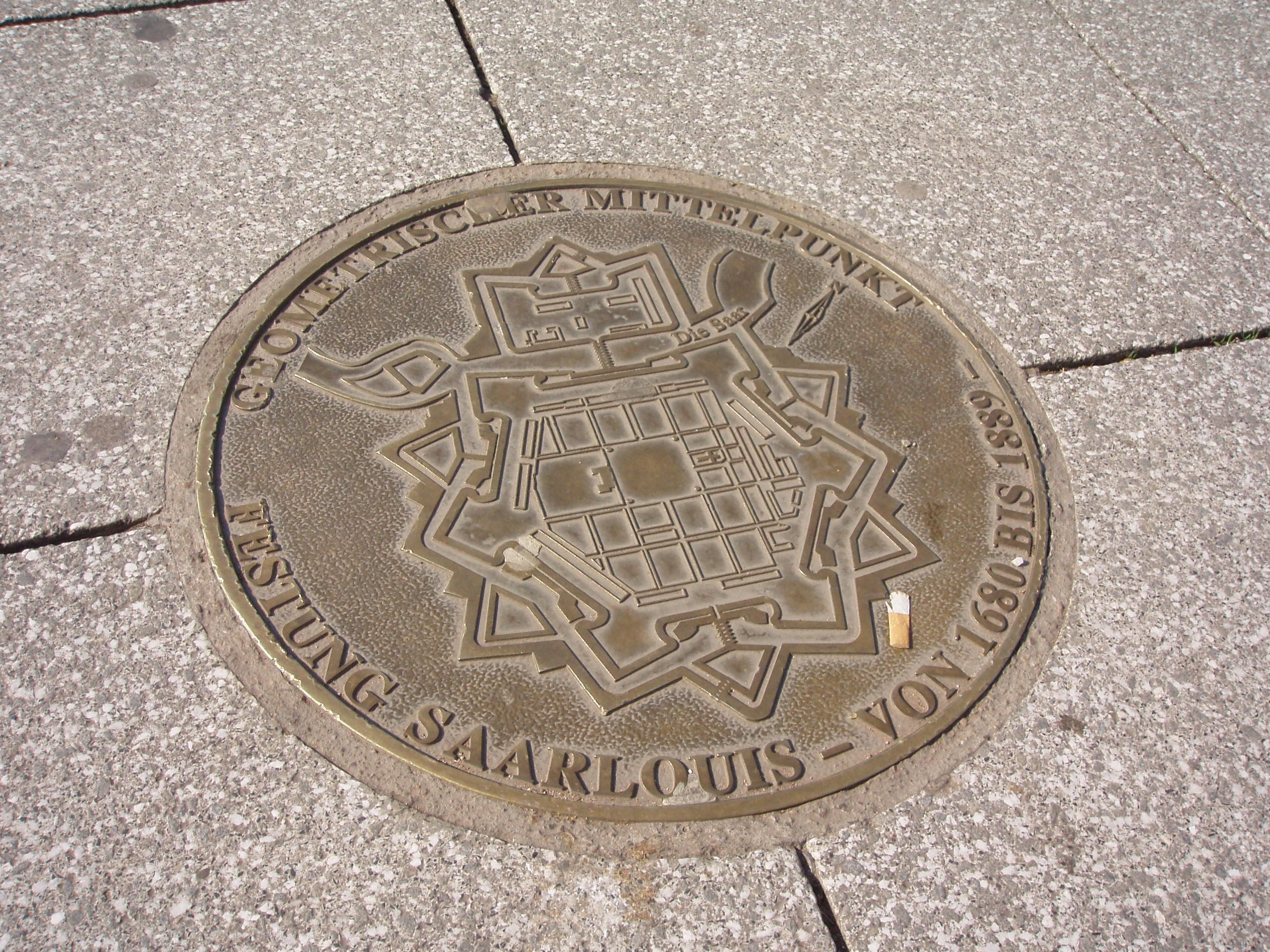
The geographic centre

== See also ==
- List of places named after people
