= Province de la Sarre =

French administrative unit

The Province de la Sarre (Province of the Saar) was a French administrative unit during the reign of King Louis XIV encompassing the area of the present Saarland and beyond. The Province de la Sarre existed from after the Peace of Nijmegen in 1680 until the Peace of Ryswick in 1697. At the time of its founding 26 cities and 1600 villages belonged to the newly founded Province, which had its capital at Saarlouis.

With the Peace of Ryswick that ended the Nine Years' War, the territories that made up the Province had to be given back to the Holy Roman Empire and the Duchy of Lorraine was reinstated in the form it had previously existed in 1670. Thanks to the intervention of England, France was permitted to retain the fortified cities of Saarlouis and Landau in order to secure its borders. As a result, Saarlouis would remain a French exclave until the French Revolution.
