= Martin de Bervanger =

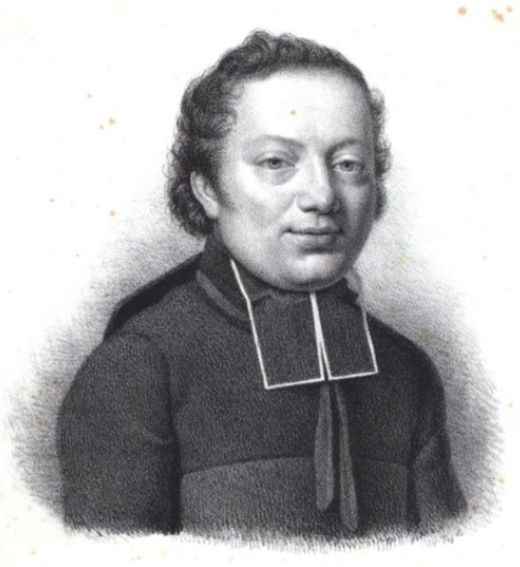

Martin de Bervanger (May 15, 1795 – 1865) was a French priest, founder of charitable institutions including the Parisian Institution Saint-Nicolas. He was born in Sarrelouis, and died in Paris.

== Life ==
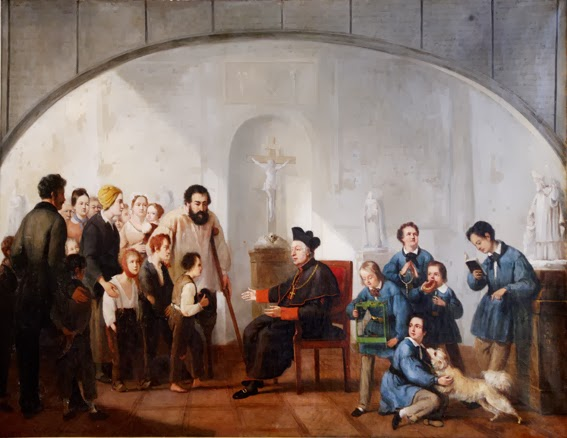

After being for some time assistant pastor in his native city, he took part, in 1822, in the foundation of the Association Royale de Saint-Joseph, and later of the Œuvre de Saint-Henri. These two institutions were destined to give to workingmen free instruction and professional training. To reach this end more effectively, he founded, in 1827, a boarding-school where, besides manual training, poor boys could receive intellectual, religious, and moral education. This is the Œuvre de Saint-Nicolas.

In the beginning only seven children were in the establishment, but it soon developed and was transferred from its poor quarters in the Faubourg Saint-Marceau, to a better location in the Rue de Vaugirard. At the time of the July Revolution, the first two institutions disappeared, but the Institution Saint-Nicolas remained. It had many difficulties to overcome; the resources were insufficient; proper instructors could not always be found; suspicions of political intrigues were entertained by the Government, which led to various vexatious inquiries. De Bervanger succeeded in overcoming all obstacles, and the institution became more and more prosperous. Soon a branch establishment was founded at Issy.

In 1859, De Bervanger turned over the institution to François-Nicholas-Madeleine Morlot, Archbishop of Paris, who gave the direction of it to the Christian Brothers. It has since been enlarged. De Bervanger wrote the Règle de l'Œuvre de Saint Nicolas (1853).
