= Karl Marx (journalist) =

German journalist (born 1887)

- Born: 9 May 1897; Saarlouis, Germany
- Died: 15 December 1966 (aged 69); Ebersteinburg, Germany
- Occupation: Journalist
- Spouse: Lilli

Karl Marx (May 9, 1887 – December 15, 1966) was a German journalist in the Weimar Republic. Going into exile during the Nazi era, Marx returned to Germany in 1945 after the Holocaust and became one of the founders of the post-Holocaust Jewish press in Germany.

== Early life ==
Born to a Jewish family in Saarlouis on May 9, 1897. Marx was named after the political theorist Karl Marx.

Marx served in the German army during World War I.

== Career ==
Marx worked as a freelance journalist in the Weimar Republic, leaving Germany in 1933. Crossing into the British occupation zone in Germany in 1945, Marx wrote "How can I possibly, after all that has happened, live in Germany as a Jew?" Along with a few thousand other Jews, Marx was among the first German Jews to return to Germany after the Holocaust.

In 1946, Marx founded the Jüdische Allgemeine, a Jewish newspaper published in Berlin.

In 1953, Marx was presented with the Grand Service Cross of the West German Republic by Karl Arnold, Minister-President of North Rhine-Westphalia, in honor of Marx's work promoting understanding between the German people and the State of Israel and the Jewish people.

In 1961, during the Eichmann trial, Marx expressed concern that the trial would reopen old wounds and increase antisemitism within German society. Marx cited antisemitic incidents in West Germany in 1959 and 1960 as evidence of antisemitism among Germans.

In 1966, when Kurt Georg Kiesinger became Chancellor of West Germany, the international press expressed shock that a man with a Nazi past could became Chancellor. Jüdische Allgemeine supported Kiesinger and Kiesinger referred critics to his relationship with the newspaper's editor by saying, "Ask my friend Karl Marx".

== Death ==
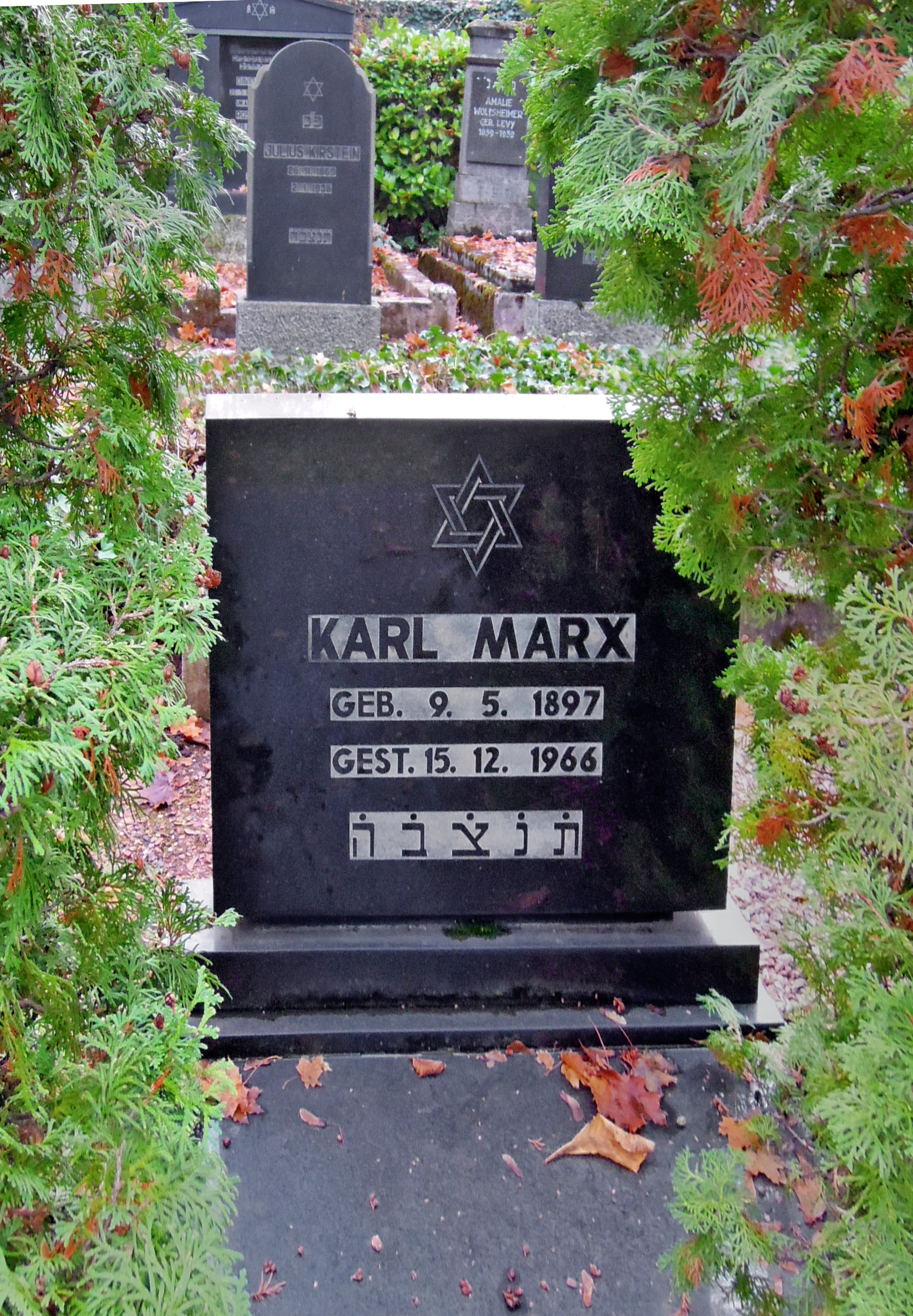
Gravestone of Karl Marx in the Jüdischer Friedhof in Saarlouis, November 2011.

Marx died at the age of 69 at a hospital in Ebersteinburg on December 15, 1966, following a lengthy illness. During his illness he received well wishes from President Heinrich Lübke and upon his death his widow received condolences from Vice-President Willy Brandt. Following his death, his widow Lilli Behrendt assumed ownership of the Jüdische Allgemeine.

== See also ==
- History of German journalism
