= Roy Zu-Arets =

Roy Zu-Arets רועי זו-ארץ
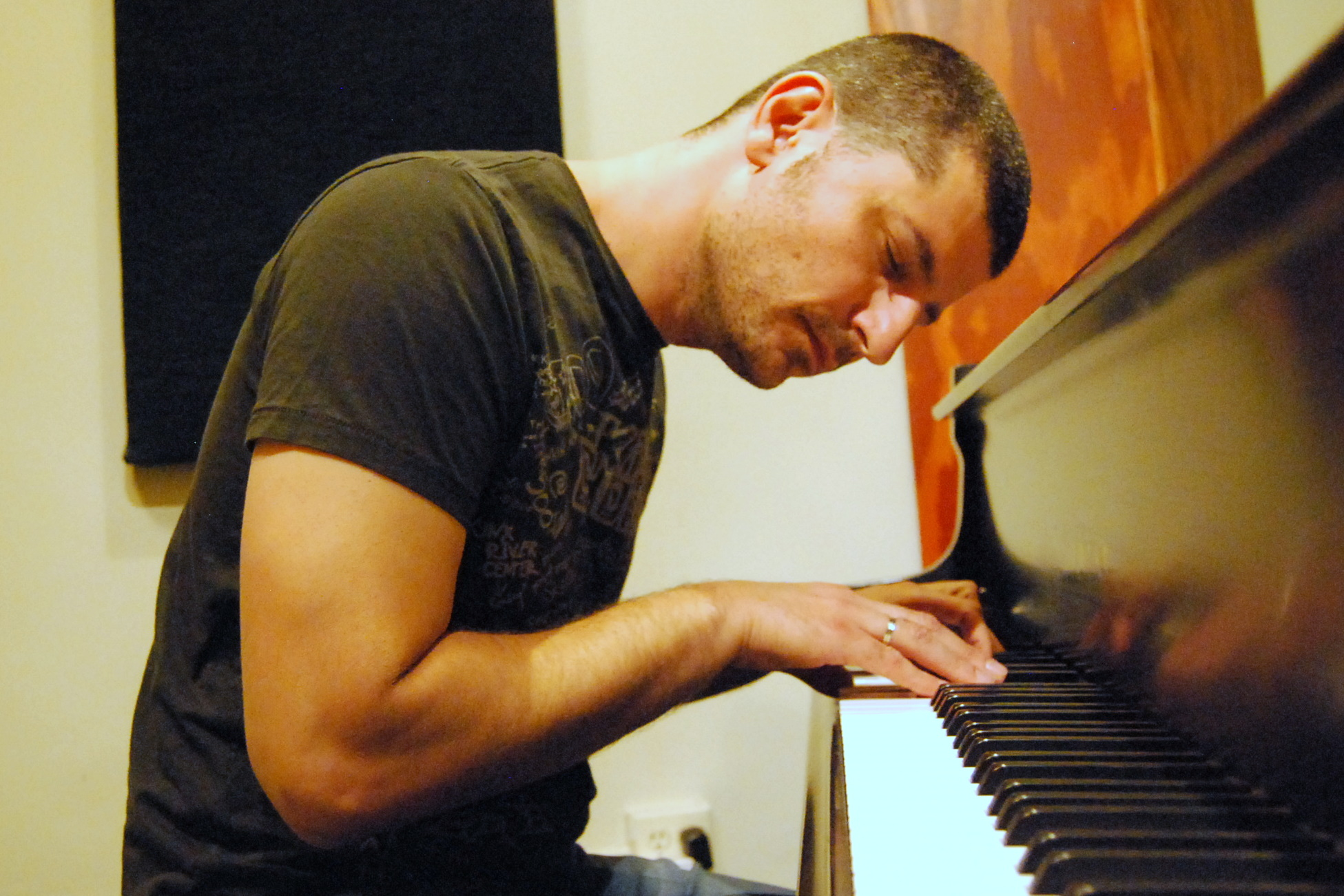
- Roy Zu-Arets plays the piano in his studio in Hollywood

Background information
- Born: January 22, 1969 (age 57)
- Origin: Tel Aviv, Israel
- Genres: Contemporary Music} Pop
- Occupations: Music Producer, Composer, Pianist, Arranger, Backing Vocalist
- Instrument: Piano
- Years active: 1980–present
- Label: Decrescendo Productions
- Website: https://royzworld.com/

Roy Zu-Arets (Hebrew: רועי זו-ארץ; born January 22, 1969) is an American-Israeli composer, pianist, music producer, and arranger.

== Biography ==
Roy Zu-Arets grew up in Tel Aviv, Israel, to a Ladino-speaking family of Sephardic Jewish of Libyan-Jewish, Turkish-Jewish, and Greek-Jewish descent. His younger brother is Guy Zu-Aretz. He was classically trained from the age of 3, and between the ages 5 and 18 he studied at the Israeli Music Conservatory in Tel Aviv. Zu-Arets developed an interest in contemporary classical music, pop, and rock in his teens and released his first album at 12 years old.

During the early 1990s, Zu-Arets scored music for various Israeli TV series, theater productions, and movies. He also played with and produced music for many Israeli musicians including Rita, Danny Sanderson, Uzi Hitman, Meir Banai, and HaYehudim.

In the late 1990s Zu-Arets moved to New York and studied music composition and theory at Juilliard School and later at Mannes College. In addition to his academic studies, Zu-Arets wrote music for theater and recorded with various artists including Taking Back Sunday and Omar Hakim.

In 2007 Zu-Arets played as a keyboardist in the Kaveret U.S. tour.

In 2009 Zu-Arets scored the music for the movie MacHEADS, released three albums, and started documenting his composition process and publishing it to his YouTube channel.

He now lives in Los Angeles.

== Discography ==
- Snowflakes - Piano Holiday Classics (2009)
- Confessions of a Composer (2009)
- Emanuel (2009)
- New York Analogue Ensemble (2004)
- Roy Zu-Arets (1980)

== Compositions ==
=== Chamber music ===
- The Zrazuvian Colour, a piece calling for a marimba and four cellos. Premiered at The 12th Jerusalem International Chamber Music Festival in September 2009 and performed by Asaf Roth, Frans Helmerson, Nicolas Altstaedt, Kyril Zlotnikov and Zvi Plesser.

=== Music for film ===
- MacHEADS (2009)
- 1906 (2007)
- Connecting Dots (2003)

=== Music for theatre ===
- One Hundred Gates, Jewish Theater of New York off-Broadway production featuring Elliott Gould
- The American Jew, Jewish Theater of New York off-Broadway production
- Bridges and Harmonies, off-Broadway production
- In the Realm of Chelm, Juilliard School of Drama (2004)

== Other recorded appearances ==
- Where You Want to Be by Taking Back Sunday (2004) - piano, keyboard, string arrangement, conducting
- The Wandering Tune by Meir Banai (1996) - piano, keyboard
- Metziut Nifredet by HaYehudim (1995) - music production, piano
- Mithch Tochi by Uzi Hitman (1993) - piano, arrangement
