= Jewish Theater of New York =

The Jewish Theater of New York is a theatre company founded in 1994, with the production of One Hundred Gates by playwright/director Tuvia Tenenbom.

As of 2003, The Jewish Theater of New York is the only English-speaking Jewish theatre company in New York state.

The Theater normally presents between one and two new shows a year in New York City. As of 2001, its productions are also mounted yearly in Europe (link). Starting 2013, the Jewish Theater combines action and word in a program it calls, Redefining Theater Through Literature, uniting stage and literature, acting and books, into one unit.

The Theater, avant-garde and experimental at times, has been highly acclaimed by local and international critics. Some of its shows, such as Father of the Angels, Love Letters to Adolf Hitler, Diary of Adolf Eichmann, The Suicide Bomber, Love in Great Neck, The Last Virgin, Last Jew in Europe and others, have been written about in much of the Western press (link) and are also studied in universities.

The Jewish Theater of New York was founded by Tuvia Tenenbom, a former Haredi.
