= Guy Zu-Aretz =

Israeli actor, singer and TV star

- גיא זוארץ
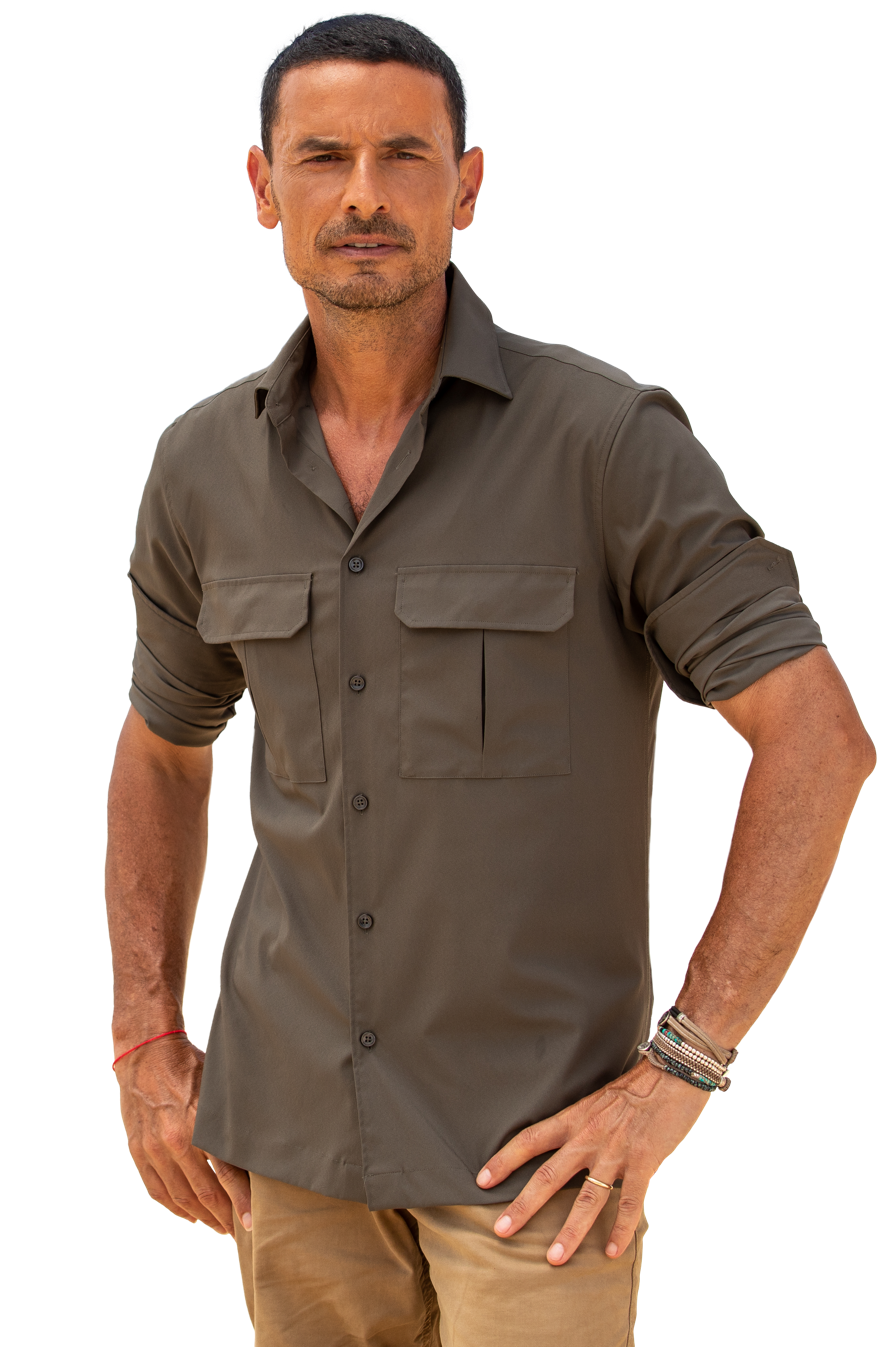
- Born: Guy Yaakov Zu-Aretz; 21 March 1973 (age 53); Tel Aviv, Israel
- Spouse: Yael Bar Zohar (m. 2005)
- Children: 3

Guy Yaakov Zu-Aretz (or Zoaretz, Suarez, Hebrew: גיא זוארץ; 21 March 1973) is an Israeli television host, actor, musician, and director.

== Early life ==
Zu-Aretz was born in Tel Aviv, Israel, to a Ladino-speaking family of Sephardic Jewish people of Libyan-Jewish, Turkish-Jewish, and Greek-Jewish descent. His older brother is Roy Zu-Arets.

In 1996, following his military service in the Israeli Air Force Band, Zu-Aretz began studying acting at the Hillel Ne'eman school and acting in front of the camera with Ruth Deichs. Among other things, he studied voice.

== Career ==
=== Career in theater ===
Zu-Aretz participated in several plays, mostly for Habima, Israel's national theatre, including: Bustan Sephardi, Garden Ricky, The Diary of Anne Frank, Butterflies Are Free, Not Because of the Memories, Little Tel Aviv, A View from the Bridge, Go All Out and the musicals The Band Returns and Mary Lou. In 2006, he participated in the musical Guys and Dolls at Beit Lessin Theatre.

In 2007, he won an award from the Shalem Foundation, in appreciation of his theater work with disabled people in Acco.

In Hanukkah 2010 he played in the musical The Little Mermaid next to Rinat Gabay. In 2012 he started acting in the musical "Flower of the neighborhoods"("Perach Hashchunot") at the Be'er Sheva theatre beside Liraz Charhi. The musical was written by Kobi Oz, and directed by Nir Erez. In Hanukkah 2013 he played in the Musical "Snow White and the Hunter" with Tal Mosseri, Yael Bar Zohar and more.

=== Career in television and film ===
In 1997, Zu-Aretz participated in the soap opera Ramat Aviv Gimmel. In 1999, he participated in Gang Bulldozer. In 2002, Zu-Aretz played in the drama series Rhythm of the Beat, and that same year he also played in the drama "Intensive Care", which was broadcast on Channel 2.

In 2003, he played in the Israeli film Passion Fruit Waltz. In 2004–2005 he participated in the telenovela Our Song. In 2005 he played in Steven Spielberg's film Munich. In 2006, he was a host for The Good Life Magazine.

In 2007, he became the host of Israel's version of the show Survivor. Originally broadcast on Israel's Channel 10, later moved to Channel 2.

In 2012 Guy starred as "Ari" in the youth series Galis, a spin-off of the series The Dreamers, broadcast on HOT. Starting in May 2012, he is the host of Israel's version of Dancing With the Stars.

In 2023, Zu-Aretz hosted the International Bible Contest.

=== Musical career ===
In 2012, he premiered the album Ladino and prayers from home, in which he and his brother, Roy Zu-Aretz, performed Ladino songs and romances, along with Jewish prayers from their Sephardic heritage.

The two have been touring Israel with the live show, produced by Eli Grunfeld, ever since. They have performed in festivals, Jewish holiday celebrations and venues across the country. In 2014, they celebrated their 100th show.

In March 2014, he released his second album, also in the Sephardic Ladino tradition, Casa Zu-Aretz.

In his live shows, he has collaborated with musicians including David D'Or and Galit Giat.

== Personal life ==
In September 2005, he married Israeli model and actress Yael Bar Zohar; they have three children and reside in Ramat Hasharon.

He does Kiddush on Shabbat, attends a synagogue with his children, and uses tefillin.

On October 7th 2023, Zu-Aretz's nephew was murdered in the Hamas terror attack at the Re'im music festival massacre.
