= Hannes Stein =

German journalist and author (born 1965)

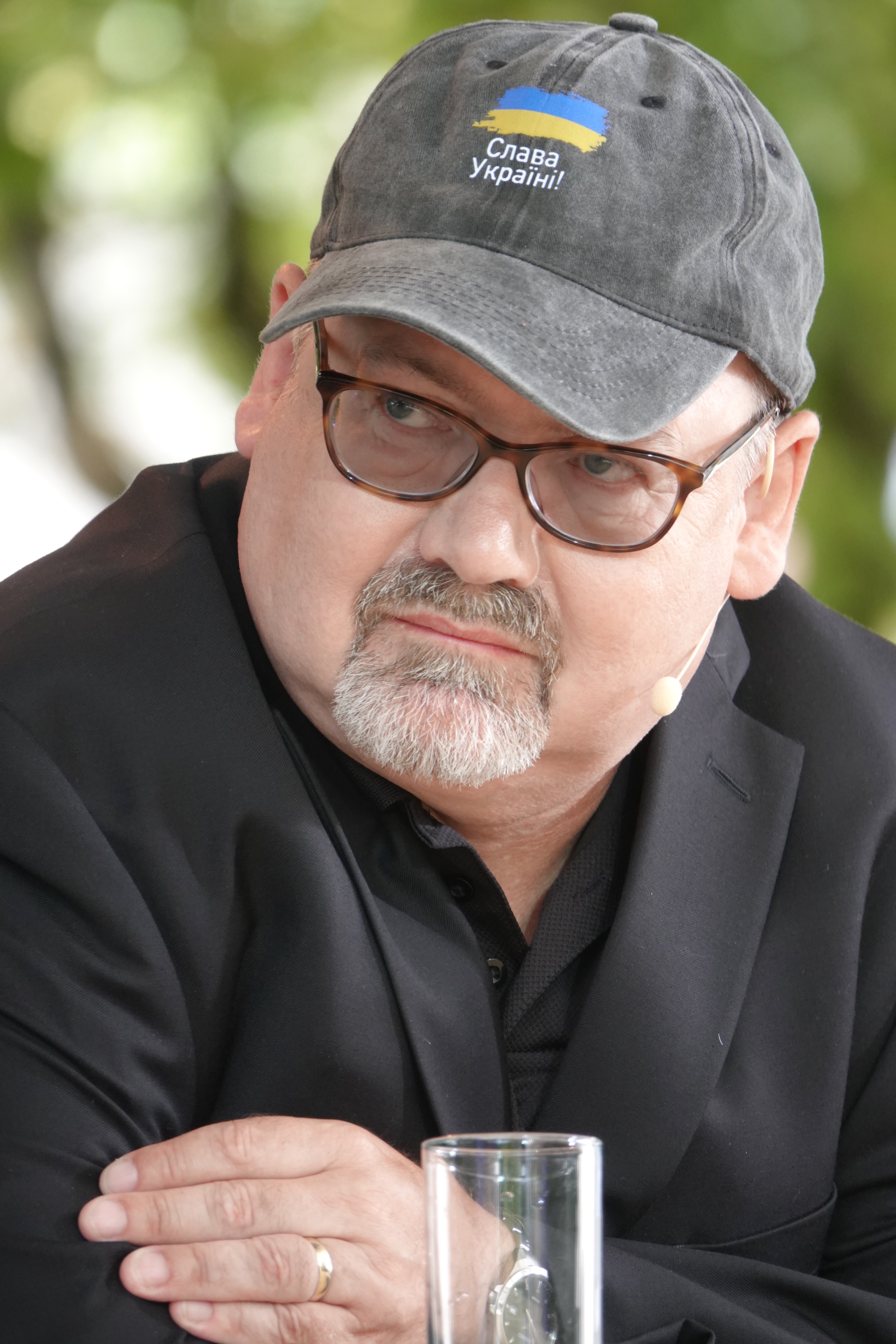
- Born: February 15, 1965 (age 61); Munich
- Occupations: Journalist and Author

Hannes Stein (born 1965 in Munich) is a German journalist and author. He worked for several major German newspapers such as the FAZ, the Berliner Zeitung and Die Welt. Other works include articles for Der Spiegel and First Things.

Several of his books are published, and describe sociopolitical themes in a rather humorous style.

== Early life and education ==
Stein was born in Munich, Germany, but grew up and attended school in Salzburg, Austria. In 1984 he moved to Hamburg, Germany, in order to study English and American culture as well as philosophy, and completed his Magister in 1989. He then moved to Scotland for the following year in order to be a German teacher there.

== Journalism ==
In 1990, Stein started working for the feuilleton of the FAZ where he published essays and critiques. In the years from 1995 to 1997, Stein worked for the German news magazine Der Spiegel. He lived in Jerusalem, Israel, from 1997 to 1999 where he worked as culture correspondent for the Berliner Zeitung and wrote essays, reports and interviews. In 1999, Stein moved to Cologne to become a literary editor of the Rheinischer Merkur, where he also worked for the radio station DeutschlandRadio. Stein returned to Hamburg in 2000 and became the feuilleton editor of Die Welt, but soon moved to Berlin in 2001 to become the editor of the Literarische Welt. Among others, Stein's works were also published in Merkur, Kursbuch, the lettre, Die Weltwoche and First Things. In 2007, Stein emigrated to the United States. He continues writing for Die Welt and "Die Welt am Sonntag" from New York City, where he now lives.

== Literature ==
List of published books (in chronological order):

- Endzeit-Propheten oder die Offensive der Antiwestler (1995, Rohwolt, Reinbek)
- Moses und die Offenbarung der Demokratie (1998, Rohwolt, Berlin)
- Endlich Nichtdenker! Handbuch für den überforderten Intellektuellen (2004, Eichborn)
- Enzyklopädie der Alltagsqualen Ein Trostbuch für den geplagten Zeitgenossen (2006, Eichborn Berlin)
- Immer Recht haben! Der endgültige Ratgeber (2008, Eichborn Berlin)
- Der Komet (2013, Galiani, Berlin)
