= Jüdische Allgemeine =

German Jewish weekly newspaper

- Type: Weekly newspaper
- Publisher: Central Council of Jews in Germany
- Editor: Philipp Peyman Engel
- Founded: 1946
- Language: German
- Headquarters: Berlin
- ISSN: 1618-9698
- Website: www.juedische-allgemeine.de

The Jüdische Allgemeine is a German Jewish weekly newspaper published in Berlin by the Central Council of Jews in Germany. It was founded in 1946 as the Jüdisches Gemeindeblatt für die Nord-Rheinprovinz und Westfalen, published by journalist Karl Marx. According to historian Michael Brenner, the Allgemeine was considered a barometer of the rebuilding of Jewish life in postwar Germany.

As of 2010, the budget was provided in around equal amounts by the council, subscriptions and advertising, and its editor estimated that half its readers were not Jewish. Deutsche Welle called the Allgemeine the Central Council's official organ. Editor-in-chief Christian Böhme, in charge since 2005, left in 2011 after disagreeing with the Central Council about bringing the paper into its structures, amid fears it would become a Verbandspostille (house organ). After the Hamas attack on Israel in October 2023, the paper worked on Shabbat for the first time in its history. In 2026, the Deutscher Presserat (the "German Press Agency") reprimanded it for a commentary on the killing of Palestinian journalist Anas Al-Sharif.
