= Michael Behagen =

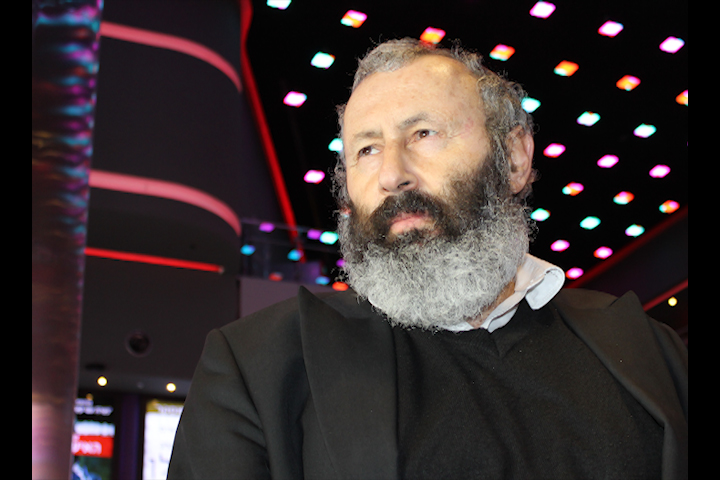

Michael Behagen (Hebrew: מייקל בהגן; born 1952) is an Israeli film director, writer and musician. Behagen was born in 1952 and currently lives in Oregon, Illinois. His most distinguished work so far is considered to be Late Night Stories, a thriller TV series that he wrote and directed. It was aired in Israel in the late 1980s.

== Early work ==
Michael Behagen made his first short film The Wind, about the Suez Canal, where he was doing his military service. In 1980, still a student, Michael Behagen wrote and directed Shapiro's Song and won an Ophir Award for the best Israel film director. In 1981, he then graduated from the Tel Aviv University Film department.

== Film career ==
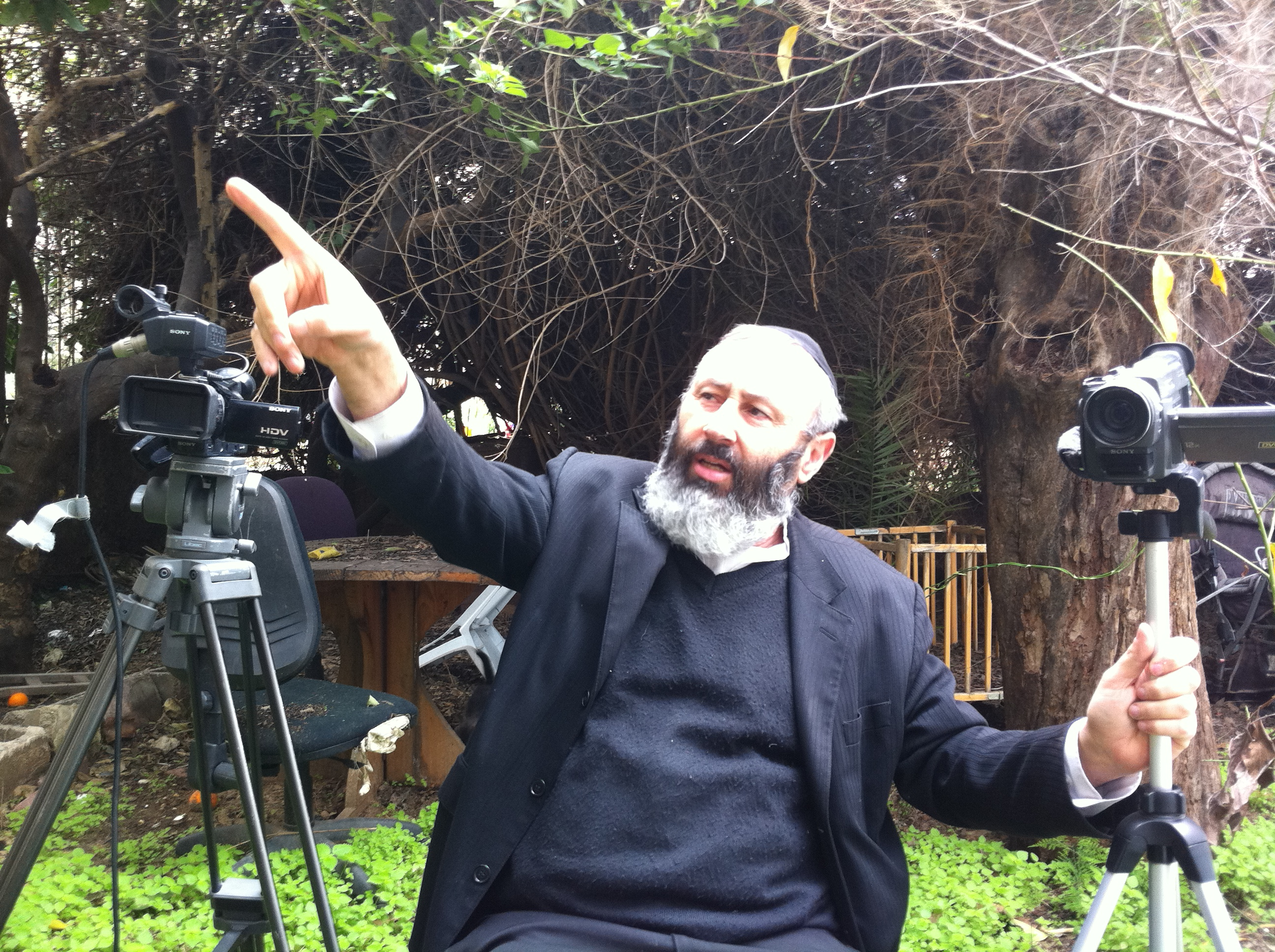

In 1986, he directed his first feature film, The Plumber. It is a satirical comedy that tells the story of a plumber who, through a comedy of errors, becomes the Minister of Finance. Surprisingly, he does a better job than the politicians who preceded him.

In 1997 Michael Behagen wrote and directed his 2nd feature film Forever Young, based on the true story of a deadly desert crash that ended four young people's lives. A videotape was found in the crashed vehicle. It included astonishing footage of the last moments of the 4 young men. This terrible accident inflamed Israel so much that people demanded a retelling of the story to understand how it could have happened.

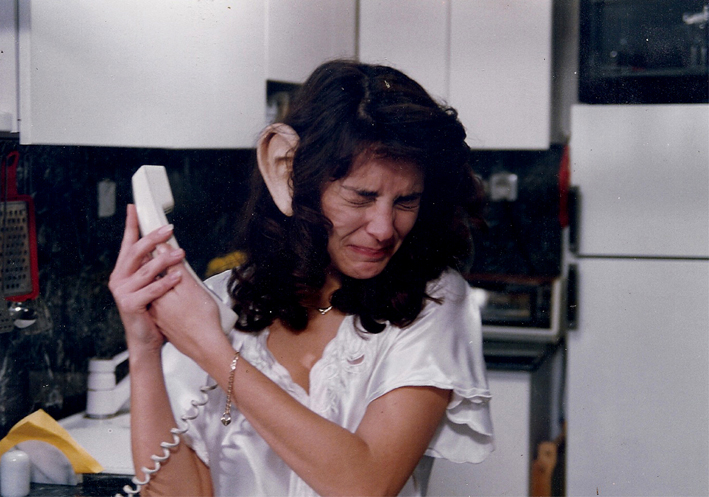
From Late Night Stories episode "The Earring"

== Late Night Stories ==
In 1987, Michael Behagen wrote and directed The Cuckoo Clock, the pilot of the Late Night Stories TV series. It took the Israeli TV another year to approve the series. At that time, most Israeli TV movies produced by IBA, the only channel at that time, dealt only with Israeli identity topics. He came up with a series that dealt with intimate fears. Late Night Stories is a TV thriller series of 13 films written, directed, produced and composed by Behagen between 1987 and 1991 and aired in Israel between 1988 and 1991. The English version of the series aired in Germany and Russia.

In "The Cookoo Clock" A young woman awakens on a fateful morning. A crucial meeting is due to take place at the advertising agency where she works. She cannot miss it. Unfortunately she finds herself locked in her twelfth floor apartment in a newly built building. She did ask her husband to lock the door but now she can't find her key.

In "Puppet Show" Nicole is running a traveling puppet show. She keeps all her equipment in an old van. When the van breaks down on an isolated road, she seeks the assistance of an eccentric garagist. Rafael knows this is a simple problem but prefers to complicate matters, encouraging Nicole to spend the night at his remote spot.

In "The Replacement" Alex, an infamously unfaithful dentist, is told by his wife, a sculptor, that she has terminal cancer and only few months to live. Oddly enough Rivi is hardly upset by her impending death but seems obsessed by the guilt of leaving Alex alone. Before long, Rivi presents her husband with a beautiful young model. A bizarre romance flames, with Rivi acting the part of the matchmaker. Suddenly Rivi regrets her action, wondering whether the new-found lovers will continue to bow to her whims. In "Line Up", Yossef Berger comes to the police station complaining that his car was towed from a legal parking space. A policeman asks him a small favor: They're missing one man for a line-up. Berger agrees, but he's in a hurry to get to work. A prominent foreign investor is coming to his brokerage house this morning. During the line-up two witnesses identify Berger as the perpetrator of a murder. Berger discovers that the victim is the foreign investor who arrived earlier than scheduled without informing anyone. Worse than this, Berger had apparently very good reasons to want him dead.

In "The Earring", Ossi, a stunning model, wakes one morning to discover that her ear has grown to abnormal proportions. She sees her doctor who sends her to specialists who ultimately confirm the fact that her ear is indeed growing. Frustrated by the professionals' inability to help, she follows a crazy hunch of her own. She tracks down the old lady who tried to sell her earrings the day before. Ossi learns the hard way that there is more to aesthetics than modern medicine dares to explore. In "David's Lucky Day", David works as an usher. His work is to come into houses of people who could not pay their debts and take their belongings. One day he discovers in 2 different places 2 parts, the head and the body of a very rare and expensive statue. He just needs few hundred bucks to buy it from the man who owns the head. The man who owns the other part is willing to give it to him free because it brought him bad luck. David goes to a Casino boat. He's got only 10 dollars in his pocket, but he does not worry. Nothing can stop him. It is his lucky day.

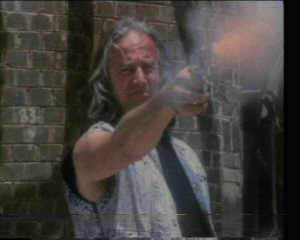
Nathan Zehavi in Late Night Stories episode "Certain Death"

In "Certain Death", Sander needs an urgent operation to replace his liver, but he does not have the 70,000 dollars necessary for the operation. Tom, a regular customer in Sander's unsuccessful nightclub has just found out that he is very ill and has decided to sell his apartment for 70,000 dollars wishing to end his life as short and as good as he can. Sander realizes that this may be his chance.

In "The Babysitter" Kitty is a young girl looking for a job. She notices an ad in a grocery shop, someone is looking for a babysitter. She goes to the interview. "I have to tell you that my little girl is lovely but for one thing," says the mother, "she is a pyromaniac. She needs to lit fire to everything she sees." Kitty is eager to get the job. Not only does she promise the mother that she does not smoke, but she is also tearing the ad out, so that no one will stand in her way.

In "The Accident", Roni comes to a party with his new girlfriend Debby and with his new Opel Corvet his brother has left him. A young and pretty girl approaches and asks him to take her for a short ride in his car. Unwillingly, Debby agrees to this arrangement. The short ride turns out to be a long and surprising one. In "You love money, don't you?" A wealthy, portly guest checks into a luxury hotel and displays keen interest in a young waitress. He offers her a proposal she can't refuse: A meeting in the lobby for $1,500. She will just have to dress and look completely different.
In "The Housekeeper" Claire is waiting for the housekeeper, but surprisingly she does not come. Some young man comes instead and tells her that Debby is ill and that he has come to replace her. He shows Claire a letter and seems to know everything about the house so that Claire does not have any reason to suspect that something is wrong.

In "Etiquette" Claire is the editor of an etiquette column of a major daily newspaper, but in her own married life she is a crude beast. One night, together with her husband they steal flowers from a cemetery, not wishing to arrive empty-handed at the home of a colleague. It emerges that one has to be much more cautious in dealing with the dead.
In "Blind Date" Benny and Annette meet on a blind date in the romantic atmosphere of a nice café. Annette finds Benny so charming that she invites him to come over. However, when Benny stands up to leave with her, she discovers that the man who has just promised her an unforgettable evening, has a severe physical problem. How can she get out of this unpleasant situation?

Late Night Stories reached an average of 42% rating despite airing late at night. It won praises from critics, and Michael Behagen was nicknamed "The Israeli Hitchcock". Michael Behagen wrote and directed the whole series of 13 episodes. Late Night Stories was distributed worldwide and aired in many countries.

In 2020, he released the feature The Forest. The film follows a family arriving at a forest to film a series about the Baal Shem Tov, while cutting down its trees. Mizmor, the daughter, devastated by the ruined forest, develops a close relationship with a chopped tree, leading her parents to believe she has lost her mind.

In 2023, Behagen released the film "Work from Home". The film follows a young woman living in an isolated house with her grandfather. She chooses to work from home for a large company, believing that staying at home will offer her more protection from external threats. However, she soon learns that the saying "My home is my fortress" can sometimes prove misleading The premiere of the film took place at the Tel Aviv Cinematheque in April 2023

== 2000–2024 ==
In 2000, Michael Behagen published his first book, in Hebrew, Lullaby.

In 2004, Michael Behagen began filming The Letter, a documentary film. It is actually the story of Michael Behagen himself who documented the process his family had been going through.

In 2020 Behagen initiated "ayas", an app for a real-time mutual watching in TV with friends.

In 2023, Behagen published his book The Partisan's Daughter. The novel is set during World War II and follows Machale, a Jewish girl who was given to a Polish family in an attempt to save her from the Nazis. When the Polish family tries to get rid of her, she is rescued by Magda, a devout Polish woman who risks her life to save her. Magda adopts Machale as her daughter, and they flee together to Warsaw. After the war, Aaron, Machale's father, returns from the horrors of war and manages to find her. The emotional reunion between the father who survived the Holocaust, the daughter who matured over four years, and the woman who saved her, leads Aaron to make a decision that will irrevocably shatter and upend the lives of all three.

In 2012 the DVD set of Late night stories distributed by "Hatav Hashmini", included the audio CD "late Night Music", composed by Behagen, arranged and perform by him and by Tal Yaniv.

In 2013, Behagen released an audio CD Jewish Good Night, featuring Hasidic Nigunim arranged and performed by Behagen.
