= Efrat Abramov =

Israeli TV announcer & screenwriter

- אפרת אברמוב
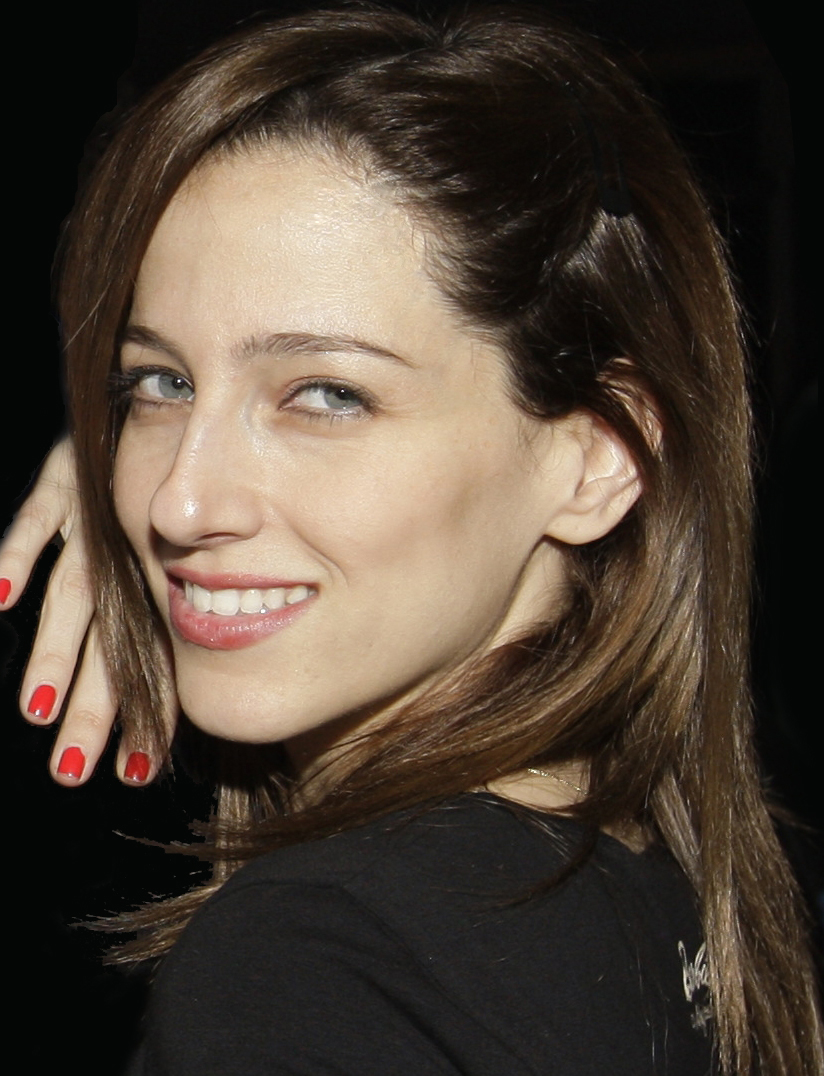
- Born: March 3, 1980
- Occupations: TV presenter, journalist, screenwriter
- Employer(s): Bip (former), Globes (since 2008)
- Known for: Hosting "Mahadoora Mugbelet" and "The Little Sister"

Efrat Abramov (Hebrew: אפרת אברמוב; born March 3, 1980) is an Israeli TV presenter, journalist and screenwriter.

Residing in Tel Aviv, Israel, to a family of Jewish background. Abramov was the host of the daily Bip comedy channel show "Mahadoora Mugbelet" (English: "Limited Edition"). Then she was selected to write and host the TV aftershow "The little sister" (Hebrew: האחות הקטנה) – a satire late night that followed the events of "HaAh HaGadol" (The Big Brother)" show in Israel. Abramov hosted the show for 3 seasons (150 episodes) that dealt with seasons 1, 2 and the first VIP season. The show received the highest rating of any show in the channel's history, and was a candidate for an Israeli Television Academy award in 2009. The show terminated due to the closure of Bip channel in the end of 2010.

Since 2008 Abramov is a columnist in the Israeli newspaper Globes.
