= Erez Da Drezner =

Israeli model (born 1978)

- ארז דה דרזנר
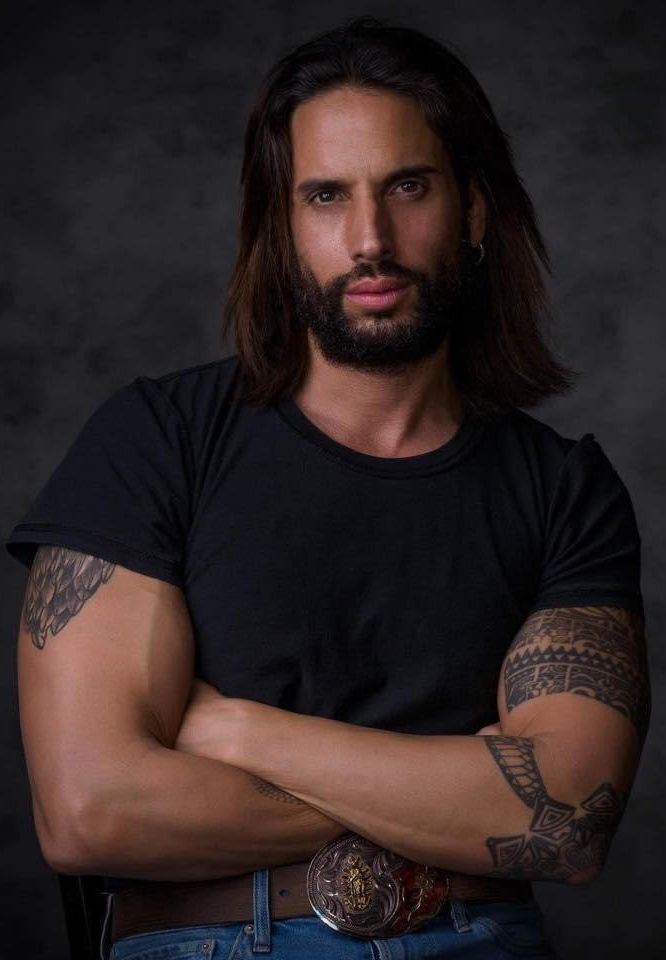
- Erez Da Drezner in 2021
- Born: August 1, 1978 (age 48); Haifa, Israel
- Education: WIZO school
- Occupation: Model
- Years active: 2008–present
- Modeling information
- Height: 5 ft 11.5 in (1.82 m)
- Hair color: Black
- Eye color: Brown
- Agency: Elite Models (2009)

Erez Da Drezner (Hebrew: ארז דה דרזנר; born August 1, 1978) is a Deaf Israeli model, fitness trainer, lecturer, and a finalist in the second season of the Big Brother television show.

== Biography ==
Da Drezner was born in Haifa, Israel, to a mother who has been a hairdresser and owns a jewelry business, and to a father who was a jeweler. He has two brothers.

Erez's great-grandfather, Yehoshua Dressner, was murdered in the Holocaust when he was in his 60's. Therefore Erez father's name was Yehoshua (born in 1951). Erez's grandfather, Oskar Dresner who was born in 1910, was a Holocaust survivor.

As a child, he attended a special education school in Haifa, and later studied jewelry in WIZO school. After graduating from high school, he enlisted in the Israel Defense Forces in the Medical Corps. After his discharge from the army, he studied interior design, cooking and confectionery. He worked as a model at the Elite Modeling Agency, in which he participated in photography for Elle magazine with the model Anya Martirosov. In 2005, he worked as an instructor in special education schools and was active in the "Shema" club.

=== Participation in Big Brother ===
When he was 31 years old, Da Drezner became a contestant in the second season of Big Brother in Israel, with the aim of being a positive and inspiring model for the Deaf community. He stated that he wanted the watchers to learn to accept the Deaf and hard of hearing people as they were. Further, he stated that his motto was "Positive Energies" alongside "And whatever", and became one of the standout characters of this season. Da Drezner's participation in the program caused an echo in the Deaf community, which saw him as a groundbreaking figure. Da Drezner was also featured in several episodes of the television show Eretz Nehederet, played by Eli Finish.

105 days after entering the Big Brother house, Da Drezner was expelled after reaching sixth place.

In 2010 and 2011, he wrote a weekly column on the Mako website about the tenants in the Big Brother show.

In 2012, he sued the production company and Keshet Media Group, after he allegedly received psychiatric pills during the show that caused him side effects, including depression and dysfunction.

=== Personal life ===
On July 18, 2024, Da Drezner married Oleksandra Tymchuk, a Ukrainian Deaf woman, at Lviv. They met on Instagram in 2016, and grew closer after Russia's invasion of Ukraine on 24 February 2022 and after Hamas's surprise attack on Israel on 7 October 2023. They have a hearing son. They held their wedding and birth celebration in Haifa on October 3, 2025. Petite Meller and Zion Merili were present.

== Career ==
After completing the Big Brother show, Da Drezner led in 2010 a nationwide fundraising campaign for Nitzan and Shema Associations, and made lectures in schools across Israel.

In 2011, he participated at a special fashion show in honor of the IGY organization, which ended the fashion week. In 2012, he participated in the winter campaign at the Hutzot HaMifratz complex.

At a demonstration of Deaf people, which was held in front of the government building in Tel Aviv on December 30, 2012, against the cancellation of the interpretation in culture and leisure sections, Da Drezner appeared alongside MK Dov Khenin and the nineteenth Knesset candidates Karine Elharrar, Shai Piron and Stav Shafir.

He also participated in television shows, including Wipeout Israel and Laughter from Work – Shalom Asaig's standup show on Channel 13. He also contested and served on the jury in three beauty pageants for the Miss Deaf: in 2013, he contested in the Miss & Mister Deaf World pageant in Prague, the Czech Republic, and in the same year he contested in the Miss & Mister Deaf International pageant in Sofia, Bulgaria, where he won the title of "Mister Deaf Photogenic". Afterwards he went to Tokyo for lecturing about sports and a proper nutrition in the Miss Deaf Japan contest.

In 2015, he assisted the "Miss and Mister Deaf Japan 2015" pageant, which was organized by MMDI, made a sponsorship of the Harley-Davidson motorcycles upon clothing and accessories, and served as a jury in the contest. In February 2019, he served on the jury with his brother, Tomer Drezner, in the "Miss and Mister Deaf Israel 2019" contest, which was held at the Helen Keller House of the Association of the Deaf in Israel in Tel Aviv.

Da Drezner holds a professional certificate of fitness training from the Wingate Institute and serves as a fitness trainer in Israel and around the world, after receiving a certificate from Holmes Place in 2012 for his degree as an outstanding employee in the fitness department.

In 2014, he participated in the group photography exhibition "Another Illusion" by the photographer Ilan Siman-Tov, together with celebrities of culture and entertainment. He played Samson.

In 2021, Da Drezner joined Grace Model Management in Tel Aviv. In the same year, Da Drezner said in an interview that he played a guitar in the Paris Métro between auditions, and earned euros.

In February 2024, Da Drezner went to Ukraine as a representative of The Association of the Deaf in Israel (Acha), met Irina Chepchinathe, the chairwoman of the Ukrainian Society of the Deaf (UTOG), told his biography and the Israel–Hamas war in comparison to the Russian invasion of Ukraine, and went on to Poland.

In September 2024, Da Drezner volunteered at the oncology center of the regional hospital for children in Rivne, under the sponsorship of Olena Zelenska. He visited also the military hospital at Zdolbuniv and agreed to assist with raising funds for the hospital.

In November 2024 at Tirat Carmel, Da Drezner met Shimon Briman, a historian, the head of the Eastern Europe Desk at the University of Haifa and a former journalist in Vesty. They talked about Da Drezner's journey to Ukraine, and about Da Drezner's future meeting with Yevhen Korniychuk, the ambassador of Ukraine in Israel, for an event of Deaf Ukrainian refugees in Israel. Briman also attended the Drezner's celebration in October 2025.

In July 2025, Da Drezner was on the jury of the Miss & Mister Deaf World contest in Prague.
