= Big Brother (Israeli TV series) season 1 =

Big Brother
- Season 1
- Presented by: Erez Tal; Assi Azar
- No. of days: 107
- No. of housemates: 20
- Winner: Shifra Cornfield
- Runner-up: Yossi Boublil
- No. of episodes: 32

Release
- Original network: Channel 2 (Keshet)
- Original release: 1 September – 16 December 2008

Season chronology
- Next → Season 2

HaAh HaGadol 1 (Hebrew: האח הגדול 1, lit. The Big Brother 1) is the first series of the Israeli version of the reality show Big Brother. The show was first broadcast on Channel 2 on 1 September 2008 and ended on 16 December 2008. Erez Tal and Assi Azar co-host the show.

The show aired on Sunday and Tuesday nights. In addition to the main show broadcast on Channel 2, there was a 24-hour live stream on the HOT channel 20, and also on the Internet via Mako. Internet viewers could choose which camera images they want to view, while HOT viewers could only see camera images chosen by the Big Brother staff.

Sixteen housemates entering the house during the launch show and another four joined after 56 days. The housemates competed for a one million shekel prize. The housemates included a set of non-identical twin brothers and a father and daughter.

The house was located in Neve Ilan, a suburb of Jerusalem. The house was equipped with 50 surveillance cameras which were operated by the Big Brother in-house staff.

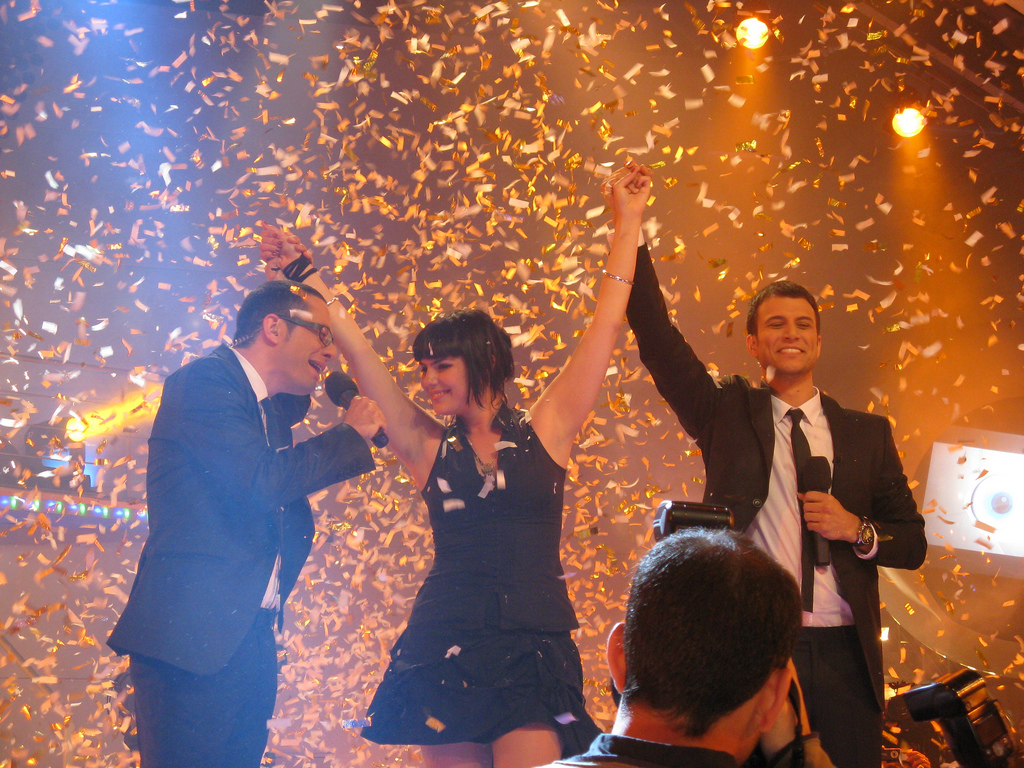
Erez Tal and Assi Azar with the winner Shifra Cornfeld.

== Housemates ==
Name	Day entered	Day exited	Status
Shifra	1	107	Winner
Yossi	1	107	Runner-up
Itay	1	107	Third Place
Einav	1	107	Fourth Place
Leon	1	107	Fifth Place
Shachar	56	100	Evicted
Yoni	56	93	Evicted
Inna	56	93	Evicted
Ranin	1	86	Evicted
Hagit	56	79	Evicted
Tzabar	1	72	Evicted
Vanessa	1	65	Evicted
Shay	1	51	Evicted
Asher	1	44	Evicted
Keren	1	37	Evicted
Jenny	1	28	Evicted
Naama	1	26	Walked
Eran	1	23	Evicted
Miki	1	16	Evicted
Boris	1	9	Evicted

=== Asher ===
Asher Simoni, A 29-year-old man from Tiberias. Asher's wife was pregnant when he entered the house and gave birth as her husband took part in the show. He first met his newborn daughter moments after his eviction on live television. He works as a clerk at a post office. Asher was mainly known for his strong religious views and his obsessive smoking.

=== Boris ===
Boris Schneiderovsky, A 22-year-old man from Ra'anana. His non-identical twin brother, Leon, also participated in the show.

=== Einav ===
Einav Boublil, A 23-year-old woman from Ashkelon. Her father Yossi entered the house as the sixteenth housemate, to Einav's surprise.

=== Eran ===
Eran Zilberman, A 26-year-old man from Tel Aviv. He works in the "high tech" industry.

=== Inna ===
Inna Braverman, A 22-year-old woman from Acre.

=== Itay ===
Itay Ziv, A 28-year-old man from Tel Aviv. He works in a circus as an acrobat. Engaged in a romantic relationship with Vanessa throughout the season. When Yoni entered the house the relationship between Itay and Vanessa broke apart as Vanessa was more interested in Yoni. After leaving the house Yoni got back together with Vanessa.

=== Jenny ===
Jenny Tukrev, A 23-year-old woman from Tel Aviv.

=== Keren ===
Keren Khasis, A 24-year-old woman from Tel Aviv and Herzliya.

=== Hagit ===
Hagit Ronen Maimon, A 43-year-old woman from Beersheba. She works as a jewelry store owner and jewelry designer.

=== Leon ===
Leon Schneiderovsky. A 22-year-old gay man from Ra'anana. His non-identical twin brother Boris was also in the house. Leon works at a clothing store as a salesman and is known in the house for his gentle character and friendship with housemate Einav and then with Shifra. He had a crush on fellow-housemate Shay early in the competition.

=== Miki ===
Miki Levin, A 31-year-old woman from Ramat HaSharon. She came to the house as the mean blonde woman, but after having fought with other housemates she was evicted.

=== Naama ===
Naama Friedmann, A 34-year-old writer from Liman. Her main goal in coming to the show was to promote her first book "Like There Is No Tomorrow". Naama was initially appreciated by other housemates, as they saw her as the caring mother housemate. But soon enough they discovered she was trying to manipulate people and pick fights. The housemates tried to vote her off but the audience brought her back twice. After failing to vote her off, she was shunned by the other housemates until she decided to leave the show of her own free will.

=== Ranin ===
Ranin Boulos, A 24-year-old woman from Neve Shalom, a village jointly established by Jewish and Arab citizens of Israel, that is engaged in educational work for peace, equality and understanding between the two peoples. In the series she was chosen to represent the Israeli Arab demographic but being a professional actor opted to be more of a drama queen and trouble maker. Early on she made an impression that she was very emotional, and threatened to leave the show a few times after having fights with other housemates. After being evicted she concluded it was a once in a lifetime positive experience.

=== Shachar ===
Shachar Ben David, A 28-year-old bodybuilder from Kokhav Yair.

=== Shay ===
Shay Sheetrit, A 25-year-old man from Tel Aviv. He works as a manager in a bar. Due to a death in Shay's family the Big Brother gave Shay permission to attend his aunt's funeral for a few hours (outside the Big Brother house) so he wasn't present for his eviction on day 51.

=== Shifra ===
Shifra Cornfeld, The winner of "HaAh HaGadol", A 27-year-old woman from Jerusalem. She works as a flight attendant for El Al. Shifra was born to a religious family and chose to leave the orthodox lifestyle and become a secular Jew. On July 26, 2009, Shifra was a phone-in guest on Big Brothers Little Brother, a spin-off of Big Brother UK and was asked questions on her time in the house.

=== Tzabar ===
Tzabar Gadish, A 27-year-old man from Binyamina.

=== Vanessa ===
Vanessa Allouche, A 27-year-old French immigrant woman from Bitan Aharon. She Engaged in a romantic relationship with Itay throughout the season. When Yoni entered the house the relationship between Itay and Vanessa broke apart as Vanessa was more interested in Yoni. After leaving the house Yoni got back together with Vanessa.

In 2017 she participated in France of Cash Island.

=== Yoni ===
Yoni Vinkel, A 30-year-old man from Arad. His father is a Dutch Christian, and his mother is an Iranian Jew.

=== Yossi ===
Yossi Boublil, A 56-year-old man from Ashkelon. His daughter, Einav is also in the house.

== HaAhot HaKtana ==
HaAhot HaKtana (Hebrew: האחות הקטנה, The Little Sister) provided a comedic criticism of all the events that took place throughout the week in the Big Brother House. The show aired several times a week on Bip (channel 6 on the HOT cable network), which presented a one-hour-long episode on Friday nights which starred the most recently evicted housemate. The show was hosted by Efrat Abramov and throughout the week previous housemates and well known entertainment personalities critique the daily events of the house. The program only aired during the first two seasons.

== Nominations table ==
	Week 1		Week 2	Week 3	Week 4	Week 5	Week 6	Week 7	Week 9	Week 10	Week 11	Week 12	Week 13	Week 14	Final Week 15	
Shifra	Keren; Miki	Naama; Yossi	Asher; Itay	Asher; Itay	No; Nominations	Einav; Yossi	Yossi, Einav	Yossi; Einav	Itay; Yossi	Yossi; Itay	Ranin	Shachar; Yoni	No; Nominations	Einav; Yossi	Winner (Day 107)	
Yossi	Naama; Tzabar	Keren; Shay	Naama; Venessa	Naama; Eran	No; Nominations	Tzabar; Shifra	Shifra; Asher	Shifra; Shay	Shifra; Venessa	Tzabar; Shifra	Einav	Shifra; Ranin	No; Nominations	Itay; Shachar	Runner-Up (Day 107)	
Itay	Miki; Shay	Einav; Yossi	Vanessa; Yossi	Shifra; Eran	No; Nominations	Ranin; Keren	Einav; Asher	Shay; Shifra	Shifra; Tzabar	Inna; Shachar	Einav	Shachar; Inna	No; Nominations	Leon; Shachar	Third Place (Day 107)	
Einav	Boris, Itay	Boris, Shifra	Naama, Venessa	Eran, Shifra	No; Nominations	Tzabar, Shifra	Shifra, Shay	Shifra, Shay	Leon, Venessa	Hagit, Tzabar	Yossi	Shifra, Ranin	No; Nominations	Shachar, Shifra	Fourth Place (Day 107)	
Leon	Eran, Jenny	Eran, Itay	Naama, Yossi	Naama, Yossi	No; Nominations	Yossi, Keren	Asher, Yossi	Yossi, Shay	Itay, Venessa	Shachar, Hagit	Shifra	Shachar, Yossi	No; Nominations	Itay, Shachar	Fifth Place (Day 107)	
Shachar	Not in House								Shifra, Tzabar	Shifra, Tzabar	Hagit	Shifra, Ranin	No; Nominations	Leon, Itay	Evicted (Day 100)	
Yoni	Not in House								Einav, Tzabar	Einav, Shifra	Ranin	Shifra, Einav	No; Nominations	Evicted (Day 93)		
Inna	Not in House								Shifra; Tzabar	Yossi; Tzabar	Ranin	Shifra; Yoni	No; Nominations	Evicted (Day 93)		
Ranin	Boris, Eran	Asher, Yossi	Keren, Naama	Naama, Eran	No; Nominations	Itay, Venessa	Yossi, Einav	Venessa, Yossi	Venessa, Yossi	Yossi, Shachar	Shifra	Yossi, Shachar	Evicted (Day 86)			
Hagit	Not in House								Leon, Shifra	Yossi, Shifra	Inna	Evicted (Day 79)				
Tzabar	Einav, Yossi	Einav, Yossi	Miki, Naama	Naama, Keren	No; Nominations	Asher, Yossi	Itay, Venessa	Itay, Venessa	Itay, Venessa	Shachar, Yoni	Evicted (Day 72)					
Venessa	Boris, Yossi	Boris, Yossi	Einav, Yossi	Einav, Eran	No; Nominations	Ranin, Shay	Ranin, Yossi	Ranin, Shay	Leon, Ranin	Evicted (Day 65)						
Shay	Einav, Tzabar	Einav, Yossi	Einav, Miki	Naama, Einav	No; Nominations	Einav, Keren	Yossi, Einav	Einav, Itay	Evicted (Day 51)							
Asher	Miki, Shay	Shifra, Yossi	Naama, Shifra	Naama, Keren	No; Nominations	Tzabar, Shifra	Refused	Evicted (Day 44)								
Keren	Miki, Yossi	Miki, Yossi	Einav, Miki	Eran, Naama	No; Nominations	Tzabar, Shifra	Evicted (Day 37)									
Jenny	Einav, Leon	Einav, Leon	Naama, Shay	Naama, Keren	No; Nominations	Evicted (Day 28)										
Naama	Jenny, Yossi	Shifra, Yossi	Einav, Miki	Shay, Shifra	No; Nominations	Walked (Day 26)										
Eran	Itay, Venessa	Einav, Yossi	Einav, Yossi	Naama, Einav	Evicted (Day 23)											
Miki	Boris, Itay	Boris, Yossi	Naama, Venessa	Evicted (Day 16)												
Boris	Asher, Ranin	Miki, Yossi	Evicted (Day 9)													
Notes	^{1}		none		^{2}	^{3}	none	^{4}	^{5}	none	^{6}	none	^{7}	^{8}	^{9}	
Nominated for eviction	Boris, Miki, Yossi	Boris, Einav, Shifra, Yossi	Einav, Miki, Naama, Venessa, Yossi	Einav, Shifra, Naama, Keren, Eran	Asher, Einav, Itay, Jenny, Keren, Leon, ~~Naama,~~; Ronin, Shay, Shifra, Tzabar, Venessa, Yossi	Yossi, Keren, Einav, Asher	Asher, Einav, Yossi	Shay, Shifra, Yossi	Shifra, Tzabar, Venessa	Shachar, Shifra, Tzabar, Yossi	Inna, Itay, Hagit, Leon, Shachar, Yoni, Yossi	Shifra, Ranin, Shachar	All; Housemates	Einav, Itay, Leon, Shachar, Shifra, Yossi	Einav, Itay, Leon, Shifra, Yossi	
Walked	none				Naama	none										
Evicted	Boris		Miki	Eran	Jenny	Keren	Asher	Shay	Venessa	Tzabar	Hagit	Ranin	Inna; Yoni	Shachar	Leon; 3.59% to win	Einav; 4.93% to win
Evicted	Boris		Miki	Eran	Jenny	Keren	Asher	Shay	Venessa	Tzabar	Hagit	Ranin	Inna; Yoni	Shachar	Itay; 7.62% to win	Yossi; 34.53% to win
Evicted	Boris		Miki	Eran	Jenny	Keren	Asher	Shay	Venessa	Tzabar	Hagit	Ranin	Inna; Yoni	Shachar	Shifra; 49.33% to win	

=== Notes ===
- ^1 On Day 2 Boris, Miki and Yossi were nominated and the public was given ten minutes to vote. However, a mistake coming from the production meant that only Boris and Yossi faced the public's vote after Miki's nomination was miscalculated. Out of Boris and Yossi, Boris was evicted and interviewed by the show's hosts. Once the mistake was noticed he was put back into the house. The nominations were re-held on Day 7.
- ^2 All housemates were automatically nominated for a special eviction on Day 28.
- ^3 Originally Einav and Asher were not nominated for eviction, but they tried to deceive Big Brother and send Tzabar and Shifra for nomination. Big Brother exposed the fraud and replaced Tzabar and Shifra with Asher and Einav.
- ^4 Big Brother gave Shay permission to attend his aunt's funeral for a few hours (outside the house) so he wasn't present for his eviction.
- ^5 Inna, Hagit, Shachar and Yoni were immune from being nominated because they are new housemates.
- ^6 Housemates nominated who they wanted to stay in the house and the three or more housemates with the MOST nominations were the only ones safe this Week.
- ^7 All housemates automatically faced the public vote this week, and for the first time, two housemates were evicted from the Big Brother house.
- ^8 In week 14, any housemate who got at least one vote, was nominated for eviction.
- ^9 There were no nominations in the final week and the public was voting for housemates to win, rather than be evicted. the housemate with the most SMS votes was the winner.
