= Super Bowl LIII =

2019 National Football League championship game

| New England Patriots (2) (AFC) (11–5) | Los Angeles Rams (2) (NFC) (13–3) |
|---|---|
| 13 | 3 |
| Head coach: Bill Belichick | Head coach: Sean McVay |
| | 1 | 2 | 3 | 4 | Total |
|---|---|---|---|---|---|
| NE | 0 | 3 | 0 | 10 | 13 |
| LAR | 0 | 0 | 3 | 0 | 3 |
- Date: February 3, 2019
- Stadium: Mercedes-Benz Stadium; Atlanta, Georgia
- MVP: Julian Edelman, wide receiver
- Favorite: Patriots by 2.5
- Referee: John Parry
- Attendance: 70,081

Ceremonies
- National anthem: Gladys Knight
- Coin toss: Bernice King
- Halftime show: Maroon 5 featuring Travis Scott and Big Boi

TV in the United States
- Network: CBS; ESPN Deportes
- Announcers: Jim Nantz (play-by-play); Tony Romo (analyst); Tracy Wolfson and Evan Washburn (sideline reporters); Jay Feely (special teams analyst); Gene Steratore (rules analyst)
- Nielsen ratings: 41.1 (national); 57.4 (Boston); 44.6 (Los Angeles); U.S. viewership: 98.2 million est. avg.
- Cost of 30-second commercial: $5.25 million

Radio in the United States
- Network: Westwood One; ESPN Deportes Radio
- Announcers: Kevin Harlan (play-by-play); Kurt Warner and Mike Holmgren (analysts); Ed Werder and Tony Boselli (sideline reporters); Kenneth Garay (play-by-play- ESPN Deportes Radio); Sebastian Martínez Christensen (analyst- ESPN Deportes Radio)

Super Bowl LIII was an American football game played to determine the champion of the National Football League (NFL) for the 2018 season. The American Football Conference (AFC) champion New England Patriots defeated the National Football Conference (NFC) champion Los Angeles Rams, 13–3. The game was played on February 3, 2019, at Mercedes-Benz Stadium in Atlanta and was the first Super Bowl played at the stadium.

The Patriots' victory was their sixth, tying the Pittsburgh Steelers for the most Super Bowl championships. New England, after finishing the regular season with an 11–5 record, advanced to their 11th Super Bowl appearance, their third in a row, and their ninth under the leadership of head coach Bill Belichick and quarterback Tom Brady. The Rams finished the regular season with a 13–3 record under head coach Sean McVay, the youngest head coach in the Super Bowl at 33, as they advanced to their fourth Super Bowl appearance and their first since relocating back from St. Louis to Los Angeles in 2016. The two franchises previously met in Super Bowl XXXVI, the first championship won by Belichick and Brady and the beginning of the Patriots dynasty. It was the 13th meeting in a major sports championship between the Greater Los Angeles and Greater Boston areas and the first championship between the two regions in the NFL. The game also marked the first Super Bowl appearance of a Los Angeles-based team since the Los Angeles Raiders appeared in 1983's Super Bowl XVIII and the Rams' first as a Los Angeles team since 1979's Super Bowl XIV.

Super Bowl LIII was the lowest-scoring Super Bowl in NFL history. The game marked the first Super Bowl in which neither team had a touchdown through the first three quarters, with the Patriots and the Rams fighting to a 3–3 tie entering the fourth. In the final quarter, New England scored 10 unanswered points to claim victory, including the game's only touchdown by running back Sony Michel. The Patriots' one touchdown tied them with the New York Jets in Super Bowl III for the fewest by a winning Super Bowl team, while the Rams became the second Super Bowl team to not score a touchdown after the Miami Dolphins in Super Bowl VI. Patriots wide receiver Julian Edelman, who caught 10 passes for 141 yards, was named Super Bowl MVP. Brady and Belichick became the oldest starting quarterback and head coach to win the Super Bowl at 41 and 66, respectively, and Brady was also the first starting quarterback to win the Super Bowl in his 40s. It marked the final Super Bowl of the Patriots dynasty, as Brady departed New England after the 2019 season.

The broadcast of the game on CBS, along with the halftime show headlined by American pop group Maroon 5, saw the smallest Super Bowl audience in 10 years. Due to its low-scoring nature and both teams' offensive struggles, as well as the poor reception of the halftime show, the game has been regarded as one of the worst Super Bowls.

== Background ==
=== Host-selection process ===
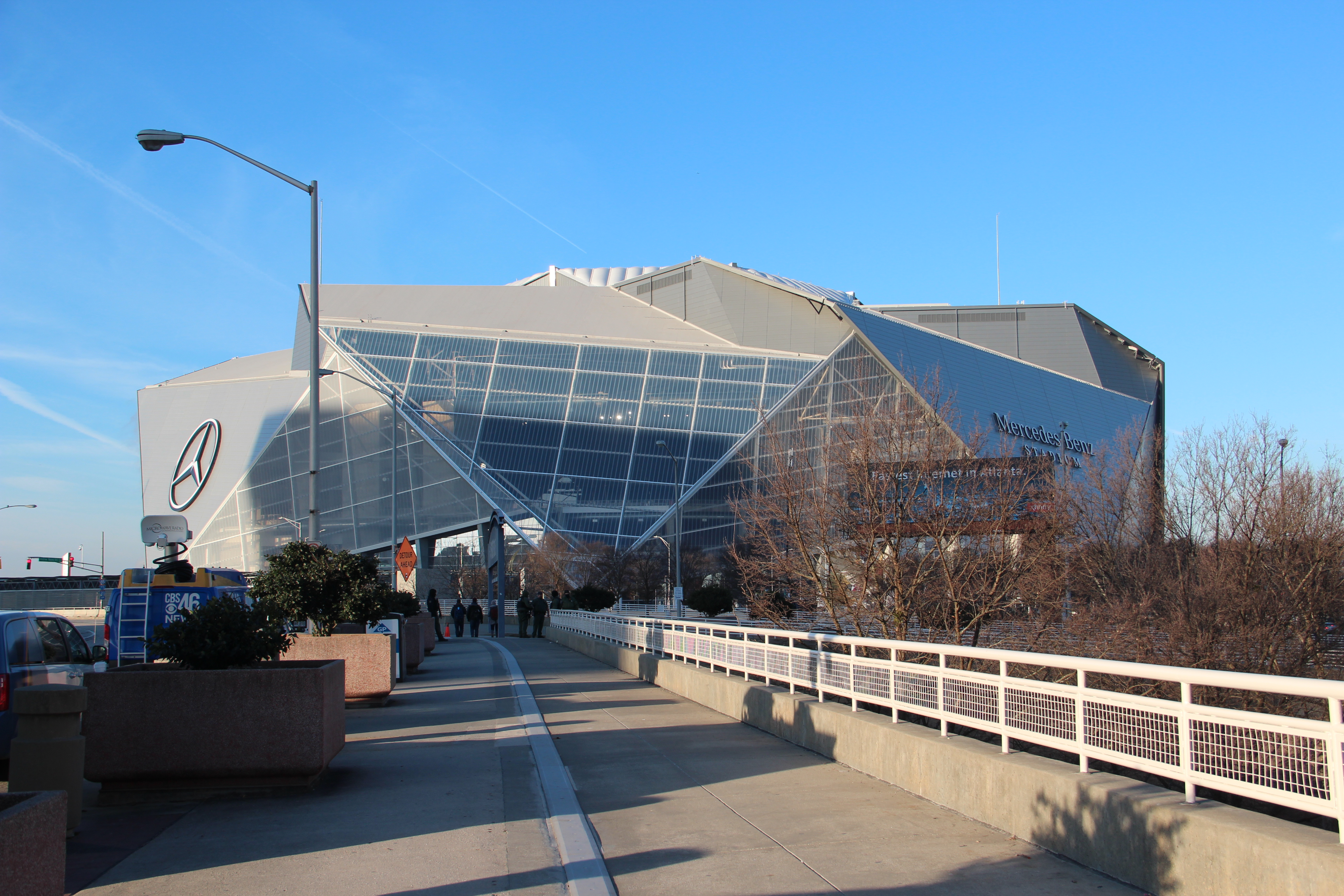
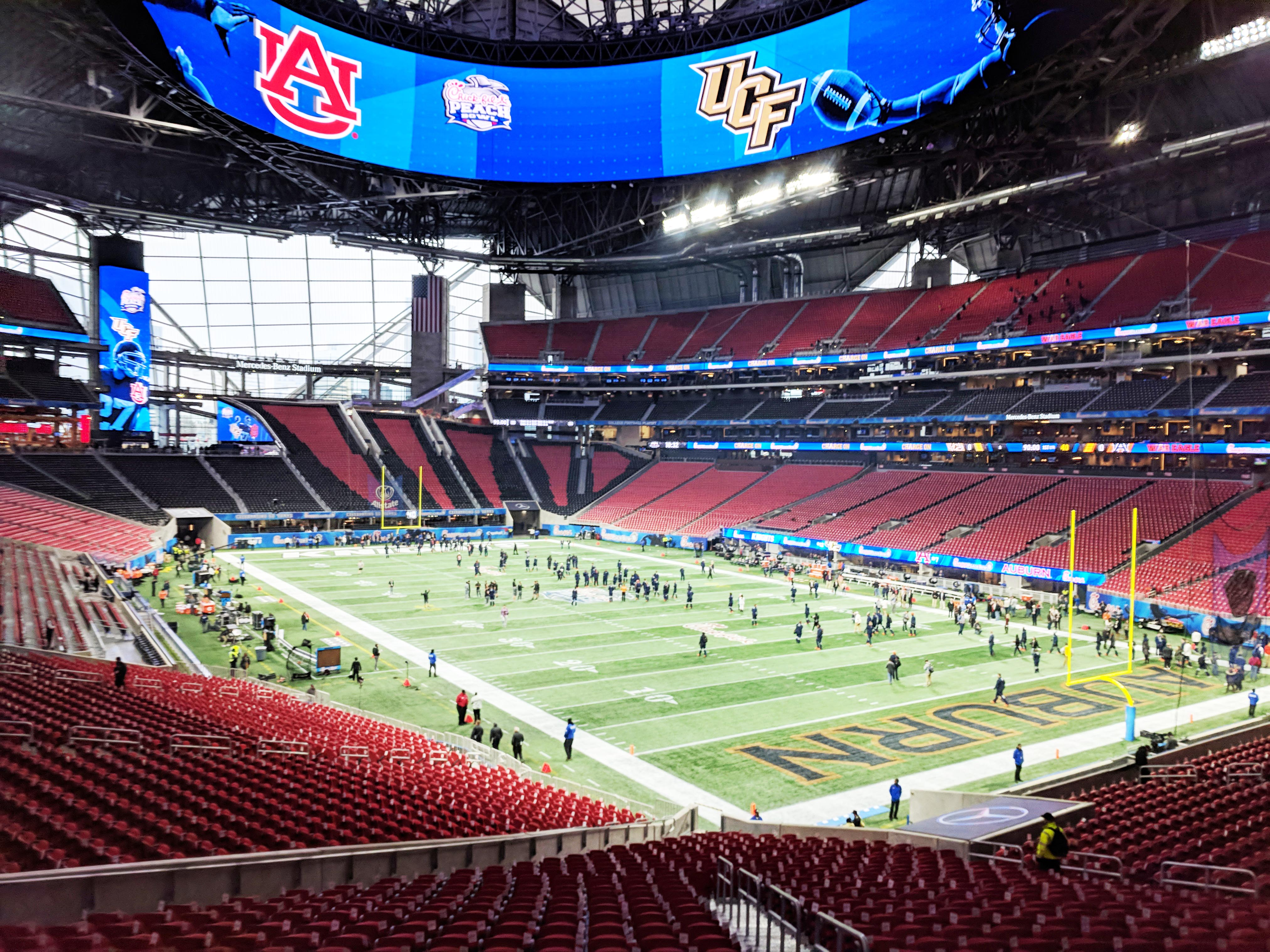
Mercedes-Benz Stadium, host venue of Super Bowl LIII

On May 19, 2015, the league announced the four finalists that would compete to host Super Bowl LIII in 2019, LIV in 2020 and LV in 2021. NFL owners voted on these cities on May 24, 2016, with the first round of voting determining the host for Super Bowl LIII, the second round deciding a different site for Super Bowl LIV and the third round deciding the site for Super Bowl LV. The four finalists for Super Bowl LIII, all in the Southeastern United States, were:

- Mercedes-Benz Stadium, Atlanta: This would be the first Super Bowl played at Mercedes-Benz Stadium after it opened in 2017. The city had previously hosted two Super Bowls at the Georgia Dome, with the last being Super Bowl XXXIV in 2000.
- Hard Rock Stadium, Miami Gardens, Florida: South Florida had previously hosted 10 Super Bowls, with the last being Super Bowl XLIV in 2010.
- Mercedes-Benz Superdome, New Orleans, Louisiana: New Orleans had previously hosted 10 Super Bowls, with the last being Super Bowl XLVII in 2013.
- Raymond James Stadium, Tampa, Florida: Tampa had hosted four Super Bowls, with the last being Super Bowl XLIII in 2009.

After three votes, Atlanta was awarded Super Bowl LIII at the NFL owners' meeting on May 24, 2016. The losing candidates, except for New Orleans which removed itself from the voting for all games except Super Bowl LIII due to event conflicts in 2020 and 2021, were then pitted against SoFi Stadium in Inglewood, California for Super Bowl LIV and Super Bowl LV hosting rights. Miami eventually won the rights to host Super Bowl LIV and Los Angeles won the rights to host Super Bowl LV. However, on May 23, 2017, NFL owners opted to award Super Bowl LV to Tampa and give Super Bowl LVI to Los Angeles after it was announced that SoFi Stadium would open in 2020 due to construction delays. New Orleans would be awarded Super Bowl LVIII (later changed to Super Bowl LIX due to expanding the regular season to 17 games and causing conflict with Mardi Gras).

The NFL unveiled the official logo for Super Bowl LIII in February 2018; it is a navy blue-tinted version of the design that was introduced at Super Bowl LI, and the overall branding of the game featured use of blue and red. The host committee logo featured a stylized overhead rendition of Mercedes-Benz Stadium's roof.

=== Associated events ===
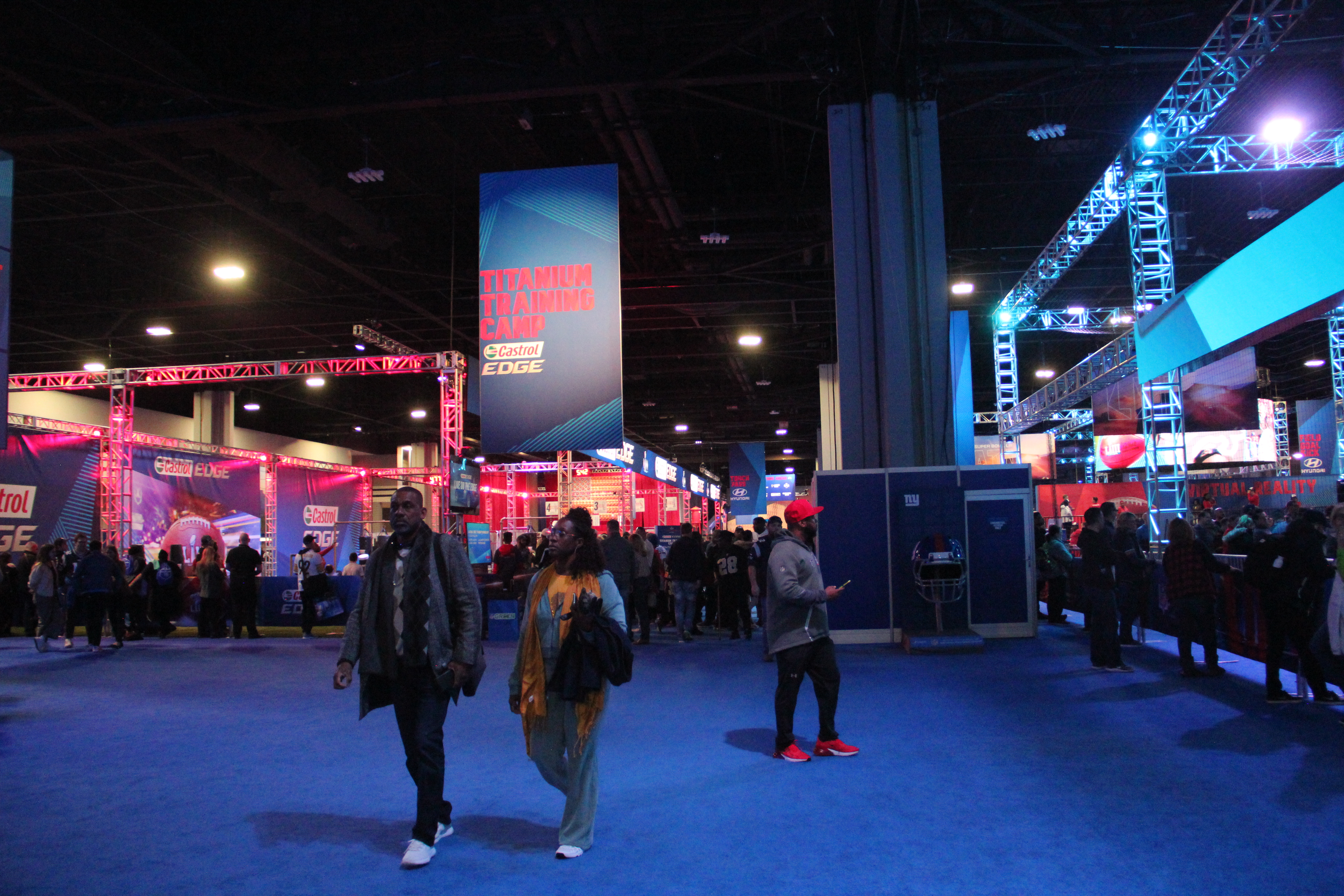
The Super Bowl Experience at the Georgia World Congress Center

Pre-game events and entertainment were centered around downtown Atlanta, with State Farm Arena having hosted Super Bowl Opening Night, the Georgia World Congress Center hosting the Super Bowl Experience and Super Bowl Live at Centennial Olympic Park. State Farm Arena also hosted the inaugural Bud Light Super Bowl Music Fest, a three-night concert series that was headlined by Ludacris and Migos (night 1), Aerosmith and Post Malone (night 2), and Bruno Mars and Cardi B (night 3). The show competed with a "Super Saturday Night" concert held by DirecTV at a temporary venue near Atlantic Station, headlined by the Foo Fighters and featuring Roger Taylor, Zac Brown, Tom Morello, Perry Farrell and Dave Koz as special guests.

The NFL officially launched its centennial commemorations at Super Bowl LIII, ahead of its 100th season. A themed, two-minute advertisement was aired during the game.

== Teams ==
=== New England Patriots ===
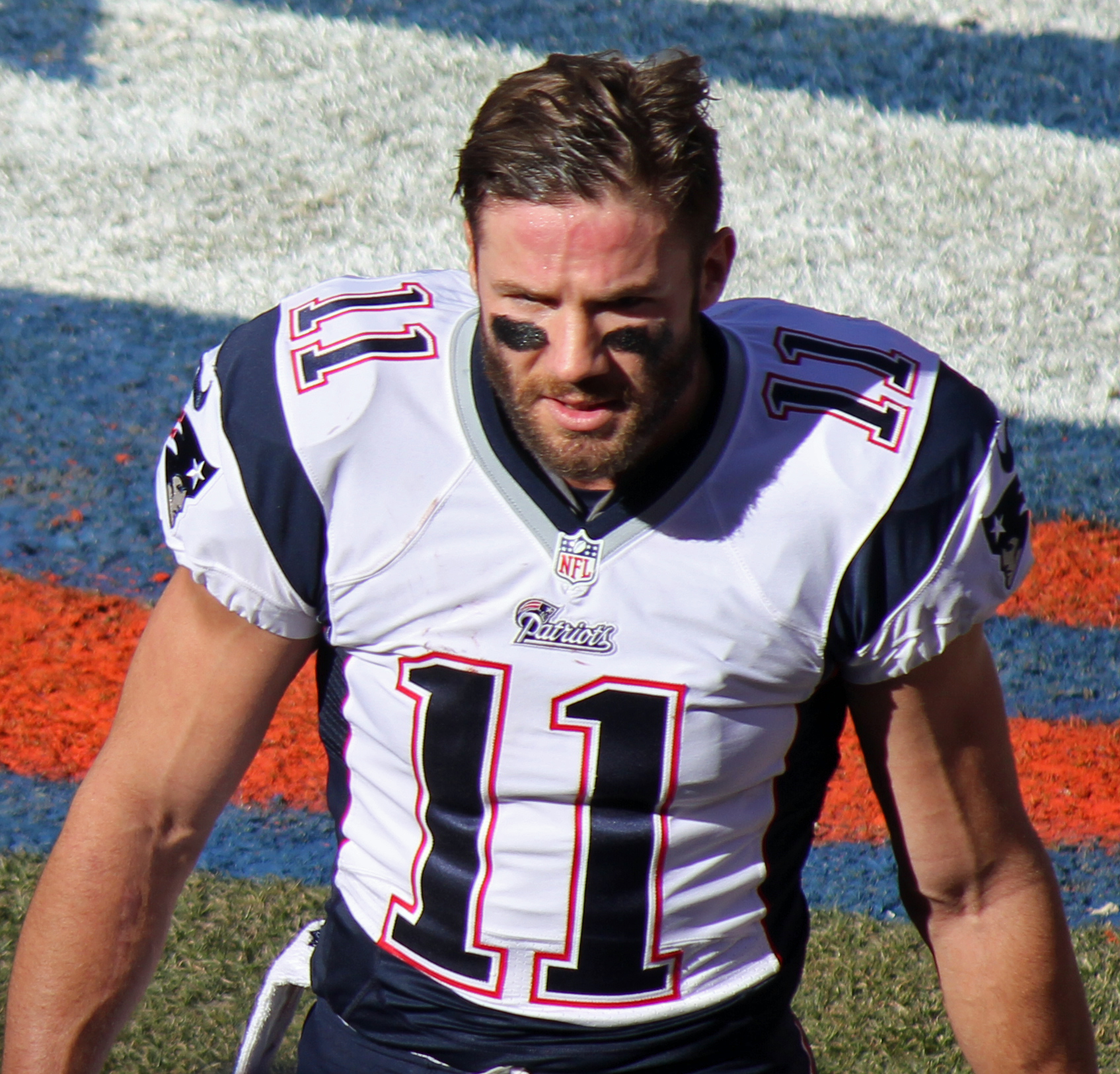
Wide receiver Julian Edelman returned to the Patriots after missing the 2017 season with injury

The Patriots finished the 2018 season with an 11–5 record to earn the #2 seed in the AFC and their 17th season with at least ten wins in their 19 years under 66-year-old head coach Bill Belichick. They went on to join the Miami Dolphins and Buffalo Bills as the only teams in NFL history to ever reach three consecutive Super Bowls, they were later joined by the Kansas City Chiefs. Though the team had only two Pro Bowl selections, they scored 436 points (fourth in the league) while giving up only 325 (seventh fewest).

Patriots quarterback Tom Brady earned his 14th Pro Bowl selection at age 41, finishing the season with 4,355 passing yards and 29 touchdowns, with only 11 interceptions, while also rushing for 35 yards and two more scores on the ground. These totals made him just the second quarterback in NFL history to amass 70,000 career passing yards and 1,000 rushing yards. His top receiver from the previous season, Brandin Cooks, was traded to the eventual Super Bowl rival Rams, but Julian Edelman, who not only had missed the previous season with a torn ACL injury but was suspended for the first four games of the regular season after testing positive for PEDs, returned to catch 74 receptions for a team-leading 850 yards and six touchdowns, while also returning 20 punts for 154 yards. Other key receivers included Chris Hogan (35 receptions for 553 yards and three touchdowns) and Josh Gordon (40 receptions for 720 yards and three touchdowns), though Gordon would end up leaving the team to focus on his mental health after 11 games when faced with a suspension for violating the league's substance abuse policy. Tight end Rob Gronkowski added 47 receptions for 682 yards and three touchdowns. Meanwhile, the running game featured a dynamic new weapon, rookie halfback Sony Michel, who lead the team with 931 rushing yards and 6 touchdowns, along with veteran James White who racked up 1,176 yards from scrimmage while leading the team in receptions (87) and total touchdowns (12). On special teams, receiver Cordarrelle Patterson returned 23 kickoffs for 663 yards and a touchdown, an average of 28.8 yards per return (third in the NFL), while also catching 21 passes for 247 yards, rushing for 228 yards and scoring four touchdowns on offense.

On defense, defensive end Trey Flowers led the team with 7.5 sacks and also forced three fumbles. Linebacker Kyle Van Noy led the team in total tackles (92), while also recording 3.5 sacks, a forced fumble and two fumble recoveries. In the secondary, safety Duron Harmon led the team in interceptions for the second year in a row with four, while Pro Bowl cornerback Stephon Gilmore intercepted two passes and forced two fumbles. Safety Patrick Chung also made an impact with 84 total tackles to go with an interception and a fumble recovery. The Patriots secondary also featured twin brothers Jason McCourty and Devin McCourty, who both had an interception each. Devin had 82 tackles, while Jason had 70.

=== Los Angeles Rams ===
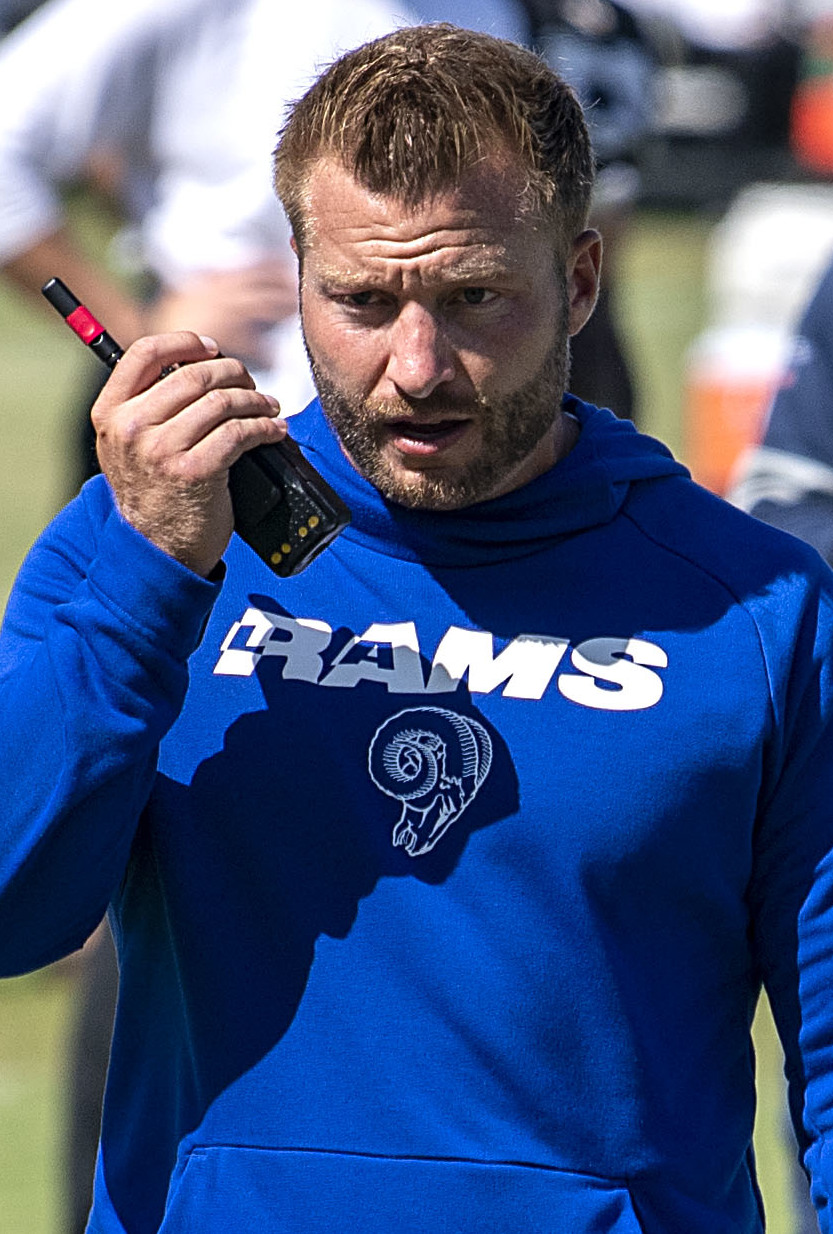
Sean McVay was the youngest head coach to reach the Super Bowl

The Rams finished the 2018 season earning the #2 seed in the NFC, before knocking off the fourth seeded Dallas Cowboys in the divisional round and top seeded New Orleans Saints in the NFC Championship to earn their fourth Super Bowl in franchise history. The Rams went from 2004 to 2016 without recording a winning record. After relocating from St. Louis back to Los Angeles and posting a dismal 4–12 season in 2016, the team's fortunes changed with the hiring of 30-year-old head coach Sean McVay, the youngest head coach in NFL history. Under McVay and second year quarterback Jared Goff, who recovered from a lackluster winless rookie season to record a triple digit passer rating, the Rams improved to an 11–5 record in 2017. Then in 2018, they won their first eight games and finished the year with a 13–3 record, tying the Saints for the best record in the NFC. New Orleans won the top seed since they had defeated the Rams in the regular season.

The Rams offense ranked second in the NFL in both points scored (527) and yards gained (6,738). Goff continued to improve in his third season, setting new career highs in passing yards (4,688, fourth in the NFL), passing touchdowns (32), passer rating (101.1), rushing yards (108) and rushing touchdowns (two). His top receiver was Robert Woods, who caught 86 passes for 1,219 yards and 6 touchdowns. Brandin Cooks, an off-season pickup from the Patriots via trade, also made a big impact with 80 receptions for 1,204 yards and 5 scores. The team's #3 receiver, Cooper Kupp, suffered a season ending injury after catching 40 passes for 566 yards in 8 games, forcing Goff to rely heavily on other targets like Gerald Everett (32 receptions) and Josh Reynolds (29). Pro Bowl running back Todd Gurley was the team's leading rusher with 1,251 yards (fourth in the NFL) and 17 touchdowns, while also catching 59 passes for 580 yards and five more touchdowns. His 17 rushing touchdowns led the league, while his 22 total touchdowns gave him 132 points, fifth in the NFL. Running back C. J. Anderson, who made the Rams his third different team in 2018 after signing up with them in December, also was a key aspect of the running game, finishing the season with 405 yards and leading the team in rushing in both of their playoff victories. On special teams, JoJo Natson returned 26 punts for 280 yards, while kicker Greg Zuerlein made 87.1% of his field goals, including a franchise postseason record 57-yard kick to defeat the Saints in overtime in the NFC championship game.

The Rams defense featured Pro Bowl defensive tackle Aaron Donald, who led the league in sacks with 20.5, as many sacks as the rest of the team combined. He also had 59 tackles (25 for loss), four forced fumbles and two fumble recoveries. Veteran defensive lineman Ndamukong Suh was second on the team with 4.5 sacks, while also getting 59 tackles and recovering two fumbles. Pro Bowl linebacker Cory Littleton led the team in total tackles with 125, while also picking up four sacks, three interceptions and blocking two punts. The Rams also had a strong secondary, led by John Johnson (119 tackles and four interceptions), Marcus Peters (three interceptions), Lamarcus Joyner (78 tackles) and Aqib Talib.

=== Playoffs ===
In the playoffs, the Patriots earned a first-round bye as the AFC's second overall seed. In the divisional round, they defeated the Los Angeles Chargers 41–28, scoring touchdowns on five of their first six possessions. Brady passed for 343 yards and a touchdown, while running back Sony Michel rushed for 129 yards and three touchdowns. They then defeated the Kansas City Chiefs 37–31 in the AFC Championship Game, scoring the game-winning touchdown in overtime. The Patriots held a 14–0 lead at halftime, before the Chiefs rallied to take the lead 21–17 in the fourth quarter. From there, both teams took turns taking the lead, until the Chiefs forced overtime with a 39-yard field goal by Harrison Butker to tie the game 31–31. The Patriots won the coin toss to start their offense for overtime, where Rex Burkhead scored a two-yard touchdown to win the game. Michel ended up rushing for a combined total of 242 yards and five touchdowns in the Patriots' two playoff games, setting an NFL record for postseason rushing touchdowns by a rookie. The Patriots defense held Chiefs wide receiver Tyreek Hill and tight end Travis Kelce, who had both gained over 1,300 receiving yards during the season, to a combined total of just four receptions for 65 yards.

Meanwhile, the Rams also had a first-round bye as the NFC's second overall seed. They started off the divisional round by defeating the Dallas Cowboys 30–22. The Rams gained 273 yards on the ground with running backs Todd Gurley and C. J. Anderson rushing for over 100 yards each. They then defeated the New Orleans Saints 26–23 in the NFC Championship Game, scoring a game-winning field goal in overtime. The Saints jumped out to an early 13–0 first quarter lead, before the Rams rallied to close the lead to 13–10 at halftime. In the fourth quarter, Greg Zuerlein tied the game at 20–20, with just over 5 minutes remaining. The Saints moved the ball to the Rams' 13 yard line, but could not gain a first down. On third down, quarterback Drew Brees threw a pass to receiver Tommylee Lewis, who was covered by Nickell Robey-Coleman. Though Robey-Coleman knocked Lewis to the ground early and the pass fell incomplete, the obvious penalty was not called and the Saints' Wil Lutz kicked a 31-yard field goal to take the lead. The Rams took possession and sent the game to overtime with a 48-yard field goal by Greg Zuerlein. Although the Rams lost the coin toss and had to start their defense for overtime, Brees threw an interception on the Saints' first drive and Zuerlein kicked a 57-yard field goal to win the game.

=== Pre-game notes ===
The two franchises previously met in 2001's Super Bowl XXXVI; the Rams at the time were based in St. Louis. However, only one player, Patriots starting quarterback Tom Brady, remained on either roster from that contest. Bill Belichick, the Patriots' head coach in the previous contest, also remained in that position for this game. Super Bowl LIII featured record setting age differences between each team's starting quarterbacks and head coaches, pitting 41-year-old Brady against 24-year-old Jared Goff, as well as 66-year-old Belichick against 33-year-old Sean McVay.

The then-St. Louis Rams won their only prior Super Bowl title in Atlanta, Super Bowl XXXIV, hosted at the now-demolished Georgia Dome in 2000, which was located adjacent to Mercedes-Benz Stadium.

As the designated home team in the annual rotation between AFC and NFC teams, the Rams elected to wear their royal blue and yellow throwback uniforms for the game, which they have previously worn for six home games including a home playoff game during the 2018 season. The Patriots wore their standard white away uniforms.

Gambling establishments had the Patriots as 2 ½ point favorites and projected 56 total points would be scored.

Boston and Los Angeles teams of other professional sports have met in the championship rounds, popularizing the "Beat L.A." chant and the hashtag "#BeatLA". This was the thirteenth meeting between teams from Boston and Los Angeles for a major professional sports championship, the most meetings between any two cities in North American sports. The Boston Celtics and Los Angeles Lakers have contested a record eleven NBA Finals since the Lakers moved from Minneapolis in 1960. Furthermore, Los Angeles Galaxy and New England Revolution have contested three MLS Cups. The Boston Red Sox and Los Angeles Dodgers faced off in the 2018 World Series, and with the Patriots and Rams meeting in Super Bowl LIII, it was only the second time in 50 years that two cities' MLB and NFL teams have competed for the league title in the same season (or calendar year), the first time being in 1969 when the New York Jets and Baltimore Colts competed for Super Bowl III in January 1969 followed by the 1969 World Series featuring the New York Mets and Baltimore Orioles. The Patriots faced another Los Angeles-based team in the same playoffs, the Chargers in the divisional round, en route to their Super Bowl meeting with the Rams.

== Broadcasting ==
=== United States ===
==== Television ====
Super Bowl LIII was broadcast by CBS as part of an annual rotation between the three main broadcast television partners of the NFL. It was the 20th time CBS broadcast the game.

Jim Nantz served as play-by-play announcer and Tony Romo worked his first Super Bowl as color commentator. CBS' coverage utilized a total of 115 cameras, including 8K resolution cameras (for the first time in a U.S. network sports telecast) in the end zones, as well as field-level and "up close" augmented reality graphics (with the latter generated by a wireless, handheld camera).

As with CBS's previous Super Bowl (Super Bowl 50), ESPN Deportes aired a Spanish-language broadcast of the game, the second out of three Super Bowls the network eventually sub-licensed.

===== Advertising =====
With a base price slightly higher than $5 million for a 30-second ad, the cost of commercial time remained even with the previous three events. There were fewer spots sold overall in comparison to the previous Super Bowl; CBS aired more than double the number of promos for its own programming (as well as that of its subscription service CBS All Access) than NBC did at Super Bowl LII. Despite this, Kantar estimated its total revenue to be the third-highest in Super Bowl history, at $382 million.

Perennial Super Bowl advertiser Anheuser-Busch made its largest-ever advertising purchase for a single game, with a total of eight different commercials of various lengths (covering five-and-a-half minutes of airtime) across seven product brands, including three being advertised during the game for the first time. Mercedes-Benz aired a minute long ad for the 2019 A-Class Sedan featuring cameos by Ludacris. Walt Disney Studios Motion Pictures aired a half-minute long Teaser for highly anticipated Avengers: Endgame. CBS rejected an ad from medical cannabis company Acreage Holdings advocating for legalization.

For the first time in its history, the NFL itself won USA Today's Super Bowl Ad Meter survey determining the best commercial aired during the game, with an advertisement launching a campaign celebrating its 100th season.

===== Lead-out programs =====
CBS's lead-out program was the series premiere of the talent competition series The World's Best. After late local programs, CBS also aired a special Sunday-night episode of The Late Show with Stephen Colbert.

===== Ratings =====
Initial overnight Nielsen Ratings measured a 44.9 rating for the game, down 5% from the previous year and the lowest rating for a Super Bowl since Super Bowl XLIII ten years prior. 98.2 million viewers were measured, the fewest since Super Bowl XLII. Jemele Hill of The Atlantic attributed the low ratings "to the game being the lowest-scoring Super Bowl ever, moderate national interest in the Rams, the lingering bad taste from the huge blown call in the NFC Championship Game, and Patriots fatigue". In New Orleans, whose Saints had lost the NFC Championship because of the blown call, ratings were down 51% compared to Super Bowl LII as Louisianans boycotted and refused to watch the game. Outside the Boston market, where the 57.1 overnight rating was the highest among local markets, the highest-rated markets were in Richmond, Virginia and Buffalo, New York (the latter having traditionally high ratings for sporting events and being the home of the Patriots' division rivals the Buffalo Bills); Los Angeles was near the national average. A downturn of approximately 5% was noted during the halftime show. The fewer television viewers did not migrate to online or mobile platforms; viewership online and on mobile only totaled 2.5 million viewers, which was not an appreciable enough change to affect the overall viewership decline. The total viewership including streaming was 100.7 million.

==== Streaming ====
Digitally, this was the first Super Bowl available through CBS's subscription service CBS All Access. The game was also available via the CBS Sports app, CBSSports.com, the Yahoo! Sports app, Tumblr app, the NFL app. The Yahoo! Sports app and Tumblr app streams were part of a long-term deal between then NFL and Verizon Media.

==== Radio ====
The game was broadcast on radio nationally on Westwood One. SiriusXM carried the game in eight languages and hometown broadcasts from Boston's WBZ-FM and Los Angeles's KSPN and KCBS-FM, along with the main feed on Sirius XM NFL Radio.

=== International ===
In Canada, the game was aired by CTV, CTV 2 and TSN. Unifor purchased time on the Canadian broadcast to air an attack ad criticizing General Motors' decision to close the Oshawa Car Assembly plant, defying demands from the company to pull the ad because they deemed it to be misleading.

In Australia and New Zealand, ESPN Australia aired an ESPN-produced broadcast of the game that featured the Monday Night Football commentary crew of Joe Tessitore, Jason Witten and Booger McFarland (McFarland was in the booth rather than the Booger Mobile, the controversial sideline vehicle he used that was abandoned before the end of the 2018 MNF season). It would prove to be Witten's last commentary appearance for the time being, due to his unretirement and return to the Dallas Cowboys. Additionally in Australia the game was broadcast for the second year in a row by Melbourne Radio Station 1116 SEN and commentated by Gerard Whateley.

In the United Kingdom and Ireland, the game was broadcast on the free-to-air channel BBC One, and paid-subscription channels Sky Sports Main Event, Sky Sports Mix and Sky Sports USA.

== Entertainment ==
The musical artists who agreed to perform at the show—including Gladys Knight, Maroon 5, Travis Scott, and Big Boi—were criticized by media outlets, other artists and members of the public for performing at Super Bowl LIII because of the NFL's alleged blacklisting of Colin Kaepernick for protesting police brutality by kneeling during the pre-game national anthem. Several artists, including Jay-Z and Cardi B, turned down offers to perform at the game in support of Kaepernick.

Quinton Peron and Napoleon Jinnies became the first male cheerleaders to perform at a major US sporting event. Scott Winer was the first openly gay cameraman to film the Super Bowl.

=== Pre-game ===
The NFL had Mercedes-Benz Stadium's retractable roof open for the pre-game ceremonies and closed it prior to kickoff.

Atlanta natives Chloe x Halle performed "America the Beautiful". Gladys Knight, also from Atlanta, performed "The Star-Spangled Banner". D.C. resident Aarron Loggins performed a sign-language interpretation for both songs. The anthem was concluded with a flyover by the U.S. Air Force Thunderbirds demonstration team in their custom painted F-16C Fighting Falcons flying from Dobbins Air Reserve Base in Marietta, Georgia.

Bernice King—the daughter of Martin Luther King Jr.—and civil rights movement leaders Andrew Young and John Lewis participated in the coin toss ceremony. King had the honors of flipping the coin.

=== Halftime show ===
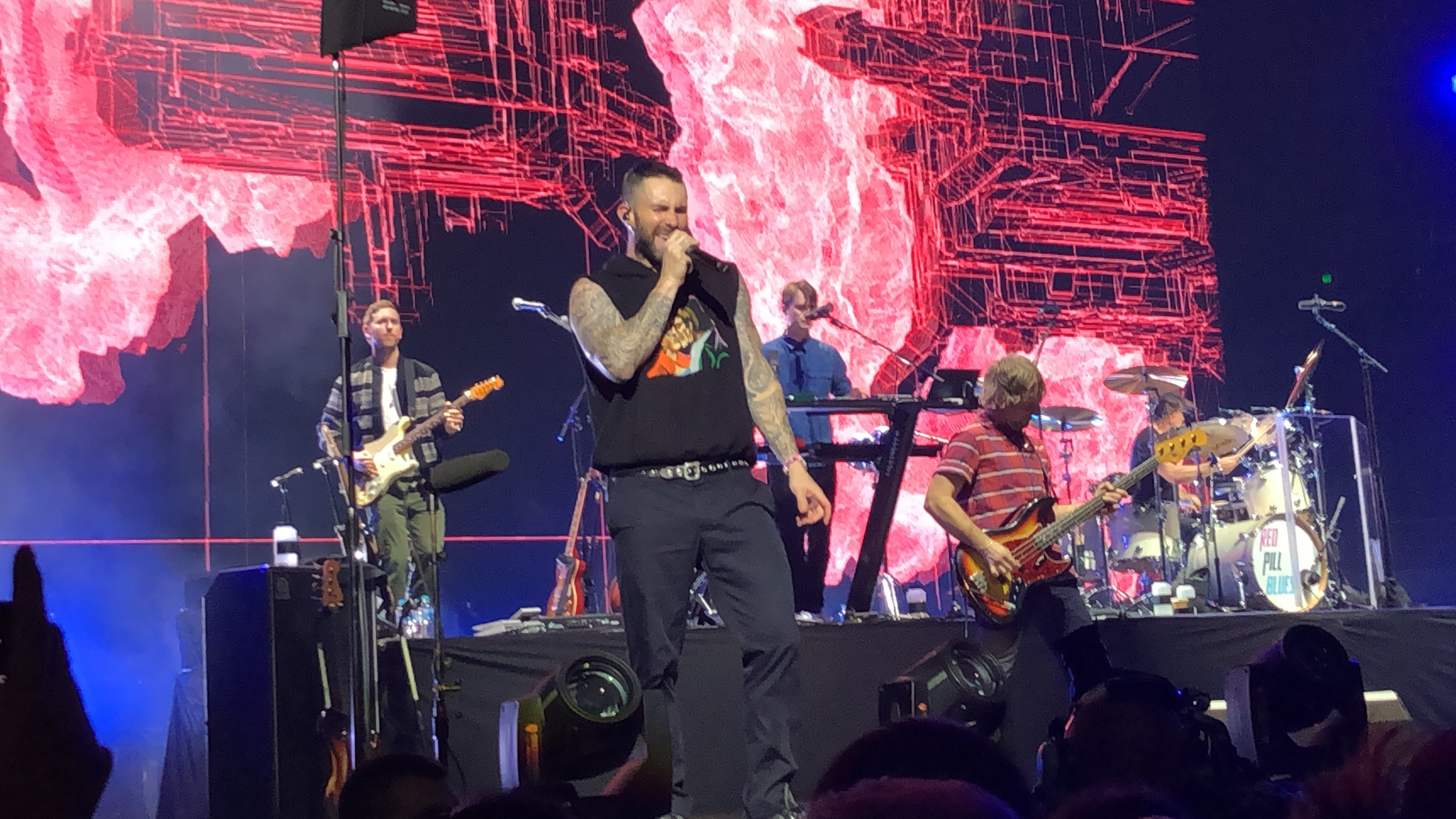
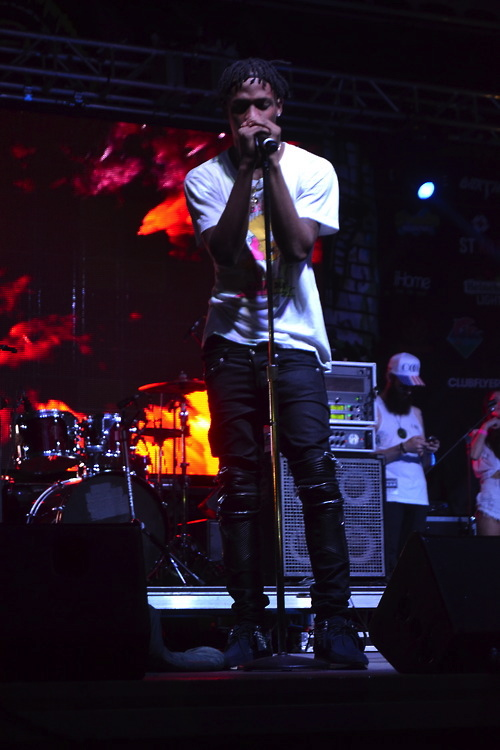
Maroon 5 headlined the halftime show, while Travis Scott made a guest appearance

On January 13, 2019, the NFL announced that pop band Maroon 5 would headline the Super Bowl LIII halftime show. They were joined by Big Boi of Outkast and Travis Scott as guests. A short clip featuring the cast of SpongeBob SquarePants and a clip from the 2001 episode "Band Geeks" was aired as a tribute to series creator Stephen Hillenburg, who died in November 2018 due to amyotrophic lateral sclerosis (ALS). The full clip of the "Sweet Victory" song, including a dedication to Hillenburg, was played inside the stadium prior to the game.

== Game summary ==
=== First half ===
The Patriots received first possession as wide receiver Cordarrelle Patterson returned the opening kickoff 38 yards to his own 39-yard line and the team picked up 27 yards with their next five plays. On quarterback Tom Brady's first pass attempt of the day, cornerback Nickell Robey-Coleman, who was notable for a non-call on pass interference in the NFC Championship two weeks earlier, deflected a pass intended for wide receiver Chris Hogan, allowing linebacker Cory Littleton to make an interception, setting the Rams up at their own 27-yard line. The turnover had no avail, as the Patriots forced a three-and-out and the game's first punt. New England drove 60 yards in 11 plays, the longest a 19-yard catch by tight end Rob Gronkowski. The drive stalled at the Los Angeles 28-yard line, where kicker Stephen Gostkowski missed a 46-yard field goal attempt wide left, still keeping the game scoreless. Two plays later, the Rams picked up a first down at the New England 49-yard line but were again unable to move the ball beyond that point and again, the Patriots threatened to score when Brady completed a 25-yard pass to wide receiver Julian Edelman at the Rams 45-yard line. On the next play, Brady was strip-sacked by Rams defensive end John Franklin-Myers, but Patriots center David Andrews recovered the fumble. However, the team was only able to get as far as the Los Angeles 40 before fourth down and had to punt with 18 seconds left in the first quarter.

After forcing another three-and-out to start the second quarter, the Patriots managed to drive 39 yards in seven plays, most of which came from another 25-yard completion from Brady to Edelman. Gostkowski finished the possession with a 42-yard field goal, giving New England a 3–0 lead with 10:29 left in the half. After the next three drives ended in punts, the Patriots took the ball and drove 36 yards to the Rams 32-yard line. New England elected to go for a 4th-and-1 conversion instead of a field goal, but Brady's pass to Gronkowski was broken up by Littleton and safety John Johnson, turning the ball over on downs with 1:13 left in the half. Los Angeles could not get the ball past midfield, so they punted it back to New England to end the half.

The two teams went into their locker rooms with the Patriots leading, 3–0, the second lowest halftime score in Super Bowl history and the lowest since the 2–0 halftime score in Super Bowl IX after the 1974 season. In the entire first half, the Rams had gained just 57 yards and two first downs, both record lows for coach Sean McVay. This was also the first time that McVay's Rams had ever been shut out in a first half.

=== Second half ===
The defensive duel continued into the second half as both teams punted twice (one of them was a Super Bowl record 65-yard punt by the Rams' Johnny Hekker). With 6:33 left in the third quarter, the Rams opened their first drive of more than five plays and their first not to end in a punt, moving the ball 42 yards in 10 plays. On the third play of the drive, Rams quarterback Jared Goff completed a 15-yard pass to wide receiver Brandin Cooks and later made his first third-down conversion with an 18-yard pass to wide receiver Robert Woods on 3rd-and-6. On 3rd-and-7 from the Patriots' 26-yard line, Goff was sacked for a 9-yard loss by Patriots linebacker Dont'a Hightower, but Rams kicker Greg Zuerlein was able to kick a 53-yard field goal, the second-longest in Super Bowl history, to tie the game at 3–3 with 2:11 left in the third quarter. It would be their only score. The Patriots took the ball back and drove to the Los Angeles 44-yard line but could not go any further and had to punt on the second play of the fourth quarter. For the first time in Super Bowl history, both teams had gone three quarters without scoring a touchdown.

After forcing the Rams to punt, the Patriots mounted the longest drive of the game as Brady completed an 18-yard pass to Gronkowski, a 13-yard pass to Edelman, a 7-yard pass to running back Rex Burkhead and a 29-yard pass to Gronkowski, bringing them to the Los Angeles 2-yard line. Running back Sony Michel finished the drive with a 2-yard touchdown run for the game's only touchdown, extending his rookie postseason rushing touchdown record to six and giving New England a 10–3 lead with 7 minutes left in regulation. On the first play of Los Angeles' next drive, Goff completed a 19-yard pass to Cooks and later converted a 3rd-and-9 with an 11-yard throw to wide receiver Josh Reynolds. On the next play, his 17-yard completion to Woods moved the ball to the New England 27-yard line. However, on the next play, Goff's potential game-tying touchdown pass to Cooks was broken up by cornerback Stephon Gilmore and safety Duron Harmon, and then Goff threw another pass intended for Cooks that was intercepted by Gilmore on the 3-yard line with 4:17 remaining.

The Rams needed to force a punt or turnover; however, they were unable to contain the Patriots on the ground. On the second play of New England's possession, Michel stormed through the line for a 26-yard run. After he picked up 9 more yards with his next two carries, Burkhead's 26-yard run gave the Patriots a first down on the Los Angeles 33-yard line. Three plays later, Gostkowski succeeded on a 41-yard field goal, giving the Patriots a 13–3 lead with 1:12 left on the clock. Taking the ball back on their own 25, Goff completed a 10-yard pass to Woods, as well as completions to Cooks for gains of 24 and 21 yards, moving the ball to the Patriots' 30-yard line. With eight seconds left, the Rams decided to kick a 48-yard field goal, which would have been followed by an onside kick attempt, but Zuerlein missed the attempt wide left, securing the Patriots' sixth Super Bowl title.

=== Totals ===
Brady completed 21 of 35 passes for 262 yards, with one interception. Edelman was his top target with 10 receptions for 141 yards, while Gronkowski made six receptions for 87 yards in his final game with the Patriots. Michel was the top rusher of the game with 94 yards and a touchdown. Gilmore had five solo tackles and an interception. Goff finished the day 19-for-38 passing, for 229 yards and an interception. Cooks was his top receiver with eight receptions for 120 yards. Littleton had 10 tackles (six solo) and an interception. Hekker punted nine times for 417 yards, an average of 46.3 yards per punt, and put five punts inside the 20. The Rams were only the second team in Super Bowl history to not score a touchdown, the first having been the Miami Dolphins in Super Bowl VI after the 1971 season.

Brady became the first player in NFL history to win six Super Bowls, surpassing Charles Haley's only NFL record of five. Brady, also, at age 41, became the oldest quarterback to win and appear in a Super Bowl (although he did not play, the oldest quarterback ever to appear in a Super Bowl was Steve DeBerg in Super Bowl XXXIII at the age of 45), and, at the time, Bill Belichick was the oldest coach to win a Super Bowl, at age 66, until Bruce Arians surpassed that record at age 68 in Super Bowl LV. Edelman was named the Super Bowl Most Valuable Player, and he was the first wide receiver to win the award since Santonio Holmes in Super Bowl XLIII after the 2008 season. Despite holding the Rams to just three points, no Patriots defender received a vote.

=== Box score ===
New England Patriots vs. Los Angeles Rams – Game summary

| Quarter | 1 | 2 | 3 | 4 | Total |
|---|---|---|---|---|---|
| Patriots (AFC) | 0 | 3 | 0 | 10 | 13 |
| Rams (NFC) | 0 | 0 | 3 | 0 | 3 |

at Mercedes-Benz Stadium, Atlanta, Georgia

- Date: February 3, 2019
- Game time: 6:32 p.m. EST
- Game weather: Played indoors (retractable roof closed)
- Game attendance: 70,081
- Referee: John Parry
- TV announcers (CBS): Jim Nantz, Tony Romo, Tracy Wolfson, Gene Steratore, Evan Washburn and Jay Feely
- Recap, Gamebook

Scoring summary

| Quarter | Time | Drive | | | Team | Scoring information | Score | |
| Quarter | Time | Plays | Yards | TOP | Team | Scoring information | NE | LAR |
|---|---|---|---|---|---|---|---|---|
| 2 | 10:29 | 7 | 39 | 3:29 | NE | 42-yard field goal by Stephen Gostkowski | 3 | 0 |
| 3 | 2:11 | 10 | 42 | 4:22 | LAR | 53-yard field goal by Greg Zuerlein | 3 | 3 |
| 4 | 7:00 | 5 | 69 | 2:49 | NE | Sony Michel 2-yard touchdown run, Gostkowski kick good | 10 | 3 |
| 4 | 1:12 | 9 | 72 | 3:05 | NE | 41-yard field goal by Gostkowski | 13 | 3 |
| "TOP" = time of possession. For other American football terms, see Glossary of American football. | | | | | | | 13 | 3 |

== Final statistics ==
=== Statistical comparison ===
| Statistic | New England Patriots | Los Angeles Rams |
|---|---|---|
| First downs | 22 | 14 |
| First downs rushing | 6 | 2 |
| First downs passing | 12 | 11 |
| First downs penalty | 4 | 1 |
| Third down efficiency | 3/12 | 3/13 |
| Fourth down efficiency | 0/1 | 0/0 |
| Total net yards | 407 | 260 |
| Net yards rushing | 154 | 62 |
| Rushing attempts | 32 | 18 |
| Yards per rush | 4.8 | 3.4 |
| Yards passing | 253 | 198 |
| Passing–completions/attempts | 21/35 | 19/38 |
| Times sacked–total yards | 1–9 | 4–31 |
| Interceptions thrown | 1 | 1 |
| Punt returns–total yards | 2–2 | 2–12 |
| Kickoff returns–total yards | 1–38 | 1–27 |
| Interceptions–total return yards | 1–0 | 1–0 |
| Punts–average yardage | 5–43 | 9–46.3 |
| Fumbles–lost | 1–0 | 1–0 |
| Penalties–yards | 3–20 | 9–65 |
| Time of possession | 33:10 | 26:50 |
| Turnovers | 1 | 1 |

Records set (Unless noted as "NFL Championships," all records refer only to Super Bowls)
| Most appearances, team | 11 | New England Patriots |
| Fewest points scored, winning team | 13 | New England Patriots |
| Most consecutive drives ending with a punt | 8 | Los Angeles Rams |
| Fewest touchdowns, first 3 quarters (both teams) | 0 | Super Bowl LIII |
| Fewest touchdowns (both teams, game) | 1 | Super Bowl LIII |
| Fewest PATs (both teams, game) | 1 | Super Bowl LIII |
| Fewest kickoff returns (both teams, game) | 2 | Super Bowl LIII |
| Fewest points, first 3 quarters (both teams) | 6 | Super Bowl LIII |
| Fewest points (both teams, game) | 16 | Super Bowl LIII |
| Most appearances, player | 9 | Tom Brady (New England) |
| Most appearances, starting player | 9 | Tom Brady (New England) |
| Most wins, player | 6 | Tom Brady (New England) |
| Most pass attempts, player (career) | 392 | Tom Brady (New England) |
| Most pass completions, player (career) | 256 | Tom Brady (New England) |
| Most passing yards, player (career) | 2,838 | Tom Brady (New England) |
| Oldest quarterback, player | 41 years, 183 days | Tom Brady (New England) |
| Oldest quarterback, starting player | 41 years, 183 days | Tom Brady (New England) |
| Oldest quarterback to win | 41 years, 183 days | Tom Brady (New England) |
| Most appearances, head coach | 9 | Bill Belichick (New England) |
| Most appearances, coach | 12 | Bill Belichick (New England) |
| Most appearances, any capacity | 12 | Bill Belichick (New England) |
| Most won, head coach | 6 | Bill Belichick (New England) |
| Most won, coach | 8 | Bill Belichick (New England) |
| Most won, any capacity | 8 | Bill Belichick (New England) |
| Oldest head coach, winning team | 66 years, 293 days | Bill Belichick (New England) |
| Most appearances, kicker | 6 | Stephen Gostkowski (New England) |
| Most receptions, tight end (career) | 23 | Rob Gronkowski (New England) |
| Youngest head coach | 33 years, 10 days | Sean McVay (Los Angeles) |
| Longest punt | 65 yards | Johnny Hekker (Los Angeles) |
Records tied
| Most wins, team | 6 | New England Patriots |
| Most first downs by penalty, team | 4 | New England Patriots |
| Fewest touchdowns scored, winning team | 1 | New England Patriots |
| Fewest points, first half | 0 | Los Angeles Rams |
| Fewest points scored, team | 3 | Los Angeles Rams |
| Fewest touchdowns scored, team | 0 | Los Angeles Rams |
| Fewest points, first quarter (both teams) | 0 | Super Bowl LIII |
| Fewest passing touchdowns (both teams) | 0 | Super Bowl LIII |
| Fewest fumbles lost (both teams) | 0 | Super Bowl LIII |
| Most NFL championships won, head coach | 6 | Bill Belichick (New England) |
| Most NFL championships won, player | 6 | Tom Brady (New England) |
| Most receptions, first half | 7 | Julian Edelman (New England) |
| Most field goals, career | 7 | Stephen Gostkowski (New England) |

=== Individual statistics ===
Patriots passing
| | C/ATT | Yds | TD | INT | Rating |
|---|---|---|---|---|---|
| Tom Brady | 21/35 | 262 | 0 | 1 | 71.4 |
Patriots rushing
| | Car | Yds | TD | Lg | Yds/Car |
| Sony Michel | 18 | 94 | 1 | 26 | 5.2 |
| Rex Burkhead | 7 | 43 | 0 | 26 | 6.1 |
| Julian Edelman | 1 | 8 | 0 | 8 | 8.0 |
| Cordarrelle Patterson | 2 | 7 | 0 | 6 | 3.5 |
| James White | 2 | 4 | 0 | 3 | 2.0 |
| Tom Brady | 2 | −2 | 0 | −1 | –1.0 |
Patriots receiving
| | Rec | Yds | TD | Lg | Target |
| Julian Edelman | 10 | 141 | 0 | 27 | 12 |
| Rob Gronkowski | 6 | 87 | 0 | 29 | 7 |
| Rex Burkhead | 2 | 15 | 0 | 8 | 2 |
| Cordarrelle Patterson | 2 | 14 | 0 | 9 | 2 |
| James White | 1 | 5 | 0 | 5 | 4 |
| Chris Hogan | 0 | 0 | 0 | 0 | 6 |
| Sony Michel | 0 | 0 | 0 | 0 | 2 |

Rams passing
| | C/ATT | Yds | TD | INT | Rating |
|---|---|---|---|---|---|
| Jared Goff | 19/38 | 229 | 0 | 1 | 57.9 |
Rams rushing
| | Car | Yds | TD | Lg | Yds/Car |
| Todd Gurley | 10 | 35 | 0 | 16 | 3.5 |
| C. J. Anderson | 7 | 22 | 0 | 5 | 3.1 |
| Robert Woods | 1 | 5 | 0 | 5 | 5.0 |
Rams receiving
| | Rec | Yds | TD | Lg | Target |
| Brandin Cooks | 8 | 120 | 0 | 24 | 13 |
| Robert Woods | 5 | 70 | 0 | 18 | 10 |
| Josh Reynolds | 3 | 28 | 0 | 11 | 7 |
| C. J. Anderson | 2 | 12 | 0 | 9 | 3 |
| Todd Gurley | 1 | −1 | 0 | −1 | 2 |
| Gerald Everett | 0 | 0 | 0 | 0 | 1 |

== Starting lineups ==
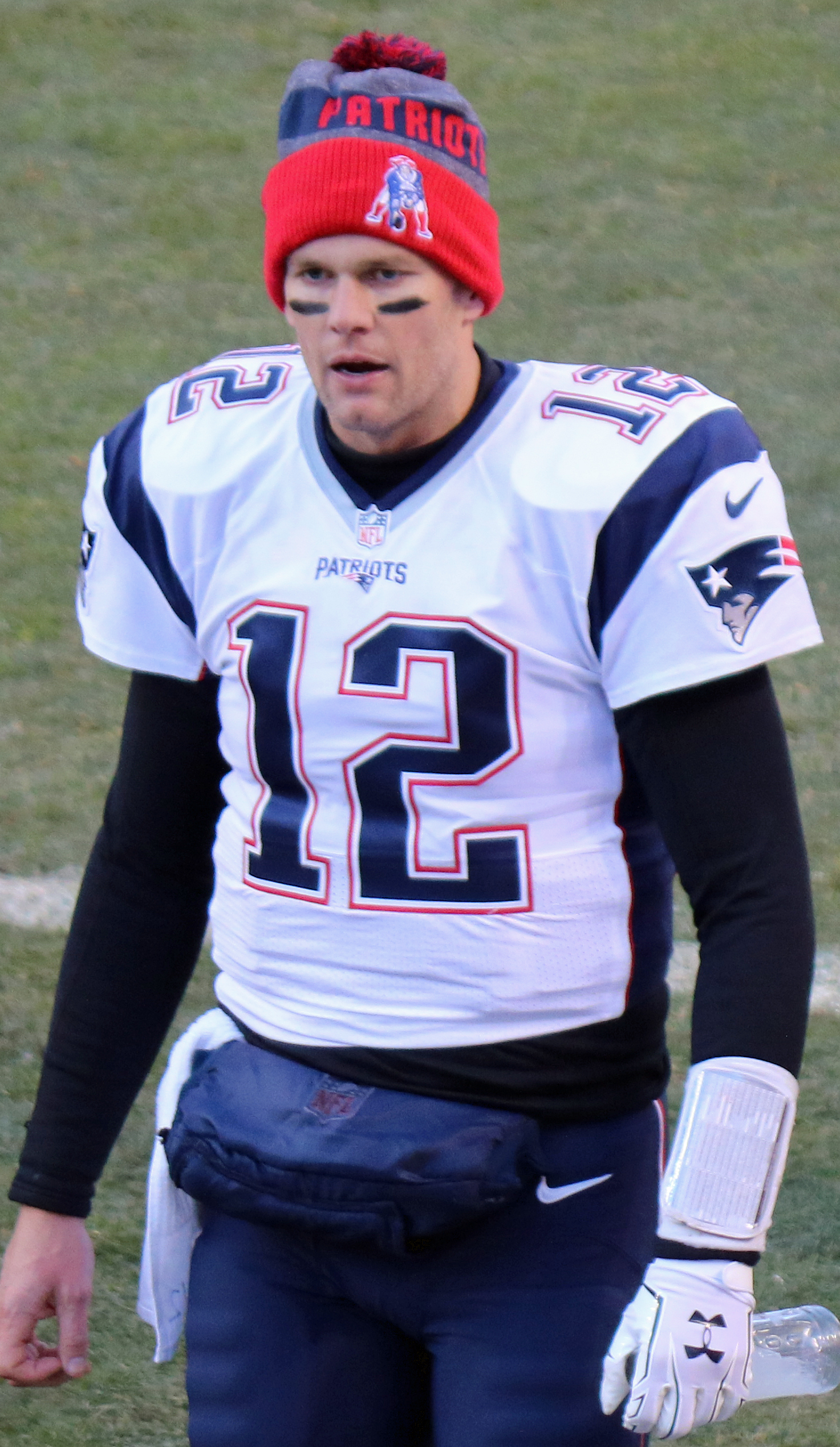
Patriots starting quarterback Tom Brady became the oldest to win the Super Bowl and the first player to win six

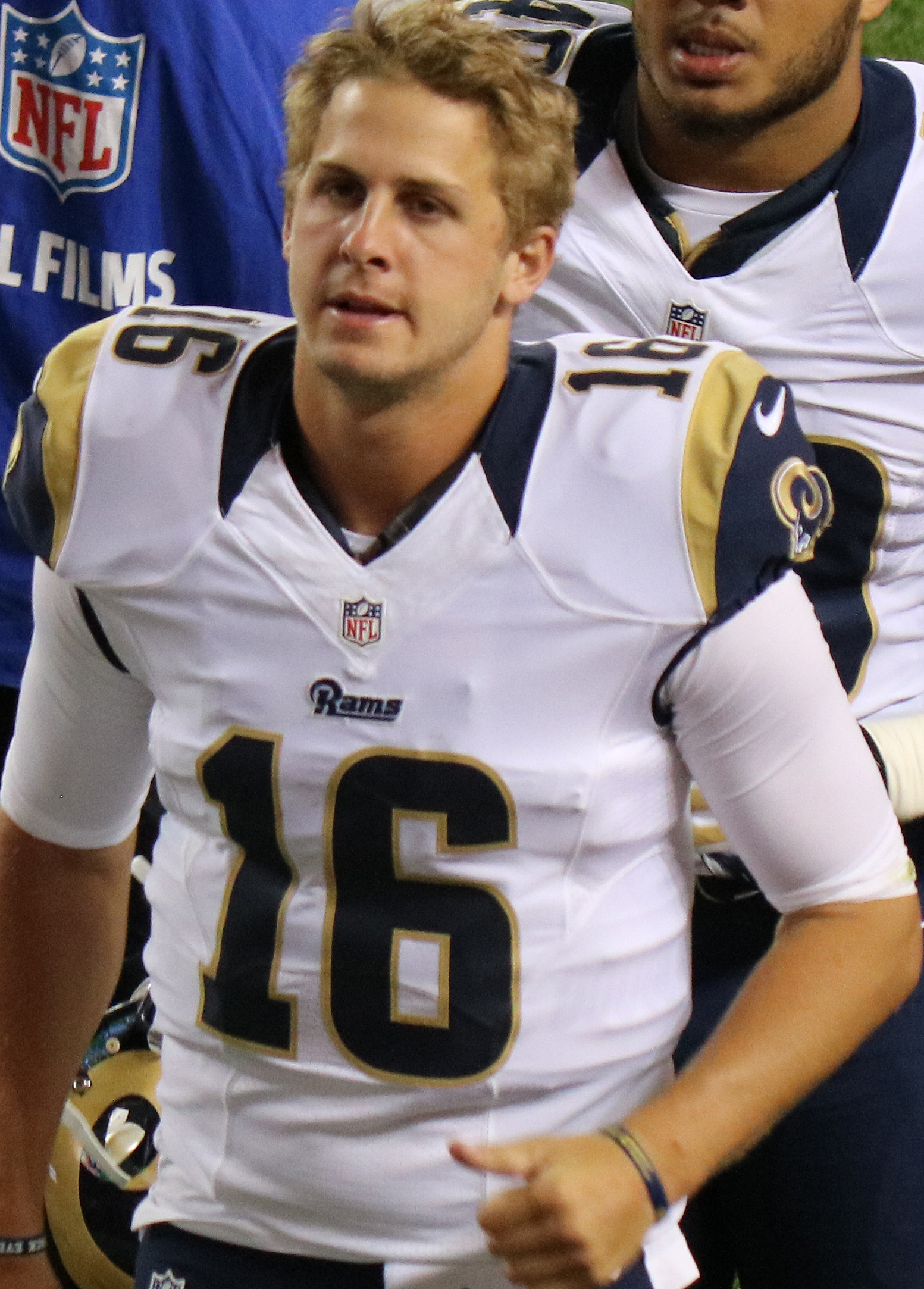
Rams starting quarterback Jared Goff reached Super Bowl LIII in his third season

| New England | Position | Position | Los Angeles |
Offense
| Chris Hogan | WR | | Josh Reynolds |
| Julian Edelman | WR | | Robert Woods |
| Trent Brown | LT | | Andrew Whitworth |
| Joe Thuney | LG | | Rodger Saffold |
| David Andrews | C | | John Sullivan |
| Shaq Mason | RG | | Austin Blythe |
| Marcus Cannon | RT | | Rob Havenstein |
| Rob Gronkowski | TE | | Tyler Higbee |
| Tom Brady | QB | | Jared Goff |
| Sony Michel | RB | HB | Todd Gurley |
| James Develin | FB | WR | Brandin Cooks |
Defense
| Deatrich Wise Jr. | RE | DE | Michael Brockers |
| Malcom Brown | DT | NT | Ndamukong Suh |
| Lawrence Guy | DT | | Aaron Donald |
| Trey Flowers | LE | WILL | Dante Fowler |
| Kyle Van Noy | LB | OLB | Samson Ebukam |
| Dont'a Hightower | LB | ILB | Cory Littleton |
| Stephon Gilmore | RCB | ILB | Mark Barron |
| Jonathan Jones | DB | SS | John Johnson |
| Devin McCourty | S | FS | Lamarcus Joyner |
| Patrick Chung | S | CB | Aqib Talib |
| Jason McCourty | LCB | CB | Marcus Peters |

== Officials ==
Super Bowl LIII had seven officials. The numbers in parentheses below indicate their uniform numbers. John Parry became the second referee in a row to retire after officiating the Super Bowl after Gene Steratore, who retired after Super Bowl LII.

- Referee: John Parry (132)
- Umpire: Fred Bryan (11)
- Down judge: Ed Camp (134)
- Line judge: Jeff Bergman (32)
- Field judge: Steve Zimmer (33)
- Side judge: Eugene Hall (103)
- Back judge: Terrence Miles (111)
- Replay official: Jim Lapetina
- Replay assistant: Chad Adams
- Alternate referee: Ron Torbert (62)
- Alternate umpire: Mark Pellis (131)
- Alternate wing: Tom Stephan (68)
- Alternate deep: Michael Banks (72)
- Alternate back judge: Rich Martinez (39)

== Aftermath ==
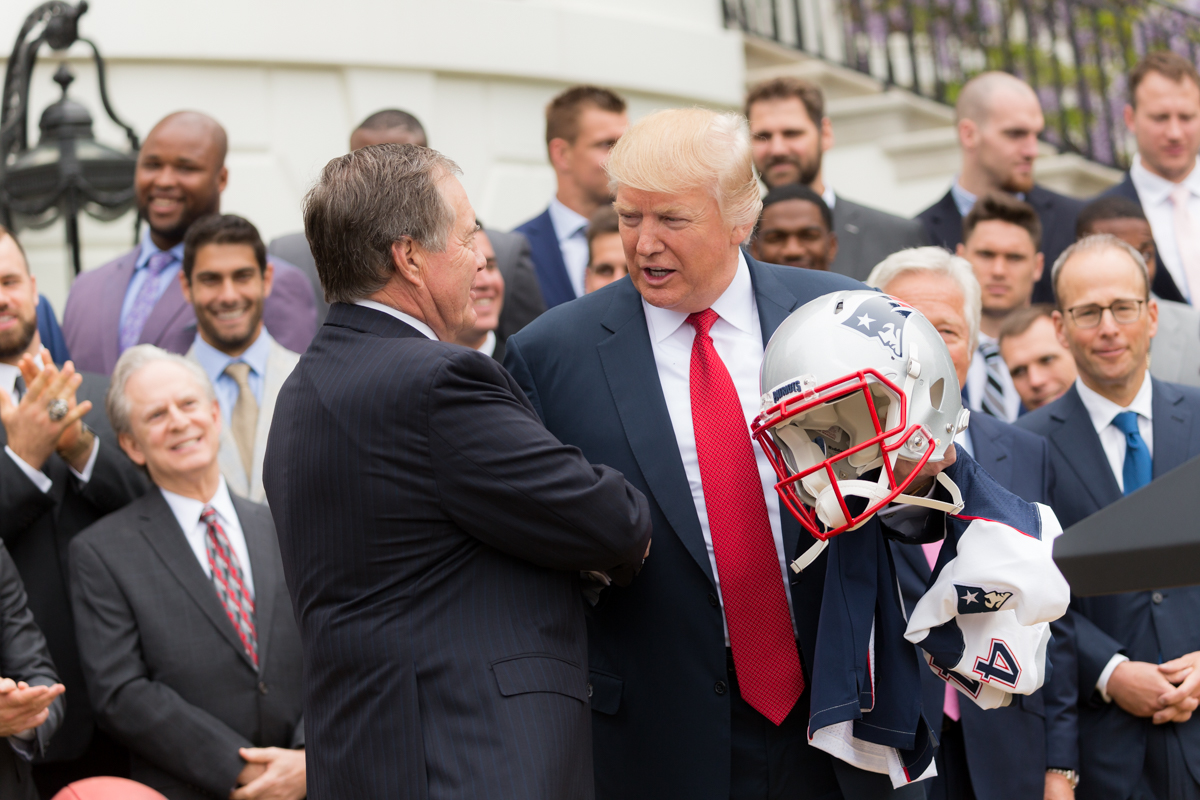
Bill Belichick and the Patriots with President Donald Trump

=== Patriots ===
On the morning of February 5, the Patriots celebration duck boat parade was held in Boston, starting at Boylston Street and ending at City Hall Plaza. The date of the parade was unseasonably warm for New England. The high temperature for the day was 65 degrees Fahrenheit, with a low of 40. Temperatures in Boston during this time of year average in the mid to low 40's. It was attended by an estimated 1.5 million fans.

Rob Gronkowski, the team's star tight end, announced his retirement on March 24, 2019.

Catalyzed by their defense's historically dominant play, the Patriots started the season extremely well at 8–0 for the third time in franchise history, and early on there was conversation as to if they could repeat the undefeated 2007 regular season. However, their winning streak would soon end as a result of their Week 9 loss to the Baltimore Ravens. The proceeded to finish the season by winning 4 games and losing three more times. The Patriots won the AFC East for the 11th straight season, but they were upset by the Tennessee Titans in the Wild Card game, their first Wild Card game since the 2009 season. This marked the first time the Patriots lost a home postseason game since the 2012 AFC Championship Game where they lost to the later Super Bowl champion Ravens 28–13, and the first time the Patriots failed to reach the AFC Championship Game since 2010.

The loss to Tennessee was also Tom Brady's last game with the team, as he announced he was entering free agency and later signed with the Tampa Bay Buccaneers on March 20, 2020. Gronkowski would come out of retirement to play with Brady in 2020 and the two would win Super Bowl LV, which was Brady's seventh ring. In Super Bowl LV, they set the record for most playoff touchdowns for a QB and pass catcher.

The Patriots did not make another Super Bowl until Super Bowl LX in 2026 (the 2025 NFL season), a game they lost to the Seattle Seahwks. By this point they were coached by former player Mike Vrabel, who was Tennessee's head coach in 2019 when they defeated the Patriots in Brady's last game. Two years prior to Vrabel's hiring, Belichick and the Patriots parted ways after 24 seasons. Belichick returned to coaching, but not in the NFL, as he became the head coach for the North Carolina Tar Heels NCAA football team.

=== Rams ===
The Rams regressed as a team the following two seasons, going a cumulative 19–13 over that time, missing the playoffs in 2019 and making it in as a wild card in 2020. In particular, quarterback Jared Goff saw his play worsen over this time. Goff was effectively benched at the start of the Los Angeles Rams' 2020 NFC Wild Card playoff game against the Seattle Seahawks in January 2021. While recovering from thumb surgery, Goff was replaced by John Wolford but had to enter the game early after Wolford suffered a neck injury.

This led to the Rams trading Goff and draft picks to the Lions for Matthew Stafford. In 2021, the Rams went 12–5 and won the NFC West, highlighted by the strength of All-Pro players Cooper Kupp (who missed Super LIII due to injury), Aaron Donald, and Jalen Ramsey, with the addition of Stafford proving to be the right fit for the team. The Rams advanced to the Super Bowl, played at their home venue Sofi Stadium, and won the game over the Cincinnati Bengals, 23–20. It was their first Super Bowl win in Los Angeles.
