= Aarron Loggins =

American deaf performer, activist, and actor

Aarron Loggins (born January 9, 1985) is an American deaf performer, activist, and actor. He uses English and American Sign Language and worked on The C-Word, Shock Nation, Warriors of the Red Ribbon and In Good Hands. In 2019, Loggins performed the National Anthem and America the Beautiful at Super Bowl LIII in American Sign Language alongside singer Gladys Knight.

== Early life and education ==
Loggins was born on January 9, 1985, in Joliet, Illinois. He moved to Washington, DC, after graduating from Joliet Central High School. He then attended Gallaudet University. He graduated in 2008 with a Bachelor's degree in Theater Arts.

Loggins is a member of Phi Beta Sigma fraternity and the Most Worshipful Prince Hall Grand Lodge (Widow's Son #0007).

He was the Mister Deaf International of 2014.

== Television ==
Title	Role
For My Man	FBI Investigator/Buddy Friend
Evil Stepmother	Police Officer
Brida Killa	Ron
Evil Twin	Extra
For My Woman	Detective

== Theatre ==
Title	Role
Party On: Romeo and Juliet	Himself
Reach To Unreachable Star	Leading
Who's Tommy	Cousin Kevin
Sheldon of DC	Sheldon
Sense-able	Himself
Sign Language	Benny
Visible Language	Ennals Adams
Fences	Lyons
Z: A Christmas Story	Joseph

== Filmography ==
Title	Role
TED Talks: Why We Need You to Advocate for Universal Closed Captioning	Himself
Warriors of the Red Ribbon	Dr. Jonas Daly/Akar
Andrew Foster: Seeds of Hope	Dr. Gabriel Adepoju
The Burlesques Lounge	Joseph
In Good Hands	Tyler
How to Get Girls	Extra
The Helpful President	Guest appearance

== Webisode ==
Title	Role
C-Words	Tahj
Shock Nation	Student
