= Byrdie Bell =

American actress and model

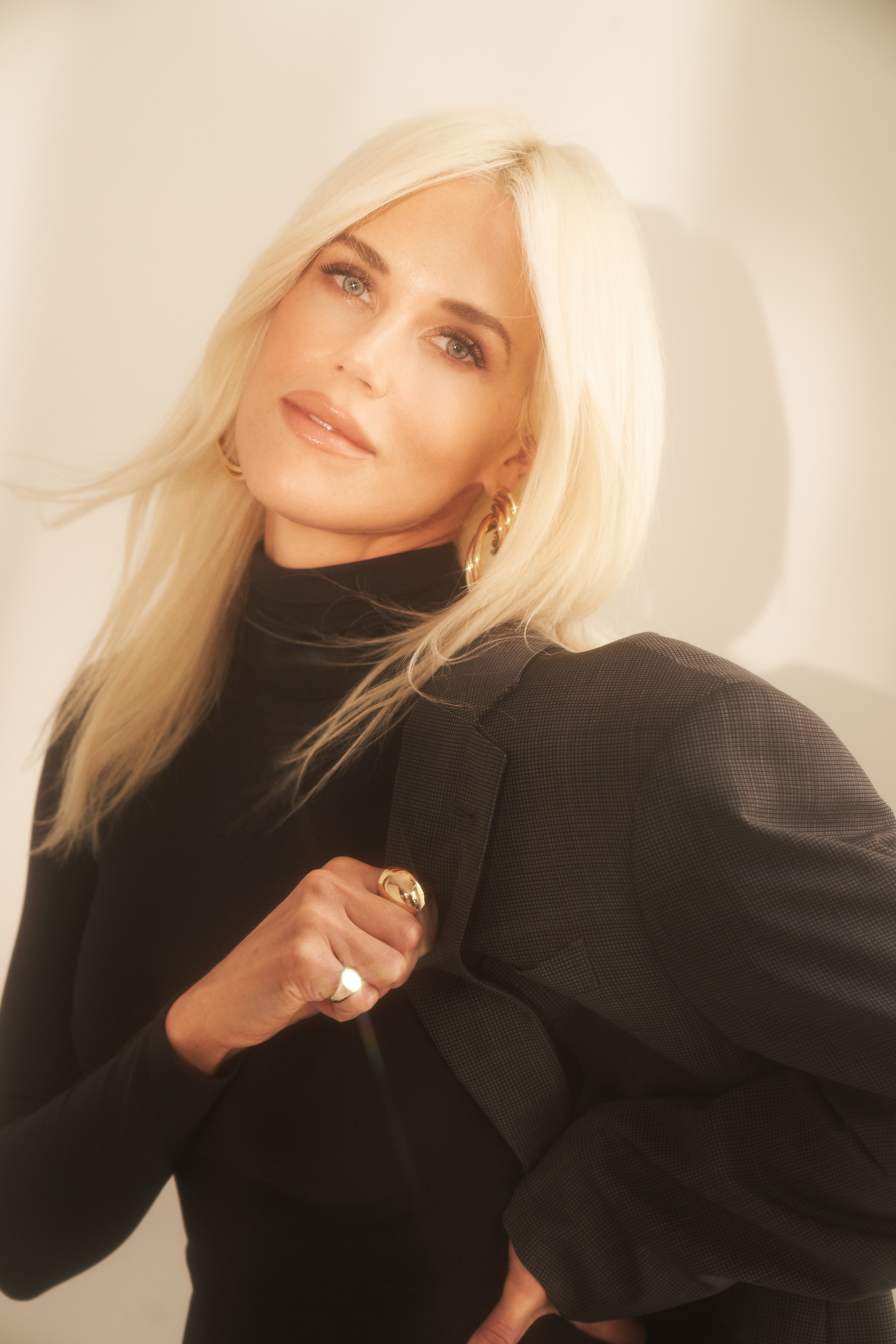
- Bell in 2023
- Born: Evelyn Byrd Bell; August 13, 1985 (age 40); Chicago
- Occupations: actress and model

Byrdie Bell (born Evelyn Byrd Bell on March 13, 1985) is an American actress and model.

== Early life, education, and family ==
Evelyn Byrd Bell was born in Chicago. She attended Greenwich Country Day School in Greenwich, Connecticut and the United Nations International School in New York City. After studying at HB Studio in New York City and the British American Drama Academy in London, Bell graduated from the Stella Adler Conservatory program.

Bell is a descendant of Colonel William Byrd II, the founder of Richmond, Virginia. Her mother, Evelyn Lorentzen Bell, is the great granddaughter of Øivind Lorentzen whose son, Erling Lorentzen, was related through marriage to the Norwegian royal family.

Her father Ted Bell was the Vice Chairman of the Board and Creative Director of Young & Rubicam, one of the world's largest advertising agencies.

== Career ==
In 2009, Bell was hired as an actor on HaAh HaGadol 2, the Israeli version of the reality show Big Brother in a strategic attempt to confuse the competing cast. She had a small part in Martin Scorsese's Rolling Stones documentary Shine a Light. Bell had wanted to release two independent films; Blinders (with Nathaniel Brown and Luke Worrall) and Tragic Fairytale in 2011 but they were not purchased.

At age eighteen, Bell began modeling. She has appeared in the pages of magazines including Vogue, V Magazine, Harper's Bazaar, Paper Planes, and Dossier Journal.

In 2010, she was recognized in The New York Times "Nifty 50" as one of America's top 50 up-and-coming talents.

She has modeled in campaigns for Hogan, NAHM, Rad Hourani, Meredith Kahn, Bloomingdale's, and Club Monaco.

In September 2011, Bell became a featured editor for Piperlime.
