= Miss & Mister Deaf International =

Beauty pageant

- MMDI
- Awarded for: International Beauty pageant
- Location: Las Vegas
- Country: United States
- Hosted by: Bonita Ann Leek
- Formerly called: Miss Deaf International (MDI)
- Preshow host: Jose Alvarado
- First award: 2010
- Winner(s): ♀ (Botswana) Kemmonye Mamatsits (2019) ♂ (India) Ajith Kumar (2019)

Highlights
- Miss Deaf International 2010: ♀ (France) Julie Abbou (2010)
- Website: missmisterdeafinternational.org

Miss & Mister Deaf International (MMDI) is an international beauty pageant which crowns young Deaf women to "Miss Deaf International" and young Deaf men to "Mister Deaf International" every year.

== History ==
MMDI is a Nonprofit organization which was created in February 2010. The Chief executive officer of pageant is Bonita Ann Leek,

In 2005, Leek founded the Miss Deaf USA (MDU) contest in Las Vegas, Nevada. In the early 2005, she was told about the Miss Deaf World pageant, which was held in Prague, the Czech Republic. The Miss Deaf USA 2005 winner was the first USA participant in this competition. As MDU's CEO, Leek attended the event and met pageant directors from other countries, who expressed their will to initiate a similar pageant in the US as well as in other countries. In the spring of 2009, Deaf Nation, granted Miss Deaf International (MDI) a permission to host its international event in conjunction with the Deaf World Expo in July 2010. On July 31, 2010, Julie Abbou from France won Miss Deaf International 2010 in Las Vegas. On June 18, 2012, Abbou won again the second vice Miss Ile de France 2012.

From the experience in 2010, Miss Deaf International added three continental pageants: Miss Deaf Europe, Miss Deaf South America, and Miss Deaf Asia. MDI international coordinator, Kasia Galasiewicz, recruited Deaf ladies from all over the world to participate in Orlando, Florida in July 2011. During the meeting in Orlando, MDI agreed to include a Mister Deaf International pageant, and its name was changed into Miss & Mister Deaf International Inc. In July 2012, MMDI 2012 was held in Ankara, Turkey, and the Ankara Deaf Club volunteers made the pageant possible.

The contestants from the world advanced their personal, educational, career, and humanitarian goals, as well as the lives and goals of others. Following this policy, Mister Deaf Spain 2012 was disqualified of his title "Mister Deaf Europe 2012", after being disrespectful to the MMDI staff as well as displaying unacceptable sexual behavior. Miss Deaf Germany 2012 was disqualified of her title "Miss Deaf Congeniality 2012", after she had broken the arranged expectations of MMDI.

== Titleholders ==
Date and Place	Miss Deaf International	Mister Deaf International	Miss Deaf Queen International	Mrs Deaf International
July 13, 2019; Saint Petersburg, Russia	Kemmonye Mamatsits; Botswana	Ajith Kumar; India	Not awarded	Not awarded
July 14, 2018; Taipei, Taiwan	Natalia Colombo; Italy	Mergim Noshaj; Kosovo	Somporn Kaewkeod; Thailand	Bussara Sangkrut Okada; Thailand
July 15, 2017; Paris, France	Céline Cornia; Belgium	Mateusz Borowski; Poland	Not awarded	Not awarded
July 2016; Las Vegas, United States	Iwona Cichosz; Poland	Calvin Vogefu Musalia; Kenya	Somsakul Thongfaung; Thailand	Not awarded
August 5, 2014; London, United Kingdom	YeJin Kim; South Korea	Aarron Loggins; United States	Not awarded	Not awarded
July 31, 2013; Sofia, Bulgaria	Laís Gonçalves; Brazil	Rafael Grombelka; Germany	Not awarded	Not awarded
July 27, 2012; Ankara, Turkey	Natalia Ryabova; Belarus	Cevat Şimşek; Turkey	Not awarded	Not awarded
July 16, 2011; Orlando, Florida	Cassandra Whyte; Jamaica	Not awarded	Not awarded	Not awarded
July 31, 2010; Las Vegas, United States	Julie Abbou; France	Not awarded	Not awarded	Not awarded

== See also ==
- List of beauty pageants
