= Big Brother (Israeli TV series) season 2 =

Big Brother
- Season 2
- Presented by: Erez Tal; Assi Azar
- No. of days: 110
- No. of housemates: 21
- Winner: Eliraz Sadeh
- Runner-up: Sa'ar Scheinfein
- No. of episodes: 33

Release
- Original network: Channel 2 (Keshet)
- Original release: 15 November 2009 – 4 March 2010

Season chronology
- ← Previous; Season 1 Next → Season 3

HaAh HaGadol 2 (Hebrew: האח הגדול 2, lit. The Big Brother 2) is the second series of the Israeli version of the reality show Big Brother. The show was first broadcast on 15 November 2009 and ended on 4 March 2010. Sixteen housemates entered the house on launch night and another five joining after 43 days. The housemates competed for a one million shekel prize. The house was located in Neve Ilan, a suburb of Jerusalem. The twist this season was that the house was split in half, the same concept used in Big Brother 9 (UK), and the introduction of the Head of House.

== Housemates ==
Name	Age	Hometown	Occupation	Day entered	Day exited	Status
Eliraz Sadeh	27	Hadera	Waiter	1	110	Winner
Sa'ar Scheinfein	37	Tel Aviv	Lawyer	1	110	Runner-up
Alina "Alin" Levy	19	Rishon LeZion	Military service / model	1	110	Third Place
Futna Jaber	37	Tel Aviv	Owner of falafel restaurant with her husband A'kram.	1	110	Fourth Place
Go'el Pinto	39	Tel Aviv	Journalist and cinematographer	1	110	Fifth Place
Erez Da Drezner	31	Haifa	Model	1	105	Evicted
Ayala Reshef	25	Tel Aviv	Publicist	1	98	Evicted
Hila Ifergan	25	Petah Tikva	Post office clerk	43	91	Evicted
Edna Kaneti	54	Hod Hasharon		43	78	Walked (Note: She walked from the house on Day 78, due to medical reasons.)
Tomer Lanzmann	25	Giv'atayim	Events manager in a coffee house and a communications student	43	70	Evicted
Sarah Levin	61	Tel Aviv	(Note: Mother-in-law of Miki Levin from season 1 of Big Brother Israel.)	1	63	Evicted
Dana Rahamimov	25	Caesarea		43	56	Evicted
Tamara Haimov	36	Tel Aviv	Sales manager and medical management student	43	56	Evicted
Yosef Natan Bachar	31	Moshav Olesh	Yoga instructor	1	49	Evicted
Stav Vaknin	25	Ramla	Student studying to achieve high school matriculation.	1	38	Evicted
Bentsi Shani	45	Modi'in	Plumber	1	36	Walked
Aviv Savyon	26	Neve Monosson	Computers and information systems	1	31	Evicted
Ji Shemesh	29	Ramla	Insurance agent and appraisal clerk	1	22	Evicted
Moti Khudeda	32	Kiryat Tiv'on	Works in the shipping container division of the Haifa port.	1	15	Walked (Note: Chose to leave the house after his wife Ma'ayan was ejected from the show.)
Ma'ayan Buzaglo Khudeda	22	Kiryat Tiv'on	Hairdresser	1	15	Ejected (Note: Ejected due to unacceptable behaviour after she repeatedly cursed other housemates, used threatening and aggressive language towards several others, at one point threw water at one of them, and showed no intention of changing her behaviour. Ma'ayan became the first housemate to be ejected from the house in the Israeli version of the show.)
Dalit Leumi	34	Tel Aviv	Clothing designer.	1	10	Evicted

=== Byrdie ===
Byrdie Bell, a 24-year-old woman from New York City, is an American actress who entered the house on Day 71. She was a fake housemate, and the housemates believed she was evicted from the US edition of Big Brother to be sent to the Israeli house. The housemates also believe the public will be voting on whether or not Byrdie should stay in the house as a housemate or be evicted. She left the house on Day 74.

== Nominations table ==
	Week 1	Week 2	Week 3	Week 4	Week 5	Week 6	Week 7	Week 8	Week 9	Week 10	Week 11	Week 12	Week 13	Week 14	Week 15	Week 16 Final	
Eliraz	No; Nominations	No; Nominations	Stav, Yosef	Aviv, Stav	Yosef, Stav	No; Nominations	Yosef, Ayala	Alin, Go'el	Sa'ar, Sarah	Tomer, Ayala	No; Nominations	No; Nominations	Ayala, Sa'ar	Ayala, Sa'ar	Sa'ar, Erez	Winner (Day 110)	
Sa'ar	No; Nominations	No; Nominations	Ji, Yosef	Yosef, Erez	Yosef, Alin	No; Nominations	Yosef, Alin	Ayala, Tomer	Go'el, Eliraz	Hila, Eliraz	No; Nominations	No; Nominations	Hila, Alin	Alin, Eliraz	Alin, Eliraz	Runner-Up (Day 110)	
Alin	Completed; Task	No; Nominations	Aviv, Erez	Erez, Futna	Yosef, Stav	No; Nominations	Sa'ar, Ayala	Eliraz, Go'el	Sa'ar, Ayala	Tomer, Ayala	No; Nominations	No; Nominations	Erez, Ayala	Ayala, Futna	Erez, Sa'ar	Third Place (Day 110)	
Futna	No; Nominations	No; Nominations	Sarah, Stav	Aviv, Yosef	Yosef, Sarah	No; Nominations	Sarah, Yosef	Eliraz, Go'el	Tomer, Sarah	Tomer, Edna	No; Nominations	No; Nominations	Hila, Erez	Erez, Ayala	Alin, Erez	Fourth Place (Day 110)	
Go'el	No; Nominations	No; Nominations	Aviv, Ji	Aviv, Erez	Yosef, Sarah	No; Nominations	Yosef, Erez	Alin, Eliraz	Sa'ar, Ayala	Sa'ar, Tomer	No; Nominations	No; Nominations	Erez, Ayala	Ayala, Erez	Erez, Sa'ar	Fifth Place (Day 110)	
Erez	No; Nominations	No; Nominations	Go'el, Futna	Go'el, Futna	Go'el, Alin	No; Nominations	Alin, Ayala	Sa'ar, Tomer	Go'el, Alin	Go'el, Alin	No; Nominations	No; Nominations	Alin, Go'el	Alin, Eliraz	Go'el, Alin	Evicted (Day 105)	
Ayala	No; Nominations	No; Nominations	Bentsi, Yosef	Yosef, Bentsi	Yosef, Stav	No; Nominations	Sarah, Alin	Sa'ar, Tomer	Eliraz, Hila	Hila, Eliraz	No; Nominations	No; Nominations	Hila, Alin	Alin, Eliraz	Evicted (Day 98)		
Hila	Not in House						Ayala, Alin	Dana, Tomer	Sa'ar, Ayala	Sa'ar, Ayala	No; Nominations	No; Nominations	Sa'ar, Ayala	Evicted (Day 91)			
Edna	Not in House						Sarah, Eliraz	Eliraz, Go'el	Sarah, Tomer	Tomer, Sa'ar	No; Nominations	Walked (Day 78)					
Tomer	Not in House						Yosef, Eliraz	Sarah, Sa'ar	Go'el, Eliraz	Eliraz, Go'el	Evicted (Day 70)						
Sarah	Completed; Task	No; Nominations	Futna, Yosef	Yosef, Bentsi	Yosef, Futna	No; Nominations	Ayala, Sa'ar	Tamara, Tomer	Edna, Eliraz	Evicted (Day 63)							
Dana	Not in House						Sarah, Alin	Hila, Tomer	Evicted (Day 56)								
Tamara	Not in House						Futna, Ayala	Sarah, Tomer	Evicted (Day 56)								
Yosef	No; Nominations	No; Nominations	Bentsi, Sarah	Bentsi, Erez	Sarah, Futna	No; Nominations	Alin, Futna	Evicted (Day 49)									
Stav	No; Nominations	No; Nominations	Futna, Ji	Aviv, Yosef	Alin, Futna	Evicted (Day 38)											
Bentsi	No; Nominations	No; Nominations	Yosef, Erez	Erez, Aviv	Walked (Day 36)												
Aviv	Completed; Task	No; Nominations	Ji, Alin	Alin, Eliraz	Evicted (Day 31)												
Ji	No; Nominations	No; Nominations	Aviv, Sarah	Evicted (Day 22)													
Moti	Completed; Task	No; Nominations	Walked (Day 15)														
Ma'ayan	Completed; Task	No; Nominations	Ejected (Day 15)														
Dalit	No; Nominations	Evicted (Day 10)															
Notes	^{1}	none					^{2}	^{3}	none		^{4}	none			^{5}	^{6}	
Head of House	none			Sarah	Erez		Go'el	none									
Nominated for eviction	Ayala, Bentsi, Dalit, Eliraz, Erez, Futna, Go'el, Ji, Ma'ayan, Sa'ar, Stav, Yosef	none	Aviv, Futna, Ji, Sarah, Yosef	Aviv, Erez, Yosef	Alin, Futna, Sarah, Stav, Yosef	none	Alin, Ayala, Yosef	Alin, Ayala, Dana, Edna, Erez, Futna, Hila, Sa'ar, Sarah, Tamara	Ayala, Eliraz, Go'el, Sa'ar, Sarah	Ayala, Eliraz, Sa'ar, Tomer	All; Housemates	none	Alin, Ayala, Erez, Hila	Alin, Ayala, Eliraz	Alin, Eliraz, Erez, Go'el, Sa'ar	All; Housemates	
Walked	none	Moti	none		Bentsi	none					Edna	none					
Ejected	none	Ma'ayan	none														
Evicted	Dalit	Eviction canceled	Ji	Aviv	Stav	Eviction canceled	Yosef	Tamara; Dana	Sarah	Tomer	Eliraz; Fake eviction	Eviction canceled	Hila	Ayala	Erez	Go'el; Fewest votes to win	Futna; Fewest votes to win
Evicted	Dalit	Eviction canceled	Ji	Aviv	Stav	Eviction canceled	Yosef	Tamara; Dana	Sarah	Tomer	Eliraz; Fake eviction	Eviction canceled	Hila	Ayala	Erez	Alin; Fewest votes to win	Sa'ar; Fewest votes to win
Evicted	Dalit	Eviction canceled	Ji	Aviv	Stav	Eviction canceled	Yosef	Tamara; Dana	Sarah	Tomer	Eliraz; Fake eviction	Eviction canceled	Hila	Ayala	Erez	Eliraz; Most votes to win	

=== Notes ===
- ^1 Alin, Aviv, Moti, Ma'ayan and Sarah were immune from eviction after winning a secret mission (Hide the fact that Ma'ayan and Moti are a married couple). Ma'ayan was nominated for eviction after breaking the house rules.
- ^2 Dana, Edna, Hila, Tamara and Tomer were immune from being nominated because they are new housemates.
- ^3 Housemates nominated who they wanted to stay in the house and the three housemates with the most votes got immunity. For the first time in this season, two housemates were evicted from the Big Brother house.
- ^4 This week was a Fake Week, similar to the Fake Week in Big Brother 8 UK. A fake housemate entered named Byrdie with a chance to become an actual Big Brother Israel housemate; she was evicted. On Day 77, Eliraz was evicted and interviewed by the show's hosts and then put back into the house.
- ^5 In week 15, any housemate who got at least one vote, was nominated for eviction.
- ^6 There were no nominations in the final week and the public was voting for housemates to win, rather than be evicted. the housemate with the most SMS votes was the winner.
