= Big Brother (Israeli TV series) season 10 =

Big Brother
- Season 10
- Presented by: Liron Weizman; Guy Zu-Aretz
- No. of days: 95
- No. of housemates: 21
- Winner: Tikva Gidon
- Runner-up: Yarden Edri
- No. of episodes: 47 (Note: Include one reunion episode.)

Release
- Original network: Reshet 13
- Original release: 1 January – 4 April 2020

Season chronology
- ← Previous; Season 9 Next → Season 11

HaAh HaGadol 10 (Hebrew: האח הגדול 10; lit. The Big Brother 10) is the tenth season of the Israeli version of the reality show Big Brother. The season premiered on 1 January 2020 on Reshet 13. Applications for this season started on 2 September 2018 after season 9 ended on 1 September 2018.

Liron Weizman and Guy Zu-Aretz co-host the show. In addition, model Eden Fines, as the "Digital Sister", who talks about everything happening in the house on Facebook, Instagram, the show's website and the Big Brother app.

The finale was on 4 April 2020, and the winner was Tikva Gidon.

== Housemates ==
Just hours before the show was launched and the housemates entered the Big Brother house, the production decided that one of the contestants, the plus-size model Orel Alloushe, who was supposed to enter the house during the show would not enter, after the discovery of a wrapper of Escitalopram on the hotel floor, by production team, and fear that others will use them. The production company stated in response: "It was indeed decided that one of the contestants who was supposed to enter the Big Brother house this evening would not enter." Orel was revealed to be the housemate entered the house on 24 December 2019. Therefore, in the last minute's change, Orel was replaced by the former Knesset member Oren Hazan three days after the season's premiere.

On Day 46, six new housemates entered the house.

Name	Age	Occupation	Residence	Day entered	Day exited	Status
Tikva Gidon	31	Restaurant Manager	Holon	1	95	Winner
Yarden Edri	25	Model and Student	Kiryat Motzkin	1	95	Runner-up
Asif Elkayam	28	Writer	Poriah	1	95	Third Place
Gad Panivilov	22	TBA	Kiryat Haim	1	95	Fourth Place
Odelya Swisa	34	Pharmaceutical Worker	Yeruham	46	95	Fifth Place
Adam Alayof	22	Businessman and Jeweler	Tel Aviv	1	93	Evicted
Yosi Urpali	66	Retired	Ramat Gan	1	92	Evicted
Lior Duek	28	Broker	Herzliya	1	88	Evicted
Nir Avishai Cohen	38	Military Veteran	Beit Hanania	1	86	Evicted
Shirly Sidik	25	Makeup Artist and Bartender	Tel Aviv	46	81	Evicted
Paul Tashgian	26	Gym owner	Haifa	46	74	Evicted
Hagit Heiman	36	Rehab Coach	Herzliya	1	67	Evicted
Noam Levi	22	Special education student and substitute teacher	Ganei Tikva	46	62	Evicted
Kfir Cohen	34	Art Gallery Director	Tel Aviv	46	60	Evicted
Alon Volkovitski	47	Criminal Lawyer	Petah Tikva	46	49	Ejected
Emilie Pery	34	Real Estate Broker	Netanya	1	44	Evicted
Ronen Feigenbaum	44	Former football player	Tel Aviv	1	39	Evicted
Ruth Elbaz	31	Writer	Tel Aviv	1	32	Evicted
Yael Feffer	46	Businesswoman	Gedera	1	25	Evicted
Mishel Micheev	21	Model and Lifeguard	Ramat Gan	1	18	Evicted
Oren Hazan	38	Former Knesset member	Ariel	4	11	Left

== Nominations table ==
	Week 1	Week 2	Week 3	Week 4	Week 5	Week 6	Week 7		Week 8		Week 9		Week 10	Week 11	Week 12		Week 13		Final	
	Week 1	Week 2	Week 3	Week 4	Week 5	Week 6	Nomination games	Fake eviction	Week 8		Day 62	Day 65	Week 10	Week 11	Day 85	Day 86	Day 88	Day 92	Final	
Tikva	No; Nominations	Banned	Banned	Banned	Banned	Emilie; Yarden	Not; Eligible	Noam	Yarden; Asif		No; Nominations	Asif; Adam	Shirly; Paul	Yosi; Odelya	Yarden; Adam	No; Nominations	No; Nominations	No; Nominations	Winner (Day 95)	
Yarden	Nominated	Yael; Hagit	Tikva; Nir	Hagit; Nir	Asif; Nir	Hagit; Tikva	Not; Eligible	Paul	Kfir; Hagit		No; Nominations	Nir; Paul	Tikva; Lior	Tikva; Nir	Nir; Tikva	No; Nominations	No; Nominations	No; Nominations	Runner-up (Day 95)	
Asif	No; Nominations	Yael; Nir	Nir; Yael	Ronen; Nir	Lior; Nir	Hagit; Yarden	Kfir	Nir	Lior; Nir		No; Nominations	Nir; Lior	Nir; Tikva	Tikva; Nir	Nir; Odelya	No; Nominations	No; Nominations	No; Nominations	Third Place (Day 95)	
Gad	Nominated	Yael; Nir	Nir; Ruth	Nir; Ruth	Ronen; Nir	Emilie; Adam	Not; Eligible	Kfir	Adam; Shirly		No; Nominations	Shirly; Adam	Shirly; Paul	Shirly; Odelya	Odelya; Yarden	No; Nominations	No; Nominations	No; Nominations	Fourth Place (Day 95)	
Odelya	Not in House						Not; Eligible	Shirly	Kfir; Paul		No; Nominations	Nir; Paul	Paul; Shirly	Shirly; Yosi	Asif; Tikva	No; Nominations	No; Nominations	No; Nominations	Fifth Place (Day 95)	
Adam	Nominated	Tikva; Lior	Lior; Yael	Lior; Nir	Hagit; Nir	Hagit; Lior	Not; Eligible	Hagit	Lior; Hagit		No; Nominations	Nir; Lior	Paul; Nir	Tikva; Nir	Nir; Tikva	No; Nominations	No; Nominations	No; Nominations	Evicted (Day 93)	
Yosi	No; Nominations	Yael; Nir	Nir; Ruth	Nir; Ruth	Ronen; Nir	Asif; Adam	Not; Eligible	Kfir	Yarden; Asif		Prime; Minister	Nir; Shirly	Nir; Shirly	Shirly; Odelya	Nir; Odelya	No; Nominations	No; Nominations	Evicted (Day 92)		
Lior	Nominated	Gad; Mishel	Ronen; Gad	Adam; Hagit	Adam; Hagit	Asif; Adam	Shirly	Kfir	Kfir; Asif		No; Nominations	Shirly; Adam	Odelya; Shirly	Shirly; Odelya	Odelya; Yarden	No; Nominations	Evicted (Day 88)			
Nir	Exempt	Gad; Yosi	Gad; Yarden	Yarden; Gad	Adam; Yosi	Asif; Adam	Alon	Adam	Asif; Adam; Hagit; Yarden; Yosi		No; Nominations	Asif; Hagit	Asif; Shirly	Asif; Shirly	Asif; Yarden	Evicted (Day 86)				
Shirly	Not in House						Lior	Noam	Noam; Odelya		No; Nominations	Hagit; Lior	Lior; Paul	Nir; Odelya	Evicted (Day 81)					
Paul	Not in House						Tikva	Shirly	Yarden		No; Nominations	Shirly; Adam	Odelya; Shirly	Evicted (Day 74)						
Hagit	No; Nominations	Yosi; Emilie	Nir; Yarden	Lior; Nir	Adam; Emilie	Asif; Emilie	Not; Eligible	Asif	Asif; Noam		No; Nominations	Nir; Shirly	Evicted (Day 67)							
Noam	Not in House						Not; Eligible	Shirly	Hagit; Shirly		No; Nominations	Evicted (Day 62)								
Kfir	Not in House						Gad	Yarden	Lior; Odelya		Evicted (Day 60)									
Alon	Not in House						Not; Eligible	Ejected (Day 49)												
Emilie	No; Nominations	Yael; Nir	Ruth; Nir	Ruth; Hagit	Hagit; Tikva	Adam; Asif	Evicted (Day 44)													
Ronen	Nominated	Tikva; Lior	Emilie; Yael	Tikva; Asif	Emilie; Asif	Evicted (Day 39)														
Ruth	Nominated	Gad; Mishel	Gad; Hagit	Gad; Hagit	Evicted (Day 32)															
Yael	No; Nominations	Emilie; Ronen	Gad; Asif	Evicted (Day 25)																
Mishel	No; Nominations	Gad; Ruth	Evicted (Day 18)																	
Temporary Housemates
Oren	No; Nominations	Left (Day 11)																		
Notes	1, 2, 3, 4	5, 6, 7	6, 8	6, 9, 10	6	11, 12	13, 14, 15	16, 17	11, 18		19	none		20	21	22	none		23	
Nominated (pre-save and replace)	none	Adam; Gad; Nir; Yael; Yarden	Adam; Gad; Jordan; Nir; Ruth; Yael	none			Alon; Gad; Kfir; Lior; Shirley; Tikva	Asif; Hagit; Kfir; Nir; Noam; Paul; Shirley; Yarden	Asif; Hagit; Kfir; Lior; Noam; Yarden	~~Adam~~; ~~Asif~~; ~~Hagit~~; ~~Yarden~~; ~~Yosi~~	Adam; Asif; Gad; Hagit; Lior; Nir; Noam; Odelya; Paul; Shirley; Tikva; Yarden	none								
Saved	none	Nir	Gad	none			Kfir	none	none		none	none								
Against public vote	Adam; Gad; Lior; Ronen; Ruth; Yarden	Adam; Gad; Mishel; Yael; Yarden	Adam; Jordan; Nir; Ruth; Tikva; Yael	Emilie; Gad; Hagit; Lior; Nir; Ruth	Adam; Asif; Emilie; Hagit; Nir; Ronen	Adam; Asif; Emilie; Gad; Hagit; Lior; Tikva; Yarden; Yosi	~~Alon~~; Asif; Gad; Lior; Shirley; Tikva	none	Asif; Hagit; Kfir; Lior; Noam; Yarden		none	Adam; Asif; Hagit; Lior; Nir; Paul; Shirly	Lior; Nir; Odelya; Paul; Shirly; Tikva	Adam; Nir; Odelya; Shirly; Tikva; Yosi	Asif; Gad; Nir; Odelia; Tikva; Yardan	All; Housemates				
Ejected	none						Alon	none												
Evicted	~~Adam~~; ~~Fewest votes~~ ~~to save~~ Eviction; Cancelled	Mishel; Fewest votes to save	Yael; Fewest votes to save	Ruth; Fewest votes to save	Ronen; Fewest votes to save	Emilie; Fewest votes to save	Eviction; Cancelled	Nir; Fake evicted by wheel	Kfir; Fewest votes to save		Noam; Yosi's choice (out of 2) to evict	Hagit; Fewest votes to save	Paul; Fewest votes to save	Shirly; Fewest votes to save	Nir; Fewest votes to save	Lior; Fewest votes to save	Yosi; Fewest votes to save	Adam; Fewest votes to save	Odelya; Fewest votes (out of 5)	Gad; Fewest votes (out of 4)
Evicted	~~Adam~~; ~~Fewest votes~~ ~~to save~~ Eviction; Cancelled	Mishel; Fewest votes to save	Yael; Fewest votes to save	Ruth; Fewest votes to save	Ronen; Fewest votes to save	Emilie; Fewest votes to save	Eviction; Cancelled	Nir; Fake evicted by wheel	Kfir; Fewest votes to save		Noam; Yosi's choice (out of 2) to evict	Hagit; Fewest votes to save	Paul; Fewest votes to save	Shirly; Fewest votes to save	Nir; Fewest votes to save	Lior; Fewest votes to save	Yosi; Fewest votes to save	Adam; Fewest votes to save	Asif; Fewest votes (out of 3)	Yarden; Fewest votes (out of 2)
Evicted	~~Adam~~; ~~Fewest votes~~ ~~to save~~ Eviction; Cancelled	Mishel; Fewest votes to save	Yael; Fewest votes to save	Ruth; Fewest votes to save	Ronen; Fewest votes to save	Emilie; Fewest votes to save	Eviction; Cancelled	Nir; Fake evicted by wheel	Kfir; Fewest votes to save		Noam; Yosi's choice (out of 2) to evict	Hagit; Fewest votes to save	Paul; Fewest votes to save	Shirly; Fewest votes to save	Nir; Fewest votes to save	Lior; Fewest votes to save	Yosi; Fewest votes to save	Adam; Fewest votes to save	Tikva; Most votes to win	

=== Notes ===
- ^1 : On Day 1, Big Brother handed out 3 different secret missions. For the first mission, Tikva had to impersonate a seventh-month pregnant woman for a week. In the second mission, Nir, the atheist had to impersonate a religious settler. The third mission was for Assif to ensure that the true identities of Tikva and Nir would not be revealed. If either Tikva or Nir succeeded in their missions, they would gain immunity from the first nomination. If Asif succeeded in his mission, all housemates would earn a luxury shopping budget. Only Nir succeed in his mission, thus receiving immunity.
- ^2 : Oren Hazan entered the house for only a week.
- ^3 : The nominees of the first week were determined by the "Great Writer" mission.
- ^4 : Adam was chosen by the viewers as the first evictee, but was saved because of Oren's decision to abolish the eviction.
- As punishment for discussing nominations, Yarden was automatically nominated for eviction on Day 12.
- ^6 : On Day 12, as the result of the mission, Tikva would not be able to nominate and Adam was automatically nominated until further notice.
- ^7 : Big Brother decided Ruth could save one of the nominees and nominate another one. Ruth chose to save Nir and replaced them with Mishel.
- ^8 : Following a mission, Yosi was given the power to save one of the nominees and nominate someone else. Yosi chose to save Gad and replaced them with Tikva.
- ^9 : As punishment for discussing nominations, Emilie was automatically nominated for eviction.
- ^10 : In the time task, Lior was able to add minutes to the task or cancel the permanent nomination of Adam. He chose to cancel the permanent nomination of Adam.
- ^11 : Following the telephone mission, Tikva was able to nominate, but she had to nominate in public.
- ^12 : As punishment for discussing nominations, Lior was automatically nominated for eviction.
- ^13 : As punishment for constantly breaking the rules of discussion of information from the outside world since his arrival on Day 46, Alon was ejected from the Big Brother House.
- ^14 : Kfir won the mission and removed himself from the nomination list and nominated Asif in his place.
- ^15 : Alon was removed from the nomination list after being ejected from the Big Brother House.
- ^16 : The fake nomination list was determined by the "nomination games" mission.
- ^17 : The real eviction, each housemate puts on an image of one housemate of their choice on the wheel. After it finished, Tikva spun the wheel and pointer of the wheel landed on Nir's sections means Nir was evicted. But it was revealed on stage that it is a fake eviction, Nir will stay in a suite for a few days.
- ^18 : The housemates nominated as normal, and Nir, who spends his time in the suite and succeeded in the secret mission, therefore, was given the power to make a nomination list of his own. The viewers will decide which one is the final nomination list. The viewers chose the housemates' nomination list.
- ^19 : Yosi was elected Prime Minister and as a result, he was granted immunity and the power to evict one of the two housemates who received the fewest votes from the house. During the live show, Yosi had to choose between Noam and Shirley to evict, he chose Noam.
- ^20 : Adam was automatically nominated for breaking the rules.
- ^21 : Gad was automatically nominated for breaking the rules.
- ^22 : There were two evictions this week. For the second eviction, all housemates were nominated for eviction.
- ^23 : The public was voting to win rather than to save.

== Nominations totals received ==
	Week 1	Week 2	Week 3	Week 4	Week 5	Week 6	Week 7		Week 8	Week 9		Week 10	Week 11	Week 12		Week 13		Final	Total
Tikva	-	2	1	1	1	1	1	0	0	-	0	2	3	3	-	-	-	Winner	15
Yarden	-	-	2	1	0	2	0	1	4	-	0	0	0	4	-	-	-	Runner-up	14
Asif	-	0	1	1	3	5	1	1	5	-	2	1	1	2	-	-	-	Third Place	23
Gad	-	4	4	2	0	0	1	0	0	-	0	0	0	0	-	-	-	Fourth Place	11
Odelya	Not in House						0	0	2	-	0	2	5	4	-	-	-	Fifth Place	13
Adam	-	-	-	1	2	5	0	0	2	-	4	0	0	1	-	-	-	Evicted	15
Yosi	-	2	0	0	1	0	0	0	1	-	0	0	2	2	-	-	Evicted		6
Lior	-	2	1	2	1	1	1	0	3	-	3	2	0	0	-	Evicted			16
Nir	-	4	6	6	5	0	0	1	1	-	6	3	4	4	Evicted				40
Shirly	Not in House						1	3	2	-	5	7	5	Evicted					23
Paul	Not in House						0	1	1	-	2	5	Evicted						9
Hagit	-	1	1	4	3	3	0	1	4	-	2	Evicted							19
Noam	Not in House						0	2	3	-	Evicted								6
Kfir	Not in House						1	3	3	Evicted									7
Alon	Not in House						1	Ejected											1
Emilie	-	2	1	-	2	3	Evicted												8
Ronen	-	1	1	1	2	Evicted													5
Ruth	-	1	3	3	Evicted														7
Yael	-	5	3	Evicted															8
Mishel	-	2	Evicted																2
Oren	-	Left																	N/A
