= Big Brother (Israeli TV series) season 12 =

Big Brother
- Season 12
- Presented by: Liron Weizman; Guy Zu-Aretz
- No. of days: 103
- No. of housemates: 24
- Winner: Talia Ovadia
- Runner-up: Bar Cohen

Release
- Original network: Reshet 13
- Original release: 7 June – 17 September 2022

Season chronology
- ← Previous; Season 11 Next → Season 13

HaAh HaGadol 12 (Hebrew: האח הגדול 12; lit. The Big Brother 12) is the Israeli version of the reality television show Big Brother. The twelfth season premiered on June 7, 2022, on Israeli broadcast channel Reshet 13.

The season was unique in several ways: for the first time in the program's history, the Big Brother house had several floors and an elevator. Two days before the start of the season, one of the housemates tested positive for COVID-19 and did not enter the house until the ninth day. On the third day, a person chosen at random was picked to join the Big Brother house, another first in the Big Brother franchise. On the fifth day, houseguest Talia Ovadia, ex-girlfriend of contestant Eliav Tati, joined the Big Brother house.

== Housemates ==
24 housemates entered the house on day one, and further participants entered on days three, five, and nine due to testing positive for COVID-19.

Name	Age	Occupation / Notability	Residence	Day entered	Day exited	Status
Talia Ovadia	28	Digital marketing business owner and dress designer	Herzliya	5	103	Winner
Bar Noa Cohen	30	Eyebrow stylist	Jerusalem	1	103	Runner-up
Shahaf Raz	33	Publicity person	Tel Aviv	1	103	Third Place
Ilana Taranenko	30	Hair extension business owner and aspiring singer	Haifa	1	103	Fourth Place
Netanel Rudnitzky	32	Musician, driver, rapper and producer	Ramat Gan	1	103	Fifth Place
Dror Ruckenstein	45	Bar manager	Gan Yavne	55	103	Sixth Place
Riwa Raslan	26	Family business employee	Kiryat Shmona	1	96	18th Evicted
Daniel Malka	22	Army veteran	Tel Aviv	1	94	17th Evicted
Kazim Khalilieh	28	Public relations worker	Tel Aviv	1	89	16th Evicted
Moshe Kugman	31	Football coach	Beersheba	47	87	15th Evicted
Ofek Levy	21	Playwright, director and owner of a media and digital office	Tel Aviv	1	82	14th Evicted
Marina Kuznetsova	20	Network anchor	Givatayim	1	82	13th Evicted
Sharin Avraham	30	Budgeter in an advertising agency and waitress	Tel Aviv	1	82	12th Evicted
Lia Tay Aharony	25	Law student and model	Petah Tikva	45	75	11th Evicted
Dina Arami Simhi	58	Cashier	Rosh HaAyin	1	68	10th Evicted
Liran Rozen	31	Food blogger	Tel Aviv	41	66	9th Evicted
David Mazhari	63	Gym teacher, folk dance class dancer	Beit Arif	45	66	8th Evicted
Dana Amsalem	23	Toenail Designer, make up artist, YouTuber and Law Student	Haifa	45	62	7th Evicted
Dian Schwartz	23	Model	Tel Aviv	1	55	6th Evicted
Sharon Benifusi	26	Actor	Bet Shean	3	40	5th Evicted
Eliav Tati	32	Accountant	Rishon LeZion	1	33	4th Evicted
Diana Taranenko	31	Hair extension business owner and aspiring singer	Haifa	1	26	3rd Evicted
Omri Alfia	26	Dog trainer	Tel Aviv	9	19	2nd Evicted
Rachel Burta	70	Nutritionist	Tel Aviv	1	12	1st Evicted

== Nominations table ==
	Week 1	Week 2	Week 3	Week 4	Week 5	Week 6	Week 7	Week 8	Week 9	Week 10			Week 11	Week 12	Week 13		Week 14		Final	
Talia	No; Nominations	Nominated	Dian & Netanel; Sharin	Sharin; Diana	No; Nominations	Bar; Ilana	No; Nominations	Dana; Lia	Dana; David	Dror	No; Nominations	Lia; Ofek	Lia; Sharin	No; Nominations	Shahaf	No; Nominations	No; Nominations	No; Nominations	Winner (Day 103)	
Bar	No; Nominations	Nominated	Sharon; Sharin	Sharin; Shahaf	No; Nominations	Talia; Shahaf	No; Nominations	Shahaf; Netanel	David; Liran	David; Liran	No; Nominations	Dror; Moshe	Dror; Moshe	No; Nominations	Ilana	No; Nominations	No; Nominations	No; Nominations	Runner-up (Day 103)	
Shahaf	No; Nominations	Nominated	Sharon; Diana	Bar; Diana	No; Nominations	Bar; Ilana	No; Nominations	Dana; Liran	Kazim; Ofek	Bar; Lia	No; Nominations	Bar; Dror	Kazim; Marina	No; Nominations	Daniel	No; Nominations	No; Nominations	No; Nominations	Third Place (Day 103)	
Ilana	No; Nominations	Nominated	Dina; Riwa	Dina; Riwa	No; Nominations	Sharon; Dina	No; Nominations	Dina; Liran	Dana; Liran	Liran; Dana	No; Nominations	Dror; Dina	Moshe; Dror	No; Nominations	Kazim	Exempt			Fourth Place (Day 103)	
Netanel	With; Dian						No; Nominations	Dana; Liran	Sharin; Liran	Sharin; Liran	No; Nominations	Kazim; Riwa	Kazim; Lia	No; Nominations	Ilana	No; Nominations	No; Nominations	No; Nominations	Fifth Place (Day 103)	
Dror	Not in House								Lia; Liran	Liran; Bar	No; Nominations	Bar; Riwa	Bar; Riwa	No; Nominations	Talia	No; Nominations	No; Nominations	No; Nominations	Sixth Place (Day 103)	
Riwa	No; Nominations	Nominated	Dian & Netanel; Sharon	Diana; Ilana	No; Nominations	Ilana; Dian & Netanel	No; Nominations	Marina; Daniel	Marina; Daniel	David; Daniel	No; Nominations	Netanel; Dror	Netanel; Moshe	No; Nominations	Kazim	No; Nominations	No; Nominations	No; Nominations	Evicted (Day 96)	
Daniel	No; Nominations	Exempt	Diana; Sharon	Bar; Riwa	No; Nominations	Sharin; Sharon	No; Nominations	Kazim; Liran	Kazim; Ofek	Riwa; Ofek	No; Nominations	Ofek; Riwa	Riwa; Ofek	No; Nominations	Ilana	No; Nominations	No; Nominations	Evicted (Day 94)		
Kazim	No; Nominations	Exempt	Omri	Bar; Ofek	No; Nominations	Bar; Shahaf	No; Nominations	No; Nominations	Daniel; Shahaf	Moshe	No; Nominations	Netanel; Shahaf	Netanel; Moshe	No; Nominations	Ilana	No; Nominations	Evicted (Day 89)			
Moshe	Not in House							Exempt	Kazim; Ilana	Liran; Dina	No; Nominations	Kazim; Dina	Kazim; Marina	Exempt	Bar	Evicted (Day 87)				
Ofek	No; Nominations	Nominated	Dian & Netanel; Sharon	Ilana; Diana	Nominated	Sharon; Kazim	No; Nominations	Shahaf; Netanel	Shahaf; David	Daniel; Liran	No; Nominations	Daniel; Dror	Daniel; Talia	No; Nominations	Evicted (Day 82)					
Marina	No; Nominations	Exempt	Dina; Riwa	Ofek; Riwa	No; Nominations	Bar; Sharon	No; Nominations	Shahaf; Liran	Shahaf; Dana	Sharin; Shahaf	No; Nominations	Dror; Ofek	Lia; Ofek	No; Nominations	Evicted (Day 82)					
Sharin	No; Nominations	Exempt	Dian & Netanel; Ofek	Bar; Ofek	No; Nominations	Talia; Dian & Netanel	No; Nominations	Dian; Talia	Talia; Lia	Talia; Lia	No; Nominations	Netanel; Talia	Netanel; Talia	No; Nominations	Evicted (Day 82)					
Lia	Not in House						No; Nominations	Shahaf; Liran	Netanel; Liran	Liran; David	No; Nominations	Netanel; Dror	Netanel; Talia	Evicted (Day 75)						
Dina	No; Nominations	Exempt	Bar; Sharon	Bar; Diana	No; Nominations	Sharon; Ilana	No; Nominations	Dian; Shahaf	Shahaf; Lia	Moshe	No; Nominations	Dror; Shahaf	Evicted (Day 68)							
Liran	Not in House						No; Nominations	Bar	Daniel; David	Daniel; Lia	No; Nominations	Evicted (Day 66)								
David	Not in House						No; Nominations	Dian; Netanel	Kazim; Liran	Liran; Lia	Evicted (Day 66)									
Dana	Not in House						No; Nominations	Ilana; Liran	Talia; Ofek	Evicted (Day 62)										
Dian	With; Netanel						No; Nominations	Dana; Liran	Evicted (Day 55)											
Sharon	No; Nominations	Exempt	Bar; Ofek	Bar; Ofek	No; Nominations	Bar; Ofek	Evicted (Day 40)													
Eliav	No; Nominations	Nominated	Sharon; Sharin	Sharin; Diana	No; Nominations	Evicted (Day 33)														
Diana	No; Nominations	Nominated	Dina; Riwa	Ofek; Riwa	Evicted (Day 26)															
Omri	Not in House	Exempt	Sharon; Talia	Evicted (Day 19)																
Rachel	No; Nominations	Nominated	Evicted (Day 12)																	
Temporary Housemates
Dian & Netanel	No; Nominations	Nominated	Talia; Riwa	Riwa; Kazim	No; Nominations	Dina; Sharin	Split (Day 40)													
Note	1, 2	3, 4, 5, 6	7	8	9	10	11, 12, 13	14, 15	16, 17	18, 19, 20			20	21	22					
Nominated (pre-save and replace)	none	Bar; Daniel; Dian & Netanel; Diana; Eliav; Ilana; Ofek; Rachel; Riwa; Shahaf; Talia	none	none	none	Bar; Kazim; Ofek; Riwa; Shahaf; Talia	none	none	none	Daniel; David; Dror; Kazim; Lia; Liran; Moshe; Netanel	none	none	none	All; Housemates	none	none	none	none		
Against public vote	none	Bar; Dian & Netanel; Diana; Eliav; Ilana; Ofek; Rachel; Riwa; Shahaf; Talia	Dian & Netanel; Ilana; Kazim; Omri; Riwa; Sharon	Bar; Diana; Ilana; Ofek; Riwa; Sharin; Talia	All; Housemates	Bar; Ilana; Riwa; Sharon; Talia	none	Bar; Dian; Dana; Liran; Netanel; Ofek; Shahaf	Daniel; Dana; David; Kazim; Lia; Liran; Ofek; Shahaf	Daniel; David; Dror; Kazim; Liran; Moshe; Netanel; Talia	All; Housemates	Bar; Dina; Dror; Kazim; Netanel; Ofek; Riwa; Shahaf	Kazim; Lia; Moshe; Netanel; Talia	All; Housemates expect of Moshe	All; Housemates expect of Ilana	All; Housemates expect of Ilana	All; Housemates expect of Ilana	All; Housemates expect of Ilana		
Enter to next public vote 23	none	Kazim	Talia	Ofek	Riwa	Ofek	none	none												
Evicted	No; Eviction	Rachel; Fewest votes to save	Omri; Fewest votes to save	Diana; Fewest votes to save	Eliav; Fewest votes to save	Sharon; Fewest votes to save	No; Eviction	Dian; Fewest votes to save	Dana; Fewest votes to save	David; Fewest votes to save	Liran; Fewest votes to save	Dina; Fewest votes to save	Lia; Fewest votes to save	Sharin; Fewest votes to save	Moshe; Fewest votes to save	Kazim; Fewest votes to save	Daniel; Fewest votes to save	Riwa; Fewest votes to save	Dror; Fewest votes (out of 6)	Netanel; Fewest votes (out of 5)
Evicted	No; Eviction	Rachel; Fewest votes to save	Omri; Fewest votes to save	Diana; Fewest votes to save	Eliav; Fewest votes to save	Sharon; Fewest votes to save	No; Eviction	Dian; Fewest votes to save	Dana; Fewest votes to save	David; Fewest votes to save	Liran; Fewest votes to save	Dina; Fewest votes to save	Lia; Fewest votes to save	Marina; Fewest votes to save	Moshe; Fewest votes to save	Kazim; Fewest votes to save	Daniel; Fewest votes to save	Riwa; Fewest votes to save	Ilana; Fewest votes (out of 4)	Shahaf; Fewest votes (out of 3)
Evicted	No; Eviction	Rachel; Fewest votes to save	Omri; Fewest votes to save	Diana; Fewest votes to save	Eliav; Fewest votes to save	Sharon; Fewest votes to save	No; Eviction	Dian; Fewest votes to save	Dana; Fewest votes to save	David; Fewest votes to save	Liran; Fewest votes to save	Dina; Fewest votes to save	Lia; Fewest votes to save	Ofek; Fewest votes to save	Moshe; Fewest votes to save	Kazim; Fewest votes to save	Daniel; Fewest votes to save	Riwa; Fewest votes to save	Bar; Fewest votes (out of 2)	Talia; Most votes to win

=== Notes ===
- ^1: In the first week, Sharon and Talia enter separately from the housemate's entrance.
- ^2: In that same week, Netanel and Dian were treated as one housemate until the end of the Sixth week.
- ^3: Marina, Dian, Kazim, Sharon, and Sharin received immunity after Sharon chose them for his final 5, apart from the secret mission.
- ^4: In the second week, a new housemate named Omri entered the house, and after his entrance to the house on the opening night was postponed as a result of COVID-19 - after his late entrance he won immunity.
- ^5: Dian and Netanel are Nominated together as a result of the first secret mission.
- ^6: Ilana and Daniel chosen by the housemates go to the elevator, and one of them goes up to floor 6 and the other one to floor 7. A housemate that chooses floor 6 will get immunity, and the housemate that chooses floor 7 will stay on the eliminations list and stays on the next week's eliminations list. Daniel goes up to floor 6 and gets immunity and Ilana goes up to floor 7 and will stay on the eliminations list and at the next week's eliminations list.
- ^7: At the Bible Mission, Kazim casts Plagues on the housemates. Omri got the "Death of firstborn son" Plague, which means that Omri will be first of everything - to eat, smoke, go to sleep, and even to get nominated for elimination first. As a result, Omri is automatically on the eliminations list.
- ^8: At the Split Mission, Sharon and Dian & Netanel get immunity after Sharon and Dian got last in the "Non-favorites" Team.
- ^9: Big Brother places the housemates in a dilemma. In that week they will be Against the public or all of them will be nominated for elimination. The housemates choose the second choice and all of them will be nominated for elimination this week.
- ^10: Originally, That Entry Elimination's week list was: Ofek, Bar, Talia, Kazim, and Riwa. But after Sharon breaks the mission, the mission was canceled and That Entry Elimination's week was changed by the housemates.
- ^11: Moshe enters the house for a date with Sharin, and after that, he's back at Neve Ilan hotel. Sharin was supposed to choose whether she was to allow Moshe to stay in the house and if he will be an official housemate or not. Sharin chose to allow Moshe to stay in the house and he received immunity that week.
- ^12: Before their entry, 4 of the new housemates need to choose gifts for the housemates: estoppel, Public Elimination Setting, Automatic Elimination Setting, and immunity. Dana chose the Public Elimination Setting Gift and gave it to Riwa and Riwa was Supposed to Eliminate live in public for all the housemates. David chose the immunity Gift and gave it to Dina and Dina was Saved from Elimination. Lia chose the estoppel gift and gave it to Kazim so Kazim would not get eliminated in the next Elimination, and Liran chose the Automatic Elimination Setting and gave it to Bar, and Bar was Automatically on that week's elimination list.
- ^13: During this week, three major confrontations occurred. Shahaf and Kazim argued over food, leading Shahaf to force food into Kazim's mouth. The following day, a heated argument broke out between Dian and Kazim; Netanel attempted to calm Dian down, lost his temper, and smashed a vase. Shortly after, Dian and Sharin engaged in an aggressive confrontation that required Big Brother's intervention to prevent physical violence. Following these incidents, Dian, Shahaf, Kazim, Netanel, and Sharin all received official warnings.
- ^14: Dian and Netanel set eliminations and were punished by getting to the elimination list.
- ^15: After "Hitler's Scandal of Netanel and Shahaf", the elimination was postponed by a day and set to take place in the ninth week.
- ^16: In that week, Dror enters the house after recovering from COVID-19.
- ^17: Elimination was postponed to Sunday Due to Tisha B'Av.
- ^18: Kazim and Dina take Moshe to the Elimination List and Talia takes Dror to the Elimination during the fortune mission.
- ^19: Netanel and Kazim are automatically on the elimination list after a big fight between them.
- ^20: During the fortune list, one of the nominations will be saved and replaced by another housemate. The ball on the fortune roulette stops on Lia and she is saved from elimination and takes Talia to the elimination list.
- ^21: The housemates voted to eliminate in public.
- ^22: In that week, there will be triple elimination. All the housemates were eliminated except one housemate who received immunity. In the backyard, many packages of "Terminal X" are seen. One of them is named "immunity" and all of the rest of them are named "X." All of them choose one package, and Moshe opens the package and got the name "immunity" and is saved from elimination's week for the final 10. All the rest open the package in turns and receive "X" and go to the elimination list.
- ^23: The housemates vote on who gets the immunity. Ilana is chosen and automatically gets to the finals.
- ^24: After a housemate eviction, the evicted will choose another housemate to get automatically put on the next week's elimination list. The rule was canceled in the ninth week.

== Total nominations received ==
	Week 1	Week 2	Week 3	Week 4	Week 5	Week 6	Week 7	Week 8	Week 9	Week 10			Week 11	Week 12	Week 13		Week 14		Final	Total
Talia	-	-	2	1	-	3	-	1	2	1	-	1	3	-	-	-	-	-	Winner	14
Bar	-	-	2	6	-	5	-	1	0	2	-	2	1	-	-	-	-	-	Runner-up	19
Shahaf	-	-	0	1	-	2	-	4	4	1	-	2	0	-	-	-	-	-	Third Place	14
Ilana	-	-	-	2	-	4	-	1	1	0	-	0	0	-	-				Fourth Place	8
Netanel	With Dian						-	2	1	-	-	4	4	-	-	-	-	-	Fifth Place	11
Dror	Not in House								0	1	-	8	2	-	-	-	-	-	Sixth Place	11
Riwa	-	-	4	5	-	1	-	0	0	1	-	3	2	-	-	-	-	-	Evicted	16
Daniel	-	-	0	0	-	0	-	1	3	3	-	1	1	-	-	-	-	Evicted		9
Kazim	-	-	1	1	-	1	-	1	4	-	-	2	3	-	-	-	Evicted			13
Moshe	Not in House							-	0	-	-	1	4	-	-	Evicted				5
Ofek	-	-	2	5	1	1	-	1	3	1	-	3	2	-	Evicted					19
Marina	-	-	0	0	-	0	-	1	1	-	-	0	2	-	Evicted					4
Sharin	-	-	3	3	-	1	-	0	1	2	-	0	1	-	Evicted					11
Lia	Not in House						-	1	3	4	-	1	3	Evicted						12
Dina	-	-	3	1	-	4	-	-	0	2	-	2	Evicted							10
Liran	Not in House						-	9	6	8	-	Evicted								23
David	Not in House						-	1	4	3	Evicted									8
Dana	Not in House						-	5	3	Evicted										8
Dian	With Netanel						-	3	Evicted											3
Dian & Netanel	-	-	4	-	-	2	Split													6
Sharon	-	-	8	-	-	5	Evicted													13
Eliav	-	-	0	0	-	Evicted														0
Diana	-	-	2	6	Evicted															8
Omri	not in house	-	1	Evicted																1
Rachel	-	-	Evicted																	0
