= Big Brother (Israeli TV series) season 13 =

Big Brother
- Season 13
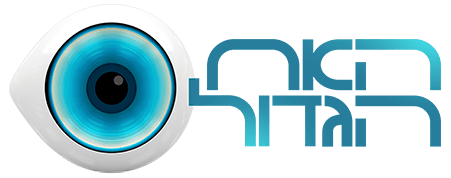
- Presented by: Liron Weizman; Guy Zu-Aretz
- No. of housemates: 27
- Winner: Yuval Maatook
- Runner-up: Stav Katzin

Release
- Original network: Reshet 13
- Original release: 30 May 2023

Season chronology
- ← Previous; Season 12 Next → Season 14

HaAh HaGadol 13 (Hebrew: האח הגדול 13; lit. The Big Brother 13) is the Israeli version of the reality television show Big Brother. The twelfth season premiered on May 30, 2023, on Israeli broadcast channel Reshet 13.

== Housemates ==
16 housemates entered the house on day one, and further participants entered on days three, six, forty and forty-seven.

Name	Age	Occupation / Notability	Residence	Day entered	Day exited	Status
Yuval Maatook	28	Fitness trainer and babysitter Participated in I Can See Your Voice Israel 2	Tel Aviv	1	104	Winner
Stav Katzin	33	Owner of a beauty salon Participated in Beauty and the Geek 4	Ariel	1	104	Runner-up
Yaakov "Yaanki" Goldhaber	20	Haredi Hasidic	Bnei Brak	1	104	Third Place
Snir Nisim Borgil	27	Owner of an aluminum factory, Sapir's brother	Omer	1	104	Fourth Place
Liel Noam Koutzery	29	make-up artist and comb	Tel Aviv	47	104	Fifth Place
Avraham Akelom	27	Security guard and tour guide	Tirat HaCarmel	1	100	18th Evicted
Shay Ofri	23	Insurance worker and eyebrow stylist	Rishon LeZion	1	96	17th Evicted
Eden Shviro	23	Computer science student	Holon	47	89	16th Evicted
Ori Nagar	30	Contractor	Meitar	47	84	Walked
Sapir Borgil	30	Cosmetology student, Snir's sister	Omer	3	82	15th Evicted
Eti Yitav	68	Pensioner of the Ministry of Education	Menahemia	1	75	14th Evicted
Ori Cohen	33	Businessman, Nicole's Boyfriend	Rosh HaAyin	40	75	13th Evicted
Shir Zarfati	25	beautician Participated in Rising Star 5	Kiryat Gat	47	75	12th Evicted
Yuval Levy	32	Artist, sexuality column writer, actress and singer	Jaffa	1	69	11th Evicted
Yair Shlomo Kamkadji	31	Fitness and martial arts master	Herzliya	47	68	10th Evicted
Dana Moshe	21	Influencer; Adopted from Ukraine at age two	Beit She'an	47	65	9th Evicted
Riki Rotter	25	CEO of "Rotter Media", creates, teaches and online viral video creation lectures. She was ultra-orthodox	Bat Yam	47	61	8th Evicted
Ben Wiernik	32	Parquet installer	Alfei Menashe	1	56	Walked
Nicole Ori Botvinik	21	Model, Ori Cohen's Girlfriend	Nesher	1	54	7th Evicted
Lin Alfi	20	Fitness trainer	Herzliya	1	46	Walked
Lara Metodi	55	Owner of a Pilates institute	Ashkelon	1	41	6th Evicted
Guy Eitan	33	Businessman	Tel Aviv	1	35	Walked
Alon Hovel	24	Law student, municipal employee	Ashdod	6	33	5th Evicted
Gal Kaspers	37	Two pilates institutes owner Finalist of MasterChef Israel 8	Herzliya	1	26	4th Evicted
Idan Morad	26	Computer science student	Haifa	1	19	3rd Evicted
Roy Reinisch	26	Communication and business administration student, model	Tel Aviv	1	13	2nd Evicted
Maya Grosman	24	Architecture and interior design student	Ra'anana	6	12	1st Evicted
Non-selected candidates
Ben Strul	26	Barman and entrepreneur	Rishon LeZion	—	6	Not selected

== Nominations Table ==
	Week 1	Week 2	Week 3		Week 4	Week 5	Week 6	Week 7	Week 8	Week 9	Week 10		Week 11		Week 12	Week 13	Week 14	Week 15	Final	
	Week 1	Week 2	Day 13	Day 19	Week 4	Week 5	Week 6	Week 7	Week 8	Week 9	Day 65	Day 68	Day 69	Day 75	Week 12	Week 13	Week 14	Week 15	Final	
Yuval M.	No; Nominations	No; Nominations	No; Nominations	Stav; Avraham	Stav; Avraham	Stav; Avraham	Not; Published	No; Nominations	No; Nominations	Shir; Riki	Exempt	Stav; Shir	Exempt	No; Nominations	No; Nominations	Stav; Eden	Exempt		Winner (Day 104)	
Stav	No; Nominations	No; Nominations	No; Nominations	Nicole; Sapir	Gal; Nicole	Avraham; Nicole	Not; Published	No; Nominations	No; Nominations	Avraham; Sapir	Shay	No; Nominations	No; Nominations	No; Nominations	No; Nominations	Avraham; Shay	No; Nominations	No; Nominations	Runner-up (Day 104)	
Yaanki	No; Nominations	No; Nominations	No; Nominations	Lin; Shay	Guy; Nicole	Guy; Stav	Not; Published	No; Nominations	Nominated	Shir; Yair	Snir	Stav; Shir	No; Nominations	No; Nominations	No; Nominations	Liel; Snir	No; Nominations	No; Nominations	Third Place (Day 104)	
Snir	No; Nominations	No; Nominations	No; Nominations	Stav; Avraham	Stav; Avraham	Stav; Guy	Not; Published	No; Nominations	No; Nominations	Shir; Eden	Eti	Shir; Eden	No; Nominations	No; Nominations	No; Nominations	Stav; Eden	No; Nominations	No; Nominations	Fourth Place (Day 104)	
Liel	Not in House								Exempt	Shir; Riki	Shir	Stav; Shir	No; Nominations	No; Nominations	No; Nominations	Stav; Eden	No; Nominations	No; Nominations	Fifth Place (Day 104)	
Avraham	No; Nominations	No; Nominations	No; Nominations	Alon; Guy	Gal; Guy	Guy; Alon	Not; Published	No; Nominations	Nominated	Ori N. Stav	Ori N.	Stav; Ori N.	No; Nominations	No; Nominations	No; Nominations	Stav; Eden	No; Nominations	No; Nominations	Evicted (Day 100)	
Shay	No; Nominations	No; Nominations	No; Nominations	Yuval L. Stav	Stav; Avraham	Stav; Guy	Not; Published	No; Nominations	Nominated	Yair; Stav	Yuval L.	Stav; Yair	No; Nominations	No; Nominations	No; Nominations	Stav; Liel	No; Nominations	Evicted (Day 96)		
Eden	Not in House								Exempt	Dana; Snir	Avraham	Snir; Ori C.	No; Nominations	No; Nominations	Nominated	Stav; Snir	Evicted (Day 89)			
Ori N.	Not in House								Exempt	Shir; Eden	Sapir	Avraham; Shir	No; Nominations	No; Nominations	No; Nominations	Liel; Eden	Walked (Day 84)			
Sapir	No; Nominations	No; Nominations	No; Nominations	Yuval L. Stav	Lin; Guy	Stav; Yuval L.	Not; Published	No; Nominations	Nominated	Shir; Stav	Yair	Stav; Ori N.	No; Nominations	Exempt	Nominated	Evicted (Day 82)				
Eti	No; Nominations	No; Nominations	No; Nominations	Lin; Guy	Lin; Alon	Guy; Alon	Not; Published	No; Nominations	No; Nominations	Shir; Riki	Nominated	Shir; Eden	No; Nominations	No; Nominations	Evicted (Day 75)					
Ori C.	Not in House						No; Nominations	Exempt	Exempt	Eden; Stav	Stav	Shir; Eden	No; Nominations	No; Nominations	Evicted (Day 75)					
Shir	Not in House								Exempt	Dana; Yair	Dana	Liel; Ori N.	No; Nominations	No; Nominations	Evicted (Day 75)					
Yuval L.	No; Nominations	Nominated	Exempt	Alon; Shay	Guy; Alon	Guy; Alon	Not; Published	No; Nominations	No; Nominations	Shir; Dana	Yaanki	Shir; Ori N.	No; Nominations	Evicted (Day 69)						
Yair	Not in House								Exempt	Dana; Riki	Ori C.	Shir; Shay	Evicted (Day 68)							
Dana	Not in House								Exempt	Shir; Eden	Eden	Evicted (Day 65)								
Riki	Not in House								Exempt	Liel; Yair	Evicted (Day 61)									
Ben W.	No; Nominations	No; Nominations	No; Nominations	Stav; Avraham	Stav; Avraham	Stav; Yuval L.	Not; Published	No; Nominations	Nominated	No; Nominations	Walked (Day 56)									
Nicole	No; Nominations	No; Nominations	No; Nominations	Stav; Avraham	Stav; Avraham	Stav; Yuval L.	Not; Published	No; Nominations	Nominated	Evicted (Day 54)										
Lin	No; Nominations	No; Nominations	No; Nominations	Idan; Avraham	Stav; Avraham	Stav; Alon	Not; Published	No; Nominations	Walked (Day 46)											
Lara	No; Nominations	No; Nominations	No; Nominations	Eti; Stav	Stav; Avraham	Stav; Yuval L.	Not; Published	No; Nominations	Evicted (Day 41)											
Guy	No; Nominations	No; Nominations	No; Nominations	Stav; Shay	Yuval L. Eti	Yuval L. Snir	No; Nominations	Walked (Day 35)												
Alon	Not in House	No; Nominations	No; Nominations	Stav; Avraham	Stav; Avraham	Stav; Yuval L.	Evicted (Day 33)													
Gal	No; Nominations	No; Nominations	No; Nominations	Eti; Avraham	Eti; Lin	Evicted (Day 26)														
Idan	No; Nominations	No; Nominations	No; Nominations	Guy; Shay	Evicted (Day 19)															
Roy	No; Nominations	No; Nominations	No; Nominations	Evicted (Day 13)																
Maya	Not in House	Yuval L.	Evicted (Day 12)																	
Housemates who did not enter the house
Ben S.	Not in House	did not enter the house (Day 6)																		
Note																				
Nominated (pre-save and replace)	none	none	none	Alon; Avraham; Eti; Gal; Guy; Lin; Shay; Stav; Yuval L.	none	none	Eti; Lin; Shay; Snir; Yaanki; Yuval L.	none	none	Dana; Eden; Riki; Shir; Stav; Yair	none	none	none	All; Housemates	All; Housemates	Eden; Liel; Ori N. Snir; Stav	All; Housemates	none		
Against public vote	none	Maya; Yuval L.	All; Housemates expect of Yuval L.	Alon; Avraham; Eti; Gal; Guy; Idan; Lin; Stav; Yuval L.	Alon; Avraham; Eti; Gal; Guy; Lin; Nicole; Stav	Alon; Avraham; Guy; Stav; Yuval L.	Avraham; Lin; Nicole; Stav; Yaanki; Yuval L.	All; Housemates expect of Ori C.	Avraham; Ben W. Nicole; Sapir; Shay; Yaanki	Avraham; Eden; Riki; Shir; Stav; Yair	All; Housemates expect of Yuval M.	Eden; Ori N. Shir; Stav; Yair	All; Housemates expect of Yuval M.	All; Housemates expect of Sapir	Eden; Sapir	Eden; Liel; Snir; Stav	All; Housemates expect of Yuval M.	All; Housemates expect of Yuval M.		
Walked	none	none					Guy	Lin	none	Ben W.	none					Ori N.	none			
Evicted	none	Maya; Fewest votes to save	Roy; Fewest votes to save	Idan; Fewest votes to save	Gal; Fewest votes to save	Alon; Fewest votes to save	Nicole fake evict	Lara; Fewest votes to save	Nicole; Fewest votes to save	Riki; Fewest votes to save	Dana; Fewest votes to save	Yair; Fewest votes to save	Yuval L. Fewest votes to save	Shir; Fewest votes to save	Sapir; Fewest votes to save	Eden; Fewest votes to save	Shay; Fewest votes to save	Avraham; Fewest votes to save	Liel; Fewest votes (out of 5)	Snir; Fewest votes (out of 4)
Evicted	none	Maya; Fewest votes to save	Roy; Fewest votes to save	Idan; Fewest votes to save	Gal; Fewest votes to save	Alon; Fewest votes to save	Nicole fake evict	Lara; Fewest votes to save	Nicole; Fewest votes to save	Riki; Fewest votes to save	Dana; Fewest votes to save	Yair; Fewest votes to save	Yuval L. Fewest votes to save	Ori C. Fewest votes to save	Sapir; Fewest votes to save	Eden; Fewest votes to save	Shay; Fewest votes to save	Avraham; Fewest votes to save	Yaanki; Fewest votes (out of 3)	Stav; Fewest votes (out of 2)
Evicted	none	Maya; Fewest votes to save	Roy; Fewest votes to save	Idan; Fewest votes to save	Gal; Fewest votes to save	Alon; Fewest votes to save	Nicole fake evict	Lara; Fewest votes to save	Nicole; Fewest votes to save	Riki; Fewest votes to save	Dana; Fewest votes to save	Yair; Fewest votes to save	Yuval L. Fewest votes to save	Eti; Fewest votes to save	Sapir; Fewest votes to save	Eden; Fewest votes to save	Shay; Fewest votes to save	Avraham; Fewest votes to save	Yuval M. Most votes to win	

== Nominations totals received ==
	Week 1	Week 2	Week 3		Week 4	Week 5	Week 6	Week 7	Week 8	Week 9	Week 10		Week 11		Week 12	Week 13	Week 14	Week 15	Final	Total
Yuval M.	—	—	—	0	0	0	—	—	—	0	0	0	—	—	—	0	—		Winner	0
Stav	—	—	—	9	8	10	—	—	—	4	1	7	—	—	—	7	—	—	Runner-up	46
Yaanki	—	—	—	0	0	0	—	—	—	0	1	0	—	—	—	0	—	—	Third Place	1
Snir	—	—	—	0	0	1	—	—	—	1	1	1	—	—	—	2	—	—	Fourth Place	6
Liel	Not In House								—	1	1	1	—	—	—	3	—	—	Fifth Place	6
Avraham	—	—	—	7	8	2	—	—	—	1	1	1	—	—	—	1	—	—	Evicted	21
Shay	—	—	—	4	0	0	—	—	—	0	1	1	—	—	—	1	—	Evicted		7
Eden	Not In House								—	4	1	3	—	—	—	6	Evicted			14
Ori N.	Not In House								—	1	1	4	—	—	—	—	Walked			6
Sapir	—	—	—	1	0	0	—	—	—	1	1	0	—	—	—	Evicted				3
Eti	—	—	—	2	2	0	—	—	—	0	1	0	—	—	Evicted					5
Ori C.	not in house						—	—	—	0	1	1	—	—	Evicted					2
Shir	Not In House								—	9	1	9	—	—	Evicted					19
Yuval L.	—	1	—	2	1	6	—	—	—	0	1	0	—	Evicted						11
Yair	Not In House								—	4	1	2	Evicted							7
Dana	Not In House								—	4	1	Evicted								5
Riki	Not In House								—	4	Evicted									4
Ben W.	—	—	—	0	0	0	—	—	—	—	Walked									0
Nicole	—	—	—	1	2	1	—	—	—	Evicted										4
Lin	—	—	—	2	3	—	—	—	Walked											5
Lara	—	—	—	0	0	0	—	—	Evicted											0
Guy	—	—	—	3	4	6	—	Walked												13
Alon	not in house	—	—	2	2	4	Evicted													8
Gal	—	—	—	—	2	Evicted														2
Idan	—	—	—	2	Evicted															2
Roy	—	—	—	Evicted																—
Maya	not in house	—	Evicted																	—
Ben S.	not in house	did not enter the house																		—
