= Big Brother (Israeli TV series) season 11 =

Big Brother
- Season 11
- Presented by: Liron Weizman; Guy Zu-Aretz
- No. of days: 108
- No. of housemates: 24
- Winner: Zehava Ben
- Runner-up: Jonathan "Joezi" Zirah
- No. of episodes: 63 (Note: Include one reunion episode.)

Release
- Original network: Reshet 13
- Original release: 5 December 2020 – 22 March 2021

Season chronology
- ← Previous; Season 10 Next → Season 12

HaAh HaGadol 11 (Hebrew: האח הגדול 11; lit. The Big Brother 11) is the eleventh season of the Israeli version of the reality show Big Brother. Applications for this season started after the season 10 finale ended on 4 April 2020. The season premiered on 5 December 2020 on Reshet 13.

Liron Weizman and Guy Zu-Aretz co-host the show. In addition, the former housemate, Avivit Bar Zohar, is featured as the "Digital Sister" for this season.

In this season, there would be celebrities who live in the house alongside civilian housemates.

Due to the COVID-19 pandemic, for the first time, official housemates were required to be in quarantine for two weeks rather than normally for two to three days as in previous seasons. The housemates did the first week of quarantine in their own house and the second week in the hotel. In addition, all the housemates must do a corona test before entering the quarantine. There would also be no live audience like the later weeks of previous season.

It was the second time, the opening event was split into two.

The finale was on 22 March 2021, and the winner was Zehava Ben.

== Housemates ==
Ten housemates entered the house on Day 1 and eight housemates entered the house on Day 2. Six housemates entered the house on Day 58.

| Name | Age | Type | Occupation/Notability | Residence | Day entered | Day exited | Status |
|---|---|---|---|---|---|---|---|
| Zehava Ben | 52 | Celebrity | Singer | Rishon LeZion | 1 | 108 | Winner |
| Jonathan "Joezi" Zirah | 33 | Celebrity | Reality star, participated in HaMerotz LaMillion 5 and Survivor VIP 2 | Tel Aviv | 1 | 108 | Runner-up |
| Tom Haimoff | 33 | Civilian | Lawyer | Tel Aviv | 2 | 108 | Third Place |
| Karin Alia | 22 | Celebrity | Model, actress, and Miss Israel 2016 | Tel Aviv | 1 | 108 | Fourth Place |
| Oren Asido | 27 | Celebrity | Chef, Game of Chefs 3 winner | Kefar Saba | 58 | 108 | Fifth Place |
| Almog Hadad | 25 | Civilian | Butcher | Rishon LeZion | 58 | 108 | Sixth Place |
| Rami Vered | 56 | Celebrity | Actor, comedian, screenwriter and playwright | Petah Tikva | 1 | 106 | Evicted |
| Daniel Levin | 33 | Civilian | Lawyer | Tel Aviv | 58 | 104 | Evicted |
| Lior Eli Halfon | 47 | Celebrity | Actor, comedian, artist, director and entrepreneur | Binyamina | 1 | 99 | Evicted |
| Yehuda Itzhakov | 31 | Civilian | Engineer and reality show Mission: Amazon winner | Holon | 2 | 90 | Ejected |
| Ofir Levi | 48 | Civilian | Clalit Health Services's spokesman | Rosh HaAyin | 58 | 85 | Evicted |
| Dror Kontento | 34 | Celebrity | Wedding dress designer | Bat Yam | 1 | 81 | Walked |
| Linor Sabinik | 25 | Civilian | Nutritionist | Azor | 2 | 78 | Evicted |
| Noa Yonani | 31 | Celebrity | Jurist, participated in New Love | Tel Aviv | 58 | 78 | Evicted |
| Gal Gvaram | 19 | Celebrity | IDF soldier, model and news anchor, participated in The Boys and The Girls 3 | Netanya | 1 | 71 | Evicted |
| Dalit Davidov | 37 | Civilian | Swimsuit shop owner | Holon | 58 | 64 | Evicted |
| Yamit Aavramov | 38 | Civilian | Former Head of the office of Minister Orly Levy-Abekasis | Jerusalem | 2 | 50 | Evicted |
| Eilon Ekon | 31 | Civilian | Lawyer | Herzliya | 2 | 43 | Evicted |
| Ronit Levi | 51 | Civilian | Likud Social network activist | Afula | 2 | 36 | Evicted |
| Shulamit "Shula" Zaken | 63 | Celebrity | Head of office of Prime Minister Ehud Olmert | Jerusalem | 1 | 27 | Evicted |
| Mor Lerman | 33 | Celebrity | Fashion designer and lawyer, participated in Married at First Sight 3 | Ramat Gan | 1 | 22 | Evicted |
| David Demos | 35 | Civilian | Lifeguard | Eilat | 2 | 15 | Evicted |
| Yehezkel "Bagdadi" (Tzur) | 65 | Civilian | Pensioner | Rehovot | 1 | 8 | Evicted |
| Elimelech Kashty | 36 | Civilian | Contractor and a flooring company owner | Tel Aviv | 2 | 5 | Ejected |

== Nominations table ==
In this season, most nominations were made in public rather than in the Big Brother Room (Diary Room).

| | Week 1 | Week 2 | Week 3 | Week 4 | Week 5 | | Week 6 | Week 7 | Week 8 | Week 9 | | Week 10 | Week 11 | | Week 12 | Week 13 | Week 14 | Week 15 | | Final | |
| | Week 1 | Week 2 | Week 3 | Week 4 | Day 30 Duel | Day 34 | Week 6 | Week 7 | Week 8 | Day 62 | Day 64 | Week 10 | Day 76 | Day 78 | Week 12 | Week 13 | Week 14 | Day 104 | Day 106 | Final | |
|---|---|---|---|---|---|---|---|---|---|---|---|---|---|---|---|---|---|---|---|---|---|
| Zehava | Bagdadi; Eilon | Rami; Yehuda | Banned | No; Nominations | Won; Duel | Exempt | Eilon; Linor | Exempt | Lior | Banned | No; Nominations | No; Nominations | Banned | Not; Eligible | No; Nominations | No; Nominations | No; Nominations | No; Nominations | No; Nominations | Winner (Day 108) | |
| Joezi | Eilon; Bagdadi | Tom; Shula | Shula; Mor | No; Nominations | Lost; Duel | Nominated | Linor; Rami | Exempt | Rami | Rami; Linor | No; Nominations | Nominated | Linor; Ofir | Not; Eligible | No; Nominations | No; Nominations | No; Nominations | No; Nominations | No; Nominations | Runner-up (Day 108) | |
| Tom | Bagdadi; Eilon | Eilon; Yehuda | Rami; Joezi | No; Nominations | Won; Duel | Exempt | Eilon; Yamit | Nominated | Yehuda | Dalit; Noa | No; Nominations | Saved | Ofir; Noa | Not; Eligible | No; Nominations | No; Nominations | No; Nominations | No; Nominations | No; Nominations | Third Place (Day 108) | |
| Karin | Eilon; Lior | Eilon; Ronit | Shula; Eilon | No; Nominations | Lost; Duel | Nominated | Eilon; Yamit | Exempt | Yehuda | Noa; Yehuda | No; Nominations | No; Nominations | Ofir; Daniel | Not; Eligible | No; Nominations | No; Nominations | Exempt | No; Nominations | No; Nominations | Fourth Place (Day 108) | |
| Oren | Not in House | | | | | | | | | Ofir; Daniel | No; Nominations | No; Nominations | Karin | Not; Eligible | No; Nominations | No; Nominations | No; Nominations | No; Nominations | No; Nominations | Fifth Place (Day 108) | |
| Almog | Not in House | | | | | | | | | Ofir; Rami | No; Nominations | No; Nominations | Ofir; Daniel | Not; Eligible | No; Nominations | No; Nominations | No; Nominations | No; Nominations | No; Nominations | Sixth Place (Day 108) | |
| Rami | Tom; Linor | Yehuda; Zehava | Eilon; Yehuda | No; Nominations | Won; Duel | Yehuda | Eilon; Lior | Exempt | Yehuda | Yehuda; Joezi | No; Nominations | No; Nominations | Yehuda; Noa | Not; Eligible | No; Nominations | No; Nominations | No; Nominations | No; Nominations | No; Nominations | Evicted (Day 106) | |
| Daniel | Not in House | | | | | | | | | Dalit; Noa | No; Nominations | No; Nominations | Almog; Noa | Not; Eligible | No; Nominations | No; Nominations | No; Nominations | No; Nominations | Evicted (Day 104) | | |
| Lior | Remi; David | David | Yehuda; Karin | No; Nominations | No; Nominations | Not; Eligible | Eilon; Gal | Nominated | Yehuda | Yehuda; Dalit | No; Nominations | Nominated | Noa; Ofir | Almog | No; Nominations | No; Nominations | No; Nominations | Evicted (Day 99) | | | |
| Yehuda | David; Tom | Banned | Banned | No; Nominations | No; Nominations | Not; Eligible | Tom; Gal | Exempt | Rami | Banned | No; Nominations | Nominated | Banned | Not; Eligible | No; Nominations | Ejected (Day 90) | | | | | |
| Ofir | Not in House | | | | | | | | | Noa; Oren | No; Nominations | No; Nominations | Noa; Linor | Not; Eligible | No; Nominations | Evicted (Day 85) | | | | | |
| Dror | David; Bagdadi | Linor; Ronit | Joezi; Linor | No; Nominations | No; Nominations | Not; Eligible | Yehuda | Exempt | Joezi | Daniel; Noa | No; Nominations | No; Nominations | Ofir; Daniel | Not; Eligible | Walked (Day 81) | | | | | | |
| Linor | Eilon; Lior | Mor; Rami | Shula; Yehuda | No; Nominations | Won; Duel | Exempt | Eilon; Joezi | Exempt | Yehuda | Yehuda; Joezi | No; Nominations | No; Nominations | Ofir; Daniel | Not; Eligible | Evicted (Day 78) | | | | | | |
| Noa | Not in House | | | | | | | | | Ofir; Karin | No; Nominations | No; Nominations | Ofir; Tom | Evicted (Day 78) | | | | | | | |
| Gal | Eilon; Yehuda | Eilon; Yehuda | Shula; Yehuda | No; Nominations | No; Nominations | Not; Eligible | Eilon; Lior | Nominated | Yehuda | Ofir; Yehuda | No; Nominations | Nominated | Evicted (Day 71) | | | | | | | | |
| Dalit | Not in House | | | | | | | | | Lior; Dror | Evicted (Day 64) | | | | | | | | | | |
| Yamit | Bagdadi; Ronit | Rami; Ronit | Ronit | No; Nominations | No; Nominations | Not; Eligible | Eilon; Rami | Nominated | Evicted (Day 50) | | | | | | | | | | | | |
| Eilon | David; Zehava | Tom; Mor | Shula; Mor | No; Nominations | Lost; Duel | Nominated | Karin; Rami | Evicted (Day 43) | | | | | | | | | | | | | |
| Ronit | Bagdadi; Yamit | Yamit; Shula | Karin; Shula | No; Nominations | Lost; Duel | Nominated | Evicted (Day 36) | | | | | | | | | | | | | | |
| Shula | Eilon; Ronit | Ronit; Joezi | Karin; Mor | No; Nominations | Evicted (Day 27) | | | | | | | | | | | | | | | | |
| Mor | Eilon; Ronit | Eilon; Linor | Eilon; Joezi | Evicted (Day 22) | | | | | | | | | | | | | | | | | |
| David | Eilon; Bagdadi | Yehuda; Joezi | Evicted (Day 15) | | | | | | | | | | | | | | | | | | |
| Bagdadi | Zehava; Tom | Evicted (Day 8) | | | | | | | | | | | | | | | | | | | |
| Elimelech | Ejected (Day 5) | | | | | | | | | | | | | | | | | | | | |
| Note | 1, 2 | 3, 4 | 3, 5, 6 | 7 | 8, 9 | 10 | 11, 12 | 13 | 14 | 3, 6 | 15 | 16 | 17 | | 18 | 19 | 20 | | | | |
| Head of House | none | Lior | Yamit | none | | Rami | Dror | none | Tom | none | | | Oren | none | | | | | | | |
| Against public vote | Bagdadi; David; Eilon; Ronit; Shula; Tom | David; Eilon; Gal; Jozie; Rami; Ronit; Yehuda | Eilon; Josie; Karin; Mor; Ronit; Shula; Yehuda | All; Housemates | Eilon ↔ ~~Zehava~~; ~~Linor~~ ↔ Karin; Ronit ↔ ~~Rami~~; ~~Tom~~ ↔ Joezi; Yehuda | | Eilon; Rami; Yehuda | Gal; Lior; Tom; Yamit | All Hosmates excluding Tom | Dalit; Noa; Ofir; Yehuda | Dror; Gal; Joezi; Karin; Linor; Lior; Rami; Tom; Yehuda; Zehava | Gal; Joezi; Lior; Yehuda | Daniel; Linor; Karin; Noa; Ofir | Almog; Daniel; Karin; Linor; Oren; Yehuda; Zahava | All; Housemates | none | Almog; Daniel; Joezi; Lior; Oren; Rami; Tom; Zehava | All; Housemates | | | |
| Walked | none | | | | | | | | | | | | | | Dror | none | | | | | |
| Ejected | Elimelech | none | | | | | | | | | | | | | | Yehuda | none | | | | |
| Evicted | Bagdadi; Most votes to evict | David; Most votes to evict | Mor; Most votes to evict | Shula; Rami's choice (out of 2) to evict | Ronit; Most votes to evict | | Eilon; Most votes to evict | Yamit; Most votes to evict | Yehuda; 6 of 10 votes to fake evict | Dalit; Most votes to evict | Linor; Most votes to evict but saved | Gal; Most votes to evict | Noa; Most votes to evict | Linor; Most votes to evict | Ofir; Most votes to evict | No; Eviction | Lior; Most votes to evict | Daniel; Most votes to evict | Rami; Most votes to evict | Almog; Fewest votes (out of 6) | Oren; Fewest votes (out of 5) |
| Evicted | Bagdadi; Most votes to evict | David; Most votes to evict | Mor; Most votes to evict | Shula; Rami's choice (out of 2) to evict | Ronit; Most votes to evict | | Eilon; Most votes to evict | Yamit; Most votes to evict | Yehuda; 6 of 10 votes to fake evict | Dalit; Most votes to evict | Linor; Most votes to evict but saved | Gal; Most votes to evict | Noa; Most votes to evict | Linor; Most votes to evict | Ofir; Most votes to evict | No; Eviction | Lior; Most votes to evict | Daniel; Most votes to evict | Rami; Most votes to evict | Karin; Fewest votes (out of 4) | Tom; Fewest votes (out of 3) |
| Evicted | Bagdadi; Most votes to evict | David; Most votes to evict | Mor; Most votes to evict | Shula; Rami's choice (out of 2) to evict | Ronit; Most votes to evict | | Eilon; Most votes to evict | Yamit; Most votes to evict | Yehuda; 6 of 10 votes to fake evict | Dalit; Most votes to evict | Linor; Most votes to evict but saved | Gal; Most votes to evict | Noa; Most votes to evict | Linor; Most votes to evict | Ofir; Most votes to evict | No; Eviction | Lior; Most votes to evict | Daniel; Most votes to evict | Rami; Most votes to evict | Joezi; Fewest votes (out of 2) | Zehava; Most votes to win |

=== Notes ===
- ^1 : Yehezkel Bagdadi was the first civilian housemate to enter the house on the first opening event on Day 1. He was given a secret mission to rescues one of the celebrity housemates on the swamp and move into the house after viewing all the celebrities' profile videos, but this housemate would also automatically enter the nomination list. He chose to rescue Shula, therefore, Shula was automatically nominated.
- ^2 : On Day 5, it was announced that following Elimelech's legal affairs, productions decided to remove him from the house later that night.
- ^3 : Following the "Hanukkah Games" mission, it was determined that until a new announcement, Yehuda will not be able to nominate.
- ^4 : Lior was elected the Head of House this week. As part of his role, he nominated David.
- ^5 : After the nomination, it was decided that the facilitators would call the house phone, and the person who answered the phone would be informed that he/she would also be nominated. Joezi answered the phone call, and as a result, he automatically nominated.
- ^6 : Following the telephone assignment, it was determined that due to the low budget, the Head of House Yamit would have to choose one housemate who could not nominate until further notice, and Yamit chose Zehava.
- ^7 : As part of the surprise eviction this week, viewers were informed that all housemates were nominated for eviction. On Wednesday, Karin and Shula were the two who received the fewest votes. And on Thursday, the house phone called, Remi, who answered the phone, had to choose which one of the two should stay or leave. Remi chose Karin to stay and Shula to leave.
- ^8 : On Day 27, New Year's Eve, Eilon, Linor, Ronit and Tom disappeared from the house. Big Brother informed them that according to the audience's decision: Eilon is the least caring housemate, Linor the least interesting housemate, Ronit the least sensitive housemate and Tom the least real housemate. They have automatically entered the eviction list.
- ^9 : On Day 30, Eilon, Linor, Ronit and Tom returned to the house after 2 days of disappearance, a series of duel happened to them as part of the "mission of disappearing". Each of them will summon a different housemate of their choice to a duel and the viewers will determine who wins and saved from the eviction list. Tom chosen to duel with Joezi, they face off head-to-head in a duel over the question "Who is the most real housemate?". After Tom and Josie answered the questions, the viewers voted for Tom. Josie replaced Tom on the eviction list. Ronit duel with Rami. After the mission, the viewers voted for Rami. Ronit remained on the eviction list. Linor duel with Karin. The viewers voted for Linor. Karin replaced Linor on the eviction list. Eilon duel with Zehava. After the duel, Zehava defeats Eilon and wins the title of the caring housemate. Eilon remained on the eviction list.
- ^10 : Rami was elected Head of House this week. As part of the job, he was given the power to add another housemate to the eviction list and he chose Yehuda.
- ^11 : Following the "Yes, No, 5" task, the silence of Yehuda and Zehava was canceled this week, Eilon was not automatically nominated and the nomination was not held publicly.
- ^12 : Dror was elected Head of House this week. As part of the job, he was given the power to add another housemate to the eviction list and he chose Yehuda.
- ^13 : In this week, instead of nominating for eviction, the housemates were voted for the housemate who they wanted to receive immunity. The housemates who didn’t receive any votes were up for eviction. In the end, Gal, Lior, Tom and Yamit were nominated for eviction.
- ^14 : In this fake eviction on Day 57, all housemates were put up for eviction except for Tom who was elected Head of House and granted immunity. Each housemate chose the one they would like to see leave the house. The housemate selected by a majority vote will be fake evicted and will stay in the suite until the second entrance event. The housemate was Yehuda.
- ^15 : After the eviction of Dalit, the housemates were asked if they would like a visit with a family member of one of the housemates in exchange for another eviction in which only the old housemates will be nominated. The housemates accepted to have a second eviction. In this eviction, the housemate who received the most votes would be evicted, the person was Linor. However, on the stage, she won a golden ticket and was saved from the eviction. She returned to the house immediately.
- ^16 : This week, there was a mission related to an apocalypse caused by a radioactive leak, and the housemates who volunteered to put in goods from outside “got infected” and automatically entered the eviction list, and therefore, the other housemates did not put up for eviction. Instead, they decided which of the five nominees (Gal, Joezi, Lior, Tom and Yehuda) to grant immunity and the housemates chose Tom.
- ^17 : This week there were two evictions in one night. For the second eviction, the nominees were selected randomly. All housemates in pair of two enter the large fireplace room where two fortune cookies were placed, in one cookie, it was written that the housemate was a nominee for eviction and in the other cookie, it was written that the housemate was not a nominee for eviction. As a result, the eviction list was determined, which included Daniel, Linor and Karin, Oren, Yehuda and Zehava. Lior, who was left without a partner. He entered the fireplace room, where he had to choose between the two cookies. Lior survived the nomination but had to nominate someone else of his choice. Lior chose Almog, she was also nominated.
- ^18 : Dror voluntarily left the show for personal reasons.
- ^19 : Yehuda was removed from the Big Brother house due to violated the house rules. During the season Yehuda received a warning for a similar violation and it was decided that Yehuda would not be able to continue being a housemate in the house.
- ^20 : Following a mission, Karin was granted immunity from eviction.
- ^21 : The public were voting to win rather than to evict.

== Nominations totals received ==
| | Week 1 | Week 2 | Week 3 | Week 4 | Week 5 | Week 6 | Week 7 | Week 8 | Week 9 | | Week 10 | Week 11 | | Week 12 | Week 13 | Week 14 | Week 15 | | Final | Total |
|---|---|---|---|---|---|---|---|---|---|---|---|---|---|---|---|---|---|---|---|---|
| Zehava | 2 | 1 | 0 | - | - | 0 | 1 | 0 | 0 | - | - | 0 | - | - | - | - | - | - | Winner | 3 |
| Joezi | 0 | 2 | 3 | - | - | 1 | 2 | 1 | 0 | - | - | 0 | - | - | - | - | - | - | Runner-up | 9 |
| Tom | 3 | 2 | 0 | - | - | 1 | 0 | - | 0 | - | - | 1 | - | - | - | - | - | - | Third Place | 7 |
| Karin | 0 | 0 | 3 | - | - | 1 | 1 | 0 | 1 | - | - | 1 | - | - | - | - | - | - | Fourth Place | 6 |
| Oren | Not in House | | | | | | | | 1 | - | - | - | - | - | - | - | - | - | Fifth Place | 1 |
| Almog | Not in House | | | | | | | | 0 | - | - | 1 | 1 | - | - | - | - | - | Sixth Place | 2 |
| Rami | 0 | 3 | 1 | - | - | 3 | 2 | 2 | 2 | - | - | 0 | - | - | - | - | - | - | Evicted | 12 |
| Daniel | Not in House | | | | | | | | 2 | - | - | 4 | - | - | - | - | - | Evicted | | 6 |
| Lior | 2 | - | 0 | - | - | 2 | 0 | 1 | 1 | - | - | 0 | - | - | - | - | Evicted | | | 6 |
| Yehuda | 1 | 5 | 4 | - | 1 | 1 | 3 | 6 | 5 | - | - | 1 | - | - | Ejected | | | | | 26 |
| Ofir | Not in House | | | | | | | | 4 | - | - | 8 | - | - | Evicted | | | | | 12 |
| Dror | - | 0 | 0 | - | - | - | 1 | 0 | 1 | - | - | 0 | - | - | Walked | | | | | 1 |
| Linor | 1 | 2 | 1 | - | - | 2 | 1 | 0 | 1 | - | - | 2 | - | Evicted | | | | | | 9 |
| Noa | Not in House | | | | | | | | 5 | - | - | 5 | Evicted | | | | | | | 10 |
| Gal | - | - | 0 | - | - | 2 | 0 | 0 | 0 | - | - | Evicted | | | | | | | | 2 |
| Dalit | Not in House | | | | | | | | 3 | Evicted | | | | | | | | | | 3 |
| Yamit | 1 | 1 | - | - | - | 2 | 0 | Evicted | | | | | | | | | | | | 4 |
| Eilon | 9 | 4 | 4 | - | - | 8 | Evicted | | | | | | | | | | | | | 25 |
| Ronit | 3 | 4 | 1 | - | - | Evicted | | | | | | | | | | | | | | 8 |
| Shula | - | 2 | 6 | - | Evicted | | | | | | | | | | | | | | | 8 |
| Mor | 0 | 2 | 3 | Evicted | | | | | | | | | | | | | | | | 5 |
| David | 4 | 1 | Evicted | | | | | | | | | | | | | | | | | 5 |
| Bagdadi | 7 | Evicted | | | | | | | | | | | | | | | | | | 7 |
| Elimelech | Ejected | | | | | | | | | | | | | | | | | | | N/A |
