= Big Brother (Israeli TV series) season 14 =

Big Brother
- Season 14
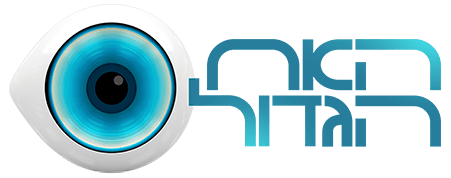
- Presented by: Liron Weizman; Guy Zu-Aretz
- No. of housemates: 29
- Winner: Or Ben-David
- Runner-up: Frida Uziel

Release
- Original network: Reshet 13
- Original release: 2 June 2024

Season chronology
- ← Previous; Season 13 Next → Season 15

HaAh HaGadol 14 (Hebrew: האח הגדול 14; lit. The Big Brother 14) is the Israeli version of the reality television show Big Brother. The twelfth season premiered on June 2, 2024, on Israeli broadcast channel Reshet 13.

== Housemates ==
12 housemates entered the house on Day 1 and 6 housemates entered the house on Day 2. further participants entered on days four, seven, twenty-four and thirty-five. The "2nd enter" housemates entered the house on day fifty.

Name	Age	Occupation / Notability	Residence	Day entered	Day exited	Status
Or Ben David	29	Darbuka player	Rishon LeZion	1	112	Winner
Frida Ziv Uziel	25	Network coordinator and social manager Participated in HaKokhav HaBa seasons 6 & 10	Tel Aviv, Originally from Netivot	1	112	Runner-up
Yossi Parienti	29	Buffet owner Participated in Games of Chefs season 5	Lod	7	112	Third Place
Hadar Shiri	24	Eyeglass store owner	Ramat Gan	1	112	Fourth Place
Noam Madar	24	Guard, Barak's twin	Netivot	1	112	Fifth Place
Dani Chervonenko	29	Model, jewelry designer and former footballer	Haifa	1	109	23rd Evicted
Derrick Jr. "DJ" Sharp	27	Basketball player Son of basketball player Derrick Sharp	Herzliya	50	105	22nd Evicted
Melanie Lemberski	24	Singer, actress behind the AI character Gaya Harel	Haifa	24	103	21st Evicted
Michal Moshaiov	35	Assistant vice president of Israel Railways infrastructure Former worker of ministers Gila Gamliel and Gilad Erdan	Herzliya	50	102	20th Evicted
Shilo Shalom	27	Kart racer, Real Estate worker and candle maker	Tel Aviv, originally from Or Yehuda	50	98	19th Evicted
Emily Kuper	21	Singer, model, network star and voice development teacher Participated in The Voice Russia season 8 & Israel's Got Talent season 2	Ashdod	1	91	18th Evicted
Haim Twito	29	Editor	Netanya	1	88	17th Evicted
Einav Sherry	24	Social manager	Tel Aviv, originally from Tel Mond	7	84	16th Evicted
Idan Gelfer	29	Programmer	Ashdod	46	77	15th Evicted
Idan Gelfer	29	Programmer	Ashdod	1	30	6th Evicted
Itzik Amram	38	Sales agent	Ariel	50	70	14th Evicted
Keren Uzan	25	Electricity company operator	Savyon	50	63	13th Evicted
Coralie "Coco" Yasmin Larusee	31	Barwoman and selector, participated in The X Factor Israel	Tel Aviv	1	58	12th Evicted
Ben Adam	35	Actor, artist, teacher and activist Participated in Galis	Tel Aviv	1	49	11th Evicted
Mali Kliger	23	Urban Renewal Directorate	Beitar Ilit	35	49	10th Evicted
Zahi Peleg	50	Hair solutions business owner, TikToker and former forecaster	Kfar Yona, originally from Kiryat Ata	35	42	9th Evicted
Yahav Erhabor	26	A clothing store salesman, TikToker and former soccer player	Ramle	4	36	8th Evicted
Barak Madar	24	Guard, Noam's twin	Netivot	1	32	7th Evicted
Orit Tangi	61	School assistant, Liron's mother	Ashkelon	2	28	5th Evicted
Dana Ben Shoshan	41	Unemployed; Participated in MasterChef Israel season 11	Eilon	2	24	4th Evicted
Tom Bracha	41	Nightlife man	Tel Aviv	2	21	3rd Evicted
Liron Tangi	31	Make up artist, Orit's daughter	Ashkelon	2	16	2nd Evicted
Dinor Avshayev	26	Bookkeeper	Netanya	2	8	1st Evicted
Fake housemate(s)
Gaya Harel	26	Fashion designer	Herzliya	1	4	Left
Yehuda Ohayon	28	Installs boilers	Emunim	2	4	Left

== Nominations Table ==
	Week 1	Week 2	Week 3	Week 4		Week 5		Week 6		Week 7		Week 8	Week 9	Week 10	Week 11	Week 12	Week 13		Week 14	Week 15			Week 16	Week 16 Final	
	Week 1	Week 2	Week 3	Day 24	Day 27	Day 30	Day 32	Day 36	Day 42	Day 49	Day 49	Week 8	Week 9	Week 10	Week 11	Week 12	Day 88	Day 91	Week 14	Day 102	Day 103	Day 105	Week 16	Week 16 Final	
Or	Dinor; Ben	Yahav; Einav	Hadar; Tom	No; Nominations	Nominated	Exempt	Exempt	Yahav; Hadar	Coralie; Noam	Noam; Coralie	No; Nominations	Nominated	Exempt	No; Nominations	Hadar; Shilo	Nominated	No; Nominations	No; Nominations	No; Nominations	Hadar; Noam	No; Nominations	No; Nominations	No; Nominations	Winner (Day 112)	
Frida	Hadar; Or	Orit; Hadar	Tom; Hadar	No; Nominations	Yahav; Hadar	No; Nominations	No; Nominations	Hadar; Emily	Emily; Einav	Hadar; Noam	No; Nominations	Nominated	Exempt	No; Nominations	Haim; Shilo	Exempt	No; Nominations	No; Nominations	No; Nominations	Dani; Or	No; Nominations	No; Nominations	No; Nominations	Runner-up (Day 112)	
Yossi	Not in House	Einav; Ben	Orit; Haim	No; Nominations	No; Nominations	Nominated	Exempt	Melanie; Coralie	Coralie; Haim	Mali; Coralie	No; Nominations	No; Nominations	Exempt	No; Nominations	Shilo; Dani	Nominated	No; Nominations	No; Nominations	Exempt	Michal; DJ	Exempt	Exempt	Exempt	Third Place (Day 112)	
Hadar	Liron; Orit	Orit; Dani	Orit; Or	No; Nominations	Dani; Coralie	No; Nominations	Exempt	Dani; Or	Coralie; Dani	Melanie; Coralie	No; Nominations	No; Nominations	Exempt	No; Nominations	Melanie; Michal	Nominated	No; Nominations	No; Nominations	No; Nominations	Michal; Dani	No; Nominations	No; Nominations	No; Nominations	Fourth Place (Day 112)	
Noam	Dinor; Liron	Orit; Liron	Einav; Or	No; Nominations	Or; Einav	No; Nominations	No; Nominations	Or; Einav	Or	Or; Emily	No; Nominations	Nominated	Exempt	No; Nominations	Shilo; Einav	No; Nominations	No; Nominations	No; Nominations	No; Nominations	Or; Dani	No; Nominations	No; Nominations	No; Nominations	Fifth Place (Day 112)	
Dani	Orit; Liron	Tom; Hadar	Tom; Hadar	No; Nominations	Nominated	No; Nominations	Exempt	Hadar; Einav	Coralie; Einav	Einav; Coralie	No; Nominations	Nominated	No; Nominations	No; Nominations	Hadar; Shilo	Nominated	No; Nominations	No; Nominations	No; Nominations	Hadar; Frida	No; Nominations	No; Nominations	No; Nominations	Evicted (Day 109)	
DJ	Not in House											Exempt	No; Nominations	No; Nominations	Shilo; Emily	Nominated	No; Nominations	No; Nominations	No; Nominations	Noam; Melanie	No; Nominations	No; Nominations	Evicted (Day 105)		
Melanie	Not in House				No; Nominations	No; Nominations	No; Nominations	Hadar; Einav	Einav; Noam	Hadar; Emily	No; Nominations	Nominated	Exempt	No; Nominations	Hadar; Shilo	No; Nominations	No; Nominations	No; Nominations	No; Nominations	DJ; Noam	No; Nominations	Evicted (Day 103)			
Michal	Not in House											Exempt	No; Nominations	No; Nominations	Hadar; Shilo	Nominated	No; Nominations	No; Nominations	No; Nominations	Hadar; Noam	Evicted (Day 102)				
Shilo	Not in House											Or; Emily	No; Nominations	Exempt	Idan; Michal	No; Nominations	No; Nominations	No; Nominations	No; Nominations	Evicted (Day 98)					
Emily	Dinor; Liron	Barak; Yahav	Orit; Noam	No; Nominations	Orit; Haim	No; Nominations	Exempt	Frida; Melanie	Coralie; Noam	Melanie; Mali	No; Nominations	Nominated	Exempt	No; Nominations	Noam; Michal	No; Nominations	No; Nominations	No; Nominations	Evicted (Day 91)						
Haim	Barak; Noam	Yossi; Einav	Yossi; Einav	No; Nominations	Nominated	No; Nominations	Exempt	Einav; Emily	Emily; Einav	Emily; Einav	No; Nominations	No; Nominations	Exempt	No; Nominations	Shilo; Emily	No; Nominations	No; Nominations	Evicted (Day 88)							
Einav	Not in House	Orit; Ben	Orit; Or	No; Nominations	Nominated	No; Nominations	No; Nominations	Or; Dani	Dani; Melanie	Ben; Dani	No; Nominations	Nominated	Exempt	No; Nominations	Noam; Michal	Nominated	Evicted (Day 84)								
Idan	Liron; Dani	Yahav; Dani	Yahav; Noam	No; Nominations	No; Nominations	Nominated	Evicted (Day 30)				Exempt	No; Nominations	No; Nominations	No; Nominations	Shilo; Michal	Evicted (Day 77)									
Itzik	Not in House											Einav; Coralie	No; Nominations	No; Nominations	Evicted (Day 70)										
Keren	Not in House											Einav; Coralie	No; Nominations	Evicted (Day 63)											
Coralie	Dinor; Idan	Orit; Or	Orit; Tom	No; Nominations	Nominated	No; Nominations	No; Nominations	Yossi; Or	Emily; Yossi	Hadar; Emily	No; Nominations	Nominated	Evicted (Day 58)												
Ben	Emily; Or	Yahav; Yossi	Dani; Einav	No; Nominations	No; Nominations	No; Nominations	No; Nominations	Hadar; Einav	Emily; Einav	Mali; Einav	No; Nominations	Evicted (Day 49)													
Mali	Not in House							Or; Yahav	Emily; Melanie	Hadar; Emily	Evicted (Day 49)														
Zahi	Not in House							Or; Einav	Einav; Melanie	Evicted (Day 42)															
Yahav	Not in House	Orit; Ben	Orit; Or	No; Nominations	Nominated	No; Nominations	Exempt	Or; Dani	Evicted (Day 36)																
Barak	Liron; Orit	Orit; Liron	Orit; Or	No; Nominations	No; Nominations	No; Nominations	No; Nominations	Evicted (Day 32)																	
Orit	Hadar; Dinor	Barak; Noam	Hadar; Emily	No; Nominations	Nominated	Evicted (Day 28)																			
Dana	Ben; Barak	Barak; Einav	Barak; Noam	No; Nominations	Evicted (Day 24)																				
Tom	Orit; Or	Yahav; Einav	Dani; Coralie	Evicted (Day 21)																					
Liron	Hadar; Emily	Barak; Yahav	Evicted (Day 16)																						
Dinor	Hadar; Emily	Evicted (Day 8)																							
Fake Housemates
Gaya	Left (Day 4)																								
Yehuda	Left (Day 4)																								
Note																									
Against public vote	Barak; Ben; Dinor; Emily; Hadar; Liron; Or; Orit	Barak; Ben; Dani; Einav; Hadar; Liron; Orit; Yahav; Yossi	Dani; Einav; Hadar; Noam; Or; Orit; Tom	All; Housemates	Coralie; Dani; Einav; Hadar; Haim; Or; Orit; Yahav	Idan; Yossi	Barak; Ben; Coralie; Einav; Frida; Melanie; Noam	Dani; Einav; Emily; Hadar; Melanie; Or; Yahav	Coralie; Dani; Einav; Emily; Melanie; Noam; Or; Zahi	Dani; Einav; Hadar; Noam; Or; Orit; Tom	All; Housemates except of Idan	Coralie; Dani; Einav; Emily; Frida; Melanie; Noam; Or	Dani; DJ; Idan; Itzik; Keren; Michal; Shilo	All; Housemates except of Shilo	Emily; Hadar; Haim; Idan; Michal; Noam; Or; Yossi	Dani; DJ; Einav; Hadar; Michal; Or; Yossi	All; Housemates	All; Housemates	All; Housemates except of Yossi	Dani; DJ; Frida; Hadar; Melanie; Michal; Noam; Or	All; Housemates except of Yossi	All; Housemates except of Yossi	All; Housemates except of Yossi		
Evicted	Dinor; Fewest votes to save	Liron; Fewest votes to save	Tom; Fewest votes to save	Dana; Fewest votes to save	Orit; Fewest votes to save	Idan; Fewest votes to save but came back	Barak; Fewest votes to save	Yahav; Fewest votes to save	Zahi; Fewest votes to save	Mali; Fewest votes to save	Ben; Fewest votes to save	Coralie; Fewest votes to save	Keren; Fewest votes to save	Itzik; Fewest votes to save	Idan; Fewest votes to save	Einav; Fewest votes to save	Haim; Fewest votes to save	Emily; Fewest votes to save	Shilo; Fewest votes to save	Michal; Fewest votes to save	Melanie; Fewest votes to save	DJ; Fewest votes to save	Dani; Fewest votes to save	Noam; Fewest votes (out of 5)	Hadar; Fewest votes (out of 4)
Evicted	Dinor; Fewest votes to save	Liron; Fewest votes to save	Tom; Fewest votes to save	Dana; Fewest votes to save	Orit; Fewest votes to save	Idan; Fewest votes to save but came back	Barak; Fewest votes to save	Yahav; Fewest votes to save	Zahi; Fewest votes to save	Mali; Fewest votes to save	Ben; Fewest votes to save	Coralie; Fewest votes to save	Keren; Fewest votes to save	Itzik; Fewest votes to save	Idan; Fewest votes to save	Einav; Fewest votes to save	Haim; Fewest votes to save	Emily; Fewest votes to save	Shilo; Fewest votes to save	Michal; Fewest votes to save	Melanie; Fewest votes to save	DJ; Fewest votes to save	Dani; Fewest votes to save	Yossi; Fewest votes (out of 3)	Frida; Fewest votes (out of 2)
Evicted	Dinor; Fewest votes to save	Liron; Fewest votes to save	Tom; Fewest votes to save	Dana; Fewest votes to save	Orit; Fewest votes to save	Idan; Fewest votes to save but came back	Barak; Fewest votes to save	Yahav; Fewest votes to save	Zahi; Fewest votes to save	Mali; Fewest votes to save	Ben; Fewest votes to save	Coralie; Fewest votes to save	Keren; Fewest votes to save	Itzik; Fewest votes to save	Idan; Fewest votes to save	Einav; Fewest votes to save	Haim; Fewest votes to save	Emily; Fewest votes to save	Shilo; Fewest votes to save	Michal; Fewest votes to save	Melanie; Fewest votes to save	DJ; Fewest votes to save	Dani; Fewest votes to save	Or; Most votes to win	

== Nominations totals received ==
	Week 1	Week 2	Week 3	Week 4		Week 5		Week 6		Week 7		Week 8	Week 9	Week 10	Week 11	Week 12	Week 13		Week 14	Week 15			Week 16	Final	Total
Or	3	1	5	—	1	—	—	7	1	1	—	1	—	—	—	—	—	—	—	2	—	—	—	Winner	22
Frida	0	0	0	—	0	—	—	1	0	1	—	—	—	—	0	—	—	—	—	1	—	—	—	Runner-up	3
Yossi	—	2	1	—	0	—	—	1	1	0	—	—	—	—	0	—	—	—	—					Third Place	5
Hadar	4	2	4	—	1	—	—	5	—	4	—	—	—	—	4	—	—	—	—	3	—	—	—	Fourth Place	27
Noam	1	1	3	—	0	—	—	0	3	2	—	—	—	—	2	—	—	—	—	4	—	—	—	Fifth Place	14
Dani	1	2	2	—	1	—	—	3	2	1	—	—	—	—	1	—	—	—	—	3	—	—	—	Evicted	16
DJ	Not in house											—	—	—	0	—	—	—	—	2	—	—	Evicted		2
Melanie	Not in house				0	—	—	2	3	2	—	—	—	—	1	—	—	—	—	1	—	Evicted			9
Michal	Not in house											—	—	—	4	—	—	—	—	2	Evicted				6
Shilo	Not in house											—	—	—	10	—	—	—	—	Evicted					10
Emily	3	0	1	—	0	—	—	2	5	5	—	1	—	—	2	—	—	—	Evicted						19
Haim	0	0	1	—	1	—	—	0	1	1	—	—	—	—	1	—	—	Evicted							4
Einav	—	4	3	—	1	—	—	5	6	3	—	1	—	—	1	—	Evicted								24
Idan	1	0	0	—	0	—	Evicted				—	—	—	—	1	Evicted									2
Itzik	Not in house											—	—	—	Evicted										0
Keren	Not in house											—	—	Evicted											0
Coralie	0	0	1	—	1	—	—	1	5	4	—	1	Evicted												13
Ben	2	3	0	—	0	—	—	0	0	1	—	Evicted													6
Mali	Not in house							—	—	3	Evicted														3
Zahi	Not in house							—	—	Evicted															0
Yahav	—	6	1	—	1	—	—	2	Evicted																10
Barak	2	4	1	—	0	—	—	Evicted																	7
Orit	4	7	7	—	1	Evicted																			19
Dana	0	0	0	—	Evicted																				0
Tom	0	1	4	Evicted																					5
Liron	6	2	Evicted																						8
Dinor	5	Evicted																							5
Fake Housemates
Gaya	Left																								N/A
Yehuda	Left																								N/A
