= Ronen Feigenbaum =

Israeli footballer (born 1975)

Ronen Feigenbaum רונן פייגנבוים
Personal information
- Full name: Ronen Feigenbaum
- Date of birth: 2 April 1975 (age 51)
- Place of birth: Israel
- Position: Defender

Senior career*
Years	Team	Apps	(Gls)
1996–1998	Hapoel Tel Aviv		
1998–2000	Bnei Yehuda	37	(0)
2000	Maccabi Herzliya		
2000–2001	Hapoel Tzafririm Holon		
2001–2003	Hapoel Jerusalem		
2003–2004	Maccabi Ironi Kiryat Ata		
2004–2005	Hapoel Nazareth Illit		
2005	Maccabi Ahi Nazareth		
2005–2006	Hapoel Bnei Lod		
2006–2007	Maccabi Ironi Kiryat Ata	0	(0)
2010–2011	Beitar Ariel	18	(4)

International career
1996–1997	Israel U-21	5	(1)
- * Club domestic league appearances and goals

Ronen Feigenbaum (Hebrew: רונן פייגנבוים; born 2 April 1975) is a former Israeli footballer. He is the son of Yehoshua Feigenbaum.
